= Beth Willis (producer) =

British television producer

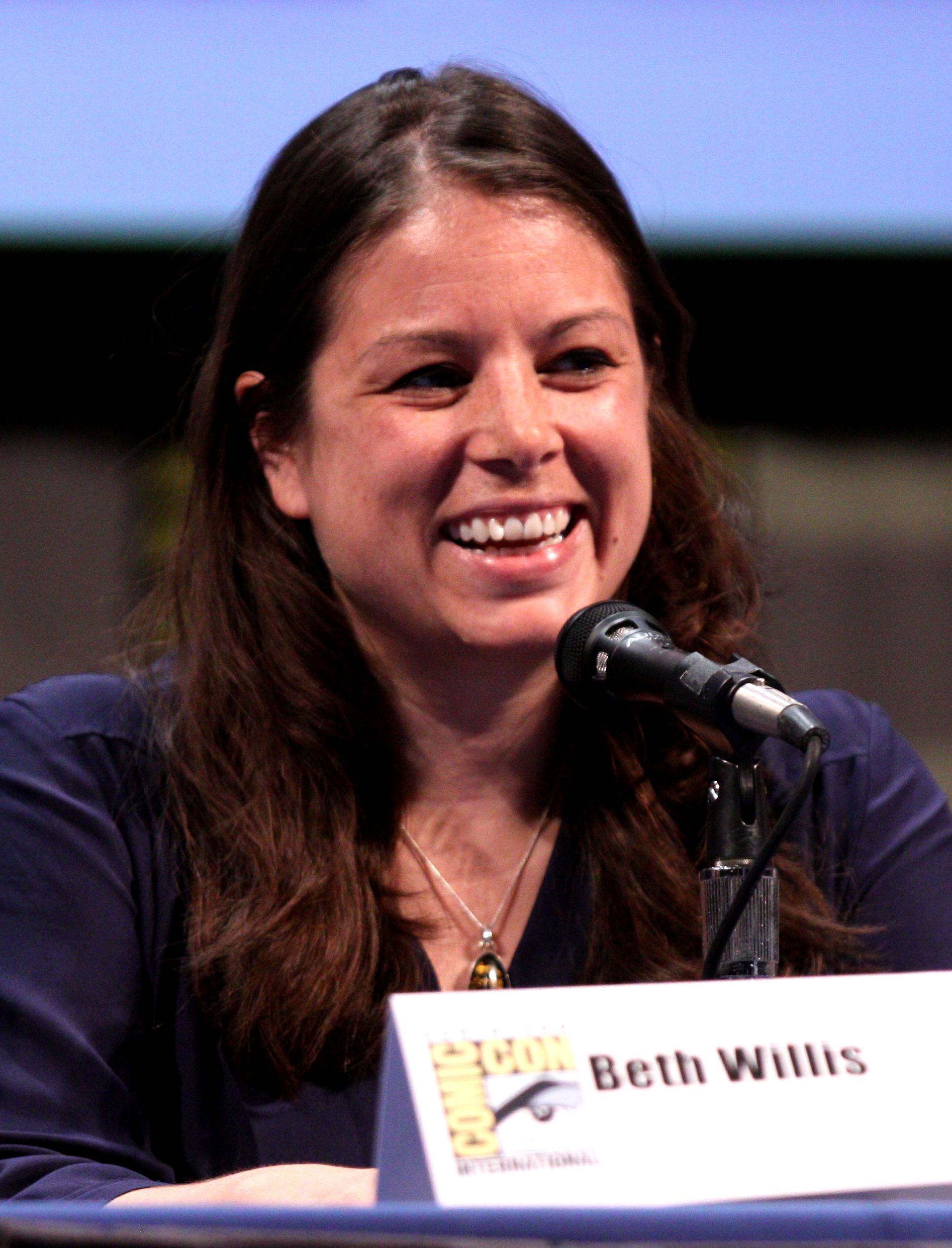
Willis at San Diego Comic-Con in July 2011.

Beth Willis (born 1978) is a British television executive who is currently joint Managing Director of television production company The Forge, a subsidiary of Banijay UK.

== Career ==
In her early career, Willis worked as a script editor on Agatha Christie's Poirot and The Amazing Mrs Pritchard.

Willis was the producer of the BBC drama series Ashes to Ashes, and she was an executive producer (alongside Steven Moffat and Piers Wenger) of the fifth (2010) and sixth series (2011) of Doctor Who.

From 2012 to 2018, Willis worked at Channel 4, initially as Deputy Head of Drama, before becoming Head of Drama in 2016. While at Channel 4, Willis commissioned the BAFTA-winning The End of the F***ing World, BAFTA-winning National Treasure and RTS-winning No Offence and Humans.

In 2018, Willis joined production company The Forge to work alongside founder George Faber and she became joint Managing Director (with George Ormond) in 2026. The Forge productions overseen by Willis include The Buccaneers for Apple TV and A Woman of Substance for Channel 4.

== Personal life ==
Willis is the granddaughter of late writer and prominent Labour peer, Ted Willis, Baron Willis, and she was educated at Blackheath High School.
