= The Village (2013 TV series) =

- Genre: Drama
- Created by: Peter Moffat
- Written by: Peter Moffat
- Directed by: Antonia Bird; Gillies MacKinnon; Luke Watson; Jamie Stone; Dominic Leclerc
- Starring: John Simm; Maxine Peake; Juliet Stevenson; Rupert Evans; Nico Mirallegro; Bill Jones; Tom Varey
- Composer: Adrian Corker
- Country of origin: United Kingdom
- Original language: English
- No. of series: 2
- No. of episodes: 12

Production
- Executive producers: John Griffin; George Faber; Charles Pattinson; Peter Moffat
- Producer: Emma Burge
- Production location: Derbyshire
- Cinematography: David Odd
- Editors: St. John O'Rorke; Anne Sopel
- Running time: 60 minutes
- Production company: Company Pictures

Original release
- Network: BBC One
- Release: 31 March 2013 – 14 September 2014

The Village is a BBC television series written by Peter Moffat. The drama is set in a Derbyshire village in the early 20th century, covering events from the summer of 1914 until 1924. The first series of what Moffat hoped would become a 42-hour televised drama following an extended family through the 20th century, was broadcast in spring 2013 and covered the years 1914 to 1920. A second series was broadcast in autumn 2014, and continued the story into the 1920s. The programme did not return after the second series.

== Plot ==
The Village tells the story of life in a Derbyshire village through the eyes of a central character, Bert Middleton. Bert has been portrayed as a boy by Bill Jones, as a teen by Alfie Stewart, as a young man by Tom Varey, and as an old man by David Ryall. John Simm plays Bert's father John Middleton, an abusive, alcoholic Peak District farmer, and Maxine Peake plays Bert's mother, Grace.

Writer Peter Moffat has spoken of wanting to create 'a British Heimat', alluding to Edgar Reitz's epic German saga Heimat, which followed one extended family in a region of the Rhineland from 1919 to 2000. Unlike Downton Abbey, this version of history is a working-class history—"domestics are expected to face the walls when the master walks by".

== Production ==
The first series was filmed in and around Hayfield, Edale, Glossop, Chapel-en-le-Frith and Charlesworth in the Peak District, and in the grounds of Tatton Park in Cheshire, during October to December 2012. The four first episodes were directed by Antonia Bird, her last work before her death the same year.

John Simm used local historian Margaret Wombwell's book Milk, Muck and Memories in his research for how the farmers from the period lived, and Moffat researched locally and at the Imperial War Museum.

On 28 April 2013 the BBC Media Centre reported that "BBC One's critically acclaimed epic Sunday night drama series starring Maxine Peake and John Simm will return with six more episodes next year." The second and final series began filming at the end of March 2014 in Derbyshire. The stately home and grounds at Lyme Park were used as a new filming location. It was confirmed by cast members on Twitter that filming for the second series had wrapped on 4 July 2014.

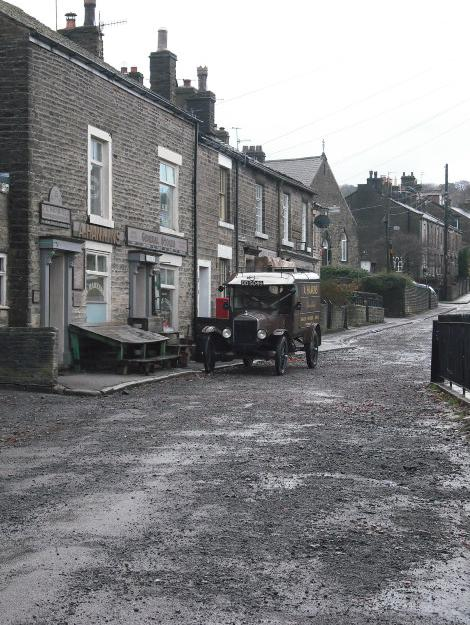
A street from the series during filming

== Main cast ==
- John Simm as John Middleton
- Maxine Peake as Grace Middleton
- Bill Jones as Bert Middleton (aged 12)
- Alfie Stewart as Bert (aged 18)
- Tom Varey as Bert (aged 21)
- David Ryall as Old Bert
- Nico Mirallegro as Joe Middleton
- Charlie Murphy as Martha Lane
- Juliet Stevenson as Clem Allingham
- Augustus Prew as George Allingham
- Emily Beecham as Caro Allingham
- Rupert Evans as Edmund Allingham
- Kit Jackson as Lord Allingham
- Matt Stokoe as Gerard Eyre
- Stephen Walters as Crispin Ingham
- Ainsley Howard as Norma Greaves
- Annabelle Apsion as Margaret Boden
- Anthony Flanagan as Arnold Hankin
- Chloe Harris as Agnes
- Scott Handy as Robin Lane
- Joe Duttine as Rutter
- Amelia Young as Polly
- Jim Cartwright as Peter the Landlord
- Joe Armstrong as Stephen Bairstow
- Julian Sands as Lord Kilmartin
- Derek Riddell as Bill Gibby
- Juliet Aubrey as Joy Dangerfield
- Andrew Gower as Gilbert Hankin
- Phoebe Dynevor as Phoebe Rundle
- Matthew James Lowe as Phoebe's brother aged 8
- William George Lowe as Phoebe's brother aged 7
- Lucy Brown as Harriet Kilmartin
- Ben Batt as Alf Rutter
- Daniel Ezra as Ghana Jones
- Chloe Rowley as Mary Middleton
- Luke Williams as Paul Boden
- Alex Robertson as Robert Read

== Episodes ==
=== Series 1 (2013) ===
No.	Title	Directed by	Written by	Original release date	UK viewers (millions)
1	"Episode 1"	Antonia Bird	Peter Moffat	31 March 2013	8.17
Summer 1914. Twelve-year-old Bert Middleton is torn between his bullying father John, who wants him to help out on the family farm, and his teacher Gerard Eyre, who wants him to stay in school. His older brother Joe earns extra money as a gardener at the Allingham estate. The first bus arrives in the village bringing the minister's daughter, Martha Lane, whose progressive views conflict with the traditional ways of the villagers. When World War I begins, Joe joins up with the encouragement of his mother Grace, who wants him to escape the confines of the village. Joe sleeps with the Allinghams' troubled daughter Caro before he ships out.
2	"Episode 2"	Antonia Bird	Peter Moffat	7 April 2013	6.85
January 1915. When his crop fails, John Middleton gets drunk and wanders onto the Allingham estate, where he is seen chasing a disturbed Caro Allingham in her night dress. Caro is discovered to be five months pregnant, and although she confides in her brother George that Joe Middleton is the father, her older brother Edmund calls in Detective Bairstow to investigate. John Middleton is under suspicion because in the past he impregnated his wife's sister, who committed suicide. An angry mob descends on the Middleton farm, led by another farmer, Rutter, who wants the land for himself. John tries to hang himself but is rescued by Bert and Grace. Detective Bairstow asks Caro if John forced himself on her and she tells him no. Bert gives his father money he has been saving and John buys a cow.
3	"Episode 3"	Antonia Bird	Peter Moffat	14 April 2013	6.37
March 1916. Grace Middleton and other local women go to work at a new boot factory opened by Arnold Hankin. Joe Middleton comes home on leave, bringing news of the death of his friend, Paul Boden. Joe learns that Caro had his baby, but the Allinghams have given the child up for adoption without her consent. Gerard Eyre is brought before a tribunal as a conscientious objector. Bert tries to help his teacher, but Eyre is taken away, leaving Bert his camera.
4	"Episode 4"	Antonia Bird	Peter Moffat	21 April 2013	6.19
July 1916. Martha Lane tries to organise the women workers at the boot factory, with Grace's help. Caro Allingham's mental health declines, and a sadistic doctor subjects her to a regime that includes force feeding. When her brother George tries to intervene, Dr Wylie suggests he be sent off to war. The Middletons' baby daughter Mary becomes seriously ill with scarlet fever. John steals a small amount of animal medicine from the Allingham estate farm, but that same night one of the Allinghams' cows is mutilated. John is arrested, but the truth is revealed when Lord Allingham – who was disfigured in the Zulu War – kills the rest of the cows and then kills himself.
5	"Episode 5"	Gillies MacKinnon	Peter Moffat	28 April 2013	5.88
Winter 1916. Grace meets with a union representative about working conditions at the factory, not realising that his aim is to send the women back to their homes when the men return from war. Joe Middleton comes home on leave after the Battle of the Somme and tries to conceal his shell shock from his family, but Grace knows something is wrong. Joe sets out to return to the front but is overcome by fear and is found crawling through a field by Bairstow. Bairstow had been wounded in the war and agrees not to turn Joe in but warns the family that he is now a deserter. Joe confides in his parents that he was punished for sending a coded postcard to Bert by being tied up and left exposed to enemy fire overnight. Blaming himself, Bert runs away but falls and injures his leg. Joe finds Bert and brings him home, but the military police are waiting at the farm. Joe is executed for desertion.
6	"Episode 6"	Gillies MacKinnon	Peter Moffat	5 May 2013	5.48
1920. Eyre is released from prison but is unwelcome in the village. Bert invites Eyre to stay at the farm despite his father's disapproval. Eyre and many others fall ill with Spanish flu and the village is quarantined. Grace learns that Joe's name will not be on the new war memorial and speaks out at a meeting held by Edmund Allingham, the local MP. On the day of the unveiling, Edmund's mother Lady Allingham comes to see Grace and reveals the truth about Caro's baby. The Middletons discover that Joe's name has been included on the memorial after all.

=== Series 2 (2014) ===
No.	Title	Directed by	Written by	Original release date	UK viewers (millions)
1	"Episode 1"	Luke Watson	Peter Moffat	10 August 2014	5.26
1923. The Allinghams host a house party for Lord Kilmartin, a political sponsor who could appoint Edmund as Home Secretary. One of the entertainments is a manhunt, with Bert Middleton as the quarry. Bert hopes to win £5 so he can leave the village for a job in Sheffield, but his father also needs the money to rent a barn for their cattle. Bert wins, but Lord Kilmartin claims he cheated and refuses to pay. The Allinghams host a boxing tournament featuring a black boxer who is barred from boxing professionally despite his service in the Great War. Edmund uses the match as a political platform, but he is surprised when Labour candidate Bill Gibby also makes a speech, quoting from Shelley's poem The Masque of Anarchy. Grace Middleton interrupts the Allinghams' dinner party to demand her son's winnings, and Edmund relents, losing Kilmartin's support. Edmund's advisor Bairstow blackmails Kilmartin into promising Edmund the cabinet position. Bert decides to give the money to his father.
2	"Episode 2"	Luke Watson	Peter Moffat	17 August 2014	4.39
While John Middleton struggles to keep his dairy business going without a barn, Grace is drawn to Labour candidate Bill Gibby and goes on a bicycle ride through the Peak District with him. Joy Dangerfield comes to the village to teach the family planning methods of Marie Stopes. Martha Allingham is unhappy in her marriage to her shell-shocked husband George and takes a job at the school with Gerard Eyre. Clem Allingham is encouraged by Bairstow to find a wife for her son Edmund, who is in love with another man, Robert. Arnold Hankin decides to open a dance hall, leaving his son Gilbert in charge of the factory, where an accident causes a pregnant Agnes to lose her job. Gilbert invites Agnes to the dance hall opening, and Phoebe invites Bert Middleton but is dismayed to discover his feelings for Martha.
3	"Episode 3"	Jamie Stone	Amy Roberts and Loren McLaughlan	24 August 2014	4.13
John Middleton makes a deal to sell milk at the Hankins' shop after Rutter's herd is stricken with tuberculosis. Grace tries to help Agnes get her job at the factory back, but Agnes goes to work as the Hankins' maid until her pregnancy is discovered by Norma. On polling day, Bill Gibby wins Edmund's seat, and after a delay, a Labour government is formed.
4	"Episode 4"	Jamie Stone	Amy Roberts and Loren McLaughlan	31 August 2014	4.3
1924 Agnes marries Gilbert Hankin. The Conservatives return to power and Edmund regains his seat. Edmund prepares to marry Harriet Kilmartin, and Lady Allingham is incensed as she realises that he won't give up Robert. Bert receives a postcard from the boxer Ghana Jones and decides to go with him to America, leaving Phoebe and his family behind. The villagers become angry when they are denied their traditional routes across Allingham land. Minister Robin Lane organises a peaceful protest, but Bill Gibby gets involved and calls for a mass trespass that turns violent. John Middleton sees his wife in Gibby's arms just before a blow to the head knocks him unconscious.
5	"Episode 5"	Dominic Leclerc	Peter Moffat	7 September 2014	4.66
As John lies in a coma, gossip spreads through the village about the nature of Grace's relationship with Bill Gibby. Bairstow initiates a police investigation into the mass trespass, and Bert and Eyre are arrested for rioting. Pressured by his family, George Allingham testifies against them but has second thoughts and arranges to be found in bed with a maid in order to discredit himself as a witness and free his wife Martha to divorce him and marry Eyre.
6	"Episode 6"	Dominic Leclerc	Peter Moffat	14 September 2014	4.27
John wakes from his coma but is having difficulty speaking. Grace worries that he remembers seeing her with Bill Gibby, and Bert becomes angry at his mother. Gibby plots to flood the village with a reservoir to provide drinking water for Sheffield, despite Edmund's objections. Martha and Eyre leave the village together and go to Africa. Caro decides she wants to find her and Joe Middleton's son, who was given up for adoption without her consent. Her family thwart her efforts and tell her the boy died, and she tries to drown herself but is rescued by George and Bairstow. Bairstow learns where the boy is and informs George, who brings Caro's son back to her, an angry Edmund tries to fire him but is thwarted when Bairstow threatens to reveal his true sexuality to the Daily Mail. Grace finds out about the reservoir and vows to stop it. She reconciles with John, while Bert decides to ask Phoebe to marry him.

== Reception ==
First series
The Village received mainly positive reviews after the first episode; the Independent said "the story was ostensibly small and specific", but "then it opened up, cinematically, to the world beyond with panoramic shots of the English countryside – vast acres of fields, hills and sky. These suddenly striking images gave it an epic quality". The Telegraph remarked on the authenticity of scenes, commending how "The Village refused to foist contemporary relevance on its audience" and describing it as "the most accomplished new drama of the year so far".

The first series of The Village received three BAFTA nominations in the categories of Best Drama Series, Leading Actress for Maxine Peake and Supporting Actor for Nico Mirallegro.

Second series
Before the second series aired, the Daily Telegraph reported that the new series would be more light-hearted. The Guardian was more positive, saying that although the new series was still "bleak as bleak...Peter Moffat's bold idea of creating an epic 42-part saga documenting 20th-century rural England through one Peak District community begins to make sense and take on a new importance." The Telegraph review was less positive than for the first series, saying it "has its moments but the end result is muddled" and giving it a two out of five rating.

== DVD ==
A Region 2 DVD of series one was released by Entertainment One on 8 July 2013. A Region 2 DVD of series two was released 9 March 2015.

== Notes ==
- A new recording of "I Vow to Thee, My Country" by Beck Goldsmith is used for the trailer soundtrack.
