= Roadkill (TV series) =

UK television series

- Genre: Political intrigue drama; Thriller
- Created by: David Hare
- Written by: David Hare
- Directed by: Michael Keillor
- Starring: Hugh Laurie; Helen McCrory; Sidse Babett Knudsen; Pippa Bennett-Warner; Iain De Caestecker; Shalom Brune-Franklin; Sarah Greene; Saskia Reeves; Millie Brady; Olivia Vinall; Patricia Hodge
- Music by: Harry Escott
- Country of origin: United Kingdom
- Original language: English
- No. of series: 1
- No. of episodes: 4

Production
- Executive producers: Mark Pybus (The Forge); George S. J. Faber (The Forge); David Hare; Michael Keillor; Lucy Richer (BBC); Rebecca Eaton (Masterpiece)
- Producer: Andy Litvin
- Cinematography: Wojciech Szepel
- Editor: Dominic Strevens
- Running time: 55–57 minutes
- Production company: The Forge

Original release
- Network: BBC One
- Release: 18 October – 8 November 2020

Roadkill is a British four-part television political intrigue thriller written and created by David Hare, and directed by Michael Keillor. The series was made by The Forge production studio for the BBC, co-financed by Masterpiece in association with All3Media International. It was first broadcast in the UK on BBC One on 18 October 2020. In the United States, it was broadcast as part of the Masterpiece anthology series on PBS starting on 1 November 2020.

== Premise ==
The series stars Hugh Laurie as the populist Conservative politician, Peter Laurence, freshly promoted to the middle-ranking Justice Secretary and on the up, after just dodging a scandal by winning a major libel case in the High Court against a national newspaper, but whose private life is under fire from his family — including an imprisoned illegitimate daughter, who has just come to light — as well as his political foes. Primary amongst his political friends and enemies is the embattled Prime Minister Dawn Ellison played by Helen McCrory in her final performance before her death in April 2021.

== Cast ==
- Hugh Laurie as the Rt Hon. Peter Laurence MP, the Secretary of State for Justice and Lord Chancellor
- Helen McCrory as the Rt Hon. Dawn Ellison MP, Prime Minister of the United Kingdom
- Pippa Bennett-Warner as Rochelle Madeley
- Millie Brady as Lily Laurence
- Ophelia Lovibond as Susan Laurence
- Shalom Brune-Franklin as Rose Dietl
- Iain De Caestecker as Duncan Knock
- Sarah Greene as Charmian Pepper
- Saskia Reeves as Helen Laurence
- Patricia Hodge as Lady Roche
- Olivia Vinall as Julia Blythe
- Sidse Babett Knudsen as Madeleine Halle
- Danny Ashok as Luke Strand
- Gbemisola Ikumelo as Steff Frost
- Emma Cunniffe as Sydney
- Caroline Lee-Johnson as Bella Gayle
- Natalie Dew as Alisha Burman
- Anna Francolini as HJ Keane
- Vincenzo Nicoli as George
- Jennifer Hennessy as Bryony Beckett
- Yolanda Kettle as Joy Pelling
- Kate Lamb as Lindsay Storm
- Katie Leung as Margaret Moore
- Pip Torrens as Joe Lapidus
- Alice McMillan as Charlotte Hedge
- Tony Pitts as Mick 'the Mouth' Murray
- Nicholas Rowe as Adam De Banzie
- Sylvestra Le Touzel as Dame Vanessa Pollard

== Episodes ==
No. overall	No. in series	Title	Directed by	Written by	Original release date	Viewers (millions)
1	1	"Episode 1"	Michael Keillor	David Hare	18 October 2020	8.68
Peter Laurence is a charismatic government minister on the verge of promotion to high office. He is also celebrating a win in a newspaper libel case. But an inmate at a women’s prison claims to have a secret about Peter’s past that could affect his future..
2	2	"Episode 2"	Michael Keillor	David Hare	25 October 2020	6.47
As Charmian digs into Peter's political past in Washington DC, troubles arise at home as Peter's family discovers his affair.
3	3	"Episode 3"	Michael Keillor	David Hare	1 November 2020	6.38
Confronted with his affair, Peter is the defendant at the family dinner table. Pressure mounts on Peter, as friends, family, employees, and even a dead person turn against him. Meanwhile, Rochelle questions whether to pick up where Charmian left off.
4	4	"Episode 4"	Michael Keillor	David Hare	8 November 2020	6.29
With the Prime Minister in trouble, Peter makes a shocking announcement to the nation. But with his enemies circling, he is forced to risk one final roll of the dice.

== Production ==
The series was filmed on location in London and Hastings.

== Release ==
Roadkill was released on DVD and blu-ray in the UK by Dazzler Media in 2021.

== Accolades ==
Year	Ceremony	Category	Recipient(s)	Result
2021	BAFTA TV Craft Awards	Original Music	Harry Escott	Won
