= Gateway to the West =

Gateway to the West is a nickname that may refer to:

== Australia ==
- Fremantle

== Canada ==
- Winnipeg, Manitoba
- Port Arthur, Ontario
- Thunder Bay, Ontario
- Sudbury, Ontario

== China ==
- Chongqing Municipality

== United States ==
- Fort Smith, Arkansas
- Lyons, Illinois
- Fort Wayne, Indiana
- Council Bluffs, Iowa
- Leavenworth, Kansas
  - Fort Leavenworth
- Missouri
  - Independence, Missouri
  - Kansas City, Missouri
    - Westport, Kansas City, Missouri
  - St. Joseph, Missouri
  - St. Louis, Missouri
    - Gateway Arch in St. Louis
    - A themed area in Six Flags St. Louis, Eureka, Missouri
- Omaha, Nebraska
- Fargo, North Dakota
- Bridgeport, Ohio
- Pittsburgh, Pennsylvania, (see History of Pittsburgh)
- Kemmerer, Wyoming
- The mountain formation known as Cumberland Gap

== See also ==
- Gateway to the Southwest
- 1242: Gateway to the West
