= Genevieve Chenneour =

English actress

- Born: Genevieve Martha Manon Randall; 19 December 1997 (age 28); Northallerton, England
- Education: Oxford Brookes University

Genevieve Manon Florence Chenneour (née Genevieve Martha Manon Randall; born 19 December 1997) is an English actress and former elite artistic swimmer. She is known for her roles as Miss Clara Livingston in the Netflix period drama Bridgerton (2024) and Uulan in the epic historical film 1242: Gateway To The West (2025).

Until 2016, Chenneour was a professional athlete who represented Team GB at the Baku 2015 European Games, World Aquatics and 2014 LEN European Championships in the solo, duet, and team Artistic swimming events.

== Early life and education ==
Chenneour was born in Northallerton and brought up in Faringdon, Oxfordshire. Chenneour holds dual British and Irish citizenship. Chenneour attended King Alfred's Academy. Growing up with a strong interest in movement, performance, and sport, she trained in ballet and dance, classical singing, gymnastics, and swimming from a young age. Chenneour went on to study sports science at Oxford Brookes University.

== Career ==
=== Artistic swimming ===
Chenneour competed internationally with Great Britain at the 2013 World Aquatics Championships. She held the Team GB UK Sport Athlete Podium Potential Award from 2013 to 2014. Chenneour made her major international debut at the 2014 European Aquatics Championships in Berlin securing two top-ten finishes. In 2015, she competed in the solo and duet events at the European Games in Baku securing a top 12th position in the final of the duet and 13th in the qualifying round of the solo. Chenneour competed in the duet event at the 2015 World Aquatics Championships in Kazan, Russia. Also in 2015, she was named Swim England ASA Aquatic Awards Performance Athlete of the Year alongside her duet partner, Jodie Cowie and was awarded an International Olympic Committee Solidarity Athlete scholarship in preparation for the 2016 Olympic Games. Chenneour was set to challenge for a duet team place to compete in 2016 Rio Olympic Games but was forced to withdraw due to injury. Chenneour is a member of the British Elite Athlete Association (formerly the BAC), the representative body for Britain's past and present elite athletes. Upon retirement from professional sporting competition in 2016, and graduation, Chenneour embarked on professional training, marking the beginning of her transition into the acting profession and formal representation. In her own words, Chenneour was drawn to a new form of expression; she considered her sport 'as more than athleticism - it was physical theatre, a way to express something deeper through water, rhythm and connection'.

=== Acting ===
Chenneour's television credits include appearances in the BBC mini-series Trigonometry (2020) and the HBO series Avenue 5 (2020). She has been featured in several notable global advertising campaigns including Oral-B (2024), Temple Spar (2023), Royal Enfield (2022), eBay & Love Island (2022), and British Airways (2019). Chenneour's versatility extends to music videos; She appeared in the Calum Scott's Biblical (2021) and Fredo featuring Dave's Money Talks (2021). In 2019, Chenneour participated in a prominent campaign in honour of The Great British Beach Clean organised by The Marine Conservation Society. Chenneour's breakthrough film work began in 2022 when she successfully auditioned for the prominent female role of Uulan, Batu Khan's Hungarian lover in the Feature film 1242: Gateway to the West. Hungarian press reviews highlight the role's physicality and Chenneour's involvement in the film's action sequences, describing her character as a strong female presence. Later in 2022 Chenneour played the recurring role of Miss Clara Livingston, the 'gossipy' debutante participating in the London social season ('the ton'), in the third series of the Shondaland-produced Netflix romance period drama Bridgerton. In 2024, she played the lead role of Sage Evans in the short film, Diary of a Ghost which deals with the subject of prolonged grief disorder. In 2025 Chenneour played the role of Jaz Williams in the short film, The Impending White Light which poses an answer to one of life’s most important questions: What really happens when we die? In 2026 she played the lead role of Abby Gilbert in the British psychosexual erotic feature ‘Asphyxia’. Chenneour has appeared in editorial features in Square Mile (magazine) and in the lifestyle section of The Times. In the 31 December 2025 / 7 January 2026 Issue of Country Life, Chenneour was featured as the magazine's frontispiece subject, part of its long-running "Girls in Pearls" portrait series.

=== Writing and other work ===
Outside her acting career Chenneour writes personal essays and reflections on her Substack newsletter, The Naked Pages where she discusses her experiences in the entertainment industry and aspects of her life journey.

== Personal life ==
In February 2025 Chenneour was involved in a widely reported attempted violent robbery while seated in a cafe in London. An attempt was made to steal her phone and she fought back, pursuing the thief and recovering her phone after a prolonged struggle. CCTV footage circulated widely in the media showed her using self-defence techniques; she credited her quick reflexes in responding to the threat, to her athletic background and theatrical fight training. The incident sparked broader discussions in the media around public safety and street crime in London particularly in the context of female safety. In August 2025, Chenneour told the BBC that the incident had left her with agoraphobia, and that as a result she was unable to leave her house in its immediate aftermath.

== Filmography ==
=== Film ===
Year	Title	Role	Notes
2020	Reflection in Water	Isla	Short
2020	Apparently I'm Complicated	Lead role	Short
2020	BecoME One Minute	Lead role	Short
2021	Munich – The Edge of War		
2021	Phantom of the Open	Pretty Girl	
2023	Mum Said	Stunt performer	
2024	Diary of a Ghost	Sage Evans	Short
2025	1242: Gateway to the West	Uulan	
2025	The Higher Path	Jen	Short
2025	The Impending White Light	Jaz Williams	Short
2026	Asphyxia	Abby Gilbert	

=== Television ===
Year	Title	Role	Notes
2020	Trigonometry	Team Mate	1 episode
2020	Avenue 5	Judd's PA	1 episode
2021	Britannia	Acolyte	1 episode
2024	The Gentlemen	Stunt performer	1 episode
2024	Bridgerton	Miss Clara Livingston	Recurring season 3, 5 episodes

=== Music videos ===
Song	Year	Artist	Notes	Ref.
''Biblical''	2021	Callum Scott		
''Money Talks''	2020	Fredo featuring Dave		
''Feeling Better''	2016	The Magic Gang		

=== Readings and Benefits ===
- 'Kureishi: Stories & Violin' (short story) for WORDTheatreUK: In Person series (18 June 2023)

== Awards and nominations ==
Year	Award	Category	Work	Result	Ref.
2025	Actor Awards	Outstanding Performance by an Ensemble in a Drama Series	Bridgerton	Nominated	
