= Talk to Me (British TV series) =

- Genre: Drama
- Created by: Danny Brocklehurst
- Directed by: Dearbhla Walsh
- Starring: Max Beesley; Laura Fraser; Joseph Millson; Emma Pierson; Kate Ashfield; Adrian Bower; Aaron Johnson
- Composer: Tim Phillips
- Country of origin: United Kingdom
- Original language: English
- No. of series: 1
- No. of episodes: 4

Production
- Executive producers: George Faber; Charles Pattinson
- Producer: Matt Jones
- Running time: approx. 47 min. per episode

Original release
- Network: ITV
- Release: 10 June – 1 July 2007

Talk to Me is a four-part British television series, written by writer Danny Brocklehurst, produced by Company Pictures for ITV. The first episode attracted 4.2 million viewers, growing to 5.5 million in its second week. The series was released on DVD by Granada Ventures on 9 July 2007.

An American remake for FOX Network was developed but did not make it to air.

== Synopsis ==
The series began on 10 June 2007 and stars Max Beesley as Mitch Moore, a womanising radio host whose producer is also his best mate and about to marry Claire (played by Laura Fraser). She is a new mother, experiencing the emotional crunch of returning to her office job after maternity leave. Mitch was in love with Clare and after Clare had an argument with her fiancé, she and Mitch slept together. Clare walked out on him telling him it was a one-off but later they had sex in his car. Clare eventually breaks her affair with Mitch off, but feeling guilty she tells her fiancé what she has done. He walks out on her and takes their baby son. He then punches Mitch and tells him they are no longer friends. Clare and her fiancé eventually reconcile when Mitch makes a heartfelt plea on his radio station, Mitch is left with no one.

== Production ==
It was announced in early 2007 under the working title Is This Love?. ITV commissioned the show in a bid to rebrand their channel for a younger audience, Laura Mackie's first show since becoming controller of drama, she stated that Talk to Me is the template for their new output - sexy, stylish and contemporary.

== Characters ==
- Mitch Moore (Max Beesley) — Radio DJ at Life FM who gives love advice to callers.
- Claire (Laura Fraser) — HR Director and Woody's wife.
- Woody (Joseph Millson) — Mitch's best friend and producer, and Claire's husband.
- Ally (Emma Pierson) — Tourist information assistant and one of Mitch's recent conquests.
- Kelly (Kate Ashfield) — Mitch's sister, a schoolteacher.
- Scott (Adrian Bower) — Kelly's husband.
- Aaron (Aaron Johnson) — Kelly's student/lover
