= The Last Post (TV series) =

- Genre: Drama
- Created by: Peter Moffat
- Directed by: Jonny Campbell; Miranda Bowen
- Starring: Jessie Buckley; Stephen Campbell Moore; Amanda Drew; Ben Miles; Jeremy Neumark Jones; Jessica Raine
- Composer: Solomon Grey
- Country of origin: United Kingdom
- Original language: English
- No. of series: 1
- No. of episodes: 6

Production
- Executive producers: George Faber; Peter Moffat; Matthew Read; Lucy Richer; Elwen Rowlands
- Producers: Margery Bone; Mark Pybus
- Cinematography: David Luther; Tony Slater Ling
- Editors: Jamie Pearson; Sacha Szwarc
- Running time: 59 min (6 episodes)
- Production companies: Bonafide Films; The Forge

Original release
- Network: BBC One
- Release: 1 October – 5 November 2017

The Last Post is a British six-part television drama series first broadcast in the United Kingdom on BBC One from 1 October to 5 November 2017. It is set in the backdrop of the Aden Emergency and a unit of the Royal Military Police depicting the conflict and the relationships of the men and their families together and with the local population. In May 2018, it was reported that a second series would not be commissioned.

== Cast ==
- Jessie Buckley as Honor Martin
- Stephen Campbell Moore as Lieutenant Ed Laithwaite
- Amanda Drew as Mary Markham
- Ben Miles as Major Harry Markham
- Jeremy Neumark Jones as Captain Joe Martin
- Jessica Raine as Alison Laithwaite
- Ouidad Elma as Yusra Saeed
- Chris Reilly as Sergeant Alex Baxter
- Tom Glynn-Carney as Lance Corporal Tony Armstrong
- Louis Greatorex as Lance Corporal Paul Stoneham
- Richard Dillane as Harvey Tillbrook
- Kevin Sutton as Corporal Israel Orchover
- Essie Davis as Martha Franklin
- Toby Woolf as George Markham
- Aymen Hamdouchi as Kadir Hakim (Starfish)
- Joseph Kennedy as Captain Nick Page

== Episode list ==
No. in series	Title	Directed by	Written by	Original release date	UK viewers (millions)
1	"The New Man"	Jonny Campbell	Peter Moffat	1 October 2017	6.64
Captain Joe Martin arrives with his wife, Honor, in Aden to replace the outgoing Captain Nick Page. He soon has to adjust to life on the front line and some resentment among the men that he was appointed instead of the already present Lt Ed Laithwaite. Honor is taken under the wing of Laithwaite's wife, Alison, who had been having an affair with Captain Page. Terrorists try to shoot an officer and Captain Page and his driver are ambushed.
2	"Starfish"	Jonny Campbell	Peter Moffat	8 October 2017	5.69
Following the ambush the Royal Military Police assist special forces on a dangerous mission to capture an insurgent leader, Starfish. An American reporter, Martha Franklin, travels with the police unit to their rendezvous with the special forces. The special forces walk into a trap and Major Harry Markham in command of the police unit has the dilemma of assisting the special forces or returning to camp where his wife is having a difficult childbirth. He passes the decision to Captain Martin. Starfish uses the presence of the American reporter for a horrific atrocity.
3	"Above Thy Deep and Dreamless Sleep"	Jonny Campbell	Peter Moffat	15 October 2017	5.47
Starfish is reported captured by the paratroopers. Major Markham wants Martin to recover the photographic film of the atrocity taken by Martha Franklin. Mary Markham returns home with her new baby. Alison is pregnant with Captain Page's child and her outlandish behaviour shocks everybody but her husband. Honor congratulates Ed on Alison's pregnancy. Yusra who is the Markham's home help disappears with their son, George, leaving his football shirt to be found by Franklin.
4	"The CO's Boy"	Miranda Bowen	Peter Moffat and Mick Collins	22 October 2017	5.38
The RMP and other units mount a desperate search in the town for Yusra and George. The Royal Scots unit find George's teddy bear at Yusra's home. Yusra's mother and brother are arrested and her father killed escaping. Major Markham is encouraged to interview Starfish. Alison toys with the idea of self induced abortion. Honor discovers the film her husband had recovered and supposedly destroyed. Laithwaite receives information as to George's location and has to act before assistance arrives not without cost. Alison discovers she is carrying twins.
5	"Precious Cargo"	Miranda Bowen	Peter Moffat	29 October 2017	5.67
Laithwaite lies critically wounded in hospital. An 8mm film is received of George under threat of beheading. Mary Markham believes there is a message in the film from Yusra. A deadline of 18.00hrs is put on George's life unless an exchange is made for Kadir Hakim. Yusra sends a coded message of George's location. Major Markham's pleas to his superiors fall on deaf ears as Hakim is moved to the coast by Captain Martin and Corporal Armstrong; the two soldiers that know of George's whereabouts.
6	"The Bigger Picture"	Miranda Bowen	Peter Moffat	5 November 2017	5.84
Captain Martin is arrested for allowing the escape of a prisoner of war. Corporal Armstrong leaves camp to avoid arrest and help Yusra; only to discover her gone and her family burned alive in their home. Honor returns the film with the photographs of Starfish's atrocity to Martha Franklin. Laithwaite defends Martin at his trial. Martha Franklin meets with Starfish. Major Markham discovers written evidence of a planned secret meeting between a British Government minister and Starfish. Armstrong finds Yusra in the desert.

== Production ==
=== Conception ===
Executive producer of Bonafide Films' Margery Bone proposed a story about the British Army/Royal Military Police and life on a military base. She approached Peter Moffat who had a military family background. Moffat suggested setting the series in the 1960s at the end of the British Empire with military personnel posted with their wives to a strategically important place. This gave a way to explore twentieth century British attitudes through a tightly knit group of people.

=== Location ===
The producers needed a location similar to Aden with coast, mountains and desert and a colonial architectural influence, settling on Cape Town. A disused British naval base overlooking Simon's Town bay provided a scale which is often difficult to achieve for television.
