= Falling (TV series) =

British television series

- Genre: Romantic drama
- Created by: Jack Thorne
- Written by: Jack Thorne
- Directed by: Peter Hoar; Sasha Ransome
- Starring: Keeley Hawes; Paapa Essiedu; Rakie Ayola; Jason Watkins; Niamh Cusack; Adrian Scarborough; David Dawson
- Country of origin: United Kingdom
- Original language: English
- No. of series: 1
- No. of episodes: 6

Production
- Executive producers: George Osmond; George Faber; Jack Thorne; Peter Hoar
- Producer: Joe Donaldson
- Running time: 49 minutes
- Production company: The Forge

Original release
- Network: Channel 4
- Release: 19 May – 3 June 2026

Falling is a six-part British romantic drama television series written by Jack Thorne. It aired on Channel 4 from 19 May to 3 June 2026. The cast is led by Keeley Hawes and Paapa Essiedu, alongside Rakie Ayola, Jason Watkins, Niamh Cusack, Adrian Scarborough and David Dawson.

The series premiered on 19 May 2026.

== Premise ==
A nun falls in love with a Catholic priest. Both are deeply committed to their work in the church and in their community. Neither are expected to fall in love. But when they do, both are forced to wrestle with what it means for them, their vows, and their relationship with God.

== Cast ==
- Keeley Hawes as Anna
  - Eloise Little as young Anna
- Paapa Essiedu as David
- Rakie Ayola as Muriel
- Jason Watkins as Peter
- Niamh Cusack as Francesca
- Adrian Scarborough as Francis
- David Dawson as Phil
- Susan Brown as Fiona
- Sandra Voe as Gertrude
- Sophie Stone as Susan
- Holly Rhys as Tina
- Shayde Sinclair as Bimpe

== Episodes ==
No.	Title	Directed by	Written by	Original release date	UK viewers (millions)
1	"Episode 1"	Peter Hoar	Jack Thorne	19 May 2026	N/A
2	"Episode 2"	Peter Hoar	Jack Thorne	20 May 2026	N/A
3	"Episode 3"	Peter Hoar	Jack Thorne	26 May 2026	N/A
4	"Episode 4"	Sasha Ransome	Jack Thorne	27 May 2026	N/A
5	"Episode 5"	Sasha Ransome	Jack Thorne	2 June 2026	N/A
6	"Episode 6"	Sasha Ransome	Jack Thorne	3 June 2026	N/A

== Production ==
The series is written by Jack Thorne and produced by The Forge. It was announced as an upcoming series for Channel 4 in February 2025.

In April 2025, Keeley Hawes and Paapa Essiedu were confirmed to be leading the cast, alongside Rakie Ayola, Jason Watkins, Niamh Cusack, Adrian Scarborough, David Dawson, Susan Brown, Sandra Voe and newcomers, Holly Rhys and Shayde Sinclair.

Principal photography began in April 2025, with locations include Bristol and Cardiff, Wales.

== Reception ==
On the review aggregator Rotten Tomatoes, the series holds an approval rating of 73% based on 11 reviews, with an average rating of 6.5/10.

Ben Dowell at The Times awarded the series five stars, describing it as "spellbinding" and Hawes' performance as "exceptional". Vicky Jessop at Metro awarded four stars, describing the "unusual love story" as "one of 2026’s best TV surprises".

Cosmopolitan described the series as a "must-watch" and Hawes' best since Bodyguard. The Telegraph described writer Jack Thorne's script as "characteristically elegant" and Hawes' performance as "divine". Financial Times also commented on the script, noting it as having a "refreshing maturity", further describing the show as "quietly powerful" but an "old-fashioned and wordy drama", ultimately awarding it three stars. Writing for the Radio Times, Gabriel Tate called the show "thoughtful, warm, witty, complex and chock-full of the sort of intimate one-to-one conversations in which Thorne specialises," giving it four stars.

Lucy Mangan of The Guardian was less positive, awarding the series just two stars, describing it as "a swing and a miss...despite the talented actors at the helm". Jayne Manfredi of the Church Times was similarly lukewarm, describing the drama as "beautifully-shot" but offering only "surface-level observation" of the themes presented.
