= The Lakes (TV series) =

British TV drama series (1997)

- Genre: Drama
- Created by: Jimmy McGovern
- Written by: Joe Ainsworth; William Gaminara; Julie Rutterford
- Directed by: David Blair; Bill Anderson; Sallie Aprahamian; David Moore; Roberto Bangura
- Starring: John Simm; Emma Cunniffe; Kaye Wragg; Mary Jo Randle; Paul Copley; Robert Pugh; Charles Dale; Kevin Doyle; Elizabeth Rider
- Composer: Nina Humphreys
- Country of origin: United Kingdom
- Original language: English
- No. of series: 2
- No. of episodes: 14

Production
- Executive producers: Charles Pattinson; George Faber; Suzan Harrison; Lynn Horsford
- Producer: Matthew Bird
- Cinematography: Andy Collins
- Editor: Luke Dunkley
- Running time: 90 minutes (pilot); 50 minutes (Series 1); 40 minutes (Series 2)
- Production company: Company Pictures

Original release
- Network: BBC1
- Release: 14 September 1997 – 14 March 1999

The Lakes is a British television drama series, created and principally written by Jimmy McGovern, first broadcast on BBC1 on 14 September 1997. Mainly filmed in and around Patterdale and The Ullswater Hotel, Glenridding, the series stars John Simm as Danny Kavanagh, a hotel porter, compulsive gambler, and philanderer who escapes from the dole queues in Liverpool to live in the Lake District. After he meets and marries local girl Emma Quinlan (Emma Cunniffe), they move back to Liverpool. However Danny's gambling habit results in Emma moving back to the Lakes. Months later Danny also returns, takes up a job looking after a rowing boat concession and starts to patch up his relationship with Emma.

Two series were broadcast. The first, of four episodes including a feature-length pilot, aired during September and October 1997. A second series extended to ten episodes, broadcast from January to March 1999. McGovern described the series as "partially autobiographical", having also been a gambling addict and having met his wife, Eileen, while working at a hotel in Cumbria. McGovern's involvement in the second series was heavily reduced, with a number of co-writers contributing, including Joe Ainsworth, William Gaminara and Julie Rutterford. The series was critically acclaimed when first broadcast, although it caused controversy owing to the hard-hitting portrayal of an immoral British sub-culture and scenes of sex and violence. The series was considered a springboard for many members of the cast, including Kaye Wragg, James Thornton, Kevin Doyle and Elizabeth Berrington.

== Merchandise ==
The complete series was released as a four-disc box set by Second Sight Media on 6 October 2003. The set contains additional commentaries for the first series by John Simm and director David Blair. The box set was re-issued on 16 April 2012, however both the original and re-issue are now out of print. Region 4 DVD released rated the series R16 for offensive language and scenes of a sexual nature. In late 2023 it was re-rated M in New Zealand for sex scenes, offensive language and nudity.

A novelisation of the first series by Kate Lock (credited as K.M. Lock) was released on 4 September 1997, ten days prior to the broadcast of the first episode. A soundtrack to the series was also issued on CD and Cassette in 1997, containing contributions from the likes of Blur, Cast, Echo and the Bunnymen, the Manic Street Preachers, Supergrass and Radiohead.

== Plot ==
One of the principal filming locations for the series, the Inn on the Lake Hotel

=== Series 1 (1997) ===
After leaving the Lakes to move to Liverpool, Emma (Emma Cunniffe) decides to return home after her husband Danny's gambling addiction begins to grow progressively stronger. Months later, Danny follows her and takes up a job looking after a rowing-boat concession. Meanwhile he is forced to reject the unsubtle advances of the attention-seeking Lucy Archer (Kaye Wragg), who, unable to take the pain of rejection, becomes determined to take revenge. When three schoolgirls drown in a boating accident while Danny is on duty at work, he is unwilling to tell the truth, having been distracted by betting over the telephone – despite promising Emma that he would stop gambling. As the community looks for someone to blame, Lucy lies to the police to implicate him.

=== Series 2 (1999) ===
When Lucy is raped by three locals, only Danny, enduring the claustrophobic hostility of the Quinlan family home, can testify as a witness – which puts him at odds with the village, his wife and her family.

== Cast ==
=== Main ===
- John Simm as Danny Kavanagh
- Emma Cunniffe as Emma Kavanagh – Danny's wife, daughter of Bernie and Peter
- Kaye Wragg as Lucy Archer – Cecil and Doreen's daughter
- Mary Jo Randle as Bernie Quinlan – Emma's mother, who is a devout Catholic
- Paul Copley as Peter Quinlan – Emma's father
- Elizabeth Rider as Sheila Thwaite – Bernie's sister
- David Westhead as Arthur Thwaite – Sheila's husband (1.1 – 2.1)
- Robert Pugh as Father Matthew – the local parish priest
- Charles Dale as Gary Alcock – hotel chef and renowned sex addict
- Kevin Doyle as John Parr/Fisher – a school headteacher
- Clare Holman as Simone Parr/Fisher – nymphomaniac wife of John, lover of Gary
- Elizabeth Bennett as Doreen Archer – a local hotel owner
- Nicholas Day as Cecil Archer – Doreen's husband
- Elizabeth Berrington as Ruth Alcock – Gary's wife
- Bob Mason as Sergeant Eddie Slater – a local policeman
- Tony Rohr as Grandad – Bernie Quinlan and Sheila Thwaite's father
- James Thornton as Pete Quinlan – Emma's brother
- Jessica Perry as Annie Quinlan – Bernie and Peter's youngest child
- Barbara Wilshere as Sarah Kilbride – a local GP and closet lesbian
- Matt Bardock as Albie – a chirpy Cockney
- Robin Laing as Joey – a local who always speaks in the third person
- Lee Oakes as Tharmy – a local who has a stutter
- Samantha Seager as Julie

=== Supporting ===
- Marshall Lancaster as Ged Hodgson (2.1 – 2.9)
- Annabelle Apsion as Beverly Fisher – Simone's sister (2.2 – 2.10)
- Amanda Mealing as Jo Jo Spiers – schoolteacher (2.1 – 2.8)
- Joel Phillimore as Thomas Alcock – Gary's son (2.1 – 2.7)
- Robert Morgan as Charles Kilbride – Sarah's husband (2.1 – 2.4)
- Ryan Pope as Robert (1.1 – 1.4)
- Justin Brady as Billy Jennings (2.3 – 2.5)
- Debbie Chazen as Delilah – a friend of Emma's (1.1 – 1.4)
- Jenna Scruton as Paula Thwaite – Sheila and Arthur's daughter (1.1 – 1.3)
- Sally Rogers as Juliet Bray – owner of the boatyard (1.1 – 1.4)
- Kate Fitzgerald as 'Mam' Kavanagh – Danny's mother (1.1)
- Arthur Kelly as 'Dad' Kavanagh – Danny's father (1.1)
- Anthony Newley as the Bishop – Bishop of the local parish (2.8)

== Episodes ==
=== Series overview ===
Series	Episodes	Originally released	
Series	Episodes	First released	Last released
1	4	14 September 1997	5 October 1997
2	10	10 January 1999	21 February 1999

=== Series 1 (1997) ===
No. overall	No. in series	Title	Directed by	Written by	Original release date
1	1	"Episode 1"	David Blair	Jimmy McGovern	14 September 1997
Danny Kavanagh, a compulsive gambler and lout, looking to start afresh, arrives in a small village in the Lake District and manages to get a job at a local hotel, working as a kitchen porter under tyrannical, sex-mad chef Gary Alcock. However, it's not long before he's taken a shine to local girl Emma, and after a series of short rendezvous, Emma discovers she is pregnant. She and Danny decide to marry and move back to Danny's hometown in Liverpool, where Danny has acquired them a flat. However, despite promising to stop gambling, Danny soon finds himself flittering away his wages on the dogs, and an angered Emma decides she has no choice but to leave him and move back home. Some months later, after serving a prison sentence for theft, Danny returns to the Lakes in search of Emma, and he takes up a job at the local rowing boat concession. However, after leaving his workstation to phone in a bet, Danny is horrified to discover that a group of schoolgirls who have skipped out of school in their teacher's absence have stolen a boat and gone out onto the lake. When the boat overturns, Danny leaps to the rescue in attempt to prevent the girls from drowning.
2	2	"Episode 2"	David Blair	Jimmy McGovern	21 September 1997
Despite his best efforts, Danny is unable to save the schoolgirls. A rescue operation is mounted, and the body of Paula Thwaite is recovered from the lake. As an inconsolable Sheila begins to come to terms with her daughter's death, Danny comes under intense scrutiny from the locals, despite claiming that the girls took the boat out while his back was turned. Danny's involvement is further suspected when an angry Lucy lies to the police and claims that she witnessed Danny taking money from the girls and helping them push the boat out onto the lake. Not wanting to admit that he was on the telephone betting at the time of the tragedy, Danny is evasive during police interview and Sergeant Slater struggles to believe his version of events.
3	3	"Episode 3"	David Blair	Jimmy McGovern	28 September 1997
Danny questions John as to why he left the children unattended. Lucy continues to wreck what little is left of Danny's reputation amongst the local community. Danny confides in Father Matthew that he was on the phone to the bookies at the time of the accident, and Father Matthew urges him to go to the police and admit the truth. Paula's funeral turns into an emotional hotbed when Father Matthew proclaims Danny as a hero, much to Sheila's disgust. Ruth begins to grow tired of Gary's extra marital affairs and seeks comfort in the arms of a keen-eyed Albie. Bernie's passion for Father Matthew continues to grow, but the attraction hasn't gone unnoticed by Peter, who suspecting Bernie of having an affair, confronts Father Matthew demanding to know the truth.
4	4	"Episode 4"	David Blair	Jimmy McGovern	5 October 1997
Danny continues to try to avoid telling the truth about the accident. Cecil overhears a commotion in one of the empty hotel rooms and bursts in to find Lucy in a compromising position with Gary. Gary is later the victim of a hit-and-run which leaves him with life threatening injuries, but the police are unable to determine who was responsible. Meanwhile, as the inquest into the tragic accident gets underway, Danny and Lucy are called to give evidence. Lucy's tirade of lies are finally unpicked when Father Matthew provides the coroner with information which exonerates Danny, but ultimately destroys what little relationship with Emma he had left. Danny decides he has little choice but to give up and makes the heartbreaking decision to take his own life.

=== Series 2 (1999) ===
No. overall	No. in series	Title	Directed by	Written by	Original release date	UK viewers (millions)
5	1	"Episode 1"	Bill Anderson	Jimmy McGovern	10 January 1999	7.26
Danny is contemplating suicide after being made to feel an outcast after admitting to his wife Emma that he had been gambling again. Simone leaves John and confesses to him that she had several other lovers prior to Gary. Enraged, he bludgeons her to death in the bath.
6	2	"Episode 2"	Bill Anderson	Jimmy McGovern	17 January 1999	7.33
The forbidden passion between Father Matthew and married parishioner Bernie Quinlan is about to erupt. Parr is struggling to summon up the courage to dispose of his wife's body when his sister-in-law Beverly turns up.
7	3	"Episode 3"	Bill Anderson	Joe Ainsworth	24 January 1999	7.05
With flies buzzing round the boot of his car, John is finding it harder to hide his wife's murder from her flirtatious sister. Danny is trying to be a responsible father, but he also wants some fun. Bernie is still troubled by her conscience. Dr Kilbride is called to school to treat a pupil where her former lesbian lover Jo Jo is the new teacher.
8	4	"Episode 4"	Sallie Aprahamian	Joe Ainsworth	31 January 1999	7.43
Beverly is still besotted by John and helps him to destroy all the evidence of Simone's murder. Lucy plays with fire when she joins the local lads for a game of pool. Jo Jo wants to restart her relationship with Dr Kilbride.
9	5	"Episode 5"	Sallie Aprahamian	Joe Ainsworth	7 February 1999	7.00
Lucy has to decide whether to report her rape by Billy, Ged and Peter, fearing that her previous lies about Danny's involvement in the drownings could count against her. Danny tells Emma that her mother is not as saintly as she tries to make out.
10	6	"Episode 6"	Sallie Aprahamian	Julie Rutterford	14 February 1999	N/A
Bernie discovers she is pregnant with Father Matthew's baby. Danny tells Lucy that he knows she was raped. Sergeant Slater's dog Syndrome uncovers something interesting in the lake.
11	7	"Episode 7"	David Moore	William Gaminara	21 February 1999	6.80
John Parr gets his revenge against Gary by kidnapping his son, while the police start to piece together the facts about Simone's murder. Danny is thrown out by the Quinlans when he tells them he will be a witness on behalf of Lucy Archer, against Pete Quinlan and his two co-defendants. Mrs Archer is upset about the backlash that has resulted from her daughter's allegations. Bernie tells Father Matthew about her pregnancy.
12	8	"Episode 8"	David Moore	Jimmy McGovern	28 February 1999	6.79
Father Matthew and Bernie visit the Bishop (Anthony Newley) for advice on how to deal with the unwanted baby. Sergeant Slater tries to get the truth out of John. Danny and Lucy talk about their true feelings for each other.
13	9	"Episode 9"	Roberto Bangura	William Gaminara	7 March 1999	N/A
Lucy takes to the stand in court to give her account of the night she was raped. Her evidence reveals to Emma that Danny has been telling her the truth. Peter reacts with fury when he learns of Bernie's affair. Beverly pays a visit to John in prison.
14	10	"Episode 10"	Roberto Bangura	Joe Ainsworth	14 March 1999	N/A
Bernie must choose between Peter and Father Matthew. Danny tries to save his marriage to Emma, in light of Lucy's announcement in court. The audience is also led to believe that, eventually, Gary's "judgement day" arrives as, he waits in a hotel room, whilst tied to a bed.
