= The Forge Entertainment =

British television production company

- Type: Subsidiary
- Industry: Television; Film
- Genre: Scripted
- Founded: 2014; 12 years ago
- Founders: George Faber
- Headquarters: London, United Kingdom
- Key people: George Faber (Executive Chairman); George Ormond (Joint Managing Director); Beth Willis (Joint Managing Director)
- Parent: Banijay UK (2023–present)
- Website: theforgeentertainment.co.uk

The Forge is a British television production company founded by George Faber and owned by Banijay UK.

== History ==
The Forge was formed in 2014 by George Faber with the aim of developing and producing original and innovative television drama, working in collaboration with the UK's leading and emerging creative talent. Faber had previously founded Company Pictures in 1998. George Ormond joined at the company's inception, with Channel 4’s former Drama Commissioner Beth Willis joining in 2018.

Following its acquisition by Banijay UK in 2023, The Forge has continued to develop scripted drama for both UK broadcasters and international streamers.

In 2026, it was announced that Faber would become the company's Executive Director, with Executive Producers Ormond and Willis becoming joint Managing Directors.

== Productions ==
The company's first major success came with National Treasure (2016), a four-part Channel 4 drama written by Jack Thorne and directed by Marc Munden. Starring Robbie Coltrane and Julie Walters, the series, inspired by Operation Yewtree, explored the personal and public fallout of historic sexual abuse allegations. The series received four nominations at the 2016 RTS Awards and won the BAFTA for Best Mini-Series and a Peabody Award.

This was followed by The Miniaturist (2017), a BBC adaptation of Jessie Burton’s novel, starring Anya Taylor-Joy. In the same year, The Forge debuted Ackley Bridge (2017–2022), a long-running Channel 4 series set in a multicultural Yorkshire community, noted for its ensemble cast and focus on social realism, and The Last Post, a BBC drama set in the backdrop of the Aden Emergency, starring Jessie Buckley.

In 2018, The Forge released Collateral, a BBC Two thriller written by David Hare and directed by S. J. Clarkson, starring Carey Mulligan, Billie Piper and John Simm. That year also saw the broadcast of Kiri on Channel 4, starring Sarah Lancashire, a drama praised for its examination of race, class and child protection, which went on to receive multiple BAFTA nominations. The following year, Lancashire also starred in The Accident, a Channel 4 miniseries based on a fictional Welsh community's fight for justice after a fatal explosion on a construction site.

The Forge expanded into political drama with Roadkill (2020), a BBC One series starring Hugh Laurie as a government minister whose public career is threatened by personal scandal. The series won Best Original Music at the BAFTA TV Craft Awards.

In 2021, the company produced Help, a feature-length Channel 4 drama written by Jack Thorne and directed by Marc Munden, starring Jodie Comer and Stephen Graham. Set in a care home during the COVID-19 pandemic, the film received widespread acclaim and won the International Emmy Award for Best TV Movie and the Rose d'Or for Best Drama.

In 2022, The Forge produced Rules of the Game, a BBC One drama examining workplace culture and institutional misconduct, and Marriage, a BBC One relationship drama starring Sean Bean and Nicola Walker. That year also marked an international expansion with Becoming Elizabeth, a historical drama for American pay-TV network Starz, focusing on the early life of Elizabeth I.

In 2023, the BBC announced that it had commissioned a three-part factual drama series based on the Grenfell Tower tragedy, to be written and directed by Peter Kosminsky. That year then saw a significant increase in The Forge’s partnerships with global streaming platforms. The Buccaneers, an Apple TV adaptation of Edith Wharton’s unfinished novel, features a predominantly younger cast alongside Christina Hendricks and was renewed for a third series in 2025. This was followed by Shardlake (2024), a Disney+ historical mystery adapted by Stephen Butchard, and Generation Z (2024), a comedy horror series for Channel 4.

The Forge's second comedy drama, Just Act Normal for BBC Three, was released in 2025 and won writer Janice Okoh a BAFTA for Best Emerging Talent Award.

In March 2026, The Forge released A Woman of Substance, a period adaptation of Barbara Taylor Bradford’s 1979 novel of the same name, starring Brenda Blethyn. The series was renewed by Channel 4 in June 2026. In May of the same year, Falling, a romantic drama written by Jack Thorne, starring Keeley Hawes and Paapa Essiedu, was also released on Channel 4.

In May 2026, the BBC announced their commission of legal drama Reputation from The Forge, written by Anya Reiss.

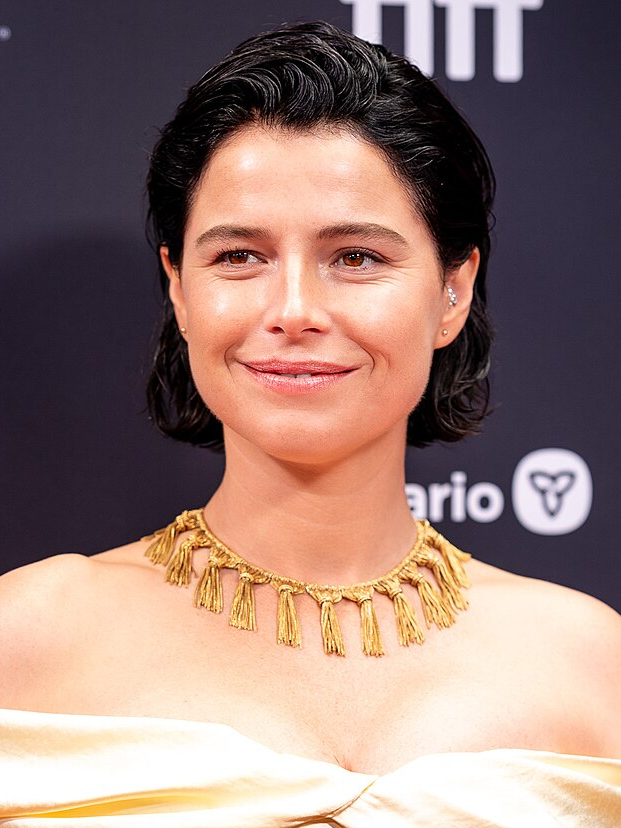
Jessie Buckley starred as Honor Martin in The Last Post for BBC One.

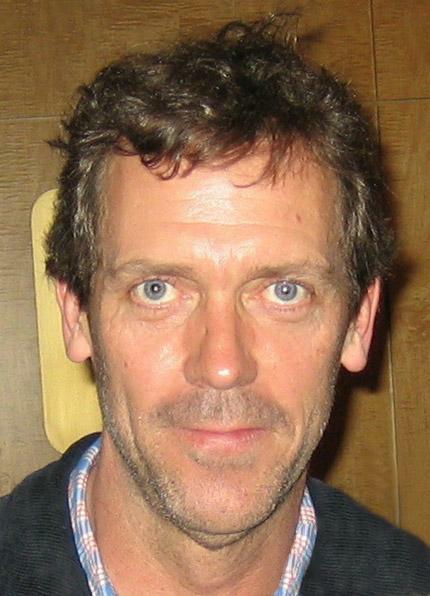
Hugh Laurie starred as Peter Laurence in Roadkill for BBC One.

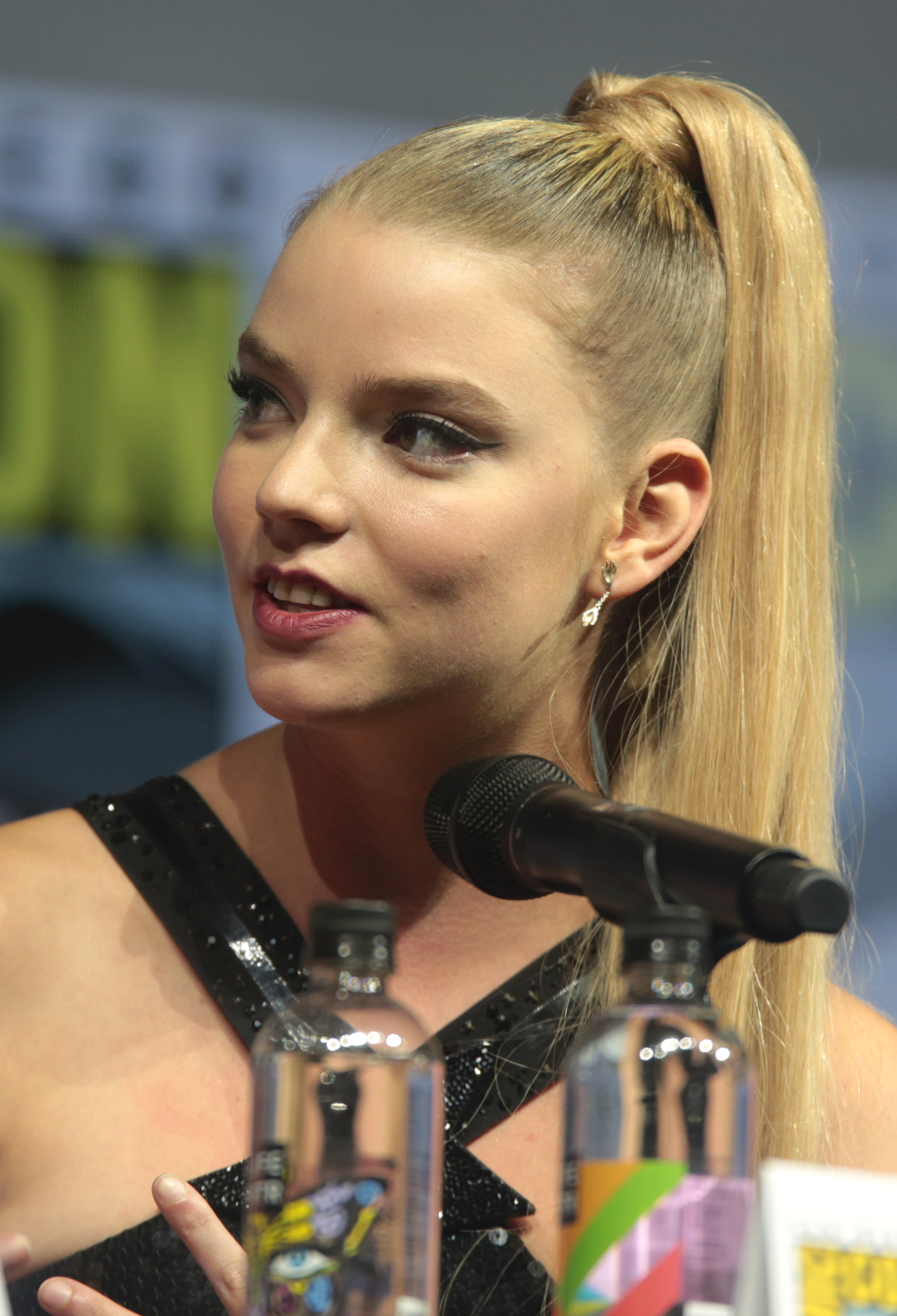
Anya Taylor-Joy starred as Petronella Oortman in The Miniaturist for BBC One.

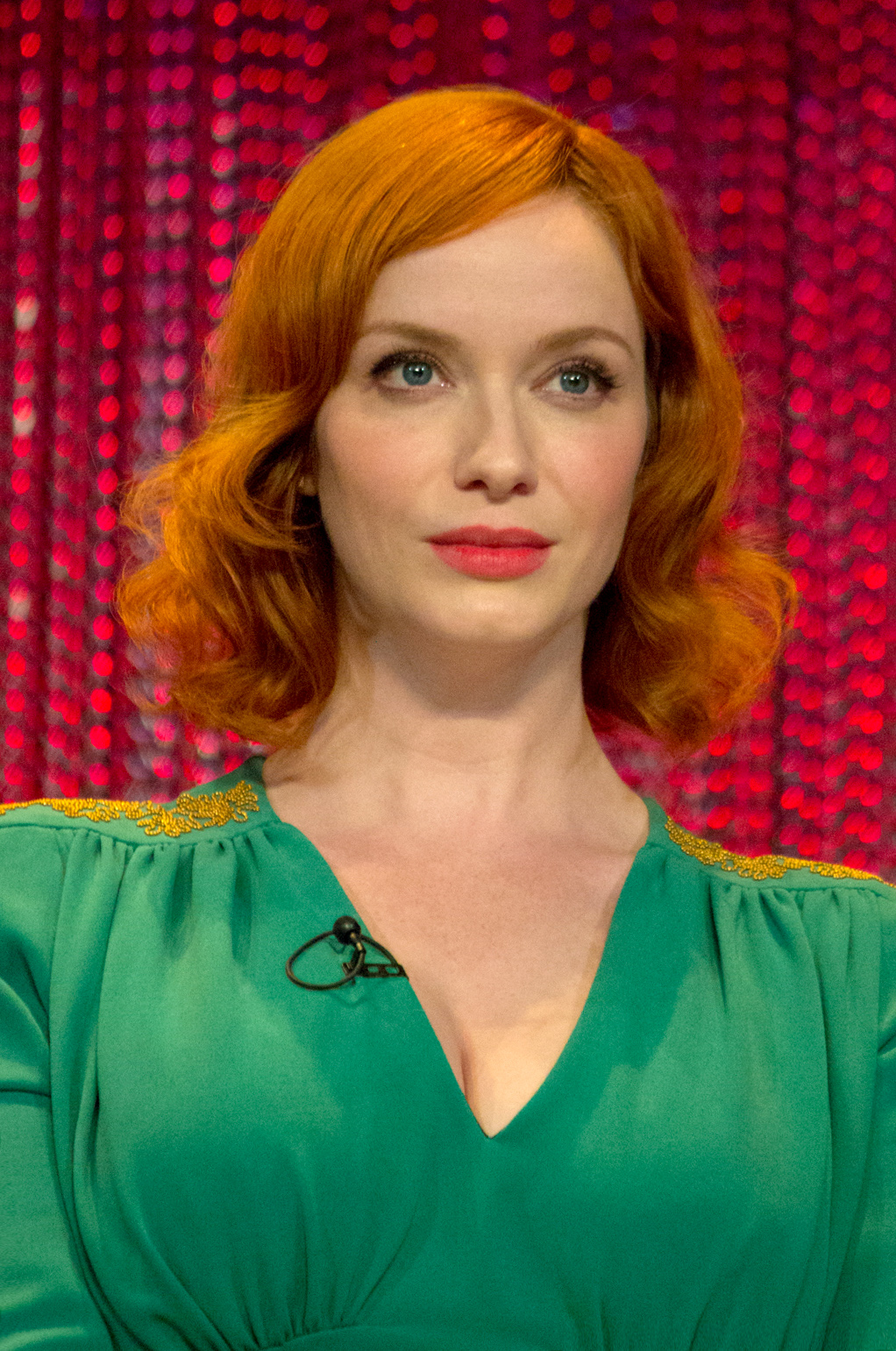
Christina Hendricks stars in The Buccaneers for Apple TV and Reputation for BBC One.

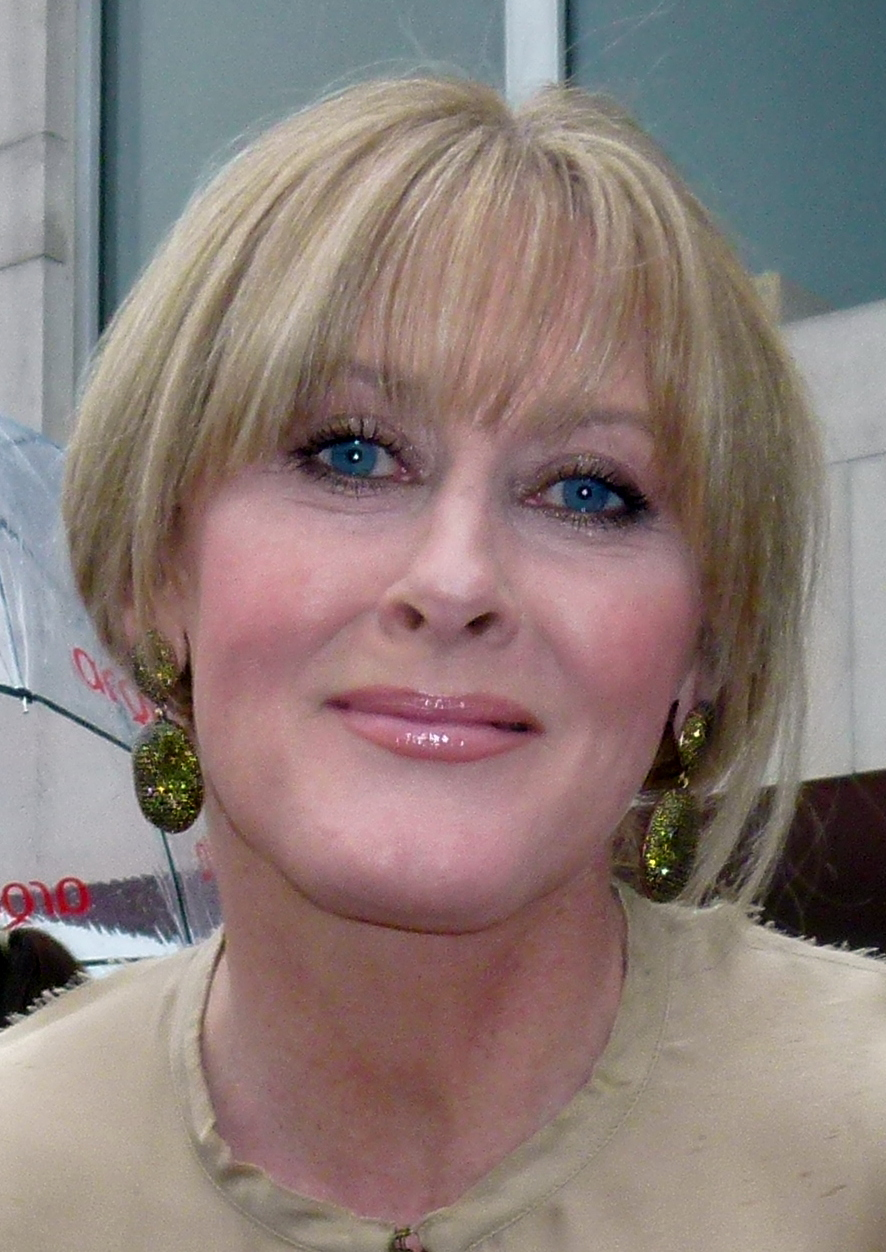
Sarah Lancashire starred in The Accident and Kiri, both for Channel 4.

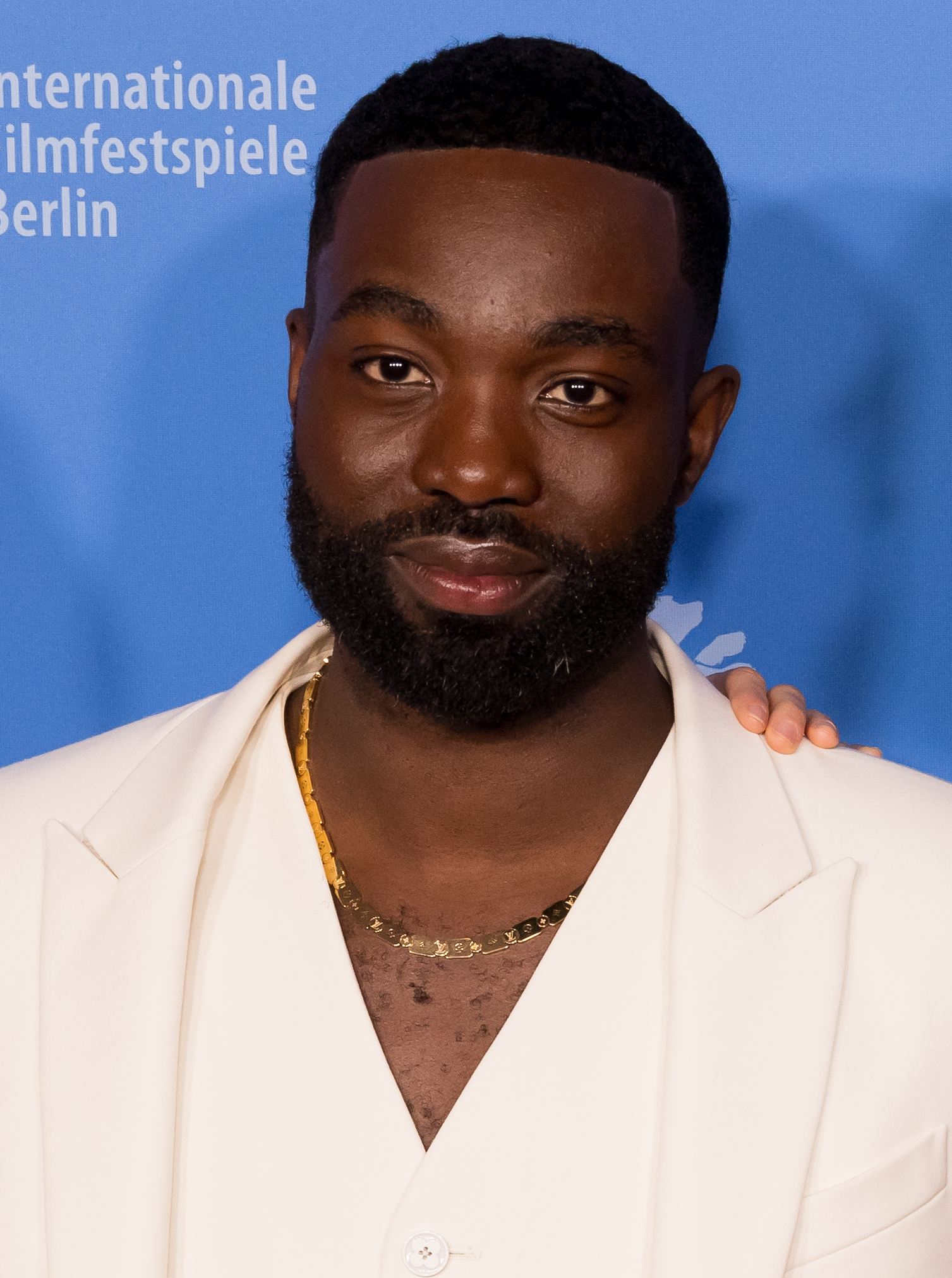
Paapa Essiedu starred in Falling for Channel 4.

== Awards and nominations ==
Year(s)	Show	Broadcaster	Notes
2016	National Treasure	Channel 4	Won - BAFTA for Best Miniseries Won - BAFTA Craft for Best Director - Fiction (Marc Munden) Won - BAFTA Craft for Best Original Television Music (Juan Cristóbal Tapia de Veer) Won - Peabody Award Nominated - RTS for Best Writer - Drama (Jack Thorne) Nominated - BAFTA Craft for Best Photography and Lighting – Fiction (Ole Birkeland) Nominated - BAFTA Craft for Best Editing – Fiction (Luke Dunkley)
2017	The Miniaturist	BBC One	Won - Ivor Novello for Best Television Soundtrack (Dan Jones) Nominated - BAFTA Craft Award for Make-Up & Hair Design (Christina Baker) Nominated - RTS Craft & Design for Make Up & Hair Design (Christina Baker) Nominated - RTS Craft & Design for Original Score (Dan Jones) Nominated - RTS Craft & Design for Best Television Soundtrack (Dan Jones)
2017	The Last Post	BBC One	Nominated - BAFTA Scotland for Best Television Script
2017–2022	Ackley Bridge	Channel 4	Nominated - RTS for Best Drama Series (2018) Nominated - RTS for Best Drama Series (2019)
2018	Collateral	BBC Two, Netflix	Nominated - BAFTA Craft for Best Photography and Lighting – Fiction (Balazs Bolygo)
2018	Kiri	Channel 4	Won - BAFTA Cymru for Best Director (Euros Lyn) Nominated - BAFTA for Best Mini-Series
2019	The Accident	Channel 4	
2019	Dark Money	BBC One	
2020	Roadkill	BBC One	Won - BAFTA Craft for Best Original Music (Harry Escott)
2021	Help	Channel 4	Won - Rose d'Or for Best Drama Won - RTS for Best Single Drama Won - International Emmy for Best Miniseries Nominated - BAFTA for Best Single Drama
2022	Rules of the Game	BBC One	Nominated - Broadcast Tech Innovation Award for Grading - Scripted (Ross Baker)
2022	Marriage	BBC One	Nominated - RTS Craft & Design for Editing - Drama (Simon Reglar)
2022	Becoming Elizabeth	Starz	Nominated - RTS Craft & Design for Best Photography - Drama & Comedy (Adolpho Veloso)
2023–present	The Buccaneers	Apple TV	Nominated - GLAAD Media Award for Outstanding New Series (2024) Nominated - GLAAD Media Award for Outstanding Drama Series (2026) Nominated - Broadcast Digital Award for Best Drama Programme (2026) Nominated - BAFTA Scotland Award for Scripted Television Series (2026)
2024	Shardlake	Disney+	Nominated - Hollywood Music in Media Award for Best Original Score - TV (Alex Heffes)
2024	Generation Z	Channel 4	Finalist - NYF TV & Film Awards - Series
2025	Just Act Normal	BBC Three	Won - BAFTA Craft for Best Emerging Talent: Fiction (Janice Okoh) Nominated - Edinburgh TV Award for Breakthrough Performance (Chenée Taylor)
2026–present	A Woman of Substance	Channel 4	Nominated - National Television Awards for Best New Drama Nominated - Seoul International Drama Awards for Best Miniseries
2026	Falling	Channel 4	
TBA	Grenfell	BBC One	
TBA	Reputation	BBC One	
