= Ray Stevenson =

British actor (1964–2023)

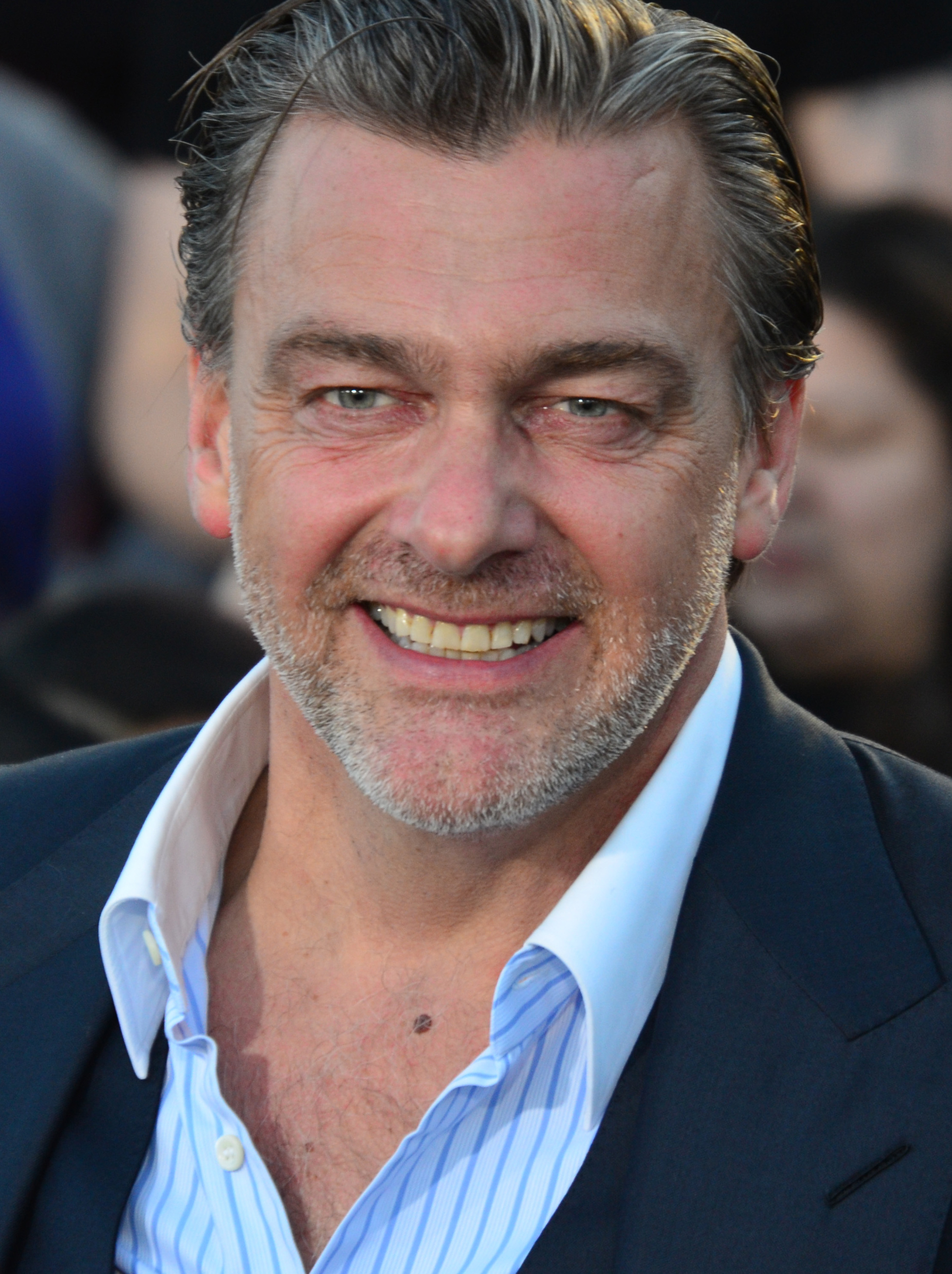
- Stevenson in 2014
- Born: George Raymond Stevenson; 25 May 1964; Lisburn, Northern Ireland
- Died: 21 May 2023 (aged 58); Ischia, Campania, Italy
- Education: Bristol Old Vic Theatre School
- Occupation: Actor
- Years active: 1993–2023
- Height: 6 ft 3 in (191 cm)
- Spouse(s): Ruth Gemmell (m. 1997; div. 2005) Elisabetta Caraccia
- Children: 3

George Raymond Stevenson (25 May 1964 – 21 May 2023) was a Northern Irish actor, best known for his film and television work. He had a starring role as legionary Titus Pullo on the BBC/HBO television series Rome (2005–2007), and portrayed two Marvel Comics characters: Frank Castle / The Punisher in Punisher: War Zone (2008) and The Super Hero Squad Show (2009), and Volstagg in the Marvel Cinematic Universe (2011–2017).

His other notable film roles included Dagonet in King Arthur (2004), mobster Danny Greene in Kill the Irishman (2011), Porthos in The Three Musketeers (also 2011), and the villainous Governor-General Scott Buxton in RRR (2022). His television roles include Ukrainian mobster Isaak Sirko in the seventh season of Dexter (2012), for which he received a Saturn Award nomination; Blackbeard in the third and fourth seasons of Black Sails (2016–2017), Gar Saxon in Star Wars Rebels (2016–2017) and Star Wars: The Clone Wars (2020), Othere in 11 episodes of Vikings (2020), and Baylan Skoll in Ahsoka (2023). Stevenson was married to English actress Ruth Gemmell for eight years. Later, he married an Italian anthropologist, Elisabetta Caraccia, and had three sons.

== Early life ==
George Raymond Stevenson was born in Lisburn in County Antrim, Northern Ireland, on 25 May 1964, the second of three sons. His father was a Royal Air Force pilot. He moved to England with his family at the age of eight, first settling in the Lemington area of Newcastle upon Tyne and later in Seaton Delaval. He attended a design course at Bath Lane College (Newcastle upon Tyne), then the Bristol Old Vic Theatre School, graduating at the age of 29.

== Career ==
=== Film ===
Stevenson made his film debut in The Theory of Flight (1998) as a gigolo hired to help Helena Bonham Carter's character lose her virginity. In 2002, he starred in the short film No Man's Land, which was the antipodal picture from actor/director Edward Hicks before he graduated from the London Film School. In the 12-minute film, set during World War I, Stevenson portrayed an experienced private who is forced to help a novice officer (David Birkin) back to safety after they both find themselves trapped and isolated in "No Man's Land" during the Battle of Ypres. In 2004, he starred in King Arthur as Dagonet, a knight of the round table who sacrifices his life for his comrades. His first leading role in a film was in the Scottish horror picture Outpost (2008), portraying a mercenary pitted against Nazi zombies in a bunker somewhere in Eastern Europe. That same year, he also starred in Punisher: War Zone, as Frank Castle / The Punisher, a former United States Marine turned vigilante after his family was murdered. In 2010, he played an antagonist in the comedy The Other Guys.

In 2011, Stevenson appeared in the film Kill the Irishman, based on the book To Kill the Irishman: The War That Crippled the Mafia, as Danny Greene, the Irish mob boss who took on the Italian-American Cleveland crime family during the 1970s. He starred as Volstagg, one of Thor's trusted comrades, in the 2011 Marvel film Thor. Also that year, he played Porthos in Paul W. S. Anderson's adaptation of The Three Musketeers. He played Firefly in G.I. Joe: Retaliation, released in 2013. He appeared in the Finnish-American thriller film Big Game. In 2014, he starred in the film Divergent, based on the first book of The Divergent Series. He reprised his role in the sequels, The Divergent Series: Insurgent, released in March 2015, and The Divergent Series: Allegiant, released in March 2016.

In 2019, Stevenson was announced as a lead antagonist in the Telugu film RRR, directed by S. S. Rajamouli and released in 2022. This marked his debut in Indian cinema.

=== Television ===
Stevenson played legionary Titus Pullo in the BBC/HBO series Rome. His other television work included guest appearances in Waking the Dead, Murphy's Law and lead roles in City Central and At Home with the Braithwaites. He also appeared in TV films, including Some Kind of Life in 1995, and The Return of the Native. Some of his earliest parts were in two Catherine Cookson films: The Dwelling Place (1994) and The Tide of Life (1996). Stevenson reprised his role as the Punisher as a voice actor in The Super Hero Squad Show and played the role of Isaak Sirko in the seventh season of Dexter in 2012.

On 24 March 2015, it was announced by producers that Stevenson would be joining the cast of the Starz series Black Sails as the character Edward Teach. Stevenson also appeared in Season 6 of the series Vikings as Othere, which ran from 2013 to 2020. He also appeared in Season 3 of the series Das Boot as Commander Jack Swinburne in 2022.

At Star Wars Celebration 2023, Stevenson was announced as playing the Dark Jedi Baylan Skoll in Ahsoka, a miniseries debuting on Disney+. After the series' debut following Stevenson's death, Stevenson's Skoll quickly became a fan favorite. In an interview on Stevenson's part, showrunner Dave Filoni noted that when he was told to play Skoll as a villain, "[Stevenson] was like, 'I don't think so.' I'm like, 'Okay, I appreciate that you don't think so, and Baylan wouldn't think he's the villain, but you are a villain in this.' And he's like, 'We'll see.' It was perfect." Stevenson also offered input on the design of his character's lightsaber hilt.

Stevenson's performance in Ahsoka also received considerable praise from critics. Metro described his work as "one of the highlights of the entire Star Wars series", while Collider described Stevenson as having "an inescapable gravitas" and that he "gave a masterclass in character building". After Stevenson's death, Rory McCann took over the role for the second season.

=== Stage ===
Stevenson's stage work included playing the part of Jesus Christ in the York Mystery Plays in 2000 at York Minster. In 2001, he took the part of Roger in the play Mouth to Mouth by Kevin Elyot, at the Albery Theatre in London with Lindsay Duncan and Michael Maloney. His best-known part was perhaps that of the Cardinal in The Duchess of Malfi by John Webster with Janet McTeer at the Royal National Theatre in 2003.

== Personal life ==
In 1997, Stevenson married English actress Ruth Gemmell in London; they had met on the set of Band of Gold (1995), and later played a married couple in Peak Practice (1997). They divorced in 2005 after eight years of marriage. Stevenson remarried an Italian anthropologist, Elisabetta Caraccia, and had three sons.

== Death ==
On 21 May 2023, Stevenson died at the age of 58. Although his cause of death is unknown, he was reportedly hospitalised while working on an action movie Cassino in Ischia at the island of Ischia in Campania, Italy. Stevenson's co-stars, including Rosario Dawson, Scott Adkins, and James Purefoy, paid tribute. Stevenson's role in Cassino in Ischia was taken over by Dominic Purcell.

The first episode of Ahsoka, released on 22 August 2023, just over three months after Stevenson's death, includes a dedication to him, "For our friend, Ray". Ivanna Sakhno, who played Shin Hati, Stevenson's screen apprentice in Ahsoka, wrote in commemoration that she would be "forever his Wolf", in tribute to their characters being named after the two wargs who pursued the moon and sun in Norse mythology. Stevenson is succeeded in the role of Skoll by Rory McCann in Ahsoka's second season. McCann was a good friend of Stevenson. The film Canary Black (2024), which features Stevenson, is also dedicated to him.

== Filmography ==
=== Film ===
Year	Title	Role	Notes	Ref.
1998	The Theory of Flight	Gigolo		
1999	G:MT – Greenwich Mean Time	Mr. Hardy		
2002	No Man's Land		Short film	
2004	King Arthur	Dagonet		
2008	Outpost	D.C.		
2008	Punisher: War Zone	Frank Castle / Punisher		
2009	Cirque du Freak: The Vampire's Assistant	Murlough		
2010	The Book of Eli	Redridge		
2010	The Other Guys	Roger Wesley		
2011	Kill the Irishman	Danny Greene		
2011	Thor	Volstagg		
2011	The Three Musketeers	Porthos		
2013	G.I. Joe: Retaliation	Firefly		
2013	Jayne Mansfield's Car	Phillip Bedford		
2013	Thor: The Dark World	Volstagg		
2014	Divergent	Marcus Eaton		
2014	Big Game	Morris		
2015	The Divergent Series: Insurgent	Marcus Eaton		
2015	The Transporter: Refueled	Frank Martin Sr.		
2016	The Divergent Series: Allegiant	Marcus Eaton		
2017	Thor: Ragnarok	Volstagg		
2017	Cold Skin	Gruner		
2018	Accident Man	Ray "Big Ray"		
2018	Final Score	Arkady Belav		
2022	RRR	Governor Scott Buxton	Indian Telugu-language film	
2022	Memory	Detective Danny Mora		
2022	Accident Man: Hitman's Holiday	Ray "Big Ray"		
2024	Canary Black	Jarvis Hedlund	Posthumous release	
2025	1242: Gateway to the West	Cesareane	Posthumous release	

=== Television ===
Year	Title	Role	Notes	Ref.
1993	A Woman's Guide to Adultery	Journalist		
1994	The Dwelling Place	Matthew Whitwell	3 episodes	
1994	The Return of the Native	Clym Yeobright	Television film	
1995	Band of Gold	Steve Dickson	12 episodes	
1995	Some Kind of Life	Steve	Television film	
1996	The Tide of Life	Larry Birch	3 episodes	
1997	Peak Practice	Joe Higson	Episode: "Home Truths"	
1997	Drover's Gold	Armstrong	5 episodes	
1998	City Central	Detective Inspector Tony Baynham	32 episodes	
1999	Love in the 21st Century	Alex	Episode: "Toyboys"	
2000	Holby City	Laurence Haney	Episode: "Taking It on the Chin"	
2000	The Bill	Sergeant Gartland	Episode: "Over the Edge"	
2001	At Home with the Braithwaites	Graham Braithwaite	11 episodes	
2001	Dalziel and Pascoe	Jeff Parry	Episode: "Truth and Consequences"	
2003	Red Cap	Sergeant Chris Roxborough	Episode: "Cover Story"	
2003	Murphy's Law	Robert Eaglan	Episode: "Kiss and Tell"	
2004	Waking the Dead	Dr. Tim Faulkner	Episode: "Fugue States"	
2005–2007	Rome	Titus Pullo	22 episodes	
2007	Life Line	Peter Brasco	Television film	
2009	The Super Hero Squad Show	Frank Castle / Punisher	Voice, Episode: "Night in the Sanctorum!"	
2012	Dexter	Isaak "Volk" Sirko	9 episodes Nominated – Saturn Award for Best Guest Starring Role on Television	
2014	Crossing Lines	Miles Lennon	4 episodes	
2015	Saints & Strangers	Stephen Hopkins	Miniseries	
2016–2017	Black Sails	Edward Teach / Blackbeard	11 episodes	
2016–2017	Star Wars Rebels	Gar Saxon	Voice, 2 episodes	
2017	Rellik	Detective Sergeant Inspector Edward Benton	6 episodes	
2019	Reef Break	Jake Elliot	13 episodes	
2019	Medici	Ferdinand I of Naples	2 episodes	
2020	The Spanish Princess	James IV	2 episodes	
2020	Vikings	Ohthere of Hålogaland	11 episodes	
2020	Star Wars: The Clone Wars	Gar Saxon	Voice, 2 episodes	
2022	Das Boot	Commander Jack Swinburne	8 episodes	
2023	Ahsoka	Baylan Skoll	Main role, 8 episodes; posthumous release	

=== Stage ===
Year	Title	Role	Notes	Ref.
2000	York Mystery Plays	Christ		
2001	Mouth to Mouth	Roger		
2003	The Duchess of Malfi	The Cardinal		
