= No Return (British TV series) =

British television drama

- Genre: Drama
- Created by: Danny Brocklehurst
- Written by: Danny Brocklehurst
- Directed by: John Alexander
- Starring: Sheridan Smith
- Composer: Adrian Johnston
- Country of origin: United Kingdom
- Original language: English
- No. of series: 1
- No. of episodes: 4

Production
- Executive producers: John Alexander; Danny Brocklehurst; Richard Fee; Nicola Shindler
- Producer: Farah Abushwesha
- Running time: 60 mins.
- Production company: Red Production Company

Original release
- Network: ITV1
- Release: 7 February – 28 February 2022

No Return is a four-part British television drama, written by Danny Brocklehurst. It stars Sheridan Smith as a mother whose son is accused of sexual assault, while on holiday. It aired on ITV from 7 February to 28 February 2022.

== Synopsis ==
Kathy and Martin, along with their son Noah, go on a family holiday in Turkey. However, after Noah is invited to a beach party, he is arrested for sexual assault and his parents are thrown into a world of turmoil and unfamiliar legal systems.

== Cast ==
- Sheridan Smith as Kathy Powell
- Michael Jibson as Martin Powell
- Louis Ashbourne Serkis as Noah Powell
- Siân Brooke as Megan McGee
- David Mumeni as Steve McGee
- Lily Sutcliffe as Jessica Powell
- Jack Chorley as Fred McGee
- Jodie Campbell as Rosie
- Philip Arditti as Rico Karvalci
- Murat Seven as Ismail
- Rufus Hound as Al Milner
- Cosh Omar as Judge Ersoy

== Episodes ==
No.	Title	Directed by	Written by	Original release date	UK viewers (millions)
1	"Episode 1"	John Alexander	Danny Brocklehurst	7 February 2022	N/A
2	"Episode 2"	John Alexander	Danny Brocklehurst	14 February 2022	N/A
3	"Episode 3"	John Alexander	Danny Brocklehurst	21 February 2022	N/A
4	"Episode 4"	John Alexander	Danny Brocklehurst	28 February 2022	N/A

== Reception ==
Anita Singh of The Daily Telegraph gave it three out of five stars. Carol Midgley of The Times gave it three out five stars. Nick Hilton of The Independent also gave it three out five stars.
