= Grenfell (TV series) =

Upcoming three-part BBC television series

- Written by: Peter Kosminsky
- Directed by: Peter Kosminsky
- Country of origin: United Kingdom
- Original language: English
- No. of series: 1
- No. of episodes: 3

Production
- Executive producers: Mark Pybus; Lucy Richer
- Producer: Ahmed Peerbux
- Production company: The Forge

Original release
- Network: BBC One

Grenfell is an upcoming three-part factual drama television series for the BBC telling the story of the events surrounding the Grenfell Tower fire, which took place in June 2017.

The series will tell the story of events before, during and after the fire, and be presented from several perspectives.

== Production ==
=== Development ===
Details of the series were announced on 13 February 2023, when it was confirmed the series would be written and directed by Peter Kosminsky, who had previously directed the television series The Undeclared War, Wolf Hall and the film White Oleander.

The series was announced following five years of research carried out by Kosminsky, who spoke to those involved in the tragedy, as well as consulting public sources and documents from the public inquiry into the fire.

On 15 February 2023, Deadline reported the series would be unlikely to appear for at least a year as Kosminsky planned to wait for the conclusion of the inquiry before starting work on scripts. This was because he wanted to include the reaction to the inquiry's findings in the drama. The inquiry formally concluded on 10 February 2025.
