= Jeremy Neumark Jones =

British actor

- Born: Jeremy Barrington Neumark Jones; 1989 (age 35–36); Enfield, Greater London
- Occupation: Actor
- Years active: 2012–present

Jeremy Barrington Neumark Jones (born 1989 in Enfield) is an English actor who has taken lead roles on the BBC television series The Last Post (2017) and on the ITV drama series Belgravia (2020).

His grandparents were German Jews who moved to England because of the Nazi regime. In 2020, he took up German citizenship.

== Career ==
=== Film ===
Year	Title	Role	Notes
2017	Damascene	Male Hipster	
2020	Sulphur and White	Jamie	
2025	The World Will Tremble	Michael Podchlebnik	
TBA	1242: Gateway to the West	Eusebius	

=== Television ===
Year	Title	Role	Notes
2016	Siblings	Dylan	TV series
2017	The Last Post	Captain Joe Martin	TV series
2019	The Feed	Ben Hatfield	TV series
2020	Belgravia	Lord Edmund Bellasis	TV series
