= Canary Black =

2024 action spy film by Pierre Morel

- Release poster
- Directed by: Pierre Morel
- Written by: Matthew Kennedy
- Produced by: Sébastien Raybaud; John Zois; Carsten Lorenz; Renee Tab; Christopher Tuffin; Jeff Elliott; Marina Grasic
- Starring: Kate Beckinsale; Rupert Friend; Ray Stevenson; Saffron Burrows
- Cinematography: Thierry Arbogast
- Edited by: Tania Goding
- Music by: Jessica Rose Weiss
- Production companies: Anton; Sentient Entertainment; Brickell & Broadbridge International; Oakhurst Entertainment
- Distributed by: Amazon MGM Studios
- Release date: October 24, 2024
- Running time: 101 minutes
- Countries: United Kingdom; United States
- Language: English

Canary Black is a 2024 action-thriller film directed by Pierre Morel and written by Matthew Kennedy. The film stars Kate Beckinsale as a CIA agent who is blackmailed into undertaking missions in exchange for her kidnapped husband's life. It was released on October 24, 2024 by Amazon MGM Studios to generally negative reviews.

== Plot ==
During a mission, CIA agent Avery Graves steals a thumbdrive and kills Japanese arms supplier Kenji in Tokyo, who is using a business façade to ship arms to terrorists. Avery had been assigned to investigate Kali, a mysterious assassin who kills arms dealers and drug runners. She comes home to find her husband David missing. Croatian cyberterrorist Breznov then calls Avery to blackmail her into getting him "Canary Black" – a file hidden in the fake tooth of Laszlo Stoica, a man currently detained at the CIA Black Site for espionage – in exchange for David's life. At the Black Site, Avery pulls out Stoica's tooth, but there is no file in it. She escapes, and is now on the wanted list.

She meets with her boss Jarvis Hedlund in his car to talk about Canary Black. He eventually traps Avery, and the CIA captures her. But their convoy is ambushed by masked men who attach explosive devices to two of the vehicles. Avery escapes, after the car she is being transported in crashes and overturns. A masked man follows her into an alley, where she stabs him. She removes his mask and discovers that he is her neighbor Niklaus, whose real name is Rurik van Klaus, an Austrian private contractor. He dies before saying anything about David's whereabouts.

Meanwhile, Deputy Director Nathan Evans meets Breznov in his official pretended capacity as head of security services. Avery ties up Evans in his hotel room and tortures him to obtain the password of his agency mainframe account. After she finds it blocked, she enlists her hacker friend Sorina to gain access to a CIA server inside a defence contractor company building. Aided by Sorina's human-transport-capable quadricopter drone, Avery gets on the building's rooftop. There, Avery copies the Canary Black file. After escaping from the building, involving a drone crash, she brings the file to Sorina, who analyses it and discovers that Canary Black is a virus that will cause computer systems to stop, end all internet usage, and cause stock markets to crash globally. Avery takes Sorina's phone and texts Jarvis, telling him to track the phone's location. Avery then drives in a car she previously hijacked, to an agreed-upon payphone where she answers Breznov's call and confirms that she obtained the file prior to a midnight ultimatum. However, one of his henchmen, posing as a homeless man, tases her and injects her with something. She is then brought to Breznov's cyber HQ in an abandoned Cold War-era subterranean complex, where she is chained up.

Breznov broadcasts a video to the Global Unification Summit about his access to Canary Black. He requests a ransom of 1% of GDP of every country, roughly a trillion dollars. As an example, he targets Singapore, cutting off all power there. Jarvis tracks Sorina's phone carried by Avery, locates the hideout and kills the entrance guards; but he is captured by Breznov, who kills him. As Avery is hanging on chains, David is shot with a flesh wound to the abdomen, so that he bleeds out slowly. After Breznov leaves the room, Avery attacks Breznov's vengeful female henchman, Rurik's partner. David grabs a knife, kills two henchmen and reveals to Avery that he is Kali, that he had been lying to her throughout their marriage and that it was he who informed Breznov about Canary Black's existence.

As the ransom money starts pouring in, David kills the power to stop transmitting the virus. In the ensuing struggle, Avery kills Breznov and stops the virus from uploading. Avery returns her engagement ring to David, saying that their marriage is beyond fixing. As the CIA arrives, David jumps into the river and Avery is arrested. While she is in custody, Evans taunts Avery, telling her that David is dead. Elizabeth Mills arrives, and offers Avery a job in exchange for avoiding jail time, at MC6: an organization that takes on critical missions on the highest scale of threat. Walking outside, Avery sees her ring on a handrail, indicating that David is still alive.

== Cast ==
- Kate Beckinsale as Avery Graves
- Rupert Friend as David Brooks
- Ray Stevenson as Jarvis Hedlund
- Saffron Burrows as Elizabeth Mills
- Ben Miles as DCIA Nathan Evans
- Goran Kostić as Konrad Breznov
- Masayoshi Haneda as Kenji Nakajima
- Michael Brandon as the President of the United States
- Charles Nishikawa as Japanese Prime Minister

== Production ==
Canary Black was first introduced at the 2022 Cannes Film Market as a spy thriller directed by Pierre Morel, written by Matthew Kennedy, and starring Kate Beckinsale. At the American Film Market later that year, the first images of the production were released as Anton put the film up for sale.

Filming began in Croatia in October 2022, and continued through January 2023. Filming took place primarily in Zagreb, where shooting interrupted service for several trams in Zagreb to control the environment of the outdoor action sequences, which included Beckinsale flying over the city from a drone and hanging from rooftops. Filming in Zagreb utilized the Dinamo Zagreb's Stadion Maksimir as a movie set, and the city of Rovinj doubled for Tokyo.

The end scene was filmed in Ljubljana (Slovenia) at the Triple bridge.

The film is dedicated to Ray Stevenson, who died a year before it was released.

== Release ==
Canary Black was released on Prime Video on October 24, 2024.

== Reception ==
On the review aggregator website Rotten Tomatoes, 18% of 11 critics' reviews are positive, with an average rating of 4.3/10.
