= The Theory of Flight =

- Theatrical release poster
- Directed by: Paul Greengrass
- Written by: Richard Hawkins
- Produced by: Ruth Caleb; Anant Singh; Helena Spring
- Starring: Helena Bonham Carter; Kenneth Branagh; Gemma Jones; Holly Aird; Ray Stevenson
- Cinematography: Ivan Strasburg
- Edited by: Mark Day
- Music by: Rolfe Kent
- Production companies: BBC Films; Distant Horizon
- Distributed by: Miramax International (United Kingdom and Ireland; through Buena Vista International); Summit Entertainment (International)
- Release date: 11 September 1998 (TIFF)
- Running time: 101 minutes
- Country: United Kingdom
- Language: English
- Box office: $73,233

The Theory of Flight is a 1998 British comedy drama directed by Paul Greengrass from a screenplay written by Richard Hawkins. It stars Helena Bonham Carter and Kenneth Branagh.

It premiered at the 23rd Toronto International Film Festival on 11 September 1998. Bonham Carter plays a woman with motor neurone disease, and the film deals with the sexuality of people with disabilities.

== Plot ==
Richard, an unsuccessful artist who builds primitive flying machines, attempts to fly from the roof of a London office building wearing homemade wings but fails, instead crash-landing and only being saved by a rescue squad. As a result of his actions Richard is sentenced to community service, in the form of caring for Jane, an ill-tempered woman who has amyotrophic lateral sclerosis and has driven away her previous carers.

Over time, Richard and Jane become friends, and eventually Jane asks Richard to help her find someone to lose her virginity to, explaining that she does not want to die a virgin. Reluctantly Richard helps her search for an appropriate partner, while spending his free time building yet another experimental flying machine. Eventually the two settle on a high-priced male gigolo for Jane, who agrees to sleep with her for two thousand pounds. As neither of them has that amount of money, they conclude that Richard must rob a bank to secure the needed cash.

Richard books a hotel suite for Jane and pays the gigolo five hundred pounds, promising the rest later. As Richard leaves for the bank job, the gigolo lays a very nervous Jane on the bed, but she begins panicking and decides she no longer wants to go through with it. Meanwhile, Richard likewise changes his mind, drawing his gun in the bank but then fleeing immediately, calling Jane's name. He returns to the room and drives off the unhappy gigolo.

Richard and Jane are seen successfully taking a flight in Richard's flying machine, although it breaks apart on landing. The pair are then seen in bed, implying that they have slept together. Jane dies soon after, and the film ends with Richard placing a commemorative sign honouring Jane's memory on the wreckage of his flying machine.

== Cast ==
- Helena Bonham Carter as Jane Hatchard
- Kenneth Branagh as Richard
- Gemma Jones as Anne
- Holly Aird as Julie
- Ray Stevenson as Gigolo
- Ruth Jones as Becky

== Reception ==
On the review aggregator website Rotten Tomatoes, 48% of 21 critics' reviews are positive. Metacritic, which uses a weighted average, assigned the film a score of 48 out of 100, based on 15 critics, indicating "mixed or average" reviews.

It was the last film reviewed on-air by film critic Gene Siskel on Siskel and Ebert at the Movies before his death on 20 February 1999. Siskel gave the film a thumbs up, while his critic partner Roger Ebert gave the film a thumbs down. In his review for the Chicago Sun-Times, Ebert gave the film 2.5 out of 4 stars, and wrote that it "is actually fairly enjoyable. At least it doesn't drown its message in syrup and cornball sentiment, like Patch Adams. It has a lot of refreshing humor. But then, when you see the real thing, when you see Dance Me to My Song, you're struck by the difference. Two movies. Same story. Same objective. Similar characters. Similar situation. One is an entertainment. The other is a thunderbolt."
