= Gateway to the Southwest =

Gateway to the Southwest may refer to:

- Yuma, Arizona
- Fulton, Arkansas
- Shamrock, Texas
- Texarkana, Texas

== See also ==
- Gateway to the West
