= Jodie Campbell (actress) =

English actress (born 2003)

- Born: Jodie Rhona Campbell; 17 September 2003 (age 23)
- Years active: 2018–present

Jodie Rhona Campbell (born 17 September 2003) is an English actress. She began her career as a teenager in the Sky One series Bulletproof (2018–2021). She has since starred in the BBC Three series Boarders (2024–2026).

== Career ==
Campbell made her television debut in 2018 when she began playing Ali Pike in the Sky One police procedural Bulletproof. She appeared in the 2022 ITV One miniseries No Return as Rosie.

In 2024, Campbell began starring as Leah Dulverton in the BBC Three teen comedy-drama Boarders. In her review of series 1, Leila Latif of the The Guardian highlighted Campbell's performance as "particularly strong".

Campbell made her professional stage debut in B*tch Boxer, which premiered in 2025 at the Watford Palace Theatre before having a run at East London's Arcola Theatre in 2026. Campbell has an upcoming role in the BBC One legal drama Reputation.

== Filmography ==
Year	Title	Role	Notes
2018–2021	Ali Pike	Bulletproof	11 episodes
2022	No Return	Rosie	Miniseries, 3 episodes
2024–2026	Boarders	Leah Dulverton	Main role
TBA	Reputation		
