= Hillsborough (1996 film) =

1996 British drama television film by Charles McDougall

- Genre: Docudrama
- Written by: Jimmy McGovern
- Directed by: Charles McDougall
- Starring: Annabelle Apsion; Joe Duttine; Christopher Eccleston; Bruce Jones; Andrew Lancel; Maurice Roëves; Ricky Tomlinson; Stephen Walters; Tracey Wilkinson; Scot Williams; Mark Womack
- Theme music composer: Rob Lane
- Country of origin: United Kingdom
- Original language: English

Production
- Executive producers: Ian McBride; Gub Neal
- Producer: Nicola Shindler
- Cinematography: Barry Ackroyd
- Running time: 101 minutes
- Production company: Granada Television
- Budget: £2 million

Original release
- Network: ITV
- Release: 5 December 1996

Hillsborough is a television film written by Jimmy McGovern and starring Annabelle Apsion, Christopher Eccleston and Ricky Tomlinson. Set between 1989 and 1991, the film is a dramatization of the Hillsborough disaster, which saw 97 football supporters lose their lives at Hillsborough in Sheffield. The film won the BAFTA TV Award for Best Single Drama.

== Background ==
In April 1989, Liverpool and Nottingham Forest met in the semi-finals of the FA Cup. The match was played at Hillsborough Stadium in Sheffield but was abandoned 7 minutes after the match had started when it became clear that the fans packed in to the Leppings Lane end of the ground were being crushed against fencing. 94 fans died that day, with a 95th victim dying a few days later, the 96th victim dying in 1993, and the final death toll reaching 97 in 2021.

== Production ==
In 1995, two women who had lost children in the disaster asked McGovern if he would write their story. He began by interviewing the families of the victims and became so angry at the unfolding story that he brought in writer Katy Jones to verify that his writing was not skewed in any way.

The film was produced by Granada Television for ITV and aired for the first time on 5 December 1996. Since then, it has been repeated four times: 10 years after the disaster (15 April 1999), 20 years after the disaster (17 April 2009), on 14 September 2012 after the report by the Hillsborough Independent Panel was published, and on 1 May 2016 after the conclusion of the second inquest, which ruled that the then-96 victims were unlawfully killed.

Though filmed after the death of Tony Bland, who died in March 1993 after being in a coma for nearly four years, the time setting of the film concluded in 1991 when the death toll stood at 95.

== Cast ==
- Christopher Eccleston as Trevor Hicks
- Annabelle Apsion as Jenni Hicks
- Sarah Graham as Sarah Hicks
- Anna Martland as Victoria "Vicki" Hicks
- Ricky Tomlinson as John Glover
- Rachel Davies as Teresa Glover
- Scot Williams as Joe Glover
- Stephen Walters as Ian Glover
- Mark Womack as Eddie Spearritt
- Tracey Wilkinson as Jan Spearritt
- Kevin Knapman as Adam Spearritt
- Ian McDiarmid as Dr Popper, the coroner
- Maurice Roëves as Chief Superintendent Duckenfield
- Bruce Jones as Video Technician
- Joe Duttine as Policeman
- Jack Deam as Policeman

== Reception ==
The film was generally well received by the public and television critics. The Independent Television Commission praised Granada for the drama in its annual programme review, describing it as "arguably the most powerful drama on the screen in 1996." It won the BAFTA Television Award in 1997 for Best Single Drama, Best Editing and Best Sound. In 2000, the British Film Industry placed Hillsborough at number 54 in its list of the 100 Greatest British Television Programmes.

== Home media ==
Five months after the twentieth anniversary of the tragedy, on 7 September 2009, the Hillsborough docu-drama was released on DVD.
