= Justin Brady =

British actor

Justin Brady is a British actor who is best known for playing Billy in The Lakes, James Dewar in Peak Practice, and a paramedic in Holby City. He has also guest starred in Shameless.
