= Annabelle Apsion =

English actress

- Born: Jane Annabelle Apsion; 17 September 1960 (age 65); Hammersmith, London, England
- Occupation: Actress
- Years active: 1987–present

Jane Annabelle Apsion (born 17 September 1960 in Hammersmith, London) is an English actress best known for playing Monica Gallagher in the television comedy drama Shameless (2004–2013), Joy Wilton in Soldier Soldier (1991–1995), and Violet Buckle in Call the Midwife (2015–present).

== Career ==
Apart from Shameless, Apsion is also known for her portrayals of Betty in My Good Friend, Beverly in The Lakes, Patricia Hillman in Coronation Street, and Mrs. Beech in Michelle Magorian's Goodnight Mister Tom. She has appeared in two separate episodes of Midsomer Murders, Death in Chorus and Dead Man's 11, as two different characters. She played Jenni Hicks, whose two daughters died at the 1989 Hillsborough disaster, in the docudrama Hillsborough, which aired in 1996. She has since featured in an episode of Lewis (2010), and played a small role in the first episode of the sitcom In with the Flynns. She appeared alongside her Shameless co-star Maxine Peake in the BBC series The Village (2013-2014).

In 2001, she starred as Polly Nichols, the first known victim of Jack the Ripper, alongside Johnny Depp, Heather Graham, and Robbie Coltrane in From Hell (2001). She appeared in About a Boy (2002), The War Zone (1999), Lolita (1997), This Year's Love (1999), and Ironclad (2011).

Apsion starred as Monica Gallagher between 2004 and 2006, in Shameless. She left the show in 2008, with her final scenes airing in March 2009 during the sixth series. She briefly returned to the role in 2011 during the eighth series and for the eleventh and final series in 2013.

Outside of acting, she has appeared as a guest panellist on Five's The Wright Stuff during 2008 and 2009.

In 2014, Apsion portrayed Annette Walker in an episode of the detective drama Suspects, and in episodes of Doc Martin as Jennifer Cardew. She has played Violet Buckle (née Gee), for 10 years in Call the Midwife (2015 to present).

In 2020, she played Beattie May in an episode of Father Brown.

== Personal life ==
Apsion is a former student of Godalming College, Surrey and the University of Wales. She is also co-founder and practitioner of the Rosen Method Bodywork in the UK, an alternative health practice which integrates mind and body.

== Filmography ==
=== Film ===
| Year | Title | Role | Notes |
|---|---|---|---|
| 1990 | The Widowmaker | Kathy | TV film |
| 1995 | Out of My Head | Miss Multi Personality | Direct-to-video |
| 1995 | Killing Me Softly | Billi | TV film |
| 1996 | Hillsborough | Jenni Hicks | TV film |
| 1997 | Lolita | Mrs. Leigh | |
| 1998 | Goodnight, Mister Tom | Mrs. Beech | TV film |
| 1999 | This Year's Love | Hostess | |
| 1999 | The War Zone | Nurse | |
| 2001 | From Hell | Polly Nichols | |
| 2002 | About a Boy | Amnesty International Worker | |
| 2002 | Tough Love | DI Karen Irving | TV film |
| 2002 | Darwin's Daughter | Emma Darwin | TV film |
| 2004 | Carrie's War | Older Carrie | TV film |
| 2004 | May 33rd | Jenny | TV film |
| 2004 | Lighthouse Hill | Honey | |
| 2004 | Frances Tuesday | Christy West | TV film |
| 2005 | Peace & Quiet | Mrs. Wooley | Short film |
| 2006 | Driving Lessons | Trendy Mum | |
| 2011 | Ironclad | Maddy | |
| 2018 | Torvill & Dean | Betty Calloway | TV film |

=== Television ===
| Year | Title | Role | Notes |
|---|---|---|---|
| 1988 | Emmerdale | Lucy Dowling | 2 episodes |
| 1990 | Casualty | Carrie Potter | Episode: "Say It with Flowers" |
| 1991 | Screen One | Marie | Episode: "Alive and Kicking" |
| 1991–1995 | Soldier Soldier | Joy Wilton | Series regular, 30 episodes |
| 1992 | Framed | Susan Jackson | Mini-series, 4 episodes |
| 1996 | My Good Friend | Betty | Series regular, 7 episodes |
| 1998 | Big Women | Alice | Mini-series, 4 episodes |
| 1998 | The Bill | Sarah Ryman | Episode: "Love's Labours Lost" |
| 1999 | Sunburn | Susan Armitage | Episode: "Series 1, Episode 4" |
| 1999 | The Lakes | Beverly Fisher | Recurring role, 8 episodes |
| 1999 | Midsomer Murders | Jane Cavendish | Episode: "Dead Man's Eleven" |
| 2000 | The Mrs Bradley Mysteries | Mona Bunting | Episode: "Death at the Opera" |
| 2000 | The Sleeper | Claire Moon | Mini-series |
| 2001 | My Uncle Silas | Queenie White | Episode: "The Wedding" |
| 2001–2002 | Micawber | Emma Micawber | Series regular, 4 episodes "Micawber Learns the Truth", "Micawber and the Theatre", "Micawber Meets the Americans", "Micawber and the Aristocracy" |
| 2002 | In Deep | Lianne | Episode: "Abuse of Trust" |
| 2002 | Helen West | Kim Perry | Episode: "Deep Sleep" |
| 2002 | Coronation Street | Patricia Hillman | 4 episodes |
| 2003 | The Second Coming | Fiona Morris | Mini-series, 2 episodes |
| 2003 | Spooks | Bridget Sands | Episode: "I Spy Apocalypse" |
| 2003 | Rockface | Jo | Episode: "Series 2, Episode 7" |
| 2003 | Silent Witness | Jayne Rooke | Episode: "Fatal Error" |
| 2003 | Foyle's War | Kate Farley | Episode: "The Funk Hole" |
| 2004 | Family Business | Mrs. Bartlett | Episode: "Series 1, Episode 4" |
| 2004 | Murder City | Celia Farrell | Episode: "Happy Families" |
| 2004 | Outlaws | Elaine Ross | Series regular, 12 episodes |
| 2004–2005 | The Bill | Margaret Barnes | Recurring role, 20 episodes |
| 2004–2013 | Shameless | Monica Gallagher | Series regular, 40 episodes |
| 2006 | Wild at Heart | Eileen Chapman | Episode: "Series 1, Episode 5" |
| 2006 | Midsomer Murders | Ellen Barker | Episode: "Death in Chorus" |
| 2009 | Hotel Babylon | Alexis Warren | Episode: "Series 4, Episode 6" |
| 2010 | Lewis | Babs Temple | Episode: "Dark Matter" |
| 2011 | In with the Flynns | Theresa | Episode: "Santorini" |
| 2011 | The Body Farm | Jo Fields | Episode: "Series 1, Episode 4" |
| 2011 | Moving On | Maggie | Episode: "Tour of Duty" |
| 2012 | A Mother's Son | Kay Mullary | Mini-series, 2 episodes |
| 2012 | Doctors | Mrs. Dallison | Episode: "Party Time" |
| 2012–2014 | Holby City | Jean Rimini | Recurring role, 3 episodes |
| 2013 | Doc Martin | Jennifer Cardew | Recurring role, 6 episodes |
| 2013–2014 | The Village | Margaret Boden | Series regular, 12 episodes |
| 2014 | Suspects | Annette Walker | Episode: "Hard Target" |
| 2015–present | Call the Midwife | Violet Buckle | Series regular, 46 episodes |
| 2017 | The Halcyon | Lillian Hobbs | Series regular, 8 episodes |
| 2019 | Treadstone | Bentley's Mother | Episode: "The Bentley Lament" |
| 2020 | Father Brown | Beattie May | Episode: "The Queen Bee" |

=== Theatre ===
| Year | Title | Role | Venue | Notes |
|---|---|---|---|---|
| 1987 | Camille | Marguerite | The Old Red Lion, London | |
| 1988 | The Bacchae | Bacchae | Lyric Theatre, London | with Shared Experience |
| 1989 | Heartbreak House | Ellie Dunn | Riverside Studios, London | with Shared Experience |
| 1989 | City Sugar | Nicola | The Brewhouse Theatre & Arts Centre, Taunton | with Century Theatre |
| 1989 | Abingdon Square | Marion | Soho Poly Theatre, London & Cottesloe Theatre, London | |
| 1992 | Anna Karenina | Anna Arkadyevna Karenina | Theatre Royal, Bath | also, UK tour |
| 1992 | Richard III | Lady Anne | Swan Theatre, Stratford-upon-Avon | with Royal Shakespeare Company |
| 1993 | A Handful of Dust | Lady Brenda | Theatre Royal, Bath | with Cambridge Theatre Company |
| 1994 | The Editing Process | Tamara Dell Fuego | Royal Court Theatre, London | |
| 1995 | The Blue Ball | Sylie/Gina | Cottesloe Theatre, London | |
| 1998 | Trade | Mam | Royal Court Theatre, London | |
| 1999 | Remember This? | Victoria | Lyttelton Theatre, London | |
| 2005 | The Seagull | Nikolayevna Arkadina | Bristol Old Vic, Bristol | |
| 2011 | A Streetcar Named Desire | Eunice | Liverpool Playhouse, Liverpool | |
