= Collateral (TV series) =

2018 British television series

- Genre: Drama; Thriller
- Screenplay by: David Hare
- Directed by: S. J. Clarkson
- Starring: Carey Mulligan; Nathaniel Martello-White; Jeany Spark; Nicola Walker; John Simm; Kim Medcalf; Billie Piper; Hayley Squires
- Music by: Ruth Barrett
- Country of origin: United Kingdom
- Original language: English
- No. of episodes: 4

Production
- Executive producers: Mark Pybus (The Forge); George S. J. Faber (The Forge); David Hare; S.J. Clarkson; Lucy Richer (BBC)
- Producer: Elizabeth Binns
- Cinematography: Balazs Bolygo
- Editors: Jamie Trevill; Sacha Szwarc
- Running time: 55—58 minutes
- Production company: The Forge

Original release
- Network: BBC Two; Netflix
- Release: 12 February – 5 March 2018

Collateral is a four-part British television drama serial produced by The Forge for the BBC, created and written by David Hare, and directed by S.J. Clarkson. The series stars Carey Mulligan as DI Kip Glaspie, who is assigned to investigate the shooting of a pizza delivery rider in inner-city south-west London. Nathaniel Martello-White stars as Glaspie's partner, DS Nathan Bilk. The cast also includes Jeany Spark, Nicola Walker, John Simm, and Billie Piper.

The series was first broadcast on BBC Two on 12 February 2018. Netflix co-financed the series and released it internationally on 9 March 2018.

== Synopsis ==
DI Kip Glaspie is assigned to investigate the shooting of a pizza delivery rider in inner-city south-west London. The ensuing story explores a complex web of characters who are all somehow connected with the story, which addresses attitudes to immigration, including the maltreatment of refugees and immigrants by both uncaring people-traffickers and indifferent state agencies alike.

== Cast ==
- Carey Mulligan as Detective Inspector Kip Glaspie
- John Simm as David Mars MP, Shadow Secretary of State for Transport
- Billie Piper as Karen Mars, Mars's ex-wife
- Nicola Walker as the Reverend Jane Oliver, a vicar in Mars's constituency
- Kae Alexander as Linh Xuan Huy, Oliver's girlfriend and principal witness of the murder of Abdullah Asif
- Nathaniel Martello-White as Detective Sergeant Nathan Bilk
- Ben Miles as Detective Superintendent Jack Haley, DI Glaspie's senior officer
- Vineeta Rishi as Detective Constable Rakhee Shah
- Rob Jarvis as Detective Constable Euan Johnson
- Nick Mohammed as Fuzz Gupta, the area forensic manager
- Hayley Squires as Laurie Stone, the manager of Regal Pizza
- Brian Vernel as Mikey Gowans, delivery rider at Regal Pizza
- Ahd Kamel as Fatima Asif, elder sister of murder victim, Abdullah Asif
- July Namir as Mona Asif, pregnant younger sister of murder victim, Abdullah Asif
- Jeany Spark as Captain Sandrine Shaw, in the Royal Artillery of the British Army
- Robert Portal as Major Tim Dyson, Cpt. Shaw's senior officer
- Orla Brady as Phoebe Dyson, the wife of Maj. Dyson
- Adrian Lukis as Xan Schofield, a British Army psychiatrist
- Richard McCabe as Peter Westbourne, former Royal Artillery officer, best friend of Cpt. Shaw's father, leader of a human-trafficking ring
- Deborah Findlay as Eleanor Shaw, the widowed mother of Cpt. Shaw
- John Heffernan as Sam Spence, MI5 agent
- Maya Sansa as Berna Yalaz, undercover MI5 agent within the human-trafficking ring
- George Georgiou as Mehmet Akman, a human-trafficker and childhood friend of Yalaz
- Jacqueline Boatswain as Monique, the political office manager of David Mars
- Saskia Reeves as Deborah Clifford MP, Leader of the Opposition and of the Labour Party
- Kim Medcalf as Suki Vincent, a BBC News presenter and girlfriend of David Mars
- Vera Chok as Jill Leong, a television news reporter
- Nicola Duffett as Alice Stone, Laurie Stone's disabled mother

== Production ==
The series was produced by The Forge for the BBC, created and written by playwright David Hare, and directed by S.J. Clarkson. The series was Hare's first original series for television, despite having written for the BBC since 1973. He described the series as "a police procedural without any of that police attitudinising".

Piers Wenger, the BBC's head of drama, described the series as "a contemporary and thought-provoking state-of-the-nation thriller that pushes the boundaries of what audiences expect".

== Episodes ==
No.	Title	Directed by	Written by	Original release date	UK viewers (millions)
1	Episode 1	S. J. Clarkson	David Hare	12 February 2018	6.35
Abdullah Asif, a delivery rider at Regal Pizza, is gunned down on the street by a hooded, masked shooter in a southwest London suburb after delivering a pizza to Karen Mars, the ex-wife of the Shadow Minister for Transport David Mars, MP. Newly promoted, DI Kip Glaspie and DS Nathan Bilk are assigned to investigate the case. Glaspie questions the motives of Regal Pizza's manager Laurie Stone, after discovering that Asif was never meant to deliver Karen's pizza, but was sent by Stone in place of Asif's colleague Mikey Gowens. The key witness to the shooting, Linh Xuan Huy, recovering in the street from a night's clubbing, gives the police a false name and address, as she is carrying recreational drugs and having outstayed her visa to remain in the UK. Asif's sisters Fatima and Mona − who are also human-trafficked refugees/immigrants — are soon found, living in a local lock-up garage, by the police and pulled in for questioning. The assassin changes outfit in a public toilet and is revealed to be a woman.
2	Episode 2	S. J. Clarkson	David Hare	19 February 2018	5.47
Asif's sisters are removed to Harlsfleet immigration detention centre for unauthorised arrivals without the police's notice. Glaspie and Bilk go over to Essex to question the sisters in the hope they will shed some light on the case. However, MI5 officer Sam Spence's interest in the pair and dismissive attitude to the police sparks Glaspie's interest and suggests to her that there is much more to Asif's shooting than initially meets the eye. Bilk and DC Rakhee Shah uncover Stone and Gowens's drug-dealing operation via the pizza deliveries and arrest the latter. The assassin Royal Artillery Captain Sandrine Shaw faces sexual harassment from her commanding officer, Major Tim Dyson, while also being counselled for post-traumatic stress from her last tour of duty where a close fellow officer was killed. Stone is deeply disturbed in discovering her role in Asif's murder and goes to her local church for solace, where Rev. Oliver finds and counsels her. As she returns home, Stone is abducted in a van. Dyson blackmails Shaw into having sex.
3	Episode 3	S. J. Clarkson	David Hare	26 February 2018	5.25
After Stone is found dead in a messy body-dumping on rough ground from a van, Glaspie re-interviews Fatima alone. Bilk, tired of Glaspie's methods, goes behind her back with Spence in an attempt to make progress on the case. Spence is revealed to be working with Berna Yalaz, an undercover agent in a human-trafficking ring run by Peter Westbourne, a former army officer and best friend of Shaw's deceased officer father. Shaw wanted to kill a terrorist, so Westbourne tricked her into killing Asif, who had proof of the trafficking. Mars comes under scrutiny after making a political gaffe holding a press briefing where he describes Britain as "a nasty little country" in its hypocritical treatment of refugees. His day gets worse after uncovering evidence of Karen's regular use of cannabis and her stealing her au pair's wages. Rev. Oliver receives a visit from her gay bishop in a covert relationship, who hypocritically orders her to either cut her open lesbian relationship or leave the parish.
4	Episode 4	S. J. Clarkson	David Hare	5 March 2018	4.91
While armed, Shaw buttonholes Dyson's wife at home in to reveal his history of sexual harassment and rape. Mars eventually faces the music with the Leader of the Opposition, Deborah Clifford, being called into her office in the early hours for a severe reprimand. He calls her out over the disgraceful treatment of refugees, which she brushes off as the hypocrisy is due to the electorate's dislike of immigration. Bilk continues to leak information to Spence in an attempt to get back at Glaspie. After offering, without authority, Asif's sisters leave to remain in the UK in exchange for information, Glaspie is severely berated by Superintendent Jack Haley. The police raid the hotel at which the Asif sisters worked illegally and find Fatima's mobile phone. Securing the arrest of the three Turkish human traffickers, including Yalaz, Glaspie uses her as a bargaining tool to crack the case wide open and finally pursue those responsible for Asif's murder.

== Broadcast ==
The series was first broadcast on BBC Two on 12 February 2018 and was distributed worldwide via All3Media, which brought Netflix on board to co-finance the series and release it internationally on 9 March 2018.

Dazzler Media released a DVD of the series on 26 March 2018.

== Critical reception ==
On the review aggregator website Rotten Tomatoes, 79% of 42 critics' reviews are positive, with an average rating of 6.4/10. The website's consensus reads: "Collateral's social commentary is sometimes overbearing, but strong performances cut through an overcrowded script to suggest that good intentions can count for something." Metacritic, which uses a weighted average, assigned the series a score of 74 out of 100, based on 6 critics, indicating "generally favorable" reviews.

Hindustan Times called it "an addictive murder mystery", while Firstpost said it "manages to ask important questions but doesn't provide any answers".

== Accolades ==
In March 2019, Collateral received two nominations at the 2019 British Academy Television Awards in "Best Photography & Lighting: Fiction" and "British Academy Television Award for Best Supporting Actress" for Billie Piper.

Year	Award	Category	Nominee(s)	Result	Ref.
2019	British Academy Television Awards	Best Supporting Actress	Billie Piper	Nominated	
2019	British Academy Television Craft Awards	Photography & Lighting – Fiction	Balazs Bolygo	Nominated	
