= Reputation (TV series) =

British television series

- Genre: Legal drama
- Created by: Anya Reiss
- Written by: Anya Reiss; Shyam Popat; Karla Crome
- Directed by: Mahalia Belo
- Starring: Naomie Harris; Christina Hendricks; Alex Jennings; David Gyasi; Emily Atack; Kyle Soller
- Country of origin: United Kingdom
- Original language: English
- No. of series: 1
- No. of episodes: 6

Production
- Executive producers: George Ormond; Jade Taylor; Anya Reiss; Mahalia Belo
- Producer: Alex Kazamia
- Production company: The Forge

Original release
- Network: BBC One

Reputation is an upcoming British legal drama television series. It is created and written by Anya Reiss for BBC One.

The cast is led by Naomie Harris and Christina Hendricks.

== Premise ==
The six-part series centres on Lena, a formidable lawyer who has built her career defending free expression who gets pulled into the case of the decade representing global pop star Davina Knight.

After Davina releases a provocative new song accusing her ex-husband, Billy, of abusive behaviour and he retaliates in kind, their private breakdown erupts into a very public libel battle.

== Cast ==
- Naomie Harris as Lena
- Christina Hendricks as Davina Knight
- Alex Jennings
- David Gyasi
- Kyle Soller as Billy
- Emily Atack
- Marli Siu
- Alex Heath
- Tilly Keeper
- Corey Johnson
- Aidan McArdle
- Ernest Kingsley Jnr
- Jodie Campbell
- Kayla Meikle
- Mike Noble
- Enzo Cilenti
- Kat Ronney

== Production ==
=== Development ===
Reputation was commissioned by Lindsay Salt, Director of BBC Drama, in May 2026 and the series is being produced by UK production company The Forge. It is created by Anya Reiss, with Mahalia Belo serving as the director. Other writers of the series are Shyam Popat and Karla Crome. Alongside Reiss and Belo, George Ormond and Jade Taylor serve as executive producers.

=== Casting ===
The BBC confirmed that the cast will be led by Naomie Harris as Lena, the formidable lawyer, and Christina Hendricks as Davina Knight, the global pop star Lena represents. Additional cast include Alex Jennings, David Gyasi, Emily Atack, Kyle Soller, Marli Siu, Alex Heath, Tilly Keeper, Corey Johnson, Aidan McArdle, Ernest Kingsley Jnr, Jodie Campbell, Kayla Meikle, Mike Noble, Enzo Cilenti and Kat Ronney.

=== Filming ===
Filming was confirmed to be underway as of 22 May 2026.
