= National Treasure (British TV series) =

British television drama

- Genre: Drama
- Based on: Operation Yewtree
- Written by: Jack Thorne
- Directed by: Marc Munden
- Starring: Robbie Coltrane; Julie Walters; Tim McInnerny; Andrea Riseborough
- Composer: Cristobal Tapia de Veer
- Country of origin: United Kingdom
- Original language: English
- No. of series: 1
- No. of episodes: 4

Production
- Executive producers: George Ormond; George Faber; Jack Thorne; Marc Munden; Hugo Heppell; Norman Merry
- Producer: John Chapman
- Production locations: Sheffield; Kingston upon Hull; Darrington, West Yorkshire
- Production company: The Forge

Original release
- Network: Channel 4
- Release: 20 September – 11 October 2016

National Treasure is a four-part 2016 British television drama by Channel 4, written by Jack Thorne. It stars Robbie Coltrane as Paul Finchley, a once successful comedian of the 1980s and early 1990s, now hosting a television quiz show. He is accused of raping several young women in the early 1990s. Julie Walters plays his wife Marie and Andrea Riseborough plays his daughter Dee.

The drama is inspired by Operation Yewtree, a police operation that resulted in the prosecution of a number of veteran TV performers. At the 2017 British Academy Television Awards, the series won Best Mini-Series while Coltrane was nominated for Best Actor.

== Cast ==
- Robbie Coltrane as Paul Finchley
  - Trystan Gravelle as Young Paul
- Julie Walters as Marie Finchley, Finchley's wife
  - Lucy Speed as Young Marie
- Andrea Riseborough as Danielle "Dee" Finchley, Finchley's daughter
  - Cara Barton as Young Dee
- Tim McInnerny as Sir Karl Jenkins, Finchley's former comedy partner, now a major star
  - Ed Eales White as Young Karl
- Babou Ceesay as Jerome Sharpe, Finchley's solicitor
- Mark Lewis Jones as Gerry, investigator
- Nadine Marshall as DI Palmer
- Kate Hardie as Rebecca Thornton, alleged rape victim
  - Sarah Middleton as Young Rebecca
- Susan Lynch as Christina Farnborough, former babysitter
  - Ruby Ashbourne Serkis as Young Christina
- Graeme Hawley as Dan
- William Wright-Neblett as Billy, Dee's son
- Kerry Fox as Zoe Darwin, Finchley's barrister
- Renaee-Mya Warden as Frances
- Jeremy Swift as Simon
- Rosalind Eleazar as Georgina, a prostitute
- Vivienne Bell as Stella
- David Fleeshman as Judge
- Sam Hoare as Tom
- Ben Lloyd-Hughes as Freddie
- Ronnie Fox as Taxi Driver
- Vicki Hackett as Receptionist
- Ian Puleston-Davies as Leo
- Johann Myers as Dave
- Catherine Breeze as Nurse
- Darren Boyd as Hamish
- Lee Mack as Himself
- Robert Webb as Himself
- Alan Carr as Himself
- Frank Skinner as Himself
- Victoria Derbyshire as Herself

== Plot ==
No.	Episode	Directed by	Written by	Original release date	Viewers (millions) (Note: 28-day consolidated, including C4+1.)
1	"Episode 1"	Marc Munden	Jack Thorne	20 September 2016	5.39
After an awards ceremony, veteran comedian Paul Finchley is arrested on suspicion of raping Rebecca Thornton in 1993. The police also find pictures of him with other women. His Catholic wife, Marie, is horrified and his daughter Dee, a recovering drug addict, cannot take it in. Paul's life goes into a downward spiral as he is dropped from his presenting duties and to make matters worse, he faces more charges as more women come forward, including a former babysitter who was 15 years old at the time.
2	"Episode 2"	Marc Munden	Jack Thorne	27 September 2016	4.31
Dee begins to wonder if her father, Paul, was abusing her as a child. She attempts to confront her former babysitter, Christina, who has formally accused Paul. Flashback sequences show that Christina introduced Dee to cigarettes one night when Paul and Marie were out. Paul returned without Marie and Christina suggested that they have a drink. It is implied that he put her in a taxi instead. On deciding that Paul is innocent, Dee crashes her car into Christina’s house and writes “I choose to believe too” on one of the tabloid stories, ending up in a coma.
3	"Episode 3"	Marc Munden	Jack Thorne	4 October 2016	3.94
Marie is confronted by Rebecca in the ladies' toilet at court. She starts questioning Paul's innocence. Paul is advised by his barrister to claim he had consensual sex with Rebecca. Marie starts wondering why she has stayed married to Paul, despite his numerous extra-marital affairs.
4	"Episode 4"	Marc Munden	Jack Thorne	11 October 2016	4.00
Marie has sex with Karl, Paul's former comedy partner, who has been in love with her for decades. Only two of Paul's accusers have persisted in their claims. In court, Christina is proven to have lied, claiming that Paul raped her in his luxury car, which was in fact being driven by Marie (who committed a traffic offence, proven by police records) in another city that day. Rebecca, once a besotted admirer, is ridiculed by Paul's (female) barrister for having written him a fan letter a year after the alleged assault. Paul is cleared of raping both women. A flashback sequence confirms that he did not put the 15 year old Christina in a taxi. Instead, she stayed in the house, presumably to have a drink with him, and he kissed her. Further flashbacks show that Paul, who had recently learned that the TV network was losing interest in him and wanted to promote Karl as a bigger star, had rough sex with Rebecca in his caravan whilst filming on location. It is revealed that Karl was outside the caravan and overheard Rebecca's screams, this is implied as role-playing by early dialogue. However, not wanting to tarnish his own career and due to guilt from lusting after and finally sleeping with Paul's wife, he backs Paul in court claiming to not remember the event at all. After the verdict, in which Paul is found not guilty of all charges, it is implied that Marie leaves Paul and his relationship with Dee seems strained.

== Reception ==
National Treasure received universal acclaim from critics, with a Metacritic rating of 81 out of 100 based on 21 reviews.
