= Square Mile (magazine) =

- Editor: Mark Hedley
- Categories: Business and lifestyle magazine
- Frequency: Monthly
- Total circulation: 58,728 (ABC Jul - Dec 2017)
- Founder: Tim Slee and Stephen Murphy
- First issue: July 2005
- Company: Threadneedle Media
- Country: United Kingdom
- Based in: London
- Language: English
- Website: squaremile.com

Square Mile is a British luxury lifestyle magazine distributed primarily in the City of London.

It was founded in 2005 as a publication targeted at professionals in London’s financial district. Distributed in banking and investment offices, the magazine quickly gained popularity among the City’s affluent workforce, evolving from a more financial focus into a broader luxury lifestyle publication.

The magazine specialises in celebrity interviews, luxury watches, travel, fashion, motoring, property, food and drink. Over the years, Square Mile has expanded beyond its print edition, launching squaremile.com, a website offering exclusive online content, interviews, and reviews. The website has helped the brand reach a global audience, extending its influence beyond the City of London.

Square Mile is published by Threadneedle Media, a London-based media group specialising in premium lifestyle content. Other magazines in its portfolio include HEDGE, Escapism and Foodism.

== Notable interviews ==
Square Mile has featured multiple actors, musicians and sports stars on its cover over the past 20 years. Notable past cover stars include:

Actors

- Henry Cavill
- Kevin Costner
- Leonardo DiCaprio
- Kevin Bacon
- Sir Michael Caine
- Sir Patrick Stewart
- Tom Felton
- David Oyelowo
- Sam Heughan
- Tom Ellis
- Isla Fisher
- Rege-Jean Page

Sports stars

- David Beckham
- Lewis Hamilton
- Daniel Ricciardo
- Nico Rosberg
- Max Verstappen
- Tyson Fury
- Anthony Joshua

Musicians

- David Guetta
- Steve Aoki
- Lenny Kravitz
- Will.I.Am

Influencers

- Dan Bilzerian
- Logan Paul
- KSI

== History ==
The first issue of Square Mile was published in July 2005. The magazine was launched by Square Up Media in London, which was founded by Tim Slee and Stephen Murphy. It was taken over by Threadneedle Media in 2020.

The magazine is edited by Mark Hedley, who was part of the original launch team – and has worked on every issue since. Hedley won Editor of the Year 2014 at the PPA Independent Publisher Awards, and was shortlisted at the BSME Editor of the Year 2015. He is now managing director of Square Mile's publisher, Threadneedle Media.

== Square Mile Watch Awards ==
The Square Mile Watch Awards are London's first consumer awards celebrating the best of mechanical watchmaking – from the finest technological innovations to the best value launches of the year.

Categories include: Adventure; Art & Design; Brand of the Year; Collaboration; Editor's Choice; Gateway; Heritage; Icon; Industry Hero; Readers' Choice; Technical; Watch of the Year
