= Charles Pattinson =

British television producer

Charles Pattinson (sometimes credited as Charlie Pattinson) is a British television producer. His initial career was in the theatre, where he was an assistant director at the Royal Court Theatre in the mid-1980s. In 1985 he moved into television, joining the staff of the BBC as a production trainee, before eventually becoming a producer in the drama department.

He produced a variety of series and one-offs for the Corporation during the 1990s, of which the best known are 1996's Our Friends in the North (winner of the 1997 Best Drama Serial accolades from both the British Academy Television Awards and the Royal Television Society) and the 1997 Jimmy McGovern serial The Lakes.

In 1998, he and fellow producer George Faber set up their own independent production company, Company Pictures. The company has produced several notable and award-winning series and one-offs, such as Shameless, The Life and Death of Peter Sellers, Skins, Elizabeth I, Talk to Me and Wild At Heart. In 2014, he executive produced The Missing for New Pictures. He was an executive producer executive on the 2018 supernatural drama television series Requiem.
