= 1242: Gateway to the West =

2025 Hungarian history action film

- Directed by: Péter Soós
- Written by: Aron Horvath; Joan Lane
- Produced by: Carlos Alperin; Bayar Banzragch; Bill Chamberlain; Kornél Sipos; Bumchin Namshir
- Starring: Jeremy Neumark Jones; Neil Stuke; Bold Choimbol; Genevieve Chenneour; Michael Ironside; Eric Roberts; David Schofield; Ray Stevenson
- Cinematography: István Balázs
- Edited by: Kant Pan
- Music by: Arthur Valentin Grósz
- Production companies: Chelsea Pictures; Galloping Entertainment; Mozgó Mozi; Mongol Sat
- Release date: October 2, 2025
- Country: Hungary
- Languages: English; Mongolian

1242: Gateway to the West is a 2025 English-language Hungarian historical action film directed by Péter Soós and co-written by Aron Horvath and Joan Lane. The film features an ensemble cast including Jeremy Neumark Jones, Neil Stuke, Bold Choimbol, Genevieve Chenneour, Michael Ironside, Eric Roberts, David Schofield, and Ray Stevenson in his final film role.

== Plot summary ==
When the Great Mongolian Army is about to invade Europe in 1242, it doesn't expect that the Hungarian castle of Esztergom and its priest, Eusebius, will stop it.

== Cast ==
- Jeremy Neumark Jones as Eusebius
- Neil Stuke as Commander Simon
- Bold Choimbol as Batu Khan
- Genevieve Chenneour as Uulan
- Michael Ironside as Mihály / Narrator
- Eric Roberts as Captain Ákos
- David Schofield as Sycardius
- Ray Stevenson as Cesareane
- Tam Williams as Bacsó
- Farid Elouardi as Csikász
- Barslkhagva Batbold as Khasi
- Thomas Raft as Commander Simon's guard Tomas

== Production ==
In May 2022, Kevin Spacey was cast in the leading role of Papal Legate Cardinal Cesareani. However, two months later, in July 2022, he was dropped from the role following new sexual assault charges against him. He was replaced with Ray Stevenson. Stevenson died in May 2023, during post-production of this film and while he was working on his next project, Cassino in Ischia. Since the latter role was taken over by another actor, 1242 will be his final appearance on film.
