= George Faber (TV producer) =

British television producer

- Born: George Stephen John Faber; 30 November 1959 (age 66); Kensington, London, England
- Occupation: Television producer
- Years active: 1988–present
- Known for: Founder and joint managing director of Company Pictures; Founder of The Forge

George Stephen John Faber (born 30 November 1959) is a British television producer and media executive best known as the co-founder of Company Pictures and the founder of The Forge Entertainment.

Over several decades, Faber has played a major role in the development of British television drama, overseeing critically acclaimed and commercially successful productions for broadcasters including the BBC, Channel 4, ITV, HBO, Netflix, Disney+ and Apple TV. He is regarded within the television industry as an influential figure in the rise of the British independent drama production sector.

== Career ==
Faber began his television career at the BBC, where he worked as a script editor, producer, and executive producer before eventually becoming Head of Single Drama.

In 1998, Faber co-founded Company Pictures alongside Charlie Pattinson. Under his leadership, the company became one of the United Kingdom’s most successful independent television production companies. Major productions during this period included Shameless, Skins, Wild at Heart, Inspector George Gently, The Devil's Whore and The Life and Death of Peter Sellers. Company Pictures was twice winner of Best Independent Production Company at the Broadcast Awards and also winner of Best European Production Company at the Monte-Carlo Television Festival.

After leaving Company Pictures, Faber founded The Forge Entertainment in 2014. The company was created to focus on original and innovative scripted drama, collaborating with both established and emerging writers and directors. Projects by The Forge include National Treasure, Ackley Bridge, Help, Becoming Elizabeth and The Buccaneers, winning awards from the British Academy of Film and Television Arts, the Royal Television Society, the Peabody Awards, Rose d'Or and the International Academy of Television Arts and Sciences.

In 2023, The Forge was acquired by Banijay UK, with Faber continuing to lead the company. In 2026, he transitioned from Managing Director to Executive Chairman, remaining actively involved in executive production and strategic development.

== Personal life ==
Faber was born on 30 November 1959 in Kensington in London.

== Notable projects ==
- Collateral (BBC/Netflix)
- National Treasure (Channel 4)
- London Irish (Channel 4)
- The White Queen (BBC)
- The Village (BBC)
- Secret State (Channel 4)
- Beaver Falls (E4)
- The Shadow Line (BBC)
- The Runaway (Sky 1)
- Women in Love (BBC)
- The Silence (BBC)
- Generation Kill (HBO)
- The Devil's Whore (Channel 4)
- Einstein and Eddington (BBC)
- The Invisibles (BBC)
- The Palace (ITV)
- Life Is Wild (The CW)
- Talk to Me (ITV)
- Mansfield Park (ITV)
- Shameless (Channel 4)
- Skins (Channel 4)
- Inspector George Gently (BBC)
- Wild at Heart (ITV)
- Wallis & Edward (ITV)
- The Ghost Squad (Channel 4)
- The Life and Death of Peter Sellers (HBO/BBC)
- The Rotters' Club (BBC)
- Elizabeth I (Channel 4/HBO)
- Marian, Again (ITV)
- Not Only But Always (Channel 4)
- Tom Brown's Schooldays (ITV)
- Lawless (ITV)
- P.O.W. (ITV)
- Sparkling Cyanide (ITV)
- 40 (Channel 4)
- Unconditional Love (ITV)
- Sons and Lovers (ITV)
- Serious & Organised (ITV)
- Rose and Maloney (ITV)
- White Teeth (Channel 4)
- Nicholas Nickleby (ITV)
- North Square (Channel 4)
- Anna Karenina (Channel 4)
- Cor, Blimey! (ITV)
- Never Never (Channel 4)
- The Lakes (BBC)
- The Young Person's Guide to Becoming a Rock Star (Channel 4)
