= Company Pictures =

British television production company

- Type: Subsidiary
- Industry: Film; Television
- Founded: 1998; 28 years ago
- Founders: Charles Pattinson; George Faber
- Headquarters: London, United Kingdom
- Key people: Michele Buck (CEO)
- Products: Motion pictures Television programmes
- Parent: All3Media (2003–2026); Banijay UK (2026–present)
- Website: www.companypictures.co.uk

Company Pictures is a British television production company which has produced drama programming for many broadcasters. It was set up in 1998 by Charles Pattinson and George Faber, colleagues at BBC Films. Their first film was Morvern Callar, which was credited as a co-production with BBC Films as they had begun developing it while still employed there. In 2003 Company Pictures became part of All3Media. In 2026, Company Pictures became part of Banijay UK due to the merger between Banijay Entertainment and All3Media.

In 2012, founders Pattinson and Faber left Company Pictures to set up another independent production company, with John Yorke became managing director until 2015. He was succeeded by Michele Buck, former joint managing director of Mammoth Screen.

For both artistic and fiscal reasons, when producing the TV series The White Queen, Company Pictures entered into collaboration with a Flemish production house. This enabled them to film in the medieval cities of Ghent and Bruges, while receiving tax-breaks as a European co-production and for investment in Flanders.
