= Lawless (British TV series) =

- Genre: Crime drama
- Written by: Chris Lang
- Directed by: Roger Gartland
- Starring: Trevor Eve; Orla Brady; David Calder; Ralph Brown; Dermot Crowley; Darrell D'Silva
- Composer: The Insects
- Country of origin: United Kingdom
- Original language: English
- No. of series: 1
- No. of episodes: 2

Production
- Executive producers: George Faber; Charles Pattinson; George Palmer
- Producer: Tom Grieves
- Production locations: Newcastle upon Tyne, Tyne and Wear, England, UK
- Cinematography: Mike Spragg
- Editor: Jamie McCoan
- Running time: 90 minutes
- Production company: Company Pictures

Original release
- Network: ITV
- Release: 8 November – 9 November 2004

Lawless is a two-part British television thriller miniseries, first broadcast on ITV on 8 and 9 November 2004.

An early credit for screenwriter Chris Lang, perhaps best known for his long-running series Unforgotten, Lawless follows the story of DI John Paxton, who ends up on the run after a murderer walks free from court because of a legal technicality, which in turn results in the death of his beloved boss and best friend.

The series was directed by Roger Gartland and starred Trevor Eve, Orla Brady and David Calder.

== Production ==
The series was one of two projects commissioned by ITV in 2003 written by Lang, with the other being Amnesia, starring John Hannah.

Trevor Eve said of his role in the series; "In one scene I had to drag myself out of the Tyne. They'd [the producers] selected a particularly filthy dockside for the purpose, so that wasn't particularly enjoyable. I have to say the novelty of stunts and things like that has gone for me. The driving, I like. I did a lot of the driving stunts myself and there's a lot of racing around Newcastle. But the jumping off the bridge – the stuntman did that one!

The beard comes off in a vain attempt to not look like the person the police are looking for. I didn't really grow the beard for a part, but I did Troy last year and when I got back to the UK, I literally went straight on to set and they started to shave off the beard, but then realised that underneath my skin was white – whereas the rest of my face was quite tanned. So we decided to keep it rather than have to wear loads of make-up. I hate shaving anyway, so I'm glad it's proved a popular look."

== Reception ==
Lawless achieved credible viewing figures, with the first part watched by 7.17 million, and the second by 5.65 million.

== Cast ==
- Trevor Eve as DI John Paxton
- David Calder as DCI Pete Chambers
- Orla Brady as DC Liz Bird
- Ralph Brown as DC Phil Howell
- Darrell D'Silva as DC Mark Easton
- Tracy Gillman as DC Amy Graves
- Dermot Crowley as DCI Bob Allard
- Paul Brennen as Det. Supt. Jack Harris
- Jacqueline King as Kate Chambers
- Michael Hodgson as Sean Kinney
- Christopher Connel as Patrick Kinney
- Danielle Lydon as Louise Paxton

== Episodes ==
No.	Title	Directed by	Written by	Original release date	UK viewers (millions)
1	"Episode 1"	Roger Gartland	Chris Lang	8 November 2004	7.17
Sean Kinney, a long time adversary of the police, stabs and kills DS Jimmy Burns in broad daylight. When his colleague, DI John Paxton, gives chase, Kinney pulls a gun and shoots an innocent seven year old girl. Paxton manages to arrest Kinney, but when the case comes to court, it transpires forensics officers cross-contaminated evidence from the scene and a search of Kinney's flat, which leads to a mistrial being declared and Kinney walking free. DCI Pete Chambers, unable to cope with the guilt of Kinney's freedom, rallies his team and conspires to kill Kinney to stop him from re-offending. Paxton objects, but spurred on and later joined by DCs Phil Howell, Mark Easton and Amy Graves, Chambers ambushes Kinney in a hideout and drowns him in the bath. Later that night, Chambers calls Paxton and arranges a meet. But when Paxton arrives, he finds Chambers dead and a police ambush waiting. Choosing to flee, Paxton escapes a dogged police pursuit by throwing himself into the Tyne.
2	"Episode 2"	Roger Gartland	Chris Lang	9 November 2004	5.65
Paxton, now on the run, tries to find out who is responsible for Chambers' death, but his behaviour continues to spiral wildly out of control, including breaking into Chambers' home and assaulting both his wife and an unsuspecting B&B owner. Meanwhile, DCI Bob Allard of internal affairs smells a rat and suspects Paxton is being framed. Howell, Easton and Graves, with assistance from Liz Bird, who finds herself unwittingly implicated, desperately try to cover their tracks as the internal investigation gathers pace. Paxton manages to inform Allard that Chambers discovered official documentation relating to the case had been tampered with shortly before his death, and that he suspected someone on the team may have been taking bribes from Kinney, particularly when it transpires it is the second time Kinney has escaped prison when a mistrial has been declared. With bitterness slowly beginning to creep in, and the team now all at loggerheads with each other, it doesn't take long for the culprit to reveal themselves.
