= Chris Lang =

British screenwriter and actor

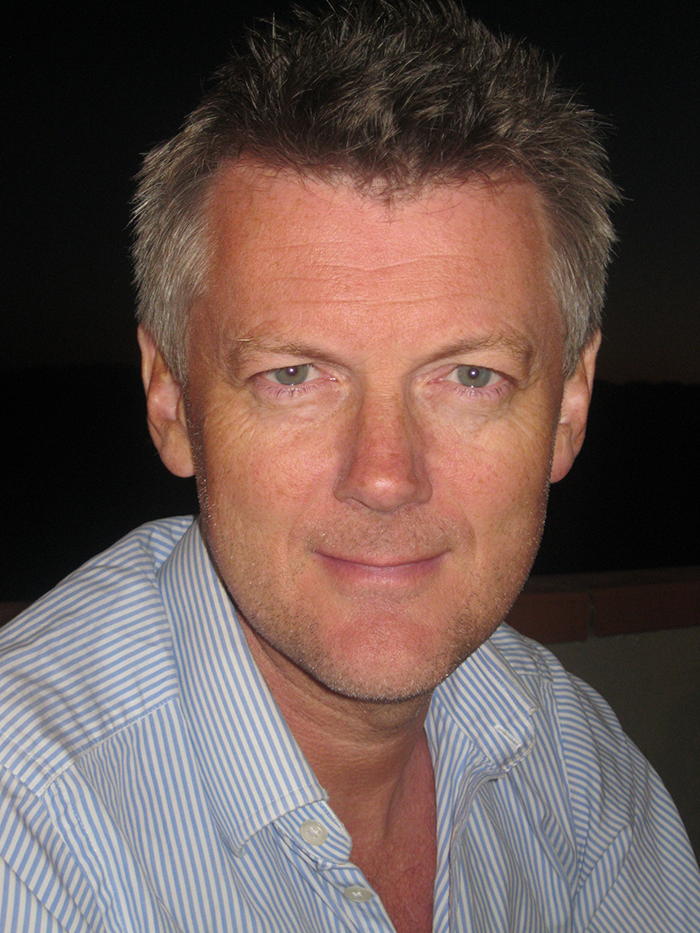
- Lang in 2014
- Born: Lambeth, London, England
- Occupations: Screenwriter, television producer, actor
- Children: 5
- Writing career
- Period: 1985–present
- Notable works: The Thief, His Wife and the Canoe (2022) Amnesia (2004); Torn (2007); A Mother's Son (2012); Undeniable (2014); Unforgotten (2015–present); Innocent (2018–2021) Dark Heart (2018)

Chris Lang is a British screenwriter, producer, and actor. Lang has written many British television series but is best known as the writer, creator, and executive producer of Unforgotten.

== Early life and education ==
Chris Lang was educated at Reigate Grammar School and then at RADA, where he won the Royal Academy award for "A Series of Outstanding Performances in the Vanbrugh Theatre". He graduated in 1983.

== Career ==
=== Actor ===
In his youth, Lang formed a comedy revue called The Jockeys of Norfolk with Andy Taylor and Hugh Grant.

He worked as an actor on such British television series as Shadow of the Noose, Drop the Dead Donkey, Outside Edge, A Dance to the Music of Time, and All Along the Watchtower.

He stopped acting in the mid nineties in order to fully concentrate on his writing career.

=== Screenwriter ===
Lang began his screenwriting career on The Bill, for which he wrote many episodes, and for which he won a Writer's Guild award. He went on to write episodes for shows including Casualty, Soldier Soldier, The Knock, POW, Primeval, Hustle, and The Tunnel for Sky Atlantic.

In 2001, he wrote and created his first original drama series The Glass, which starred John Thaw and Sarah Lancashire. Other original work has included Sirens, Unconditional Love, Amnesia (which was nominated for an Edgar Award), Lawless, and The Reckoning

The first series of Unforgotten, starring Nicola Walker, Trevor Eve, Sir Tom Courtenay, and Sanjeev Bhaskar, was broadcast in autumn 2015. Courtenay later won the 2016 BAFTA for Best Supporting Actor for his role. The second series aired in January 2017 to an audience of 7.29 million, with the Daily Telegraph describing the series as "the detective drama of the decade". In November 2017 Mark Bonnar won the 2017 Best Actor BAFTA Scotland for his portrayal of Colin Osborne in the series. The third series aired in July 2018 and received universal critical acclaim. The last episode was watched by over 7.5 million viewers, making it the most watched episode of all three series.

In December 2018, The Hook Up Plan, an eight-part romantic comedy starring Zita Hanrot, created and co-written by Lang, aired on Netflix. A second series was broadcast in 2020.

In October 2018, a six-part drama called Dark Heart, which Lang wrote and executive produced, and which starred Tom Riley and Charlotte Riley, broadcast in the UK, with the first episode attracting an audience of 6.3 million.

In February 2021 Unforgotten returned for a fourth series, to universal critical acclaim and an average rating across the series of 9.5 million, up on series 3 by an average of 2.5 million per episode. It was nominated as best drama by both BAFTA and Royal Television Society. A few months later series 4 was broadcast in the states on PBS. It returned for a fifth series in February 2023 with Sinead Keenan replacing Nicola Walker's role, starring alongside Sanjeev Bhaskar and aired to a first episode audience of 8.4 million, making it the highest rated ITV programme of the year, and third most watched drama across all channels. The 6th series was broadcast in February 2025, to a first night audience of 8.1m and series 7 was announced following broadcast, and went in to production in 2026.

In April 2022, he saw the broadcast of The Thief, His Wife and the Canoe starring Monica Dolan and Eddie Marsan, the true story of John and Anne Darwin, which Lang wrote and for which he was the executive producer. It aired to a first episode audience of 10.01 million, making it the third most watched UK drama of the year. The series was selected for competition at the Geneva International Film Festival in November 2022, and was nominated for Best Serial at the Broadcast Awards 2022. It was also nominated as best mini series by BAFTA 2023 and by BPG 2023. It was also nominated as best drama series at the Edinburgh TV Festival 2023.

In 2024, Lang's new show I, Jack Wright started shooting in the UK. Starring John Simm, Nikki Amuka-Bird, Gemma Jones, Daniel Rigby, and James Fleet, and was broadcast on the BBC in July 2026, Following its success, a second series was commissioned, which will be broadcast on the BBC and Britbox in early 2027. Lang serves as creator, writer and executive producer.

In the summer of 2026, Lang wrote and executive produced 'The Trial of Mavis Eccleston' , starring Sir Jonathan Pryce and Dame Penelope Wilton, a four part true life drama, it will broadcast in early 2027.

=== TXTV ===
In the late 2000s, Lang co-founder TXTV, through which he made much of his work, including Innocent, a four-part thriller starring Lee Ingleby, Hermione Norris, Nigel Lindsay, and Angel Coulby. broadcast in May 2018. It returned for a second series, which broadcast on Monday 17 May 2021.

Other TXTV shows include Undeniable, starring Peter Firth and Claire Goose, which aired in April 2014. It was remade in France in February 2017, entitled Quand Je Serai Grande Je Te Tuerai starring Laetitia Milot. Filmed on the Île de Ré it broadcast in France in late 2017 to an audience of seven million.

A Mother's Son, starring Hermione Norris, Paul McGann, and Martin Clunes (September 2012) was nominated for a Broadcast Award, and adapted as a single film for TF1 in France called Tu Es Mon Fils (April 2015), starring Anne Marivin. Tu Es Mon Fils later won best single film at the Polar de Cognac Film Festival.

Lang's series Torn, starring Holly Aird and Nicola Walker, was nominated for an RTS award. and was also remade for French TV as Entre Deux Mères It was shown at the Luchon Film and TV festival and broadcast on TF1 on 27 March 2017.

The French remake of his 2010 TXTV drama The Reckoning starred Odille Vuillemin and Thiery Neuvic and aired in September 2018. In January 2021 it was announced that Viaplay/Elisa were remaking A Mother's Son in Finland. Retitled Polanski Joel, it broadcast in mid 2022.

== Personal life ==
Lang's first wife died by suicide in 2007. Lang and his second wife share five children.

He has said that underlying happiness is very little affected by career success.

== Selected work ==
- I, Jack Wright (BBC 2026)
- The Thief, His Wife and the Canoe (Story Films 2022)
- Innocent (TXTV, 2018–2021)
- Dark Heart (Silverprint, 2018)
- Unforgotten (Mainstreet Pictures, 2015–present)
- Undeniable (TXTV, 2014)
- A Mother's Son (ITV Studios 2012)
- Torn (TXTV, 2007)
- Lawless (Company Pictures, 2004)
- Amnesia (Ecosse Films, 2004)

== Awards and nominations ==
- Unforgotten Maximilian Fairley Nominated for 'Breakthrough Award' Royal Television Society 2026
- I, Jack Wright. Nominated Best Drama Series. C21 Awards 2025
- Unforgotten Maximilian Fairley Nominated for 'Breakthrough Performance' Edinburgh TV Festival 2025
- The Thief, His Wife and the Canoe Nominated for best drama Edinburgh TV Festival 2023
- The Thief, His Wife and the Canoe Nominated for best mini series BAFTA 2023
- The Thief, His Wife and the Canoe Monica Dolan nominated best actor Royal Television Society 2023
- The Thief, His Wife and the Canoe. Nominated Best series BPG 2022
- The Thief, His Wife and the Canoe Nominated Best serial 'Broadcast Awards' 2022
- The Thief, His Wife and the Canoe Nominated for Best TV soundtrack at The Ivors
- Unforgotten. Nominated Best drama BAFTA 2021
- Unforgotten Nominated best drama Royal Television Society 2021
- Unforgotten Chris Lang nominated for BPG best writer 2021
- Unforgotten Nominated Best Returning Drama 2021 National Television Awards
- Unforgotten. Alex Jennings nominated Best Supporting Actor BAFTA 2019
- Unforgotten. Chris Lang Nominated Best Crime Drama Writer 2017 London Screenwriters' Festival
- Unforgotten Mark Bonnar Winner of 2017 Best Actor BAFTA Scotland
- Unforgotten Mark Bonnar Winner of BPG award best actor. 2017
- Unforgotten: Tom Courtenay, winner of 2016 BAFTA for best supporting actor
- Unforgotten: Tom Courtenay, nominated for 2016 Royal Television Society award for Best Actor
- Unforgotten:Nicola Walker nominated for BPG award Best Actress 2016
- Unforgotten. Nominated Best English Speaking Drama Series. C21 Awards 2016
- Unforgotten. Nominated Best Casting. C21 Awards 2016
- The Tunnel Winner Best Multi Channel Programme BPG 2014
- The Tunnel Nominated Best Drama Series International Emmy Award2014
- A Mother's Son: nominated Best Single Drama 'Broadcast Awards' 2013
- Torn nominated Best Serial, Royal Television Society 2008
- Amnesia: nominated Best Mini Series at the Edgars 2005
- Wing and a Prayer: Winner of best drama series BAFTA Award 1998
- The Bill. Winner 'Best Original Drama Series' 1995 Writer's Guild of Great Britain.
