= Alexander Arnold (actor) =

English actor, singer, and musician

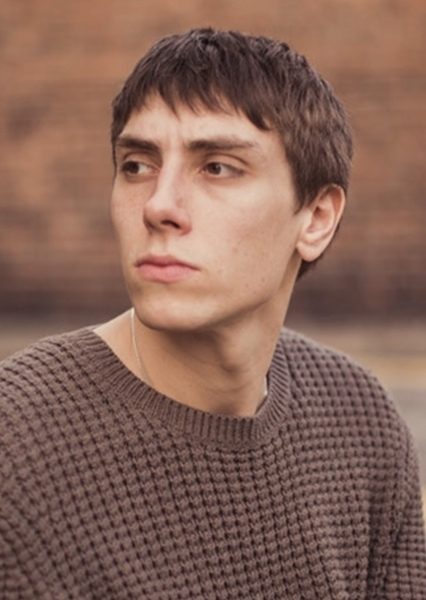
- Born: 21 December 1992 (age 33); Ashford, Kent, England
- Other name: Alex Arnold
- Occupations: Actor; musician; singer
- Years active: 2010–present

Alexander Arnold (born 21 December 1992) is an English actor, singer, and musician, best known for his role as Rich Hardbeck in the E4 teen drama Skins.

== Career ==
=== Acting ===
Arnold made his professional debut in the fifth and sixth series of the E4 teen drama Skins, playing the keen metalhead Rich Hardbeck. He got the role while still in the sixth form through the open audition process in London. In September 2011, he starred in the music video “Death Cloud” by Cloud Control. Directed by the award-winning Luke Snellin, it was shot in Spain over two days.

He starred in a two-part ITV drama called A Mother's Son, written by Chris Lang and first screened in September 2012. In 2013, he appeared in the BBC Three zombie drama In the Flesh, and in the third series of crime drama Vera. He also earned a starring role as Adam in the television series What Remains. In 2015, he joined the cast of Poldark, a new BBC series based on The Poldark Novels.

Arnold landed his first film role in the 2014 western The Salvation, shot in South Africa.

=== Music ===
Arnold enjoys playing the bass guitar, and is the lead singer of an indie band called Circuithouse.

== Charity work ==
In April 2011, Arnold donated a painting of his childhood bear to The Bristol Autism Project, which helps autistic children in Bristol.

== Filmography ==
Key
†	Denotes projects that have not yet been released

=== Film ===
Year	Title	Role	Notes	Ref.
2013	Mickey & Michaela Bury Their Dad	Mickey	Short film	
2014	The Salvation	Voichek Borowski		
2014	Nighthawks	Jack	Short film	
2015	The Son	The Kid	Short film	
2016	The Removal	Mick	Short film	
2016	David Brent: Life on the Road	Pog		
2017	My Cousin Rachel	Young Lad		
2017	Film Stars Don't Die in Liverpool	Anaesthetist		
2019	Yesterday	Gavin		
2019	The Outpost	Sergeant Chris Griffin		
2021	Creation Stories	Jim Reid		
2022	The Chromakey Man	Dan	Short film	
2024	The Last Breath	Brett		
2024	The Entertainer	Joe		
2024	Meet Me by the Sea	Oliver	Short film	
2024	Fine Dining	Luke	Short film	
2024	Marble Dust	Nick	Short film	
2025	Delivery Run	Lee		
2025	Fuze	Corporal Martin		
2026	What Goes Round (Or Things That Go Bump in the Night)	Headphone Man	Short film	
TBA	Blueberry Inn †	Louis	Post-production	
TBA	The Intimacy Coordinator †	Nigel	Short film	

=== Television ===
Year	Title	Role	Notes	Ref.
2011–2012	Skins	Rich Hardbeck	Series regular; 16 episodes	
2012	A Mother's Son	Jamie Cutler	Miniseries; 2 episodes	
2013	In the Flesh	Alex	Episode: "Series 1, Episode 1"	
2013	Vera	Sam Bishop	Episode: "Castles in the Air"	
2013	What Remains	Adam Moss	Miniseries; 4 episodes	
2014	Silk	David Cowdrey	Episode: "The Goodbye Kid"	
2015	Foyle's War	Daniel Woolf	Episode: "Trespass"	
2015	Poldark	Jim Carter	Recurring role; 4 episodes	
2015	Capital	Parker	Miniseries; 2 episodes	
2016	Death in Paradise	Matt Holt	Episode: "Dishing Up Murder"	
2018	Save Me	Luke	Recurring role; 6 episodes	
2022	Signora Volpe	Sasha Pavlenko	Episode: "Truffles & Treachery"	
2022	Pistol	Jamie Reid	Miniseries; 3 episodes	
2025	Just Act Normal	Rory	Recurring role; 2 episodes	

=== Music videos ===
Year	Song	Artist
2011	Death Cloud	Cloud Control
2016	Painkillers	Brian Fallon
2019	The Races	Sports Team

== Theatre credits ==
Year	Title	Role	Venue	Ref
2014	Four Minutes Twelve Seconds	Nick	Hampstead Theatre, London	
2015	Luna Gale	Peter	Hampstead Theatre, London	
2015	Crushed Shells and Mud	Vince	Southwark Playhouse, London	
2016	Shopping and Fucking	Robbie	Lyric Theatre, London	
2019	Bitter Wheat	Roberto	Garrick Theatre, London	
2025	Most Favoured	Mike	Soho Theatre, London	
