= I, Jack Wright =

British television series

- Genre: Thriller
- Created by: Chris Lang
- Screenplay by: Chris Lang
- Directed by: Tom Vaughan
- Country of origin: United Kingdom
- Original language: English
- No. of series: 1
- No. of episodes: 6

Production
- Executive producers: Chris Lang; Polly Williams; Arielle Gottlieb; Tom Vaughan; Helen Perry
- Producer: Nickie Sault
- Production company: Federation Stories

Original release
- Network: U&Alibi
- Release: 23 April 2025 – present

I, Jack Wright is a 2025 British thriller television series created by Chris Lang and starring John Simm, Nikki Amuka-Bird, Daniel Rigby and Trevor Eve. The series was broadcast in the United Kingdom on U&Alibi from 23 April 2025, and debuted on BBC One and iPlayer on 12 July 2026.

== Premise ==
Following an apparent suicide, a wealthy patriarch's will and testament surprisingly leaves virtually nothing of his wealth to his third wife and three sons.

== Cast and characters ==
=== Main ===
- Nikki Amuka-Bird as Sally Wright, Jack's third wife
- Gemma Jones as Rose Wright, Jack's first wife
- Zoë Tapper as Georgia Wright, John's wife
- Daniel Rigby as John Wright, Jack and Rose's second son
- Ruby Ashbourne Serkis as Emily Wright, Gray's daughter
- Harry Lloyd as DCI Hector Morgan
- Liz Kingsman as DC Katie Jones
- Percelle Ascott as Reuben Maguire, Emily's boyfriend
- Rakhee Thakrar as Laura Johnstone, Jack's new lawyer and executor of his will
- James Fleet as Bobby Botham, Rose's friend
- Niamh Cusack as Annie Rouse, Jack's executive assistant
- Trevor Eve as Jack Wright
- John Simm as Gray Wright, Jack and Rose's first son

=== Recurring ===
- Sabrina Bartlett as Bella Horrell, Gray's girlfriend
- Callum Adams as Kyle
- Tim Faraday as Derek Coates, Jack's estate manager
- Eden Hollingsworth as Daisy Wright, Jack and Sally's daughter
- Samuel Small as Josh Wright, Jack and Sally's son
- Victoria Broom as Mary Robbins, Jack's housekeeper
- Nick Harris as Ben Hargreaves, Jack's previous lawyer
- James Wilby as Max Preston, Sally's lawyer

Jack's second wife is deceased and his daughter with his second wife, Asha Bell, is not shown.

== Production ==
The series was announced for UKTV in February 2024, with Chris Lang writing the script and Federation Stories producing. The series is directed by Tom Vaughan and produced by Nickie Sault. Executive producers are Polly Williams, Arielle Gottlieb, Lang and Tom Vaughan, and, for UKTV, Helen Perry.

The cast is led by John Simm and Nikki Amuka-Bird. In March 2024, Trevor Eve, Daniel Rigby, Ruby Serkis, Harry Lloyd, Liz Kingsman and James Fleet were among those who joined the cast.

Filming for the show began in March 2024. First-look images from the set were released to the press in August 2024.

A title card at the end of the final episode states "to be continued". It was confirmed in March 2026 that a second series has been acquired by the BBC. Nikki Amuka-Bird, John Simm, Daniel Rigby, Ruby Ashbourne Serkis and Harry Lloyd were confirmed to be back as their key characters, while two new characters are to be played by Tom Austen and Zora Bishop. Filming of series 2 started in February 2026.

== Broadcast ==
The first series was broadcast in the United Kingdom on U&Alibi from 23 April 2025, and on BBC One and iPlayer from 12 July 2026. Series 2 will start airing on BBC One and streaming on iPlayer in the U.K., rather than on U&Alibi, and on BritBox in the U.S.

== Reception ==
Ben Dowell for The Times praised the stellar cast but criticised the character development of some of the minor characters.

Michael Hogan for The Daily Telegraph praised the production values and the strength of the cast in awarding the show four stars. Hogan also praised the show for additional interviews set two years into the future which bookend the episodes, feeling that the device "added momentum, seeded clues and left the plot intriguingly poised".

James Hibbs for the Radio Times thought that "as a character study and a family drama, it works, with enough twists and turns to keep thing[s] interesting. It may not be the most cohesive piece of television you see this year, with far too much going on – but it is certainly an entertaining ride nonetheless." He did not like "the flash-forward interviews ... [which] add to the sense of mystery, but also add an unnecessary layer of artificiality. Many of them look and feel both tacked on and also a bit cheap, detracting from the more impressive work done throughout the bulk of the episodes."

In The Sydney Morning Herald, Lenny Ann Low wrote that the characters hold the series together: "On paper, it’s almost a British version of Succession with its wealthy patriarch ... and suite of diabolically different family members fighting for his inheritance. ... I, Jack Wright is set in the present day but the cavalcade of characters-with-a-secret, the ramped-up suspense and liberal dose of red herrings evokes Christie’s plots, albeit with mobile phones and fashionable neck tattoos. It’s a riot of fun because Lang’s characters are believable, the show rips along and it’s beautifully shot."
