= Undeniable (TV series) =

- Genre: Thriller
- Written by: Chris Lang
- Directed by: John Strickland
- Starring: Claire Goose; Peter Firth; Christine Bottomley; Pippa Haywood; Nick Lee
- Composer: Paul Englishby
- Country of origin: United Kingdom
- Original language: English
- No. of series: 1
- No. of episodes: 2

Production
- Executive producers: Matthew Arlidge; Ronan Flynn; Chris Lang
- Producer: Jeremy Gwilt
- Cinematography: Ian Moss
- Editor: Michael Harrowes
- Running time: 60 minutes
- Production company: TXTV

Original release
- Network: ITV
- Release: 7 April – 14 April 2014

Undeniable is a two-part British television thriller serial first broadcast on ITV in 2014. Written by Chris Lang, directed by John Strickland and starring Claire Goose, Peter Firth and Christine Bottomley, Undeniable follows the story of Andrew Rawlins, a murderer who is brought to justice by the efforts of a woman, Jane Phillips, who witnessed him kill her mother when she was seven years old. The two-part thriller was announced on 1 November 2013, with location filming confirmed to take place later that month in Dublin and County Wicklow, Ireland. The thriller was released on DVD on 2 March 2015.

== Critical reception ==
Ellen Jones, writing for The Independent, said of the series

Undeniable, which began on ITV last night, is the televisual equivalent of those paperback thrillers you buy in the airport and chuck away at your destination: serviceably diverting in the moment, instantly forgettable afterwards. Claire Goose might not look back on playing Jane Phillips as a high point in her career, but she’s believable enough as our heroine, a happily married woman, pregnant with her second child. As a seven-year-old, Jane was the only witness to her mother’s murder and now, many years later, she believes she’s spotted the man responsible and is determined to bring him to justice. Jane might have an easier time of it, if the man she’d fingered for this crime wasn’t a well-respected consultant oncologist and all-round affable chap. Andrew Rawlins (Peter Firth) also has a fiercely loyal daughter, Emma (Christine Bottomley), who just happens to be a criminal lawyer.

For his part, Jane’s dad Pete (Robert Pugh) said he’d support his daughter, but he didn’t look too convinced. There was also the awkward matter of Jane’s history of mental instability, and the two false accusations she’d made previously. At least her husband will stand by her. At least until he finds out she came off her anti-depressants and the contraceptive pill in a deliberate attempt to become pregnant with a son, just like her mother was when she died. Writer Chris Lang’s script diligently ensured that even by the very end of this episode the story’s ultimate resolution remained unguessable, but just a few more hints or red herrings might have made the prospect of episode two more tantalising. Is Rawlins actually a cold-blooded murderer? Or is Jane just hysterical? Preferably, the truth will turn out to be some diabolical combination of the two.

== Cast ==
- Claire Goose as Jane Fielding
- Peter Firth as Andrew Rawlins
- Christine Bottomley as Emma Rawlins
- Pippa Haywood as DI Alison Hall
- Nick Lee as DS Mark Renwick
- Shashi Rami as DSI Vikram Singh
- Sarah Winman as Beth Rawlins
- Robert Thompson as Max Rawlins
- Robert Pugh as Pete Phillips
- Felix Scott as Rob Feilding
- Alisha Kelly as Young Jane Phillips

== Episodes ==
No.	Title	Directed by	Written by	Original release date	UK viewers (millions)
1	"Episode 1"	John Strickland	Chris Lang	7 April 2014	6.31
Aged seven, Jane Phillips saw her mother murdered by a man who was never apprehended. Twenty-three years later, now a wife and mother with a second child due, she is convinced that oncologist Andrew Rawlins, whom she sees in a hospital, is the killer, and contacts Alison Hall, the officer in the original case, who is now about to retire. Jane has given up taking her anti-depressants and, coupled with the fact that she has made mistaken claims before, her father Pete and husband Rob are sceptical about this new identification. Furthermore, Andrew's blood, after he submits to a test, does not match the murderer's. Andrew's daughter Emma, a lawyer, visits Jane to warn her off but, despite the lack of evidence, Jane is still convinced that Andrew slew her mother.
2	"Episode 2"	John Strickland	Chris Lang	14 April 2014	5.99
With Andrew's DNA results exonerating him, Emma wants him to sue the police, but he refuses and also declines to take action against Jane when she attacks him - though she is made the subject of a restraining order. At the same time, Alison is approached by Jo, a nurse who once worked with Andrew, who claims that he once tried to sexually assault her and was well-known for forcing himself on women. Armed with this knowledge, Jane goes to see Andrew's ex-wife Isobel, to whom he was apparently violent. An angry Emma goes to see Isobel herself in the hope that Isobel will provide the resolution for the whole affair.
