= The Thief, His Wife and the Canoe =

British crime drama series

- Genre: Crime drama
- Created by: Chris Lang
- Based on: a memoir by David Leigh
- Written by: Chris Lang
- Directed by: Richard Laxton
- Starring: Eddie Marsan; Monica Dolan; Mark Stanley; Dominic Applewhite; Karl Pilkington
- Music by: Harry Escott; Ben Pearson
- Country of origin: United Kingdom
- Original language: English
- No. of seasons: 1
- No. of episodes: 4

Production
- Executive producers: Chris Lang; David Nath; Sofia Noronha
- Producer: Alison Sterling
- Production locations: Hartlepool; Walthamstow; Seaton Carew; Middlesbrough
- Cinematography: Sergio Delgado; Hermes Marco
- Editors: Barry Moen; James Taylor
- Production companies: Story Films; ITV

Original release
- Network: ITV
- Release: 17 April – 20 April 2022

The Thief, His Wife and the Canoe is an ITV television drama series that was first broadcast on 17 April 2022. Written by Chris Lang and directed by Richard Laxton, the programme dramatises the John Darwin disappearance case (2002–2007), where prison officer and teacher John Darwin faked his own death in a canoeing accident, and reappeared five and a half years after he was believed to have died.

== Cast ==
- Eddie Marsan as John Darwin
- Monica Dolan as Anne Darwin
- Mark Stanley as Mark Darwin
- Dominic Applewhite as Anthony Darwin
- Karl Pilkington as DC Phil Bayley

== Production ==
Hartlepool, Walthamstow, Seaton Carew and Middlesbrough were used as filming locations.

== Episodes ==
No.	Title	Directed by	Written by	Original release date	Viewers (millions)
1	"1.1"	Richard Laxton	Chris Lang	17 April 2022	10.09
2	"1.2"	Richard Laxton	Chris Lang	18 April 2022	9.23
3	"1.3"	Richard Laxton	Chris Lang	19 April 2022	8.62
4	"1.4"	Richard Laxton	Chris Lang	20 April 2022	8.81

== Reception ==
Stuart Jeffries for The Guardian gave the series four out of five stars.
