= A Mother's Son =

- DVD cover
- Created by: Chris Lang
- Directed by: Edward Bazalgette
- Starring: Hermione Norris; Martin Clunes; Paul McGann; Nicola Walker; Alexander Arnold
- Composer: Paul Englishby
- Country of origin: United Kingdom
- No. of series: 1
- No. of episodes: 2 (list of episodes)

Production
- Producer: Colin Wratten
- Cinematography: Tim Palmer
- Editor: Mark Davis
- Running time: 60 minutes (w/advertisements)

Original release
- Network: ITV
- Release: 3 September – 4 September 2012

A Mother's Son is a British crime drama television mini-series, created by Chris Lang, which was first broadcast on ITV on 3 and 4 September 2012. The series was produced by the ITV Studios. Hermione Norris, Martin Clunes, Paul McGann, Nicola Walker and Alexander Arnold star as the main protagonists of the series.

In 2015, A Mother's Son was adapted by Didier Le Pêcheur for French television in a co-production between EuropaCorp Television and ITV Studios France under the title Tu es mon fils. The French version, starring Anne Marivin, Thomas Jouannet and Charles Berling, first aired on TF1 on 23 February 2015, garnering 6.5 million viewers.

== Plot ==
Lorraine Mullary, a local schoolgirl, goes missing and is later found murdered, throwing the sleepy Suffolk market town of Eastlee in which she lived into turmoil. Among them are the newly merged family of Rosie (Hermione Norris) and Ben (Martin Clunes) and their four children. Rosie begins to worry about son Jamie (Alexander Arnold), suspecting him of lying to her about his movements on the night of Lorraine's murder. When she finds a stained pair of trainers hidden in his bedroom, she worries the stains might be blood. As the investigation continues, relationships in the family become strained. Jamie turns for support to his father David (Paul McGann). But Rosie finds she cannot suppress the growing fear that her son might be guilty of something truly terrible.

== Recording ==
The series was filmed in and around the town of Southwold in Suffolk (just ten miles south of Britain's most easterly point, Lowestoft), as well as the nearby village of Walberswick. Shops on Southwold high street became the backdrop for many scenes, with local residents given the chance to appear as extras to keep the plot as close to life as possible. A Mother's Son became the second drama series to be filmed in the town, following Michael Palin's East of Ipswich which was filmed and broadcast in 1987. Several scenes are also filmed in the Hertfordshire village of Kings Langley.

== Cast ==
- Hermione Norris as Rosie Cutler
- Martin Clunes as Ben Banks
- Paul McGann as David Cutler
- Alexander Arnold as Jamie Cutler
- Ellie Bamber as Olivia 'Livvy' Cutler
- Jake Davies as Rob Banks
- Antonia Clarke as Jess Banks
- Juliet Yorke as Lorraine Mullary
- Annabelle Apsion as Kay Mullary
- Nicola Walker as D.C. Sue Upton
- Charles Daish as D.C.I. Thomas McCleish

== Episodes ==
#	Title	Directed by	Written by	Original release date	UK viewers (millions)
1	"Episode 1"	Chris Lang	Ed Bazalgette	3 September 2012	5.39
Rosie Cutler is a successful shopkeeper in the Suffolk resort town of Eastlee, and mother of teenagers Jamie and Olivia. Rosie is married to widower Ben Banks, who also has two children, Rob and Jess. After missing schoolgirl Lorraine Mullary is found stabbed, Rosie is appalled to find Jamie has hidden his blood-stained trainers under his bed - and somebody has used the washing machine secretly. Unwilling to share her suspicions with Ben, she confides in Jamie's father, ex-husband David. Together they agree that David should watch Jamie and what he gets up to after school. David discovers that Jamie is friendly with the older Sean Christie: a drop-out who, the previous year, had been arrested on suspicion of sexual assault.
2	"Episode 2"	Chris Lang	Ed Bazalgette	4 September 2012	4.99
Rosie finds herself growing more and more distanced from Ben and confiding more in David, though she eventually tells Ben her suspicions. Ben then finds the dead girl's mobile phone in Jamie's room. However when Rosie and Ben confront Jamie together, he explains that Lorraine dropped the mobile and he was going to return it to her; with this explanation Jamie persuades Rosie and Ben not to go to the police. Sean Christie is arrested, but later freed as he is found to have an alibi for the time of Lorraine's murder. With the family now torn apart, Ben moves out with his children. Rosie receives a call from Jamie, asking her to meet him on the beach. When she goes, alone, to meet him, Jamie tells her what really happened on that fateful night.

== Reception ==
Reviewing the series in The Guardian Sam Wollaston called it "tense, absorbing, thrilling". Nigel Farndale, writing in The Telegraph praised it as "a taut, psychological thriller that will have left every parent who watched it feeling uneasy, maybe even culpable," while Alex Hardy in The Times was impressed by "A striking portrait of the asymmetrical compartmentalised nature of one family of our times."
