= Parnell and the Englishwoman =

- Genre: Drama
- Written by: Hugh Leonard
- Directed by: John Bruce
- Starring: Trevor Eve; Francesca Annis; David Robb
- Country of origin: United Kingdom
- Original language: English
- No. of series: 1
- No. of episodes: 4

Production
- Producer: Terry Coles
- Production companies: BBC; Polymuse

Original release
- Network: BBC Two; RTÉ One
- Release: 9 January – 30 January 1991

Parnell and the Englishwoman is a British television miniseries which aired on BBC Two in four hour-long episodes from 9 to 30 January 1991, and RTÉ One from 10 to 31 January 1991. The story is based on an episode in the life of Irish politician Charles Stewart Parnell and is based on Hugh Leonard's historical novel of the same name. The series was also shown on Masterpiece Theatre in the United States.

The television miniseries was produced by the BBC and Polymuse. It stars Trevor Eve and Francesca Annis

== Plot summary ==
Irish politician Charles Parnell and Katharine O'Shea, wife of another politician Captain William O'Shea, begin an affair that lasts for many years. It eventually leads to his political downfall and the crumbling of the Irish party in Parliament.

== Cast ==
- Trevor Eve as Charles Stewart Parnell
- Francesca Annis as Katharine O'Shea
- David Robb as William O'Shea
- Lorcan Cranitch as Timothy Healy
- Sheila Ruskin as Anna Steele
- Shaughan Seymour as Joseph Chamberlain
- Robert Lang as Mr. Gladstone
- Stanley Townsend as Thomas Sexton

== Reception ==
Writing for The Los Angeles Times, Ray Loynd called the series "redolent of Victorian splendor, of soft green rolling fields and country and seaside manors. But coursing through that serene world is the hurly-burly of political intrigue and the unquenched passions of a secret affair that brought down the man often called "the uncrowned king of Ireland."" John O'Connor of the New York Times called it an "old-fashioned BBC drama. The pacing is almost stately, the sets and costumes are rich in period authenticity, the script is intelligent. Politics involving the Irish and the English are so convoluted that absolute clarity is probably impossible within the confines of a drama, but Mr. Leonard manages to touch on a remarkable number of crucial points. And the performances, predictably, are extraordinarily good, with Mr. Eve, Miss Annis and Mr. Robb setting a demanding pace for the fine supporting cast. It's comforting to find this sort of highly professional production still around these days."
