= Louis Ashbourne Serkis =

English actor (born 2004)

- Born: 19 June 2004 (age 22); England
- Occupation: Actor
- Years active: 2012–present
- Parents: Andy Serkis (father); Lorraine Ashbourne (mother)
- Relatives: Ruby Ashbourne Serkis (sister)

Louis Ashbourne Serkis (born 19 June 2004) is an English actor. He is best known for his role as Alex in the 2019 fantasy adventure film The Kid Who Would Be King.

== Early life and education ==
Ashbourne Serkis is the son of actor and director Andy Serkis and actress Lorraine Ashbourne with an older sister, Ruby, and an older brother Sonny.

He attended Highgate School.

== Career ==
Ashbourne Serkis began acting on television. In May 2016, he made his film debut portraying Young Hatter in Alice Through the Looking Glass. In July 2017, he portrayed Peter in the English version of Mary and the Witch's Flower, and also appeared in The Current War. In November 2018, he appeared as the wolf cub Bhoot in Mowgli: Legend of the Jungle, directed by and co-starring his father. In February 2019, he starred as Alex in The Kid Who Would Be King.

== Filmography ==
Key
†	Denotes works that have not yet been released

=== Film ===
Year	Title	Role	Notes
2012	The Hobbit: An Unexpected Journey	Cute Young Hobbit	Extended edition
2016	Alice Through the Looking Glass	Young Tarrant Hightopp	
2017	Mary and the Witch's Flower	Peter (voice)	English dub
2017	The Current War	Older Dash	
2018	Mowgli: Legend of the Jungle	Bhoot (voice)	Also motion capture
2019	The Kid Who Would Be King	Alex	
2022	Allelujah	Andy	
2023	Path to Ecstasy	Adam	Short film
2023	Arcade	Billy	Short film
2026	28 Years Later: The Bone Temple	Tom	
TBA	Desperate Journey †	Karl	Post-production

=== Television ===
Year	Title	Role	Notes
2014	Endeavour	Tommy Cork	Series 2; episode 4: "Neverland"
2016–2019	Noddy, Toyland Detective	Noddy	Series 1 and 2; 7 episodes
2017	Taboo	Robert	Episodes 1 and 4–8
2017	SS-GB	Douggie Archer	Mini-series; episodes 1, 2 and 4
2020	The Queen's Gambit	Georgi Girev	Mini-series; episode 4: "Middle Game"
2022	No Return	Noah Powell	Mini-series; episodes 1–4
2025	The Chelsea Detective	Stan Wilton	Series 3, Episode 3: "For the Greater Good"
2025	Out There	Johnny Williams	Mini-series; episodes 1–6
2025	Wild Cherry	Hugo	Episodes 1–2 and 4–5
