= The Last Breath (2024 film) =

- Theatrical release poster
- Directed by: Joachim Hedén
- Screenplay by: Andrew Prendergast; Nick Saltrese
- Produced by: Andrew Prendergast; Chris Reed
- Starring: Kim Spearman; Jack Parr; Alexander Arnold; Erin Mullen; Arlo Carter
- Cinematography: Eric Börjeson
- Edited by: Fredrik Morheden; Albin Simonsson
- Music by: Patrick Kirst
- Production companies: Orogen Entertainment; Metro International Entertainment; Picaro Films; Freebie Films; Umedia; Anamorphic Media; Business Finland; Filmgate Films; Malta Film Commission; Turku Business Region; uFund
- Distributed by: Nashe Kino; RLJE Films; A Contracorriente Films; EuroVideo; Phoenicia Pictures; Signature Entertainment; WW Entertainment
- Release date: June 12, 2024
- Running time: 96 minutes
- Countries: Canada; United Kingdom; Sweden; Belgium; Malta; Finland
- Language: English
- Box office: $528,804

The Last Breath (also known as Escape from the Deep) is a 2024 survival horror thriller film co- written by Andrew Prendergast, Nick Saltrese and directed by Joachim Hedén. It stars Kim Spearman, Jack Parr, Erin Mullen, Arlo Carter, Alexander Arnold and Julian Sands in his final film appearance. The film is about friends who dive amid a newly discovered shipwreck without knowing that they're not alone down there.

The film was released on June 12, 2024 in theaters, Blu-ray, DVD and VOD and received negative reviews from audience and critics.

== Plot ==
A group of old college friends reunite on a Caribbean scuba diving trip exploring the wreckage of a WWII battleship and find themselves trapped inside the underwater labyrinth of rusted metal surrounded by great white sharks.

== Cast ==
- Kim Spearman as Sam
- Jack Parr as Noah
- Alexander Arnold as Brett
- Erin Mullen as Riley
- Arlo Carter as Logan
- Julian Sands as Levi
- Maxime Durand as Brian
- Hayden Grech as Jimmy
- Noel Salblix as Submarine Crew
- William Erazo Fernández as Bar guest

== Production ==
September 2022, director Joachim Hedén began filming in Belgium on a shark attack thriller film The Last Breath. It was written by Nick Saltrese. The film cinematographer is Eric Börjeson and Ian Creed was the diving supervisor.

Metro International Entertainment was handling the film's worldwide sales and has presold it to some territories including California, Germany, Austria, Switzerland, France, Italy, Spain, Scandinavia, Portugal, eastern part of Europe, Voxell in the CIS, South Africa, Phoenicia Middle East, Joy N Cinema in South Korea and Edko in Hongkong. Principal photography was started on the second week of September 2022, at AED Studios in Antwerp, Belgium before moving to Malta on October. Andrew Prendergast of Picaro Films and Chris Reed of Freebie Films was set to produce the film. The production was financed by Orogen Entertainment, Anamorphic Media and Filmgate. UK Global Screen Fund helped to distribute the film internationally.

== Release ==
The films was theatrically released on June 12, 2024, and was released in Blu-ray, DVD and VOD on July 2024.

== Reception ==
On the review aggregator website Rotten Tomatoes, 30% of 27 critics' reviews are positive, with an average rating of 4.80/10.

Glenn Kenny of RogerEbert.com gave the film a 2 star out of 4 star rating and he said;

As goofy and unconvincing as it often is, “The Last Breath” is difficult to get exasperated over. It may go down easier still if you opt to see it in a very well-air-conditioned setting.

Rated "C" was given by Derek Sante of KSNV and he simply wrote;

A simplistic film that overextends.

Noah Berlatsky of Chicago Reader gave the film a positive feedback and he wrote;

Is it great art? No. Is it good art? Also no. But there is something satisfying about the blank, sleek, toothy justice of it.
