= Lorraine Ashbourne =

English actress (born 1961)

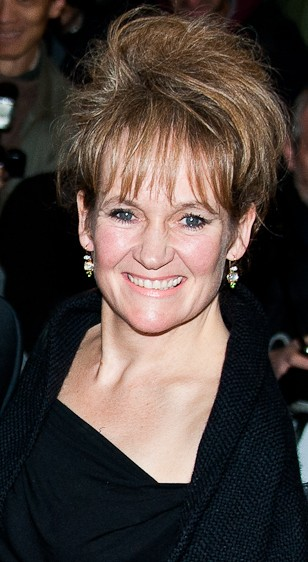
- Ashbourne in 2013
- Born: 7 January 1961 (age 65); Manchester, England
- Occupation: Actress
- Years active: 1987–present
- Spouse: Andy Serkis (m. 2002)
- Children: 3, including Ruby and Louis

Lorraine Ashbourne (born 7 January 1961) is an English actress.

== Early life and education ==
Ashbourne was born on 7 January 1961, in Manchester, England.

She attended Wilbraham High School, while living in Fallowfield. She joined Stretford Children's Theatre. She took part in the University of Manchester Stage Society and Manchester Youth Theatre. She joined the Webber Drama School in 1982.

== Career ==
Ashbourne has appeared on British series and television films, including: Playing the Field (1998), Unforgotten (2017), Grantchester (2017), Maigret in Montmartre (2017), Midsomer Murders (2018), The Street, and Jericho.

As a stage actor, Lorraine regularly appeared at the Royal Exchange Theatre in Manchester, portraying roles such as Kate Hardcastle in She Stoops to Conquer and Emilia in Othello, acting in both of these alongside her husband Andy Serkis.

In 2019, she portrayed Barbara Castle in The Crown (2019) and, from 2020, she starred as Mrs. Varley in Bridgerton. She played Joan Nuthall in Alma's Not Normal (2020), and was Daphne Sparrow in Sherwood (2022). She played Karen in I Hate Suzie (2024), and appeared in After the Flood (2024).

Ashbourne plays Jess in the comedy-drama series Riot Women (2025–).

== Personal life ==
In 1987, Ashbourne dated actor Glyn Pritchard, who played chef Paul on Crossroads.

She has been in a relationship with actor Andy Serkis since at least 1993, having toured together in a play at the Royal Exchange in 1989. Ashbourne married Serkis and they have three children, including actors Sonny, Ruby and Louis Ashbourne Serkis.

== Filmography ==
Key
†	Denotes works that have not yet been released

=== Film ===
Year	Title	Role	Ref.
1988	Distant Voices, Still Lives	Maisie Davies	
1988	The Dressmaker	Factory Girl	
1989	Resurrected	Reeva	
1995	Jack and Sarah	Jackie	
1997	Fever Pitch	Mrs. Ashworth	
2001	The Martins	Lil	
2005	King Kong	Theatre Actor #3	
2008	A Bunch of Amateurs	Jane Jarvis	
2010	Oranges and Sunshine	Nicky	
2010	Thorne: Scaredycat	Ruth Brigstocke	
2013	The Selfish Giant	Mary	
2015	Child 44	Anna	
2016	Adult Life Skills	Marion	
2017	Breathe	First Woman	
2019	Blinded by the Light	Kathy	
2019	The Corrupted	Pam Cullen	
2022	I Used to Be Famous	Cheryl	
2024	Hitpig!	Big Bertha (voice)	
2024	The Lord of the Rings: The War of the Rohirrim	Olwyn (voice)	

=== Television ===
Year	Title	Role	Notes	Ref.
1987	The Bill	Tracy	"Brownie Points"	
1987	Casualty	Sandy	"Cry for Help"	
1988	London's Burning	Sue	"1.2"	
1989	Boon	Judy	"Big Game Hunt"	
1990	The Bill	Maria	"Something Special"	
1991	Rich Tea and Sympathy	Karen Rudge	TV series	
1993	Mr. Wroe's Virgins	Anne	"Leah's Story"	
1993	Fighting for Gemma	Susan D'Arcy	TV film	
1994	The Bill	Jenny Longden	"He Who Waits"	
1994	In Suspicious Circumstances	Ann Bailey	"Absence of Mercy"	
1994	Casualty	Teresa England	"Relations"	
1994	Three Seven Eleven	Sylvia Powers	"2.2", "2.3"	
1995	Pie in the Sky	Maeve Cormack	"The Mild Bunch"	
1995	Chiller	Susan Taylor	"Number Six"	
1995	Peak Practice	Tina Greaves	"Life and Soul", "Other Lives"	
1996	The Bill	Shirley Briggs	"Too Close for Comfort"	
1998–2000	City Central	Sgt. Yvonne Mackey	Main role	
1998–2002	Playing the Field	Geraldine Powell	Main role	
2000	A Christmas Carol	Sue Cratchett	TV film	
2001	In a Land of Plenty	Edna	TV series	
2002	Clocking Off	Sally Preston	"Alan's Story"	
2003	Love Again	Betty Mackereth	TV film	
2003	The Eustace Bros.	Anna Goodman	"1.3"	
2006	Thin Ice	Eileen	TV miniseries	
2006	Jane Eyre	Mrs. Fairfax	TV miniseries	
2006	Housewife, 49	Dot	TV film	
2007	True Dare Kiss	Beth Sweeney	Main role	
2007	The Street	Cath Hanley	Episode: "Demolition", "Taxi"	
2009	Lark Rise to Candleford	Lilly Spicer	"Episode 2.3"	
2009	Law & Order: UK	Maureen Walters	Episode: "Care"	
2009	Murderland	Rachel	TV miniseries	
2009	Victoria Wood's Mid Life Christmas	Catheter Finch	TV film	
2010	Moving On	Treena	Episode: "I am Darleen Fyles"	
2010	Thorne	Ruth Brigstocke	Episode: "Sleepyhead", "Scaredycat"	
2010	Little Crackers	Miss Meadowcroft	"Victoria Wood's Little Cracker: The Giddy Kipper"	
2011	Coming Up	Linda	Episode: "Rough Skin"	
2012	New Tricks	Moira Wright	Episode: "Body of Evidence"	
2012	Public Enemies	Marion Sharmer	TV miniseries	
2012	The Syndicate	June Juniper	"Episode 1.3"	
2012	Homefront	Cheryl Davies	TV miniseries	
2014	Silent Witness	DI Rachel Klein	"Coup de Grace: Parts 1 & 2"	
2015	Inside No. 9	Carol	Episode: "Nana's Party"	
2015	The Interceptor	Valerie	Main role	
2015	New Tricks	Vicky Collins	Episode: "The Crazy Gang"	
2015	London Spy	Mrs. Turner	TV miniseries	
2016	Jericho	Lace Polly	Main role	
2017	Unforgotten	DI Tessa Nixon	Main role (Series 2)	
2017	Grantchester	Cora Maguire	"3.5"	
2017	Maigret in Montmartre	Rosa Alfonsi	TV film	
2018	Midsomer Murders	Daniella Bellini	"Send in the Clowns"	
2019	The Crown	Barbara Castle	6 episodes	
2020–present	Bridgerton	Mrs. Varley	Regular role	
2020–2024	Alma's Not Normal	Joan Nuthall	12 episodes	
2022–present	Sherwood	Daphne Sparrow	12 episodes	
2022–2024	I Hate Suzie	Karen	4 episodes	
2024–2026	After the Flood	Molly Marshall	12 episodes	
2025–present	Riot Women	Jess	6 episodes	

== Stage work ==
Ashbourne's roles in the theatre include:

- Miss Kate Hardcastle, She Stoops to Conquer by Oliver Goldsmith at the Royal Exchange, Manchester (1990)
- She's in Your Hands by Georges Feydeau at the Royal Exchange, Manchester (1990)
- Jean, Your Home in the West by Rod Wooden at the Royal Exchange, Manchester (1991)
- Crystal, Doctor Heart by Peter Muller at the Royal Exchange, Manchester (1991)
- Rhoda Nunn, The Odd Women by Michael Meyer at the Royal Exchange, Manchester (1992)
- Grushenka,The Brothers Karamazov at the Royal Exchange, Manchester (1993)
- The Kitchen by Arnold Wesker at the Royal Court Theatre, London (1994)
- Viv, Babies by Jonathon Harvey at the Royal Court Theatre, London (1994)
- Jocasta, The Phoenician Women by Euripides for the Royal Shakespeare Company (1995)
- Miss Hoyden, The Relapse by John Vanburgh for the Royal Shakespeare Company (1995)
- May, Fool For Love by Sam Shepherd at the Donmar Warehouse, London (1996)
- Emilia, Othello at the Royal Exchange, Manchester (2002)
- Olga, The Three Sisters by Anton Chekhov at the National Theatre, London (2003)
- Aunt Dan, Aunt Dan and Lemon by Wallace Shawn at the Royal Court Theatre, London (2009)
- Aunty Carol, Till the Stars Come Down by Beth Steel at the National Theatre, London (2024)
