= Unforgotten =

British crime drama series (2015–present)

- Series 1 DVD cover
- Genre: Crime drama
- Created by: Chris Lang
- Written by: Chris Lang
- Directed by: Andy Wilson
- Starring: Nicola Walker; Sanjeev Bhaskar; Sinéad Keenan; Peter Egan; Lewis Reeves; Pippa Nixon; Carolina Main
- Opening theme: "All We Do" by Oh Wonder
- Composer: Michael Price
- Country of origin: United Kingdom
- Original language: English
- No. of series: 6
- No. of episodes: 36

Production
- Executive producers: Sally Haynes; Chris Lang; Laura Mackie
- Producer: Tim Bradley
- Editor: Adam Trotman
- Running time: 45 minutes
- Production company: Mainstreet Pictures

Original release
- Network: ITV
- Release: 8 October 2015 – present

Unforgotten is a British crime drama television series, which initially aired on ITV on 8 October 2015. It was created and written by Chris Lang and directed by Andy Wilson. The programme follows a team of London detectives led by DCI Cassie Stuart (Nicola Walker) (Series 1–4), DCI Jessie James (Sinéad Keenan) (Series 5–6) and DI Sunny Khan (Sanjeev Bhaskar) as they solve cold cases of disappearance and murder.

Each series consists of six episodes. Series 1 to 4 were broadcast in the UK in 2015, 2017, 2018 and 2021. For Series 5, which premiered on ITV in February 2023, Sinéad Keenan replaced Walker as Bhaskar's new partner, DCI Jessica "Jessie" James. Series 6 aired starting 9 February 2025. In February 2025, ITV renewed the crime drama for a seventh series.

Each series deals with a new case, introducing seemingly unconnected characters who are gradually revealed to have some relationship with the victim. As the murder mystery unfolds, the emotional ramifications of the crime on the lives of those affected are also explored.

Unforgotten has received critical acclaim. Tom Courtenay won the 2016 BAFTA TV Award for Best Supporting Actor for the first series and Mark Bonnar won the 2017 BAFTA Scotland for Best Actor in Television for the second series.

== Plot ==
Series 1 to 4 include the story of DCI Cassie Stuart's personal life: of the typical but growing conflicts in her immediate family, of her spartan arms-length relationships with individuals who like her, of her drive to solve cases and of her coping both successfully and unsuccessfully with the relentless strain of her job. During the historical cold cases, Cassie verbalizes her driving motives: find the truth of what happened, provide closure to the living and possibly bring a criminal to justice. An inner motive surfaces when she says she hopes solving a current case will help "... [me] move on... If we can do this right, if we can ignore who they are and do it by the book, then all the questions [and faces] might all go away. And I might be able to sleep at night."

Series 1 focuses on the murder of James "Jimmy" Sullivan (Harley Alexander-Sule), a 17-year-old who disappeared in 1976. His remains are discovered during the demolition of a house in north London.

Series 2 follows the murder of David Walker (Daniel Gosling), a Conservative Party consultant who went missing in 1990. His saponified remains are found in a suitcase in the River Lea in north-east London.

Series 3 investigates the murder of schoolgirl Hayley Reid (Bronagh Waugh), who disappeared from a seaside resort town on New Year's Eve 1999. Her skeleton is discovered by workmen repairing the central reservation of the M1 motorway in London.

Series 4 follows the discovery in 2020 of Matthew Walsh's headless and handless corpse, found inside an old freezer removed during a house clearance in north London. His body had apparently been frozen since his disappearance in 1990 when he encountered five police trainees celebrating their Passing Out from the academy.

Series 5 investigates the murder of Precious Falade, whose body is found in the chimney of a house undergoing renovation. While DCI James tries to deal with the revelation that her husband has been having an affair with her sister, she and the team assemble the circumstances surrounding the death, including the troubled lives of the dead woman's mother, son and key social worker.

Series 6 follows the discovery of body parts belonging to a man called Gerry Cooper, in a London marsh. DCI James resumes contact with her sister, but finds it difficult. Sunny and pathologist Leanne Balcombe begin dating.

== Cast ==
- Nicola Walker as DCI Cassandra 'Cassie' Stuart (series 1–4)
- Sanjeev Bhaskar as DI Sunil 'Sunny' Khan (Note: Listed in the credits in the first three series as DS and sometimes also referred to as such in dialogue; more commonly referred to in dialogue as DI and, in series 3, this rank is shown on his warrant card.)
- Sinéad Keenan as DCI Jessica 'Jessie' James (series 5–present)
- Jordan Long as DS Murray Boulting
- Lewis Reeves as DC Jake Collier (series 1–4)
- Pippa Nixon as DC Karen 'Kaz' Willetts (series 1, 4–present)
- Peter Egan as Martin Hughes, DCI Stuart's father (series 1–4)
- Jassa Ahluwalia as Adam Stuart, DCI Stuart's son (series 1–4)
- Colin R. Campbell as DSI Clive Andrews, DCI Stuart's boss
- Carolina Main as DC Fran Lingley (series 2–present) (Note: Credited as DS in series 4, but still referred to as DC in dialogue.)
- Alastair MacKenzie as ex-DCI John Bentley and later Cassie's partner (series 3–4)
- Georgia Mackenzie as Leanne Balcombe, pathologist (series 3–present)
- Michelle Bonnard as Sally Fields, Sunny's partner (series 3–5)
- Janet Dibley as Jenny, Martin's partner (series 3–4)
- Andrew Lancel as Steve James, DCI James’ husband (series 5–present)
- Kate Robbins as Kate, DCI James’ mother (series 5–present)

=== Series 1 (2015) cast ===
- Tom Courtenay as Eric Slater
- Trevor Eve as Sir Phillip Cross
- Bernard Hill as Father Robert Greaves
- Ruth Sheen as Lizzie Wilton
- Gemma Jones as Claire Slater
- Cherie Lunghi as Shirley Cross
- Hannah Gordon as Grace Greaves
- Brian Bovell as Ray Wilton
- Frances Tomelty as Maureen Sullivan
- Claire Goose as Ellie Greaves
- Zoe Telford as Bella Cross
- Tamzin Malleson as Caroline Greaves
- Dominic Power as Les Slater
- Tom Austen as Josh Cross
- Adam Astill as Matt Slater
- Jonathan Harden as Sean Rawlins
- Tessa Peake-Jones as Sheila
- Harley Alexander-Sule as Jimmy Sullivan
- Silas Carson as Marcus Archer
- David Troughton as the bishop, Geoff
- Matthew Cottle as Liam Gough
- John Salthouse as ex-DCI Kendrick
- Dannie Pye as Vincent Erskine
- Ade Oyefeso as Curtis Salgado
- Yasmine Akram as Kelly
- Dominic Coleman as John Burton
- Sharon Duncan Brewster as CPS Lawyer Harding

=== Series 2 (2017) cast ===
- Lorraine Ashbourne as DI Tessa Nixon
- Mark Bonnar as Colin Osborne
- Rosie Cavaliero as Marion Kelsey
- Badria Timimi as Sara Mahmoud
- Adeel Akhtar as Hassan Mahmoud
- Charlie Condou as Simon Osborne
- Douglas Hodge as Paul Nixon
- Nigel Lindsay as Tony Kelsey
- Holly Aird as Elise Dunphy
- Wendy Craig as Joy Dunphy
- Emma Cunniffe as Janet
- Bryony Hannah as Cath
- Will Brown as Jason Walker
- Daniel Gosling as David Walker
- Katherine Jakeways as Nicola
- Josef Altin as Tyler Da Silva
- Nathalie Armin as DSI Kuldip Gill
- Mika Simmons as Chambers
- Maggie O'Neill as Ellen Price
- Mairead McKinley as Sinead Quinn
- Bill Paterson as Harry Osborne
- Louiza Patikas as Amy East

=== Series 3 (2018) cast ===
- James Fleet as Chris Lowe
- Alex Jennings as Tim Finch
- Kevin McNally as James Hollis
- Neil Morrissey as Pete Carr
- Sasha Behar as Jamila Faruk
- Emma Fielding as Amy Hollis
- Indra Ové as Maria Carr
- Amanda Root as Carol Finch
- Sara Stewart as Mel Hollis
- Bronagh Waugh as Jessica Reid
- Brid Brennan as Suzanne Reid
- Finlay Robertson as Mark Harper
- Tom Rhys Harries as Eliot Hollis
- Siobhan Redmond as Derran Finch
- Tori Allen-Martin as Sandra Rayworth
- Lucinda Dryzek as Claire Finch
- Jo Herbert as Emma Finch
- Gabrielle Glaister as Alison Pinion
- Sara Powell as The Arbiter
- Ash Rizi as Dr. Walsh
- Liran Nathan as Raheem
- Gerald Kyd as Adrian Mullery
- Samira Ahmed as herself interviewing Mel Hollis (Episode 4)

=== Series 4 (2021) cast ===
- Susan Lynch as DCC Liz Baildon
- Andy Nyman as Dean Barton
- Phaldut Sharma as DCI Ram Sidhu
- Liz White as Fiona Grayson
- Sheila Hancock as Eileen Baildon
- Lucy Speed as Marnie Barton
- Clare Calbraith as Anna Sidhu
- Daniel Flynn as Geoff Tomlinson
- Alec Newman as Mark Tomlinson
- Ronny Jhutti as Bal Sidhu
- Indira Joshi as Riya Sidhu
- James Craze as Matthew and Jerome Walsh
- Denise Black as DCI June Marshall
- Kate Williams as Mary Quinn
- Charles Dale as Chief Constable Robin
- Amanda Douge as Janet
- Mina Andala as Eugenia Castillo
- David Schofield as Clive Walsh
- Ian Burfield as Ian Henderson
- Elizabeth Counsell as Suzie Montgomery

=== Series 5 (2023) cast ===
- Ian McElhinney as Lord Anthony Hume
- Hayley Mills as Lady Emma Hume
- Martina Laird as Ebele Falade
- Mark Frost as Dave Adams
- Max Rinehart as Karol Wojski
- Rhys Yates as Jay (Joseph) Royce
- Hebe Beardsall as Cheryl
- Andrew Lancel as Steve James
- Mark Oosterveen as Graham Saville
- Hayley Tamaddon as Judy Mexbury

=== Series 6 (2025) cast ===
- MyAnna Buring as Melinda Ricci
- Pixie Davies as Taylor Cooper
- Michele Dotrice as Dot Baines
- Elham Ehsas as Asif Syed
- Maximilian Fairley as Martin 'Marty' Baines
- Victoria Hamilton as Juliet Cooper
- Ahmad Sakhi as Hassan
- Adrian Rawlins as Paul Merrick
- Emmett Scanlan as Patrick
- Oliver Lansley as Gabriel
- Lisa Davina Phillip as Doreen
- Louis Dempsey as Joseph Kane
- David Witts as Sam
- Phaldut Sharma as Ram Sidhu
- Damien Molony as Father Luke Ryan

== Production ==
The series was originally developed, by Lang, as a serial titled 27 Arlington Crescent. Filming for the first series began in March 2015 and lasted for twelve weeks. Locations included Liverpool, the London suburbs, Kingston upon Thames, the Essex coast, Westminster and the Fens.

After the unexpected success of the initial series, ITV commissioned a second series, with Lang returning as writer and Wilson as director. It was shot on location by the River Lea, in the Cotswolds, and along the promenade in Brighton.

A third series order was announced on 2 March 2017, following strong viewing figures. Scenes were set in Lymington, Hampshire (which substituted for the fictional Middenham and its estuary), Uxbridge, Middlesex, Amersham in Buckinghamshire, Clifton in Bristol, Ealing in West London, and King's Lynn and Hunstanton in Norfolk. An empty mansion at Bulstrode Park near Gerrards Cross, Buckinghamshire provided the setting for the police station and lab. Only seven weeks after filming wrapped, the third series began broadcasting in the UK on 15 July 2018.

A fourth series was scheduled to be made in autumn 2019; however, ITV only confirmed in January 2020 that filming had commenced, with the planned broadcasting timeframe having been delayed. In September 2020, it was announced that filming had recommenced and the series planned on being screened in 2021, with actors Walker, Bhaskar, Reeves and Egan all reprising their roles. The new series eventually began screening in February 2021.

Filming for the fifth series began on 14 March 2022, with the airing of the series beginning on 27 February 2023.

In April 2023, ITV renewed the crime drama for a sixth series, which was launched on ITV1 on 9 February 2025.

The opening and closing credits are accompanied by the song "All We Do", written and performed by the English duo Oh Wonder (Ant West and Josephine Vander Gucht).

== Episodes ==
=== Series overview ===
Series	Episodes	Originally released		Avg UK viewership (millions)
Series	Episodes	First released	Last released	Avg UK viewership (millions)
1	6	8 October 2015	12 November 2015	6.44
2	6	5 January 2017	9 February 2017	6.91
3	6	15 July 2018	19 August 2018	6.85
4	6	22 February 2021	29 March 2021	9.49
5	6	27 February 2023	3 April 2023	8.25
6	6	9 February 2025	24 February 2025	7.64
7	TBA	TBA	TBA	TBA

=== Series 1 (2015) ===
No. overall	No. in series	Title	Directed by	Written by	Original release date	UK viewers (millions)
1	1	"Episode 1"	Andy Wilson	Chris Lang	8 October 2015	7.35
A skeleton found in the cellar of a building being demolished prompts an investigation from DCI Cassie Stuart and her colleague DI Sunny Khan into the death of a young man that could potentially date back more than one hundred years. Discovery of a car key near the body not only dates it to within the last 65 years but also leads them on a trail that could help identify the victim. At the end of the trail is a diary belonging to Jimmy Sullivan, a young man missing since 1976, who appears to be the victim. The final pages of the diary contain several names and phone numbers: amongst them are Beth, Father Rob, Frankie C and Mr Slater, four seemingly unconnected people living separate lives. It is now down to Cassie and Sunny to find out what happened to Jimmy and to finally get him home.
2	2	"Episode 2"	Andy Wilson	Chris Lang	15 October 2015	6.41
Cassie travels to Liverpool to see Jimmy's mother, Maureen, and get a sense of who Jimmy was, as well as a DNA sample to confirm his identity. She meets a woman who is relieved that she might find out what happened to her son 39 years after he went missing. With confirmation that the body in the cellar is Jimmy Sullivan, the search for his murderer begins. The team starts by identifying the names featured in Jimmy's diary. 'Frankie C' is Sir Phillip Cross, the government's recently appointed entrepreneurial czar, who emphatically denies ever having met Jimmy. 'Beth' is identified as Lizzie Wilton, now living in Croydon and married to Ray, a second-generation Jamaican man. Lizzie also denies remembering Jimmy but is clearly a different person from who she was in the mid 1970s, when she was a skinhead member of a racist organization. 'Father Rob' is Robert Greaves, who at the time of Jimmy's death, was working in the local church close to the building where Jimmy's body was found, then a hostel called Arlingham House where Jimmy was living. 'Mr Slater' is Eric Slater, a wheelchair user and a retired bookkeeper living in Cambridgeshire with his wife Claire, who has dementia .
3	3	"Episode 3"	Andy Wilson	Chris Lang	22 October 2015	6.29
The investigation into Jimmy's death continues. Cassie and Sunny visit Father Robert Greaves, who remembers Jimmy fondly. He says he cannot identify the mysterious 'JoJo', who gave Jimmy the diary. However, he previously was seen leaving a phone message for JoJo and clearly reacts to hearing her name. Lizzy admits her racist past to Ray, but maintains that she did not know Jimmy. Sir Phillip tells his daughter Bella, a lawyer, of his questioning and admits knowing Jimmy and having done work for the Fenwick crime family. Cassie and Sunny meet Eric Slater, the former bookkeeper to Arlingham House, who remembers Jimmy well. He also remembers JoJo and says he found her having sex with Father Robert at the hostel. When Cassie and Sunny revisit Father Robert, he admits the relationship with JoJo, but says he was not aware of her also seeing Jimmy. He denies being in touch with her in recent years. When a tabloid paper gets the story of Sir Phillip's work for the Fenwicks, it puts both his business and political careers in jeopardy.
4	4	"Episode 4"	Andy Wilson	Chris Lang	29 October 2015	6.61
The forensic team discovers marks on Jimmy's bones consistent with known gangland torture methods. With this in mind, Cassie and Sunny question Sir Phillip about his involvement with the Fenwick family. Did the he or any of the shady associates of his youth have anything to do with Jimmy's disappearance or murder? Eric Slater's only previous contact with the police was an altercation outside a pub a year before Jimmy's death. Eric says he and the other man were drunk and fighting over their football teams. But when the sister of the other man, now deceased, is interviewed, she insists that Eric waited for her brother outside a gay pub and violently attacked him. Phone records lead to the identification of JoJo as Joanna Bridges, who admits having relationships with both Jimmy and Father Robert. Based on information from someone who knew the residents of Arlingham House, Lizzie is brought in for questioning. She admits she and her then-boyfriend attacked and robbed Jimmy, but claims that neither were involved in the murder. Ray returns home to find Lizzie gone, "racist scum" spray painted on the house, broken glass where a brick was thrown through a window, and a note with the word "Sorry" on it. On their way back to the station Cassie and Sunny are notified that there may be a second murder victim.
5	5	"Episode 5"	Andy Wilson	Chris Lang	5 November 2015	5.95
Based on a phone call to the station from Les Slater and his mother Claire, Cassie and Sunny gatecrash the Slaters' 45th anniversary party and begin searching for a second body. After extensive search they find one buried on the property, as Claire said it would be. Eric Slater is arrested but denies any knowledge of the body or involvement in Jimmy's murder. The second victim is identified as Nicholas Whitmore, who disappeared in 1978. After some initial reluctance, Curtis – a young man on Ray's football team who Lizzie was encouraging in his academic pursuits – agrees to help Ray search for Lizzie. Father Robert confesses to his family and then to the police that he stole money from the church and the community center, that JoJo became pregnant from their affair, and he has been using the money to support his illegitimate child. Before the news breaks of Eric Slater's arrest, Sir Phillip Cross had made a deal with his son's Turkish contacts, and before he is able to stop it, Gordon Fenwick is killed in a house fire, made to look like an accident. Evidence found in Eric Slater's home links him to the last known whereabouts of the Nick Whitmore, a gay bar, and following the revelation that Jimmy had been selling himself for sex to repay the debt he owed to the Fenwicks, Cassie and Sunny finally realise that the connection between both murders may be Eric Slater's hidden hatred for homosexuals. Despite his denials, Eric is charged with both murders.
6	6	"Episode 6"	Andy Wilson	Chris Lang	12 November 2015	6.01
Father Robert's daughter Caroline goes into premature labour but, when he asks if it might have been caused by the stress of his revelations, he is told that the doctors have ruled that out. Bella and Josh Cross deliberate over the best way to deal with their father's criminality. Eric asks to talk with Cassie, saying he can tell her who committed the murders. However, he asks to be moved to another prison, and to see a doctor, before he will tell her. Sir Phillip's Turkish contact asks for £2 million to keep the arsonist, who has been arrested, from revealing Cross's name. Roy and Curtis keep searching for Lizzie until they are told she jumped into the river, after which a passerby pulled her out, and she was hospitalized. After being told his requests will be honoured, Eric tells Cassie and Sunny that Claire committed the murders. He admits to being attracted to men, and to having physical relationships with both Jimmy and Nicholas. Claire, who appears to have suffered from postpartum psychosis, attacked and killed the young men after finding each of them with her husband. Two weeks after Nicholas's death, Eric drove his car into a tree, resulting in his paraplegia. Josh Cross turns his father in, and Sir Phillip admits to paying for the death of Gordon Fenwick. Lizzie is released from the hospital, returns home with Roy, and is welcomed back by Curtis and the other members of Roy's football team. Since Claire's dementia makes her unfit to be tried, she is admitted to a care facility. Sir Phillip dies by hanging in his jail cell. With the identity of her son's killer revealed, Maureen is finally able to lay Jimmy to rest.

Episodes 1–5's ratings are based on 28-day data from BARB for ITV and ITV+1 and 7-day data for ITV HD. Episode 6's ratings are based on 28-day data from BARB for ITV, ITV+1 and ITV HD.

=== Series 2 (2017) ===
No. overall	No. in series	Title	Directed by	Written by	Original release date	UK viewers (millions)
7	1	"Episode 1"	Andy Wilson	Chris Lang	5 January 2017	7.29
Workers dredging the River Lea in London discover a body in a suitcase that may have been in the water for a long time. Cassie and Sunny are assigned the case and try to identify the victim through his watch and pager. Meanwhile, in Brighton, criminal barrister Colin Osborne (Mark Bonnar) and his husband, Simon (Charlie Condou), are adopting a six-year old girl, Flora. Colin is being blackmailed by Tyler, the partner of the girl's birth mother, who witnessed him keying the car of a homophobe. In London, Marion Kelsey (Rosie Cavaliero) works as a nurse on a children's cancer ward and is struggling to balance supporting her patients, her marriage and dealing with her family. In Salisbury, teacher Sara Mahmoud (Badira Timini) attends an interview for a headmistress position. In the Cotswolds, Jason Walker who struggles to maintain relationships with women, is visited on his birthday by his mother Tessa Nixon (Lorraine Ashbourne), a detective inspector in Oxford. Sunny identifies the watch's owner as David Walker, who disappeared in May 1990. Cassie and Sunny notify Tessa, who is his widow and has remarried.
8	2	"Episode 2"	Andy Wilson	Chris Lang	12 January 2017	7.08
As the investigation into David Walker's murder continues, the team try to decipher a series of messages found on the victim's pager. One message appears to be an address in King's Cross, which is discovered to have been a brothel at the time of Walker's death. Cassie and Sunny interrogate Sara Mahmoud, who was found to have worked as a prostitute from that address at the time. She denies knowing Walker, although she admits he could have been a client, and claims that she was living in Italy at the time of his murder. A telephone number in the victim's diary, found among evidence collected at the time of his disappearance, leads Cassie and Sunny to Colin Osborne, who also denies ever having known Walker. Colin tells his husband Simon about the blackmail and continues to feel pressure from Tyler. Marion becomes very upset when her supervisor tells her to discontinue personal phone calls with Zoe, one of the patients she cares for. Walker's best friend tells DC Fran that David had been sexually abused as a child.
9	3	"Episode 3"	Andy Wilson	Chris Lang	19 January 2017	7.04
The discovery that Walker was sexually abused when in primary school leads the team to suspect that the perpetrator, if still alive, would be in his early 80s. Sunny interviews Walker's best friend, James Gregory (Richard Hope), who claims that in the days leading up to his death, Walker confronted the abuser, who denied any such abuse. He also thinks Walker's experience was behind his affairs and substance abuse. Tessa Nixon's boss, Detective Superintendent Gill (Nathalie Armin), asks her to take restricted duties while the investigation takes its course, which she refuses to do, as she has not been named as a suspect in her husband's death. Cassie visits the address found on the back of a card from Walker's desk, where she interviews Marion's mother and sister, Joy and Elise. They claim that Marion was the only one living at the house at the time of Walker's death and would be the only person to have given out the address. Checks on Marion's history reveal she was arrested in 1988 for assaulting a police officer during a protest march and that she was living at an address with a known IRA conspirator. Meanwhile, Sara is forced to tell her husband, Hassan, about her past life, and Colin reveals to Cassie and Sunny that he had a mental breakdown and was sectioned just days before Walker disappeared.
10	4	"Episode 4"	Andy Wilson	Chris Lang	26 January 2017	6.52
Sara's life begins to fall apart when her youngest son overhears details from her secret past and shares the information with a friend, who passes it on. Meanwhile, DC Murray is told that Colin was sacked from his City job in 1989 for sexually assaulting a female temporary worker during an office party, but Cassie believes that he was framed. Flora's birth mother encounters Colin and demands an additional blackmail payment. When he storms off, leaving his phone behind, she pockets it. Meanwhile, Marion is suspended from work after her patient Zoe absconds from her parents' care. As the investigation into Walker's past continues, DS Jake receives an allegation that Walker sexually abused a 12-year-old girl, and Sunny discovers that he was heavily into S&M and sexually attacked at least one of his sexual partners. Concerns that his private fantasies spilled over into his charity work are confirmed when Ellen Price, a resident at a care home where he volunteered, comes forward to tell that Walker interfered with her and other children at the home. Some children were taken to 'parties' featuring drink, drugs and further sexual abuse. Tyler increases his blackmail demands on Colin, leading Simon to make a drastic decision. Tessa's second husband Paul fears that Jason may have inherited his father's tendencies and leaves with his 15-year-old daughter.
11	5	"Episode 5"	Andy Wilson	Chris Lang	2 February 2017	6.77
Colin is shocked to discover that the rape allegation made against him was concocted by David Walker, who paid the supposed victim £5,000 to get him drunk and then give a false story. Ellen Price shows Cassie the location where Walker and his friends used to hold 'parties'. Tessa's denying knowledge of David's activities is called into question when Ellen recalls a woman she believed to be Walker's wife turning up outside the house and having a 'screaming' row with him before taking Ellen back to her care home. When shown photos of Marion, Sara and Colin as teens, Ellen thinks she recognize Sara from one of the parties. As Marion's home life continues to spiral, she tries to make things up with Zoe, who has been found and is back at the hospital. While Sara denies every possibility put to her by Cassie, her estranged father - who she had claimed was dead - turns up without warning and gives her husband a completely different picture of Sara's life, leading to her leaving home at age 13. Sara's husband uncovers evidence which confirms she was in Italy at the time of the murder. Simon makes the heartbreaking decision to pause the adoption unless Colin can convince Tyler to back off. With the three possible suspects having either solid alibis or unclear motives for Walker's death, Cassie and Sunny are stumped as to who the killer might be until Cassie has an idea that could mean there are more victims.
12	6	"Episode 6"	Andy Wilson	Chris Lang	9 February 2017	6.77
Cassie and Sunny try to assemble the pieces and discover who actually killed David Walker 25 years earlier. Though Sara has provided reliable evidence that she was in Italy when the murder took place, Cassie suspects it was put together by someone who knew that one day she would need an alibi. The team wonder whether the case is part of a wider revenge plan. The notion is that each one killed the abuser of another, not their own abuser. Cassie travels to Scotland to talk with Colin's father, who describes how his son's behavior changed when he was about 9. She finds that the leader of a scout-type group to which Colin belonged was later imprisoned for assaulting boys in another group. That man had disappeared while sailing and was thought to have killed himself. When Sunny talks to Marion's sister and mother, he learns that Marion had told her mother about being abused by her father from the age of 12 but was not believed. Marion's father ended up hanging himself. A review of health service records reveals that Colin and Sara were both inpatients in the psychiatric ward of a London hospital and that Marion lived in the same neighborhood at that time, suggesting that they all may have known each other. Cassie follows Marion, who appears to have reconciled with her sister, to a pub and finds her in the back room with Colin and Sara. Cassie speaks alone with Colin, who tells her the details of his abuse at the hands of the group leader she had previously identified and how the experience changed him forever. He tells her that "what happened to Sara and Marion was much worse." Each of the three return home and tell their spouses of their abuse. Cassie consults with Sunny and decides that, as all three have suffered all their lives and work in jobs of high value to society, there seems to be no value in pursuing prison for them. There is also insufficient data for a solid court case, especially as one of the bodies was never found and the other death has been recorded as suicide.

=== Series 3 (2018) ===
No. overall	No. in series	Title	Directed by	Written by	Original release date	UK viewers (millions)
13	1	"Episode 1"	Andy Wilson	Chris Lang	15 July 2018	6.80
When workmen carrying out carriageway repairs on M1 uncover human remains in the central reservation, Cassie and the team investigate. Despite suspicions the remains could be archaeological, forensic analysis reveals the victim was a young female who could not have been buried before 1991. The only clue is a titanium surgical plate that appears foreign and has no serial number. Sunny identifies the plate as having been manufactured by a Greek Cypriot company in the mid-1990s, and working on the assumption that the victim may have broken her wrist on holiday, the team begin to trawl through hundreds of missing persons files in the hope of finding an identity. They discover Hayley Reid, a 16-year-old who disappeared on New Year's Day in 2000, and her twin sister, Jessica, confirms she broke her wrist while on holiday in Cyprus in 1995 and had a plate inserted.
14	2	"Episode 2"	Andy Wilson	Chris Lang	22 July 2018	6.64
Cassie and Sunny visit Hayley's family in Middenham, Hampshire, and break the news that it appears Hayley was strangled. Jessica warns Cassie that reopening the investigation could potentially bring a swarm of negative press back to the town, which wiped out the town's tourism trade for years after Hayley's disappearance. Cassie and Sunny meet with former local DCI John Bentley, second in command for the original investigation into Hayley's disappearance, who describes his regret that the police initially dismissed Hayley as a runaway. The police had investigated Hayley's boyfriend, Adrian Mullery, but he was never charged. After DNA confirms the remains were Hayley, one of her friends informs Cassie and Sunny that two days before her disappearance, Hayley subbed for her cleaning a holiday rental. This information aligns with Cassie's theory that the killer could have been a Londoner staying in a holiday rental. News of the discovery reaches four potential suspects in the investigation. Cassie and Sunny go to see Jamie Hollis, who hosts a television quiz show and organized rental of the house Hayley cleaned. He declines to speak to them without his lawyer and calls his son Eliot after the police leave. Clearly shaken, he tells Eliot "They’ve come – the police – about her.”
15	3	"Episode 3"	Andy Wilson	Chris Lang	29 July 2018	6.74
Cassie and Sunny learn from Jamie that he and three friends shared the holiday rental with their families before the New Year and that they spent a quiet New Year's Eve at the house before leaving on 2 January. The detectives note the friends attended school close to where Hayley was buried, and three who were married at the time divorced shortly afterward. All four are troubled: Jamie is struggling to deal with his ex-wife and with his son Eliot, who is addicted to drugs and has gender dysphoria; artist Chris Lowe has bipolar disorder and lives in a van off-the-grid; Pete Carr is a failed salesman who attempted to steal money from a client; and GP Tim Finch was recently investigated for verbally abusing an elderly patient. Pete sees the circumstances as a solution to his financial problems and tells the police he saw Hayley cleaning the rental house. He claims he knew nothing of her disappearance, as he had returned to Hong Kong, where he was living at the time, shortly after. The rest of the team look at timelines and leads from the original investigation, including a burglary at a local church and a report of a black car driving erratically. In contrast to Jamie's description, his ex-wife Melissa reveals that the New Year's Eve at the holiday rental was "a train wreck." All the adults were drinking, some of the men were using cocaine, and Chris had a mental breakdown and ran out into the rain. While Jamie and Tim went out after him – Pete previously had gone out to a pub – all four men were back by midnight. While it had been believed that Hayley did not leave her job at a local pub until around 12:10, DI Fran finds the that last confirmed sighting of Hayley was actually around 11, meaning that she could have encountered one or more of the men from the holiday rental.
16	4	"Episode 4"	Andy Wilson	Chris Lang	5 August 2018	6.84
The detectives investigate why the four men not only lied about staying in on New Year's Eve 1999 but also colluded in that lie. Jamie is besieged by journalists after a blogger, Sandra Rayworth, exposes his connection to the Hayley case. Pete, who served time in a Hong Kong prison for defrauding a disability charity, admits to the church robbery after DNA evidence ties him to the scene. Tim's ex-wife, Derran, says he is a controlling and manipulative man, who abused her physically, mentally and sexually. Chris's daughter says her parents' marriage and his business were destroyed because he was arrested for child porn, but police cannot find any record of this. Melissa, now an author, gives an interview discussing her experience as the wife of a perpetually unfaithful man, resulting in multiple emails from women who had sexual liaisons with Jamie, one who mentions his liking rape fantasies. Pete tries to blackmail Jamie, saying he "knows things" about Jamie's son the night of Hayley's murder. Police investigate Eliot after discovering he had already been arrested several times, including for stealing his father's car. After Cassie accidentally leaves his file in a café and his past is exposed online, Pete is stabbed by an unknown assailant.
17	5	"Episode 5"	Andy Wilson	Chris Lang	12 August 2018	6.81
After barely surviving the stabbing, Pete dies of a heart attack, putting Cassie's career in jeopardy. Tim tells the police that prior to the attack, Pete told him that on New Year's Eve 1999, he saw Eliot sneaking into the house after 2 am. DC Fran believes that Hayley's diary uses code words to describe drug use and sex and that she was looking to buy drugs for a New Year's Eve party. Chris states that despite his arrest, he was not the one who visited child porn websites. Investigators were able to prove his credit card info had been stolen, leading to all charges being dropped, but his life had been destroyed. Jamie's former car matches the one seen driving erratically, and Melissa claims that her husband had told her he hit a deer that weekend. Jamie tells police he believed his son accidentally killed Hayley while driving drunk and that her body fell into the nearby river and washed out to sea. After Pete's death, Sandra is arrested for inciting the vigilantism that ultimately killed him. Police arrest Tim after discovering he was pulled over for speeding outside Middenham on 3 January 2000 – the day after he'd returned to London.
18	6	"Episode 6"	Andy Wilson	Chris Lang	19 August 2018	7.31
Tim claims that the scrunchie, woman's knickers and a cross necklace found in a lockbox in his cellar were purchased at a fete for his daughters, but DNA results prove they belonged to Alison Baldwin, a 14-year-old from Earlridge, Cambridgeshire, found raped and strangled in 1997. Tim denies involvement, but after it's revealed he was staying in Earlridge for a medical conference when Alison was abducted from an area near the hotel where he was staying, he confesses to being a serial rapist and murderer of young girls. Without any remorse, Tim nonchalantly explains how he abducted, raped and strangled Hayley while coming across her by chance on New Year's Eve and later takes them to the remains of another, more recent one of his victims. He confesses to there being many more but does not give their details. Chris reconciles with his fiancée, Jamila, who confirmed his story that he had not visited the child porn websites. Cassie visits her father, who encourages her to take time off from work. Several months later, Cassie and Sunny bring flowers to a memorial garden for Hayley.

=== Series 4 (2021) ===
No. overall	No. in series	Title	Directed by	Written by	Original release date	UK viewers (millions)
19	1	"Episode 1"	Andy Wilson	Chris Lang	22 February 2021	9.49
In 2020 DI Sunny Khan and DC Fran Lingley are called in to investigate a headless and handless body found in a freezer on a scrap heap. A chocolate bar wrapper, a tattoo and a missing persons report help identify the victim as Matthew Walsh. Rob Fogerty who owned the freezer is recently deceased and had a drink driving arrest in March 1990. DCI Cassie Stuart's request to retire early on medical grounds is denied, so she returns to work for three more months in order to qualify for a full pension. Ram Sidhu visits his family to wish his mother a happy birthday. Later he joins his partner Anna for the first ultrasound of her pregnancy. Therapist Fiona Grayson enters a Family Counselling Centre after she, her partner Geoff and two young children leave their country home. In Cambridge, Liz Baildon visits her angry home-bound mother and speaks with the home care worker, who tells her she needs a pay increase. Later on Liz meets with her same-sex fiancée. Dean Barton signs papers and contracts in his home office and at his business. Later on he returns a call from "Felix," who asks him for a favour. Dean says "I don't do that anymore" but then asks "How much are we even talking about?" Cassie and Sunny find the last sighting of Matthew Walsh was 10:55 pm on March 30, 1990. Rob Fogerty's drink driving arrest was 40 minutes later, less than a mile from where Matthew was last seen. Sunny notes a line in the police report stating there were four other people in the car. The arresting officer remembers the arrest well because, when arrested, Fogerty began to cry "like a child," and that "All five of them were newly qualified coppers" celebrating their passing out.
20	2	"Episode 2"	Andy Wilson	Chris Lang	1 March 2021	9.40
Cassie wants to review the complete file on Fogarty's arrest to see if any of the four passengers are still serving police officers. Fiona drives to a cemetery and lays flowers at the grave of her parents. The gravestone says "[He] was a copper's copper." Ram, who is a DCI, has been accused of misconduct for the second time – this time sexual harassment – and claims it is racially motivated. Liz, who is a DCC, is interviewed by an official panel regarding her candidacy for chief constable. DS Murray finds that Matthew's parents are now dead but his brother Clive could be alive somewhere. Matthew's girlfriend was pregnant, gave birth to a boy named Jerome, and died from an overdose. Cassie meets with Jerome, who does not feel any connection to his father but might be able to put her in touch with Clive. The search of the remaining belongings from Fogarty's home turns up a key ring with faded writing on the labels. Liz's mother says to her carer, "I could tell you a thing or two about our Elizabeth that would make your hair turn grey." Dean takes a ferry to France and a taxi to a parking lot, where he picks up a van. He counts the cash in an envelope and drives the van onto a ferry. After arriving back in England, he calls Felix, tells him where the van is parked and warns him against asking for any more favors. Ram learns his accuser is filing a complaint and then uses another officer's computer to search for information about her. Fiona and her partner sign a contract for a new counselling office. Sunny finds the hand-written notebook of the officer who stopped Fogarty. There are four first names: Ram, Fiona, Dean and Liz. The personnel department identifies a class of 20 that had their passing ceremony on March 30, 1990 and included officers with those four names: two – Ram and Liz – are still-serving police officers, while Dean and Fiona left the police. Cassie and Sunny decide to release to the media information about the discovery of Matthew's body, including that it may have been kept in a freezer. All four suspects see the request for help during the late news on TV.
21	3	"Episode 3"	Andy Wilson	Chris Lang	9 March 2021	9.26
The morning after the TV announcement, Ram sneaks out of the house. Dean carries on. Liz receives a call telling her, unofficially, that she has been promoted to CC. Fiona calls in sick and then calls her solicitor, asking if there is any way to stop the deposit payment for the new office. Ram waits for his accuser at her home, stops her from closing the door with his foot, and says, "I have a financial proposition." Later he walks into his supervisor's office, provides a plausible motive for her accusation, plays a recording of her using a racial slur, and says, "It's over." Cassie interviews Liz, who gives qualified answers with no more information than what she is asked. She says she does not remember Fogarty until Cassie mentions the drink driving arrest. Liz does remember that and ends the conversation with, "No recollection of anyone getting out to load a dead body into the boot if that's what you mean." Sunny interviews Fiona, who says she remembers Fogarty and Ram but not Liz and Dean. She admits she became a cop entirely for her dad but hated it. On the night of the ceremony she poured "anything I could find down my throat" and does not remember what happened. Later Fiona tells her partner's brother there is something in her past that the mortgage company could discover. She asks if her last name on the application could be changed to her partners' and eventually admits having a criminal conviction. Cassie briefly interviews Dean who had tried to avoid her. He says he does not remember much about the night and admits, "We'd all had a few, so I can't swear." Sunny interviews Ram, who refuses to answer any questions without his solicitor present. Fiona walks up to Liz outside a police station. Liz says, "Are you insane?" and arranges to meet Fiona the next day. DC Fran interviews a witness who says he saw Walsh being chased on that night by two men, one Asian and one unusually tall. DC Jake finds one of the keys from Fogarty's possessions opens a storage unit containing a small freezer that holds Walsh's head and hands.
22	4	"Episode 4"	Andy Wilson	Chris Lang	15 March 2021	9.68
Fiona and Liz meet in a park where Liz frisks Fiona for a wire. Liz asks, "You remember the truth like we agreed?" and they go over Fiona's story. Liz says "They won't find out about the pub," but Fiona is afraid they might "find out what you did for me". DS Murray reports that, three weeks before Matthew disappeared, he was cautioned for serious assault in a pub frequented by probationers. The report deliberately minimized the event to keep the brawl and the probationers' names out of court. It turns out that Matthew had sexually assaulted Fiona, and Ram intervened and got the worst of it. Dean and Ram meet in a forest, and Ram agrees to keep an eye on the historical case. Dean thanks Ram for the short-notice help with Calais, and both agree it was a "one off." Matthew's brother Clive says he was with his brother that night. He was relieving himself in the bushes when he heard "Oi Walshy boy!" He saw an Asian man get out of a car and chase Matthew. Then the tall driver and a third man got out and followed, and finally two women got out from the back seat and also followed. Clive "never saw them or my brother again." He says everyone thought Matthew was lying low, but he was afraid Matthew had died and never said anything because he was ashamed of not intervening. The team now knows all five are suspects because they all got out of the car and followed the victim. A search of their background records does not find a birth certificate or pre-1991 census records for Dean. In response to her question about the police interview, Dean says to his wife, "They can't connect us to that now." Cassie and Sunny interview Ram at the station. He says he remembers leaving the celebration with Rob and Liz because of Rob's arrest and Liz taking them home. He is confronted with Matthew's photograph, the witness accounts, and the pub report, to which he responds that the evidence is weak and may be racially motivated. He says "You have nothing here," and leaves. Fiona reveals to her partner Geoff her 1993 conviction for dangerous driving, which killed a child in the other car. DC Kaz reports on Fiona's arrest, noting that a blood sample was taken due to the smell of alcohol but went missing from the police station. Liz worked at that station at the time, and a couple of years before the arrest, Fiona and Liz lived at the same address. An x-ray of Matthew's skull reveals a long slender object stuck into his brain, potentially the murder weapon.
23	5	"Episode 5"	Andy Wilson	Chris Lang	22 March 2021	9.61
The team learns that Dean Barton changed his surname from Quinn three months before applying to the academy and that the Quinns were a criminal family. The former landlady of the pub tells DS Murray about the incident. Among the probationers was a girl who drank too much and arrived with "Busy Lizzy." Matthew grabbed the drunk girl in the alley behind the pub, Ram intervened, and Matthew "made a mess" of Ram's face. Fiona tells Geoff that, while her therapeutic training and her PhD are real, she bought the counselling license for a hundred quid online because of her criminal conviction. Mobile phone data shows Dean and Ram were close to each other three days after the police announced discovering Matthew's body. Cassie and Sunny agree it is likely that one of the suspects killed Matthew and the others agreed to cover it up. Posters asking for information are hung on a fence near where they believe the murder occurred. An elderly man testifies he remembers seeing two people carrying something wrapped in a tarp. There may have been another who opened the boot, but he definitely remembers a woman and man arguing. Liz asks her mother, "How long have you known . . . what I told Dad?" Her mother insults her, and Liz demands respect and threatens to suffocate her mother. Dean's mother tells Cassie and Sunny that, when he announced he was joining the police force, he was barred from the local pub and beaten by two of his brothers while his father watched. DC Jake reports that Liz was on duty the night the blood sample went missing and had volunteered for overtime. Liz is meeting with her superior when she sees DCs Jake and Murray coming for her. She tells him she is withdrawing her candidacy for CC. Fiona is emotionally unravelling while explaining her past to her family. She tells them how she hated being a cop, began drinking too much and says "I killed a child in a car crash!" which is overheard by DC Fran, who has come into the room. Fiona says to her, "You've come about the body, haven't you?" Cassie interviews Liz, confronting her with the eyewitness testimony. Liz is evasive about having lived with Fiona. Sunny asks her about the day of Fiona's accident, and Liz denies losing the blood test results. Cassie tells her that they do not know the specifics about how Matthew died, but they do know his death had something to do with the five in the car, and they colluded to hide the body, to which Liz responds, "No comment." The pathologist reports that the object in Matthew's skull is a gold-tipped fountain pen that probably was not inserted post mortem. Cassie interviews Fiona and details what they know about the pub incident, her relationship with Liz and the accident, speculating that Liz lost the blood test results because of what Fiona knew about the 1990 incident. She tells Fiona that Matthew appears to have died from a stab wound to the head. Fiona sincerely responds that Matthew was never stabbed, and that Ram told them it was an accident. She talks non-stop for a long time, telling all that she knows in the sequence it happened. She indicates that all five eventually gathered around the unconscious Matthew and realized he was dead. Rob was so upset after they loaded the body into the car that Ram gave him a few swallows of whiskey, which is why he was over the limit when he was stopped afterwards. Cassie meets with the pathologist who identifies the probable brand of the pen, which may have a serial number that could identify the purchaser. The exhausted Cassie is driving home, looks down at her phone before proceeding from a stop, and her car is violently broadsided.
24	6	"Episode 6"	Andy Wilson	Chris Lang	29 March 2021	9.50
Sunny and Cassie's family gather at the hospital, where she has brain surgery. Sunny takes over the team. DC Fran reports that Dean's older brother Stephen was killed in 1989 and that Stephen was "not like the other brothers." DS Murray reports large sums of money transferred between accounts controlled by Dean and by Ram. The latter is arrested and confronted with the growing evidence of his involvement in Matthew's murder and Dean's drug importation. Ram admits that he and Rob chased Matthew because of the tussle in the pub. After several untruthful answers, he finally says, "I didn't kill him. I found him on the ground, bleeding from the head, next to a wall. I tried to save him. Ask the others, they were there, I gave him CPR." Dean is arrested and interviewed. He initially says he remembers falling asleep in Rob's car. Sunny confronts him with the data about the money transfers between his and Ram's accounts, tells him that a customs officer has been arrested and is being cooperative, and asks what leverage he had to corrupt Ram into smuggling drugs? Dean repeatedly says, "No comment," to that question and others directly asking about Ram's involvement in the murder. Reviewing the information with the team, Sunny deduces the missing connection. Confronted by the fact that the pen used to kill Matthew had been purchased for Dean by his brother Stephen, Dean confesses to murdering Matthew, who had killed Stephen the year before. Dean says he found the fallen and unconscious Matthew before the others and shoved the pen into the wound. He left, circled back, and saw Ram giving him CPR. Dean emotionally expresses remorse over the murder and his failure to remove himself from his roots in the violent Quinn family. Dean is charged with murder, and the other three with preventing a lawful burial. Dean and Ram also are charged for their cocaine smuggling operation. Liz is suspended and charged over the blood samples which she has admitted losing. Fiona is charged with practising psychology without a license. The car that hit Cassie's was driven by a young car thief who had no connection with any of the suspects. Cassie dies without regaining consciousness, and Sunny delivers a moving eulogy at her funeral. Final appearance of Nicola Walker as DCI Cassie Stuart.

=== Series 5 (2023) ===
No. overall	No. in series	Title	Directed by	Written by	Original release date	UK viewers (millions)
25	1	"Episode 1"	Andy Wilson	Chris Lang	27 February 2023	8.39
Jessica James succeeds Cassie Stuart as DCI, after two interim leaders, but takes time to gain the trust of her new colleagues. A skeleton leg is discovered in the chimney of a Hammersmith house undergoing refurbishment, and the investigation determines that the victim was a short woman wearing vintage clothing. Thinking the body is more than 55 years old, Jessica initially dismisses the case as obsolete, but further evidence shows that she actually died less than six years ago. Struggling to move forward from Cassie's death and to adjust to Jessica, Sunny drafts but does not send a letter of resignation. He also tells Jessica that he'd been offered her job several times but had always turned it down. Jessica deals with her own personal issues, having discovered that her husband has cheated on her.
26	2	"Episode 2"	Andy Wilson	Chris Lang	6 March 2023	8.10
Jessica's husband tells her that he does not "want to be married to someone who feels like a flatmate" and that they both need some time apart, so he will move out. The victim's cause of death is identified as a gunshot, and evidence suggests she was a drug user. Sunny attempts to keep the flow of information on the case among only him and his colleagues. His partner Sal tells him she is pregnant. Jessica tells Sunny that any new evidence should come to her first, and he states that when she is in the office, he'll make sure that happens. The victim is identified as Precious Falade, who had a history of drug offences and arrests for sex work and theft. DS Fran tracks down information on Precious's mother Ebele, a recovering alcoholic who runs a small, successful restaurant with her husband Dave Adams. Jessica and Sunny inform Ebele of Precious's death. They disagree in their impressions of Ebele's reaction to the news and her response to questions.
27	3	"Episode 3"	Andy Wilson	Chris Lang	13 March 2023	8.41
Forensics discovers blood on the floor of the room where Precious's body was found and evidence that someone had tried to clean it. Interviewing Ebele, Jessica and Sunny find that Precious left home at 15 to join a cult in Wales and was pregnant at the time. Precious stayed with the cult on and off for several years and had little involvement with her son Joseph. DS Fran finds out from social services that Precious was affected by fetal alcohol syndrome and her relationship with Ebele was "terrible." Her last contact with social services was with social worker Karol Wojski, who met with her at the Hammersmith house and resigned the next day. Now living in Paris, Karol is struggling with financial pressures. Jessica asks Sunny to go to Paris to meet with Karol. En route, he receives a call from Sal, who fears she is losing the baby. Jessica questions Lord Anthony Hume, whose sister-in-law owned the Hammersmith house. He says he'd paid a group of squatters to leave the house and denies recognizing a photo of Precious. Jay, a young man in jail for a mugging, leaves a voice message, saying "My mother was Precious Falade, and I was there that night. I was there and I saw it all."
28	4	"Episode 4"	Andy Wilson	Chris Lang	20 March 2023	8.34
Sunny arrives in Paris to interview Karol, who had just made arrangements to sell some expensive watches he'd stolen from one of his jobs. He denies that his last meeting with Precious had anything to do with his resigning from social services. On his way back to London, Sunny receives news that Sal has lost the baby. He and Jessica meet with Jay, who corrects them when they call him Joseph, to tell him about Precious's death. He denies what Karol had reported about his relationship with Precious and claims that cult leader David Bell had been physically, emotionally and sexually violent towards both of them. Having acquired a new solicitor, Jay is released on bail and brought to meet Tony Hume, the recipient of his call in the previous episode. Sunny speaks to people from social services, a foster parent and a prison officer about Jay/Joseph's history. He confronts Jessica about her frequent absences and erratic behaviour and expresses the need for a reset. She agrees, and each of them share the problems they've been having in their personal lives. The forensics report on a bullet found in the Hammersmith house matches it to one associated with an earlier robbery by a known associate of Joseph Bell.
29	5	"Episode 5"	Andy Wilson	Chris Lang	27 March 2023	8.20
DS Murray travels to Wales to find Jay's supposed father, cult leader David Bell, and learns that Bell had died. Sunny's partner Sal decides to move out and take a break from their relationship. Under questioning by Jessica and Sunny, Ebele vehemently denies killing or physically harming her daughter. Later she tells her partner Dave that, when she was 17 and pregnant with Precious, her grandfather forced her to drink half a litre of vodka in an unsuccessful effort to induce an abortion. DC Kaz discusses Tony Hume’s sudden shift from a staunch conservative to more liberal political principles with his former colleague Hussein. He witnessed Tony arguing with a woman who resembled Precious at around the same time, a few months before Precious’s death. Kaz also finds that, early in his career, Tony had worked at the investment firm where, several years later, Ebele walked in with a gun, demanding to see "my dad . . . Tony f***king Hume!" Jay reveals to Jessica and Sunny that he is not Joseph Bell. He’s Joseph’s half brother, whose birth was never registered to prevent his being taken into care. His father, a traveller named Eric Royce, died a year before Precious did. He admits adopting Joseph’s identity to gain benefits but refuses to say what happened to Joseph. An anonymous caller to the station reports knowing where Joseph Bell is buried, and search of the area finds a body.
30	6	"Episode 6"	Andy Wilson	Chris Lang	3 April 2023	8.06
The body is male and was killed with a bullet to the head, possibly around the same time as Precious’s death. DNA confirms that it is Joseph Bell and that Jay is the son of Precious and Eric Royce. Karol admits that Precious was blackmailing him over upskirting photos on his laptop, which he left at the Hammersmith house on the last day he saw her. When he returned the next day, he found the laptop and encountered an older man who had just mopped the floor, whom he identifies as Tony Hume. Tony is arrested before flying out of the country. He admits that Ebele was his daughter and that he let Precious stay in the Hammersmith house. He says that, on the day of Precious’s death, her son Joseph threatened him with a gun. Precious lunged for the gun, but it went off, hitting Joseph in the head. Precious then grabbed the gun and shot herself. Tony disposed of Joseph’s body while Ebele, who arrived after the deaths, held Precious through the night before pushing her body up the chimney. Ebele says that Tony had raped her mother, who worked as a cleaner in his office building. He had been financially supporting her for several years, after a DNA test confirmed his paternity. Because she did not arrive at the Hammersmith house until after the shootings, Ebele believed what Tony told her. Jay reports that he was upstairs on the night of the shootings and came partway down when he heard shouting. He says that Tony slammed Joseph against the wall and started to choke him. Joseph pulled out the gun, but when Precious lunged and the gun went off, she is the one who was shot. Tony took the gun from Joseph and shot him in the back of the head. Jay ran back upstairs and hid for two days. Tony does not deny Jay’s account and asserts that he has tried to make amends since then. When Ebele arrives at Jay’s apartment, she introduces herself and tells him how sorry she is. He admits lying – Tony’s original story was true, but since he was responsible for so much of the family’s pain, Jay said that Tony had killed Joseph. Sunny tells Jessica that Tony will be charged with rape – a 57-year old crime – and murder. She asks him to call her Jessie.

=== Series 6 (2025) ===
No. overall	No. in series	Title	Directed by	Written by	Original release date	UK viewers (millions)
31	1	"Episode 1"	Andy Wilson	Chris Lang	9 February 2025	8.13
Sunny and Jess investigate human remains discovered in the Whitney Marsh but soon discover that the remains are only parts of a body. The search area is widened, and another body part is soon discovered. With it being fairly intact, having been wrapped in bin bags, forensics manage retrieve enough DNA to identify the victim as Gerrard Cooper. He had gone missing in 2021, and the police had concluded that he had killed himself because of marital problems. However, his widow, Juliet, never believed that version of events and suspected that he met a more brutal end. With the case now reopened, Juliet revisits old wounds and lets her daughter Taylor in on the real possibility of her father's being murdered. Jess is still reeling from her sister Debbie's affair with her husband and is wary about speaking to her again, despite her mother's wishes for her at to try and forgive.
32	2	"Episode 2"	Andy Wilson	Chris Lang	10 February 2025	7.49
The team attempts to determine who Gerry Cooper was and what he was up to before his death by questioning his widow, Juliet, about their relationship and his work life. Sunny and Jess learn that he ran a pub before the COVID-19 pandemic and that unpaid rents by tenants in his properties during the pandemic put the family into debt. Gerry had borrowed money from loan sharks in order to make ends meet. However, when the primary creditor is questioned, he explains that they had no desire to kill Gerry because "dead men don't pay debts". Sunny meets with now-imprisoned Ram Sidhu, who led the original investigation, to ask about the evidence and theories they developed. Sidhu points them to a young man who had been laid off from the pub during the pandemic, while the loan shark suggests Gerry may have had an affair with woman he'd observed in Gerry's car. Jess decides to contact her sister again in order to attempt to rekindle their relationship following Debbie's affair with her husband.
33	3	"Episode 3"	Andy Wilson	Chris Lang	16 February 2025	7.61
Jess and Sunny's investigation turns towards several people of interest. Marty Baines is the young man that Gerry laid off during the pandemic. He has autism and several mental health issues. Marty initially bonded with Gerry over their shared right-wing views on immigration and other social issues, but he now is convinced that Gerry held back money he was owed under the U.K.'s pandemic furlough scheme. Conservative media personality Melinda Ricci is identified as the woman with whom Gerry was suspected of having an affair. Murray learns from the agent who assisted Gerry with renting and managing his properties that he could be difficult to work with and was known to be aggressive towards his tenants. She suggests that Murray contact Asif Syed, who acted as an interpreter for Afghan tenants, about a family named Dowari with whom Gerry had a long-running dispute. Jess finally meets her sister again, who comes clean about the details of her affair with Jess's husband Steve, leaving Jess even more unsure how to proceed.
34	4	"Episode 4"	Andy Wilson	Chris Lang	17 February 2025	7.52
While being questioned by Jess and Sunny, Marty implies that Gerry was responsible for his father's death from COVID, but he denies being angry with Gerry over that. In an online interview with Jess and Sunny, Melinda Ricci admits to a short affair with Gerry and implies it had ended several months before his disappearance. However, a review of Gerry's texts and emails show the affair began three years earlier and ended only a few weeks before his death. His last few messages appear to threaten her with blackmail or other harm. Asif admits to Jess and Sunny that he had a few run-ins with Gerry when interpreting for his Afghan tenants. But he is vague on the circumstances and denies remembering the Dowari family. After Fran visits Marty to get a DNA sample, he is seen taking extra doses of his anti-anxiety medication. Jess asks Taylor's school whether the girl can be questioned without her mother's presence, but then Juliet comes to the station to report that Marty had broken into their home a week before Gerry disappeared. Taylor encountered him when she came home from school and talked him down from his threats of violence against her father. Jess and her team begin to paint a picture of a man with strong political views who could have been abusive to both his wife and his mistress. When the woman providing care for Marty's disabled mother finds he has locked their home and left, she calls the police, who break in and find his mother unconscious in her wheelchair.
35	5	"Episode 5"	Andy Wilson	Chris Lang	23 February 2025	7.50
The details of the events prior to Gerry's death are gradually mapped out. CCTV from the Whitney Marsh car park reveals a vehicle arriving late at night the night before he was reported missing, but the license plates are fake or have been altered. Jess wonders if Gerry had actually disappeared the day before the report. Juliet is upset with her questions – especially when Jess requests speaking with Taylor – and refuses further cooperation. When Sunny meets with Melinda, she admits her relationship with Gerry was longer than she initially said. She denies ever being hit by Gerry and claims not to remember his threatening messages. Later Sunny meets with a local priest who had become very close to Melinda, who says she told him of a long-term affair with a married man that resulted in a pregnancy. When a search of Melinda's storage unit finds a jacket stained with Gerry's blood, she is arrested and brought in. Asif is brought in because his DNA matches a sample found on Gerry's sweatshirt after he'd been assaulted three weeks before the disappearance. He answers "no comment" to their questions and also denies having contact with the Dowari family after he stopped working for the local council. Jess confronts her husband Steve about what she learned from her sister. Later he admits that he also had affairs with other women, and he claims to have a sex addiction. Jess decides that their marriage is over and arranges for him to move out.
36	6	"Episode 6"	Andy Wilson	Chris Lang	24 February 2025	7.58
After wandering around London, Marty breaks into the Cooper's home and is apprehended by police. He claims he wanted to offer his condolences to Taylor on her father's death. Under questioning by Sunny, Melinda explains that she got Gerry's blood on her jacket after he hit her and she hit him back. The argument was over his threat to publicly reveal their affair and the fact that she'd had the pregnancy terminated, despite her avowed pro-life principles. Murray visits the Dowari family, who describe how Asif supported their effort to get Gerry to repair hazardous conditions in the flat that eventually led to the death of their youngest child. Asif admits that he confronted Gerry, who tried to hit him. Asif knocked him down, but Gerry was alive when he left him. The team deduces that the altered plate number belongs to Juliet's old vehicle. When they bring Juliet in for questioning, she confesses to the murder and disposing of Gerry's body. But Sunny and Jess realise the events she describes do not match evidence regarding Gerry's movements that day. They question 14-year-old Taylor, who describes often hearing her parents argue. On the last occasion, when she saw Gerry beating and stomping on her mother, she grabbed a knife and stabbed him in the leg. Her mother led her back to her room and put her to bed while Gerry bled to death. The next day Juliet disposed of Gerry's body as she had previously described. Realising that Taylor does not know she caused her father's death in defense of her mother, Jess and Sunny are uncertain whether to allow Juliet to plead guilty to murder or to report Taylor's story to the prosecution service. Ultimately they leave the decision to Juliet, and the prosecution determines that it is not in the public interest for either of them to be charged, so they both are freed. Asif is released and reunited with his boyfriend Sam, who took the blame for housing Hassam, an Afghan refugee Asif had helped illegally enter the country. Sam proposes to Asif. Marty visits with his recovering mother in the hospital and agrees to getting additional help that will allow her to return home. Melinda returns to the hospital where her fiancé is working to overcome his paralysis.

== International broadcast ==
Prior to the UK broadcast of the third series, the first series premiered on 8 April 2018 in the United States, as part of PBS Masterpiece Mystery. After two back-to-back episodes were aired each week, the second series was similarly broadcast as three weekly parts from 29 April 2018 to 13 May 2018. Series 3 premiered on 7 April 2019. Series 4 premiered on 11 July 2021. Series 5 Premiered on 9 September 2023.

== Home media ==
The first three series have been released on Region 2 DVD individually. A box-set release of the first two series was made available shortly after the broadcast of the second series. A further box-set release of the first three series came out shortly after the broadcast of the third series. The fourth series has also been released on Region 2 DVD on its own. The first five series have been made available on Amazon Prime in some countries.

== Awards and nominations ==
Year	Award	Category	Nominee	Result	Ref
2016	British Academy Television Awards	Best Supporting Actor	Tom Courtenay	Won	
2016	Royal Television Society Programme Awards	Best Actor – Male	Tom Courtenay	Nominated	
2016	Broadcasting Press Guild (BPG) Awards	Best Actress	Nicola Walker	Nominated	
2016	C21 International Drama Awards	Best English-Language Drama Series	Unforgotten	Nominated	
2016	C21 International Drama Awards	Best Casting of a Drama Series	Unforgotten	Nominated	
2017	London Screenwriters' Festival – British Screenwriters’ Awards	Best Crime Writing on Television (Series/Single Drama)	Chris Lang	Nominated	
2017	British Academy Scotland Awards	Best Actor in Television	Mark Bonnar	Won	
2018	Broadcasting Press Guild (BPG) Awards	Best Actor	Mark Bonnar	Won	
2019	British Academy Television Awards	Best Supporting Actor	Alex Jennings	Nominated	
2022	British Academy Television Awards	Best Drama Series	Unforgotten	Nominated	

== Remake ==
In 2017, it was reported that a remake was in development for ABC in the United States, with Josh Berman, Sony Pictures Television and BBC Worldwide Productions producing. Retitled Suspects, it was to feature a new cast and crew. Chris Lang would not be involved in the United States version, and Nicola Walker would not make an appearance.
