= Ruby Ashbourne Serkis =

English actress

- Born: Hackney, London, England
- Occupation: Actress
- Years active: 2010–present
- Parents: Andy Serkis (father); Lorraine Ashbourne (mother)
- Relatives: Louis Ashbourne Serkis (brother)

Ruby Ashbourne Serkis is an English actress. On television, she is known for her roles in the Netflix series The Letter for the King (2020), the UKTV series I, Jack Wright (2025–) and the Apple TV+ series Star City (2026).

== Early life and education ==
Ruby Ashbourne Serkis was born in Hackney, east London, to actors Andy Serkis and Lorraine Ashbourne. She grew up in north London with her younger brothers Sonny and Louis, both of whom are also actors.

She attended the City of London School for Girls.

== Career ==
Ashbourne Serkis began her career with small cameos before landing the titular role in the 2015 BBC One television film adaptation of Laurie Lee's memoir Cider with Rosie, for which she received critical acclaim. The following year, she portrayed a young version of Susan Lynch's character in the Channel 4 miniseries National Treasure.

She returned to television in 2020 as Lavinia in the Netflix fantasy series The Letter for the King, an English-language adaptation of the Dutch book by Tonke Dragt.

Ashbourne Serkis appeared opposite Alice Englert in the first episode of the crime drama The Serpent in 2021. In the same year, she and her brother Sonny played siblings in the film La Cha Cha. Although the film received mixed reviews, her performance was praised. In 2022, Ashbourne Serkis appeared in Peter Farrelly's biographical film The Greatest Beer Run Ever for Apple TV+.

In 2022, she portrayed a young Amy Robsart in the Starz historical drama Becoming Elizabeth.

Ashbourne Serkis played Emily Wright in the 2025 drama series I, Jack Wright. In David Hare's play Grace Pervades, she played Edith Craig in 2025 at Theatre Royal, Bath, and transferred in 2026 to the Theatre Royal, Haymarket.

== Filmography ==
=== Film ===
Year	Title	Role	Notes
2010	Sex & Drugs & Rock & Roll	Kid at Birthday Party	
2012	The Hobbit: An Unexpected Journey	Cute Young Hobbit	
2014	Off the Page: Groove Is in the Heart	Janine	Short film
2014	The Hobbit: The Battle of the Five Armies	Laketown Girl	Uncredited role
2021	La Cha Cha	Libby Rees	
2022	The Greatest Beer Run Ever	Christine Donahue	Apple TV+ film
2025	Steve	Charlotte	
2026	Peaky Blinders: The Immortal Man	Agnes	Netflix film

=== Television ===
Year	Title	Role	Notes
2015	Cider with Rosie	Rosie	Television film
2016	National Treasure	Young Christina	Miniseries; episodes 2 and 4
2020	The Letter for the King	Lavinia	Main role; 6 episodes
2021	The Serpent	Celia Wilson	Miniseries; episode 1
2022	Becoming Elizabeth	Amy Robsart	Miniseries; episodes 6–8
2024	Shardlake	Alice	Miniseries; 4 episodes
2025–present	I, Jack Wright	Emily Wright	Main role; 6 episodes
2026	Star City	Tanya Mironova	Main role

== Audio ==
Year	Title	Role	Notes
2018	In Here	Ruby	BBC Radio 4
