= 2017 British Academy Scotland Awards =

- Date: 5 November 2017
- Site: Radisson Blu Hotel, Glasgow, Scotland
- Hosted by: Edith Bowman

Television coverage
- Network: Streaming webcast

The 27th British Academy Scotland Awards were held on 5 November 2017 at the Radisson Blu Hotel in Glasgow, honouring the best Scottish film and television productions of 2017. The nominees were announced on 4 October 2017, with the ceremony being hosted by Edith Bowman.

== Nominees ==
Winners are listed first and highlighted in boldface.

Best Feature Film	Best Director (Fiction)
**T2 Trainspotting**; Accidental Anarchist; Donkeyote	**Danny Boyle - T2 Trainspotting**; Hope Dickson Leach - The Levelling; Tom Vaughan - Victoria
Best Actor in Film	Best Actress in Film
**Ewen Bremner - T2 Trainspotting**; Robert Carlyle - T2 Trainspotting; Ewan McGregor - T2 Trainspotting	**Deirdre Mullins - The Dark Mile**; Kate Dickie - Prevenge; Freya Mavor - Modern Life Is Rubbish
Best Entertainment	Best Features & Factual Series
**All Round To Mrs Brown's**; The Dog Ate My Homework; Robot Wars	**The Council**; Fair Isle: Living On The Edge; Prison: First And Last 24 Hours
Best Actor in Television	Best Actress in Television
**Mark Bonnar - Unforgotten**; Martin Compston - In Plain Sight; Douglas Henshall - In Plain Sight	**Laura Fraser - The Missing**; Morven Christie - The Replacement; Juliet Stevenson - One Of Us
Best Writer Film/Television	Best Television Scripted
**Hope Dickson Leach - The Levelling**; Joe Ahearne - The Replacement; Simon Carlyle, Gregor Sharp - Two Doors Down	**The Replacement - Joe Ahearne, Nicole Cauverien, Andy Harries, Suzanne Mackie**; In Plain Sight - Simon Heath, Gillian McNeill, Nick Stevens, John Strickland; Two Doors Down - Catherine Gosling Fuller, Sasha Ransome, Simon Carlyle, Gregor Sharp
Best Director (Factual)	Best Current Affairs
**Louise Lockwood - Fair Isle: Living on the Edge**; Darren Hercher - Sighthill; John Maclaverty - Glasgow 1967: The Lisbon Lions	**Eopra Special: Guantanamo Detainees**; The Insiders Guide To The Menopause; Who Cares
Best Single Documentary	Best Short Film
**Glasgow 1967: The Lisbon Lions - John MacLaverty, Alex Gale, Hazel Irvine, David Martin**; Billy Connolly: Portrait Of A Lifetime - Pauline Law, Liam McArdle, Mandy Weller, Billy Connolly; Sighthill - Darren Hercher	**The Inescapable Arrival of Laxlo Pethushki - Sven Werner, David Brown**; 1745 - Morayo Akandé, Gordon Napier, John McKay; Plastic Man - Yulia Kovanova, Tracey Fearnehough, Ian Dodds, Anthea Harvey
Best Specialist Factual	Best Animation
**The Marvellous World of Roald Dahl**; Francis Bacon: A Brush with Violence; Scotland And The Klan	**Life Cycles**; Home Matters; Spindrift
Best Game
**Stories Untold**; Brut@l; Red's Kingdom

=== Outstanding Contribution to Film & Television ===
- **Armando Iannucci**

=== Outstanding Contribution to Craft ===
- **Doug Allan**

== See also ==
- 70th British Academy Film Awards
- 89th Academy Awards
- 23rd Screen Actors Guild Awards
