= Trevor Eve =

British actor (born 1951)

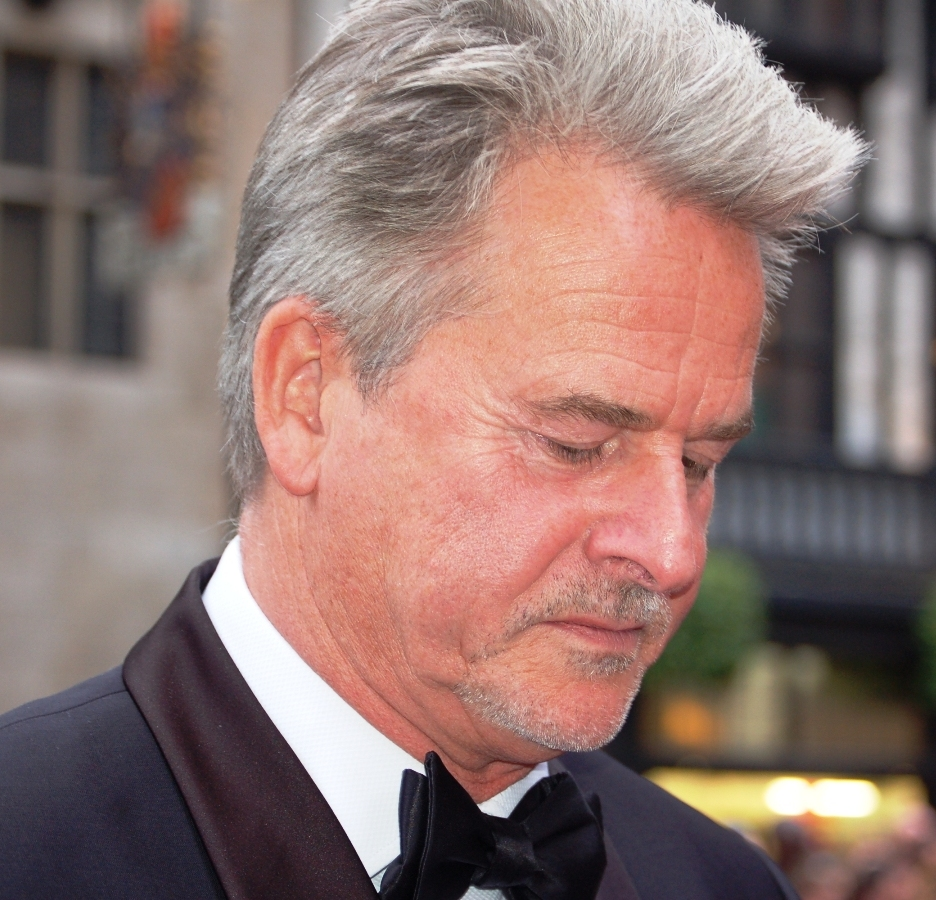
- Eve at the 2008 BAFTA Television Awards
- Born: Trevor John Eve; 1 July 1951 (age 74); Sutton Coldfield, Birmingham, England
- Occupation: Actor
- Years active: 1974–present
- Spouse: Sharon Maughan (m. 1980)
- Children: 3, including Alice

Trevor John Eve (born 1 July 1951) is an English actor. In 1979, he gained fame as the eponymous lead in the detective series Shoestring (1979–1980) and is also known for his role as Detective Superintendent Peter Boyd in the long-running BBC television drama Waking the Dead (2000–2011). He is the father of three children, including actress Alice Eve. He is the winner of two Laurence Olivier Awards in theatre.

== Early life ==
Eve was born in Sutton Coldfield,Birmingham, the son of Elsie (née Hamer) and Stewart Frederick Eve. His father, a publican, was English, and his Welsh mother was from Glynneath. Educated at Bromsgrove School, he had little acting experience during his school days. He studied architecture at Kingston Polytechnic (now Kingston University) in London. He lost interest and dropped out of the course to pursue acting. He enrolled at the Royal Academy of Dramatic Art, graduating in 1973 with a diploma in acting.

== Career ==
Eve portrayed Paul McCartney in Willy Russell's 1974 play John, Paul, George, Ringo ... and Bert at the Lyric Theatre in London's West End, which won The Evening Standard Award and London Critics Awards for Best Musical. Eve appeared in Hindle Wakes (1976) directed by Laurence Olivier as part of the Laurence Olivier Presents TV series. In 1977, Eve joined the cast of Franco Zeffirelli's Filumena, in London's West End, where he met future wife, Sharon Maughan.

From 1979 to 1980, he played the role of the private investigator Eddie Shoestring in Shoestring. He then went on to his first major film role in the 1979 Dracula directed by John Badham, playing Jonathan Harker, alongside Laurence Olivier. In 1982, Eve won the Laurence Olivier Award for Actor of the Year in a New Play, playing James Leeds in Children of a Lesser God.

After appearing at The Royal Court Theatre in The Genius in 1982, he returned to the West End in 1986 to star in Cole Porter's High Society with Natasha Richardson and Stephen Rea, followed by his portrayal as Paolino in the 1989 Royal National Theatre production of Man, Beast And Virtue, directed by William Gaskill.

In television, he appeared in A Sense of Guilt in 1989, and the 1992 BBC production of A Doll's House with Juliet Stevenson, whom he also worked alongside in the BAFTA and International Emmy Award-winning political drama The Politician's Wife. He co-starred in the short-lived 1985 ABC series Shadow Chasers. In 1991, he co-starred with Francesca Annis in the BBC miniseries Parnell and the Englishwoman portraying the Irish politician Charles Stewart Parnell. Eve won the 1997 Laurence Olivier Award for Best Actor in a Supporting Role for his portrayal of Dr Astrov in Uncle Vanya.

He then went on to star in the 1998 Carlton Television/WGBH Boston television series Heat of the Sun, which was filmed in Zimbabwe, and portrayed the titular character's wicked stepfather Edward Murdstone in BBC's 1999 adaptation of David Copperfield opposite Daniel Radcliffe and Maggie Smith. In September 2000, Eve starred in the BBC drama series Waking the Dead, in the role of Detective Superintendent Peter Boyd. Eve continued to play Boyd throughout the subsequent nine series of the drama.

Eve was one of the artists who recited Shakespearian sonnets on the 2002 album When Love Speaks. That same year, Eve played Cropper in Possession, directed by Neil LaBute, and continued his work in film in Troy, directed by Wolfgang Petersen in 2004, and The Family Man in 2006.

In April 2008, Eve starred as game show host and TV personality Hughie Green in the BBC Four biographical film Hughie Green, Most Sincerely. In 2010, Eve played the father of the female lead, his real-life daughter, Alice, in She's Out of My League, and starred as Peter Manson in the ITV/Mammoth Screen remake of Bouquet of Barbed Wire. In January 2011, he starred in the three-part ITV drama Kidnap and Ransom, filmed on location in South Africa, and reprised his role as Dominic King in 2012 for the second series.

After co-founding Projector Productions in 1995, Eve has produced TV movies Cinderella, featuring Kathleen Turner, Alice through The Looking Glass, starring Kate Beckinsale, and Twelfth Night starring Chiwetel Ejiofor. Eve also served as executive producer on his successful series Kidnap and Ransom, and The Body Farm with Tara Fitzgerald.

He also starred in a three-part drama on ITV called Lawless. Eve played the part of Judge Sir Selwyn Hardcastle in the BBC's Death Comes to Pemberley in December 2013, and as Roach in The Interceptor in 2014. Eve also worked on son Jack Eve's debut feature film as writer-director, Death of a Farmer.

On 19 February 2014, Eve was part of the invited audience at Buckingham Palace to celebrate the centennial of the Royal Academy of Dramatic Art. He and his wife were asked to perform in front of the Queen in the Investiture Room, along with Hugh Laurie, Sir Tom Courtenay and Dame Helen Mirren. Eve played Professor Higgins in an extract from Pygmalion.

In 2018, Eve played the part of Gerbert d'Aurillac in the TV-series A Discovery of Witches.

=== Awards ===
In 1982, Eve was awarded the Laurence Olivier Award for Actor of the Year in a New Play (1981 theatre season), for his performance in Children of a Lesser God.

In 1997, he was awarded the Laurence Olivier Award for Best Actor in a Supporting Role for his 1996 performance in Uncle Vanya at the Noël Coward Theatre.

== Personal life ==
Eve met Sharon Maughan in 1979, when they both had parts in the West End production of Filumena. They married in 1980 and have three children: actress Alice Eve, Jack and George. In 2010, Trevor, Sharon and Alice all appeared in She's Out of My League playing father, mother and daughter respectively.

Eve is a patron of the charity Child Hope UK.

== Filmography ==
Key
| † | Denotes projects that have not yet been released |

=== Film ===
| Year | Film | Role | Notes | Ref. |
|---|---|---|---|---|
| 1976 | Children | Man in Shower | Short film | |
| 1979 | Dracula | Jonathan Harker | | |
| 1989 | Scandal | Douglas Fairbanks Jr. | | |
| 1992 | In the Name of the Father | Knight | Short film | |
| 1993 | Aspen Extreme | Karl Stall | | |
| 1994 | Don't Get Me Started | Jack Lane | | |
| 1996 | Soup | Lucifer | Short film | |
| 1998 | Appetite | Jay | | |
| 1998 | Next Birthday | Mike | Short film | |
| 2002 | Possession | Cropper | | |
| 2004 | Troy | Velior | | |
| 2010 | She's Out of My League | Mr. McCleish | | |
| 2014 | Death of a Farmer | Gordon | | |
| 2017 | Bees Make Honey | Commissioner | | |
| 2025 | Red Sonja | Maester Crudelis | | |

=== Television ===
| Year | Title | Role | Notes | Ref. |
|---|---|---|---|---|
| 1974 | 2nd House | Paul McCartney | Episode: "John, Paul, George, Ringo ... and Bert" | |
| 1976 | Hindle Wakes | Alan Jeffcote | Television film | |
| 1977 | The Sunday Drama | Jim | Episode: "The Portrait" | |
| 1977 | London Belongs to Me | Bill Davenport | Recurring role; 4 episodes | |
| 1979–1980 | Shoestring | Eddie Shoestring | Series regular; 21 episodes | |
| 1983 | Jamaica Inn | Jeremiah "Jem" Merlyn | Miniseries; 2 episodes | |
| 1983 | A Brother's Tale | Gordon Taylor | Miniseries; 3 episodes | |
| 1984 | Lace | Tom Schwartz | Miniseries; 2 episodes | |
| 1985 | The Corsican Brothers | Louis / Lucien de Franchi | Television film | |
| 1985–1986 | Shadow Chasers | Dr. Jonathan MacKensie | Series regular; 14 episodes | |
| 1987 | A Wreath of Roses | Richard | Television film | |
| 1988 | Life on the Flipside | Tripper Day | Television film | |
| 1988 | Beryl Markham: A Shadow on the Sun | Denys Finch Hatton | Miniseries | |
| 1989 | Dear John USA | Ricky Fortune | Recurring role; 2 episodes | |
| 1989 | The Stone Age | Dave Stone | Television film | |
| 1990 | A Sense of Guilt | Felix Cramer | Series regular; 7 episodes | |
| 1990 | Coup de foudre | Alphonse Malard | Episode: "Adolphe et les menteuses" | |
| 1991 | Parnell and the Englishwoman | Charles Stewart Parnell | Miniseries; 4 episodes | |
| 1992 | Murder, She Wrote | Julian Fontaine | Episode: "Tinker, Tailor, Liar, Thief" | |
| 1992 | Jack's Place | Max Kendall | Episode: "I See Cupid, I See France" | |
| 1992 | The President's Child | Paul LaFlore | Television film | |
| 1992 | A Doll's House | Torvald Helmer | Television film | |
| 1994 | Screen One | Malcolm Iverson | Episode: "Murder in Mind" | |
| 1995 | The Politician's Wife | Duncan Matlock | Miniseries; 3 episodes | |
| 1995 | Screen Two | Alex Fisher | Episode: "Black Easter" | |
| 1996 | Ivana Trump's For Love Alone | Mark | Television film | |
| 1998 | Heat of the Sun | Albert Tyburn | Miniseries; 3 episodes | |
| 1998 | The Tribe | Kanahan | | |
| 1999 | An Evil Streak | Alex Kyle | Miniseries; 3 episodes | |
| 1999 | David Copperfield | Edward Murdstone | Miniseries; 2 episodes | |
| 1999 | Doomwatch | Neil Tannahill | Doomwatch: Winter Angel | |
| 2000–2011 | Waking the Dead | Peter Boyd | Series regular; 92 episodes | |
| 2004 | Lawless | John Paxton | Miniseries; 2 episodes | |
| 2006 | The Family Man | Patrick Stowe | Miniseries; 3 episodes | |
| 2008 | Hughie Green, Most Sincerely | Hughie Green | Television film | |
| 2009 | Framed | Quentin Lester | Television film | |
| 2010 | Bouquet of Barbed Wire | Peter Manson | Miniseries; 3 episodes | |
| 2011 | The Family Firm | Judge Hamilton | Television | |
| 2011–2012 | Kidnap and Ransom | Dominic King | Series regular; 6 episodes | |
| 2012 | Playhouse Presents | Robert | Episode: "The Other Woman" | |
| 2013 | Death Comes to Pemberley | Sir Selwyn Hardcastle | Miniseries; 3 episodes | |
| 2015 | The Interceptor | Roach | Miniseries; 8 episodes | |
| 2015 | Unforgotten | Sir Phillip Cross | Series regular; 6 episodes | |
| 2017–2018 | Strike Back: Retribution | Morgan Ives | Recurring role; 4 episodes | |
| 2018–2022 | A Discovery of Witches | Gerbert d'Aurillac | Series regular; 19 episodes | |
| 2019 | My Best Friend's Christmas | Winston Seever | Television film | |
| 2021 | The American Guest | J. P. Morgan | Miniseries; 4 episodes | |
| 2025 | I, Jack Wright | Jack Wright | Miniseries; 1 episode | |
