= Amnesia (TV series) =

- DVD cover
- Genre: Crime drama; Thriller
- Created by: Chris Lang
- Starring: John Hannah; Jemma Redgrave; Anthony Calf; Patrick Malahide; Brendan Coyle
- Country of origin: United Kingdom
- Original language: English
- No. of series: 1
- No. of episodes: 2 (list of episodes)

Production
- Executive producer: Robert Bernstein
- Producer: Jeremy Gwilt
- Running time: 90 mins (w/out advertisements)

Original release
- Network: ITV
- Release: 29 March – 30 March 2004

Amnesia is a one-off British crime drama television mini-series broadcast on ITV in March 2004, starring John Hannah as the protagonist, D.S. Mackenzie Stone, whose wife disappeared without trace three months ago. Written by Chris Lang and directed by Nicholas Laughland, the series gathered an average of 4m viewers.

The DVD of the series was released on 4 October 2004, a week prior to broadcast. In the United States, the series aired on PBS as part of the Masterpiece Mystery! block of programming.

== Plot ==
Part 1 D.S. Mackenzie Stone (John Hannah) is distraught after his wife's sudden disappearance on their fifth wedding anniversary, and strives tirelessly to discover what has happened to her. He has very little memory of what happened on the night she disappeared, and struggles to comprehend any reason as to why she took off, except for brief flashbacks and terrible nightmares. Three months on, whilst constantly searching through missing persons reports, Stone comes across two cases: one involving a man named Paul West, who was reported missing after his wife and son were killed in a house fire, and the other the mysterious John Dean (Anthony Calf), an IT consultant who has lost his memory for unknown reasons and that he moved into the town only days after the fire. Stone is convinced that Dean is actually West, and that he murdered his wife and stepson. Meanwhile, Dean is looking for information to help him find out exactly who he was before he lost his memory. He is asked to take part in an experiment for a memory treatment that shows great promise. At first he refuses, unsure that he wants to rediscover his past as he is happily married to Jenna (Jemma Redgrave), and has a good life - but deciding they need the money, agrees to do it.

Part 2 While Stone doggedly continues his investigation into John Dean's mysterious past, his colleagues begin to harbour serious suspicions about his involvement in his wife's disappearance, but without proof, they can do no more than keep a discreet eye on him. D.C. Ian Reid (Brendan Coyle) becomes convinced that Stone has murdered his wife. Stone, meanwhile, is determined to convince Reid to visit John Dean, convinced that Dean, as West, killed his wife and child and has more than likely killed before - and could be involved in the disappearance of his own wife. Stone is determined to solve the mystery and bring Dean to justice - but before he can prove his guilt, Stone finds himself in a surprising encounter with Dean's wife, Jenna.

== Cast ==
- John Hannah as D.S. Mackenzie Stone
- Jemma Redgrave as Jenna Dean
- Anthony Calf as John Dean
- Patrick Malahide as D.I. Michael Brennan
- Brendan Coyle as D.C. Ian Reid
- Jeremy Child as Dr. Mark Denton
- Rupert Farley as D.I. Mick Challoner
- Beatriz Batarda as Lucia Stone
- Lolita Chakrabarti as Parminder Kelsey
