= Nikki Amuka-Bird =

British actress

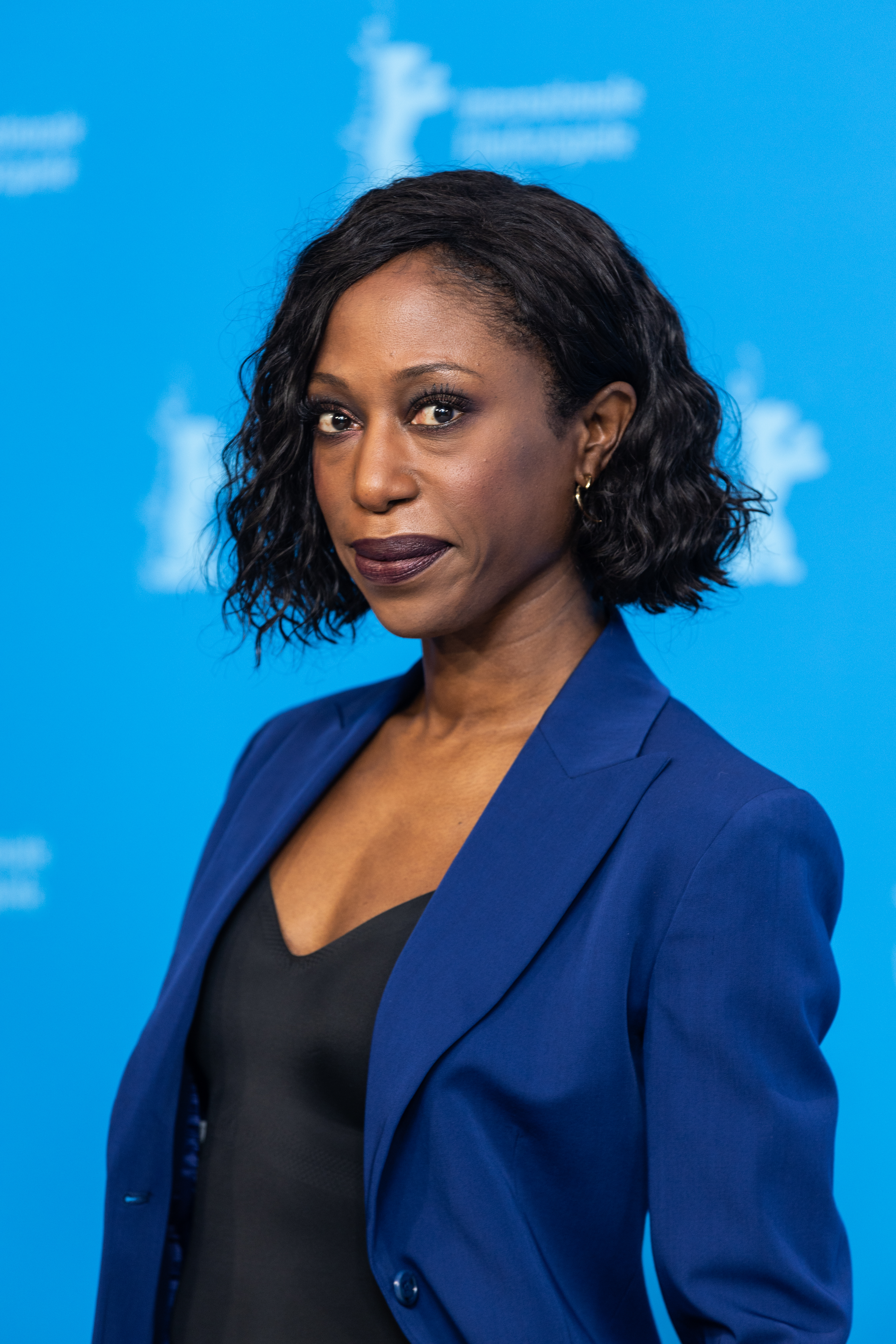
- Amuka-Bird in 2022
- Born: Delta State, Nigeria
- Education: London Academy of Music and Dramatic Art
- Occupation: Actress
- Years active: 1999–present
- Spouse: Geoffrey Streatfeild (m. 2003; div. 2010)

Nikki Amuka-Bird is a British actress of the stage, television, and film. She is known for her appearances on TV series such as Small Island (2009), NW (2016), and I, Jack Wright (2025), and appeared in the 2019 film The Personal History of David Copperfield.

== Early life and education ==
Nikki Amuka-Bird was born in Delta State, Nigeria, where her father still lived as of 2018. She left there as a young child with her mother and was brought up in England, Lagos and in Antigua.

Attending boarding school at Hurtwood House in England, Amuka-Bird originally hoped to be a dancer. That ambition was thwarted by injury, after she hurt her back, so she enrolled at drama school.

She attended the London Academy of Music and Dramatic Art (LAMDA). She started her stage career with the Royal Shakespeare Company (RSC).

== Career ==
External image
- Amuka-Bird at the Virgin TV BAFTA Television Awards in 2017

Amuka-Bird's theatrical credits include Welcome to Thebes (National Theatre); Twelfth Night (Bristol Old Vic, for which she won an Ian Charleson Award nomination in 2004 for playing Viola); World Music (Crucible Theatre, Sheffield, and Donmar Warehouse); Top Girls (Oxford Stage Company); A Midsummer Night's Dream, The Tempest and The Servant of Two Masters (RSC); Doubt: A Parable (Tricycle Theatre).

Her film credits include The Omen (2006 remake), Cargo, Almost Heaven as well as the screen adaptation of Alexander McCall Smith's novel The No. 1 Ladies' Detective Agency. On television, Amuka-Bird appeared in Spooks, The Line of Beauty, The Last Enemy, Robin Hood, an episode of Torchwood, and a recurring role in the reimagined BBC apocalyptic series Survivors. In 2010 she appeared as Detective Superintendent Gaynor Jenkins in the BBC's Silent Witness.

She appeared in Small Island, the BBC adaptation of Andrea Levy's award-winning novel, broadcast in December 2009. She starred in the TV production of Zadie Smith's novel NW, broadcast on BBC Two on 14 November 2016 and Amuka-Bird received a BAFTA nomination for Best Actress.

On Christmas Day 2017, she was heard as the voice of the Glass Woman in the Doctor Who Christmas Special "Twice Upon a Time" broadcast on BBC One.

She played the role of Rav Mulclair, Head of Judd Mission Control, in HBO's Avenue 5 from 2020 to 2022. She had a few film roles in 2019 for The Personal History of David Copperfield as Miss Steerforth and 2021 for Old as Patricia, a psychologist with epilepsy.

In 2025 she played a lead role as Sally Wright I, Jack Wright.

== Personal life ==
Amuka-Bird was married to actor Geoffrey Streatfeild from 2003 to 2010.

== Filmography ==
Key
†	Denotes projects that have not yet been released

=== Film ===
Year	Show	Role	Notes	Ref.
2000	Forgive and Forget	Nicky	Television film	
2000	Safe as Houses	Carole	Television film	
2005	Almost Heaven	Rosie		
2006	Cargo	Subira		
2006	Shoot the Messenger	Heather	Television film	
2006	The Omen	Dr. Becker		
2006	Born Equal	Itshe	Television film	
2008	The Disappeared	Shelley Cartwright		
2011	Coriolanus	TV Pundit		
2013	The House and Everything	Tash	Short film	
2014	The Face of an Angel	Roxanne		
2015	Jupiter Ascending	Diomika Tsing		
2016	The Complete Walk: A Midsummer Night's Dream	Hippolyta	Short film	
2016	Denial	Libby Holbrook		
2016	NW	Natalie Blake	Television film	
2017	The Children Act	Amadia Kalu QC		
2018	The NHS: To Provide All People	A&E Consultant	Television film	
2018	A Private War	Rita Williams		
2019	The Laundromat	Miranda		
2019	The Personal History of David Copperfield	Mrs. Steerforth		
2019	Vert	Emelia	Short film	
2021	Old	Patricia Carmichael		
2022	The Outfit	Violet LaFontaine		
2022	Persuasion	Lady Russell		
2023	Knock at the Cabin	Sabrina		
2023	Jericho Ridge	Tabby Temple		
2024	Rumours	Cardosa Dewindt		
2024	E for Eileen	Eileen Gray	Short film	
2024	Here	Helen Harris		
2024	Marriage Unplugged	Suzanna	Short film	
2025	The Breakdown of a Toxic Relationship as told by Fluffmeister, a Poodle of Questionable Heritage	Mummy	Short film	
2026	Clarissa	Sally		

=== Television ===
Year	Show	Role	Notes	Ref.
1999	The Bill	Doreen West	Episode: "Taxed"	
1999	Grafters	Martha	Recurring role; 4 episodes	
1999	Holby City	Tracy	Episode: "Search for the Hero"	
2000	Doctors	Nurse	Episode: "Killing Me Softly"	
2002	NCS: Manhunt	Janice Onwaugha	Episode: "Out of Time: Part 1"	
2003	Canterbury Tales	Constance Musa	Episode: "The Man of Law's Tale"	
2003	Holby City	Josie Wallis	Episode: "When That Shark Bites"	
2003–2004	Bad Girls	Paula Miles	Recurring role; 8 episodes	
2004	Murder Prevention	Gemma Andrews	Episode: "Judgement Day"	
2005	Silent Witness	Simone Campbell	Episode: "Choices"	
2005	Afterlife	Sandra Petch	Episode: "Sleeping with the Dead"	
2005	Casualty@Holby City	Moji Muzenda	Recurring role; 3 episodes	
2006	The Line of Beauty	Rosemary Charles	Miniseries; 2 episodes	
2006	Spooks	Michelle Lopez	Episode: "World Trade"	
2006	Robin Hood	The Abbess of Rufford	Episode: "The Taxman Cometh"	
2007	Five Days	PC Simone Farnes	Series regular; 5 episodes	
2007	The Whistleblowers	Helen Errol	Episode: "Starters"	
2008	Torchwood	Beth	Episode: "Sleeper"	
2008	The Last Enemy	Susan Ross	Miniseries; 1 episode	
2008	The No. 1 Ladies' Detective Agency	Alice Busang	Episode: "Pilot"	
2008–2010	Survivors	Samantha Willis	Recurring role; 5 episodes	
2009	Small Island	Celia Langley	Miniseries	
2010	Silent Witness	Gaynor Jenkins	Episode: "Voids"	
2011–2013	Luther	Erin Gray	Recurring role; 8 episodes	
2012	Sinbad	Professor	Episode: "For Whom the Egg Shatters"	
2014	House of Fools	Fiona	Episode: "The Probation Affair"	
2014	Death in Paradise	Anna Jackson	Episode: "The Man with the Golden Gun"	
2014	Lovesick	Anna	Episode: "Anna"	
2015	Inside No. 9	Joanne	Episode: "Cold Comfort"	
2016	Quarry	Ruth Solomon	Series regular; 8 episodes	
2017	Doctor Who	Helen Clay	Episode: "Twice Upon a Time"	
2018	Hard Sun	Grace Morrigan	Miniseries; 6 episodes	
2019	Gold Digger	Marsha	Miniseries; 6 episodes	
2020–2022	Avenue 5	Rav Mulclair	Series regular; 17 episodes	
2023	Citadel	Grace	Recurring role; 3 episodes	
2025	I, Jack Wright	Sally Wright	Series regular; 6 episodes	
2025	Play for Today	Maggie Bray	Episode: "A Knock at the Door"	
2026	Betrayal	Simone Grant	Series regular; 4 episodes	

== Theatre credits ==
Year	Title	Role	Venue	Notes	Ref.
1999	50 Revolutions	Tetley	Whitehall Theatre, London & UK Tour		
2000	The Servant of Two Masters	Clarice	Young Vic, London		
2001	The Tempest	Miranda	The Other Place, Stratford-upon-Avon & UK Tour		
2001	Top Girls	Kitty / Shona	Haymarket Theatre, Leicester & UK Tour		
2002	A Midsummer Night's Dream	Helena	Royal Shakespeare Theatre, Stratford-upon-Avon & UK Tour		
2003	World Music	Florence	Crucible Theatre, Sheffield		
2004	World Music	Florence	Donmar Warehouse, London		
2004	Twelfth Night	Viola	Bristol Old Vic, Bristol		
2007	Doubt	Mrs Muller	Tricycle Theatre, London		
2010	The Gods Weep	Beth	Hampstead Theatre, London		
2010	Welcome to Thebes	Eurydice	Olivier Theatre, London		
2010	The Children's Monologues	—N/a	The Old Vic, London	Charity performance in aid of Dramatic Need	
2012	The Trial of Ubu	The Interpreter	Hampstead Theatre, London		
2012	Love and Information	Ensemble	Royal Court Theatre, London		
2014	God Bless the Child	Ms Evitt	Royal Court Theatre, London		
2014	Birdland	Jenny	Royal Court Theatre, London		
2017	The Lady from the Sea	Ellida Wangel	Donmar Warehouse, London		
2026	Arcadia	Hannah Jarvis	Tom Stoppard Theatre, London		
