= List of Rome (TV series) characters =

Historical and fictional characters in HBO's Rome (2005-2007)

This is a list of characters from the HBO series Rome. The historical figures upon which certain characters are based are noted where appropriate.

== Main cast ==
The following are credited in the opening credits when they appear, with only Kevin McKidd, Ray Stevenson, Polly Walker, Kerry Condon and James Purefoy appearing in every episode. McKidd and Stevenson alternate top billing.

Character name	Portrayed by	Historical basis	Episodes
Lucius Vorenus	Kevin McKidd	Lucius Vorenus	1.1–2.10
Dedicated to his family and to traditional Roman values, he struggles to balance his personal beliefs, his duty to his superiors, and the needs of his family and friends. He is introduced as a veteran centurion of the 13th Legion to which he returns on promotion after commercial failures in civilian life. His rigid personality leads him to harsh treatment of his wife and children, which he subsequently regrets. He is briefly estranged from his children, though they reconcile before his death. He is mortally wounded in Egypt while defending Pullo and Caesarion, surviving long enough to return to die in Rome.
Titus Pullo	Ray Stevenson	Titus Pullo	1.1–2.10
The true definition of a rogue, Pullo is also humorous and faithful to his friends. He is introduced as a Roman soldier, serving under Vorenus. By the end of the series, he saves Caesarion (his son with Cleopatra, though no one else knows) and tells Octavian he is dead. Pullo is rewarded and presumably becomes very wealthy.
Atia of the Julii	Polly Walker	Atia/Clodia/Fulvia	1.1–2.10
Niece of Caesar and mother of Octavia of the Julii and Octavian. Condescending, manipulative, shrewd, willful, amoral, Atia advances her and her family's status in Roman society by any means, including sex and violence. Alternately affectionate and patronizing with her children, Atia develops genuine feelings for her lover Antony. In a culture where women lack formal power, Atia serves as a shadow ruler of Rome.
Pompey Magnus	Kenneth Cranham	Gnaeus Pompeius Magnus	1.1–1.8
An enemy of Caesar's who was once his ally and husband of his deceased daughter. Pompey is represented as a once highly popular and successful general, who now past his prime falls into uneasy alliance with the conservative patrician element in the Senate.
Servilia of the Junii	Lindsay Duncan	Servilia	1.1–2.5, 2.7
Sophisticated, elegant, and subtle, Servilla is from one of the founding families of Rome. Mother of Brutus and Caesar's mistress turned bitter enemy. Her longstanding feud with Caesar's niece Atia ends in violence and death.
Marcus Junius Brutus	Tobias Menzies	Marcus Junius Brutus the Younger	1.1–2.1, 2.3–2.6
Son of Servilia and filled with inner conflict. On the one hand he looks upon Caesar as a father figure, but he is also a descendant of a legendary founder of the Republic, Lucius Junius Brutus, who slew the tyrannical last king of Rome, Lucius Tarquinius Superbus, and is compelled by his mother to carry on this family legacy.
Octavia of the Julii	Kerry Condon	Octavia the Younger	1.1–2.10
The beautiful but weak-willed daughter of Atia, who uses her as a pawn to advance the family in Roman society. As such, Octavia is married to Antony but takes her brother's right-hand man Marcus Agrippa as her lover. Beneath the guise of a dutiful daughter and loving sister, Octavia shows keen intelligence and a simmering resentment.
Porcius Cato	Karl Johnson	Cato the Younger	1.1–1.5, 1.7, 1.9
A fiercely conservative leader of the Senate, Cato is as tough as he is old. He is the only member of the Senate to wear a black toga, which is symbolic of his mourning for what he sees as the death of the Roman Republic under Caesar's rule. More importantly he is an acerbic spokesman of conservatism and traditional interests, and an enemy to Caesar's faction.
Niobe	Indira Varma	Fictional	1.1–2.1, 2.3, 2.9
Niobe is the beautiful and proud wife of Vorenus. A strong character, who is left for eight years to bring up her two children while Vorenus is away on military service, Niobe is seduced by her brother-in-law and bears his illegitimate son. Much of the tension of the first season arises from her need to conceal this from an often inflexible husband who is unable to adjust from military life and not skilled in human relationships.
Marcus Tullius Cicero	David Bamber	Cicero	1.1–1.5, 1.7–1.8, 1.10, 1.12–2.6
A gifted orator, Cicero is the leader of the moderates in the Senate. He purports to stand for that which is principled and virtuous but increasingly becomes an opportunistic intriguer.
Gaius Octavian	Max Pirkis (1.1–2.2); Simon Woods (2.4–2.10)	Augustus	1.1–2.2, 2.4–2.10
Son of Atia and grandnephew of Caesar, Octavian is presented as a cold and highly intelligent youth who is a student of power and politics. Octavian is alternately pampered and patronized by his mother; his manhood and masculinity are seen as severely lacking by men and women alike. He is taken prisoner in Gaul while travelling to join Caesar, but saved by Vorenus and Pullo. Octavian is seen as a failure as a military strategist but he uses the accomplishments of his relatives as a means to further his political career and grows into an extremely cunning individual, who is able to defeat Antony and usher in the age of Empire.
Timon	Lee Boardman	Fictional	1.1, 1.3, 1.6, 1.9, 1.11, 2.1–2.8
A Roman Jewish horse trader who serves as an assassin and bodyguard for Atia. He accepts money as payment but prefers sex with Atia. He eventually rebuilds his relationship with his family and leaves with them for Judea.
Posca	Nicholas Woodeson	Fictional	1.1–1.2, 1.4–1.8, 1.10–2.2, 2.4, 2.6–2.9
Witty, intelligent, loyal and sarcastic, he is not only Caesar's slave, but also his confidant. He offers Caesar valuable advice, though Caesar often dismisses it as being slave talk. After the death of Caesar, Posca is freed by his will and becomes a close assistant to Mark Antony, though not an entirely faithful one.
Eleni	Suzanne Bertish	Fictional	1.1, 1.3–1.8, 1.10, 1.12–2.1, 2.3–2.5, 2.7
A slave completely dedicated to Servilia of the Junii.
Quintus Metellus Scipio	Paul Jesson	Quintus Caecilius Metellus Pius Scipio Nasica	1.1–1.5, 1.7, 1.9
Comrade and follower of the crusty Cato.
Mark Antony	James Purefoy	Marcus Antonius	1.1–2.10
Brave, dashing, and impulsive, Antony is a cunning and crass Roman general very popular with the Roman public. A loyal ally and close friend of Caesar, Antony becomes consul of Rome after Caesar's death, Atia's lover, and marries Octavia. Eventually he moves to Egypt, where he rules the Eastern Roman provinces and later commits suicide with his mistress Cleopatra.
Gaius Julius Caesar	Ciarán Hinds	Julius Caesar	1.1–2.1
An arrogant and brilliant general, Caesar is also a subtle politician. Intelligent, charming and calculating, he accomplishes most of what he sets out to do, until he becomes dictator of Rome for life and is violently murdered in the Roman Senate.
Vorena the Elder	Coral Amiga	Fictional	1.2–1.6, 1.9–2.10
She is the first daughter of Lucius Vorenus and Niobe. Vorena is the feminine form for names in the Voreni family. She is somewhat impulsive and, like her father Lucius Vorenus, has a bitter, unforgiving nature. In season 2, she and her siblings are kidnapped by Fulmen and sold into slavery, where Vorena was forced to work as a prostitute in a mine. After being rescued, she grows to hate her father for her mother's suicide and her enslavement (as they were kidnapped shortly after he "cursed" them for hiding Niobe's infidelity). Her aunt Lyde convinces her to remain with her father for the sake of Vorena the Younger and Lucius, but the Elder eventually betrays Vorenus to his rivals, prompting him to join Antony and flee to Egypt. Embittered against men in general, Vorena the Elder eventually takes holy vows at the temple where Lyde serves. She visits her siblings and Pullo regularly, having a cool but not negative attitude towards the latter. She is reconciled with her father as he lies on his deathbed. Seen in "How Titus Pullo Brought Down the Republic", "An Owl in a Thornbush", "Stealing from Saturn", "The Ram has Touched the Wall", "Egeria", "Utica", "Triumph", and "Kalends of February".
Clarissa	Anna Francolini	Fictional	1.2–1.6, 1.11–2.1
Niobe's friend and confidante.
Evander Pulchio	Enzo Cilenti	Fictional	1.3–1.5, 1.12
The husband of Lyde, brother-in-law of Niobe, and secretly the father of her son Lucius. He was killed by Pullo and Octavian, who after learning his secret realized that he would cause too many problems for Vorenus. Seen in "An Owl in a Thornbush", "Stealing from Saturn" and "The Ram has Touched the Wall".
Eirene	Chiara Mastalli	Fictional	1.3–1.6, 1.9–2.3, 2.6–2.8
Claimed by Pullo as his slave, but housed by Vorenus, she is the object of Pullo's affection.
Lyde	Esther Hall	Fictional	1.4–1.7, 1.9, 1.12–2.6, 2.9–2.10
Sister of Niobe, widow of Evander Pulchio, and business partner with the Vorenus family in a very profitable joint-venture butcher shop. She grows increasingly resentful of her sister's affair with her husband, eventually telling her that the only reason she is still talking to Niobe is because Vorenus would kill Lucius if he knew the truth. In season 2, she is captured and enslaved along with Niobe's children, but escapes and manages to return to Rome and tell Pullo what happened. While Vorenus and Pullo liberate the children, Lyde takes holy vows, bargaining her service to the gods in exchange for the children's deliverance. Vorenus later tells Lyde that she is free to visit the children whenever she wishes as long as she doesn't try to take them. When Vorena the Elder tries to run away, Lyde berates her and convinces her to give Vorenus another chance, even if that chance is only for the safe and relatively affluent life he offers. Seen in "An Owl in a Thornbush", "Stealing from Saturn", "The Ram has Touched the Wall", "Egeria", "Pharsalus" and "Utica".
Quintus Pompey	Rick Warden	Fictional/Sextus Pompey/Gnaeus Pompeius	1.4, 1.10, 1.12–2.1
Filled with vindictive malice, he is the son of Pompey. A fictional character, Quintus Pompey is a violent and sadistic figure who shows little of his father's qualities.
Erastes Fulmen	Lorcan Cranitch	Fictional	1.4–1.5, 1.9–1.11, 2.1
Crime leader of Rome. He becomes an enemy of Vorenus after the latter refuses to work for him and even strikes one of his henchmen. In season 2, Fulmen has the Vorenus's children and sister-in-law kidnapped and sold into slavery. When Vorenus and Pullo track him down, Fulmen claims the family is dead before being killed.
Calpurnia	Haydn Gwynne	Calpurnia Pisonis	1.4–1.5, 1.10, 1.12–2.1
The wife of Julius Caesar, she is seen in "Stealing from Saturn", "The Ram has Touched the Wall", "Kalends of February" and "Passover". In Shakespeare's and Plutarch's version, it is Calpurnia's dreams that almost stop Caesar on the Ides of March, alluded to by the flock of birds in the shape of a skull in "Kalends of February".
Cassius	Guy Henry	Gaius Cassius Longinus	1.10, 2.1, 2.3–2.6
Is quite successful in his ability to persuade Brutus to consider Caesar's intentions. Following the assassination of Caesar, wages war against Antony and Octavian with Brutus. His death at the Battle of Philippi prompts Brutus to kill himself.
Newsreader	Ian McNeice	Fictional/Works of Quintilian	1.1–1.12 (guest), 2.1–2.4, 2.7–2.10
Roman herald announcing state-sponsored news to Roman citizens and residents. As he reads tablets containing the news, the herald uses hand and arm gestures (chironomia) to signify and emphasize particular aspects of the news.
Gaia	Zuleikha Robinson	Fictional	2.2–2.3, 2.5–2.9
The former supervisor at a brothel who kept the customers in line, Gaia negotiates a similar job with better pay with Vorenus, now the leader of the Aventine. She becomes somewhat involved with Mascius, but also shows an opportunistic interest in both Vorenus and Pullo. Gaia makes an enemy of Pullo's wife Eirene, who compels Pullo to beat an insubordinate Gaia in "Death Mask"; he roughs her up, but with her encouragement ends up having rough sex with her as well. Later, Gaia acquires an abortion-inducing herb called silphium, which she administers surreptitiously to Eirene in her tea in "A Necessary Fiction". Eirene miscarries, and then dies (apparently of blood loss). In "Deus Impeditio Esuritori Nullus (No God Can Stop a Hungry Man)", Gaia and Pullo have been in a relationship for a few years; she is mortally wounded saving him from an attack by Memmio, and on her deathbed admits that she killed Eirene. Pullo strangles her to death, and throws her body unceremoniously into the river. Gaia appeared in "Son of Hades", "These Being the Words of Marcus Tullius Cicero", "Heroes of the Republic", "Philippi", "Death Mask", and "A Necessary Fiction".
Cleopatra	Lyndsey Marshal	Cleopatra	1.8 (guest), 2.2, 2.8–2.10
The powerful, strong-willed queen of Egypt secured her grip on the throne by consummating her liaison with Caesar and overthrowing her brother Ptolemy XIII. After a passionate night with Pullo, she gives birth to a son, Caesarion, publicly claiming Caesar is the father. She later becomes Antony's mistress and mother of his twins Cleopatra Selene and Alexander Helios.
Duro	Rafi Gavron	Fictional	2.2, 2.3, 2.4
A slave who is hired by Servilia to poison Atia.
Levi	Nigel Lindsay	Fictional	2.2–2.7
Brother of Timon, outspoken zealot Levi comes to Rome from Jerusalem in Season 2, after getting himself into political trouble in Judea. Religious and resentful of the Romans as well as Jewish collaborators with Rome, he soon helps a troubled and conflicted Timon rediscover his Judaism. Unfortunately, Levi's assassination attempt on Herod of Judea in "Death Mask" comes to a tragic end.
Mascius	Michael Nardone	Fictional	2.2–2.10
An old comrade of Pullo and Vorenus, he comes to the Aventine in "Son of Hades" seeking work under Vorenus as his third in command behind Pullo. He first appears in "The Spoils", and later returns in "Son of Hades", "These Being the Words of Marcus Tullius Cicero", "Testudo et Lepus (The Tortoise and the Hare)", and "Heroes of the Republic".
Memmio	Daniel Cerqueira	Fictional	2.2–2.3, 2.5–2.9
Captain of one of the largest underworld gangs, the Caelians; keeps an uneasy alliance with Vorenus, leader of the Aventine. When it is discovered that he stole gold destined for Antony, Titus Pullo's and Memmio's respective gangs fight and Memmio's tongue is bitten off by Pullo, who then keeps him in a cage to remind others to remain loyal.
Acerbo	Alan Williams	Fictional	2.2, 2.6, 2.8–2.9
The criminal captain of the Oppian Colleges.
Marcus Agrippa	Allen Leech	Marcus Vipsanius Agrippa	2.3–2.10
Longtime friend of Gaius Octavian and Gaius Maecenas, Agrippa is one of the adult Octavian's chief advisors. He becomes Octavia's lover but is soon regretted by her.
Jocasta	Camilla Rutherford	Fictional	2.3–2.9
Daughter of a wealthy merchant named Rufus Tranquillus, and friend to Octavia; introduced in "These Being the Words of Marcus Tullius Cicero". Atia later adds Jocasta's father to the list of nobles Octavian and Mark Antony proscribe. Her entire family is murdered and it is implied she was sexually assaulted and/or raped before she was able to escape. In "Death Mask", Atia arranges for Jocasta's marriage to Posca; Jocasta is initially reluctant but soon becomes quite happy with him, delighted with his kindness and generosity in "A Necessary Fiction". In "Deus Impeditio Esuritori Nullus (No God Can Stop a Hungry Man)", Jocasta has joined her husband in his relocation with Mark Antony to Egypt, but both escape back to Rome on Atia and Octavia's ship because Posca realizes that war between Antony and Octavian is inevitable, in addition to the fact that life under the caprices of Cleopatra and a frequently drunk and/or stoned Mark Antony is an intolerably dangerous one.
Gaius Maecenas	Alex Wyndham	Gaius Maecenas	2.4–2.10
Maecenas first appears in "Testudo et Lepus (The Tortoise and the Hare)"; he is a poet and longtime friend of Gaius Octavian and Marcus Agrippa, and one of Octavian's chief advisers and speechwriters. Maecenas is cheerfully corrupt, at one point conspiring with Posca to steal a portion of Herod's bribe to Mark Antony. He frequently indulges in orgies and narcotics, attends to a cadre of spies, keeps pleasure slaves of both sexes, and shows no hesitance when faced with moral quandaries.
Lepidus	Ronan Vibert	Marcus Aemilius Lepidus	2.5, 2.7–2.8
General under Mark Antony, one of the Second Triumvirate. He is given Africa when the Republic is divided amongst the triumvirs, and later falls out of prominence as his territories are annexed first by Mark Antony and later Octavian. The historical Lepidus initially intended to contest Octavian's claim to dominance, but was talked out of it - to his benefit, as he died of old age much, much later, having been unmolested during the transition from republic to empire.

== Guest actors ==
Character name	Portrayed by	Historical basis	Episode(s)
Merula	Lydia Biondi	Fictional	1.1–1.6, 1.9–1.10, 1.12–2.5, 2.7–2.10
Atia's personal slave, who also acts as her confidante.
Castor	Manfredi Aliquò	Fictional	1.1–1.6, 1.11, 2.1–2.7, 2.9–2.10
Atia's house slave.
Rubio	Alessio Di Cesare (1.1–1.6); David Quinzi (1.9–1.12)	Fictional	1.1–1.2, 1.5–1.6, 1.9–1.12
A slave brought back from Gaul by Vorenus, he falls ill and is taken to Niobe for care. He appears in episodes "The Stolen Eagle", "How Titus Pullo Brought Down the Republic", "The Ram has Touched the Wall", and "Egeria", as well as "Utica", "Triumph", "The Spoils", and "Kalends of February".
Vercingetorix	Giovanni Calcagno	Vercingetorix	1.1, 1.10
"King of the Gauls," he appears in "The Stolen Eagle" and "Triumph".
Curial Magistrate	John Boswall	Fictional	1.1–1.2, 1.6, 1.10
An elderly Senate speaker. He is seen in most Senate scenes of the first season. Then he disappears from series without any mentions of his fate. In "These Being the Words of Marcus Tullius Cicero" the Senate has another speaker (who gets killed by Mark Antony in the first scene he appears).
Glabius	Roberto Purvis	Fictional	1.1–1.3
The first husband of Octavia of the Julii, divorced by Atia's force of will, still loved by Octavia, and therefore killed by Timon on Atia's orders. He is seen in "The Stolen Eagle", "How Titus Pullo Brought Down the Republic", "An Owl in a Thornbush", and "Stealing from Saturn". Historically, Octavia the Younger was six years older than her brother Gaius Octavian, and from c.54 to 40BC (the first season's timeframe was 51 to 41 BC) was the wife of Gaius Claudius Marcellus. Therefore, she would have been in his household, not that of the Julii/Octavii, until his death in 40 and her remarriage to Mark Antony. Marcellus has been replaced by the fictional Glabius.
Vorena the Younger	Anna Fausta Primiano (1.2–2.4); Valery Usai (2.5–2.10)	Fictional	1.2, 1.4–1.6, 1.9–2.10
She is the second daughter of Lucius Vorenus and Niobe. During the entire run of the series, she only utters sounds thrice: initially, at the beginning of "Egeria" when she makes a yelping noise whilst playing hide and seek with the family's young Gaulish slave; then twice in "Heroes of the Republic", first she catches Vorena the Elder's attention while riding in the back of a wagon by saying, "Sister!" and later excitedly exclaims "Lyde!" upon seeing her aunt for the first time after her rescue from slavery. At the end of the series, she is credited by Pullo for all but running the Collegium tavern. Pullo says she has the "glare of Medusa". Seen in "How Titus Pullo Brought Down the Republic", "An Owl in a Thornbush", "Stealing from Saturn", "The Ram has Touched the Wall", "Egeria", "Utica", and "Triumph".
Publius Servilius	Simon Callow	Publius Servilius Isauricus	1.6
Caesar's Co-Consul in 48 BC.
Lysandros	Vincenzo Nicoli	Fictional	1.7
A Greek bandit who was killed by Lucius Vorenus. His only appearance is in "Pharsalus".
Ptolemy XIII	Scott Chisholm	Ptolemy XIII of Egypt	1.8
Cleopatra's younger brother, seen in the episode "Caesarion". Historically he was as young as is portrayed, and the character's "chubbiness" is an allusion to a family trait of the Ptolemaic dynasty as historically attested in their artistic representations, nicknames and in the literary record, namely Ptolemy VIII Physcon.
Pothinus	Tony Guilfoyle	Pothinus	1.8
A eunuch who serves as regent to Ptolemy XIII. Seen in the episode "Caesarion".
Charmian	Kathryn Hunter	Charmian	1.8, 2.2, 2.9–2.10
Cleopatra's dedicated slave and advisor.
Lucius	Marco Pollack (1.9–1.12); Alessio Cuna (2.1–2.8); Stefan Brown (2.9–2.10)	Fictional	1.9–2.6, 2.8–2.10
Son of Niobe and Evander Pulchio, a fact that was hidden from Lucius Vorenus until the "Kalends of February". Until then, Vorenus was led to believe the boy was his grandson by his eldest daughter Vorena the Elder. Vorenus accepts the child in later episodes, happily embracing him after he believed his children were dead. In "De Patre Vostro (About Your Father)", Pullo says that Lucius is apprenticed to a stonemason, which Vorenus approves of. Appears in "How Titus Pullo Brought Down the Republic", "An Owl in a Thornbush", "Stealing from Saturn", "The Ram has Touched the Wall", "Egeria", "Utica", and "Kalends of February".
Casca	Peter Gevisser	Servilius Casca	1.12
A Roman senator and one of the assassins of Julius Caesar.
Deborah	Amy Marston	Fictional	2.2–2.4, 2.7–2.8
The Judean wife of Timon and mother of their 3 children.
Caesarion	Nicolò Brecci (2.2); Max Baldry (2.8–2.10)	Ptolemy XV of Egypt/Caesarion	2.2, 2.8–2.10
Seen in the last few minutes of the episode "Caesarion" as a newborn baby, Caesarion is the son of Julius Caesar and Cleopatra. The storyline implies that Caesarion is actually the son of Titus Pullo. The character returns as a young boy (portrayed by Nicolò Brecci) in the episode "Son of Hades", in which Cleopatra asks Mark Antony to publicly declare him Caesar's son (though not his heir). Max Baldry assumes the role in "Deus Impeditio Esuritori Nullus (No God Can Stop a Hungry Man)" (though he appears briefly in the background of a scene in "A Necessary Fiction"), in which Caesarion befriends Lucius Vorenus, who is serving Mark Antony in Egypt. Caesarion asks the soldier about his "father"; he of course means Julius Caesar, but Vorenus' answers seem to hint that he believes Pullo to be the boy's father. In the series finale "De Patre Vostro (About Your Father)", it is made clear that both Pullo and Vorenus believe this to be true, and Cleopatra herself later confirms that Pullo is the father. Vorenus manages to smuggle Caesarion out of the palace as Octavian takes over, knowing Octavian will murder the boy to cement his position as Caesar's sole heir. Pullo brings his son to Rome under the name Aeneas, and tells Octavian that he has murdered young Caesarion. The series ends with the indication that Pullo is about to tell the boy that he is in fact his father.
Omnipor	Rocky Marshall	Fictional	2.6–2.8
Works for Memmio of the Caelians; romances Vorena the Elder, daughter of Vorenus, with questionable intentions. After his treachery is revealed, he is seemingly killed by an axe thrown by Pullo in "A Necessary Fiction".
Herod	René Zagger	Herod the Great	2.7
Prince of Judea and Tetrarch of Galilee. He comes to Rome in "Death Mask" to offer Mark Antony a "gift" of gold in exchange for Rome's assistance in Herod's ascension to the throne of Judea. Levi and Timon planned to assassinate him during the marriage festivities of Mark Antony and Octavia; however, the two brothers have a falling out in which Levi is mortally wounded with his own knife by Timon and the attempt is never made.
Livia Drusilla	Alice Henley	Livia Drusilla	2.8–2.10
Young wife of Octavian; introduced in "A Necessary Fiction". Married to another man Claudius Nero (historically Tiberius Claudius Nero), Livia catches the eye of Octavian; she and her mother Alfidia are pleased when he insists that Livia divorce her current husband to marry him. Octavian introduces her to his family at the same meeting where he berates his friends and relatives for all the vices that are potentially damaging to him; Octavia warns Livia that she is about to marry a monster, but the girl is unfazed. Later Octavian explains that he has rough sexual tastes, but Livia takes this in stride: in "Deus Impeditio Esuritori Nullus (No God Can Stop a Hungry Man)," Livia actively participates in mutually sadomasochistic sex with him. Despite her outward behavior of being slightly dim, she is in private moments as politically astute as Octavian. In "De Patre Vostro (About Your Father)", Octavian's mother Atia of the Julii puts social climber Livia in her place, calling her a "vicious trollop" and asserting her dominance over Livia.
Alfidia	Deborah Moore	Alfidia	2.8, 2.10
The mother of Livia, she is present in "A Necessary Fiction" when a married Livia catches the eye of young Octavian, and both women are pleased when he insists that Livia divorce her current husband to marry him. Later, in "De Patre Vostro (About Your Father)", Alfidia lightly questions Octavia's loyalty to her family at dinner (Octavia defends herself handily), and is present when Atia of the Julii finally puts daughter-in-law Livia in her place.
Antonia	Unknown infant actor	Antonia the Elder/Antonia Minor	2.10
Daughter of Mark Antony and Octavia of the Julii born after Antony left Rome and raised by her mother alone. She could possibly be the daughter of Marcus Agrippa. Octavia complains of her being a disobedient child.
