= Scott Chisholm (actor) =

English actor and television presenter (born 1993)

- Born: 20 September 1993 (age 33); Enfield, London, England
- Occupations: Actor, television presenter
- Years active: 1998–present

Scott Chisholm (born 20 September 1993) is an English actor and television presenter.

== Early life ==
Born in Enfield, London, Chisholm attended St. Andrew's C of E Primary School and Davenant Foundation School. His mother Julia (née Lawrence) is a dance teacher who attended the Arts Educational School before herself performing professionally. It was through her teaching that Chisholm gained an agent at the age of three years old.

== Career ==
After two years' work in advertising, Chisholm made his professional debut at age five as a presenter during the "Small People" segment of BBC Future Generations, a charity programme to benefit Children in Need. He subsequently began presenting for BBC Holiday in Kenya. He was one of three children who appeared in all episodes of the comedy series The Giblet Boys (2005).

== Filmography ==
=== Film ===
| Year | Title | Role | Notes |
|---|---|---|---|
| 2004 | Things to Do Before You're 30 | Joe | |
| 2006 | Stormbreaker | Boy in Hamleys | Uncredited |

=== Television ===
| Year | Title | Role | Notes |
|---|---|---|---|
| 1998 | BBC Future Generations | Himself | Presenter of segment "Small People" |
| 2000 | Casualty | Harry Butler | Episode: "On the Edge" |
| 2001 | Murder in Mind | Craig Squires | Episode: "Neighbours" |
| 2005 | The Giblet Boys | Pud | |
| 2005 | Rome | King Ptolemy XIII | Episode: "Caesarion" |
| 2007 | Time Shift | Himself | Episode: "Goodbye Children Everywhere: The Changing World of Children's Television" |
