= William J. Macdonald (filmmaker) =

American film and television producer and writer

William J. Macdonald is an American film and television producer and writer.

== Career ==
Macdonald has an undergraduate degree from Georgetown University and a Juris Doctor degree from the Fordham University School of Law in New York.

Macdonald worked in international trade and business affairs. Eventually he rose to run Hollywood producer Robert Evans' production company at Paramount Pictures.

Macdonald has a producer, co-producer or executive producer credit on Sliver, Jade, An Occasional Hell, Rough Riders, Molly and One Man's Hero. He co-wrote one episode for the TNT series, Witchblade, which ran from 2001–2002.

He was also a co-creator of the HBO original series Rome (in association of the BBC) along with John Milius and Bruno Heller. MacDonald served as an executive producer and writer on the series. The episode "Caesarion" (2005) was written by Macdonald.

Macdonald also wrote a drama series about the history of New Orleans called Storyville that had begun filming a pilot by January 2016.

Macdonald wrote an unproduced screenplay based on Iris Chang's novel The Rape of Nanking.

== Filmography ==
He was a producer in all films unless otherwise noted.

=== Film ===
Year	Film	Credit
1993	Sliver	Co-producer
1995	Jade	Executive producer
1996	An Occasional Hell	Executive producer
1997	The Saint	
1999	Molly	
1999	One Man's Hero	
2017	Grow House	Executive producer

As an actor

Year	Film	Role
1996	An Occasional Hell	Arresting Officer #1

=== Television ===
Year	Title	Credit	Notes
1997	Rough Riders	Executive producer	Television film
2005−07	Rome	Executive producer	
2017	The Saint	Executive producer	Television film

As writer

Year	Title
2002	Witchblade
2005−07	Rome
