= Vorenus and Pullo =

Centurions of the Roman army

Lucius Vorenus
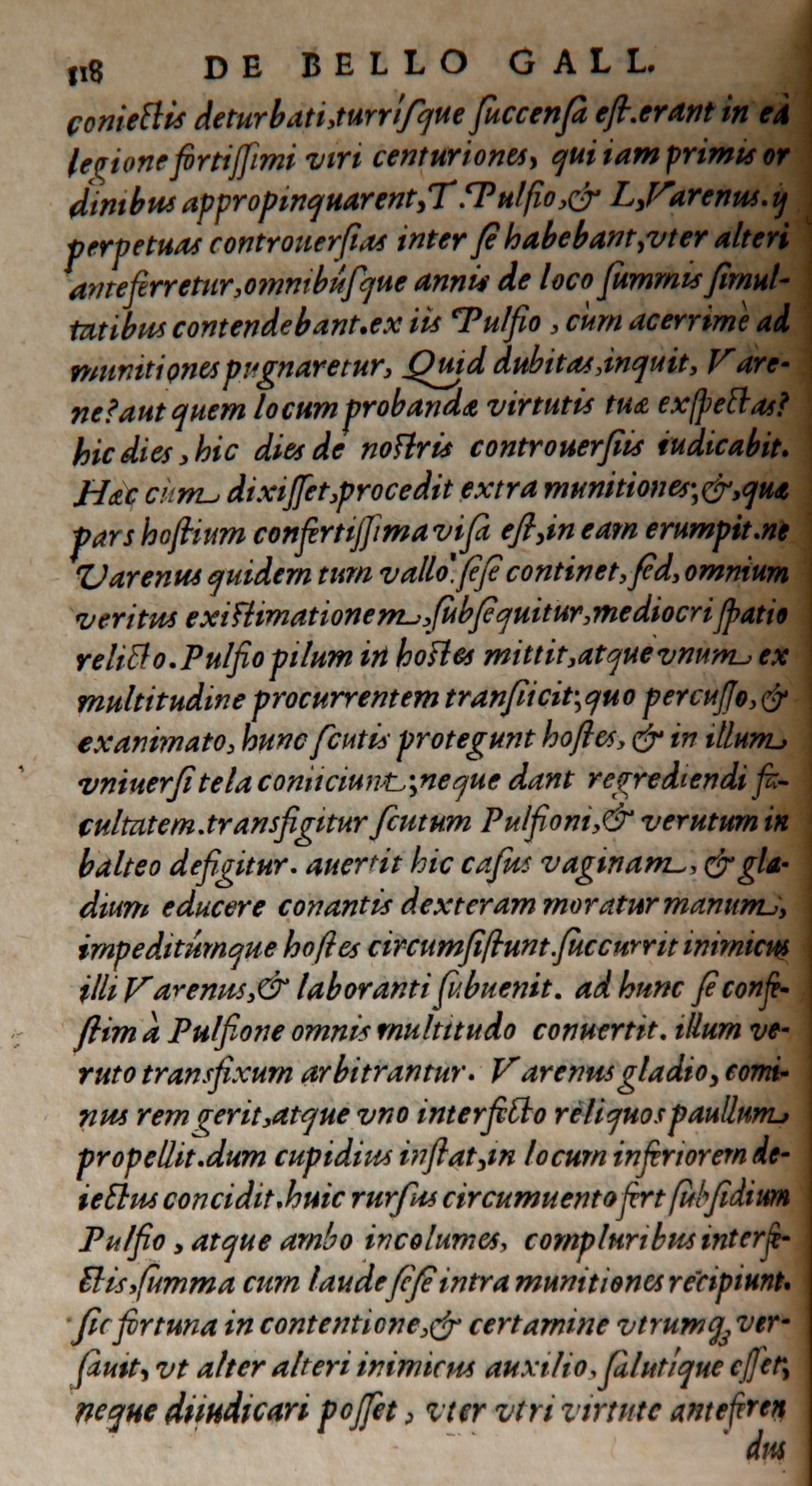
- A page (p. 118) of Julius Caesar's Commentarii de Bello Gallico with description of actions of T. Pulfio & L. Varenus
- Military career
- Allegiance: Julius Caesar
- Rank: Centurion
- Unit: Legio XI Claudia

Titus Pullo
- Military career
- Allegiance: Julius Caesar, later Pompey
- Rank: Centurion
- Units: Legio XI Claudia; Legio XXI Victrix Rapax
- Conflicts: Battle of Pharsalus

Lucius Vorenus and Titus Pullo were two Roman centurions mentioned in the personal writings of Julius Caesar. Although it is sometimes stated they were members of the 11th Legion (Legio XI Claudia), Caesar never states the number of the legion concerned, giving only the words in ea legione ("in that legion"). All that is known is that the legion in which they served under Caesar was one commanded at the time by Quintus Cicero.

== Known life ==
Vorenus and Pullo appear in Caesar's Commentarii de Bello Gallico, Book 5, Chapter 44. The episode describes the two as centurions, approaching the first ranks, who shared a bitter personal rivalry, and takes place in 54 BC when the Nervii attacked the legion under Quintus Cicero in their winter quarters in Nervian territory.

In an effort to outdo Vorenus, Pullo charged out of the fortified camp and attacked the enemy. Pullo cast his javelin into one of the enemies from a short distance, but his belt was simultaneously pierced by a spear, preventing him from drawing his sword, and he was surrounded by other Nervii. Just then, Vorenus, following Pullo from the fortifications, reached the site of the mêlée and engaged the enemy in hand-to-hand combat. After slaying one of the enemy and driving back the rest, Vorenus lost his footing on the irregular terrain. As the Nervii drew closer to him, Pullo came to his aid. After slaying many of their opponents, the two retreated to the fortifications amidst roaring applause from their comrades, or "covered with glory" as described by Caesar.

Vorenus then disappears from history. However, it is known that in the Civil War of 49 BC Pullo was assigned to the XXI Victrix Rapax, a new Italian legion commanded by the legate Gaius Antonius. In 48 BC, Antonius was blockaded on an island and forced to surrender; Pullo was apparently responsible for most of his soldiers switching sides to fight for Pompey. Later that year, he is recorded bravely defending Pompey's camp in Greece from Caesar's attack shortly before the Battle of Pharsalus.

== Fictional depictions ==
- Lucius Vorenus and Titus Pullo are principal characters in the HBO/BBC/RAI original television series Rome. Vorenus is played by actor Kevin McKidd and Pullo by Ray Stevenson. Unlike the historical centurions, the fictional characters are members of the 13th Legion (Legio XIII Gemina), an ally of Caesar, and particularly of Octavian. Vorenus is shown as more conservative, stoic and morally ambiguous, while Pullo is portrayed as a rowdy yet honourable soldier. Pullo does not defect to Pompey.
- Lucius Vorenus and Titus Pullo can both be earned as retainers, adding status bonus for playable characters in the computer game Total War: Rome II. Their description and included quotes are directly pulled from the television series Rome.
- Lucius Vorenus and Titus Pullo are minor characters in Caesar, the fifth book in Colleen McCullough's Masters of Rome series. They are shown as Centurions, serving under Quintus Cicero, commander of the Ninth Legion (Legio IX Hispana).
- Vorenus and Pullo appear in the Legion tetralogy of the Videssos Cycle by Harry Turtledove. The novels recount the adventures of several maniples of Caesar's legions in Gaul that are whisked away by druid spells to a land of magic loosely based on the Byzantine Empire. The two companions are fairly faithful to Caesar's portrayal, starting as rival legionaries before rising to centurion rank and becoming fast friends.
- Vorenus and Pullo appear as hireable praetorians in the 2022 PC game Expeditions: Rome.
- Both appear in the second book of the Marius' Mules series by S.J.A. Turney. Pullo is the senior centurion (Primus Pilus) of the XIII while Vorenus was the Pilus Prior (Centurion of cohort his first century is attached).
