= Coral Amiga =

English actress

Coral Amiga is an English actress and screenwriter born in London. She is best known for her portrayal of Vorena the Elder, in the television series Rome. After attending The American School in London, she went on to receive a bachelor's degree at New York University Tisch School of the Arts.

The miniseries Southcliffe, in which she played the role of Mattie, was nominated for a BAFTA award in 2014. In 2020 Amiga wrote and starred in a short horror thriller, MJ, directed by Jamie Delaney which was screened at the Fantasia International Film Festival, the London Short Film Festival, and the Brooklyn Horror Film Festival. Also in 2020 Amiga and Nicole Hartley wrote, and starred in, a short film called Bored that was directed by Georgia Oakley. It was a TV pilot that was selected for the 2020 SXSW Festival, until the festival was cancelled, but did continue to receive positive reviews from critics including going on to win the Best Series at the London Short Series Festival and being awarded a Vimeo Staff Pick. Hartley and Amiga collaborated on a further short film, Bug, for Hulu’s ‘Bite Size Halloween’ in 2022.

== Filmography ==
Year	Film	Role	Notes
2005-2007	Rome	Vorena the Elder	
2009	The Sexton's Wife	Elizabeth	Short film by Marco Piana
2012	Dead Europe	Yvette	
2013	Southcliffe	Mattie	
2014	I Open My Eyes and I See Something	Sarah	
2016	Utopic Dystopia		
2020	MJ	MJ	writer and lead actress
2020	Bored	Jamie	Co-written with Nicole Hartley
2022	Bug		Co-written and directed with Nicole Hartley
TBA	Kill The Czar	TBA	
