= The Stolen Eagle =

- Rome episode
- Episode no.: Season 1 Episode 1
- Directed by: Michael Apted
- Written by: Bruno Heller
- Original air date: August 28, 2005

Episode chronology
← Previous —	Next → "How Titus Pullo Brought Down the Republic"

"The Stolen Eagle" is the series premiere of the British-American historical drama television series Rome. Written by series creator Bruno Heller and directed by Michael Apted, the episode first aired in the United States on Home Box Office (HBO) on August 28, 2005, and on the BBC in the United Kingdom and Ireland on November 2. Rome was given a budget of $100 million, making it the largest amount both networks had ever spent on a series. Heller centered the series' narrative on the perspectives of two common soldiers, similar to Rosencrantz and Guildenstern from Shakespeare's Hamlet. Apted shot the episode at Cinecittà, the Roman studio where the epic films Ben-Hur and Cleopatra were filmed. On the set, realism and authenticity were emphasized more than grandiosity, with depictions of a cosmopolitan city of all social classes.

As the wars in Gaul come to an end, Julius Caesar (Ciarán Hinds) is faced with both triumph and tribulation. On the heels of his victory comes news of his daughter's death. Awarded with the adulation of the people, he also garners the enmity of politicians in Rome, including Pompey the Great (Kenneth Cranham). In Rome, Pompey must balance honor and politics as he is urged to betray his former friend. Meanwhile, Caesar's niece Atia of the Julii (Polly Walker) tries to steer her family on the dangerous path between the growing divisions of power. In the Gallic countryside, two unlikely allies (Kevin McKidd and Ray Stevenson) journey to reclaim the stolen standard of the Roman legion.

HBO described its marketing strategy as "its largest, most aggressive for a new series," and media outlets estimated its cost at $10 million. On its first broadcast, an estimated 3.8 million US viewers watched the episode. On its first airing in the UK and Ireland, it secured an estimated audience of 6.6 million people. Critical reception was largely mixed, with several reviewers writing that the episode suffered from slow storytelling. "The Stolen Eagle" garnered four major awards, including the Primetime Emmy Award for Outstanding Special Visual Effects and the Directors Guild of America Award for Outstanding Directing – Drama Series.

== Plot ==
During the Siege of Alesia in 52 BC, Centurion Lucius Vorenus of the 13th Legion commands his men as Gallic warriors fall on his line. In contrast to the Gauls' chaotic charge, the Romans fight using a tight and well-organized shield wall, until one drunk legionary, Titus Pullo, breaks ranks and charges into the crowd of Gauls. Vorenus rescues and angrily orders him back into formation, and Pullo strikes him. Later, the assembled soldiers watch as Pullo is flogged and condemned to death for his disorderly conduct.

The day after, the Gallic chieftain Vercingetorix is brought before Julius Caesar and made to surrender, ending the eight-year-long Gallic Wars. Caesar's niece, Atia of the Julii, orders her son Octavian to deliver a horse she has purchased straight to Caesar in Gaul to ensure that he remembers them above all other well-wishers. Caesar himself receives news that his daughter Julia, married to his friend Gnaeus Pompeius Magnus with whom he shares power in Rome, has died in childbirth along with her stillborn daughter. Fearing the loss of their friendship, Caesar and his general, Mark Antony, muse that they must find Pompey a new wife.

In the Roman Senate, Cato the Younger moves that Caesar is stripped of his command and recalled to Rome to answer charges of abusing his office and illegal warmongering. Pompey, as sole Consul present, vetoes the motion and declares his faith in Caesar's leadership. At the theater that night, Metellus Scipio introduces his daughter Cornelia Metella to Pompey as a prospective wife, while Cato warns him that he must ally against Caesar before it is too late. Pompey again asserts that Caesar means no harm, although privately, he is troubled by Caesar's rising prestige and gives orders to one of his slaves who is leaving on a trip to Gaul. At night in the encampment of the 13th Legion, the Aquila is stolen by Gallic brigands. To avoid a potentially disastrous drop in morale, Antony orders Vorenus to retrieve it. As Vorenus feels the mission is doomed to failure, he has the condemned Pullo released from the stockade to assist him.

In camp, Caesar welcomes Marcus Junius Brutus, his unofficial stepson whose mother is Caesar's lover, Servilia of the Junii. Later, at a party hosted by Servilia, Brutus confides to Pompey that the loss of the eagle has induced the 13th Legion to plot mutiny against Caesar. On the road to Caesar's camp in Gaul, Octavian is abducted by highwaymen. For Caesar's request, Atia instructs her daughter Octavia to marry Pompey by first divorcing her husband Glabius, despite Octavia's protests that they are deeply in love. Atia then presents Octavia to Pompey at a party and offers her for premarital relations, which Pompey takes advantage of.

Vorenus and Pullo set off in search of the eagle, encountering and rescuing Octavian from his captors. Octavian thanks them and promises that they will be rewarded. Vorenus and Pullo discover Pompey's slave trying to escape with the eagle in a cart, realizing that Pompey arranged the theft to discredit Caesar. A politically astute Octavian notes that his uncle will be quick to exploit the situation: Civil war between Caesar and Pompey is inevitable, but Caesar needs Pompey to make the first move so as not to appear the aggressor; Pompey is likely to do that if he believes Caesar's soldiers are on the verge of desertion. The trio returns in triumph to camp, where a surprised yet grateful Caesar takes the eagle back as proof of Pompey's hostility. He sends Pompey the head of his slave and informs him of his next move, to winter the 13th Legion at Ravenna on the Italian border, while making it clear that he intends to press his right to the Consulship. Pompey breaks all ties with Caesar and takes Cornelia as his new wife. Octavia, humiliated at being used by Pompey and heartbroken over her pointless divorce, says she wants him dead.

== Production ==
=== Conception and writing ===
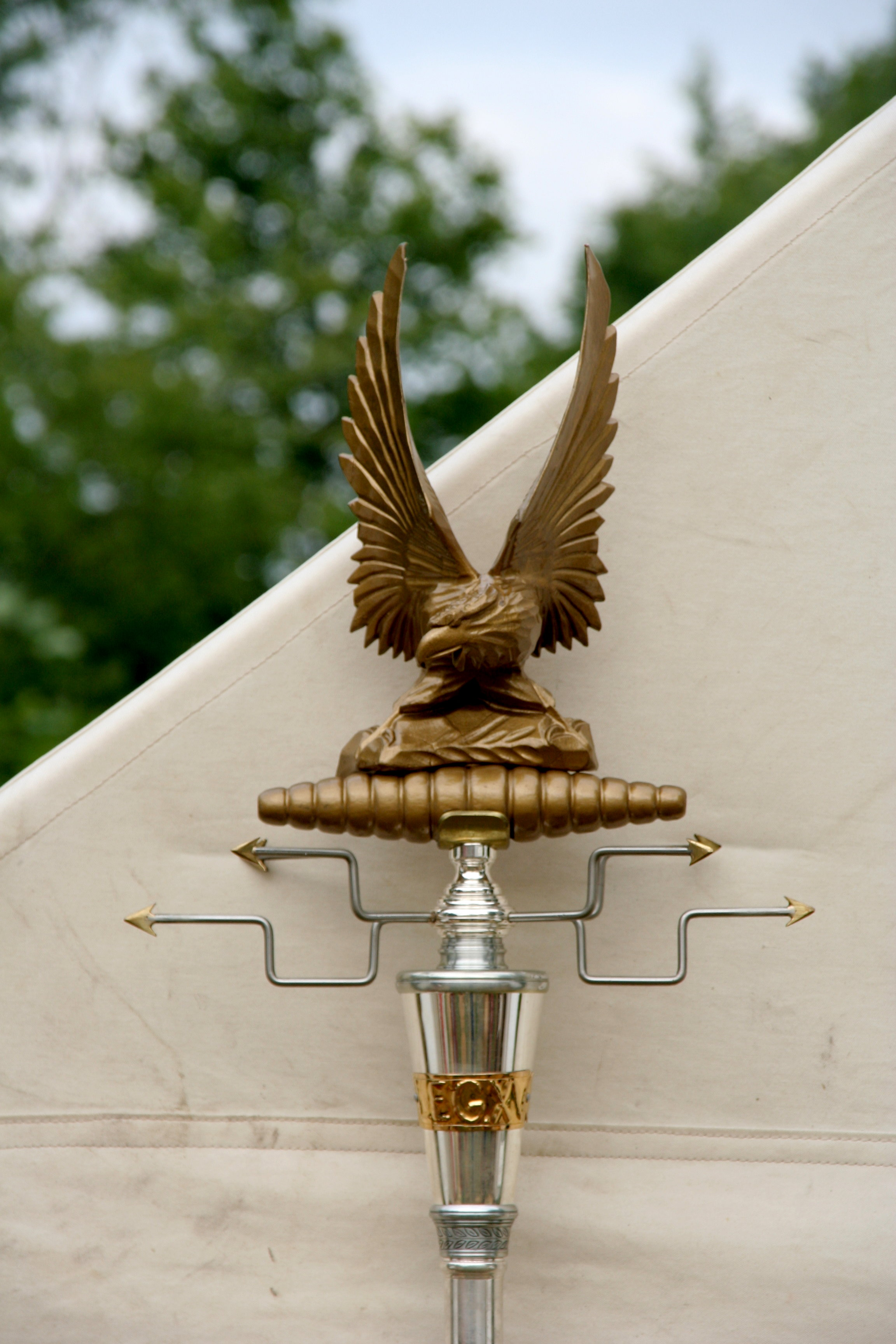
A Roman Aquila, the "eagle" of The Stolen Eagle

"The Stolen Eagle" was written by executive producer and co-creator Bruno Heller and directed by Michael Apted, who also directed the following two episodes. Heller said the era of the Roman Empire was "pivotal in Western history. If things hadn't turned out the way they did at that particular point, the world that we live in now would be very different." He decided to tell the story of the series from the perspectives of two common soldiers, Lucius Vorenus and Titus Pullo. According to Heller, "They are the only two ordinary soldiers mentioned by Caesar in his book, so the idea was to do a sort of Rosencrantz, and Guildenstern take. I essentially took the seed of that idea to try to tell a big historical epic, but from the street level, the everyman's point of view."

The episode title is a reference to the standard of the Roman legion, a symbol that represents the legion's unity. While the storyline detailing its theft was based on fiction, Heller believed that it showed how Caesar could turn "misfortune into opportunity. He was always one step ahead of his enemies." Certain characters were changed from their traditional images; for instance, while Brutus has been portrayed as the noblest Roman, Heller and historical consultant Jonathan Stamp thought it would be interesting to have him forced into his later role through his ancestry. Alluding to the fact that Brutus' great great great grandfather "drove the last king out of Rome", Stamp said that "his family history was pushing him in one direction, his emotions in another."

=== Casting ===
The producers cast relatively unknown British and Irish actors for the series. Scottish actress Lindsay Duncan, who was cast as Servilia, believed that she and other UK actors "can do old, can do classic, and you believe it." She also said that because of long distances, American actors or those of other nationalities were avoided: "Transporting actors from [Los Angeles] to Rome on a regular basis does not look good for the budget. We're quite cheap." Stamp described Servilia as "the great love of [Julius] Caesar's life, his mistress and by all counts the only woman he truly loved." Irish actor Ciarán Hinds was cast as Caesar. Hinds first thought it was "silly" to be offered the part, but then, "you think it's quite an honour to be chosen to play it. And then you think, 'Oh shit I've got to do it', and then, well, 'I suppose someone has to do it!'" Heller had believed that Hinds would make "a great Caesar" for a long time, and considered the series "extremely lucky" for being able to cast him.

Scottish actor Kevin McKidd, who had never appeared in a television series that necessitated over twelve months of filming, was cast as Lucius Vorenus, one of the lead characters. McKidd said, "What was different about this show is you get 14 months to really get into every nook and cranny of the character, in a way you don't get a chance to explore when you do a movie or a theater play. Initially, it was a terrifying prospect. But once you got over that, you realize what a great opportunity it was." Heller described his character as "very much a Roman of the Old School, a stoic man devoted to duty and religion and the legion." Ray Stevenson played Titus Pullo, a soldier who befriends Vorenus. McKidd said that "they're kind of thrown together by fate, by chance, but somewhere along the line they start to stick ... [They] keep finding themselves accidentally at the epicenter of tumultuous events and immense change, so they're kind of clinging to each other."

Caesar's niece, Atia, was portrayed by actress Polly Walker. According to Heller, while most auditioning actresses assumed that the character was the series' villainess, Walker made "[Atia] bigger than life but completely real ... She could read the phone book with that kind of brio and joy." Rather than a villain, Heller wrote her to be "a real life force. Everything she's doing is for the good of her family, her children. No matter how evil it gets, it's always for a good reason." Walker was pleased with her "very complex character. I found it exciting to play such massive emotions and deal with such interesting, to say the least, situations. I saw it as a huge challenge, and I have huge admiration for this character. A lot of people might consider her to be sort of evil or bad, but I think she's wonderful. She's just a survivor, doing what she's got to do."

=== Filming ===
The series was given a budget of $100 million (£58 million), the largest both HBO and the BBC had ever devoted to a series. The season was filmed between March 2004 and July 2005, at locations in or around Rome, and on a set considered "to be the biggest and most expensive ever built for television." It was built at Cinecittà, where the epic films Ben-Hur (1959) and Cleopatra (1963) had been filmed. Production designer Joseph Bennett built a set that emphasized authenticity and realism rather than grandiosity. He said,

People think of Rome as white and cold and beautiful, powerful but distant. But based on the research, I don't think it was like that at all. If you go to Pompeii, you're struck by how garish it is, even now. The temples and sculptures were all brightly painted. Rome was like Pompeii, but much bigger. And Rome was so noisy it was impossible to sleep. It was like hell. Think of it as a combination of New York and Calcutta, with insane wealth and insane poverty. It was pretty extreme.

The series begins with opening credits that depict traditional Roman myths, such as Romulus and Remus, the city's foundation mythos. For inspiration, visual effects and design company A52 explored museums, read the script and researched Roman history. They created the opening sequence entirely in-house. VFX artist Kirk Balden said of the production, "On many projects, you start off with storyboards, and everyone has a good idea of what it's going to look like when it's completed. This project was very experimental right to the very end. The tone of it is pretty much unlike anything we've done and most of what any of us here have seen. There's a lot there that creatively sets the stage for the series."

Heller was responsible for writing the episode's voice-over, despite his dislike of the task. He said that despite it being his "400th version," he was "still not happy with it." He believed that an early scene in which spoils are distributed from a cart in front of Pompey represented the first real sense of how the series would depict city life. He said, "I think this is the first time that we get a sense of the version of Rome that the show is pushing," which was a very different version than viewers may have been used to. To him, Rome was "colorful and painted" and cosmopolitan. A later scene featuring Cicero the Younger in the Senate proved difficult to film because of a large number of Italian extras who did not speak English. In the DVD audio commentary, he said that "this is one of those scenes where you need really great assistant directors, because all of these Italian extras who have no idea whatsoever what [Cicero's] saying, so to keep them interested and focused and concentrated on what's going on is a real trick."

Extras playing soldiers attended a boot camp under the guidance of a former Royal Marine. Artisans reportedly handmade four thousand costumes using authentic period materials such as cotton, linen, wool, and silk, all of which were hand-dyed on set. Pullo was originally written to be a poor horse rider, a reflection that "Romans were notoriously bad horsemen," according to Heller. However, Stevenson turned out to be "probably the best horseman on the show," so they rewrote this characteristic because bad horsemanship is difficult to fake.

James Madigan, the visual effects supervisor, approached the series as a feature film, observing that "every aspect of the production took meticulous care with every detail, the costumes, the set dressing, the acting, and the attention to historical fact. As you worked on it, you really got the feeling that Rome was going to look like something we had never seen on TV before, so our vfx approach very much wanted to respect that." Madigan attempted to seamlessly mesh the visual effects with the physical sets and depend less on CGI. A friend told Madigan that after seeing the pilot, "he didn’t see any vfx shots, even though there are dozens of shots throughout episode 1. That means we did our job well."

== Marketing ==
HBO said its marketing plan for the series was, "its largest, most aggressive push for a new series". The channel broadcast the first three episodes seven days a week at various times during the day. Non-subscribers could preview the first two episodes during the first week of September 2005. HBO implemented an outdoor marketing campaign in major cities and produced movie-style trailers which preceded a number of films in cinemas. Entertainment Weekly, Vanity Fair, Time, and GQ published full-size articles about the series. The History Channel broadcast five nights of documentaries featuring the Roman Empire, which were hosted by Stevenson, McKidd, and Varma, a collaboration which was the first of its kind between the two networks.

You're trying to show it in a way that [doesn't look like] a history lesson but a fictional story about two guys working for Caesar's army and how history unfolds around them. That it's not just people walking around in nice clean togas.

— Eric Kessler, HBO's president of sales and marketing, on advertising the series as a new perspective of the Roman Empire

David Baldwin, the executive vice president of program planning, said, "This is a huge series for us. We wanted to give it every opportunity to be seen by as many people as possible." Media outlets estimated that the entire marketing campaign cost HBO $10 million, the most the network had spent on marketing a series to that point.

Commentators viewed the success of Rome as crucial for the network, especially after the past mixed reception of Carnivàle and K-Street. In July 2005, James Hibberd of Television Week wrote that Rome was viewed "as the network's best shot for adding another literate, must-see drama to its schedule". Writing for the same publication, Tom Shales said that HBO "has made such a fuss over Rome, and the network itself has put such painful pressure on the show (and its producers) to make a hefty impact, that it'll be scorned like a leper if it fails to make a truly gigantic splash."

== Reception ==
=== Ratings ===
"The Stolen Eagle" was the first broadcast on August 28, 2005, in the United States on HBO and in Canada on The Movie Network and Movie Central. An estimated 3.8 million viewers watched the episode, less than the series premieres of Carnivale and Deadwood but consistent with the series finale of Six Feet Under. In the UK and Ireland, the premiere was broadcast on BBC 2 on November 2, 2005. According to The Independent, more than 6.6 million viewers watched the episode.

=== Critical reception ===
"The Stolen Eagle" received generally mixed reviews from television critics, many of whom criticized its slow pace. Mark A. Perigard of The Boston Herald wrote, "Less perverse than I, Claudius, more entertaining than American Broadcasting Company's (ABC) toga twister Empire, "Rome" gets off to an uneven start." Terry Morrow of the Dayton Daily News criticized the premiere, writing that "the opener, like most pilots, is so bogged down with introducing faces and setting up the story that it turns into a long and tedious journey." Morrow also said the episode suffered from lacking one "standout, signature character", though he believed that the "flaws in Rome should clear up in time, given HBO's knack for winning dramas. It's an epic story, and one worth savoring if you can muddle through the demands of slow storytelling in the beginning."

The Scotsman's Robert McNeil thought that the premiere was "shocking, but also rather slow, as characters are established. Maybe it'll get better. In the meantime, to paraphrase Roger McGough, I came, I saw, I concurred with those who say: Rome wasn't built in an hour." Similarly opinionated was The Cincinnati Post's Rick Bird, who said that like other HBO series, Rome "takes a while to get going. After the first episode you will mostly be confused with a dizzying array of characters, intrigue and subplots. Hang in there. By the second episode things take shape and one should be hooked by episode three with this steamy romp through antiquity and its lusty intrigue." Bird found some positive elements; the episode, he said, was "enhanced by marvelous filmmaking including elaborate sets and costumes. Small-screen film art has rarely painted such a realistic picture of ancient Rome."

Paul English of The Daily Record wrote that "Rome is visually dazzling, full of vim and tantalizingly seductive," adding that "McKidd's growling turn as Ceasar's [sic] footsoldier Lucius Vorenus will undoubtedly propel him into the US major league." Writing for the Los Angeles Daily News, David Kronke failed to find the series very remarkable, writing that "notwithstanding some lurid sex and gruesome violence, [it is] as conventional as anything the network has ever done. Sword-and-sandals epics have become familiar Hollywood staples ... and those expecting something that takes up where the legendarily decadent BBC/PBS series I, Claudius left off may be in for something of a disappointment." Television Without Pity graded the episode with a B.

Some viewers criticized the graphic nudity seen in the pilot, especially in the US. Heller commented, "Romans didn't have our body shame and fear of sexuality. I think that is part of the modern fascination with that world. There was a lack of shame about those things, that we had to portray with a lack of shame in order to make it work."

=== Accolades ===
List of awards and nominations received by "The Stolen Eagle"
Award	Category	Recipients and nominees	Result
Art Directors Guild	Excellence in Production Design for a Single Camera TV Series	Joseph Bennett, Domenico Sica, Carlo Serafini, Dominic Hyman, Daniella Giovannoni	Won
Broadcast Film Critics Association	Best Picture Made for Television	Rome	Nominated
Directors Guild of America	Outstanding Directing – Drama Series	Michael Apted	Won
Emmy Awards	Outstanding Special Visual Effects	Barrie Hemsley, James Madigan, Joe Pavlo, Duncan Kinnaird, Daniel Pettipher, Michele Sciolette, Charles Darby, Clare Herbert, Anna Panton	Won
Visual Effects Society	Best Visual Effects in a Television Series	Barrie Hemsley, James Madigan, Duncan Kinnaird, Joe Pavlo	Won
