= Southcliffe =

- Written by: Tony Grisoni
- Directed by: Sean Durkin
- Country of origin: United Kingdom
- Original language: English
- No. of series: 1
- No. of episodes: 4

Production
- Executive producers: Peter Carlton; Sophie Gardiner
- Producer: Derrin Schlesinger
- Running time: 240 minutes
- Production company: Warp Films

Original release
- Network: Channel 4
- Release: 4 August – 18 August 2013

Southcliffe is a British drama series that aired on Channel 4. Set in a fictional town on the North Kent Marshes, it employs a nonlinear narrative structure to tell the story of a series of shootings by a local man portrayed by Sean Harris, the cause of the shootings and the effects on the town and residents. The series explores tragedy, grief, responsibility and redemption as seen through the eyes of a journalist returning to the small town of his childhood to cover the story.

The series was filmed in Faversham in North Kent and was screened in the Special Presentation section at the 2013 Toronto International Film Festival.

== Cast ==
- Rory Kinnear as David Whitehead
- Sean Harris as Stephen Morton
- Shirley Henderson as Claire Salter
- Anatol Yusef as Paul Gould
- Eddie Marsan as Andrew Salter
- Joe Dempsie as Chris Cooper
- Nichola Burley as Sarah Gould
- Geoff Bell as Alan
- Coral Amiga as Mattie
- Kaya Scodelario as Anna Salter

== Production ==
In August 2012, Channel 4 announced that they had ordered a four-part drama series titled Southcliffe. The drama was written by Tony Grisoni and produced by Warp Films, with Peter Carlton and Sophie Gardiner serving as executive producers, and Sean Durkin as director.

=== Conception ===
The story is of a fictional English market town devastated by a spate of shootings which take place on 2 November 2011. According to its writer Grisoni, "Southcliffe is a fictional market town inhabited by fictional characters, but with similarities to many actual people and places in Britain today; invisible people, anonymous places." He added that "Southcliffe is an anthem to ordinary people's ability to reinvent themselves in the face of ultimate darkness." He denied that Southcliffe's central conceit is exploitative. "It's not really a story of a spree shooting. It's a story of people who are suddenly robbed of someone very close to them." He insisted that it is vitally important not to portray the shooter as a cartoon monster but that he is a human being and should be treated as one.

=== Filming ===
Filming began in October 2012 in Faversham, on an eight-week shooting schedule, and took place at various locations in and around Faversham, including local homes, town centre streets, the Faversham Creek, Hollowshore pub, The Shipwright's Arms, Faversham Recreation Ground, The Market Inn, Oare Marshes, Uplees Cottage, as well as other locations in Kent such as Whitstable, East Kent Railway, Grain Power Station, Teynham Court Farm, Canterbury Hospital, Sittingbourne Police Station, Sittingbourne Community College, and others. Faversham Enterprise Partnership estimated that the filming generated £500,000 for the local economy.

== Reception ==
The critical response to the first two episodes was mostly positive. Benji Wilson of The Daily Telegraph thought that with "its muted palette, protracted silences, dank fogs and seething unease, Southcliffe was anything but nice-cup-of-tea and a sit-down TV, but it was a mesmerising tragedy, nonetheless." Arifa Akbar of The Independent noted "its disturbing silences" and called it "a rare and brilliant Sunday-night viewing", while Paul Whitelaw of The Scotsman considered Southcliffe to be "a major work, and quite easily the best British TV drama of the year so far." The sentiment was shared by Euan Ferguson of The Observer, who called it "the TV event of the year." Sam Wollaston of The Guardian thought that the drama series was a masterly study of a tragedy in smalltown England, one that "felt – and looked, and sounded – so utterly and terribly real", and that it was a "profound, chilling, moving piece of television".

Serena Davies of The Daily Telegraph, however, voiced a contrary opinion and wondered if the level of violence in this show as well as other TV dramas was really necessary.

== Episodes ==
No.	Title	Original release date	UK viewers (millions)
1	"The Hollow Shore"	4 August 2013	2.77
A local handyman, Stephen Morton, meets a young soldier, Chris Cooper, who has returned home from the War in Afghanistan, and invites him to a training mission. Morton presents himself as a former SAS soldier; however, Cooper later discovers this is untrue, and together with his uncle, beats and humiliates Morton. The morning after his humiliation Morton goes on a killing spree, starting with his elderly bedridden mother for whom he was caring.
2	"Light Falls"	5 August 2013	2.27
Stephen Morton goes to Chris Cooper's house and shoots Cooper's girlfriend, but spares Cooper. Pub landlord Paul Gould learns his wife and two young daughters were amongst the victims. The daughter of Claire Salter, a social worker caring for Morton's mother, is also shot dead. The reporter David Whitehead, who grew up in Southcliffe and knew Morton as a child, arrives at the crime scenes after hearing of the major incident in the town. Morton hides in a storm drain in the marshes and is then reported to have killed himself.
3	"Sorrow's Child"	11 August 2013	1.79
David Whitehead finds many of the townspeople reluctant to talk. In a fit of rage, he rants that the town asked for it and deserved the tragedy that befell the community. The families of the victims try to come to terms with their loss. Paul Gould, ridden with guilt and grief at the loss of his family, jumps off a foot bridge.
4	"All Souls"	18 August 2013	1.58
A year later the people affected are still traumatised by the event. David Whitehead returns to Southcliffe to investigate the possibility that Stephen might not have died. He becomes concerned at the mental state of Chris Cooper and stops him from trying to kill himself.

== Awards and nominations ==
The drama series received the most nominations at the 2014 British Academy Television Awards together with The IT Crowd, with four nominations each.

Year	Award	Category	Recipient	Results	Ref.
2014	Broadcasting Press Guild Awards	Best Actor	Rory Kinnear	Nominated	
2014	BAFTA TV Awards	Best Actor	Sean Harris	Won	
2014	BAFTA TV Awards	Best Supporting Actor	Rory Kinnear	Nominated	
2014	BAFTA TV Awards	Best Supporting Actress	Shirley Henderson	Nominated	
2014	BAFTA TV Awards	Best Mini-Series	Southcliffe	Nominated	

== See also ==
- Cumbria shootings
- Dunblane school massacre
- Hungerford massacre
- Monkseaton shootings
