= 2014 British Academy Television Awards =

UK television awards ceremony

60th British Academy Television Awards
- Date: 18 May 2014
- Site: Theatre Royal, Drury Lane
- Hosted by: Graham Norton

Highlights
- Best Comedy Series: A League of Their Own
- Best Drama: Broadchurch
- Best Actor: Sean Harris; Southcliffe
- Best Actress: Olivia Colman; Broadchurch
- Best Comedy Performance: Katherine Parkinson The IT Crowd; Richard Ayoade The IT Crowd
- Most awards: Broadchurch (3)
- Most nominations: Broadchurch/The IT Crowd/Southcliffe (4)

Television coverage
- Channel: BBC One
- Duration: 2 hours 5 minutes
- Ratings: 5.18 million

The 60th British Academy Television Awards nominations were announced on 7 April 2014. The awards ceremony sponsored by Arqiva was held on 18 May 2014 at the Theatre Royal, Drury Lane, London.

== Winners and nominations ==
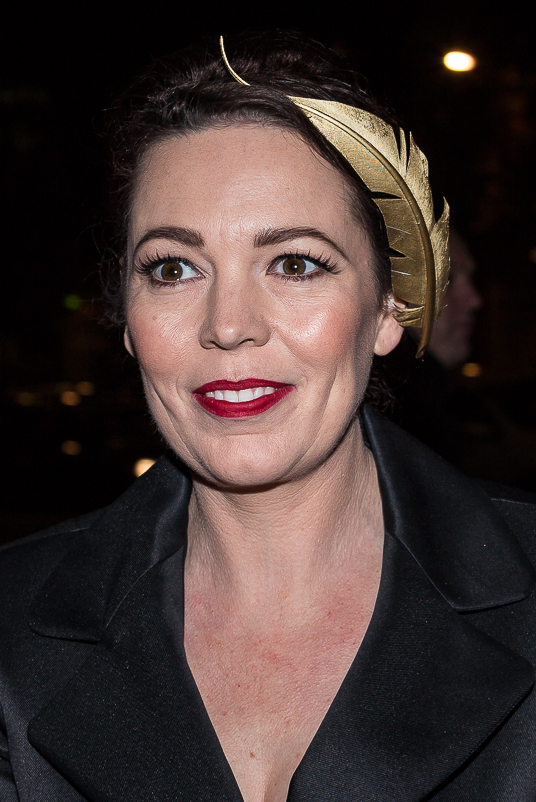
Olivia Colman, Best Actress winner

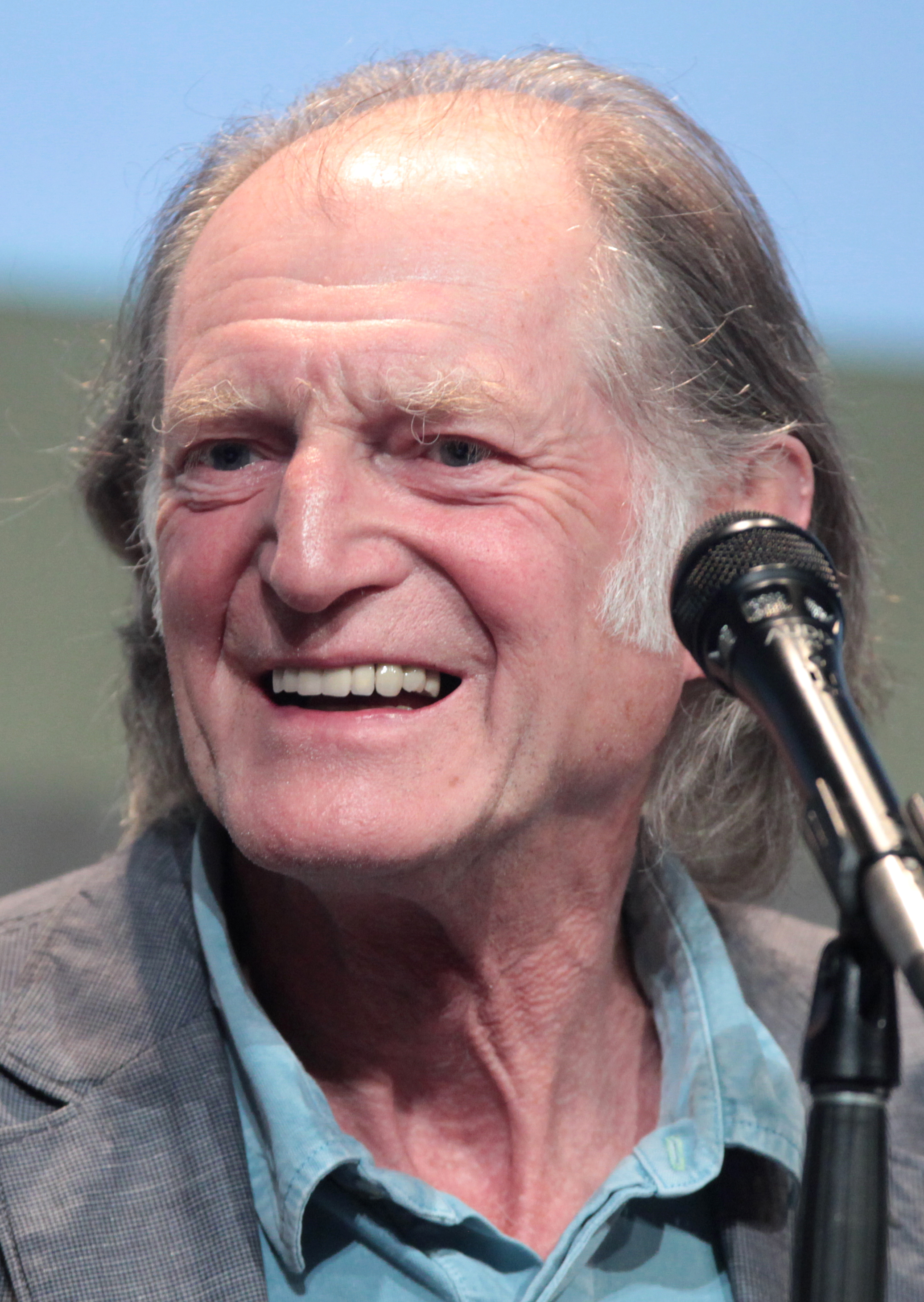
David Bradley, Best Supporting Actor winner

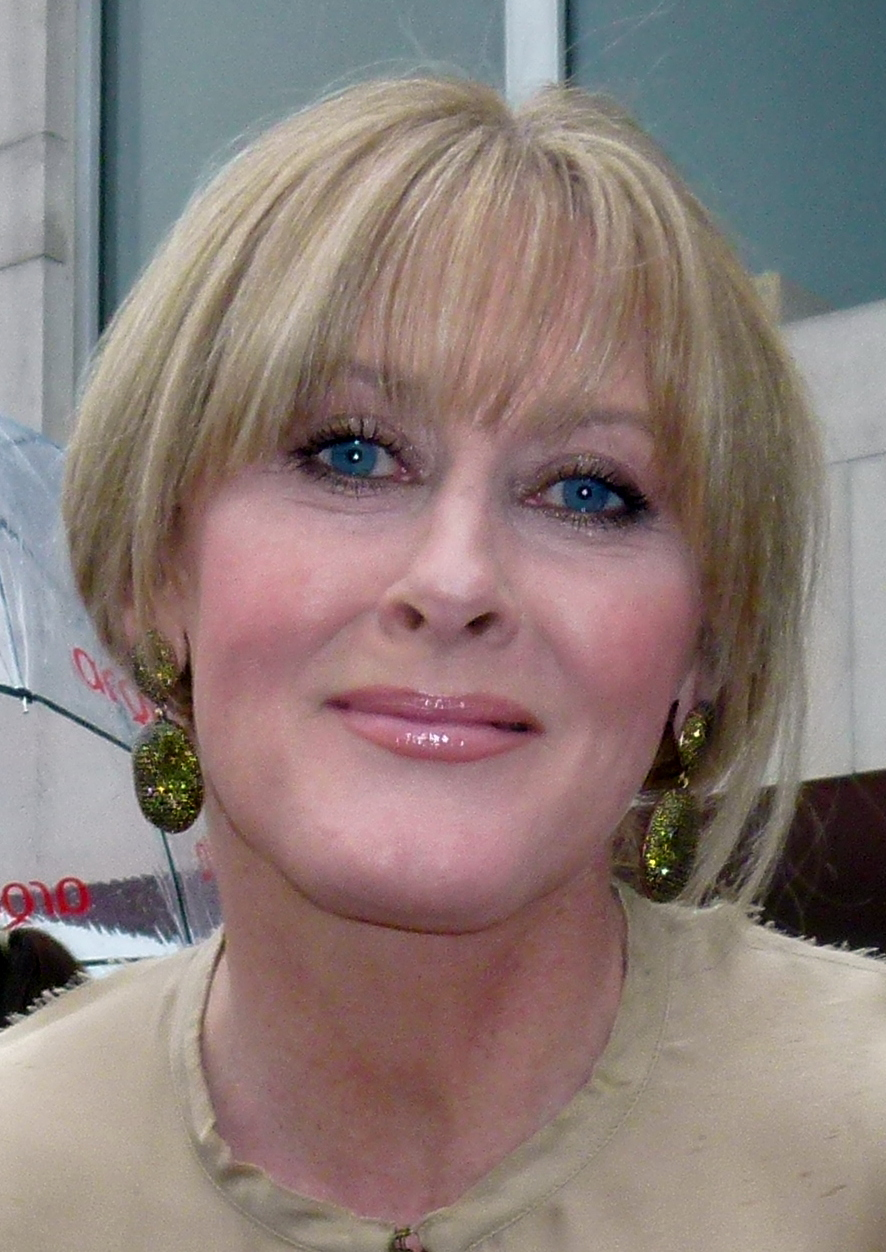
Sarah Lancashire, Best Supporting Actress winner

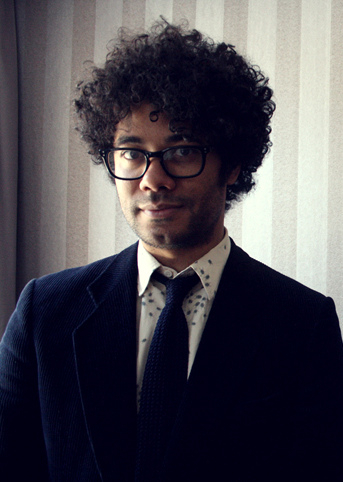
Richard Ayoade, Best Male Comedy Performance winner

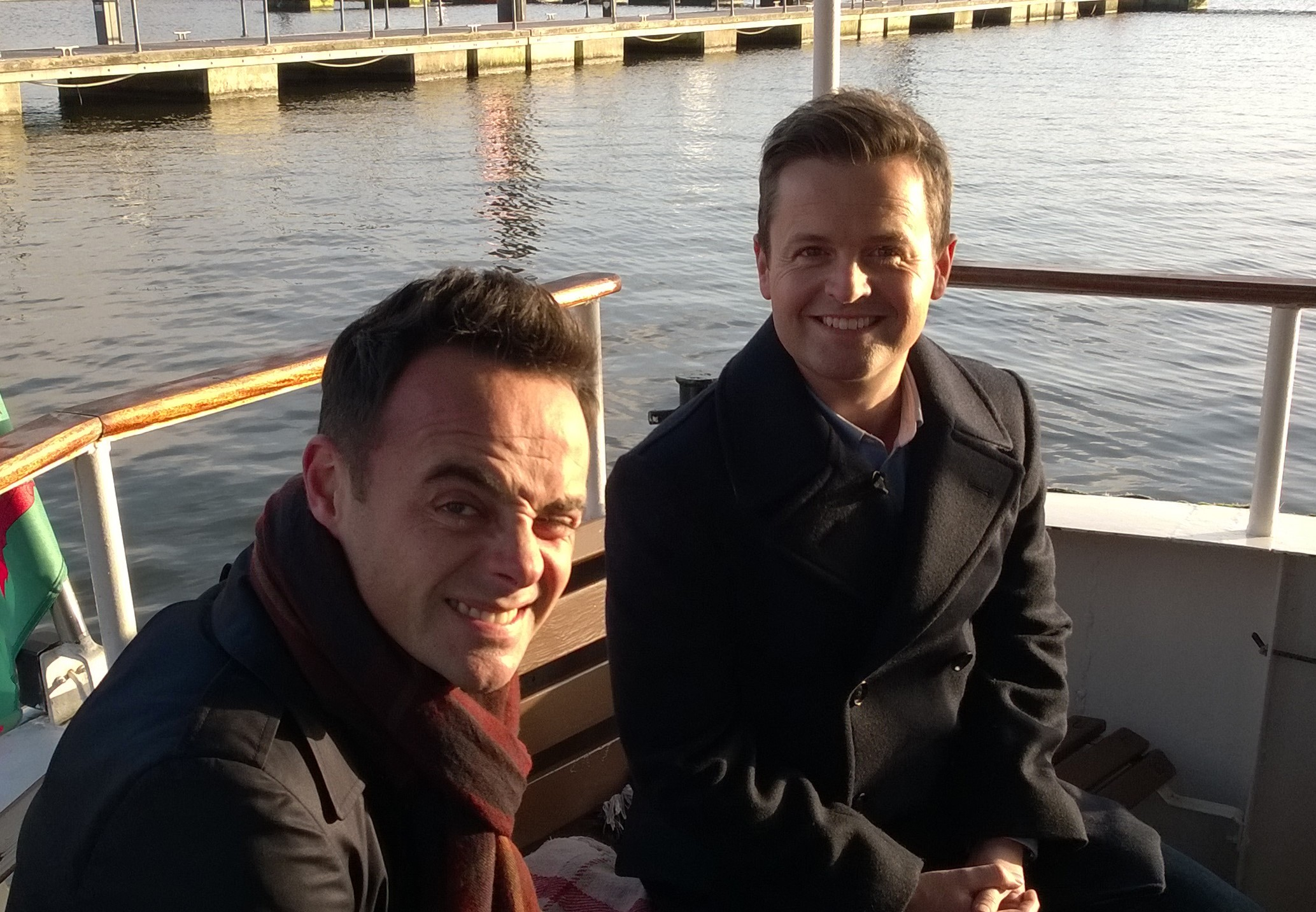
Ant & Dec, Best Entertainment Performance winners

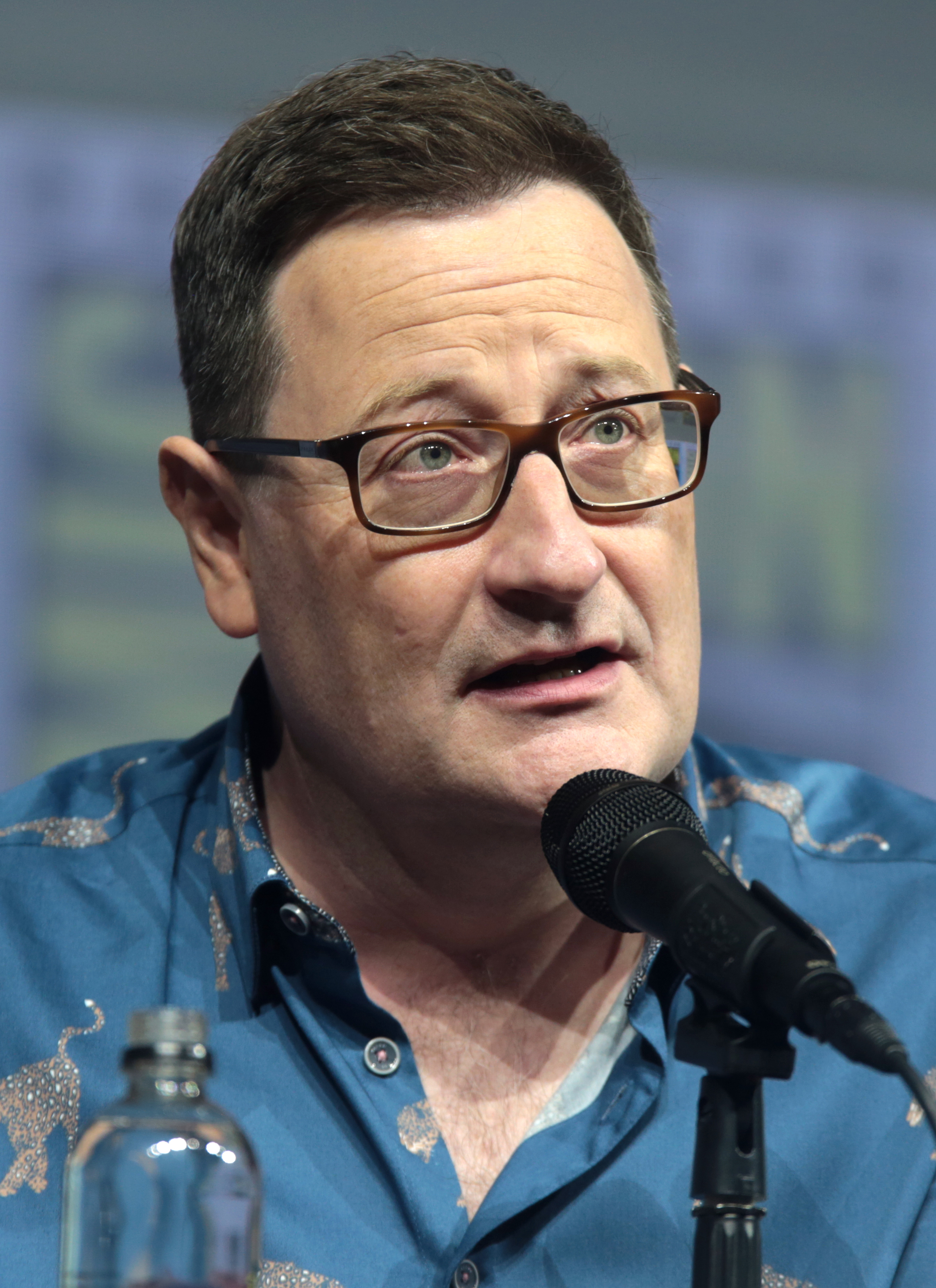
Chris Chibnall, Creator of Best Drama Series winner, Broadchurch

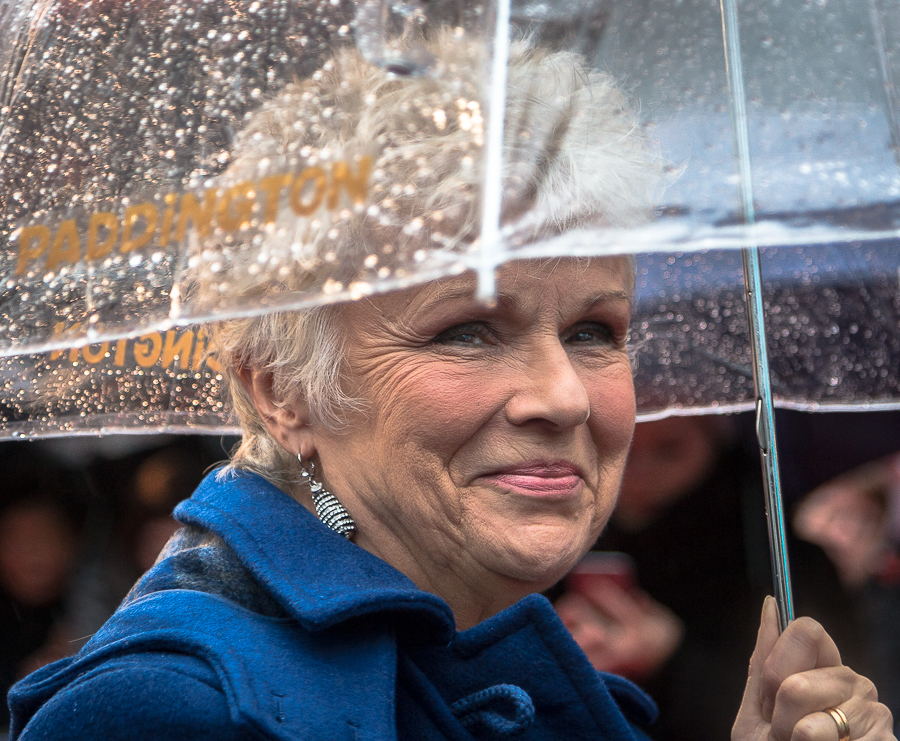
Julie Walters, BAFTA Fellowship Award winner

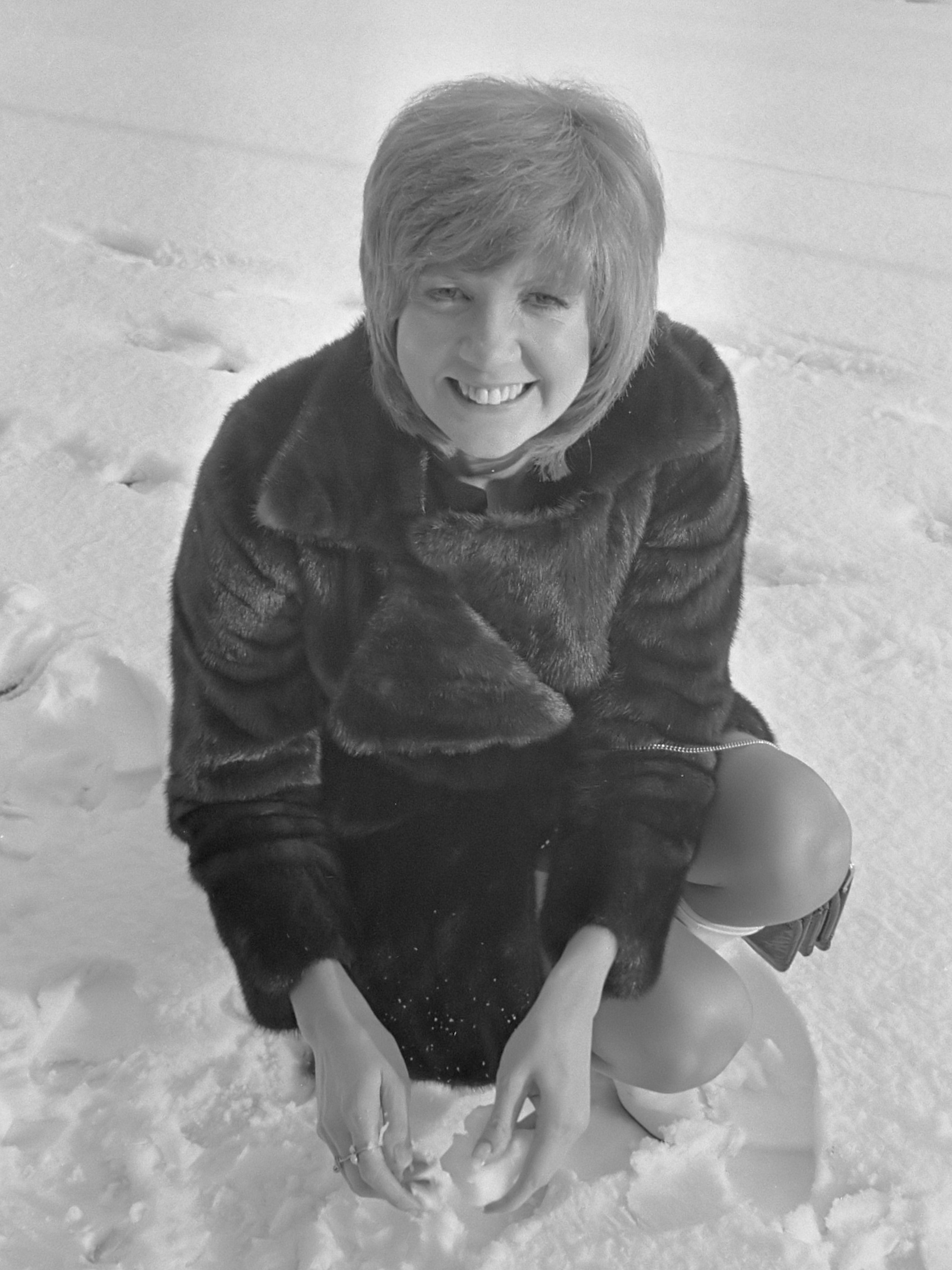
Cilla Black, BAFTA Special Award winner

Winners are listed first and emboldened.

Best Actor	Best Actress
Sean Harris – Southcliffe as Stephen Morton (Channel 4); Jamie Dornan – The Fall as Paul Spector (BBC Two); Luke Newberry – In the Flesh as Kieren Walker (BBC Three); Dominic West – Burton & Taylor as Richard Burton (BBC Four)	Olivia Colman – Broadchurch as DS Ellie Miller (ITV); Helena Bonham Carter – Burton & Taylor as Elizabeth Taylor (BBC Four); Kerrie Hayes – The Mill as Esther Price (Channel 4); Maxine Peake – The Village as Grace Middleton (BBC One)
Best Supporting Actor	Best Supporting Actress
David Bradley – Broadchurch as Jack Marshall (ITV); Jerome Flynn – Ripper Street as Detective Bennet Drake (BBC One); Nico Mirallegro – The Village as Joe Middleton (BBC One); Rory Kinnear – Southcliffe as David Whitehead (Channel 4)	Sarah Lancashire – Last Tango in Halifax as Caroline Dawson (BBC One); Shirley Henderson – Southcliffe as Claire Salter (Channel 4); Claire Rushbrook – My Mad Fat Diary as Linda Earl-Bouchtat (E4); Nicola Walker – Last Tango in Halifax as Gillian Buttershaw (BBC One)
Best Male Comedy Performance	Best Female Comedy Performance
Richard Ayoade – The IT Crowd as Maurice Moss (Channel 4); Mathew Baynton – The Wrong Mans as Sam Pinkett (BBC Two); James Corden – The Wrong Mans as Phil Bourne (BBC Two); Chris O'Dowd – The IT Crowd as Roy Trenneman (Channel 4)	Katherine Parkinson – The IT Crowd as Jen Barber (Channel 4); Frances de la Tour – Vicious as Violet Crosby (ITV); Kerry Howard – Him & Her: The Wedding as Laura Parker (BBC Three); Doon Mackichan – Plebs as Flavia (ITV2)
Best Entertainment Performance	Best Single Drama
Ant & Dec – Ant & Dec's Saturday Night Takeaway (ITV); Charlie Brooker – 10 O'Clock Live (Channel 4); Sarah Millican – The Sarah Millican Television Programme (BBC Two); Graham Norton – The Graham Norton Show (BBC One)	Complicit (Channel 4); An Adventure in Space and Time (BBC Two); Black Mirror : "Be Right Back" (Channel 4); The Wipers Times (BBC Two)
Best Mini-Series	Best Drama Series
In The Flesh (BBC Three); The Fall (BBC Two); The Great Train Robbery (BBC One); Southcliffe (Channel 4)	Broadchurch (ITV); My Mad Fat Diary (E4); Top of the Lake (BBC Two); The Village (BBC One)
Best Soap and Continuing Drama	Best International Programme
Coronation Street (ITV); Casualty (BBC One); EastEnders (BBC One); Holby City (BBC One)	Breaking Bad (AMC/Netflix); Borgen (DR1/BBC Four); House of Cards (Netflix); The Returned (Canal +/Channel 4)
Best Factual Series or Strand	Best Specialist Factual
Bedlam (Channel 4); Educating Yorkshire (Channel 4); Keeping Britain Alive: The NHS in a Day (BBC Two); The Route Masters: Running London's Roads (BBC Two)	David Attenborough's Natural History Museum Alive (Sky 3D); Martin Luther King and the March on Washington (BBC Two); Richard III: The King in the Car Park (Channel 4); The Story of the Jews (BBC Two)
Best Single Documentary	Best Feature
The Murder Trial (Channel 4); 28 Up South Africa (ITV); The Day Kennedy Died (ITV); The Unspeakable Crime: Rape (BBC One)	Long Lost Family (ITV); The Choir: Sing While You Work (BBC Two); Grand Designs (Channel 4); The Great British Bake Off (BBC Two)
Best Reality and Constructed Factual	Best Current Affairs
Gogglebox (Channel 4); The Big Reunion (ITV2); Dragons' Den (BBC Two); The Undateables (Channel 4)	Syria: Across the Lines (Dispatches) (Channel 4); The Cruel Cut (BBC One); The Hunt for Britain's Sex Gangs (Dispatches) (Channel 4); North Korea: Life Inside The Secret State (Dispatches) (Channel 4)
Best News Coverage	Best Sport and Live Events
ITV News at Ten: "Woolwich Attacks" (ITV); Channel 4 News: "Egypt Military Coup" (Channel 4); BBC North West Tonight: "The Dale Cregan Verdict" (BBC One/BBC North West); ITV News Granada Reports: "The Lee Rigby Trial" (ITV/ITV Granada)	The Ashes 2013 – "1st Test, Day 5" (Sky Sports); Bollywood Carmen Live (BBC Three); Glastonbury 2013 (BBC); Wimbledon Men's Final (BBC One/BBC Sport)
Best Entertainment Programme	Best Scripted Comedy
Ant & Dec's Saturday Night Takeaway (ITV); Derren Brown: The Great Art Robbery (Channel 4); Dynamo: Magician Impossible (Watch); Strictly Come Dancing (BBC One)	Him & Her: The Wedding (BBC Three); Count Arthur Strong (BBC Two); The IT Crowd (Channel 4); Toast of London (Channel 4)
Best Comedy and Comedy Entertainment Programme	Radio Times Audience Award
A League of Their Own (Sky One); The Graham Norton Show (BBC One); The Revolution Will Be Televised (BBC Three); Would I Lie to You? (BBC One)	Doctor Who : "The Day of the Doctor" (BBC One); Breaking Bad (AMC/Netflix); Broadchurch (ITV); Educating Yorkshire (Channel 4); Gogglebox (Channel 4); The Great British Bake Off (BBC Two)
BAFTA Fellowship Award	BAFTA Special Award
Julie Walters	Cilla Black

== Programmes with multiple nominations ==
Channel 4 lead the most nominations for any network with 28, 9 ahead of BBC One who had 19. Channel 4's The IT Crowd and Southcliffe as well as ITV's Broadchurch lead the nominations for programming with four nods each.

Programmes that received multiple nominations
Nominations	Programme
4	Broadchurch
4	Southcliffe
4	The IT Crowd
3	Dispatches
3	The Village
2	Ant & Dec's Saturday Night Takeaway
2	Breaking Bad
2	Burton & Taylor
2	Educating Yorkshire
2	The Fall
2	Gogglebox
2	The Graham Norton Show
2	The Great British Bake Off
2	Him & Her: The Wedding
2	In The Flesh
2	Last Tango in Halifax
2	My Mad Fat Diary
2	The Wrong Mans

Networks that received multiple nominations
Nominations	Network
28	Channel 4
19	BBC One
17	BBC Two
13	ITV
6	BBC Three
3	BBC Four
3	Netflix
2	AMC
2	E4
2	ITV2

== Most major wins ==
Shows that received multiple awards
Wins	Show
3	Broadchurch
2	Ant & Dec's Saturday Night Takeaway
2	The IT Crowd

Wins by Network
Wins	Network
8	Channel 4
8	ITV
2	BBC One
2	BBC Three

== In Memoriam ==
- Bob Hoskins
- Eddie Braben
- John Fortune
- David Frost
- Felix Dexter
- Edna Doré
- Kate O'Mara
- Mike Winters
- Addison Cresswell
- Roger Lloyd-Pack
- Richard Thorp
- James Ellis
- Alan Whicker
- Bill Pertwee
- David Jacobs
- Clarissa Dickson Wright
- Paul Shane
- David Coleman
- Lewis Collins
- Bernie Nolan
- John Cole
- Richard Broke
- James Gandolfini
- Jim Goddard
- Cliff Morgan
- Mel Smith

== See also ==
- British Academy Television Awards
- BAFTA Scotland
- BAFTA Cymru
