= Nick Fisher (broadcaster) =

British TV scriptwriter and angler (died 2022)

Nick Fisher (14 August 1959 – c. 17 November 2022) was a British television scriptwriter, journalist and angler. He won a BAFTA Award in 2006 for his work on The Giblet Boys which was voted Best Drama in the BAFTA Children's Awards, and was nominated as Best Writer for the same programme.

Fisher appeared on TV with Hugh Fearnley-Whittingstall, featuring his hobby as an angler. Together with Fearnley-Whittingstall, he won the André Simon Memorial book award in 2007 for The River Cottage Fish Book. He also appeared with Fearnley-Whittingstall on River Cottage: Gone Fishing.

Fisher, who lived in Hooke, near Bridport, Dorset, went missing in November 2022. His body was discovered two days later on 17 November. Fisher was found at the Wessex Royale Hotel in Dorchester. Dorset Police apologised to his family who criticised their investigation.
