= The Giblet Boys =

- The Giblet Boys Title Card
- Genre: Children's; Slapstick; Comedy
- Created by: Nick Fisher
- Directed by: Charles Martin; David Skynner
- Starring: Jack Bannon; Scott Chisholm; Michael Kosminsky; Rupert Holliday-Evans; Anna Mountford; Charlie Mudie
- Composer: White Label UK
- Country of origin: United Kingdom
- Original language: English
- No. of series: 2
- No. of episodes: 13

Production
- Producers: Davina Belling; Clive Parsons
- Editor: Iain Erskine
- Running time: 22 minutes

Original release
- Network: ITV (CITV)
- Release: 7 January – 1 December 2005

The Giblet Boys is a British comedy about three brothers, Pud, Kevin and Scurvy, and their adventures usually involving their devious Mum. The show was broadcast between 7 January 2005 and 1 December 2005.

Even though it only ran for two series, the show was still repeated frequently on the CITV channel between 2006 and March 2015.

Written by Nick Fisher, the series received a BAFTA in 2006.

== Cast ==
- Scurvy – Jack Bannon
- Kevin – Michael Kosminsky
- Pud – Scott Chisholm
- Mum – Anna Mountford
- Dad – Rupert Holliday-Evans
- Miss. Cabin – Charlie Mudie
- Jeweller – Barnaby Edwards
- Mr Saunders – Ross O'Hennessy
