= List of Rome (TV series) episodes =

First and second season DVD cover art.

Rome, a dramatic television series created by John Milius, William J. MacDonald and Bruno Heller, premiered on 28 August 2005 on the HBO Network in the United States and ended on 25 March 2007, after 2 seasons and a total of 22 episodes.

Rome is a historical drama depicting the period of history surrounding the violent transformation of the Roman Republic into the Roman Empire; a change driven by civil warfare between radical populares and conservative optimates, the decay of political institutions, and the actions of ambitious men and women.

The first and second seasons of Rome were released on DVD in the U.S. in 2006 and 2007, respectively; and Blu-ray versions were released in 2011. A complete series box set with additional features was released in 2009, on both DVD and Blu-ray.

== Series overview ==
Series	Episodes	Originally released	
Series	Episodes	First released	Last released
1	12	28 August 2005	20 November 2005
2	10	14 January 2007	25 March 2007

== Episodes ==
=== Season 1 (2005) ===
No. overall	No. in season	Title	Directed by	Written by	Original release date	US viewers (millions)
1	1	"The Stolen Eagle"	Michael Apted	Bruno Heller	28 August 2005	3.81
As the wars in Gaul finally come to an end, Caesar is faced with both triumph and tribulation. On the heels of his victory comes news of his daughter's death. Rewarded with the adulation of the people, he also garners the enmity of powerful opponents and former friends. In Rome, Pompey the Great must balance honor and politics as he is urged to betray an ancient rival and recent friend. Atia of the Julii tries to steer her family on the dangerous path between the growing divisions of power, and in the Gallic countryside, two unlikely allies must reclaim that which Caesar has lost.
2	2	"How Titus Pullo Brought Down the Republic"	Michael Apted	Bruno Heller	4 September 2005	3.03
With growing political tensions at home, Caesar needs a voice within the Senate, and Mark Antony is not above accepting the gift of a bought office. Escorting the new "Tribune of the People" to Rome, Vorenus and Pullo return to their homes for the first time in years: Vorenus to his family, and Pullo to his vices. Atia rewards those who return her lost son to her. In the back rooms of Rome, powerful men strike bargains to strip Caesar of his growing power, and in growing political tensions of Rome the actions of the basest of men will shake the foundations of the city.
3	3	"An Owl in a Thornbush"	Michael Apted	Bruno Heller	11 September 2005	2.58
Caesar, at the head of his still advancing army, sends Vorenus and Pullo, along with the Ubian cavalry for reinforcement, on a mission to scout out Pompey's defenses, with the strict mandate to advance only until resistance is met and, if civilians are met along the way, to give Caesar's proclamation to them, and to instruct them to return to Rome and have it read in the forum. Marc Antony tells Vorenus that if no resistance is met and they encounter no civilians, he is to take the proclamation and nail it to the door of the Senate house. Caesar is curious as to why Vorenus is so morose and Antony reveals that Vorenus is a strict Catonian who believes what Caesar is doing is a "terrible sacrilege." Caesar responds that he is only seeking his legitimate right.
4	4	"Stealing from Saturn"	Julian Farino	Bruno Heller	18 September 2005	2.53
In the opening scene, a man strung upside down from a tree is being flayed. Pompey, Brutus, Cicero, Cato, and Scipio discuss the current situation: Caesar has marched on Rome and taken control of the city without meeting with any resistance, and the Senate and the legions loyal to Pompey have withdrawn to the south. Pompey's son Quintus enters the tent in which they are meeting, bearing bad news: the man whom Quintus has been having tortured has told them that, after killing Pompey's man Durio and attempting to steal the gold taken from the treasury in the Temple Of Saturn, the entire party had run into Caesar's scouts, including Lucius Vorenus and Titus Pullo, and had been either killed or forced to flee. Quintus is convinced that the scouts have taken the gold and Pompey sends him to Rome to find out more.
5	5	"The Ram has Touched the Wall"	Allen Coulter	Bruno Heller	25 September 2005	2.29
Pompey must stall for time, and his supporters urge him to make peace with Caesar. Caesar and Antony must balance what is expedient with how their actions will appear to the people. Atia's jealousy of Servilia leads to actions that spell humiliation for Caesar and despair for Servilia. A sudden reversal of fortune forces Vorenus to choose whether it is to the legions or the underworld of Rome that he will sell his integrity. Servilia's rage turns her onto a dark path of revenge. Niobe faces the possibility of having to lose her son and have her secret fall into the hands of those who do not know what to do with it. Pullo is retained to educate Octavian, but it is questionable as to who will teach and who will learn.
6	6	"Egeria"	Alan Poul	John Milius and Bruno Heller	2 October 2005	2.06
With Caesar leading his legions against Pompey, Mark Antony is left to govern Rome, much to the alarm of the patricians who must bear the brunt of Antony's new policies. Evander's disappearance causes even more divisions within Vorenus' family. Octavian's education takes a new twist as he faces a rite of passage. With news of disaster in Caesar's campaigns, Atia attempts to hedge her family's future by attempting to scheme with Antony against Caesar, with disastrous results, and begins to wonder if reconciliation with Servilia might not be wise. An ambassador brings Antony offers from Pompey, and he must choose whether to trust to Caesar's fate, or betray a friend. Vorenus and Niobe find intimacy together in the brief time before Antony's legions sail for Greece, and Pullo discovers that blasphemy has its consequences. Octavian is sent away to school because Atia feels that Rome is not safe for men of the Julii.
7	7	"Pharsalus"	Tim Van Patten	David Frankel	9 October 2005	2.43
Caesar is desperate for troops after the tragedy in the Adriatic. Pompey's supporters resist his more cautious plans and press for glorious victory at Pharsulus. Niobe fears that Vorenus is lost and finds comfort with her estranged sister. Atia fears that Caesar's war and her influence are lost, and turns for help in an unlikely quarter. Octavia finds a hint of welcome but unsettling affection. Brutus and Cicero find hearty and unexpected forgiveness. Pullo and Vorenus find a grisly means of escape from their predicament, and are presented with an amazing opportunity and a difficult choice. Pompey discovers that a man's fate can only be avoided for so long.
8	8	"Caesarion"	Steve Shill	William J. MacDonald	16 October 2005	2.46
Having pursued Pompey into Egypt, Caesar arrives in Alexandria and meets the boy king Ptolemy XIII, who offers the general a surprise gift. Vorenus and Pullo play liberators again, freeing Ptolemy's incarcerated sister Cleopatra. Caesar seeks payment from Egypt for past debts and ends up forging a strategic union to ensure his legacy.
9	9	"Utica"	Jeremy Podeswa	Alexandra Cunningham	30 October 2005	2.75
With Scipio and Cato defeated, Caesar returns home to a hero's welcome. Vorenus' and Pullo's showdown with a local thug, Erastes, leads to an unexpected reprieve from Caesar. Servilia's plan to use Octavia to unearth a secret about Caesar backfires. Octavian returns from his schooling, Timon mentions that it has been two years that he has been away.
10	10	"Triumph"	Alan Taylor	Adrian Hodges	6 November 2005	2.23
Unanimously proclaimed Dictator by the Senate, Caesar pronounces the civil war over and proclaims a "triumph," five days of military pomp, feasting, and games honoring his victories. No longer an enlisted soldier, Pullo eyes a pastoral future with Eirene. Vorenus runs for municipal magistrate, with Posca's help. Octavian retrieves Octavia from her self-imposed exile. Servilia invites a vengeful Quintus, son of Pompey, into her home, to Brutus' dismay.
11	11	"The Spoils"	Mikael Salomon	Bruno Heller	13 November 2005	2.21
While Pullo descends into Erastes' netherworld, Vorenus negotiates a severance for veteran soldiers. Caesar invites him and Niobe to one of Atia's parties. Cassius attempts to convince Brutus that the life of the Republic is indeed "in your hands."
12	12	"Kalends of February"	Alan Taylor	Bruno Heller	20 November 2005	2.59
As a result of their exploits in the arena, Pullo and Vorenus have become heroes in Rome, causing Caesar to reward Vorenus. Pullo's unexpected return to Vorenus' household prompts a murder attempt by his former slave Eirene. Caesar overhauls the Senate by adding Vorenus and some former foes, to the chagrin of the old guard. Not wanting Vorenus to be killed and become a martyr, Servilia has him informed of Niobe's adultery, causing him to leave Ceaser and return home. While Caesar is murdered in the Senate, Servilia tells Atia that she intends to seek revenge against her. Upon confronting her, Vorenus sees Niobe plunge to her death.

=== Season 2 (2007) ===
No. overall	No. in season	Title	Directed by	Written by	Original release date	US viewers (millions)
13	1	"Passover"	Tim Van Patten	Bruno Heller	14 January 2007	1.50
Caesar has been murdered, Mark Antony emerges from the Senate in shock, only to face Quintus Pompey and his thugs, who immediately follow him to try to kill him. Brutus returns home shaking after the murder. His mother is already plotting the return of the Roman Republic. Titus Pullo asks Eirene to marry him and she accepts. Erastes Fulmen kidnaps Lucius Vorenus' children and sister-in-law, after the latter had cursed them for hiding Niobe's infidelity. Mark Antony proposes an amnesty to the rest of the senate to keep the peace and allow the Republic to continue. Vorenus says goodbye to Niobe while Rome says goodbye to Caesar. Vorenus and Pullo track down Fulmen to a bath house, where he tells them he killed Vorenus' family.
14	2	"Son of Hades"	Allen Coulter	Bruno Heller	21 January 2007	2.10
Mark Antony is ruling Rome, but Octavian is demanding his inheritance. In the meantime Cleopatra comes to Rome and asks for her son Caesarion to be recognized as Caesar's son. Lucius Vorenus is full of misery, having lost both his wife and his children, and also blames himself for the death of Julius Caesar. Titus Pullo asks Mark Antony to help. After admonishing him over Ceaser's death, Mark Antony sets Vorenus the task of ending the gang wars that have broken out in the Aventine after the death of Erastes Fulmen. He uses the goddess Concordia to persuade the gang bosses to meet: they have a superstitious regard for the goddess. When his reasonable offers are rejected by some of them, he commits sacrilege, breaking the image and declaring himself 'Son of Hades'. Pullo is alarmed by this. Vorenus thinks that the gods can do nothing more to him, so he has nothing to fear.
15	3	"These Being the Words of Marcus Tullius Cicero"	Alan Poul	Scott Buck	28 January 2007	N/A
As the nomadic Brutus and Cassius struggle to raise foreign money for an army, Mark Antony sets his sights on Gaul. Cicero delivers an in-absentia message to the Senate, and then throws his support to Octavian, the new Caesar. Meanwhile, Vorenus is in a battle of his own, having provoked an all-out gang war in the Aventine Collegium. At Atia's villa, Octavia passes the hours getting intoxicated by hemp with a nouveau riche tradesman's daughter, while Duro (Rafi Gavron), a duplicitous youth, looks for a chance to set Servilia's deadly plan in motion.
16	4	"Testudo et Lepus (The Tortoise and the Hare)"	Adam Davidson	Todd Ellis Kessler	4 February 2007	N/A
43 BC. Servilia dispatches a spy named Duro to Atia's villa. Duro slips into Atia's kitchen, where he flirts with the cook, then secretly pours poison into the goose stew the cook was making for Atia's dinner. The cook tastes the stew and dies before Atia can touch it. Atia has Timon torture Duro until Duro confesses that he was working for Servilia. Atia then has her men capture Servilia, gang-rape her, and torture her. Octavian badly defeats Mark Antony in battle and begins calling himself Caesar. Octavian sends Agrippa to Rome to announce Octavian's victory to Octavia. Pullo informs Vorenus that his children are alive and in slavery, and they both set out to free them.
17	5	"Heroes of the Republic"	Alik Sakharov	Mere Smith	11 February 2007	N/A
The struggle in Rome continues as Octavian, the new Caesar, with his army at the city's borders, establishes himself as consul to the senate with the help of Cicero. Meanwhile, Vorenus returns to Rome with his rescued children. Secretly, the children hate Vorenus, blaming him for their mother's death (unaware she committed suicide) and for cursing them. The children steal some of Vorenus' money and run off to their aunt Lyde, who insists that they return to their father and, at least, pretend to love and forgive him even after what he has done to them. Vorenus makes peace with his rival gangs at a great loss, but informs Pullo that even though the others may think they are "going soft", they will rebuild their forces. At an orgy, Agrippa abducts Octavia and returns her home to Atia. After Atia fumes at Octavia for going to an orgy, Agrippa confesses his love for Octavia, who is stunned as he walks out.
18	6	"Philippi"	Roger Young	Eoghan Mahony	18 February 2007	N/A
The episode begins with Brutus and Cassius on their march through Greece with their army of 100,000 soldiers to challenge Octavian. Cassius is worried about the grain supply for their army, whereas Brutus is cheerful and talking about saving the Republic. In Cisalpine Gaul, Marc Antony, Lepidus, and Octavian are devising a plan to surprise Brutus and Cassius. They believe their enemies do not know that they are reunited and hope to overcome Brutus and Cassius with an unexpectedly large army. Octavian comes up with a list of supporters of Brutus in Rome and proposes to send the list to Lucius Vorenus and order him to have them killed. Pullo is assigned to kill Cicero. Lepidus objects to the killing of some of the most honorable men in Rome but is persuaded by the prospect of the money the killing would bring to them. They resolve to march to Greece and leave Lepidus in Rome.
19	7	"Death Mask"	John Maybury	Scott Buck	4 March 2007	N/A
Servilia mourns the death of Brutus, killed at Phillippi. She kneels in front of Atia's door chanting repeatedly for justice. Although Atia ignores her initially, the incessant chanting attracts a crowd of pleb onlookers and annoys Atia. After two days, Atia gets fed up with Servilia's obstinacy and throws open the door to let Servilia vent her anger and leave. However, Servilia calls upon the gods to curse Atia for the rest of her life, and then commits suicide, leaving Atia in shock. Vorena, Vorenus's eldest daughter, is seduced by a member of a rival gang led by Memmio and becomes an informant for them. Meanwhile Marc Antony, Octavian and Lepidus divide the empire to be ruled by them. Octavian arranges for Antony to marry Octavia, much to the dismay of Atia and Agrippa. Timon, having regained his faith and commitment to his people, plans with his Zealot brother Levi to assassinate the visiting prince Herod. After seeing Atia nearby and remembering his family, however, Timon decides against the attack at the last minute, believing that killing Herod would be futile. Levi refuses and tries to kill Herod himself, only for Timon to reluctantly kill his brother.
20	8	"A Necessary Fiction"	Carl Franklin	Todd Ellis Kessler	11 March 2007	N/A
Prince Herod has shipped in a secret consignment of gold for the Triumvirate, and Octavian instructs Vorenus to oversee its safe passage discreetly into Rome. Vorenus delegates the task to Pullo, who is known and trusted by both Octavian and Mark Antony, much to the ire of Vorenus' third man, Mascius. However, Gaia poisons Eirene's tea, causing Eirene to die in childbirth with a stillborn baby boy. Pullo is incapacitated with grief, so Mascius takes over the operation. An ambush results in the theft of the gold and the near death of Mascius. As accusations fly, Maecenas is convinced that Antony and Posca are the culprits. He had earlier plotted with Posca to steal a portion of the gold for themselves, but now believes that he has been double-crossed. He exacts his revenge by revealing to Octavian that sexual relationships still exist between Antony and Atia and between Octavia and Agrippa. Octavian has his mother and sister put under house arrest, and banishes Anthony to Egypt. Meanwhile, Vorenus deduces that Vorena was the one who gave away the shipment's location. She admits her betrayel and that she still hates him for Niobe's death (not believing Vorenus when he tells her she took her own life) and a fight breaks out between them. Timon and his family leave Rome and head to Jerusalem. Marc Antony leaves for Egypt, and a disillusioned Lucius Vorenus joins him.
21	9	"Deus Impeditio Esuritori Nullus (No God Can Stop a Hungry Man)"	Steve Shill	Mere Smith	18 March 2007	N/A
Rome is facing a dire shortage of grain, forcing Octavian to barter with Mark Antony to get new shipments sent from Egypt. Mark Antony and Cleopatra continually increase their demands in exchange for grain, eventually driving away Octavian's negotiator. In so doing, Antony hopes to push Octavian into declaring war, which Antony believes he can win due to his support among the Roman people. As a last resort, Octavian sends Atia and Octavia to Alexandria, knowing that Antony will reject his lover and lawful wife respectively. Octavian is proven correct: Antony refuses to see Atia and Octavia and sends them back to Rome. Posca secretly leaves Antony's service and defects to Octavian. Lucius Vorenus, who has been telling Caesarion about Caesarion's father, chooses to stay in Alexandria with Antony.
22	10	"De Patre Vostro (About Your Father)"	John Maybury	Bruno Heller	25 March 2007	2.40
After losing the Battle of Actium, a vanquished Mark Antony barricades himself with Cleopatra in their palace in Alexandria. The palace becomes a place of never-ending orgies as Mark Antony drugs and drinks himself into stupor. Octavian sends an emissary to Mark Antony, with a secret message to Lucius Vorenus to avoid a direct assault on the palace, which might lead to a popular uprising. Mark Antony refuses Octavian's demand of unconditional surrender and challenges Octavian to single combat. Vorenus also refuses to betray Mark Antony by opening the palace gates. Meanwhile, Octavian sends an emissary to Cleopatra, promising to spare her and her kingdom from destruction in exchange for Antony, dead or alive. The next morning, the servant Charmian tells Antony that Cleopatra is dead, leading him to commit suicide with Vorenus's assistance. Cleopatra later commits suicide after realizing that she cannot seduce or negotiate with Octavian. Vorenus escapes with Caesarion, whom Octavian will kill to ensure his position as Caesar's heir. They meet up with Pullo, but Vorenus is wounded while battling with Octavian's soldiers at a checkpoint. They return to Rome, where Vorenus reconciles with his family on his deathbed. After Octavian's triumph (at which Atia warns Octavian's new wife Livia to not challenge her), Pullo convinces Octavian that Caesarion is dead and afterward begins to tell Caesarion (now renamed as Aeneas) about his father's true identity.
