= Summer in the Suburbs =

- Genre: Crime drama
- Created by: Tony Basgallop
- Directed by: David Attwood
- Starring: Aneirin Hughes; Tessa Peake-Jones; Fred Pearson; Sid Mitchell; Ann Mitchell; Sarah Alexander; Michael Bertenshaw; Ryan Davenport; Jemima Rooper; Patrick Cremin
- Theme music composer: John Harle; Sarah Jane Morris
- Composer: John Harle
- Country of origin: United Kingdom
- Original language: English

Production
- Executive producer: David M. Thompson
- Producer: Hilary Salmon
- Cinematography: David Higgs
- Running time: 90 minutes
- Production company: BBC

Original release
- Network: BBC Two
- Release: 10 January 2000

Summer in the Suburbs is a single television crime drama, written and devised by Tony Basgallop, that was broadcast on BBC Two on 10 January 2000. Described as an "intense murder drama", Summer in the Suburbs follows the story of a 14-year-old girl whose lifeless body is found in a field, and the lead detective, Ted Lyle (Aneirin Hughes), who investigates her death. As he and his wife Sandra are among local parents caught up in a wave of fear and suspicion, Ted's investigations uncover a shocking suspect. The programme was commissioned in August 1999 by then controller of BBC Two, Jane Root, and was directed by David Attwood and produced by Hilary Salmon.

== Cast ==
- Aneirin Hughes as DC Ted Lyle
- Tessa Peake-Jones as Sandra Lyle
- Fred Pearson as Harold Lyle
- Sid Mitchell as James Lyle
- Ann Mitchell as Mulligan
- Sarah Alexander as Maisie
- Michael Bertenshaw as George Saunders
- Ryan Davenport as John Lyle
- Jemima Rooper as Julie Lyle
- Patrick Cremin as DS Greg Lipton
- Emily Corrie as Theresa Gibbs
- Joanne Leigh-Palmer as Leanne
- Elaine Donnelly as Helen Gibbs
- Neil Conrich as DCI Lawson
- Chad Gomez as Adam Keys
- Craig Vye as Guy
- Michael Tucek as Robbo
- Charles Simon as Terry
- Marcus Rogers as Bobby
