= Lia Williams =

British actress and director (born 1964)

- Born: 26 November 1964 (age 61); Birkenhead, Cheshire, England
- Education: London Studio Centre
- Occupations: Actress; director
- Years active: 1984–present
- Partner: Angus Wright (2015–present)
- Children: Joshua James
- Awards: Full List

Lia Williams (born 26 November 1964) is an English actress and director, on stage, in film, and on television. She has had television roles in The Crown (playing Wallis Simpson), in May 33rd (2004) for which she was nominated for a BAFTA, and in The Missing (2016), Kiri (2016), His Dark Materials (2019–2022) and The Capture (2019–2026).

Williams is a three-time Laurence Olivier Award nominee, for her work in The Revengers' Comedies (1992), Skylight (1997), and Oresteia (2015).

== Early life ==
Williams was born in Birkenhead. She graduated from the London Studio Centre. Her first job in 1984 was understudying in the play Daisy Pulls It Off in the West End. She then took over a main role, and was talent-spotted by Alan Ayckbourn.

== Career ==
=== Theatre ===
Williams's breakthrough performance came in 1991 when she appeared in The Revengers' Comedies, for which she won the Critics' Circle Theatre Award for Most Promising Newcomer, and was nominated for the Laurence Olivier Award for Best Comedy Performance in 1992.

In 1992, she played the role of Carol in the original production of David Mamet's Oleanna, at the Theatre Royal, Bath, transferring to the Royal Court Theatre in 1993.

In 1995, Williams appeared opposite Michael Gambon in David Hare's Skylight at the National Theatre. She received a nomination for the 1996 Laurence Olivier Award for Best Actress. Williams reprised her role in the 1997 Broadway production, and was nominated for the Tony Award for Best Actress.

In 2001, Williams appeared again in the West End and on Broadway, playing Ruth in Harold Pinter's The Homecoming. Her long-standing collaboration with Harold Pinter included roles in The Collection, Celebration, The Room, The Lover, The Hothouse and Old Times.

Other leading theatre performances include Rosalind in As You Like It for the RSC, Alan Ayckbourn's Absurd Person Singular, Henryk Ibsen's The Lady from the Sea, and Pinter's Old Times, in which she alternated the roles of Anna and Kate with Kristin Scott Thomas.

As Clytemnestra in Robert Icke's Oresteia Williams was nominated for both Olivier and Evening Standard Awards. Also for Robert Icke, she alternated the roles of Elizabeth I and Mary, Queen of Scots with Juliet Stevenson in Mary Stuart.

In Dublin, Williams appeared at the Gate Theatre as Alma in The Eccentricities of a Nightingale (2003) and Blanche DuBois in Tennessee Williams' A Streetcar Named Desire (2013). Both roles earned her the Irish Theatre Award for Best Actress.

In 2018, Williams was nominated for the Evening Standard Theatre Award for Best Actress for her performance as Jean Brodie in David Harrower’s adaptation of The Prime of Miss Jean Brodie at the Donmar Warehouse.

In 2019, she played the role of Hannah Jelkes in the West End theatre production of Tennessee Williams' The Night of the Iguana at the Noël Coward Theatre opposite Clive Owen.

=== Film and television ===
In 1993, Williams made her film debut in Michael Winner's Dirty Weekend. Winner chose her after seeing her in an Alan Ayckbourn play. Subsequent film appearances have included supporting roles in Firelight (1997), Shot Through the Heart (1998), The King Is Alive (2000), Girl from Rio (2001), and The Christmas Miracle of Jonathan Toomey (2007).

Williams played the title role in the miniseries The Russian Bride (2001), for ITV, opposite Sheila Hancock and Douglas Hodge. Her performance earned her the 2002 Golden FIPA Award for Best Actress at the Biarritz International Festival of Audiovisual Programming.

Williams played the lead role in May 33rd (2004) for the BBC, and was nominated for a British Academy Television Award for Best Actress.

In 2009, Williams had a main role in the fourth series of the ITV comedy drama series Doc Martin with Martin Clunes.

She played Wallis, Duchess of Windsor in the Netflix series The Crown, Nadia Herz in the second series of The Missing (2016), and starred in Kiri, a Channel 4 series, alongside Sarah Lancashire and Steven Mackintosh.

Williams appears as a series regular in the BBC mystery thriller The Capture (2019-2026) and the Sky Atlantic spy thriller The Day of the Jackal (2024–present).

=== Director ===
Williams has been directing short films since 2002, her debut being Feathers (2002), which was based on a short story by Raymond Carver. In 2008, her short film The Stronger (2007), which won Best Short Film at Raindance, and was nominated for the Best Short Film at the BAFTA Film Awards.

In 2009, Williams directed Dog Alone, a dialogue-free short film which was broadcast as part of British Sky Broadcasting's series 10 Minute Tales. In 2016 she directed Nanabozhung, a feature-length documentary about the Batchewana First Nations, Canada.

On stage, she has also directed The Matchbox, by Frank McGuinness for Liverpool Playhouse and the Tricycle Theatre and Ashes to Ashes as part of the Harold Pinter Season in the West End (2019). In 2021, Williams directed an acclaimed production of Doubt by John Patrick Shanley at Chichester Festival Theatre, West Sussex.

== Personal life ==
Williams is married to the actor Angus Wright; they first met after starring together in a production of the Oresteia at the Almeida Theatre. Her son, Joshua James, is also an actor. In 2023, they worked together in The Vortex at Chichester Festival Theatre, in which they played mother and son.

== Filmography ==
=== Film ===
Year	Title	Role	Notes
1993	Dirty Weekend	Bella	
1996	Different for Girls	Defence Solicitor	
1996	This Is Not America	Mrs. Callan	Short film
1997	Firelight	Constance	
1997	The Fifth Province	Diana de Brie	
2000	The King is Alive	Amanda	
2001	Girl from Rio	Cathy	
2007	Snow White: The Sequel	Sleeping Beauty (voice)	English version
2007	The Christmas Miracle of Jonathan Toomey	Joan Tyler	
2016	The Truth Commissioner	Prime Minister	
2016	Distance	Jane	Short film
2017	The Foreigner	Minister Katherine Davies	
2020	Archive	House (voice)	
2021	Benediction	Edith Sitwell	
2022	Living	Mrs. Smith	
2024	Scoop	Fran Unsworth	
2024	Decoy	Vivian	Short film

=== Television ===
Year	Title	Role	Notes
1984	Annika	Karen	Mini-series; episode: "The Beginning"
1985	Happy Families	Josephine	Episode: "Madeleine"
1986	Girls on Top	Secretary	Episode: "Who's Ya Uncle Shelly?"
1987	No Place Like Home	Cheryl Pitts	Episode: "Gone Fishing"
1988	Gems	Miranda	Series 3; 3 episodes
1988	The Comic Strip Presents...	Lucy	Episode: "The Yob"
1988	Les Girls	Jenna	Episode: "Meat Market"
1988	Bread	Hotel Maid	Episode: "Christmas with the Boswells"
1989	Casualty	Carrie Langman	Episode: "Victim of Circumstances"
1989	Red Dwarf	Carol Brown (voice)	Episode: "Bodyswap". Uncredited role
1992	Nightingales	Mary	Episode: "Silent Night"
1993	Mr. Wroe's Virgins	Joanna	Mini-series; 4 episodes
1994	Seaforth	Paula Wickham / Paula Austen / Paula Longman	Mini-series; 9 episodes
1996	Screen Two	Janet Hinton	Episode: "Flowers of the Forest"
1997	The Uninvited	Melissa Gates	4 episodes
1998	Imogen's Face	Amanda	3 episodes
1998	Shot Through the Heart	Maida	Television film
1999	Bad Blood	Nina Harker	Television film
2001	The Russian Bride	Natasha Cherniavskaya	Television film
2002	Silent Witness	DCI Carol Deacon	Episodes: "The Fall Out: Parts 1 & 2"
2002	Heartbeat	Lady Ashfordly	Episode: "A Many Splendoured Thing"
2002	Arena	Mrs. Sands	Episode: "Harold Pinter - Part 1: The Room"
2003	Sparkling Cyanide	Ruth Lessing	Television film
2004	May 33rd	Ella Wilson	Television film
2005	The Last Detective	Dawn Luscombe	Episode: "Three Steps to Hendon"
2005	A Touch of Frost	Sylvia Ford	Episode: "Near Death Experience"
2006	Agatha Christie's Marple	Nellie Bligh	Episode: "By the Pricking of My Thumbs"
2009	Doc Martin	Edith Montgomery	Series 4; 8 episodes
2010	Arena	Various characters	Episode: "Harold Pinter: A Celebration"
2012	Secret State	Laura Duchenne	Mini-series; 4 episodes
2013	Lewis	Emma Barnes	Episodes: "The Ramblin' Boy: Parts 1 & 2"
2015	Midsomer Murders	Maggie Markham	Episode: "The Dagger Club"
2016–2022	The Crown	Wallis, Duchess of Windsor	Main role (Seasons 1–2). Guest role (Season 5)
2016	The Missing	Nadia Herz	Series 2; 7 episodes
2017	Strike	Liz Tassel	Episodes: "The Silkworm: Parts 1 & 2"
2018	Kiri	Alice Warner	Mini-series; 4 episodes
2019–2022	His Dark Materials	Dr. Cooper	Recurring role; 5 episodes
2019–2026	The Capture	DSU Gemma Garland	Series 1–3; 17 episodes
2020	Riviera	Dr. Emilie Mathieu	Episodes: "Coup de Grace" & "Two Graves"
2021	Death in Paradise	Grace Verdinikov	Episodes: "Music to My Ears" & "Fake or Fortune"
2021	Britney	Janet	Short television film
2022	The Lazarus Project	Ambassador Belov	2 episodes
2024	Mr Bates vs The Post Office	Paula Vennells	Mini-series; 3 episodes
2024–present	The Day of the Jackal	Isabel Kirby	8 episodes
2025–2026	MobLand	Emily Gutwell	2 episodes

== Stage ==
Year	Work	Role	Venue	Ref
1984	Daisy Pulls It Off	Sybil Burlington	Gielgud Theatre	
1986–1988	When Did You Last See Your Trousers?	Tove	Garrick Theatre	
1990	Body Language	Angie Dell	Stephen Joseph Theatre	
1991–1992	The Revengers' Comedies	Karen	Strand Theatre	
1992–1993	Oleanna	Carol	Theatre Royal, Bath and Royal Court Theatre	
1993	King Lear	Goneril	Royal Court Theatre	
1995–1996	Skylight	Kyra Hollis	National Theatre and Royale Theatre	
1999–2001	Celebration / The Room	Suki / Mrs. Sands	Almeida Theatre and Lincoln Center	
2001	The Homecoming	Ruth	Gate Theatre and Comedy Theatre	
2002	Mappa Mundi	Anna	National Theatre	
2003	The Eccentricities of a Nightingale	Alma Winemiller	Gate Theatre	
2005	Eric Larue	Janice Larue	The Attic Theatre	
2005–2006	As You Like It	Rosalind	Royal Shakespeare Theatre and Novello Theatre	
2007	My Child	Woman	Royal Court Theatre	
2007	The Hothouse	Miss Cutts	National Theatre	
2007	Absurd Person Singular	Eva Jackson	Garrick Theatre	
2008	The Lady from the Sea	Ellida Wangel	Arcola Theatre	
2009	God of Carnage	Véronique Vallon	Theatre Royal, Bath	
2010	Earthquakes in London	Sarah	National Theatre	
2011	Arcadia	Hannah Jarvis	Ethel Barrymore Theatre	
2013	Old Times	Kate / Anna	Harold Pinter Theatre	
2013	A Streetcar Named Desire	Blanche DuBois	Gate Theatre	
2014	The Father	Anne	Theatre Royal, Bath	
2015	Oresteia	Clytemnestra	Almeida Theatre	
2016	Mary Stuart	Queen Elizabeth I / Mary, Queen of Scots	Duke of York's Theatre	
2018	The Prime of Miss Jean Brodie	Jean Brodie	Donmar Warehouse	
2019	The Night of the Iguana	Hannah Jelkes	Noël Coward Theatre	
2022	John Gabriel Borkman	Ella Rentheim	Bridge Theatre	
2023	The Vortex	Florence Lancaster	Chichester Festival Theatre	
2025	Macbeth	Lady Macbeth	The Other Place	

== Awards and nominations ==
Year	Award	Category	Nominated work	Result
1991	Critics' Circle Theatre Award	Most Promising Newcomer	The Revengers' Comedies	Won
1992	Laurence Olivier Award	Best Comedy Performance	The Revengers' Comedies	Nominated
1996	Laurence Olivier Award	Best Actress in a Play	Skylight	Nominated
1997	Tony Award	Best Performance by a Leading Actress in a Play	Skylight	Nominated
1997	Drama Desk Award	Outstanding Actress in a Play	Skylight	Nominated
1997	Theatre World Award	Best Ensemble Performance	Skylight	Won
2001	Festival International de Programmes Audiovisuels Award	Best Actress	The Russian Bride	Won
2004	Irish Theatre Award	Best Actress	The Eccentricities of a Nightingale	Won
2005	British Academy Television Award	Best Actress	May 33rd	Nominated
2005	Royal Television Society Award	Best Actress	May 33rd	Nominated
2007	Raindance Film Festival	Best Short Film	The Stronger	Won
2007	British Academy Film Award	Best British Short Film	The Stronger	Nominated
2014	Irish Theatre Award	Best Actress	A Streetcar Named Desire	Won
2015	Evening Standard Theatre Award	Natasha Richardson Award for Best Actress	Oresteia	Nominated
2016	Laurence Olivier Award	Best Actress in a Play	Oresteia	Nominated
2018	Evening Standard Theatre Award	Natasha Richardson Award for Best Actress	The Prime of Miss Jean Brodie	Nominated
2025	Screen Actors Guild Award	Outstanding Performance by an Ensemble in a Drama Series	The Day of the Jackal	Nominated
