= Harwant Bains =

British playwright and screenwriter

Harwant S. Bains (born 1963) is a British playwright and screenwriter.

== Life ==
Harwant Bains was brought up in a mostly Sikh community in Southall, West London.

== Works ==
Stage plays

- The Fighting Kite. Theatre Royal Stratford East, November 1987.
- Blood. Royal Court Theatre. London: Methuen, 1989.
- True Love Stories.
- Indian Summer. National Theatre, 1995. In Making Scenes: Short Plays for Young Actors 3, London: Methuen, 1995.

Screenplays

- Wild West. Dir. David Attwood, 1992.
- Two Oranges and a Mango. BBC, 1995.

Radio plays

- Learning the Language
- Tutti Frutti Holy Man
- Grease Monkeys

Other

- 'Southall Youth: An Old-Fashioned Story', in Harwant Bains and Philip Cohen, eds., Multi-Racist Britain. London: Macmillan, 1988.
