= Tony Basgallop =

British screenwriter

Anthony John Basgallop
- Born: July 1968 (age 57–58)
- Occupation: Screenwriter
- Known for: To the Ends of the Earth

Anthony John Basgallop (born July 1968) is a British television screenwriter best known for writing Inside Men (2012), What Remains (2013), Servant (2019–2023), and the miniseries To the Ends of the Earth, an adaptation of William Golding's trilogy.

== Biography ==
Basgallop wrote an episode of Children's Ward, which aired on ITV. In 1998 he wrote an episode of Casualty, called "Toys and Boys", in series 13. The episode was watched by 12.58 million viewers. In 2000, he wrote the crime drama Summer in the Suburbs, which was directed by David Attwood.

Between 1996 and 2002, Basgallop wrote forty-four EastEnders episodes. His first episode aired on 21 October 1996 and last one on 3 December 2002. In 2001, he wrote the first episode of The Residents, and the comedy short It's Not You, It's Me. In 2004, he wrote an episode of Outlaws called The Soft Spot. In 2003 and 2004, he wrote two episodes of Teachers.

He worked again with David Attwood on an adaptation of William Golding's trilogy set on a British sea voyage to Australia. It was known as To the Ends of the Earth (2005). Basgallop worked on three of its episodes after the death of its original writer, Leigh Jackson. Starring Benedict Cumberbatch, the miniseries was nominated for two awards. The first award was the Golden FIPA for TV Series and Serials, and the second was the BAFTA TV Award for Best Drama Serial.

Basgallop wrote the TV movie The Good Housekeeping Guide (2006) and a year later, Confessions of a Diary Secretary (2007). In 2008, he wrote Hughie Green, Most Sincerely for BBC Four. The movie was nominated for the Writers' Guild of Great Britain Award for Short Form TV Drama.

Basgallop was the creator of Hotel Babylon, which first aired in 2006 and ended in 2009. He wrote Moonshot in 2009. In 2010, his episode of Being Human aired. In the same year, the television drama film Worried About the Boy was released, which was written by Basgallop. Rachel Cooke, writing in the New Statesman questioned whether he intended his script to be as funny as it turned out. Basgallop wrote three of the episodes of Sirens on Channel 4, all airing in 2011. In 2012, he wrote Inside Men.

In 2013, he wrote What Remains, which was longlisted for the drama category of the National Television Awards. What Remains was the first whodunit that Basgallop had written; in the past he had avoided detective dramas.

=== American career ===
The following year, two episodes of 24: Live Another Day written by Basgallop were broadcast on Fox, beginning his work in the States. He would then return for 24: Legacy in 2017. He has also written for Outcast, the American version of Resurrection and Berlin Station. In April 2016, it was reported that Basgallop was writing a pilot for the sci-fi thriller series Prototype. In August 2016, Deadline Hollywood reported that Syfy had passed on the series.

Most recently, Basgallop has been credited as the creator and writer for the series Servant on Apple TV+ and The Consultant on Amazon Prime Video.
