= Carlton Hotel, London =

Former hotel in London

Coordinates: 51.5078°N 0.1315°W

The Carlton, 1905

The Carlton Hotel was a luxury hotel in London that operated from 1899 to 1940. It was designed by the architect C. J. Phipps as part of a larger development that included the rebuilding of His Majesty's Theatre, which is adjacent to the hotel site. The Carlton was originally run by the Swiss hotelier César Ritz, with Auguste Escoffier as the head chef. In its early days it was one of London's most fashionable hotels and drew some customers away from the Savoy Hotel, which Ritz and Escoffier had previously managed.

The hotel lost some of its prestige after Ritz retired, but continued to trade profitably until it was badly damaged by German bombing in 1940. The British government requisitioned the building in 1942. After the Second World War the shareholders of the hotel sold the lease of the site, and the surviving parts of the building were demolished in 1957–58. The site is now occupied by the 17-storey block of the New Zealand High Commission.

== History ==
=== Origins ===
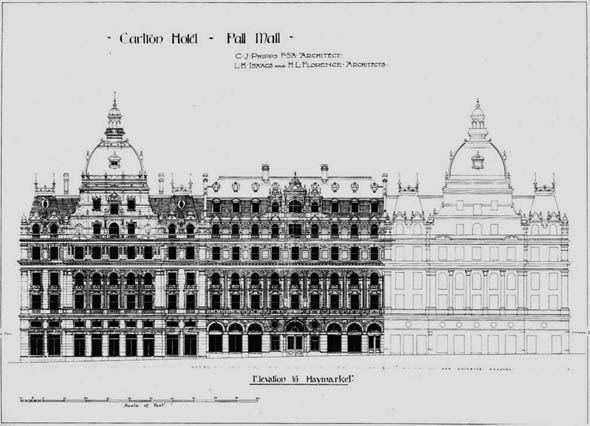
C. J. Phipps's drawings for the new hotel. The adjacent His Majesty's Theatre is shown in outline on the right.

The site, on the corner of the Haymarket and Pall Mall, part of the Crown Estate, was leased by the Commissioners of Woods, Forests and Land Revenues to the Earl of Dudley. Dudley died in 1885, when the lease had six years left to run. In 1890, the Commissioners entered into a building agreement with the property developer Tod Heatley to redevelop the site. After prolonged negotiation and litigation, the development was taken over in 1895 by Law Guarantee and Trust Society, Ltd, which commissioned the theatre architect C. J. Phipps to draw up plans to rebuild His Majesty's Theatre and to construct a hotel on the site alongside. The actor-manager Herbert Beerbohm Tree agreed to take a lease of the theatre, the Office of Woods approved the plans, and building started in July 1896.

When building work began, César Ritz and Auguste Escoffier were employed by Richard D'Oyly Carte as manager and chef de cuisine respectively at the Savoy Hotel. They were already planning to set up independently, and had established the Ritz Hotel Development Company, when Carte dismissed them both in 1897 for financial irregularities. After successfully opening the Hôtel Ritz in Paris the following year, Ritz agreed to take a 72-year Crown lease of the new hotel in London. A limited company, the Carlton Hotel, Limited, was formed. The name Carlton comes from Carlton House, the nearby former home of the Prince Regent. The company's prospectus stated:

The Hotel has been erected from plans approved by the Crown, and decorated and equipped by Messrs. Waring and Gillow, Limited. It contains upwards of 250 bed and sitting rooms, which are arranged both en suite and separately, and decorated and furnished in 18th century English and French styles. Private bath rooms are attached to the suites, and there is also ample general accommodation in this respect, there being altogether about 80 bath rooms. In addition to smoking, reading, dining, reception, and retiring rooms … the Hotel contains a Palm Court on the ground floor. … Each bed room is fitted with a telephone enabling visitors to communicate with any part of the hotel service, or to be switched on to the trunk line. Hair-dressing rooms, boy messenger service, theatre box office and every other adjunct of an hotel of the very highest order are provided.

The Palm Court of the Carlton, 1899, captioned in The Illustrated London News as "A Fashionable Resort of Today"

Construction of the hotel was not yet complete when Phipps died in 1897. The architectural partnership of Lewis Isaacs and Henry L. Florence were appointed to complete the building. The Survey of London quoted a contemporary critic, Edwin Sachs, who commented on the hotel and theatre: "The treatment is considered to be in the French Renaissance style and stone has been used throughout. The detail cannot, however, be termed satisfactory, nor does the exterior architecturally express the purpose of the building." The Survey adds, however: "Present-day connoisseurs of late-Victorian architecture are less censorious, and many will regret the partial demolition of a building which, though overspiced with eclectic details, had considerable panache."

In the prospectus, the directors of the Carlton Hotel Limited wrote, "Mr. Ritz and the Directors believe that the hotel and restaurant will at once take precedence of similar establishments in London." The most conspicuous "similar establishment" was the Savoy, which found its status as London's most fashionable hotel under threat. F. Ashburner, a biographer of Escoffier, has written, "From its opening [the Carlton] attracted much of the Savoy's clientele, including the Prince of Wales and the Marlborough House set. It paid out a dividend of 7 per cent in its first year to its influential financial and aristocratic backers, and for many years it was considered the finest hotel in London."

=== Twentieth century ===
Badge of the Carlton, 1903

Ritz's satisfaction at pulling ahead of the Savoy was short lived. At the height of the fame of the Carlton, Ritz was preparing to mark the coronation of Edward VII in 1902 with much-publicised and elaborate festivities when the king suddenly fell ill, and the coronation was postponed indefinitely. The shock caused Ritz to suffer a severe nervous breakdown and sent him into retirement, leaving Escoffier as the figurehead at the Carlton.

Richard D'Oyly Carte had died in 1901, but his son Rupert D'Oyly Carte reinvigorated the Savoy Hotel and the other hotels in his ownership, such as Claridge's. When Claridge's needed a new chef in 1904, Carte secured the services of François Bonnaure, formerly chef at the Élysée Palace in Paris. The press speculated on how much Carte must have paid to persuade Bonnaure to join him, and compared the younger Carte's audacity with his father's coup in securing Paris's most famous maître d'hôtel, M. Joseph, a few years earlier. Without Ritz, the Carlton had no hotelier of flair to compete with Carte. Nevertheless, with Escoffier presiding in the kitchens, the Carlton continued to be one of London's leading hotels, yielding substantial profits for its shareholders. Apart from two spells of poor results, the first in the early years of the First World War and the second at the beginning of the Great Depression, the Carlton remained profitable until the Second World War. The Manchester Guardian commented that the hotel's "grill room looked very old fashioned and glum in latter years, but still Mr. Andrew Mellon and other major millionaires thought it the only satisfactory place in London."

The future Vietnamese communist leader Ho Chi Minh allegedly worked at the Carlton Hotel during 1913, training as a pastry chef under Escoffier, but the claim lacks documentary evidence. Nonetheless the London Vietnam Association erected a Blue Plaque on the hotel's site marking the connection.

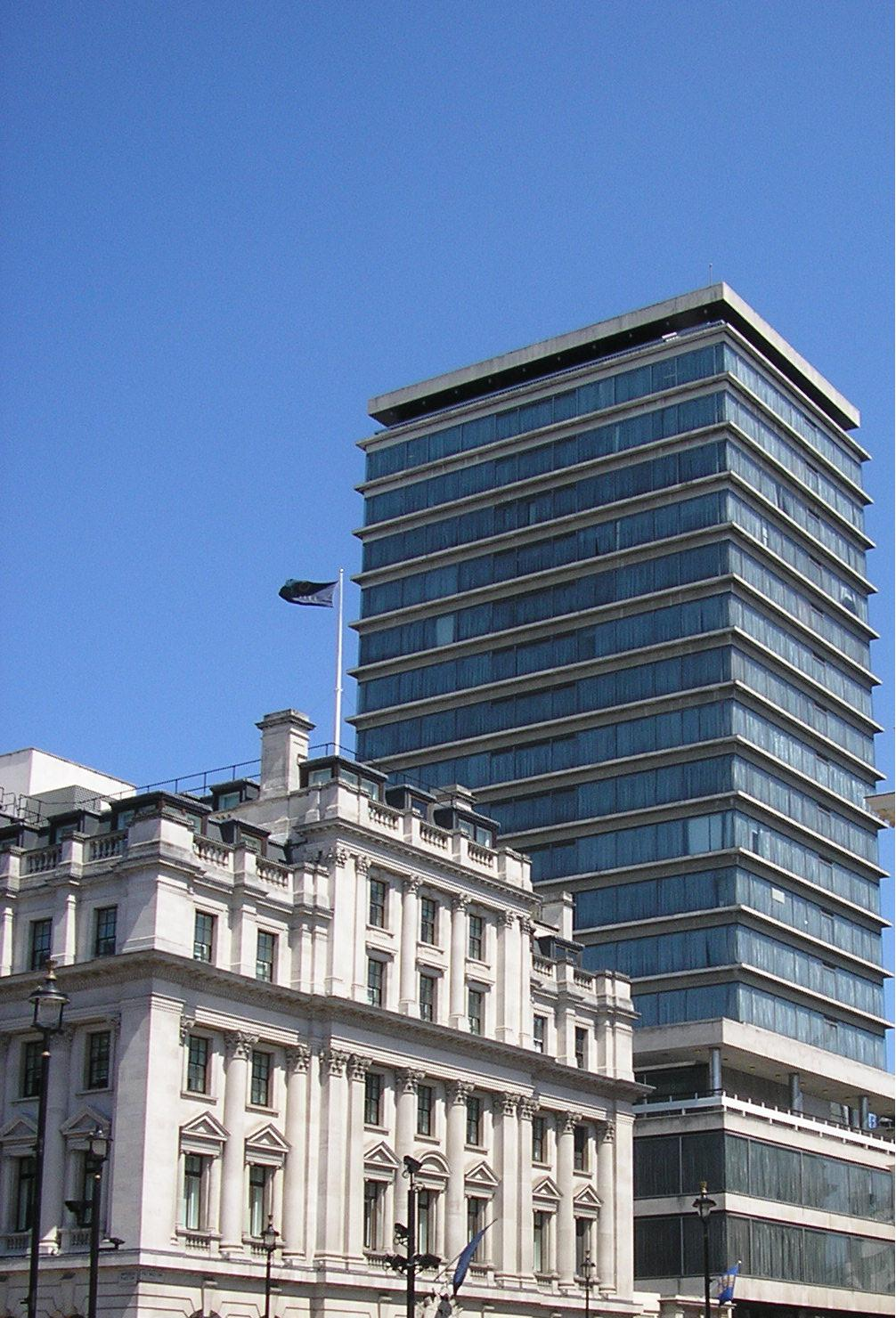
The New Zealand High Commission (right), built on the former site of the Carlton

During the Second World War the hotel was badly damaged by German bombing in 1940. The residential parts of the building were permanently closed. In 1942 remaining parts of the building were requisitioned as offices by the British government, although the American Bar and grill room of the hotel remained open. The hotel never reopened. In 1949 the company sold the unexpired portion of its lease to the government of New Zealand for £325,000; the site was proposed for the new High Commission of New Zealand. In 1951 the Carlton Hotel Limited went into voluntary liquidation. The hotel was demolished in 1957–58, and the High Commission was built on the site.

== See also ==
- List of demolished buildings and structures in London
- Carlton Hotel (disambiguation)
- The Ritz-Carlton Hotel Company: A distantly related American company
