= Victoria Hamilton =

English actress

- Born: Victoria Sharp; 5 April 1971 (age 55); Wimbledon, London, England
- Education: London Academy of Music and Dramatic Art
- Occupation: Actress
- Spouse: Mark Bazeley (m. 2008)
- Children: 2
- Awards: Evening Standard Theatre Award (2004); Critics' Circle Theatre Award (2000, 2004, 2017)

Victoria Hamilton (born Victoria Sharp; born 5 April 1971) is an English actress known for her roles in theatre and period dramas. Training at the London Academy of Music and Dramatic Art, Hamilton began appearing in productions with the Royal Shakespeare Company and the National Theatre. She starred alongside Clive Owen, and later Eddie Izzard, in the London stage play A Day in the Death of Joe Egg (2002), making her Broadway debut a year later, and earned a Tony Award nomination for Best Actress in a Play.

Hamilton has found success working in the costume drama genre. In the 1990s, she had supporting roles in three Jane Austen adaptations including Pride and Prejudice (1995), Persuasion (1995) and Mansfield Park (1999). She also played Queen Victoria in the miniseries Victoria & Albert (2001), and had roles in the series Lark Rise to Candleford (2008–2011), Doctor Foster (2015–2017), The Crown (2016–2017), and Cobra (2020–2023).

== Early life and education ==
Hamilton was born Victoria Sharp in Wimbledon, London into a non-theatrical family.

She attended St Hilary's School, an independent school in Surrey, from 1974 to 1982, then Prior's Field School, Godalming, until 1987.

She initially intended to study English at Bristol University, before opting to train at the London Academy of Music and Dramatic Art, from which she graduated.

== Career ==
Hamilton began her acting career in classical theatre, spending the first five years appearing in productions by companies such as the Royal Shakespeare Company and the National Theatre. She stayed with the Royal Shakespeare Company for 18 months. She commented in 2001 that it was "very unfashionable" to begin a career in classical theatre, but she had sought to emulate the careers of actors like Judi Dench and Ian Holm who "started in rep and slowly built themselves into the position where they could juggle theatre and film".

=== Stage ===
In 1995, Hamilton appeared in Ibsen's The Master Builder directed by Peter Hall, starring Alan Bates and Gemma Jones and performed at the Haymarket Theatre in the West End of London. The Independent described Hamilton as a "formidable talent" despite being a newcomer, and noted that she had previously appeared in two performances held at the Orange Tree Theatre in London, one of them being an adaptation of a play by James Saunders. The Master Builder earned Hamilton the Critics Circle Theatre Award for Most Promising Newcomer. She received the 2000 Critics' Circle Theatre Award for her performance in As You Like It, Crucible Theatre.

She made her Broadway debut in the 2003 play A Day in the Death of Joe Egg, co-starring alongside the comedian Eddie Izzard. She had starred with Clive Owen, and later Izzard, in a successful London production of the play the previous year, in which she and Izzard portray the parents of a girl with severe brain damage who attempt to save their marriage through jokes and black comedy. For her performance in the Broadway adaptation, Hamilton received a nomination for Tony Award for Best Actress in a Play.

The following year she appeared in Suddenly, Last Summer (2004), an adaptation of the Tennessee Williams play, performed at the Lyceum Theatre in Sheffield. For her performance, she was honoured as Best Actress by winning the Critics' Circle Theatre Award and Evening Standard Theatre Award. Her success led some of the media to brand her as "the next Judi Dench".

Hamilton took a three-year break from the stage before returning as Viola in the Shakespearean comedy Twelfth Night (2008), staged at Wyndham's Theatre in London's West End.

=== Television and film ===
Hamilton is known for working in the costume drama genre. In 2001, she joked that she had been in corsets for the preceding seven years.

During the 1990s, she had supporting roles in three adaptations of Jane Austen's novels. These include the 1995 serial Pride and Prejudice as Mrs Forster, the 1995 film Persuasion as Henrietta Musgrove, and the 1999 film Mansfield Park as Maria Bertram.

She won the role of Queen Victoria in the 2001 BBC TV production Victoria & Albert, despite facing strong competition and being relatively unknown at the time. She auditioned with the director John Erman in a London hotel suite, and after reading lines from several more scenes at his prompting, was offered the part immediately. Noting that the monarch is typically depicted as stern and stout, Hamilton desired to show a younger version who "loved parties and balls and theatre and opera and new dresses" after a childhood spent in a "forbidding environment".

In 2005, she appeared in the three-part miniseries To the Ends of the Earth alongside Benedict Cumberbatch and Jared Harris. The production, an adaptation of the novels of the same name by William Golding, featured various self-absorbed characters who are forced to remain in close quarters while sailing on a ship to Australia during the Napoleonic Wars. Hamilton described the production as having "some of the most beautiful scripts I've seen", and called her character Miss Granham "one of the strongest people on the boat".

From 2008 to 2011, she appeared in the BBC One series Lark Rise to Candleford as Ruby Pratt, one of two spinster sisters who run a high fashion shop in a small 19th-century town. The Guardian deemed Ruby's rivalry with her sister Pearl (played by Matilda Ziegler) as a highlight of the series, believing both actresses portrayed their characters with "infectious relish". In 2013, Hamilton played Peggy in the BBC drama series What Remains.

In 2015, she appeared in the BBC One drama, Doctor Foster, playing Anna Baker, a woman who lived across the road from the central characters, Gemma and Simon Foster. She reprised her role in the second series of the drama in 2017. By the final episode, her character had moved away.

In 2016 and 2017, she appeared in the first two seasons of the Netflix series The Crown as Queen Elizabeth the Queen Mother. The series, which was about the life and reign of Queen Elizabeth II, spanned six seasons between 4 November 2016 and 14 December 2023.

Since 2020, she has starred in the Sky drama Cobra as Anna Marshall, the Downing Street Chief of Staff.

== Personal life ==
Hamilton met actor Mark Bazeley while co-starring in a 2005 production of Tennessee Williams' Suddenly Last Summer. They became engaged on a beach in Greece, and married in 2008. They have two sons.

== Filmography ==
=== Film ===
Year	Film	Role	Notes	Ref
1995	Persuasion	Henrietta Musgrove		
1996	The Merchant of Venice	Nerissa	TV film	
1999	Mansfield Park	Maria Bertram		
2002	A Day in the Death of Joe Egg	Sheila	TV film	
2002	Before You Go	Catherine		
2002	Goodbye, Mr. Chips	Kathie	TV film	
2003	In Search of the Brontës	Charlotte Brontë	TV film	
2005	A Very Social Secretary	Kimberly Quinn	TV film	
2006	Scoop	Jan		
2006	Wide Sargasso Sea	Aunt Cora	TV film	
2008	French Film	Cheryl		
2010	Toast	Mum	TV film	
2016	The Circuit	Helene	TV film	
2016	Our Ex-Wife	Hillary	TV film	
2019	The Vanishing Princess	Narrator	Short film	
2020	Albion	Audrey Walters	TV film	
2021	The Trick	Ruth Jones	TV film	

=== Television ===
Year	Film	Role	Notes	Ref
1995	Screen Two	Henrietta Musgrove	Episode: "Persuasion"	
1995	Pride and Prejudice	Mrs. Forster	Miniseries; 3 episodes	
1995–1996	Cone Zone	Zandra	Regular role; 10 episodes	
1998	Performance	Cordelia	Episode: "King Lear"	
2000	Midsomer Murders	Hilary Inkpen	Episode: "Garden of Death"	
2001	Victoria & Albert	Queen Victoria	Miniseries; 2 episodes	
2001	The Savages	Jessica Savage	Regular role; 6 episodes	
2001–2002	Babyfather	Lucy Fry	Recurring role; 5 episodes	
2005	Twisted Tales	Jessie Vasquez	Episode: "The Magister"	
2005	To the Ends of the Earth	Miss Granham	Miniseries; 3 episodes	
2005	Jericho	Miss Greenaway	Episode: "To Murder and Create"	
2006	The Shell Seekers	Nancy	Miniseries; 2 episodes	
2007	Trial & Retribution	Suzy MacDonald	Episode: "Curriculum Vitae"	
2007	The Time of Your Life	Esther	Regular role; 6 episodes	
2008–2011	Lark Rise to Candleford	Ruby Pratt	Regular role; 31 episodes	
2013	What Remains	Peggy Scott	Miniseries; 4 episodes	
2014	The Game	Sarah Montag	Regular role; 6 episodes	
2015	Call the Midwife	Iris Willens	Episode: "Christmas Special 2015"	
2015–2017	Doctor Foster	Anna Baker	Regular role; 8 episodes	
2016–2017	The Crown	Queen Elizabeth the Queen Mother	Main role (Seasons 1–2); 17 episodes	
2019	Urban Myths	Joan Collins / Alexis	Episode: "The Trial of Joan Collins"	
2019	Deep State	Senator Meaghan Sullivan	Regular role; 8 episodes	
2020	Life	Belle Stone	Regular role; 6 episodes	
2020–present	COBRA	Anna Marshall	Regular role; 12 episodes	
2024	McDonald & Dodds	Dora Lang	Guest Role	
2025	Unforgotten	Juliet Cooper	Regular role; 6 episodes (a lecturer facing a formal complaint from a student)	
2025	Slow Horses	Dodie Gimball	Guest role	
2026	The Teacher	Helen Simpson	Lead role; 4 episodes	

== Selected theatre credits ==
Year	Title	Role	Venue
2003	Sweet Panic	Clare	Duke of York's Theatre, London
2004	Suddenly Last Summer	Catharine Holly	UK Tour
2005	Once in a Lifetime	May Daniels	Olivier Theatre, London
2008	Twelfth Night	Viola	Wyndham's Theatre, London
2012	Love, Love, Love	Sandra	Royal Court Theatre, London
2017, 2020	Albion	Audrey Walters	Almeida Theatre, London

== Awards and nominations ==
=== Television ===
Year	Award	Category	Work	Result
2016	Screen Actors Guild Award	Outstanding Performance by an Ensemble in a Drama Series	The Crown	Nominated
2017	Screen Actors Guild Award	Outstanding Performance by an Ensemble in a Drama Series	The Crown	Nominated

=== Theatre ===
Year	Award	Category	Work	Result	Ref.
2000	Critics’ Circle Theatre Award	Best Actress	As You Like It	Won	
2002	Laurence Olivier Award	Best Actress	A Day in the Death of Joe Egg	Nominated	
2003	Tony Award	Best Actress in a Play	A Day in the Death of Joe Egg	Nominated	
2003	Drama League Award	Distinguished Performance	A Day in the Death of Joe Egg	Nominated	
2003	Outer Critics Circle Award	Outstanding Actress in a Play	A Day in the Death of Joe Egg	Nominated	
2003	Theatre World Award		A Day in the Death of Joe Egg	Honoree	
2004	Evening Standard Theatre Award	Best Actress	Suddenly Last Summer	Won	
2004	Critics’ Circle Theatre Award	Best Actress	Suddenly Last Summer	Won	
2005	Laurence Olivier Award	Best Actress	Suddenly Last Summer	Nominated	
2017	Evening Standard Theatre Award	Best Actress	Albion	Nominated	
2017	Critics’ Circle Theatre Award	Best Actress	Albion	Won	
