= Henry L. Florence =

Henry Louis Florence
- Born: 9 June 1843
- Died: 17 February 1916 (aged 72)
- Occupations: Architect, and arts benefactor

Henry Louis Florence (9 June 1843 – 17 February 1916) was a British architect, arts benefactor and member of the Royal Institute of British Architects (RIBA), of which he was also vice-president (1897-1899) and Fellow of the Geological Society. He was a member of the Junior Athenaeum and The Arts Club. He also served in the Rifle Volunteers from 1871 to 1892, retiring from it with the rank of Lieutenant-Colonel.

== Life ==
Henry Louis Florence was privately educated before being articled to an architect's studio in 1860. He later studied at the Atelier Questel practice in Paris. In 1869 he won RIBA's Soane Medal and the following year the Royal Academy awarded him its gold medal. The Royal Academy also made him its travelling student, granting him the funds that enabled him to visit Italy later in 1870. He began to practice as an architect in 1871 in partnership with Lewis Henry Isaacs – their collaborations included completing the work of Charles J. Phipps on the Carlton Hotel, London and Her Majesty's Theatre after his death. He also later worked in practice with Herbert Arnold Satchell.

Florence's own designs include the Woolland Brothers department store in Knightsbridge; the Victoria Memorial in Kensington;, the Stourbridge and Kidderminster Bank, Worcester and the Electric Railway House, previous home of London Transport. His other designs include Holborn station, St James's Park station, the old Holborn Town Hall on Gray's Inn Road, and the Paddington branch of the London Joint-Stock Bank. He also designed several hotels (including the Holborn Viaduct Hotel, the Delahay Street Hotel in Victoria, Australia, the Empire Hotel, Lowestoft and the Coburg Hotel). He worked extensively for Edward Lloyd, building him offices at Salisbury Square in east London as well as a private mansion. At Gray's Inn he not only restored the Hall but created a new pension-room, classrooms and library. He altered and extended the United Services Club, designed the Institute of Journalists and added a library and museum to the Freemasons' Hall in London

He was an art collector and on his death he made monetary bequests to the National Gallery, British Museum and Victoria and Albert Museum. These were used to found purchase funds, known at the National Gallery as the Florence Fund and at the British Museum as the H L Florence Fund. The latter was invested, with income from the investments assigned to purchasing prints and drawings from western Europe, providing the Department of Prints and Drawings's main source of purchase funds during the Great Depression. He also bequeathed several objects to the Victoria & Albert Museum, including a vase made by Baccarat, and several paintings to the National Gallery. Florence's will also made provision for the establishment of the Henry L. Florence Studentship's Fund, which is run by The Architectural Association. Research scholars with the fund have included Scottish architect Geoffrey Copcutt. In the 1930s, another bequest by his relation, H. S. E. van der Plant, enabled the construction of the Florence Hall, London after Henry Louis which is owned by RIBA.
