= Carlton Hotel =

Carlton Hotel may refer to:

- Carlton Hotels & Suites, a hotel chain in the Middle East
- The Carlton Tower Jumeirah, London, United Kingdom
- Carlton Cannes Hotel, France
- Carlton Hotel (Atascadero, California)
- Carlton Hotel, Beirut, Lebanon
- Carlton Hotel, Christchurch, New Zealand
- Carlton Hotel (Johannesburg)
- Carlton Hotel, London, a luxury hotel that operated from 1899 to 1940
- Carlton Tel Aviv, Israel
- The St. Regis Washington, D.C., known for many decades as The Carlton Hotel and the Sheraton-Carlton
- Carlton Hotel, Sydney, 1930s
- James New York – NoMad, known as the Carlton Hotel from 1987 to 2016

== See also ==
- The Ritz-Carlton Hotel Company
- Hotel Carlton
