= Woolland Brothers =

Former department store in London

Coordinates: 51.5016°N 0.1588°W

Woolland Brothers was a department store in Knightsbridge, London, England that was located next door to Harvey Nichols until it closed in 1967.

== History ==
Woolland Brothers was started in 1869, when two brothers from Bridford in Devon took over a draper's shop at 2 Lowndes Terrace in London. The business was initially aimed at the lower echelons of society, but was noted for its good window displays. The store expanded over the years so that by 1892 it had taken over the whole of the eastern half of Lowndes Terrace (95-107 Knightsbridge). The family of three bachelor brothers Samuel, William and Moses, together with their spinster sister, were living at 17 William Street during this period.

At this time the store had grown from a drapery shop to a department store, selling items as varied as household linens, soft furnishings, outfitting, haberdashery and accessories. The store had also moved up in class and was known to serve the aristocracy, with the Duchess of Portland shopping there in 1893 at the afterseason sale. In 1896 the business embarked on rebuilding the store, demolishing the original Lowndes Terrace piecemeal and completing the exercise by 1901. The new store was constructed using a steel frame and clad in Portland stone to an elaborate design by Henry L. Florence. Copper covered domes adorned each corner.

The store continued to serve the aspiring middle classes and aristocracy, being used by Edward VII's mistress Alice Keppel, who brought her two daughters down from Edinburgh at least four times a year. The store, however, began to appear outdated and cramped by the 1930s, and even though the business owned the freehold of the entire block between William and Seville Streets, there was no further development of the store.

In 1949 Debenhams, owners of neighbouring Harvey Nichols, purchased the store. They kept the business running as a separate entity until the 1960s when it was decided unviable to run two large department stores side by side. In 1966 the property was sold and in 1967 the store was closed. In 1969 the building was demolished to make way for the Sheraton Park Tower Hotel.
