= England Expects =

- Genre: Drama
- Written by: Frank Deasy
- Directed by: Tony Smith
- Starring: Steven Mackintosh; Keith Barron; Susan Vidler; Sadie Thompson; Camille Coduri; Karl Johnson; Preeya Kalidas; Nitin Ganatra; Sadiqul Islam
- Theme music composer: Nitin Sawhney
- Country of origin: United Kingdom
- Original language: English

Production
- Producers: Ruth Caleb, Nick Ryan
- Cinematography: Tim Palmer
- Editor: Jerry Leon
- Running time: 120 min (2 parts)

Original release
- Network: BBC One
- Release: 5 April 2004

England Expects is a British television film produced by BBC Scotland in 2004. It stars Steven Mackintosh and was written by Frank Deasy. Nick Ryan, a journalist and the author of an exposé into far-right groups, worldwide (Homeland: Into a World of Hate), was the show's creative producer.

== Synopsis ==
Ex-hooligan Ray Knight (Steven Mackintosh) is a normal everyday family man living and working as a security guard at a large investment bank in Canary Wharf. He is a highly protective father to his teenage daughter Nikki (Sadie Thompson), who lives with her alcoholic mother Sadie (Camille Coduri) at their flat in a run down estate.

After a failed attempt to help Nikki and Sadie move into a new housing development, which is being competed for between Whites and Asians, and discovering that Nikki is involved in heroin addiction with her Asian neighbour and only friend Rashel (Sadiqul Islam), Ray's anger drives him to join the far-right political ring led by his old friend Larry Knowles (Keith Barron).

== Production notes ==
The film's main objective is to explore the far-right and issues of racism.
