= To the Ends of the Earth =

Trilogy of novels by William Golding

To the Ends of the Earth is a trilogy of nautical novels—Rites of Passage (1980), Close Quarters (1987), and Fire Down Below (1989)—by British author William Golding. Set on a former British man-of-war transporting migrants to Australia in the early 19th century, the novels explore themes of class and man's reversion to savagery when isolated, in this case, the closed society of the ship's passengers and crew.

The first of the books, Rites of Passage, was awarded the Booker Prize in 1980. The trilogy as a whole was adapted by the late Leigh Jackson and Tony Basgallop for a 2005 BBC drama mini-series of the same name, directed by David Attwood and starring Benedict Cumberbatch. It aired in the United States in PBS's 2006 season of Masterpiece Theatre. It became available in 2016 on Netflix and Hulu streaming, and is now available on AmazonPrime.

== Plot summaries ==
=== Rites of Passage ===
Rites of Passage, first edition cover by Cathie Felstead

Rites of Passage (1980) is an account of a six-month voyage to Australia in the early 19th century by an assorted group of British migrants on a converted man-of-war. It is in the form of a journal written by Edmund Talbot, a young aristocrat. His influential godfather has arranged for him to be employed with the Governor of New South Wales, and presents Talbot with a journal to record the significant events of the journey. He considers it a time of reflection for the young man. Talbot begins by describing the passengers of all classes (getting a tour of the ship) and crew members, who encompass a motley yet representative collection of early 19th-century English society. He becomes concerned with the downfall of passenger Reverend Robert Colley.

Talbot has a somewhat ambiguous role in Colley's fall; although he quickly assumes a mediator's role between the parson and Captain Anderson, initially he had presumed on his status by going on the quarterdeck without the captain's express invitation, about which the latter man was protective. Colley dies "of shame" after getting drunk and performing a sex act on one of the ship's crew. When one of the crew suggests officers were involved, the captain ends his investigation of Colley's death, as "buggery" (homosexual intercourse) is punishable by hanging. Talbot comes across Colley's journal, and feels guilty for seeing how eager Colley was to know him better. Colley is given a formal burial at sea. As the novel closes, Talbot is ambivalent about presenting his own journal to his godfather, as he fears it may not show him in the best light. He concludes that he does not have a choice, and eventually he seals the journal, in order to protect what he has written.

Rites of Passage won the 1980 Booker Prize.

=== Close Quarters ===
Golding begins Close Quarters (1987) from Talbot's point of view and soon after he completed his first journal on the 6-month voyage to Australia. Talbot starts a new journal in a different tone, as this volume will not be presented to his godfather. He describes his romantic feelings for a young woman whom he meets on a different ship they encounter, HMS Alcyone. Feeling ill, he expresses his fears about the seaworthiness of his own ship and its ability to complete the journey. The book has a more traditional structure, with chapter breaks at dramatic moments (rather than the day-by-day account presented in Rites).

=== Fire Down Below ===
Fire Down Below (1989) closed the trilogy with a description of the ever-more perilous voyage (given the old ship and old charts); of Talbot's maturing and his growing admiration for the Prettimans, a married couple; of the rivalry between the two principal officers, Summers and Benét, for Captain Anderson's respect and trust; and of the conclusion to Edmund's affaire de coeur with Miss Chumley. Much detail is given to the increasingly frantic measures to repair the ship and reach Australia.

== Miniseries adaptation ==
In 2005, the books were adapted as a BBC drama serial starring Benedict Cumberbatch. Named To The Ends of the Earth, the series was directed by David Attwood and received a positive critical reception. The series went on to be nominated for six BAFTAs, and won both the Golden Nymph prize for best actor in a mini-series (awarded to Benedict Cumberbatch) and the winner of the Satellite Award for best mini-series.
