= What Remains (TV series) =

2013 British television drama series

- Genre: Crime; Drama
- Written by: Tony Basgallop
- Directed by: Coky Giedroyc
- Starring: Alex Arnold; David Bamber; Claudie Blakley; Denise Gough; Jessica Gunning; Victoria Hamilton; Steven Mackintosh; Amber Rose Revah; David Threlfall; Russell Tovey; Indira Varma
- Theme music composer: Harry Escott
- Composer: Harry Barnes
- Country of origin: United Kingdom
- Original language: English
- No. of series: 1
- No. of episodes: 4 (list of episodes)

Production
- Executive producer: Hilary Salmon
- Producer: Grainne Marmion
- Production location: London
- Running time: 60 minutes
- Production company: BBC Drama Production

Original release
- Network: BBC One; BBC One HD
- Release: 25 August – 15 September 2013

What Remains is a four-part British television drama series that was first broadcast on BBC One on 25 August 2013. The last episode was broadcast on 15 September 2013. It was written by Tony Basgallop and directed by Coky Giedroyc.

== Plot ==
A body is discovered in the attic of a tenement house in Coulthard Street. The body is the remains of Melissa Young (Jessica Gunning), a young woman who owns the top flat and whose death has been unnoticed for two years. Detective Len Harper (David Threlfall) investigates. Disturbed by Melissa's unnoticed death and to stave off his own isolation, he practises archery and unofficially continues the investigation past his retirement, after his colleagues close the case as a suicide.

The occupants of the house are nominally happy: young couple Michael Jenson (Russell Tovey) and the pregnant Vidya Khan (Amber Rose Revah) have just moved in; couple Elaine Markham (Indira Varma) and Peggy Scott (Victoria Hamilton) are designers; journalists Kieron Moss (Steven Mackintosh) and girlfriend Patricia Keenan (Claudie Blakley) are discussing further commitment. Middle-aged maths teacher Joe Sellers (David Bamber) secretly shares his flat with the far younger Liz Fletcher (Denise Gough), who cooks for him domestically but whose relationship with him is otherwise left vague.

Len searches Melissa's flat and is assaulted by Liz, who escapes without him seeing her face. He discovers that Elaine and Peggy used Melissa in a photo shoot for an underwear catalogue. Melissa later tried to get out of this with a lawyer, causing Elaine to threaten her physically. Vidya creates a social networking profile for Melissa and tracks down one of Melissa's friends who took part in a slimming group with her. Her friend describes Melissa in a different way from how her neighbours did and she mentions that Melissa had a boyfriend. (He is later identified as Kieron, on the rebound between his divorce and Patricia.)

When Kieron's son, Adam Moss (Alex Arnold), meets his father's girlfriend, Patricia, Adam reacts suggestively towards her, making her feel uncomfortable. When Michael and Kieron discuss the case, Kieron drinks. Because of his inability to handle alcohol (shown in flashback to his relationship with Melissa), he attempts to rape Patricia. She fights him off and moves out. Peggy tries to slash her wrist but is derided by Elaine for not completing the attempt. She is imprisoned in the flat by Elaine, who ties Peggy to the bed. Michael discovers Liz is living in Joe's flat and escalates his campaign against Joe by starting an affair with Liz despite caring nothing for her.

Joe eventually discovers Michael's affair with Liz. Perturbed, Joe assaults one of his pupils and, while being arrested, spontaneously confesses to the murder of Melissa. Previously Joe had cared for Melissa's ill mother, but Melissa moved in and displaced him. Len thinks Joe consequently resented Melissa, and this resentment was Joe's motive for murdering Melissa. The police believe that Joe is the true killer and hold him to be tried. But Joe's confession was false. Some years previously Liz had murdered her abusive stepfather and Joe had helped her evade the police by allowing her to live undetected in his flat. Increasingly unstable, Liz had wandered through the other flats when the owners were absent and Joe's confession is a ruse to deflect blame from Liz, who Joe believes was Melissa's killer.

Kieron, ashamed of his past drunkenness and wishing to make things right with Patricia, punishes Adam's own bad behaviour by disowning him. He allows Patricia to write an article about Melissa's death, even though the article will reflect poorly on Kieron. But when Patricia speaks to Len's former colleague Alice Yapp (Lisa Millett), Alice learns that Len has stayed on the case even though he's retired. Alice remonstrates with Len but Len has grown suspicious of Liz, and persuades Alice that Liz may be the true killer. Realising that Vidya is alone in the house with Liz, they race to the house.

Before they arrive, Liz confronts the heavily pregnant Vidya, tells her about Liz's affair with Michael and attacks her. However Len and Alice arrive and arrest Liz before she can injure Vidya and her unborn child. Michael protests that his affair with Liz was only a means of punishing Joe. Vidya believes him but realises what Michael has not: by focusing on his revenge instead of caring for her he has revealed he is too immature to bring up a child and maintain a relationship. Vidya throws Michael out.

Several months later things appear resolved. The police have Liz in custody, Kieron and Patricia are reconciled, Len's friendship with Vidya is stronger than ever and he moves into Melissa's flat to act in loco parentis to Vidya while she brings up her child. But while looking after Vidya's new baby son, Len discovers that Peggy has died of unspecified causes and the by-now entirely unhinged Elaine has hidden Peggy's body in the bath, refusing to let her lover leave her even beyond death. Len's discovery is interrupted when Elaine appears behind him and stabs him. Vidya finds the badly injured Len on her return and hides, but Elaine works out that Vidya and her baby are hiding in the attic and follows her up there. It seems that history is about to repeat itself.

But although the place where Vidya hides is the place where Melissa was killed, Elaine is not Melissa's killer. Flashbacks reveal that the real killer of Melissa was Peggy: Melissa told Elaine that Peggy was planning to move out and Peggy, unable to admit to Elaine that this was true, killed Melissa. Instead of notifying the authorities, Elaine used Peggy's guilt to ensure that Peggy never left her, leaving Melissa's body in the attic to further that aim.

Vidya and Elaine evade each other in the dark attic until Vidya manoeuvres Elaine between herself and the attic trapdoor. Vidya pushes Elaine through the trapdoor and Elaine hits the floor below by Len's flat. Elaine attempts to get back, but the badly injured Len had managed to reach his flat while they fought and shoots Elaine with his bow. Elaine and Len lie injured and bleeding on the floor, possibly mortally: Vidya, uninjured but distraught, descends from the attic and sits by Len. The police arrive and Vidya rises to let them in, but Len bids her stay with what may be his final words: he doesn't want to be alone.

== Cast ==
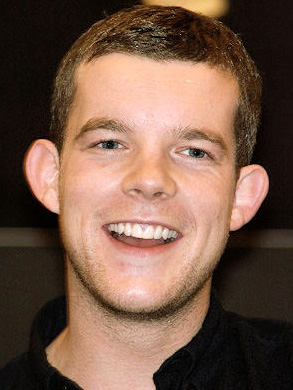
Russell Tovey played Michael Jenson

=== Main cast ===
- Alex Arnold as Adam Moss
- David Bamber as Joe Sellers
- Claudie Blakley as Patricia Keenan
- Denise Gough as Liz Fletcher
- Jessica Gunning as Melissa Young
- Victoria Hamilton as Peggy Scott
- Steven Mackintosh as Kieron Moss
- Amber Rose Revah as Vidya Khan
- David Threlfall as DI Len Harper
- Russell Tovey as Michael Jenson
- Indira Varma as Elaine Markham

=== Supporting cast ===
- Lisa Millett as Alice Yapp
- Daniel Godward as Jerry Harper
- Martha Mackintosh as Peri
- Michael Colgan as Richard Webb
- Ziggy Heath as Alex Harper
- Terence Beesley as DCI Burrows
- Michael Webber as Frank

== Production ==
When Tony Basgallop was in Los Angeles, he understood the importance of having a plot which could be reduced to three or four sentences. What Remains was the first whodunit that he had written; in the past he spent most of his career avoiding detective dramas. He commented that "the key to writing and casting What Remains has been in ensuring that we had the right chemistry between the characters".

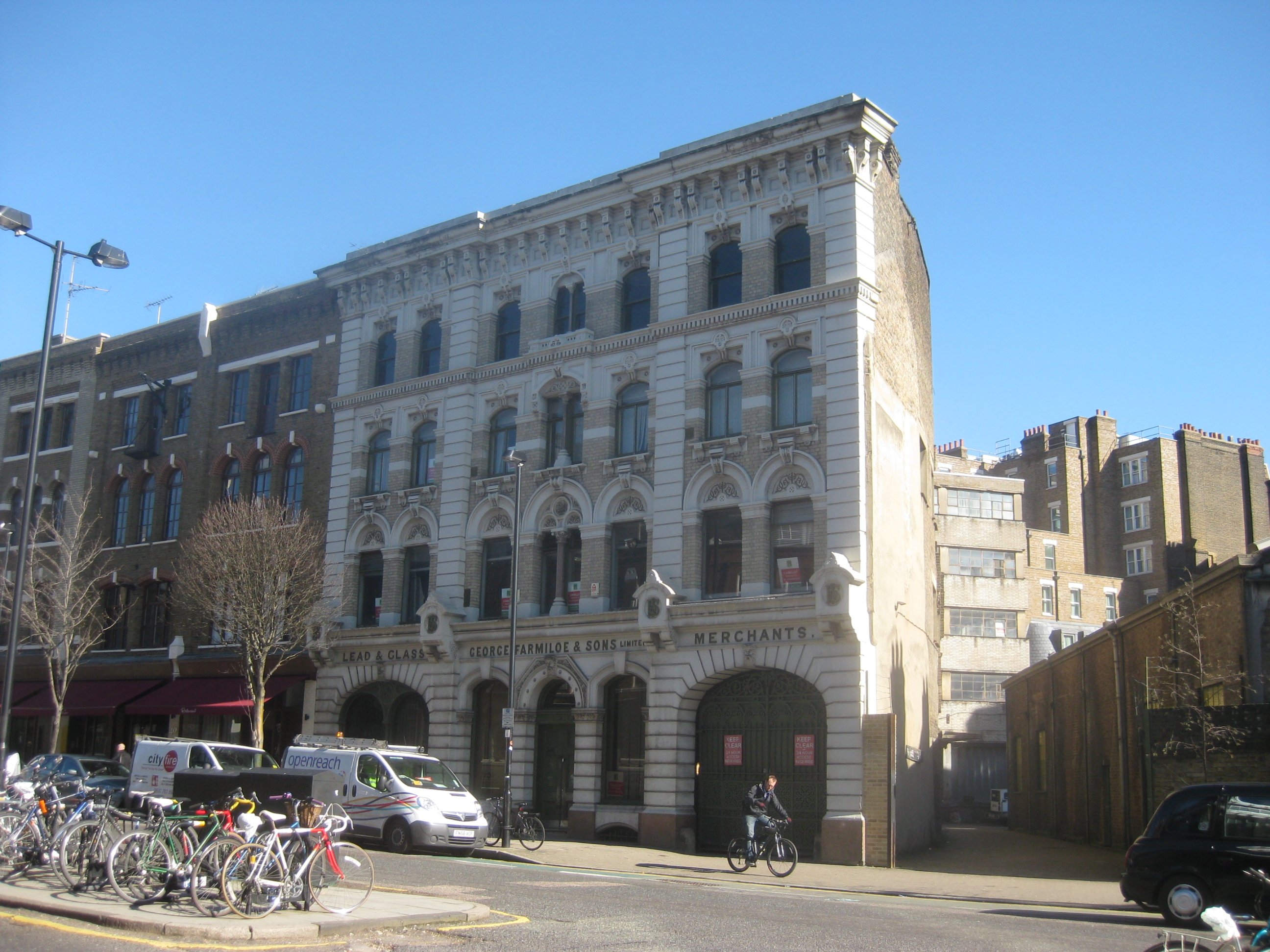
The Farmiloe Building in Clerkenwell, London

Lisa Marie Hall, the production designer for What Remains knew that the house where the four-part whodunit was set would be "a pivotal character, as menacing and awkward as its inhabitants" when she first read the script, and she designed it "to make sure the audience could never quite see the whole picture". Her team built the whole set at Ealing Studios and Wimbledon Studios because she wanted "full control of the layout and architectural detail of the house and no location would allow us this freedom". The exterior of the house is located on Eliot Park in Lewisham. The Farmiloe Building in Clerkenwell was also used in What Remains.

Indira Varma, who plays graphic designer Elaine Markham, had her flowing dark curls cut for the role and said that "getting the styling just right was crucial for bringing Elaine to life". She used Pinterest to imagine what a graphic designer's hair style would be like. David Threlfall, who plays Len Harper, was also seen by a hairdresser after playing Frank Gallagher in Shameless. The actor said there was not much of a break between playing Frank Gallagher and Len Harper. He also said that "the part of Len literally landed in my lap and I fancied it. It would have been churlish to turn it down."

Alex Arnold, who plays Adam Moss, said that he did not get to meet everyone on the cast, which he thought was weird. The four-part series took 10 weeks to film.

In November 2011, the BBC announced What Remains and highlighted its commitment to Original British Drama. Post-production services for the series were provided by Technicolor SA.

In December 2013, it was announced that Sveriges Television had obtained What Remains.

== Episodes ==
| No. | Title | Directed by | Written by | Original release date | UK viewers (millions) |
|---|---|---|---|---|---|
| 1 | "Episode 1" | Coky Giedroyc | Tony Basgallop | 25 August 2013 | 6.13 |
Detective Len Harper investigates when a decomposed body is found by Michael and Vidya in the loft. Guest starring: Paul Chahidi and Sarah Malin
| 2 | "Episode 2" | Coky Giedroyc | Tony Basgallop | 1 September 2013 | 5.23 |
Now-retired Len slowly discovers how the residents of the house knew Melissa. Michael and Vidya throw a housewarming party. Guest starring: Orlessa Altass, Marshall Baron and Simon Scardifield
| 3 | "Episode 3" | Coky Giedroyc | Tony Basgallop | 8 September 2013 | 5.04 |
Vidya and Patricia follow a new lead, which leads to Kieron admitting he had a relationship with Melissa. Guest starring: Buffy Davis, Katie Kerr and Lindy Whiteford
| 4 | "Episode 4" | Coky Giedroyc | Tony Basgallop | 15 September 2013 | 5.47 |
Len is determined to find out who killed Melissa after her inquest is complete. Liz's affair with Michael is revealed to Vidya and Joe. Elaine does not allow Peggy to leave the flat on her own. Guest starring: Mark Brailsford, Ben Abell, Jamie Richards and Tom Bevan

== Reception ==
=== Ratings ===
Overnight figures showed that the first episode on 25 August 2013 was watched by 20.6% of the viewing audience for that time, with 4.48 million watching it. An episode of Vera beat the first episode in the Sunday ratings drama battle. Official ratings raised the figure to 6.13 million. The second episode on 1 September 2013 was watched by 15.6% of the viewing audience for the time with 5.23 million watching it. 16.0% of the viewing audience (5.04 million) watched the third episode on 8 September 2013. The final episode was watched by 5.47 million, with a 17.9% audience share.

=== Critical reception ===
What Remains received positive reviews. Writing in The Daily Telegraph, Ben Lawrence was impressed by What Remains and said it is a

conventional whodunit shot as arthouse cinema. There are clichés ... but they don't spoil the overall effect or the power of the story. ... it is also a gripping mystery, shot through with an unsettling stillness and clearly under the influence of those much-discussed Scandinavian imports which include The Killing.

Matthew Sweet, also writing for The Daily Telegraph, called it "a bleak picture of Britain today". Caroline Frost, writing for The Huffington Post said:

while Broadchurch and Southcliffe tapped into the collective effect of a crime on a tightknit community, What Remains does the opposite – highlights just how it's possible for people to get lost, and stay very alone, in a big city, where close living conditions no longer mean close neighbours, in fact, often the opposite in our desperate struggle for personal space. Anybody believing a tale like this is ridiculously far-fetched could do worse than watch the moving and disturbing Dreams of a Life starring Zawe Ashton. Equally surprising, and based on a true story. Writer Tony Basgallop confidently juggles the intertwining strands of this onion-layered tale.

The Guardian's Stuart Jeffries said: "What Remains breathes new life into cop drama cliches ... he [Tony Basgallop] has made something new from a brace of cop-drama cliches".

Zoe Williams, writing for Radio Times said: "What Remains functions brilliantly as a whodunnit, but has a profundity that keeps it turning over in your head". Alison Graham, who also writing for Radio Times called it a "melancholy, sinuous crime drama", and because it aired on Sundays, she called it "brave scheduling, as What Remains doesn't exactly scream post-beer-soaked-bank-holiday-Sunday-barbecue wind-down watching".

Arifa Akbar, writing for The Independent, commented that "not all [British detective dramas] are as creepily compelling as this. While it based itself, quite simply, around one house and its neighbours, its strength lay in its complex interweaving of lives, along with the growing, rather than diminishing, fear that swarmed the crime scene". The Daily Express called it "a gripping whodunnit". Nathan Bevan, a columnist for WalesOnline said that he "rather liked the Columbo-like ways of DI Len Harper and was gripped by the overblown gothic melodrama of the final 15 minutes" and he would be "more than happy to tune into for a second series".

Gabriel Tate called it "the latest compelling serial to add to 2013's remarkable roster ... a pleasure to watch such a well-cast ensemble working through such a tightly crafted narrative, while the undertones of isolation and insecurity will be familiar to most big city dwellers. Very promising indeed" in Time Out. Unreality Primetime said it was "well written and thought-provoking ... the best murder mystery programme since Broadchurch". Keith Watson, writing for Metro, said that "What Remains was about loneliness as much as murder". The New Statesman said:

[the series] is clearly intended to be not so much a whodunnit as a why-oh-whydunnit; its writer, Tony Basgallop (Hotel Babylon, Inside Men), seems to be more interested in the way we live now than in weapons and motives. You will have gathered that I think his script strains credulity and that he's very lucky indeed his cast includes the likes of Threlfall and Bamber.

Gerard O'Donovan, writing for The Daily Telegraph, said:

What Remains served up such a thumper it made me very glad I'd persisted through the four, at times glacially slow-moving, episodes that built inexorably up to its inventively baroque denouement. There's been a rash of highly original crime-drama finales this year (Broadchurch, The Fall, Top of the Lake, Southfield) and this wasn't far short of the best. Sure, it was contrived, and convoluted to boot. But it delivered such a smack of satisfaction, most other niggles could be forgiven.

The Guardian's Sam Wollaston said "In trying to tie up its ends, others have come loose, so what you're left with is a bit of a frayed, knotty mess. Disappointing at the end then, but mainly because what came before had been so very good." The Independent called it "a reassuringly baroque and nail-biting end to a brilliant crime drama". Keith Watson for Metro said that What Remains "was a brave attempt to combine a murder mystery with human drama and, to its credit, there was a genuinely disorienting sense of uncertainty about a closing sequence that packed more action into ten minutes than the previous three hours and 50 minutes." Ben Walsh of The Independent gave it four out of five stars and said "David Threlfall excels as the retired detective who can't let this case go, and, up until the bonkers and gothic last 10 minutes, this is beautifully paced TV."

=== Awards ===
What Remains was longlisted for the drama category of the National Television Awards.

== Home media ==
Acorn Media UK released the series on DVD on 7 October 2013.
