= Tessa Peake-Jones =

British actress (born 1957)

- Born: 9 May 1957 (age 69); Hammersmith, London, England
- Education: Royal Central School of Speech and Drama
- Occupation: Actress
- Years active: 1978–present
- Television: Only Fools and Horses (1988–2003); Grantchester (2014–)
- Partner: Douglas Hodge (1984–2013)
- Children: 2

Tessa Peake-Jones (born 9 May 1957) is an English actress who has appeared in many plays and series on British television. She played Raquel in the BBC sitcom Only Fools and Horses (1988—2003) and Mrs. Maguire in the ITV drama Grantchester (2014–).

== Early life and education ==
Peake-Jones was born on 9 May 1957 in London, to her mother Mary. She was raised in Hammersmith and educated at Kenmore Park Junior School, Harrow and Downer Grammar School (now known as Canons High School), leaving in 1973, before training at the Royal Central School of Speech and Drama.

== Career ==
Peake-Jones is best known for playing Raquel Turner, the longtime partner of main character Derek "Del Boy" Trotter (played by David Jason) in the television comedy Only Fools and Horses from 1988 to 1993, in 1996, and from 2001 to 2003.

She had a co-starring role in the 1999 television series Births, Marriages, and Deaths. Her other television appearances include Bergerac, The Demon Headmaster, Midsomer Murders, Casualty, Holby City, The Bill, Up the Garden Path and So Haunt Me.

Peake-Jones appeared in the BBC adaptation of Iris Murdoch's The Bell (1982). She also played the role of the bookish sister Mary Bennet in the BBC serial adaptation of Pride and Prejudice (1980). 2007 saw her at the National Theatre as Irene in The Five Wives of Maurice Pinder by Matt Charman.

For the Royal Shakespeare Company, she appeared as Ophelia in Hamlet and Luciana in The Comedy of Errors in a UK tour, 1987–88, and as Helma in The Park by Botho Strauss at the Barbican in London in 1995.

In March 2008, she appeared as a member of staff in the Channel 4 psychiatric hospital drama Poppy Shakespeare. In both 2009 and 2011, Peake-Jones played Sue Bond in the BBC daytime soap opera Doctors. In 2013, she appeared in the Doctor Who Christmas episode "The Time of the Doctor" playing a character called Marta. Since 2014, Peake-Jones has appeared in Grantchester as Mrs. Maguire, the vicar's religious and cantankerous housekeeper.

In 2019, Peake-Jones appeared on the ITV show All Star Musicals, singing "Mamma Mia" from the musical Mamma Mia!.

== Personal life ==
Peake-Jones' former partner is actor Douglas Hodge, from whom she separated in February 2013 after 27 years together. They have two children.

== Filmography ==
=== Film ===
Year	Title	Role	Notes
2005	The Undertaker	Widow	Short
2010	1st Night	Mrs. Hammond	
2010	The Long Lonely Walk	Nurse	Short
2014	Bonobo	Judith	
2019	The Devil Went Down to Islington	Mrs. Robertson	
2019	After Louise	Bryony	

=== Television ===
Year	Title	Role	Notes
1978	Fallen Hero	Sonia Jackson	Episode: "1.4"
1979	Telford's Change	Elizabeth Cowley	TV series
1979	The Danedyke Mystery	Angela Horton	TV series, 6 episodes
1980	Pride and Prejudice	Mary Bennet	TV miniseries
1988–1996, 2001–2003	Only Fools and Horses	Raquel Turner	TV series; 19 episodes
1982	The Bell	Dora Greenfield	TV series, 4 episodes
1983	The Two Gentlemen of Verona	Julia	Part of the complete BBC Shakespeare
1983	Bergerac	Reporter	TV series, Episode: “Come Out Fighting”
1984	Cockles	Annette Smith	Episode: "Flotsam and Jetsam"
1984	Strangers and Brothers	Irene Eliot	Episodes: "1.8", "1.9"
1985	Charters & Caldicott	Jenny	TV miniseries
1986	The Oldest Goose in the Business	Lorna	TV film
1987	Tickets for the Titanic	Penelope	Episode: "Keeping Score"
1987	Screen Two	Anita	Episode: "Quartermaine's Terms"
1987	When We Are Married	Nancy Holmes	TV film
1987	What the Butler Saw	Geraldine Barclay	Orton's play, part of Theatre Night series
1988	Rockliffe	Mrs. Cunningham	Episode: "Lie of the Land"
1988	The Bill	S.O.C.O Sue	Episode: “Digging up the Past”, “A Fair Appraisal”
1989	Hard Cases	Mary Milverton	Episodes: "2.1", "2.4"
1989	Anything More Would Be Greedy	Jonquil Vickery	TV miniseries
1990, 1995, 2010	Casualty	Esther Macauley, Jenny Hodges, Tina Flannery	Episodes: "Big Boys Don't Cry", "Trials & Tribulations", "A Better Past"
1990–1993	Up the Garden Path	Maria Shadwell	Main role
1992–1994	So Haunt Me	Sally Rokeby	Main role
1996–1998	The Demon Headmaster	Mrs. Hunter	Regular role
1997	The History of Tom Jones: a Foundling	Bridget Allworthy	BBC miniseries
1998, 2016	Midsomer Murders	Sarah Lawton, Mary Appleton	Episodes: "Faithful unto Death", "Breaking the Chain"
1999	Births, Marriages and Deaths	Molly	TV series
2000	Summer in the Suburbs	Sandra Lyle	TV film
2000	Fish	Catherine Manby	Episode: "Another Shade of White"
2001	The Bill	Sharon Munson	Episode: "Happy and Glorious"
2001	Waking the Dead	Fiona Maitland	Episodes: "Every Breath You Take: Parts 1 & 2"
2001	The Lost World	Hilda Summerlee	TV film
2001	Holby City	Maggie Latham	Episodes: "Runaway", "Winner Takes All"
2005	Dalziel and Pascoe	Emma Collins	Episodes: "Dust Thou Art: Parts 1 & 2"
2008	Poppy Shakespeare	Rhona	TV film
2008	Heartbeat	Jocelyn Middleton	Episode: "Hey Hey LBJ"
2009	Agatha Christie's Poirot	Val Bland	Episode: "The Clocks"
2009–2011	Doctors	Sue Bond	Recurring role
2010	The Secret Diaries of Miss Anne Lister	Mrs. Rawson	TV film
2011	Marchlands	Evelyn Bowen	TV miniseries
2012, 2016	Holby City	Imelda Cousins	Recurring role (series 15), guest (series 19), 9 episodes
2013	Legacy	Joyce Thoroughgood	TV film
2013	Doctor Who	Marta	Episode: "The Time of the Doctor"
2014–present	Grantchester	Mrs. Maguire	Leading role
2015	Unforgotten	Sheila	Episodes: "1.1", "1.2", "1.4", "1.5"
2019	Shakespeare & Hathaway: Private Investigators	Cynthia Sly	Episode: "No More Cakes and Ale"
2025	The Feud	Barbara	Main Role
