= Shot Through the Heart (film) =

- Based on: "Anti-Sniper" by John Falk
- Written by: Guy Hibbert; John Falk
- Directed by: David Attwood
- Starring: Linus Roache; Vincent Perez
- Countries of origin: Canada; United States; United Kingdom; Hungary
- Original language: English

Production
- Running time: 112 minutes
- Production companies: Company Pictures; HBO Pictures

Original release
- Network: HBO; BBC
- Release: October 4, 1998

Shot Through the Heart is a 1998 television film directed by David Attwood, shown on the BBC and HBO in 1998, which covers the Siege of Sarajevo during the Bosnian War. The film is based on a true story and an article called "Anti-Sniper" by John Falk (published in the November 1995 issue of Details magazine). It won a Peabody Award in 1998.

== Plot ==
The horrors of war are examined from the view points of lifelong friends and expert sharpshooters Vlado Selimović (Linus Roache) and Slavko Stanic (Vincent Perez), who end up on opposing sides of the Bosnian War in Sarajevo. Slavko, an ethnic Serb and unemployed bachelor, becomes a sniper and instructor training the Army of Republika Srpska snipers who used to terrorize the city. Vlado, a Muslim married father and successful owner of a furniture factory, rejects his friend's offer to gain an escape from the city. Instead, he becomes a marksman in the Army of the Republic of Bosnia and Herzegovina and attempts to counter the sniper threat. Vlado soon realizes his friend, an exceptionally skilled marksman, is the enemy sniper responsible for a number of seemingly impossible shots against residents of their own neighbourhood. The two friends eventually have to face-off and only one survives.

== Cast ==
- Linus Roache as Vlado Selimović
- Vincent Perez as Slavko Stanić
- Lia Williams as Maida Selimović
- Adam Kotz as Miso
- Soo Garay as Amela
- Lothaire Bluteau as Zijah
- Laura Petela as Lejla Kovačević

== Miscellaneous ==
- The story was also the feature of an episode of Dateline NBC in 1998.
