= Inside Men =

2012 British drama TV series

- DVD cover
- Genre: Crime drama
- Created by: Tony Basgallop
- Directed by: James Kent
- Starring: Steven Mackintosh; Ashley Walters; Warren Brown; Kierston Wareing; Paul Popplewell; Nicola Walker; Hannah Merry; Ruth Gemmell
- Country of origin: United Kingdom
- Original language: English
- No. of series: 1
- No. of episodes: 4

Production
- Producers: Robbie Sandison; Colin Wratten
- Running time: 60 minutes
- Production company: BBC Productions

Original release
- Network: BBC One
- Release: 2 February – 23 February 2012

Inside Men is a British television drama series, consisting of four episodes, transmitted from 2 to 23 February 2012 on BBC One. The serial was written by Tony Basgallop.

On 9 March 2012 it was reported the series would not be returning for a second run, being a one-off drama.

== Plot ==
It follows the story of an armed robbery at a secure money counting house in Bristol, the events that lead up to it, characters who work there and the aftermath. It begins with a depiction of the brutal robbery and then explores the motivations of those who committed the crime.

The three main characters are John Coniston (Steven Mackintosh), who is the seemingly straightlaced manager of the secure depot; Marcus (Warren Brown), who moves trolleys of cash; and security guard Chris (Ashley Walters).

== Cast ==
- Steven Mackintosh as John Coniston
- Ashley Walters as Chris Gower
- Warren Brown as Marcus Preston
- Kierston Wareing as Gina Jessop
- Paul Popplewell as Tom Armstrong
- Nicola Walker as Kirsty Coinston
- Hannah Merry as Olivia Doyle
- Ruth Gemmell as Rebecca Brewer
- Tom Mannion as Gordon Power
- Rebekah Staton as Sandra Chaplin
- Leila Mimmack as Dita Induani
- Irfan Hussein as Kalpesh Induani
- Gregg Chillin as Riaz Kureshi

== Production ==
The series was filmed in Bristol between June and August 2011, with filming taking place over a 10-week period.

== Episodes ==
No.	Title	Directed by	Written by	Original release date	UK viewers (million)
1	"Episode 1"	James Kent	Tony Basgallop	2 February 2012	5.23
John Coniston, loyal manager of a cash-counting house where used bank notes are taken for disposal, is forced by gunmen who hold hostage his wife Kirsty and their young daughter to cooperate in a robbery in which security guard Chris is badly injured. Nine months earlier John and Kirsty had just bought a house and Chris had befriended Dita, an Eastern European teenager sacked by John for stealing.
2	"Episode 2"	James Kent	Tony Basgallop	9 February 2012	Under 4.95
Following the robbery Marcus and his partner Gina visit Chris recovering in hospital after surgery. John recalls how he planned the heist nine months earlier. To ensure that the crime has authenticity he recruits, via a friend of Marcus, the menacing Kalpesh, who agrees to assemble a team of robbers whilst Marcus is charged with holding Kirsty and her daughter hostage. John deliberately fails a promotion interview to another area to take part whilst Chris informs his drunken, cynical mother that Dita is expecting his child.
3	"Episode 3"	James Kent	Tony Basgallop	16 February 2012	4.45
John's assertive side takes over as he plans the heist, getting annoyed with Marcus for letting his partner Gina in on the plan. She does prove useful when it comes to buying masks for the robbers and will give Marcus his alibi. Chris moves, with Dita, into his mother's house after watching her choke to death. He decides he wants out but John forces him to carry on. John hires a new security guard Riaz, who will be one of the robbers and who falls out with Chris.
4	"Episode 4"	James Kent	Tony Basgallop	23 February 2012	Under 4.48
As the robbers rehearse their heist, nerves and tempers come to the fore. Chris, concerned for Dita and the baby, goes to the police and names John as the perpetrator of the upcoming crime. Gina is also delegated to hold Kirsty and her daughter to ransom as Marcus's inside knowledge of the building is useful. Following the robbery, Kalpesh is arrested trying to leave the country, whilst John, Marcus and Chris meet to divide their spoils, but Chris turns on John, who confesses that he planned the whole affair for the feeling of power.

== Critical reception ==
Andrew Pettie of The Telegraph said of the opening episode: "Steven Mackintosh is the most ordinary actor I have ever seen. Even now, not two hours after watching him play the lead role in Inside Men, I can scarcely remember what he looks like. There is something about his neat features and office-worker pallor that makes Mackintosh both vaguely familiar and instantly forgettable. I can’t think of anyone better at playing nobody in particular."
