= To the Ends of the Earth (TV series) =

2005 British television drama series

- Genre: Period drama
- Based on: To the Ends of the Earth by William Golding
- Written by: Leigh Jackson; Tony Basgallop
- Directed by: David Attwood
- Starring: Benedict Cumberbatch; Jared Harris; Sam Neill
- Composer: Rob Lane
- Country of origin: United Kingdom
- Original language: English
- No. of series: 1
- No. of episodes: 3

Production
- Executive producers: Hilary Salmon; Laura Mackie
- Producers: David Parfitt; Selwyn Roberts
- Editor: Philip Kloss
- Running time: 277 minutes
- Production company: Tightrope Pictures in association with BBC

Original release
- Network: BBC Two
- Release: 6 July – 20 July 2005

To the Ends of the Earth is a three-part BBC television miniseries adaptation of the trilogy of novels of the same name by William Golding. It premiered in the United Kingdom on BBC Two in July 2005, and in the United States on PBS as part of Masterpiece Theatre in October 2006.

Starring Benedict Cumberbatch and Jared Harris, the series was critically acclaimed with The New York Times calling it "an intriguing drama" and The Guardian "the best TV drama of the year by a nautical mile."

A BBC press release quoted Cumberbatch's description of the series as "...a sort of rock and roll 1812 period drama about a young man's gap year. It's full of filth, dirt, discovery, sex, drugs, dancing, love, spiritual awakenings and massive sweeping changes!"

== Cast ==
- Benedict Cumberbatch as Edmund Talbot
- Jared Harris as Captain Anderson
- Sam Neill as Mr. Prettiman
- Daniel Evans as Parson Colley
- Jamie Sives as First Lieutenant Charles Summers
- Victoria Hamilton as Miss Granham
- JJ Feild as Lieutenant Deverel
- Richard McCabe as Mr. Brocklebank
- Brian Pettifer as Wheeler
- John Singer as Mr. Pike
- Paula Jennings as Zenobia
- Denise Black as Mrs. Brocklebank
- Joanna Page as Marion Chumley
- Charles Dance as Sir Henry Somerset
- Cheryl Campbell as Lady Somerset
- Niall MacGregor as Lieutenant Benét
- Tom Fisher as Askew
- Jonathan Pienaar as Smiles

== Production ==
We found Benedict Cumberbatch fairly early. We needed a very good actor, someone young enough to be believable as an aristocratic, an almost slightly dislikeable character who is an adolescent in terms of his views of the world, his upbringing. But we also needed someone who could hold the screen for four and half hours, in every scene. We needed someone with experience who was not only a very good actor, but also with terrific comic timing. Benedict was the ideal answer to that.

— Director of To the Ends of the Earth David Attwood

In 2005 the books were adapted as a BBC drama serial, written in part by the late Leigh Jackson, who fell ill after completing the first film and while working on the second and third. Attwood hired Tony Basgallop to complete the work, crediting him with bringing his own voice to the project. Attwood dedicated the films to Jackson. Attwood had been interested in developing a film adaptation since reading the first novel of the trilogy, Rites of Passage.

The production crew built two ships to film. The company filmed in South Africa at Richards Bay, as they wanted to convey the feel of the tropics. They encountered heavy weather at this location. Whilst filming in South Africa, Benedict, with friends Theo and Denise, went for a weekend driving trip around Sodwana Bay. On the return their car broke down and they were carjacked. Prior to the event they had been listening to Radiohead's How to Disappear Completely, a song that when Cumberbatch hears it, "reminds [him] of a sense of reality, even humour and with it, a reason to hope that somehow I would survive a small event in a big country and escape to live a fuller life."

Original music was composed by Rob Lane for the production. Heard more than once was a Methodist hymn, "Lord, whom winds and waves obey," with words by Charles Wesley, set to "Nuremberg," alt. from Johann R. Ahle, 1664; from Hymns for the Nation, 1782.

The mini-series also aired in the United States on PBS as part of Masterpiece Theatre in 2006. In 2016, it became available on Netflix and Hulu streaming.

== Critical reception ==
The series received very good reviews. The Guardian said, "The performances are superb ... The best TV drama of the year by a nautical mile." The miniseries earned six BAFTA nominations, including one for Best Drama Serial, and Cumberbatch received the Monte-Carlo Television Festival's award for Best Performance by an Actor.

When the series aired in the United States on PBS' Masterpiece Theatre, The New York Times said "It's an intriguing drama, and depressing in a way that seems morally important, but its merits are also staked on its seeming true to life."

On Rotten Tomatoes, the series has an 81 percent approval rating.

== Dedication ==
The series was dedicated to the memory of writer Leigh Jackson, who had been working on the first episode's script when he died of cancer in 2003.

== Historical note ==
The third episode of the series trilogy, which is set in 1812, features Captain Arthur Phillip as Governor of New South Wales, when he was in fact leader of the colony from 1788 to 1792. By 1812 there had been three intervening governors. The historic Scots incumbent in office was Lieutenant Colonel Lachlan Macquarie.
