= May 33rd =

- Genre: Drama
- Written by: Guy Hibbert
- Directed by: David Attwood
- Starring: Lia Williams; Søren Byder
- Theme music composer: Rob Lane
- Country of origin: United Kingdom
- Original language: English

Production
- Producer: Hilary Bevan Jones
- Cinematography: Ulf Brantås
- Editor: Roy Sharman
- Running time: 95 minutes
- Production company: Endor Productions

Original release
- Network: BBC One
- Release: 21 April 2004

May 33rd is a 2004 British television film, produced by Endor Productions for BBC One. The film was directed by David Attwood, written by Guy Hibbert, and produced by Hilary Bevan Jones. It stars Lia Williams as Ella Wilson, a woman whose osteopath discovers she is suffering from dissociative identity disorder after years of ritual abuse.

== Cast ==
- Lia Williams – Ella Wilson
- Søren Byder – Edward Sorgesen
