= The Consultant (TV series) =

American thriller television series

- Promotional poster
- Genre: Drama; Thriller
- Created by: Tony Basgallop
- Based on: The Consultant by Bentley Little
- Showrunner: Tony Basgallop
- Written by: Tony Basgallop
- Directed by: Matt Shakman; Dan Attias; Charlotte Brändström; Alexis Ostrander; Karyn Kusama
- Starring: Christoph Waltz; Nat Wolff; Brittany O'Grady; Aimee Carrero
- Composer: Jeff Russo
- Country of origin: United States
- Original language: English
- No. of seasons: 1
- No. of episodes: 8

Production
- Executive producers: Tony Basgallop; Matt Shakman; Christoph Waltz; Steve Stark; Andrew Mittman
- Producer: Kai Dolbashian
- Cinematography: Jess Hall; Elie Smolkin
- Editors: Wendy Hallam Martin; Dan Briceno
- Running time: 30–36 minutes
- Production companies: Toluca Pictures; 1.21 Pictures; Dolphin Black Productions; MGM Television; Amazon Studios

Original release
- Network: Amazon Prime Video
- Release: February 24, 2023

The Consultant is a 2023 American thriller television series created by Tony Basgallop, based on the novel by Bentley Little and starring Christoph Waltz as the titular character, with Nat Wolff, Brittany O'Grady, and Aimee Carrero in supporting roles. The series follows the employees of a mobile gaming company whose leadership is taken over by a sinister consultant, played by Waltz.

The Consultant premiered on Amazon Prime Video on February 24, 2023, to positive reviews, with critics praising Waltz's performance but criticizing the series' writing and pace.

== Premise ==
Regus Patoff, a mysterious consultant, comes to the rescue of CompWare, a mobile gaming company, after the murder of its CEO, and seemingly starts running the company.

== Cast ==
=== Main ===
- Christoph Waltz as Regus Patoff
- Nat Wolff as Craig Horne
- Brittany O'Grady as Elaine Hayman
- Aimee Carrero as Patti, Craig's fiancée

=== Co-Starring ===
- Henry Rhoades as Tokyo
- Brian Yoon as Sang
- Tatiana Zappardino as Janelle
- Michael Charles Vaccaro as Iain
- Rumur Kristina Knowles as Lois
- Erin Ruth Walker as Amy
- Julie Sidoni as Newscaster
- Ryan Leckey as Newscaster
- Catherine Christensen as Rebecca Hood
- Ryan Bravo as Eric

=== Guest ===
- Sydney Mae Diaz as Raul
- Sloane Avery as Rosie
- Dianne Doan as Ghislane
- Jake Manley as Patrice
- Gloria John as Mama Sang

== Episodes ==
No.	Title	Directed by	Written by	Original release date
1	"Creator"	Matt Shakman	Tony Basgallop	February 24, 2023
While giving a tour of a mobile video game company, CompWare, Elaine, the company's creative liaison, allows the students to meet the CEO, Sang. After leaving his office, one of the students shoots and kills Sang. While out for a run at night several days later, one of CompWare's coders, Craig, goes to the office and talks with Elaine, and the two discuss the likely end of their company. They are surprised when a man, Regus Patoff, arrives and claims to have been hired by Sang to help the company. Patoff produces a signed document to verify that he was hired, but refers to Sang as if he is still alive and does not seem to understand the concept of mobile gaming. He has an all-hands meeting, and has strict rules for his employees; he is also unable to move up or down stairs without assistance. Craig and Elaine investigate and watch surveillance footage from Sang's office; they see Sang sign the agreement with Patoff, but then Sang immediately knelt in front of Patoff and was forced to perform fellatio.
2	"Mama"	Dan Attias	Tony Basgallop	February 24, 2023
Regus calls Elaine in the middle of the night, and tells her that Sang's mother is enroute from South Korea to the US; he asks her to stop her flight. Elaine, unable to do this, welcomes Ms. Sang when she arrives, much to the anger of Regus. Elaine and Craig research a previous company that Regus consulted with and find that the boss had been decapitated. Regus offers to personally take Mrs. Sang to her hotel, but Elaine goes to meet with her later and finds that she is missing. Craig begins producing a new game, Upskirt Jungle, that Regus enjoys playing. Elaine calls Craig to say that she thinks Regus killed Mrs. Sang, but Craig is excited that Regus has approved his game.
3	"Friday"	Dan Attias	Tony Basgallop	February 24, 2023
Elaine learns that Regus maintains a records room. While discussing his Friday night plans, Craig invites Regus to meet him at a bar. The conversation is awkward, but Regus insists that Craig join him at an exclusive party. While they are out, Elaine enters the records room and sees childhood pictures of herself. At the party, Craig is introduced to Milani, a good-looking Russian woman with a prosthetic arm, leg, and jaw. Regus asks Craig to accompany him on a delivery; Regus drives and Craig is surprised when a person wrapped in a sheet is loaded in the back of the car. Craig panics and tries to escape; when Regus stops to buy gasoline, Craig cuts open the sheet and releases Milani, who tells Craig to find someone named Frank Florez. Regus tells Craig that he was trying to help Milani, and says that he learned that he cannot trust him.
4	"Sang"	Alexis Ostrander	Tony Basgallop	February 24, 2023
In a flashback, Regus meets Sang for the first time, and offers to consult for him after he dies. Regus reveals that CompWare will go bankrupt in several weeks, and offers to help redeem Sang's image. After Sang signs up, Regus reveals that he will die within the next two weeks. In the present, Elaine learns that the company is still in financial trouble, and encourages Craig to finish Upskirt Jungle. Craig installs spyware on Regus's phone and learns the location of Frank Florez. Regus has a large statue installed of a naked Sang.
5	"Sick"	Alexis Ostrander	Tony Basgallop	February 24, 2023
Craig calls out sick from work, and goes to meet Frank Florez in Pomona. Florez is a jeweler, and becomes visibly upset when Craig mentioned Regus. Florez reveals that, over the course of several years, Regus hired him to create a skeleton out of gold. At the CompWare office, Patti, Craig's fiance, arrives to bring him lunch, and Elaine runs interference knowing that Craig called in sick. Regus offers to eat lunch with Patti, and Patti offers to help him to climb the stairs; in return, he kisses her. At Florez's store, Craig leaves when several masked intruders arrive and begin robbing the store, but are killed by Florez. Craig returns home, and tells Patti that he is sick. Patti sees that Craig took an Uber to Pomona, and knows that he is lying to her. That night, Regus texts Patti.
6	"Glass"	Charlotte Brandström	Tony Basgallop	February 24, 2023
Someone breaks a window at Craig and Patti's apartment. Craig returns to work, and finds that Regus approved the release of Upskirt Jungle, but renamed it Mr. Sang's Jungle Adventure. While Elaine and Craig meet in her office, Regus photographs them appearing intimate. As the game is in testing, Regus becomes excited learning that the game causes violent responses. Elaine meets other testers and learns that they have been self-harming due to an unbeatable section of the game. Patti leaves their house and goes to the CompWare office to meet Regus. Craig, upset that he can't beat the game, breaks a window in his apartment.
7	"Elephant"	Charlotte Brandström	Tony Basgallop	February 24, 2023
Craig is upset that Patti is not responding to him. Regus asks his employees to brainstorm marketing ideas for Mr. Sang's Jungle Adventure, and Elaine suggests that they release an elephant. Elaine contacts and manipulates Patrice, her ex-boyfriend, into releasing an illegal zoo elephant. Craig thinks he is being called several times by Patti, but the phone is in Regus's office. Craig goes out for drinks with a coworker, and flirts with her. Regus goes to the records room in the basement, where Patti is sitting in front of a typewriter.
8	"Hammer"	Karyn Kusama	Tony Basgallop	February 24, 2023
Patrice releases an elephant in Los Angeles, but it is killed during the rescue attempt. Regus goes to a robotics company and introduces himself to the CEO. Regus throws a party at CompWare to celebrate the launch of Mr. Sang's Jungle Adventure. Craig and Elaine track Patti's phone, but find Mrs. Sang playing with it, and she said that Regus gave it to her. Craig and Elaine return to CompWare, where Elaine finds Patti in the records room typing for Regus. Craig grabs a sledgehammer and breaks the glass floor underneath Regus, causing him to fall and severing his toe. Craig grabs the toe and he, Elaine, and Patti flee. Some time later, Elaine returns to work to see that her name is on the CEO door. Patti moves out of their house, and Craig cuts apart the toe, revealing a gold bone. Regus returns to CompWare to look around and then leaves. In the cell where the boy who shot Sang is being held, a newscast plays telling about the death of the robotics company CEO.

== Production ==
On November 18, 2021, it was revealed that Tony Basgallop would serve as showrunner on the TV series adaptation of Bentley Little’s novel The Consultant, with Basgallop executive producing the series along with Christoph Waltz, Matt Shakman, Steve Stark, Andrew Mittman, Kai Dolbashian through MGM Television, 1.21 Pictures, Toluca Pictures and Amazon Studios. Along with the announcement, Waltz was set to play Mr. Patoff in the series. On December 8, 2021, Brittany O'Grady and Nat Wolff were cast in the series. Filming began in December 2021 with plans to continue shooting through May 2022. Aimee Carrero was confirmed to star in March 2022.

As of 2025, Prime Video has not officially cancelled the series or renewed it for a second season.

== Release ==
On January 3, 2023, Amazon released a teaser for the series, for which they set a February 24, 2023, release date.

== Reception ==
The Consultant received generally positive reviews from critics. On Rotten Tomatoes, the series has a rating of 80% based on 44 reviews. The website's critical consensus reads, "With Christoph Waltz's menacing charm on retainer, The Consultant compensates for its lack of depth with slick presentation and diverting twists." On Metacritic, it has a score of 65 out of 100, indicating "generally favorable reviews".

John Anderson of The Wall Street Journal praised Waltz's performance, calling it "a mixed blessing in what is essentially a mystery in slow motion that keeps tilting toward comedy." However, he criticized the series' plotting and pace, stating that it "strings us along with unresolved questions, presuming we’ll stay fascinated, in a way that’s become irritatingly common among eight-part series." Daniel Fienberg of The Hollywood Reporter criticized the series as feeling "perplexingly rushed at times and oppressively elongated at others", noting the lack of stylistic cohesion between the episodes, and feeling that the series overall was "neither terrifying nor trenchant." Fienberg wrote that Waltz gave "a compulsively watchable performance that falls right into the Oscar winner’s comfort zone of seductive weirdness", but felt it too reminiscent of the actor's previous roles.

Annie Burke of The A.V. Club unfavorably compared the series to Apple TV+'s Severance, feeling that it "lacks the concentrated, speculative concept" of that series. However, she praised the production design, calling the series' fictional workplace "a character, a narrative device, and a motif all rolled into one." She too described Waltz's performance as derivative of his former roles, writing that The Consultant "amounts to Waltz reprising his role from Horrible Bosses 2 with a steely, vaguely supernatural twist." Nick Allen of RogerEbert.com criticized the series' writing for "piling on mysteries for the sake of getting stranger and stranger, without building a significant amount of tension." Kristen Baldwin of Entertainment Weekly was more positive, calling the series' story "marvelously weird and darkly funny." She praised the performances of the central cast, noting Waltz's "quiet menace", O'Grady's "wary longing", and Wolff's "winning vulnerability".
