= Canons High School =

Academy in Edgware, Greater London

Location
- Shaldon Road; Edgware, Middlesex, HA8 6AN; England

Information
- School type: Academy Academy Converter
- Established: 1950
- Closed: Open
- Authority: Harrow (310)
- Department for Education URN: 137199 Tables
- Ofsted: Reports
- Head teacher: David BULLOCK
- Staff: Around 50-200
- Gender: Coeducational
- Age: 11 to 18
- Enrolment: 1250
- Average class size: 31
- Language: English
- Hours in school day: 7
- Colours: Red and Black
- Former name: Downer Grammar School
- Website: http://www.canons.harrow.sch.uk/

Canons High School (C.H.S) is an academy school situated in Edgware, Middlesex in the eastern part of the London Borough of Harrow. It also has an attached sixth form centre which forms part of the Harrow Sixth Form Collegiate. The school was formerly known as Downer Grammar School.

== Admissions ==
The school currently teaches pupils aged 11 to 18 across six year groups. The school is currently preparing for admission of Year 7 pupils. The current Headteacher is Mr Bullock. The main feeder schools are Stag Lane, Glebe, Little Stanmore and Aylward. The school is oversubscribed.

It is situated just east of the A4140, 300 metres north of the boundary between Harrow and Brent. Queensbury Underground station is close to the south (which is on the Harrow/Brent boundary), and the Jubilee line passes close to the west. Edgware Road (A5) is about a half-mile to the east. It lies in the parish of All Saints', Queensbury.

== History ==
=== Grammar School ===
It was formerly known as Downer Grammar School. It was built in 1952 and was the first grammar school to have been built in Harrow after World War II. It was named after Thomas Downer, a magistrate from Harrow, who died in 1502. It was officially opened by the Bishop of Stepney, the Right Rev Joost de Blank in 1955.

=== High school ===
In 1974 Downer Grammar School took in the pupils of Camrose Secondary Modern School (which had opened in 1932) to form Canons High School (on the Downer site), with the Camrose site becoming a middle school. Canons had been the name of one of the four houses of the grammar school, each named after a local former country estate. Mr Becker was the headmaster during this time.

The school achieved Technology College status in 2002 and then gained a second vocational specialism.

For many years Canons High School consisted of four year groups, with the first year group being Year 8. However, in September 2008, the school established a sixth form, adding two more years (Year 12 and 13) to the school. A new Sixth Form Centre opened in September 2009. In 2010/2011 the school changed its status from a Technology college to a Science college and changed its intake years to have Year 7's in attendance.

=== Academy ===
On 1 August 2011, Canons High School officially gained academy status.

=== Ofsted ===
The school's first inspection by Ofsted after becoming an academy was in 2013, when it was judged Outstanding. It was inspected again in 2019 and judged Requires Improvement. It was inspected again in 2023 and judged Good. As of 2024, this is the most recent inspection.

== Examination Performance ==
=== GCSE Examination Performance ===
School	A*-C Pass Rate 2008	A*-C Pass Rate 2009	A*-C Pass Rate 2010	English Baccalaureate Pass Rate 2010
Canons High School	100%	67.9%	53.5%	43%
Average for London Borough of Harrow	57.7%	60.8%	60.7%	22.6%
Average for England	47.6%	50.7%	60.7%	15.1%

- The table above shows the percentage of students gaining five A* to C grades, including English and Maths
- The rightmost column shows the percentage of students gaining five A* to C grades, in five core subjects - maths; English; two science qualifications; a foreign language and either history or geography.
- Source: Department for Education
- Full GCSE results for the London Borough of Harrow

== Notable alumni ==
=== Downer Grammar School ===
- Long John Baldry, musician
- Denis Christopher Lindsay, botanist
- Tessa Peake-Jones, actress
- Keith Riglin, bishop

=== Canons High School ===
- Muktar Said Ibrahim, terrorist
