= High Commission of New Zealand, London =

Diplomatic mission of New Zealand in the United Kingdom

High Commission of New Zealand in London Te Kāinga Māngai Kāwanatanga o Aotearoa i Rānana
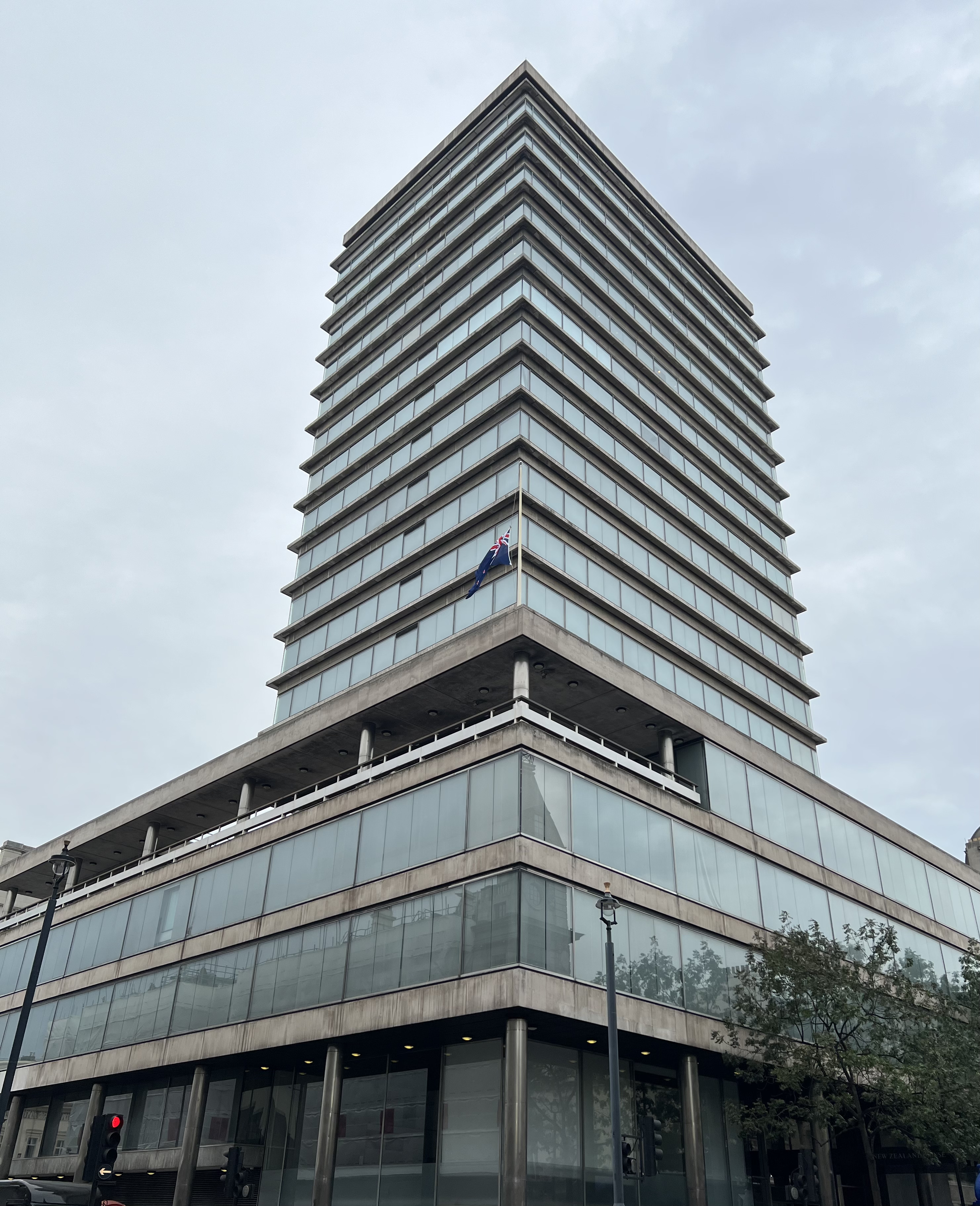
- Location: St James's, London
- Address: 1 Pall Mall East, Kinnaird House, SW1Y 5AU
- Coordinates: 51.5077°N 0.1318°W
- High Commissioner: Hamish Cooper

Listed Building – Grade II
- Official name: New Zealand House
- Designated: 24 November 1995
- Reference no.: 1242616

The High Commission of New Zealand (Māori: Te Kāinga Māngai Kāwanatanga o Aotearoa i Rānana) in London is the diplomatic mission of New Zealand in the United Kingdom. It is housed in a skyscraper known as New Zealand House on Haymarket, London, off Pall Mall. As well as containing the offices of the High Commissioner, the building also hosts the New Zealand consulate in London and the military attaché.

== History ==
The site had been previously occupied by the Carlton Hotel, destroyed by a bomb during the Blitz. The design differed from the diplomatic buildings of other Commonwealth countries in that it would be a modern skyscraper, designed by Sir Robert Matthew. After difficulties securing a planning consent, the 18 storey building only proceeded after approval was granted by the British Cabinet. The High Commission was built by Holland, Hannen & Cubitts and was opened by Queen Elizabeth II in 1963. It is the only tall building in this part of London. Since 1995, it has been a Grade II listed building.

== Responsibilities ==
It is an overseas post of the New Zealand Ministry of Foreign Affairs and Trade. The position of High Commissioner to the United Kingdom is currently held by Hamish Cooper. New Zealand Passport applications can be processed at New Zealand House. The nearest Tube stations to New Zealand House are Piccadilly Circus and Charing Cross. The Māori cultural group Ngāti Rānana holds regular meetings at the High Commission.

== Gallery ==
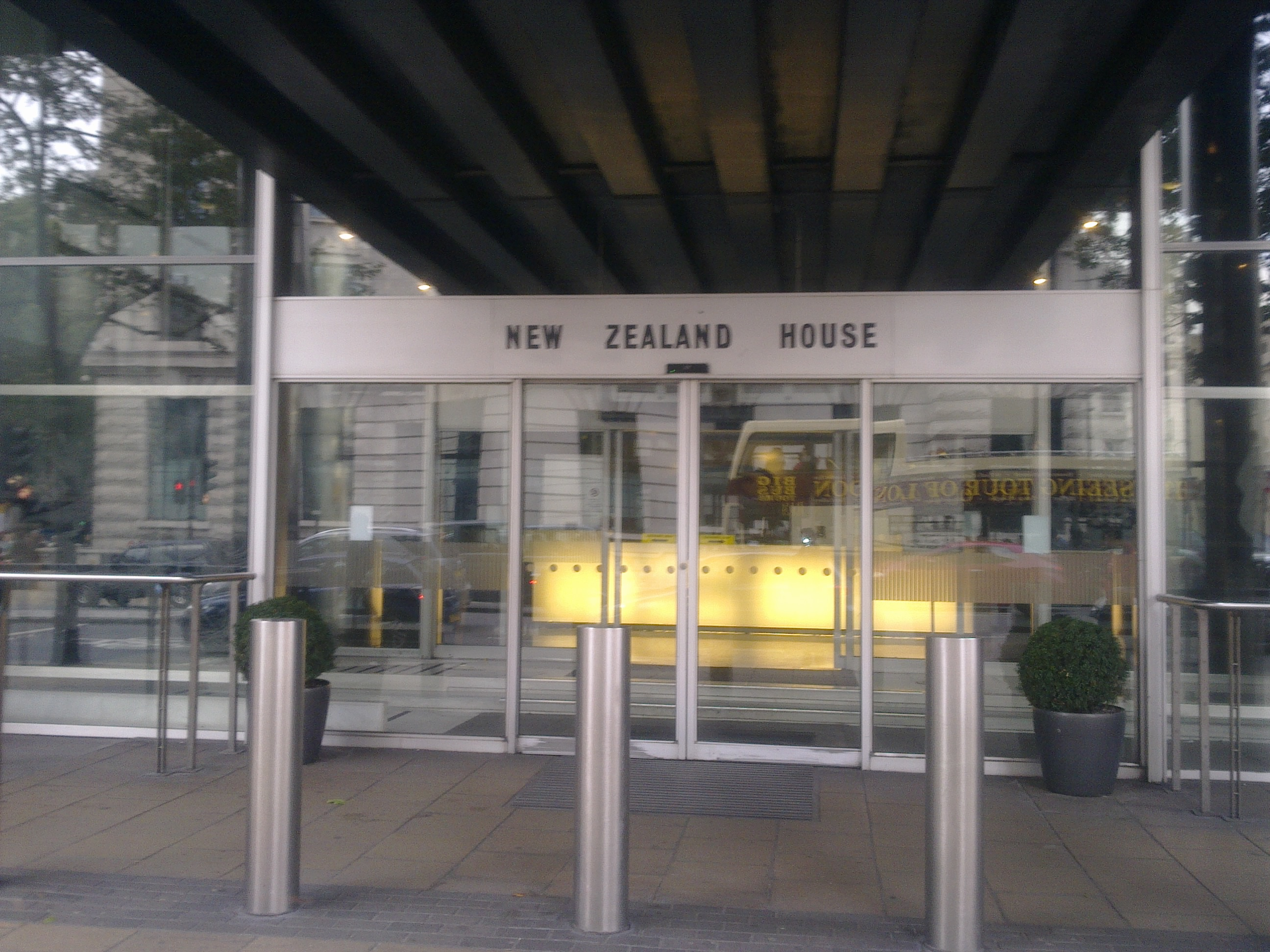
The High Commission entrance

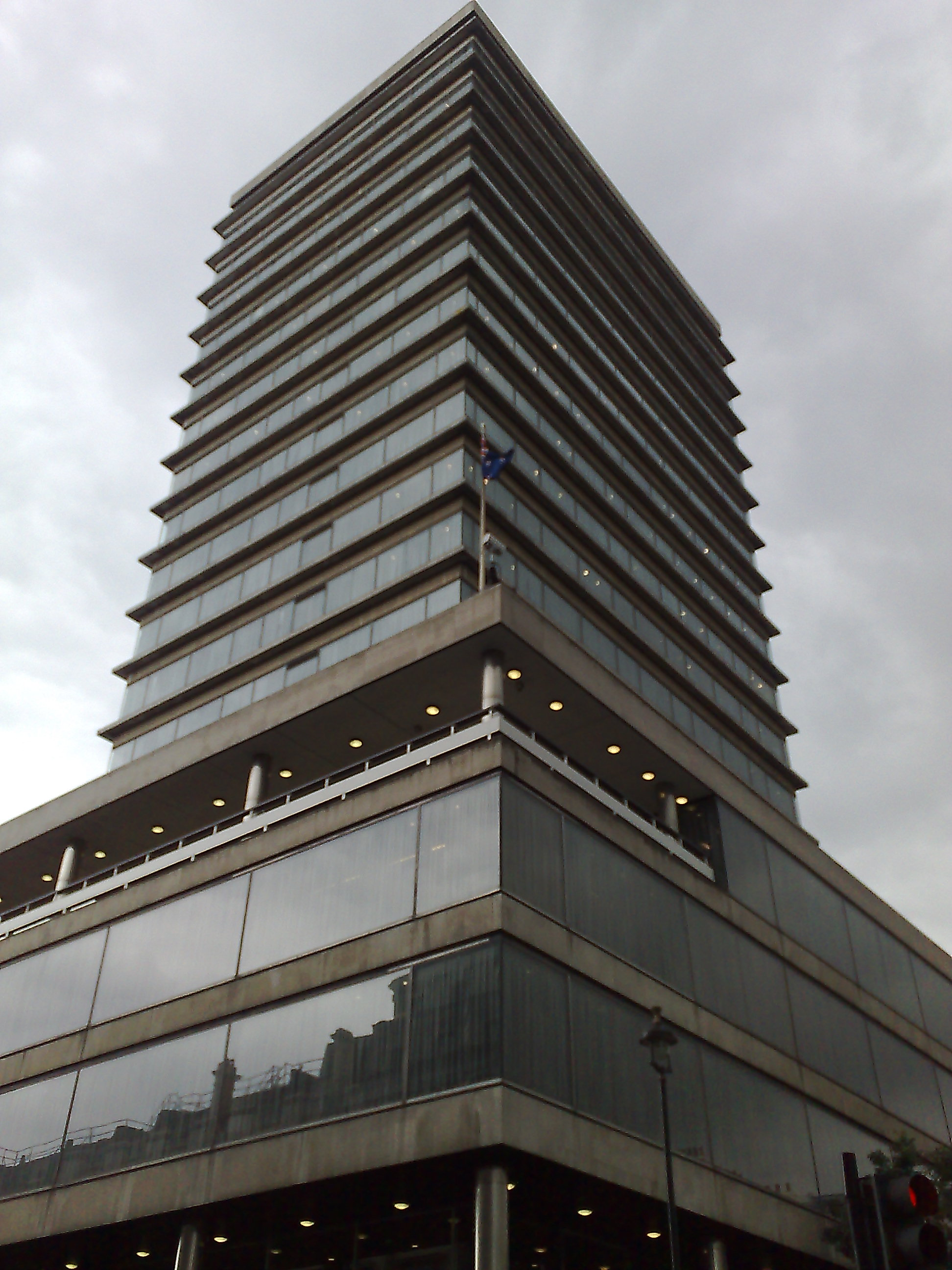
The High Commission tower

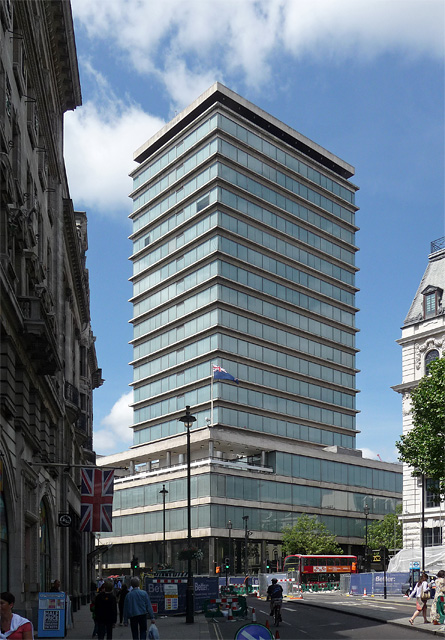
The High Commission

== See also ==
- List of high commissioners of New Zealand to the United Kingdom
