= Farmiloe Building =

The Farmiloe Building
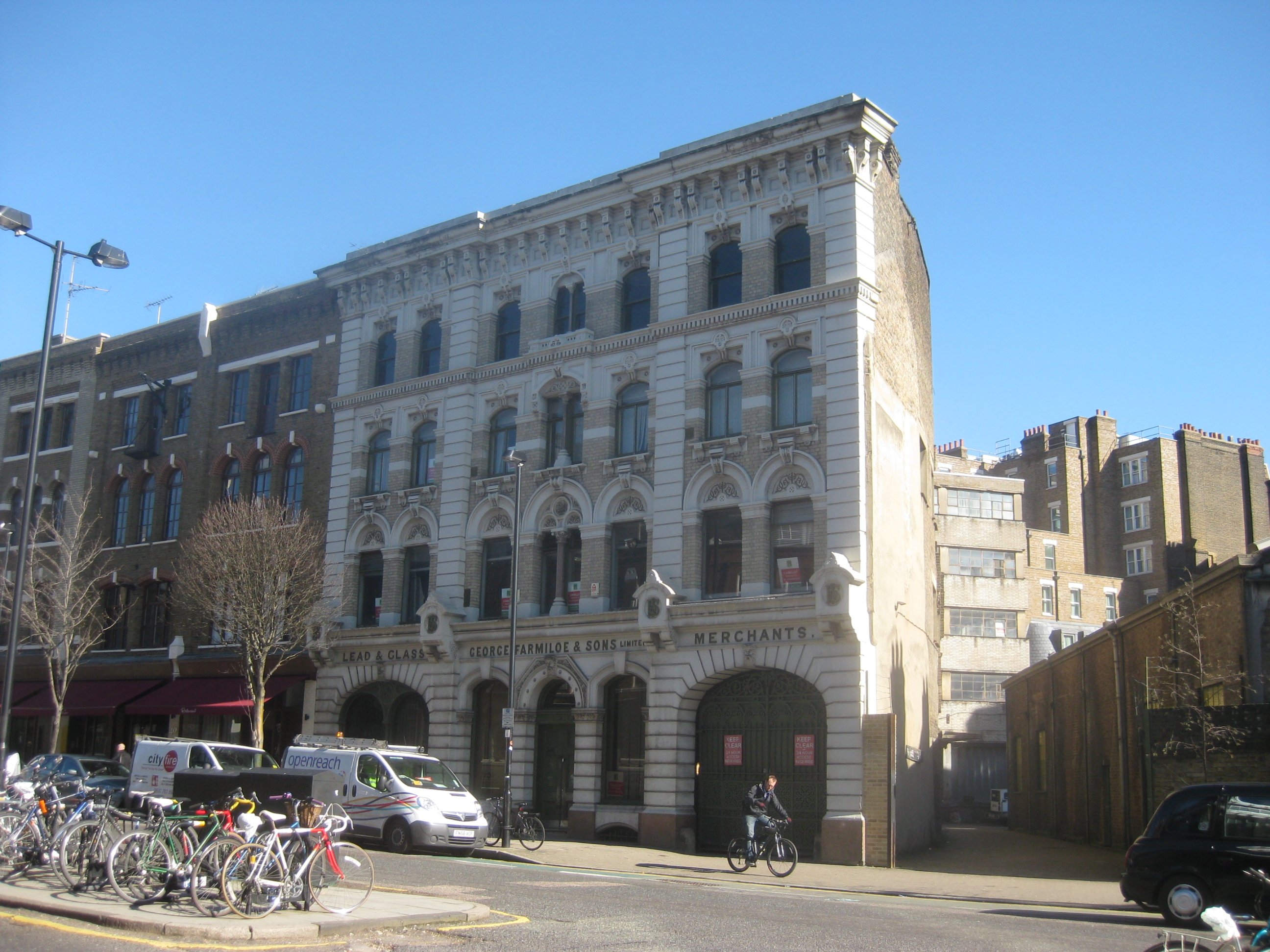
- Interactive map of the The Farmiloe Building area

General information
- Architectural style: Victorian
- Location: Clerkenwell, 34–36 St John Street, London, England
- Coordinates: 51.5207°N 0.1014°W
- Completed: 1868

Technical details
- Floor count: 3

Design and construction
- Architect: Lewis Henry Isaacs
- Main contractor: Browne & Robinson
- Designations: Grade II listed building

The Farmiloe Building is a Grade II listed building in Clerkenwell, London, in the London Borough of Islington.

== History ==
The Farmiloe Building, of Victorian architecture, was completed by Browne & Robinson in 1868. The architect for the building was Lewis Henry Isaacs. The Farmiloe Building became a Grade II listed building on 20 December 1991. The business George Farmiloe & Sons used the building as its base until 1999. In June 2005, Film London nominated the building as the location of the month. In 2014, plans were announced to transform the building into offices.

== Use in media ==
The Farmiloe Building is a popular location for filming scenes. Films and television productions that have been shot at the building include:

- Batman Begins (2005)
- Eastern Promises (2007)
- The Dark Knight (2008)
- Sherlock Holmes (2009)
- Inception (2010)
- Spooks (2011)
- Tinker Tailor Soldier Spy (film) (2011)
- The Dark Knight Rises (2012)
- What Remains (2013)
- Mission: Impossible – Rogue Nation (2015)
