= Wild West (1992 film) =

- Directed by: David Attwood
- Written by: Harwant Bains
- Starring: Naveen Andrews
- Distributed by: First Independent Films
- Release date: 1 January 1992
- Running time: 85 minutes
- Country: United Kingdom
- Language: English
- Budget: £1.32 million
- Box office: £30,349 (UK)

Wild West is a 1992 British comedy film directed by David Attwood and starring Naveen Andrews. The movie is a comedy about a Pakistani country and western band in England.

== Cast ==
- Naveen Andrews as Zaf
- Ravi Kapoor as Ali
- Ronny Jhutti as Kay
- Sarita Choudhury as Rifat
- Lalita Ahmed as Mrs. Ayub

== Reception ==
The film has a 43% rating on Rotten Tomatoes. Roger Ebert awarded the film two stars.
