= 1066 The Battle for Middle Earth =

British television documentary series

- Genre: Historical Drama
- Written by: Peter Harness
- Directed by: Justin Hardy
- Starring: Ian Holm; Mike Bailey; Francis Magee; Tim Plester; Søren Byder; Kate Ambler; Gemma Lawrence; Sam Hardy; Katrine Bach; Amber Celeste; Christopher Sloman; Christopher Leveaux
- Theme music composer: Richard Blair-Oliphant
- Country of origin: United Kingdom
- Original languages: English, Anglo-Saxon, French, Norse
- No. of series: 1
- No. of episodes: 2

Production
- Producers: Lucy Bassnett-McGuire, Susan Horth
- Running time: 150 minutes

Original release
- Release: 18 May – 19 May 2009

1066: The Battle for Middle Earth is a two-part British television documentary series, directed by Justin Hardy and written by Peter Harness, aired on Channel 4 in 2009.

In this blend of historical drama and original source material, Channel 4 re-imagines the story of this decisive year of the Norman conquest of England, not from the saddles of kings and conquerors, but through the eyes of ordinary people caught up in its events. The documentary was narrated by actor Sir Ian Holm.

The series focuses on the Sussex village of Crowhurst, which Director Justin Hardy learned about from the Domesday Book, England's earliest surviving public record. Located between the coast and Hastings, the little village was, according to the book, "laid to waste" in 1066. In the series, it serves as the hometown for the fictional peasant soldiers Tofi, Leofric, and Ordgar, whose names are actual Anglo-Saxon names from the period. Viewers may assume that the programme's title refers to The Lord of the Rings books, but Hardy chose "Middle Earth" because Anglo-Saxons frequently used the term to describe their world. He notes that J. R. R. Tolkien, an Oxford professor of Anglo-Saxon, used it, along with other Anglo-Saxon words, for the same reasons.
