= Steven Mackintosh =

English actor and narrator

- Born: 30 April 1967 (age 59); Cambridge, Cambridgeshire, England, UK
- Occupations: Actor, narrator
- Years active: 1983–present
- Spouse: Lisa Jacobs (m. 1988)
- Children: 2, including Martha

Steven Mackintosh is an English actor and narrator. He is perhaps best known for his role as Andreas Tanis in the action horror films Underworld: Evolution (2006) and Underworld: Rise of the Lycans (2009).

Mackintosh received a British Academy Television Award nomination for his leading role in the BBC One television film Care (2000). His other notable roles were in the films Lock, Stock and Two Smoking Barrels (1998) and The Land Girls (1998), as well as the first series of Luther (2010).

== Early life and education ==
Steven Mackintosh was born in Cambridge, England, the son of Dorothy Parris and Malcolm Mackintosh.

He attended Icknield Primary School in Sawston, living on 34 Queensway. He attended Sawston Village College until the age of 14, and Dramawise Theatre School, gaining 5 O-levels.

He made his stage debut, aged 14, in The Number of the Beast at the Bush Theatre in London, then landed the lead role in the National Theatre production of Brighton Beach Memoirs.

== Career ==
=== Film ===
Mackintosh's first film appearance was in Prick Up Your Ears. He went on to star in Memphis Belle, Twelfth Night, and David Leland's Land Girls with Rachel Weisz and Anna Friel and co-starred with Rupert Graves in Different For Girls as a transgender woman. He played Winston in Guy Ritchie's film Lock, Stock and Two Smoking Barrels. His other notable films include Roger Michell's The Mother, The Jacket, Good with Viggo Mortensen, Underworld: Evolution and Underworld: Rise of the Lycans. He played Tony in Rupert Wyatt's feature The Escapist and Kertzer in Film 4's The Scouting Book For Boys. Mackintosh played Ivan Lewis in the big screen version of The Sweeney. He played Jack in Set Fire to the Stars with Elijah Wood and worked with Michael Caton Jones for the second time on his film Urban Hymn.

=== Radio ===
He played Maj Sjöwall and Per Wahlöö's fictional police detective Martin Beck in the BBC Radio drama series The Martin Beck Killings.

=== Television ===
Mackintosh played a peasant boy, the Luck Child, who is prophecied to be king in Jim Henson's The StoryTeller, S1:E4. Mackintosh played DS Winter in the 10 part series Lucky Man, created by Stan Lee for Carnival films and Sky TV. He played Robbo in From There to Here by BAFTA winning writer Peter Bowker for the BBC and played John Coniston in the acclaimed Inside Men for BBC 1. His other numerous credits include: Luther, Lost Christmas, The Other Boleyn Girl, The Buddha of Suburbia, Prime Suspect and Our Mutual Friend. Mackintosh won Best Actor at the Royal Television Society Awards and a Best Actor Nomination at the BAFTAs for his role in Care for the BBC. In recent years he has become a popular choice to narrate documentaries. He replaced Jamie Theakston to narrate the BBC police documentary, Traffic Cops. He also narrates on the documentary Aircrash Confidential from Discovery Communications and Saving Lives at Sea on BBC2 since 2017.

== Personal life ==
He married the actress Lisa Jacobs on 7 November 1988 in London. They have two daughters, including Martha Mackintosh (born 1992).

== Filmography ==
=== Film ===
| Year | Film | Role | Notes |
|---|---|---|---|
| 1987 | Prick Up Your Ears | Simon Ward | |
| 1990 | Memphis Belle | Stan the Rookie | |
| 1991 | London Kills Me | Muffdiver | |
| 1992 | The Muppet Christmas Carol | Fred, Scrooge's Nephew | |
| 1994 | Princess Caraboo | Harold | |
| 1995 | The Grotesque | Sidney Giblet | |
| 1995 | Blue Juice | Josh Tambini | |
| 1996 | Twelfth Night | Sebastian | |
| 1996 | Different for Girls | Kim Foyle | Brussels International Film Festival - Best Actor |
| 1997 | It's Good to Talk | | Short |
| 1997 | House of America | Sid | |
| 1998 | The Land Girls | Joe Lawrence | |
| 1998 | It's Good to Talk | | Short film |
| 1998 | Lock, Stock and Two Smoking Barrels | Winston | |
| 1999 | The Criminal | Jasper Rawlins | |
| 2000 | Care | Davy Younger | BAFTA Cymru Award for Best Actor; RTS Television Award for Best Actor; Nominated — BAFTA TV Award for Best Actor |
| 2001 | Far from China | Noah | |
| 2002 | Eddie Loves Mary | | Short |
| 2003 | Strangers | Morgan | Short |
| 2003 | The Mother | Bobby | |
| 2003 | The Tulse Luper Suitcases, Part 1: The Moab Story | Gunther Zeloty | |
| 2003 | The Tulse Luper Suitcases: Antwerp | Gunther Zeloty | |
| 2004 | The Tulse Luper Suitcases, Part 2: Vaux to the Sea | Gunther Zeloty | |
| 2004 | The Aryan Couple | Eichmann | |
| 2005 | The Jacket | Dr Hopkins | |
| 2005 | The Secret Life of Words | Doctor Sulitzer | |
| 2006 | Underworld: Evolution | Andreas Tanis | |
| 2006 | Rang de Basanti | Mr McKinley | Bollywood film |
| 2006 | Small Engine Repair | Bill | |
| 2007 | First Born | Steven | |
| 2007 | Sugarhouse | Tom | |
| 2008 | The Escapist | Tony | |
| 2008 | Good | Freddie | |
| 2008 | The Daisy Chain | Tomas Conroy | |
| 2009 | Underworld: Rise of the Lycans | Andreas Tanis | |
| 2009 | The Scouting Book for Boys | Det. Insp. Kertzer | |
| 2011 | The Great Ghost Rescue | Brad | |
| 2012 | Elfie Hopkins | Michael | |
| 2012 | The Sweeney | D.C.I. Ivan Lewis | |
| 2013 | Z1 | Guy | Short film |
| 2013 | Kick-Ass 2 | Tommy's Dad | |
| 2013 | The Thirteenth Tale | Dr Clifton | |
| 2014 | Gold | Gerry | |
| 2014 | The Jesus Mysteries | Narrator | Documentary |
| 2014 | Set Fire to the Stars | Jack | |
| 2015 | Robot Overlords | Danny | |
| 2015 | Bone in the Throat | McDougal | |
| 2015 | A Song for Jenny | Greg | |
| 2015 | Urban Hymn | David Hinton | |
| 2017 | Modern Life Is Rubbish | Lenny | |
| 2019 | Rocketman | Stanley Dwight | |
| 2020 | The Postcard Killings | Rupert Pearce | |
| 2021 | Calving | Gordon | Short film |
| 2023 | The Shepherd | Sgt Joe Marks | Short film |

=== Television ===
| Year | Film | Role | Notes | Ref. |
|---|---|---|---|---|
| 1983 | Nanny | Tony | Episode: "The Home Front" | |
| 1984 | See How They Run | Willie Biggs | TV film | |
| 1985 | The Browning Version | John Taplow | BBC TV film | |
| 1985 | Doctor Who | Gazak | Episode: "Timelash" | |
| 1985 | Summer Season | | Episode: "Broken Homes" | |
| 1985 | The Secret Diary of Adrian Mole Aged 13 3/4 | Nigel Partridge | 6 episodes | |
| 1987 | The Diary of Anne Frank | Peter Van Daan | 3 episodes | |
| 1987 | The Growing Pains of Adrian Mole | Nigel Partridge | 6 episodes | |
| 1988 | Tickets for the Titanic | Josh | Episode: "Everyone's A Winner" | |
| 1988 | The Storyteller | Lucky | Episode: "The Luck Child" | |
| 1989 | The Woman in Black | Rolfe | TV film | |
| 1990 | Treasure Island | Dick | TV film | |
| 1990 | Surgical Spirit | Martin | Episode: "Something in the Air" | |
| 1990 | Screen One | | Episode: "News Hounds" | |
| 1990 | The Bill | Tony Martin | Episode: "Market Forces" | |
| 1991 | Agatha Christie's Poirot | Newsboy | Episode: "The Plymouth Express" | |
| 1991 | Van Der Valk | Koos | Episode: "The Little Rascals" | |
| 1991 | Perfect Scoundrels | Young Kirby | Episode: "Ssh, You Know Who" | |
| 1992 | Six Characters in Search of an Author | The Brother | TV film | |
| 1992 | Inspector Morse | DS Cheetham | Episode: "Absolute Conviction" (Series 6) | |
| 1992 | Between the Lines | P.C. Fulford | Episode: "Nothing Personal" | |
| 1992 | The Ruth Rendell Mysteries | Nicholas Virson | Episode: "Kissing the Gunner's Daughter: Part 1" | |
| 1993 | Maigret | Jacques Patillon | Episode: "Maigret and the Maid" | |
| 1993 | Screenplay | Greg | Episode: "Safe" | |
| 1993 | The Buddha of Suburbia | Charlie Kay | Miniseries | |
| 1994 | Murder in Mind | Simon | TV film | |
| 1994 | A Dark-Adapted Eye | Francis | TV film | |
| 1994 | A Touch of Frost | Dean Hoskins | Episode: "Widows and Orphans" | |
| 1994 | The Chief | Dean Mills | Episode No.4.9 | |
| 1994 | Cadfael | Liliwin | Episode: "The Sanctuary Sparrow" | |
| 1994 | The Return of the Native | Diggory Venn | TV film | |
| 1994 | Midnight Movie | Bertie | TV film | |
| 1996 | Karaoke | Waiter (Film) | Miniseries (3 episodes) | |
| 1996 | Prime Suspect | The Street | TV film | |
| 1998 | The Ebb-Tide | Swanson | TV film | |
| 1998 | Our Mutual Friend | John Rokesmith/John Harmon | Miniseries (4 episodes) | |
| 1998 | Undercover Heart | Tom Howarth | Miniseries | |
| 1999 | Bad Blood | Stephen Irving | TV film | |
| 2000 | Lady Audley's Secret | Robert Audley | TV film | |
| 2001 | Sweet Revenge | Sebastian Harper | TV film | |
| 2001 | Swallow | Stuart Collins | 3 episodes | |
| 2002 | The Many Trials of One Jane Doe | Sean Dewart | TV film | |
| 2003 | The Other Boleyn Girl | George Boleyn | TV film | |
| 2004 | England Expects | Ray Knight | TV film | |
| 2006 | Shiny Shiny Bright New Hole in My Heart | Jeremy | TV film | |
| 2006 | The Amazing Mrs Pritchard | Ian Pritchard | 6 episodes | |
| 2007 | The Beckoning Silence | Narrator | TV film | |
| 2007 | A Very British Sex Scandal | Narrator | TV film | |
| 2009 | Criminal Justice | D.I. Chris Sexton | 5 episodes | |
| 2009 | The Queen | Narrator | 5 episodes | |
| 2010 | Mo | Peter Mandelson | TV film | |
| 2010 | Luther | D.C.I. Ian Reed | 6 episodes | |
| 2011 | Camelot | Ewan | Episode No.1.5 | |
| 2011 | Aircrash Confidential | Narrator | 12 episodes | |
| 2011 | The Jury | Paul Brierley | 5 episodes | |
| 2012 | Inside Men | John | 4 episodes | |
| 2012 | Horizon – How Big Is the Universe? | Narrator | Episode 4 | |
| 2013 | What Remains | Kieron Moss | TV series | |
| 2014 | Autopsy: The Last Hours of | Narrator | 3 episodes | |
| 2014 | Operation Cloud Lab | | Miniseries | |
| 2014 | From There to Here | Robbo | TV series | |
| 2015 | The Game | Tom Mallory | Episode Two | |
| 2016 | Stan Lee's Lucky Man | Detective Superintendent Winter | 19 episodes | |
| 2016 | Traffic Cops | Narrator | Series 14 | |
| 2017 | The Halcyon | Richard Garland | 8 episodes | |
| 2018 | Kiri | Jim Warner | Miniseries | |
| 2018 | Wanderlust | Alan Richards | 6 episodes | |
| 2020 | Lawrence of Arabia: Britain's Great Adventurer | Narrator | TV documentary | |
| 2020 | Soulmates | Brother Samson | Episode: "Break on Through" | |
| 2021 | Dalgliesh | Wilfred Antsey | "The Black Tower" | |
| 2022 | The Pact | Harry | Series 2 | |
| 2022 | The Confessions of Frannie Langton | John Langton | Miniseries | |
| 2023 | Payback | Malky Roberts | 6 episodes | |
| 2023 | The Day the Queen Died: Minute by Minute | Narrator | Documentary | |
| 2024 | Senna | Frank Williams | Miniseries | |

=== Theatre ===
| Year | Title | Role | Venue | Ref. |
|---|---|---|---|---|
| 1982 | The Number of the Beast | Randy | Bush Theatre, London | |
| 1986 | Brighton Beach Memoirs | Eugene Jerome | Royal National Theatre, London | |
| 1988 | The Tempest | Ariel; Ceres | Royal National Theatre, London | |
| 1990 | Look Look | G 13 – Lee | Aldwych Theatre, London | |
| 1991 | The Glory of the Garden | Maxie Greenwood | Duke of York's Theatre, London | |
| 2000 | My Zinc Bed | Paul | Royal Court Theatre, London | |
| 2008 | In a Dark Dark House | Drew | Almeida theatre, London | |
| 2019 | Appropriate | Bo Lafayette | Donmar Warehouse, London | |

=== Audio ===
| Year | Title | Role | Notes | Ref. |
|---|---|---|---|---|
| 2000 | The Beach | Narrator | Audiobook | |
| 2007 | Wasted | Narrator | Audiobook | |
| 2011 | The Snow Goose | Philip Rhayader | Audiobook | |
| 2013 | A Martin Beck Mystery: Murder At The Savoy | Martin Beck | BBC Radio 4 | |
| 2016 | When the Night Has No Right to be King | Joshua | BBC Radio 4 | |
| 2020 | The Other Passenger | Narrator | Audiobook | |
| 2021 | Cold Justice | Narrator | Audiobook | |
| 2024 | Temporal | Narrator | Audiobook | |
