= Denis Christopher Lindsay =

British botanist and lichenologist

Denis Lindsay
- Born: 1943 or 1944 (age 81–82)
- Education: Exeter University; University of Birmingham
- Scientific career
- Fields: Lichenology
- Workplaces: British Antarctic Survey
- Author abbrev. (botany): D.C.Linds.

Denis Christopher Lindsay (born 1943/1944) is a British botanist who made contributions to the field of Antarctic lichenology as part of the British Antarctic Survey. He was among the first professional botanists to perform floristic surveys on several Antarctic islands. His seminal work, The Macrolichens of South Georgia, was one of only three treatments of Antarctic lichens published before the 21st-century.

== Biography ==
=== Early life and education ===
Lindsay attended Downer Grammar School. In 1965, the 21-year-old Lindsay was living in Kenton, London. He earned a bachelor's degree in botany from Exeter University. He later obtained his Ph.D from the Botany Department at the University of Birmingham in 1971.

=== Career ===
In 1965, Lindsay left England with the British Antarctic Survey to study lichen growth rates. The aim of the study was to determine how long the Antarctic islands have been free from a permanent ice cap. From 1965 to 1967, he was stationed on the South Shetland Islands and Signy Island. Here, Lindsay furthered the work of lichenologist Elke Mackenzie through the documentation of species and the collection of herbarium specimens. During the austral summer of 1965 to 1966, Lindsay became the first botanist to survey King George Island. He studied the floristics of both lichens and moss. While on Signy Island, he was upset after unexpectedly having to serve as meteorologist for the mission.

After the end of his first tour, Lindsay brought back living lichen specimens to Winterbourne in Birmingham. He noted their high survivorship despite the urban environment. In 1971, Lindsay published Vegetation of the South Shetland Islands, and in doing so was the first professional botanist to report on the flora of Half Moon Island and King George Island.

Lindsay returned to the Antarctic with the BAS from 1971 to 1972. He made botanical collections on the island of South Georgia, where he focused his attention on the genus Cladonia. In 1974, Lindsay published his seminal monograph The Macrolichens of South Georgia. It was one of only three treatments of Antarctic lichens published before the start of the 21st-century, the other two being Carroll William Dodge's discredited Lichen Flora of the Antarctic Continent and Adjacent Islands (1973) and Jorge Redón Figueroa's Liquenes Antarticos (1985).

From 1974 to 1976, Lindsay served as Assistant Keeper in Botany at the Leicester Town Museum. In the 1980s, he led surveyors from the Wildlife Trust for Birmingham and the Black Country to collect lichens in the West Midlands.

== Legacy ==
The lichen Parmelia lindsayana, first discovered on Signy Island, is named in Lindsay's honor. The holotype was collected by him in 1966. Ryszard Ochyra considered Lindsay "a good English lichenologist and effective collector".

Many of Lindsay's herbarium specimens are housed at the British Antarctic Survey Herbarium (AAS) in Cambridge. Others are held at the Leicestershire Museum Service Herbarium (LSR) in Leicester.

== Selected publications ==
- Lindsay, D. C. (1971). "Vegetation of the South Shetland Islands". British Antarctic Survey Bulletin (25): 59–83.
- Lindsay, D. C. (1974). The Macrolichens of South Georgia. London: British Antarctic Survey, Natural Environment Research Council. ISBN 0-85665-028-5.

In addition to his solo works, Lindsay contributed chapters to publications including Mark Seaward's Lichen Ecology (1977) and M. C. Clark's A Fungus Flora of Warwickshire (1981).

The standard author abbreviation D.C.Linds. is used to indicate this person as the author when citing a botanical name. He is incorrectly attributed as "David C. Lindsay" in Authors of Plant Names.
