= Søren Byder =

Danish actor

- Born: 20 July 1972 (age 53); Denmark
- Years active: 1996 – 2009

Søren Byder (born 20 July 1972) is a retired Danish actor.

== Career ==
- Bella min Bella (1996)
- Mørkeleg (1996)
- Hotellet (2000–2001)
- Nikolaj og Julie (2002–2003)
- Se til venstre, der er en svensker (2003)
- May 33rd (2004)
- 1066 The Battle for Middle Earth (2009)
