= Lewis Henry Isaacs =

English architect (1830–1908)

Lewis Henry Isaacs (3 January 1830 – 17 October 1908) was an English architect and surveyor and a Conservative Party politician who sat in the House of Commons from 1885 to 1892.

Isaacs was the son of Isaac Isaacs of Devonshire Square. His mother was a daughter of Lewis Henry, a merchant, of Liverpool. Isaacs was educated at the Lancaster Royal Grammar School and at University College School, London. He became an architect and worked in partnership with Henry L. Florence. He was surveyor to Holborn Board of Works and for the Society of Gray's Inn for whom he designed rooms. Isaacs was the architect for The Farmiloe Building which was completed in 1868. In 1874, he designed Cadby Hall for J. Lyons & Co. which was built in West London. He was deputy chairman of Westcombe Park Estate Co and of the District Railway. He was a Major in the 22nd Rifle Volunteers. His publications included A Treatise on Sewerage and Drainage.

At the 1885 general election Isaacs was elected as the member of parliament (MP) for Walworth. He held the seat until his defeat at the 1892 general election. Isaacs was a member of the Kensington Vestry from 1885 until it was abolished in 1901 and then an alderman for the new Royal Borough of Kensington. He was Mayor of Kensington from 1902 to 1904.

He was a Fellow of the Royal Institute of British Architects, and a Member of the Society of Arts.

Isaacs lived at Pembridge Square, Bayswater. He died at the age of 78.

Isaacs was married and had a daughter. He employed a nursery governess, Elizabeth Vincent, from 1878 to 1881, and after his wife's death in 1882 he reestablished contact with her. In 1887 she had a child by Isaacs and Isaacs made some provision for them both. In 1890 an incident occurred when she demanded money and Isaacs was shot in the arm. Vincent was indicted for attempted murder, but acquitted.

Parliament of the United Kingdom
New constituency	Member of Parliament for Walworth; 1885–1892	Succeeded by William Saunders
