= Wasted: A Childhood Stolen, An Innocence Betrayed, A Life Redeemed =

2008 memoir by Mark Johnson

- Author: Mark Johnson
- Genre: Memoir
- Publication date: 2008

Wasted: A Childhood Stolen, An Innocence Betrayed, A Life Redeemed is a 2008 memoir by British author Mark Johnson. As a child, he was severely mentally and physically abused by his father. When Mark escaped from where he lived, he turned to drugs and crime. His autobiography provides an account of his journey from self-destruction to self-fulfillment.

Born in the West Midlands in 1970, Mark became a prolific offender and embraced a lifestyle of consuming drugs and alcohol. When he escaped from his chaotic lifestyle, he set up a tree surgery business, which employed several ex-offenders and recovering addicts. Mark earned The Prince's Trust Young Achiever of the Year Award.

== Plot ==
At one point during Mark's therapy he asks: "Can someone like me ever get clean?" after he has lost most of his body weight and has been living on the streets of London. His experiences demonstrate that someone who has been in the depths of addiction can certainly get clean.

The story commences when Mark is a child. He lives with his parents as well as his brother, Shane, and sister, Kelly in Kidderminster. Shane is two years older than Mark. Mark's parents also adopt a boy named Paul. Mark's father is an aggressive alcoholic who regularly subjects Mark as well as his wife to mental and physical abuse. According to Mark, his dad never lays a hand upon or raises his voice towards Kelly. This causes Mark to resent her. Mark describes how he grows up in a house filled with anger and tension. Despite his father's horrific treatment of his son, young Mark loves his dad and sees his father as his hero. Mark sees his dad as being scary when he loses his temper. When his dad beats him with a belt, Mark describes how he becomes detached from the situation and feels as if part of him is somewhere else. Furthermore, when Mark endeavours to become close to his mother, Lorraine, she often rebuffs his attempts. Lorraine is a Jehovah's Witness. Throughout his childhood, Mark craves nourishing attention from his parents, which he seldom receives.

As a child, Mark presents as being very creative. He likes to draw, especially battles. He attributes this to the fact that he likes to fight. For example, he assault another boy who had behaved in an atrocious way towards him. Despite this fact, he looks for love from people and is unable to find it. At home, he often feels invisible. He feels a sense of escapism when he climbs trees.

Mark's social life is also chaotic because he never has a consistent group of friends. He describes how 'gangs' are always forming and re-forming. He identifies as being a suedehead (subculture). He tastes his first Strongbow Cider, which other young people offer him. He immediately becomes attracted to the powerful way the drink makes him feel. He takes drugs when they are offered to him by people who are squatting in a nearby building.

Mark then chronicles how his life changes for the worst. For example, he becomes addicted to heroin and eventually lives life on the street. He gives graphic details in terms of how he finally resorts to begging on the street and how much it shames him. Mark also tells the reader about the detrimental impact that living such a life has had upon his body. For example, when he finally is able to see a nurse, his body has deteriorated to such a harsh extent that he barely recognises himself anymore.

Although he triumphs in the end, he undergoes a colossal amount of physical and mental suffering.
