= Patrick Cremin =

British actor

Patrick Cremin is a British actor who is best known for playing Neil Brooks in Families, Brian Meade in EastEnders, The Bill, Hustle, Heartbeat, Silent Witness, Bad Girls and Casualty. He trained at the Central School of Speech and Drama.
