= David Attwood (film director) =

British television and film director (1952–2024)

- Born: 28 August 1952; Sheffield, South Yorkshire, England
- Died: 21 March 2024 (aged 71)
- Occupation: Director
- Years active: 1987–2010
- Spouse: Jane Tranter (m. 1997)
- Children: 2
- Relatives: Philip Attwood (brother)

David Attwood (28 August 1952 – 21 March 2024) was a British television and film director. His notable works include the Peabody Award-winning TV film Shot Through the Heart (1998) and the TV miniseries To the Ends of the Earth (2005), which received six BAFTA nominations. Attwood died from Alzheimer's disease on 21 March 2024, at the age of 71.

== Filmography ==
- 1987–1988 Rockliffe, 5 eps
- 1988 Airbase
- 1989 The Real Eddy English
- 1989 Tales of Sherwood Forest
- 1990 Killing Time
- 1989–1994 The Bill, 18 eps
- 1992 Wild West
- 1995 Saigon Baby
- 1996 The Fortunes and Misfortunes of Moll Flanders
- 1998 Shot Through the Heart
- 2000 Summer in the Suburbs
- 2002 Fidel
- 2002 The Hound of the Baskervilles
- 2004 May 33
- 2005 To the Ends of the Earth
- 2007 Stuart: A Life Backwards
- 2010 Blood and Oil
