= Ann Walker =

English landowner (1803–1854)

- Born: 20 May 1803; Lightcliffe, West Riding of Yorkshire, England
- Died: 25 February 1854 (aged 50); Lightcliffe, West Riding of Yorkshire, England
- Resting place: Old St Matthew's Churchyard, Lightcliffe, West Yorkshire, England
- Occupations: Landowner, philanthropist
- Partner(s): Anne Lister (1834–1840; Lister's death)

Ann Walker (20 May 1803 – 25 February 1854) was an Englishwoman, married in Britain's first known lesbian wedding, to diarist and fellow Yorkshire landowner Anne Lister. Their union was solemnised by taking the sacrament together on Easter Sunday in 1834 at Holy Trinity Church, Goodramgate, York, which bears a commemorative plaque acknowledging the event. Walker inherited half of her family's estate, Crow Nest, located in Lightcliffe, West Yorkshire, near Shibden Hall, Lister's family estate, in Calderdale. Both women inherited their respective estates during the early 19th century, when primogeniture, the custom of granting lands and property to the oldest surviving son, dominated European law and society. They were travelling abroad together when Lister fell ill and died. Research into their diaries and letters suggest Walker may have experienced bouts of anxiety and depression throughout portions of her life.

== Early life ==
Ann Walker was born on 20 May 1803 in Lightcliffe, West Riding of Yorkshire to John and Mary Walker (née Edwards). She was baptised on 1 July 1803 at Old St Matthew's Church, Lightcliffe and lived her early years at Cliffe Hill with her parents, older sisters Mary and Elizabeth, and younger brother John, until her family moved to Crow Nest when she was six years old. Ann's sister Mary died 1 February 1815. Ann was 19 when her father died on 22 April 1823, and her mother died later that same year on 3 November 1823, when Ann was 20. Ann's brother John inherited Crow Nest, the family's estate. In early November 1828, Ann's sister Elizabeth married Captain George Mackay Sutherland and moved to Ayrshire. Subsequently, after the death of their younger brother John while on his honeymoon in Naples, Italy in 1830, Ann and her sister Elizabeth became sole inheritors of the Crow Nest Estate, offering significant wealth. Ann continued to live at Crow Nest through her 20s, until 1831, when she moved into Lidgate, a smaller home on the estate. It was at Lidgate that Anne Lister began to court Ann after a re-acquaintance on 6 July 1832.

== Marriage ==
Walker and Lister became neighbours when Lister moved to Shibden Hall in 1815, but met only occasionally. It wasn't until 1832 that the pair became involved in a romantic and sexual relationship. Their relationship intensified over the next few months. Walker and Lister exchanged vows on 10 February 1834, the date they considered their union official, and exchanged rings on 27 February 1834 as a symbol of their commitment to one another. They took communion together in Holy Trinity Church, Goodramgate, York on Easter Sunday (30 March) in 1834 to seal their union, considering themselves married. The building now displays a commemorative rainbow plaque. Walker gave up her family home to be with Lister and moved to Shibden Hall, Lister's ancestral home, about September 1834. The couple travelled widely together until Lister's death, age 49, in Georgia in 1840. Walker had Lister's body shipped, six months by land and sea, back to England so that Lister could be interred in the same church as her beloved aunt and uncle in Halifax. Lister's will gave Walker a life interest in Shibden Hall and its estate.

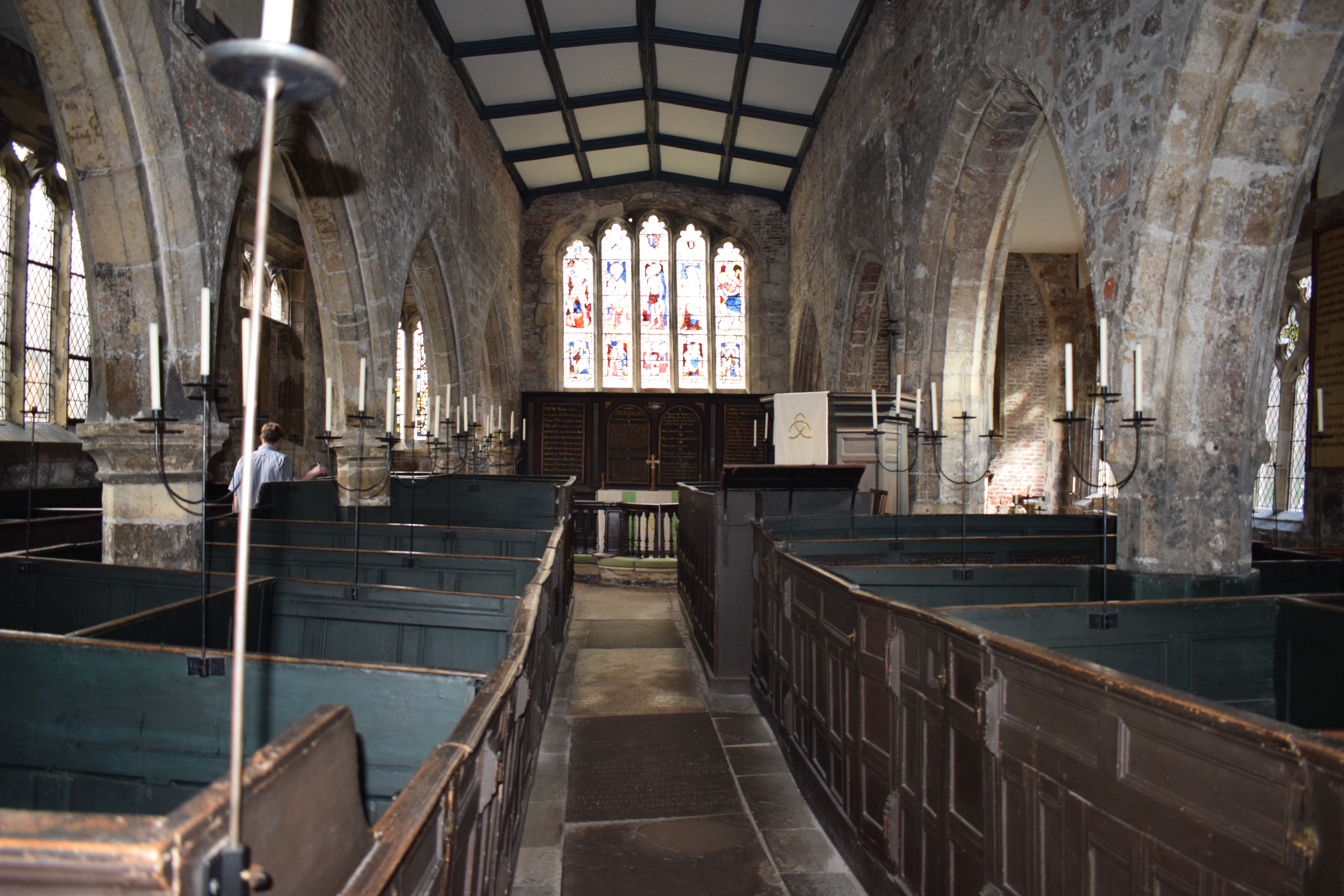
Inside Holy Trinity Church, Goodramgate, York where Ann Walker and Anne Lister took communion together in 1834 to seal their union

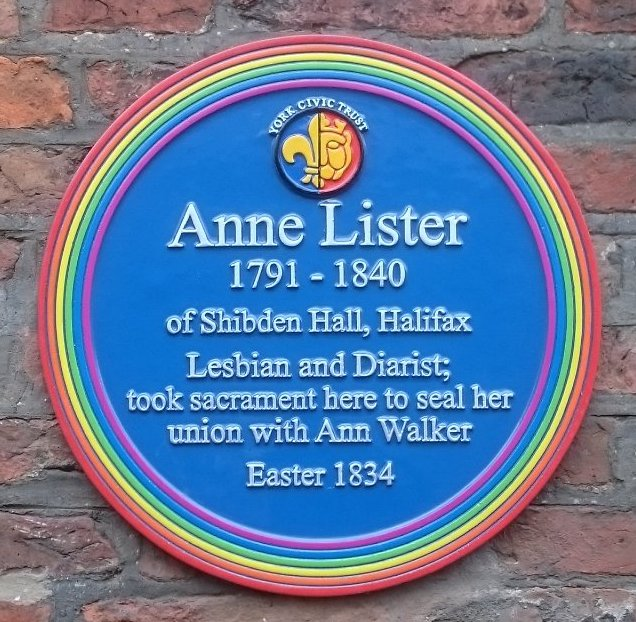
The rainbow plaque at Holy Trinity Church, Goodramgate, York commemorating the union between Ann Walker and Anne Lister

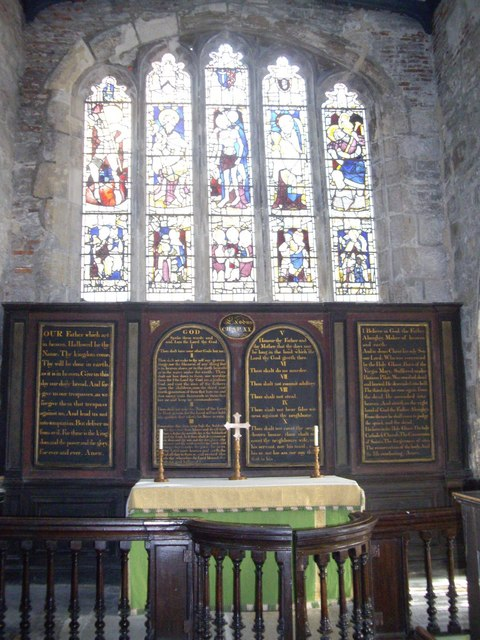
Stained glass window in Holy Trinity Church, Goodramgate, York

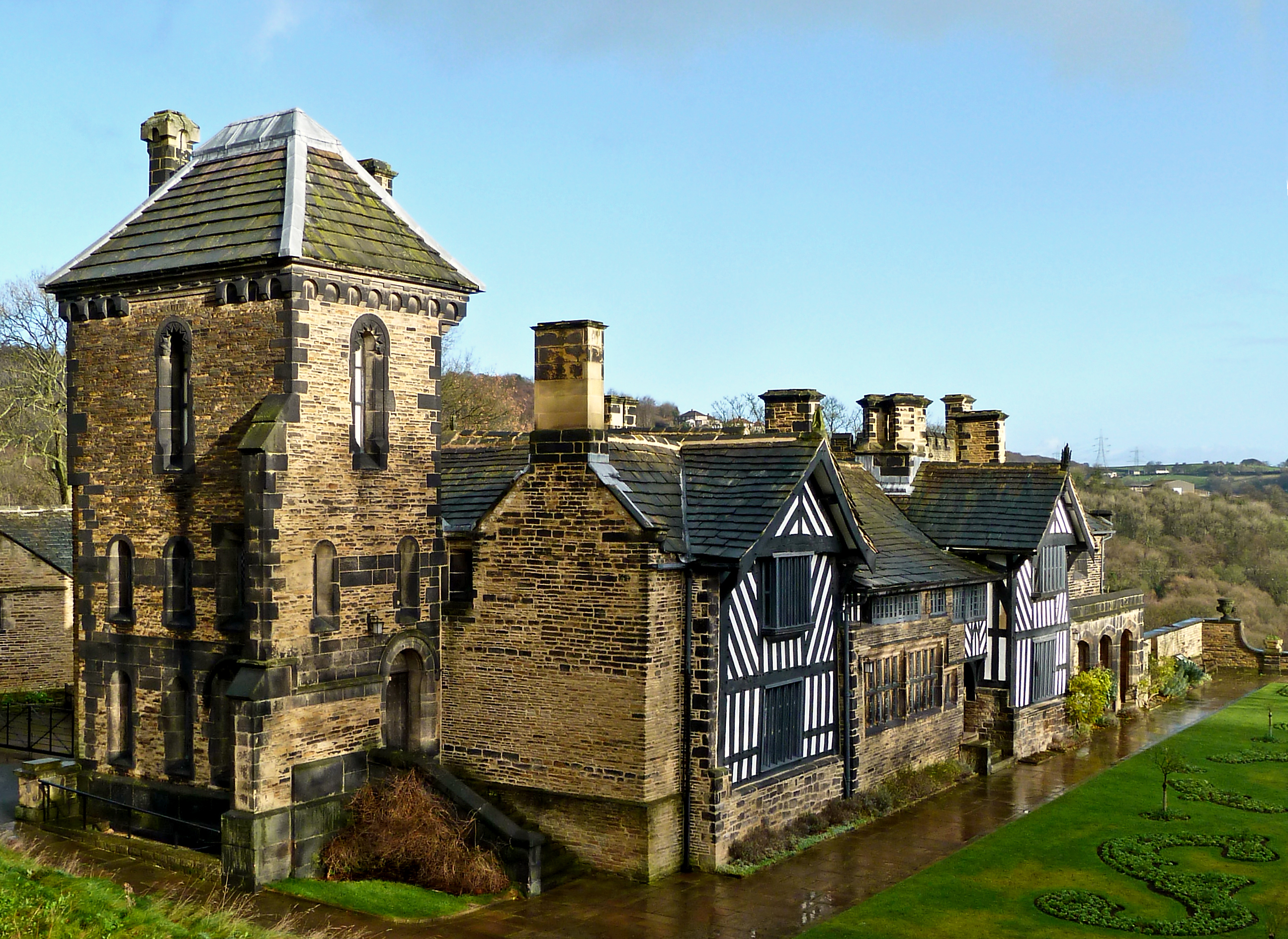
Shibden Hall where Ann Walker lived with Anne Lister during their marriage and after Lister's death

== Faith and philanthropy ==
Walker's Anglican faith was important to her, as were her philanthropic endeavours. She worshipped regularly at St Matthew's Church in Lightcliffe throughout her life, and read prayers and scripture to her family and servants on Sundays. Walker was fond of children and created her own Sunday school. She took great care of her servants and tenants, as is evidenced by letters written back home while she was travelling abroad in 1839–1840, where she lists out the gifts that each of them should be given for Christmas in her absence.

== Mental health ==
Walker struggled with mental health issues throughout her life. She was prone to bouts of anxiety and depression, which appeared in part to be linked to her religious faith. Walker struggled to accept her own sexuality, which put additional strain on her mental health as well as her relationship with Lister. On 1 November 1832, Walker faced a difficult decision to choose to be with Lister or accept a traditional marriage with a man:

Sat by her on the sofa, both of us perpetually with silent tears trickling down our cheeks. She quite undecided, fearing she should not be so happy with him as she might have been. Never knew till now how much she was attached to me ... Torturing herself with all the miseries of not knowing what to do, she said how beautifully I behaved ... She said there was as something in me she liked better than in him. Felt repugnance to forming any connection with the other sex.

In 1843, three years after the death of Lister, with deteriorating mental health and a series of legal troubles, Walker left Shibden Hall and briefly stayed at Terrace House, a private House in Osbaldwick, near York. She was declared to be of 'unsound mind' shortly afterwards. She returned to Shibden Hall in 1845, after living in the London area with her sister and brother-in-law for a while. In 1848, Walker moved back to her family's estate in Lightcliffe after her aunt's death, living at Cliffe Hill until her own death in 1854.

== Death ==
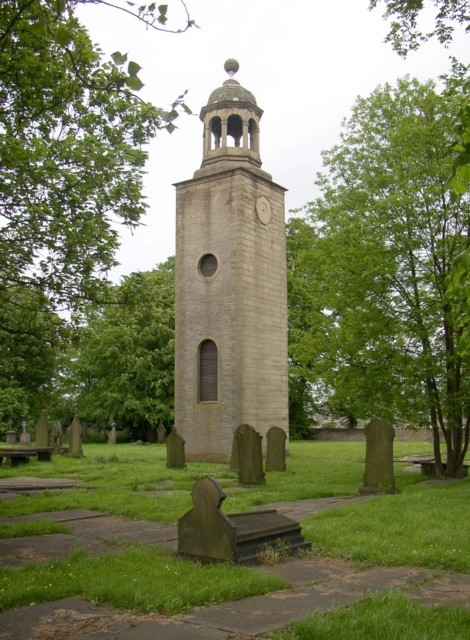
The remaining tower from Old St Matthew's Church, Lightcliffe where Ann Walker's brass memorial plaque hangs (the rest of the church has been demolished)

Walker died on 25 February 1854, aged 50. Her death certificate states her cause of death as "congestion of the brain, effusion". She was buried on 3 March 1854 under the reading pulpit of the Old St Matthew's Church, Lightcliffe. Ann's parents John (d. 22 April 1823) and Mary (d. 3 November 1823) are buried in the Old St Matthew's Churchyard, as well as her siblings William (d. 26 April 1798) and Mary (d. 1 February 1815), her niece Mary Sutherland (d. 16 June 1845), and her aunt Ann Walker (d. 29 October 1847).

The Old St Matthew's Church was demolished by the church authorities in 1974, but the tower was preserved in situ with Ann's original brass memorial plaque conserved for posterity. A special viewing of the memorial plaque took place on Saturday, 14 September 2019, when the tower was opened to the public for the first time since its closure in the 1970s.

Ann's brother John (d. 19 January 1830) died in Naples on his honeymoon, her nephews John Walker Sutherland (d. 1836) and George Sackville Sutherland (d. 1843) died in Scotland, and her sister Elizabeth (d. 1844) died in London.

== Legacy ==
No known portraits of Walker exist, but a few of her letters are held in the West Yorkshire Archives. She kept a journal, of which one volume was discovered on 20 October 2020 among the Rawson Family Collection (WYC:1525/7/1/5/1) by research group 'In Search of Ann Walker'. The journal was verified three days later by the West Yorkshire Archive Service, which holds the collection as well as Anne Lister's diaries. Much of what is known about Walker comes from the journals of Lister, who kept detailed diaries throughout her adult life.

== Popular culture ==
Gentleman Jack is a historical drama television series created by Sally Wainwright, co-produced by HBO and Lookout Point (for the BBC), and starring Suranne Jones as landowner and industrialist Anne Lister and Sophie Rundle as wealthy neighbouring heiress Ann Walker. The series begins in 1832 in Halifax, West Yorkshire and is based on the collected diaries of Lister, which contain over five million words, one-sixth of which are written in code. Series 1 premiered on 22 April 2019 in the United States, and on 19 May 2019 in the United Kingdom. It was renewed for a second series by BBC One on 23 May 2019. Penguin Books published a companion volume to the series Gentleman Jack: The Real Anne Lister by the series' senior consultant, Anne Choma, which includes newly transcribed and decoded entries from Lister's diaries. The drama's end credits acknowledge that it was "inspired by the books Female Fortune and Nature's Domain" by Jill Liddington, who acted as consultant and whose own website summarises Lister's extraordinary life as "dazzling worldly achievements plus unbuttoned lesbian affairs." O'Hooley & Tidow's song "Gentleman Jack" serves as the series' primary theme music.

Walker is portrayed by Christine Bottomley in the 2010 BBC Two biographical drama The Secret Diaries of Miss Anne Lister.

== Sources ==
- Choma, Anne, "Gentleman Jack: The Real Anne Lister". (PenguinRandomhouse, 2019)
- Euler, Catherine, Euler, Catherine A. (1995). Moving Between Worlds: Gender, Class, Politics, Sexuality and Women's Networks in the Diaries of Anne Lister of Shibden Hall, Halifax, Yorkshire, 1830–1840 (phd). University of York. (University of York, 1995)
- Liddington, Jill, Lister, Anne; Liddington, Jill (1998). Female Fortune: Land, Gender and Authority: The Anne Lister Diaries and Other Writings, 1833–36. Rivers Oram Press. ISBN 9781854890894. (Rivers Oram Press, 1998)
- Liddington, Jill, "Nature's Domain: Anne Lister and the Landscape of Desire". (Pennine Pens Press, 2003)
- Whitbread, Helena, Lister, Anne (5 February 2019). The Secret Diaries of Miss Anne Lister. Little, Brown. ISBN 9781844087198. (Virago Press, 2012)
