= Arthur Burrell =

English lecturer, author and historian (1859-1946)

Arthur Burrell (1859-1946) was an educationist, lecturer, author and historian who served as Principal of Borough Road Training College during the period when the seeds of its later excellence in athletics were sown. Among his varied endeavours he promoted the art of storytelling, deciphered the code in Anne Lister’s diaries, and adapted the Authorised Version of the Bible to a shortened form for children.

== Birth and education ==
Born in Middlesex and brought up in Gloucestershire, he was a son of William Burrell, formerly a superintending surgeon in the East India Company’s service at Madras, by his second wife Adelaide Pierce. Educated at Dulwich College, he in 1878 obtained an open scholarship to Wadham College, Oxford, and graduated in 1881, having been placed in the second class of both parts of the Literae humaniores examination.

== Early teaching appointments ==
In 1882 he obtained appointment as an assistant master at Bradford Grammar School, and in 1890 he became Senior Master of its Junior Department. The measure of his success in these roles was recognised in 1899 when, at the initiative of some of Bradford’s most prominent citizens, his departure from the school was marked by a dinner and substantial presentation to him. On this occasion the city’s mayor paid tribute to his having done “more for education in its very highest form - making boys love learning for learning’s own sake - than any of the other men who had ever been a leader in education in the city”. Among his pupils had been Sir William Rothenstein, who later recalled him as an “admirable master” who “won my whole-hearted devotion”.

== Principal at Borough Road ==
He left Bradford on being appointed Principal of Borough Road Training College, a residential establishment preparing men for the teaching profession, in succession to H. L. Withers. Shortly after his appointment the college, which had recently relocated to Isleworth, was refused the status of a constituent school of the University of London notwithstanding that 80 of its 129 students were currently preparing for the university’s degree examinations. The refusal reflected official opinion that the college’s primary focus should be on preparation for elementary teaching, but five years later one in seven of the names on the university’s BA and BSc lists was that of a Borough Road graduate and the Board of Education accepted that higher study at the college was providing much needed intellectual stimulus for students of ability.

Against this background Burrell deplored the Board’s position whereby students failing their degree examination did not qualify for a Teacher’s Certificate despite having passed the professional part of the examination. This was one of several disagreements he had with the Board during a period when scrutiny and regulation of public education made consistent direction of teacher training especially challenging. During Burrell’s twelve years at Borough Road there were three major Consultative Committee reports, three Royal Commissions, several education circulars and Codes of Regulation, as well as the Education Act 1902.

Burrell himself had clear views on the proper content of elementary education, proposing at the British Association’s Annual Conference in 1906 that the curriculum of a primary school should omit a second language, all but elementary mathematics, all definite instruction in chemistry, and all higher grammar, and should make greater provision for physical work, tool work and geographical work.

He was deeply interested in the role of athletic exercise in the development of children and made engaging in physical training intrinsic to the culture of Borough Road. In 1905 he reported “We shall not do our duty by students (who, for the most part, come up physically untrained) until we see every single member of the College taking daily exercise. We are on the high road to this”. He was assisted in establishing this regime by Herbert Milnes, a tutor at the college and sportsman of some note who carried the cult of athleticism to Auckland Teachers' Training College, of which he became head in 1906. Milnes was one of five principals supplied by Borough Road to training colleges in different parts of the world during Burrell’s term there.

Burrell resigned from Borough Road in 1912 in order, it was said, “to do missionary work to revive the art of story-telling”.

== Storytelling and the human voice ==
=== Early work ===
He believed the decline of oral storytelling following invention of the printing press substantially deprived society of an art-form that had, for thousands of years, engaged and developed both the intellect and the voice of mankind. In parallel with this belief he considered that reading aloud was the best way to understand, appreciate and interpret the meaning of the written word, and that accordingly the human voice should receive the fullest education.

In the 1880s he gave public readings of poems and stories by authors who were currently popular and he began making a personal collection of stories, particularly of those that had circulated in different parts of the world from before the era of the written word. In the following decade he lectured widely on nursery rhymes, fairy tales and folklore and, in the course of these lectures, performed recitations which were regarded as “of the highest order”.

In 1890 he contributed an article on “Recitation” to the first issue of Charlotte Mason’s monthly The Parent’s Review and his essay “Voices from My Books: Studies in Recitation” appeared in the Atalanta magazine. He had sufficiently developed the topic to produce a teaching handbook on recitation in the following year and in 1898 he published Clear Speaking and Good Reading which ran to several editions over the next two decades. This last treatise proceeded on the same premise as his 1890 article, namely that a child’s voice is naturally beautiful and should be sympathetically guided to become “distinct, quiet and restrained” rather than forced into shape by elocutionary pressure. To such end he advocated breathing exercises, practice in accurate sounding, and encouragement of children to recount familiar stories in their own words rather than by slavishly repeating established texts.

=== Later work ===
For three decades, commencing in the early 1900s, he frequently lectured on “The Art of Story Telling” to literary and philosophical societies, religious and charitable bodies, and groups such as the Parents' National Educational Union, the Froebel Society, the National Union of Teachers and the Workers’ Educational Association. When addressing those engaged in teaching his focus was on the use of storytelling as an educational medium by which to “appeal to wonder, imagination, intelligence, laughter and tears”. Presenting his subject to more general audiences he compared what he considered the “real divorce between literature and the human mind” with the inherent appeal of stories from different lands and traditions that acted as “one of the great unifiers of mankind”.

In the course of his lectures Burrell would tell several stories from his considerable collection and then trace their origins and analyse their appeal and significance. Stories for young or old were selected according to the composition of his audience and, when intended for children, were often illustrated by lantern slides of pictures drawn by his brother. When he lectured at Bradford in 1904 the illustrations were supplied by Alice Goyder.

He also explained the technique of successful storytelling, insisting that the teller must submerge his personality in favour of the story, that there must be “no affectation, no tragic or stage effects”, and that the teller’s only gestures must be those that come naturally “in the poise of the head and body and the play of the hands and eyes”. His own telling attracted what seems to have been general admiration, reportedly receiving “riveted attention” and, upon conclusion, “tumultuous” or “rapturous” applause, and he was said to be “well-known throughout the British Isles as an expert of his art” who told his stories with “the charm of a supreme story-teller”.

In 1924 the BBC broadcast Burrell telling children’s stories and in 1926 his book A Guide to Story Telling appeared in print. More than thirty years earlier he had published a small collection of stories (interspersed with verses) of his own composition, The Man with Seven Hearts, and this he followed shortly afterwards with a similar selection, The Piebald Horse and Other Stories.

== Editorial work ==
Between 1908 and 1912 he contributed three books to J. M. Dent’s Everyman's Library series. First among these (no. 307 in the series) was Chaucer’s Canterbury Tales for the Modern Reader, in which he modernised Chaucer’s spelling and vocabulary “just enough to leave its quaintness and take away some of the difficulties”. This was followed by Piers Plowman, The Vision of a People’s Christ: A Version for the Modern Reader (no. 571), a modernisation of the original text in the same manner, and by A Book of Heroic Verse chosen by Arthur Burrell, M.A. (no. 574).

This last, comprising a selection of some 150 verses dating from Biblical times to the contemporary age of Conan Doyle and Henry Newbolt, had first appeared in 1905 in Dent’s series of Temple Classics for school reading when Burrell’s Selections from Shakespeare, with explanatory notes, was also among the series.

For Dent he undertook to adapt and edit the Authorised Version of the Bible to a form and length specifically intended for use in schools and home study. The version he produced, published in 1909 under the title The Shorter Bible, was notable for its carefully considered omissions (including the whole of Leviticus, Chronicles, Mark’s Gospel and the Epistle to the Philippians). Less than 700 printed pages in length, It was generally well received but did not pass into widespread use and was later somewhat eclipsed by the Cambridge Shorter Bible edited by Alexander Nairne, T. R. Glover and Arthur Quiller-Couch. Nevertheless, it continued to be reprinted as late as 1940.

Burrell himself was regarded as an authority on the history of the English Bible and its translation and his private library included early Tyndale, Coverdale and Geneva Bibles.

== Anne Lister’s diaries ==
When living in Bradford, he became a friend of John Lister who, following inheritance of Shibden Hall, had found there the diaries of his late relative Anne Lister. One-sixth of the content of these was written in cipher employing Greek characters and algebraic symbols. Burrell lectured on Classical topics and it was possibly on account of his familiarity with Greek text that Lister sought his assistance to decode the cipher. Having borrowed and studied a volume of the diaries, Burrell believed he had established how the letters ‘h’ and ‘e’ were rendered in their code. When he and Lister found a scrap of paper on which Anne had written in cipher the word that completed “God is my…”, the rendition of two further letters was exposed and her code was essentially broken, revealing her lesbian seductions and affairs.

Burrell considered the matters thus disclosed “very unsavoury” and involving “criminal” conduct. He urged John Lister to destroy the diaries but Lister preserved them and, following his death in 1933, they came into the possession of Halifax Borough Corporation. In 1937 Burrell provided the Borough’s librarian (“as you are the legal owner of the manuscript”) with his key to the cipher; two decades later the key was first disclosed to researchers and after a further thirty years the secrets of the diaries were published and attracted worldwide attention.

== Local historian ==
Following his retirement from Borough Road, Burrell lived in Twickenham where he was chairman of the local Library Committee for twenty years. He researched the history of the district extensively and in 1938 presented the borough with what was described as “The Book of Twickenham” summarising and illustrating the results of his research. In recognition of his “eminent services” to the borough he had been made an honorary freeman of Twickenham in the previous year.

Following his death the borough established an annual Arthur Burrell Memorial Lecture. In 1965 the fifteenth such lecture was given by Sir John Rothenstein, son of Burrell’s old pupil, and the twenty-ninth lecture was delivered in 1979.

== Death ==
Burrell died on 18 September 1946, aged 87. He remained unmarried and from the time of his appointment to Borough Road his spinster sister Alice (who survived him) presided over his household affairs and helped him in his research.
