= The Secret Diaries of Miss Anne Lister =

2010 film by James Kent

- Screenplay by: Jane English
- Directed by: James Kent
- Starring: Maxine Peake; Anna Madeley; Christine Bottomley
- Theme music composer: Avshalom Caspi
- Country of origin: United Kingdom
- Original language: English

Production
- Producer: Mark Bentley
- Cinematography: Lukas Strebel
- Editor: Ben Lester
- Running time: 90 minutes
- Production company: The Oxford Film Company

Original release
- Network: BBC Two
- Release: 31 May 2010

The Secret Diaries of Miss Anne Lister is a 2010 British biographical historical drama film about 19th-century Yorkshire landowner Anne Lister. Made for television, the film was directed by James Kent and starred Maxine Peake as Lister. The script by Jane English drew from Lister's diaries, written in code, and decoded many years after her death. The story follows Lister's lesbian relationships and her independent lifestyle as an industrialist. The Secret Diaries of Miss Anne Lister held its world premiere screening at the London Lesbian and Gay Film Festival in March 2010 and was broadcast in the United Kingdom by the BBC in May 2010.

== Plot ==
Anne Lister (Maxine Peake) is a young unmarried woman living in 19th-century Yorkshire, at Shibden Hall, with her aunt (Gemma Jones) and uncle (Alan David). The one thing she wants from life is to have someone to love and to share her life with. The person she has in mind is Mariana Belcombe (Anna Madeley), with whom she has been conducting a secret romantic and sexual relationship.

The relationship breaks apart when Mariana marries a rich widower named Charles Lawton (Michael Culkin). Depressed, Anne devotes her time to studying. A year after Mariana's wedding, Anne begins to think about finding another lover. She meets a young woman in church named Miss Browne (Tina O'Brien), and they become close friends.

Mariana asks Anne to meet her in a hotel in Manchester. There, the two women talk and Mariana tells Anne that she has missed her, and that one day, when her husband has died, they might live together as widow and companion. She says that her husband is not healthy, and will not have long to live. Anne agrees and they buy wedding rings, to wear around their necks until they can live together. Returning to Shibden, Anne ignores the attention of Miss Browne.

A local industrialist named Christopher Rawson (Dean Lennox Kelly) proposes marriage to Anne. She turns him down and says that she could only marry for love. He tells her that people talk about her and call her 'Gentleman Jack.' Later, Anne tells her aunt and uncle that she does not want a husband, that she wants to be independent and intends one day to live with a female companion. Mariana visits her on her birthday and they continue their sexual relationship.

Anne attends a party with her acquaintances, including Rawson and the Lawtons. Mariana sees Anne wearing her wedding ring clearly on show and is unhappy with Anne drawing attention to herself. Anne complains that Charles Lawton is not as unhealthy as Mariana had led her to believe. Rawson sees the two women talking together and has a conversation of his own with Lawton. When Mariana returns to her husband's side, he looks dazed and asks her how Anne loves her. After the party, Mariana writes to Anne and tells her that her husband is suspicious. She tells Anne not to write to her anymore.

Anne's uncle dies and she inherits his wealth. She writes to Mariana, asking her to come to live with her at once. Mariana replies that she will be travelling nearby in a month's time and that they will discuss what to do then. When the time comes, Anne meets Mariana's coach coming along the road and excitedly gets in. Mariana is angry at her drawing attention to herself. She tells Anne that she would rather die than have people know about their relationship. She says that they could be happy together, but would have to live apart. Anne tells her that she wants to spend her life with someone, and leaves.

When Rawson offers to buy some land from Anne to sink a mine, she declines and says that she will mine it herself. She forms a business alliance with Ann Walker (Christine Bottomley), an unmarried acquaintance who has recently inherited her own fortune. They become close friends. Soon the two women are intimidated and harassed by Rawson, now their business rival. For protection, Ann Walker goes to stay at Shibden with Anne.

Ann’s aunt (Richenda Carey) comes to Shibden to tell her niece that people are spreading shocking rumours about the two women. She asks Ann to return home before she ruins the Walker family name and warns her that she may ruin her chance of finding a husband. Ann tells her aunt that she does not want a husband. When her aunt leaves, Ann tells Anne that she wants to live at Shibden with her. Anne asks her if she understands what the rumours and insinuations are about. Ann says that she does and makes it clear that she wants them to be together romantically.

Mariana visits Anne and says that she could leave Charles now. She asks if there is still a place for her in Anne's heart, but Anne says that she has found someone she is happy with now, and Mariana leaves. Afterwards, Anne is seen planting flowers in the greenhouse with Ann. In the credits, we learn that Anne Lister died at the age of 49 while travelling with Ann Walker in the Caucasus Mountains.

== Cast ==
- Maxine Peake as Anne Lister
- Anna Madeley as Mariana
- Susan Lynch as Isabella ('Tib') Norcliffe
- Christine Bottomley as Ann Walker
- Gemma Jones as Aunt Lister
- Alan David as Uncle Lister
- Richenda Carey as Mrs. Priestley
- Michael Culkin as Charles Lawton
- Dean Lennox Kelly as Christopher Rawson

== Background and production ==
Anne Lister was a wealthy, unmarried woman who inherited Shibden Hall in West Yorkshire from her uncle in 1826. Throughout her life, she kept diaries which chronicled the details of her everyday life, including her lesbian relationships, her financial concerns, her industrial activities and her work improving Shibden Hall. The diaries contain more than 4,000,000 words and about a sixth of them (those concerning the intimate details of her romantic and sexual relationships) were written in code. The code, derived from a combination of algebra and Ancient Greek, was deciphered in the 1930s.

The script for The Secret Diaries of Miss Anne Lister was written by Jane English and the film was directed by James Kent. Maxine Peake, who had not previously heard of Lister, was keen to take part in a production with several strong female characters. She said of her role, "[I]t was a privilege – I panicked about playing her at first because she is such an important figure and because she is very much part of lesbian and gay culture and you want to do a good job." She spent time with Lister expert Helena Whitbread, learning more about Lister's personality. For this part Peake was able to work with Dean Lennox Kelly, her former on-screen partner from Shameless.

Location shooting took place during November and December 2009 in various locations in Yorkshire; including Shibden Hall, Newburgh Priory, Bramham Park, Oakwell Hall, the North York Moors and the city of York.

== Release ==
The film premièred at the 24th London Lesbian and Gay Film Festival on 17 March 2010. It was broadcast in the United Kingdom by BBC Two and BBC HD on 31 May 2010. It played at the opening night of San Francisco's Frameline Film Festival on 17 June 2010 and was broadcast in Australia by ABC1 on 13 November 2011.

== Reception ==
In its BBC broadcast, The Secret Diaries of Miss Anne Lister drew 1.878 million viewers (7.8%) and 50,000 more, simultaneously, on BBC HD. Critics gave a mixed response to the drama.

The Daily Telegraph's John Preston was positive about the film and particularly praised Maxine Peake's acting. He said, "Peake is an extraordinary actress – both intensely human in her vulnerability and intensely disquieting [...] veering between predatory seductiveness and agonised self-pity." For The Scotsman, Andrea Mullaney gave a mixed review. She praised Peake's "excellent" and "fiery" performance and said that she "played [Lister] with great energy, her small, alert face full of expression and emotion". She said, though, that the story "should have been more gripping than it was" but that the script "wobbled around" and was too lengthy.

Writing for Metro, Keith Watson called the film "mesmerising and liberating". He praised Peake's performance and enjoyed the contrast between her scenes of "pushing politeness to its limits" and "snatching carnal ecstasy". In a review of British television programmes broadcast that week, Euan Ferguson of The Observer called the film the "drama of the week" and said that it "gripped, and haunted, and was beautifully and cleverly played".

Sarah Dempster in The Guardian was unimpressed with the film, criticising the "misery" and "gloom" and said that "Peake's presence in a production is not generally conducive to LOLZ." Rachel Cooke gave a somewhat negative review for the New Statesman, criticising the overemphasis on Lister's sex-life and the parts of her life missing from the script. She said that the story would not have received any attention if not for the lesbianism of the main character. She said that Peake, "a wonderful actor", was "especially weird" and her characterisation of Lister was "rapacious and cocky, petulant and manipulative". She praised Susan Lynch, playing Lister's friend Tib, as "excellent". Overall, she said the film was "sex-obsessed, reductionist stuff".

== See also ==
- Gentleman Jack – BBC One/HBO television series about Anne Lister (2019)
