= Jill Liddington =

British writer and academic (born 1946)

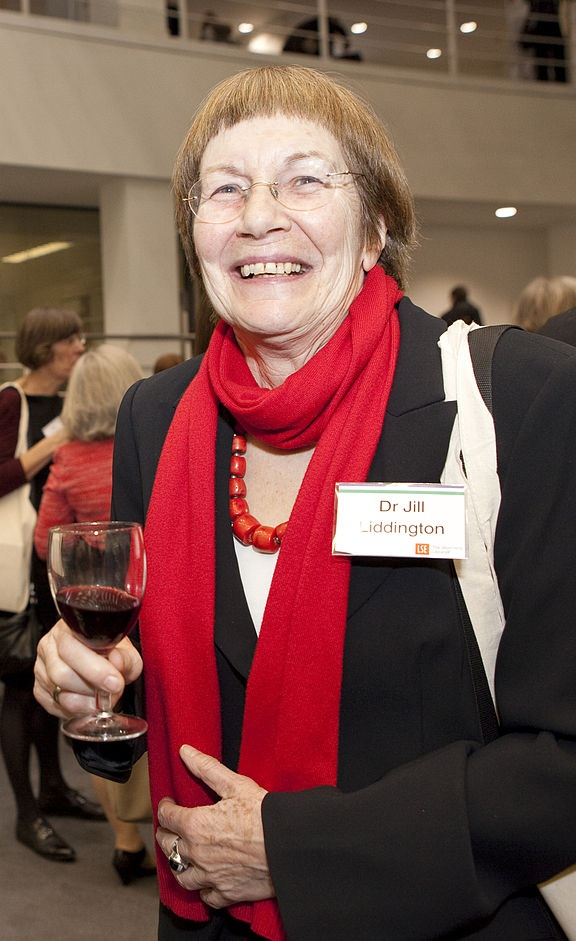
- Liddington at LSE Library in 2014
- Born: 1946 (age 78–79); Manchester, England
- Occupation(s): Writer and academic
- Notable work: Long Road to Greenham (1989)
- Awards: Fawcett Book Prize

Jill Liddington (born in Manchester, 1946) is a British writer and academic who specialises in women's history.

== Life ==
In 1974, she returned to Manchester and worked in the media before becoming a teacher in adult education. She joined the Department of External Studies at Leeds University in 1982 and became a Reader in Gender History, School of Continuing Education, until her transfer to the Centre for Interdisciplinary Gender Studies, where she is currently Honorary Research Fellow.

Liddington's book Long Road to Greenham won the Fawcett Society Book Prize in 1990. Her Rebel Girls was shortlisted for the Portico Book Prize, 2008.

Liddington stood as a Labour Party candidate in the Sowerby Bridge ward in the Calderdale Council election, 2004 – largely to prevent more BNP councillors being elected.

Liddington's book Female Fortune: Land, Gender and Authority was chosen by feminist and TV writer Sally Wainwright as the book she would want with her to read if she was ever trapped on a desert island. Wainwright subsequently developed a historical TV drama series, Gentleman Jack, as a BBC-HBO production which aired in spring 2019 and depicts the life of Victorian landowner Anne Lister, as “the first modern lesbian”. The end credits acknowledge that the drama was "inspired by the books Female Fortune and Nature’s Domain by Jill Liddington", whose own website declares: “Ever since her death in 1840, Anne Lister of Shibden Hall has exerted a magnetic attraction... The most powerful magnet remains her daily diaries. These run to no fewer than four million words, much of it written in her own secret code. Anne Lister's code was not cracked till fifty years after her death. I remained hooked by Anne’s extraordinary life: dazzling worldly achievements plus unbuttoned lesbian affairs.”

== Publications ==
- 1978: One Hand Tied Behind Us: the rise of the women's suffrage movement (with Jill Norris), Virago Press, ISBN 978-1854891105.
- 1989: The Long Road to Greenham: feminism and anti-militarism in Britain since 1820, Virago Press.
- 1994: Presenting the Past: Anne Lister of Halifax 1791-1840, Pennine Pens.
- 1998: Female Fortune: Land, Gender and Authority: the Anne Lister diaries 1833–36, Rivers Oram Press.
- 2006: Rebel Girls: their fight for the vote, Virago Press.
- 2014: Vanishing for the Vote: suffrage, citizenship and the battle for the census; with Gazetteer of campaigners compiled by Elizabeth Crawford and Jill Liddington. Manchester University Press, ISBN 9781847798947 (ebook).

== See also ==
- Women's suffrage in the United Kingdom
- Women's suffrage
- History of feminism
