= Gentleman Jack (TV series) =

British historical television drama series (2019, 2022)

- Genre: Historical drama
- Created by: Sally Wainwright
- Written by: Sally Wainwright
- Starring: Suranne Jones; Sophie Rundle
- Theme music composer: Murray Gold
- Ending theme: "Gentleman Jack" by O'Hooley & Tidow
- Composer: Murray Gold
- Countries of origin: United Kingdom; United States
- Original languages: English; French
- No. of series: 2
- No. of episodes: 16

Production
- Executive producers: Sally Wainwright; Faith Penhale; Laura Lankester; Ben Irving; Suranne Jones; Will Johnston
- Producers: Phil Collinson; Stella Merz
- Production location: United Kingdom
- Cinematography: Johann Perry; Matt Gray; Nick Dance; Nicola Daley; Simon Chapman
- Editors: David Rees; Mark Elliott; Richard Cox; Ulrike Münch
- Camera setup: Arri Alexa Mini; Cooke Anamorphic/i; S2/S3 Panchro
- Running time: 58-71 minutes
- Production company: Lookout Point TV

Original release
- Network: BBC One (United Kingdom); HBO (United States)
- Release: 22 April 2019 – 13 June 2022

Gentleman Jack is a British historical drama television series created by Sally Wainwright for BBC One and HBO. (Note: Gentleman Jack: The Life and Times of Anne Lister – The Official Companion to the BBC Series was published in 2019 alongside the programme.) Set in the 1830s in Yorkshire, it stars Suranne Jones as landowner and industrialist Anne Lister, and Sophie Rundle as landowner Ann Walker. The series is based on Lister's collected diaries—which run to an estimated 5 million words with about a sixth in secret code,—documenting a lifetime of sapphic relationships. Helena Whitbread began decoding and transcribing the diaries in the 1980s. Other transcribers have carried on the work. The research carried out for Wainwright's Gentleman Jack amounts to hundreds of thousands of words of new transcription of the diary.

The series premiered on 22 April 2019 in the United States, and on 19 May 2019 in the United Kingdom. On 23 May 2019, It was renewed for a second series, which was shown on BBC One from 10 April to 29 May 2022 and on HBO from 25 April to 13 June 2022. In July 2022, co-production company HBO said it would not proceed with a third series. In July 2022, the BBC announced that they wanted to continue with the programme, but they need to find a production partner to replace HBO.

== Plot ==
In 1832, Miss Anne Lister leaves Hastings brokenhearted and returns to the Shibden Hall estate she has inherited from her uncle in the lush landscape of Halifax, West Yorkshire, England. While restoring the estate she discovers that her neighbours, the Rawson brothers, are stealing coal from the beds beneath her land and embarks on a plan to reopen the estate's own long-closed mine. At the same time this unusual lady landowner starts to develop a potentially dangerous romance with Miss Ann Walker, wealthy owner of Crow Nest estate, all of which Lister records in a cryptic diary.

== Cast ==
=== Main ===
- Suranne Jones as Anne Lister
- Sophie Rundle as Ann Walker, Anne Lister's fiancée and eventual wife.
- Joe Armstrong as Samuel Washington, land steward for both Ann Walker and Anne Lister
- Amelia Bullmore as Eliza Priestley, wife of William Priestley
- Rosie Cavaliero as Elizabeth Cordingley, cook-housekeeper for the Listers and former lady's maid to Anne Lister
- Gemma Whelan as Marian Lister, Anne Lister's sister
- Gemma Jones as Aunt Anne Lister
- Timothy West as Capt. Jeremy Lister, Anne Lister's father
- Tom Lewis as Thomas Sowden, one of Anne Lister's tenants

=== Recurring ===
- Stephanie Cole as Aunt Ann Walker
- George Costigan as James Holt, who works for Anne Lister and helps with managing her coal business
- Peter Davison as William Priestley, Ann Walker's cousin and one of the trustees of her entailed estate
- Shaun Dooley as Jeremiah Rawson, Ann Walker's cousin and Christopher Rawson's brother
- Vincent Franklin as Christopher Rawson, a magistrate and Ann Walker's cousin
- Lydia Leonard as Mariana Lawton, Anne Lister's ex-lover with whom she occasionally sleeps
- Katherine Kelly as Elizabeth Sutherland, Ann Walker's sister who lives in Scotland with her husband and children
- Derek Riddell as Elizabeth's husband, Captain Sutherland
- Lucy Black as Mary Sowden, Thomas Sowden's mother
- Amy James-Kelly as Suzannah Washington, eldest daughter of Samuel Washington
- Thomas Howes as John Booth, head gardener for the Listers
- Albane Courtois as Eugénie Pierre, Anne Lister's femme de chambre or French lady's maid
- Ben Hunter as Joseph (George) Booth, the Listers' manservant and brother of John Booth
- Jessica Baglow as Rachel Hemingway, lady's maid to Aunt Anne and Marian Lister
- Bruce Alexander as Mr. Parker, Anne Lister's financial adviser
- Leo Flanagan as Matthew Avison, the Listers' footman (S2)
- Daniel Weyman as Dr Kenny, the local doctor for Ann Walker, Aunt Anne Lister, Capt. Jeremy Lister and Henry Hardcastle
- John Hollingworth as Mr Abbott, Marian Lister's suitor
- Saul Marron as James Mackenzie, Ann Walker's manservant
- Emma Paetz (S1) and Elizabeth Dulau (S2) as Catherine Rawson, Ann Walker's cousin
- Lucy Briers as Mrs Stansfield Rawson, Catherine and Delia Rawson's mother
- Emma Wrightson as Eliza Washington, Samuel Washington's second oldest daughter
- Joel Morris as William Hardcastle, Anne Lister's tenant
- Natalie Gavin as Alice Hardcastle, William Hardcastle's wife
- Dexter Hughes as Henry Hardcastle, William and Alice's son, who loses his leg in a carriage accident
- Deerhound Rhodry as Argus

=== Guest ===
- Anthony Flanagan as Samuel Sowden, Thomas Sowden's alcoholic and violent father, and as Ben Sowden, Samuel Sowden's brother and Thomas's uncle
- Rupert Vansittart as Charles Lawton, Mariana Lawton's husband
- Sylvia Syms (S1) and Sara Kestelman (S2) as Mrs Rawson (Elderly Mrs Rawson in S2), mother of Christopher Rawson and Jeremiah Rawson
- Brendan Patricks as Reverend Thomas Ainsworth, a man who raped Ann Walker and later proposes to her
- Jodhi May as Vere Hobart, later Lady Vere Cameron, Anne Lister's former travelling companion and unrequited love
- Daisy Edgar-Jones (S1) and Poppy Allen-Quarmby (S2) as Delia Rawson, Mrs Stansfield Rawson's daughter and Ann Walker's cousin
- Sofie Gråbøl as Queen Marie of Denmark
- Stephanie Hyam as Sophie Ferrall
- Julie Agnete Vang as Countess (Emily) Blücher, Sophie's elder sister
- Joanna Scanlan as Anne Lister's former lover, Isabella "Tib" Norcliffe
- Luke Newberry as architect Jack Harper, A depiction of the real architectural changes to Shibden Hall in 1837
- Nicholas Farrell as John Waterhouse Snr, chairman of the Navigation Committee
- Hannah Donelon as Mary Rawson, Ann Walker's cousin
- Matilda Holt as Martha Booth, John Booth's daughter and later Mariana Lawton's kitchen hand

== Episodes ==
Series	Episodes	Originally released	
Series	Episodes	First released	Last released
1	8	22 April 2019	10 June 2019
2	8	10 April 2022	29 May 2022

=== Series 1 (2019) ===
No. overall	No. in series	Title	Directed by	Written by	Original release date	Viewers (millions)
1	1	"I Was Just Passing"	Sally Wainwright	Sally Wainwright	22 April 2019 (US)	0.441 (US)
1	1	"I Was Just Passing"	Sally Wainwright	Sally Wainwright	19 May 2019 (UK)	6.70 (UK)
In 1832, worldly Anne Lister returns to Halifax in Yorkshire after her former lover, Vere Hobart, leaves her to marry a man. Taking over the management of her family's ancestral home Shibden Hall, Lister discovers that not only has the estate been neglected and the rents uncollected, but there is considerable coal on the property that could be mined at great profit. A chance meeting introduces her to the shy but wealthy heiress Ann Walker, who lives nearby.
2	2	"I Just Went There To Study Anatomy"	Sally Wainwright	Sally Wainwright	29 April 2019 (US)	0.437 (US)
2	2	"I Just Went There To Study Anatomy"	Sally Wainwright	Sally Wainwright	26 May 2019 (UK)	5.88 (UK)
Anne Lister begins a dangerous venture of courting Ann Walker. Meanwhile, Lister continues to fight the Rawson brothers for coal and enlists the help of Mr. Washington to claim her money. After learning that Eugénie, Anne Lister's new lady's maid, is unexpectedly pregnant, John Booth decides to assist her in concealing her secret. After attending the wedding of Vere Hobart, Anne Lister feels closure and begins her pursuit of Ann Walker to the Lake District.
3	3	"Oh Is That What You Call It?"	Sarah Harding	Sally Wainwright	6 May 2019 (US)	0.338 (US)
3	3	"Oh Is That What You Call It?"	Sarah Harding	Sally Wainwright	2 June 2019 (UK)	5.70 (UK)
Anne and Miss Walker's relationship begins to become intimate. Anne proposes a future with Miss Walker of them living together as a married couple. Miss Walker responds by saying they should wait six months before committing. The Rawson brothers try to outmanoeuvre Anne in the coal business by making a low offer. Mr. Booth proposes marriage to Eugénie to protect her honour. Feeling powerless, Marian threatens her sister by saying she will marry a man to bear a male heir and challenge the ownership of Shibden. When Anne realises that Sam Sowden, one of her tenants who is working with her on the coal mine, arrived to work drunk she dismisses him. Sowden's drunken threats force his son Thomas to take him home and tie him up. Later on, Thomas kills him and feeds him to the family pigs.
4	4	"Most Women Are Dull and Stupid"	Sarah Harding	Sally Wainwright	13 May 2019 (US)	0.427 (US)
4	4	"Most Women Are Dull and Stupid"	Sarah Harding	Sally Wainwright	9 June 2019 (UK)	5.94 (UK)
Mrs. Priestly develops grave concerns over Ann's newfound love with Anne Lister. After news of Mrs. Ainsworth's death, Ann suffers a bereavement as her secret begins to unravel. Anne continues to deal with the Rawson brothers in a fight to reclaim what they have stolen. After a proposal of an engagement from the newly widowed Reverend Ainsworth, Ann must make a decision. Eugénie suffers a miscarriage and calls off her engagement with John Booth, much to his dismay. Thomas fears for his tenancy and feigns ignorance with his family and others regarding his father's death.
5	5	"Let's Have Another Look at Your Past Perfect"	Jennifer Perrott	Sally Wainwright	20 May 2019 (US)	0.362 (US)
5	5	"Let's Have Another Look at Your Past Perfect"	Jennifer Perrott	Sally Wainwright	16 June 2019 (UK)	5.59 (UK)
Reverend Thomas Ainsworth travels to Halifax and sets his sights on Ann Walker. Hearing of Ainsworth's arrival, Miss Lister sets out to deal with him in her own way. While Anne Lister proposes marriage to Miss Walker, Mrs Priestley spreads vicious statements to Miss Parkhill about Anne Lister's character and her being a lesbian, which ultimately leads to Ann Walker's detriment. Thomas Sowden's mother comes to the realisation of Sam Sowden's mysterious disappearance. Ann Walker fights and struggles to reconcile her desire for Anne Lister with the mix of her family's expectations and her faith eventually leading to Ann vociferously shunning Anne. In an attempt to keep Lister away from Walker to stop her from taking Ann's money to sink her coal-pits, Christopher Rawson sends a thug to beat up and intimidate Anne.
6	6	"Do Ladies Do That?"	Jennifer Perrott	Sally Wainwright	27 May 2019 (US)	0.499 (US)
6	6	"Do Ladies Do That?"	Jennifer Perrott	Sally Wainwright	23 June 2019 (UK)	5.82 (UK)
Anne returns to Shibden after having been beaten and laments over her loss of Ann. Thomas Sowden begins his own courtship over Suzannah Washington despite class restraints. Ann Walker's mental state takes a turn for the worse as she struggles to reconcile her homosexuality with her religious beliefs. Anne struggles with her desire to help Ann while balancing her coal ventures. John Abbott is twice invited to tea at Shibden, but Anne refuses to meet him each time, much to Marian's chagrin. Anne writes to Ann's sister and husband in Scotland, who decide that Ann should stay with them. Anne implores Ann to stay with them to recuperate. Before Ann departs, she once again refuses Anne's marriage proposal.
7	7	"Why've You Brought That?"	Sally Wainwright	Sally Wainwright	3 June 2019 (US)	0.270 (US)
7	7	"Why've You Brought That?"	Sally Wainwright	Sally Wainwright	30 June 2019 (UK)	5.45 (UK)
Thomas Sowden visits Suzannah's father and asks for her hand in marriage. Anne confronts Christopher Rawson over his disrespectful treatment of Marian. Offering the deeds to Shibden Estate as collateral, Anne takes out a loan to finance the sinking of a new coal pit. Her former lover Marianna Lawton joins her in London. Heartbroken over Ann Walker's rejection, Anne implores Marianna to leave her husband and come to live with her at Shibden. Miserable and alone, Anne continues her journey to Paris. Meanwhile, Ann Walker's mental health deteriorates further while staying in Scotland with her relatives, and she deeply gashes her hand from shattering a glass.
8	8	"Are You Still Talking?"	Sally Wainwright	Sally Wainwright	10 June 2019 (US)	0.365 (US)
8	8	"Are You Still Talking?"	Sally Wainwright	Sally Wainwright	7 July 2019 (UK)	6.14 (UK)
The sinking of the coal pit runs into unexpected financial problems, putting ownership of Shibden Hall at risk. While Anne is enjoying herself in Copenhagen and socialising with the royal court, she is summoned home after receiving a letter that her Aunt Anne may die of gangrene. Meanwhile, Ann Walker leaves Scotland, much to the chagrin of Captain Sutherland. Ann Walker meets with Anne Lister, and says that she is ready to marry her. Lister takes Walker to the church where they take the sacrament together, and Ann agrees to move into Shibden Hall. Meanwhile, Thomas Sowden marries Suzannah Washington, but his uncle's presence at the wedding reveals to Washington's father that the uncle had not written a letter saying Sam had moved to America.

=== Series 2 (2022) ===
No. overall	No. in series	Title	Directed by	Written by	Original release date	Viewers (millions)
9	1	"Faith is All"	Edward Hall	Sally Wainwright	10 April 2022 (UK)	4.28
9	1	"Faith is All"	Edward Hall	Sally Wainwright	25 April 2022 (US)	0.025
10	2	"Two Jacks Don't Suit"	Edward Hall	Sally Wainwright	17 April 2022 (UK)	3.38
10	2	"Two Jacks Don't Suit"	Edward Hall	Sally Wainwright	2 May 2022 (US)	0.094
11	3	"Tripe All Over the Place, Presumably"	Edward Hall	Sally Wainwright	24 April 2022 (UK)	3.37
11	3	"Tripe All Over the Place, Presumably"	Edward Hall	Sally Wainwright	9 May 2022 (US)	0.116
12	4	"I'm Not the Other Woman, She Is"	Amanda Brotchie	Sally Wainwright	1 May 2022 (UK)	3.15
12	4	"I'm Not the Other Woman, She Is"	Amanda Brotchie	Sally Wainwright	16 May 2022 (US)	0.093
13	5	"A Lucky and Narrow Escape"	Amanda Brotchie	Sally Wainwright	8 May 2022 (UK)	3.20
13	5	"A Lucky and Narrow Escape"	Amanda Brotchie	Sally Wainwright	23 May 2022 (US)	0.113
14	6	"I Can Be as a Meteor in Your Life"	Fergus O'Brien	Sally Wainwright	15 May 2022 (UK)	3.21
14	6	"I Can Be as a Meteor in Your Life"	Fergus O'Brien	Sally Wainwright	30 May 2022 (US)	0.091
15	7	"What's All That Got to Do with Jesus Though?"	Fergus O'Brien	Sally Wainwright	22 May 2022 (UK)	3.19
15	7	"What's All That Got to Do with Jesus Though?"	Fergus O'Brien	Sally Wainwright	6 June 2022 (US)	0.115
16	8	"It's Not Illegal"	Fergus O'Brien	Sally Wainwright	29 May 2022 (UK)	3.20
16	8	"It's Not Illegal"	Fergus O'Brien	Sally Wainwright	13 June 2022 (US)	0.091

== Background and production ==
In November 2016, screenwriter Sally Wainwright was awarded a £30,000 screenwriting fellowship grant from the charitable organisation the Wellcome Trust, in partnership with Film4 and the British Film Institute. Wainwright disclosed to the media that she was writing a drama series about the landowner, industrialist, and intellectual Anne Lister and would use the grant to further her research. In March 2017, it was announced that BBC One and American network HBO had commissioned the eight-part series, provisionally titled "Shibden Hall", after Lister's ancestral home of the same name. Wainwright was announced as the series' director, and executive producer together with Piers Wenger and Faith Penhale. A native of Yorkshire, Wainwright had grown up in the environs of Shibden Hall and had had ambitions to write a drama based on Anne Lister for over 20 years. She described Lister as "a gift to a dramatist" and "one of the most exuberant, thrilling and brilliant women in British history".

In July 2017, the series was renamed Gentleman Jack and Suranne Jones was announced in the protagonist role of Lister. Wainwright, who had previously worked with Jones in Scott & Bailey and Unforgiven, deemed her capable of embodying the "boldness, subtlety, energy and humour" required to depict Lister. In April 2018, Sophie Rundle joined the production as Ann Walker, Lister's intended spouse.

In November 2018, Katherine Kelly was cast in the role of Ann Walker's sister, Elizabeth Sutherland, Sofie Gråbøl as Queen Marie of Denmark and Tom Lewis as Thomas Sowden.

HBO cancelled the programme on 7 July 2022, after two series.

=== Music ===
The theme music was composed by Murray Gold. The series' ending theme song is "Gentleman Jack", written and performed by Yorkshire folk music duo O'Hooley & Tidow and first released in 2012.

=== Filming ===
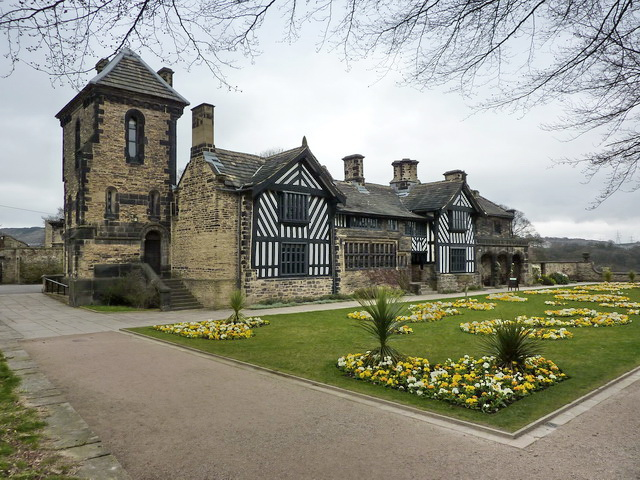
Shibden Hall, the historical home of Anne Lister, was one of the filming locations

Location shooting took place in Yorkshire and surrounding areas, including Shibden Hall as Anne Lister's home and Sutton Park, Yorkshire as Ann Walker's home.

The final scenes of series one were shot in Goodramgate and Precentor's Court in York. Three other locations in York – Duncombe Place, Minster Yard and Holy Trinity Church – were used earlier in the series.

Production on series two, delayed due to the COVID-19 pandemic, resumed in October 2020. It then shut down again and resumed filming in the summer of 2021. Suranne Jones confirmed that filming for the second series had concluded on 4 October 2021. Scenes in episode six were filmed at one of the historic mines in the Shibden Valley, near the Bare Head Tunnel.

== Release ==
BBC One released a teaser trailer for series one on 8 March 2019, followed by the first official trailer on 18 March 2019. The first trailer from HBO was also released on 18 March 2019.

=== Broadcast ===
Gentleman Jack premiered first in the US on 22 April 2019; followed by the UK premiere on 19 May 2019. The first series premiered in Australia on Fox Showcase on 19 May 2019.

== Reception ==
The Hollywood Reporter described Gentleman Jack as a "funny, smart, and touching story" which at times has the main character talk to the camera to explain her inner thoughts, allowing aspects of Lister's diary to be used. The Guardian's review said "Suranne Jones rocks Halifax as the first modern lesbian...Anne Lister's diary [becomes] a thrilling coal-town romp that flirts with parody, so maybe it's Queer Brontë." Variety pointed up the drama's uniqueness: "Wainwright makes an intriguing choice that sets up a decidedly adult romance about devotion, trust and partnership that is rare for TV in general, let alone for lesbian characters in a period piece."

The second season also received critical acclaim. On Rotten Tomatoes, it has a rating of 95%, based on 21 critic reviews, with an average rating of 8.1/10. The site's consensus reads, "Blessed with Suranne Jones' exquisite performance and some of the crispest dialogue on television, Gentleman Jack remains a total ace." The Guardian gave a 5 out of 5 star review for season 2, writing: "It is a masterpiece... One of the greatest British period dramas of our time … Suranne Jones is an alchemical force of nature in the gleeful, radical return of this rollicking, romantic and exquisitely scripted show." Radio Times wrote of season 2: "The show has lost none of its brilliance, nor has Wainwright dislodged its heart and soul – she has only added to it. Gentleman Jack remains a bold and transgressive figure not just for a period drama, but mainstream TV in general, and season 2 another emotional ride."

At the time of cancellation, it was noted that the second season registered amongst HBO's lowest-rated current original series by net viewership. Nonetheless, reports surfaced that the BBC may pursue production of a third season without HBO following the BBC's statement: "We are tremendously proud of Gentleman Jack, a show which has made a huge cultural impact, and we are in discussions with Sally about what's next." As of 2024, there have been no official announcements regarding the show's future.

After it was known that the programme would be discontinued after the second series, The Guardian published reactions by many people who described how it had powerfully affected their lives for the good.

== Awards and nominations ==
Year	Nominee	Award	Result
2019	Suranne Jones	TVTimes Award for Best Actress	Won
2019	Gentleman Jack	TVTimes Award for Favourite Drama	Won
2020	Gentleman Jack	National Television Award for New Drama	Nominated
2020	Gentleman Jack	Royal Television Society Award for Best Drama Series	Won
2020	Gentleman Jack	British Academy Television Award for Best Drama Series	Nominated
2020	Suranne Jones	National Television Award for Best Drama Performance	Nominated
2020	Suranne Jones	Broadcasting Press Guild Award for Best Actress	Nominated
2020	Suranne Jones	Royal Television Society Award for Best Actor – Female	Nominated
2020	Suranne Jones	British Academy Television Award for Best Actress	Nominated

== Book ==
The series tie-in paperback book was released on 25 April 2019 in the United Kingdom by BBC Books under the title Gentleman Jack: The Real Anne Lister, and on 4 June 2019 in the United States by Penguin Random House as Gentleman Jack: The Diaries of Anne Lister. The book was written by Anne Choma, the historical adviser for the series.

== Ballet ==
A ballet inspired by the series, created by Northern Ballet, toured England and Finland from March 2026. Sally Wainwright is a creative consultant on the project.

== See also ==
- The Secret Diaries of Miss Anne Lister – 2010 BBC Two drama film about Anne Lister
