= Listed buildings in Northowram =

Northowram is in the ward of Northowram and Shelf in the metropolitan borough of Calderdale, West Yorkshire, England. It contains 32 listed buildings that are recorded in the National Heritage List for England. Of these, five are at Grade II*, the middle of the three grades, and the others are at Grade II, the lowest grade. The ward contains the village of Northowram, and areas to the west extending to the eastern boundary of Halifax, and includes the settlements of Shibden, Stump Cross and Claremount] Most of the listed buildings are houses, cottages and associated structures, farmhouses, and farm buildings. The other listed buildings include churches, a public house, an underground bath house, a slab wall, a former textile mill converted into flats, and a boundary stone.

== Key ==
Grade	Criteria
II*	Particularly important buildings of more than special interest
II	Buildings of national importance and special interest

== Buildings ==
Name and location	Photograph	Date	Notes	Grade
Tudor House; 53.72908°N 1.83106°W		Late medieval	The house was rebuilt and moved from the centre of Halifax to its present site in the 20th century. There are two storeys and a gabled porch. The ground floor and end walls, apart from the gables, are in modern stone, and the roof is in stone. The upper floor and the gables are timber framed.	II
Shibden Hall; 53.72805°N 1.83983°W		c. 1490	A timber framed house, originally with an H-shaped plan, consisting of a hall range and cross-wings, the hall range was encased in stone in the 16th century, the house was restored in the 19th century, and a tower was added at the west end in about 1835. The house has been a museum since 1934. The timber framing in the gabled cross-wings remains exposed, the roof is of stone, and at the east end is an added former kitchen and an arcaded loggia. The windows are mullioned and transomed. The tower is in Norman style, and has three stages and a pyramidal roof.	II*
Dam Head; 53.74297°N 1.84906°W		Early 16th century	The house was originally timber framed, and it was encased in stone in the 17th century. It has a stone roof, gabled on the west wing, and hipped on the east. It consists of a single-storey central range, two-storey cross-wings, and a two-storey rear range. The doorway is arched and has a hood mould. In the central range is a large mullioned and transomed window with 20 lights, and the windows in the wings are casements. On the gables of the rear wing are finials.	II
Marsh Hall; 53.74682°N 1.83736°W		Mid-16th century	The house was remodelled in 1626 and restored in the 1990s. It is in rendered stone with a stone roof. The house consists of a single-storey hall range, two-storey gabled cross-wings with finials, and a rear lean-to. The arched doorway has a moulded surround with initials in the spandrels and the date above. The windows are mullioned and transomed.	II*
Barn, Shibden Hall; 53.72828°N 1.83995°W		Early 17th century	The aisled barn and outbuildings, which have been altered, form part of a museum. The buildings are in stone with stone slate roofs, they are to the north of the hall, and form a courtyard with the barn at the north. The barn has a single storey and quoins, on the north front is a gabled cross-wing, and to the left is a 19th-century clock tower with a moulded eaves cornice, a cupola, and a weathervane. On the south front is a mounting block with a central dog kennel. The openings include doorways, windows, some with hood moulds, most of them mullioned, some also transomed, and pigeon openings with perches.	II*
High Royd Farmhouse; 53.73712°N 1.85911°W	—	17th century	A stone farmhouse with a stone roof, two storeys and a rear outshut. There is a two-storey gabled porch, a large mullioned and transomed window on the south side, and the other windows are mullioned.	II
Hillway House; 53.73916°N 1.83321°W	—	17th century (probable)	The house, which has been altered, is in stone, partly rendered, with a stone roof and two storeys. There is a main range, a gabled west cross-wing, and a rear outshut. In the angle is a gabled two-storey porch with an arched doorway. Some windows are mullioned, and others have been altered.	II
Lower Lime House; 53.74926°N 1.85373°W		17th century	A rendered house that has a stone slate roof with chamfered gable copings, moulded kneelers, and ball finials. There are two storeys, a main range, a rear wing and a rear outshut. The doorway is in a gabled porch, the windows are mullioned with some mullions removed, and in the left gable end is a round-arched fire window.	II
15 Town Gate; 53.73792°N 1.83216°W	—	1677	A stone cottage in a row, with a stone roof and two storeys. The windows are mullioned, and in the upper floor are two five-light windows. The ground floor contains a blocked doorway with an initialled and dated lintel.	II
Shoulder of Mutton public house and former Priestley Hall; 53.73831°N 1.83188°W		Late 17th century	The public house and former hall are in stone with slate roofs and both have two storeys. The public house has quoins, and consists of a main range and a gabled cross-wing on the left. The doorway has a plain surround, and the windows are mullioned, those in the cross-wing with hood moulds. The hall to the right has bands, a parapet, and three bays. The central doorway has a plain surround, the windows are mullioned, and at the rear is a tall stair window.	II
Scout Hall; 53.74573°N 1.85749°W		1680	A large house, later unused, it is in stone with moulded bands, and a hipped stone slate roof, gabled to the west. There are three storeys, eleven bays on the front, five bays on the sides, and seven at the rear. The central doorway has a moulded surround, a frieze with a carving of a fox and huntsmen, and a cornice. Two of the bays have a small oval window with a cornice in each floor, and in the other bays are mullioned and transomed windows.	II*
8 and 9 Tetley Lane; 53.73938°N 1.83244°W	—	1681	A house that has been altered, it is in stone, partly rendered, with a hipped stone roof, and two storeys. The original doorway has a dated lintel, and there is an inserted doorway to the right. The windows are mullioned, with up to eight lights, and there are hood moulds over the ground floor openings.	II
34 and 36 Staups Lane; 53.73386°N 1.84036°W	—	1684	A stone house with quoins, a continuous band, and a stone slate roof with coped gables and kneelers. There are two storeys, extensions to the rear, and on the front are three gabled bays. The doorway has a round-arched head, and above it is a dated and initialed plaque. The windows are mullioned and transomed, in the upper floor with stepped hood moulds.	II*
Scout Hall Farmhouse and outbuildings 53.74557°N 1.85640°W	—	1694	The farmhouse and outbuildings, which have been altered, are in stone with stone roofs. The house has two storeys, and contains an arched doorway above which are initials and the date.	II
Lower North Royd; 53.75076°N 1.84495°W	—	1699	A house with farm buildings to the east probably added in the 18th century. They are in stone with a stone roof and two storeys. The doorway is arched with a lintel, and over it is a moulded hood mould with scrolled ends. Above this is a dated and initialed tablet, and a circular window. The other windows are mullioned with hood moulds.	II
Adders Gate Farmhouse; 53.74797°N 1.84904°W		1700	The farmhouse is in stone and has a stone roof and two storeys. The doorway is arched, and above it a tablet with initials and the date. The farmhouse contains two five-light mullioned windows.	II
31 Town Gate; 53.73859°N 1.83233°W	—	17th or early 18th century	A house that has been altered, it is in stone with a hipped stone roof. There are two storeys, and the windows are mullioned. On the west is a wing incorporating a doorway from an earlier demolished house that has a dated lintel.	II
Baxter Farmhouse; 53.74043°N 1.83280°W	—	17th or early 18th century	A stone house, partly rendered with a stone roof. There are two storeys and a rear wing. The long north face contains windows irregularly spaced, with mullions missing.	II
Field House and service buildings 53.73431°N 1.84251°W	—	1713	A house with a service range including a barn to the west in stone, with bracketed eaves and a stone roof. There are two storeys and an attic. Most of the windows are mullioned, with a continuous hood mould over the ground floor openings. In the east gable end are paired sash windows, and in the attic is a stepped mullioned and transomed window. There are two doorways, one blocked with a dated and initialled plaque above it. The barn contains a cambered arch.	II
17 and 19 Town Gate; 53.73795°N 1.83205°W	—	18th century (probable)	A pair of stone cottages with stone roofs and two storeys. The windows are mullioned; in the front they have five lights, and in the gable end they have two or three lights.	II
Addersgate Cottages; 53.74781°N 1.84919°W		18th century	A pair of stone cottages that have a stone slate roof with a coped gable. There are two storeys at the front and one at the rear, and most of the windows are mullioned, with some mullions removed. On the front is a doorway with a plain surround, and a doorway with a massive lintel.	II
Garden Pavilion, Field House; 53.73425°N 1.84208°W	—	18th century (probable)	The building in the southeast corner of the garden is in stone with a stone roof. It has a square plan, and on the front is a three-light mullioned window with a blind central light above. On the sides are a doorway and sash windows.	II
Underground bath house, Northowram Hall; 53.74418°N 1.83370°W	—	Mid-18th century (probable)	The bath house was built to serve the hall, and is in stone with some brick. Steps lead down to the main room, which has a vaulted roof, and contains a plunge pool with moulded edges. Pointed arches lead to smaller rooms on the north and south, the south room containing a foot bath. Above ground are two circular cast iron skylights in concrete.	II
Lee House; 53.74334°N 1.85740°W	—	Late 18th century	A stone house with an eaves cornice and a hipped stone roof. There are two storeys, a front of five bays with a pediment over the middle three bays, three bays on the east front, and an earlier lower west wing. The doorway has a segmental pediment on brackets. The windows on the front are sashes, at the rear is an arched stair window, and there are mullioned windows at the rear and in the wing.	II
Slab wall 53.74241°N 1.83475°W		c. 1780	The wall extends along the north side of the footpath between Upper Lane and Hall Lane. It consists of 224 upright stone slabs about 1 metre (3 ft 3 in) high, and extends for 174 metres (571 ft).	II
Garden Street Mill; 53.72762°N 1.85536°W		1831	A former cotton mill converted into flats, it is in sandstone with bracketed eaves, and a Welsh slate roof with coped gables. There are five storeys and 14 bays. Above the middle four bays is a pediment containing a Venetian window, and the second bay has a projecting former toilet block. To the right is the former single-bay engine house that contains a tall round-headed window with a rusticated surround and a single-light window above.	II
Northowram United Reformed Church; 53.73686°N 1.83295°W		1836–37	The church is in sandstone, it has two storeys and a lower ground floor, a front of three bays, and five bays along the sides. The entrance front has a pedimented gable with shaped kneelers. The central bay has a shallow arch enclosing the doorway and the window above. The doorway is arched, with a keystone, and the windows have marginal glazing. Above the doorway is a re-set datestone from the previous church dated 1672.	II
Spa House; 53.73535°N 1.84594°W	—	c. 1840	Built as a bath house to serve local springs, it is in stone with a stone slate roof, and is in Italianate style. The building has a two-storey gabled central bay, flanked by projecting single-storey wings. The central bay has deep eaves on moulded brackets, and contains a tripartite window and above is a Venetian window in an arch. The wings have cornices, they contain round-arched windows with pilasters, and in the inner walls are doorways. Inside the left wing is a sunken stone-lined bath approached by steps.	II
Boundary stone by Spaniard Hall; 53.75494°N 1.83421°W		Mid-19th century	The stone, which marks the boundary between Northowram and Shelf is by a wall on a road. It consists of a small arched stone inscribed with a vertical line and the names of the districts.	II
St Thomas' Church; 53.72890°N 1.85280°W		1859–61	The church is in sandstone with a slate roof, and is in Decorated style. It consists of a nave with a clerestory, north and south aisles, a north porch, north and south transepts, a chancel, and a southeast tower. The tower has three stages, angle buttresses, a southeast turret, and an embattled parapet.	II
Northowram Hall and conservatory 53.74428°N 1.83344°W		1862–63	A country house in stone on a plinth, with bands, angle pilasters, an eaves cornice and blocking course, and slate roofs with finials. There are two storeys, an L-shaped plan, and fronts of six and eight bays. Most of the windows are cross casements. At the entrance is a portico with rusticated columns, a crested parapet, and a round-headed doorway with a fanlight. This is flanked by two-storey bay windows, and to the right is a two-bay wing. Attached to the right side of the house is a carriage arch with a round-topped shouldered gable. The conservatory is in wood and glass with a clerestory, a hipped roof, and nine bays.	II
St Matthew's Church; 53.73876°N 1.82937°W		1911–13	The church is in sandstone and ironstone, with a stone slate roof, and consists of a nave with a clerestory, north and south aisles, a south porch, north and south transepts, a chancel with a south chapel, and a link connecting to a northeast tower. The tower has three stages, buttresses rising to crocketed gables, a clock face, and an embattled parapet.	II
