= Jeremy Lister =

British officer

Captain Jeremy Lister (28 September 1752 – 3 April 1836) was a British officer in the 10th Regiment of Foot during the early days of the American Revolution. His journal was later published as Concord fight: Being so much of the narrative of Ensign Jeremy Lister of the 10th Regiment of Foot as pertains to his services on 19 April 1775.

== Life ==
Lister was born at Shibden Hall, England in 1752. In 1770, Lister was commissioned an ensign with the 10th Regiment of Foot in England and sailed for Canada. After being stationed at Fort Niagara in America he saw action at Lexington and Concord, Massachusetts. He was wounded in the right elbow during the expedition to Concord and North Bridge. On 17 February 1781 Lister was promoted to captain. He stayed with the 10th until 1783. He sold his commission and settled in Market Weighton and later at Halifax in West Yorkshire. He died at the family estate Shibden Hall in 1836.

== Family ==
Lister married Rebecca Battle (1770–1817), with whom he had six children:

- John (born and died 1789), died as an infant
- Anne Lister (3 April 1791 – 22 September 1840), inherited Shibden Hall and wrote an extensive diary, of her daily life, travels and lesbian romances
- Ensign Samuel (16 June 1793 – 19 June 1813) died at Fermoy
- John (3 February 1795 – 24 January 1810)
- Marian (13 October 1798 – 6 August 1882)
- Jeremy (27 September 1801 – 7 February 1802)
