= Anne Lister =

English landowner and lesbian diarist (1791–1840)

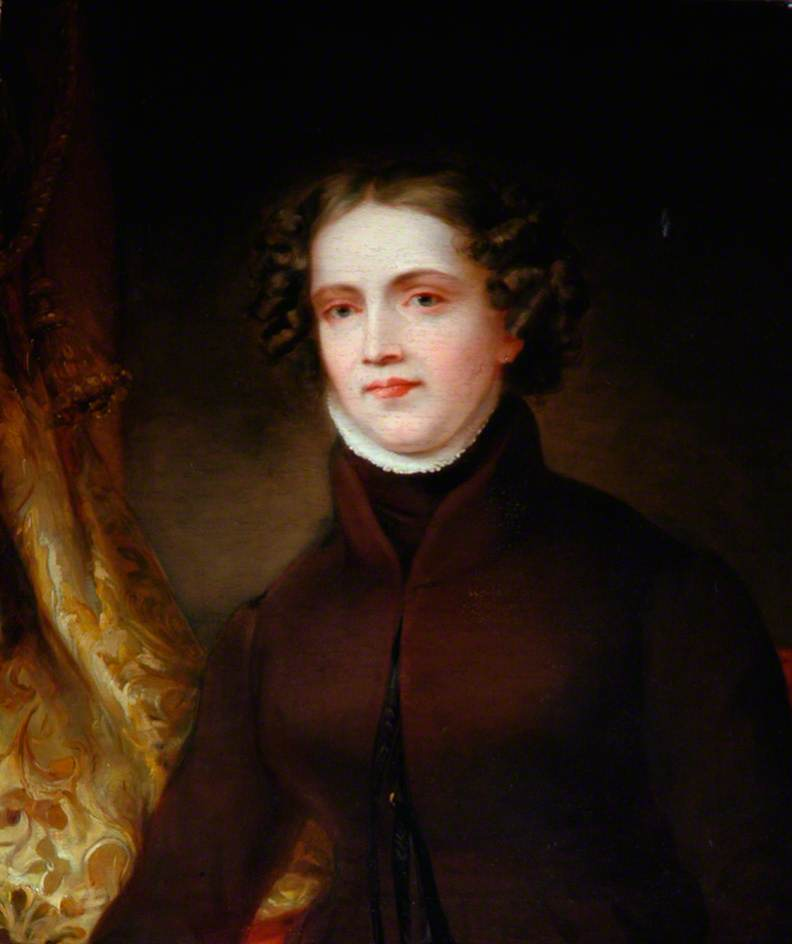
- Portrait (c. 1830)
- Born: 3 April 1791; Halifax, West Riding of Yorkshire, England
- Died: 22 September 1840 (aged 49); Kutaisi, Georgia-Imeretia Governorate, Russian Empire
- Resting place: St John the Baptist Church Halifax Minster
- Occupation: Landowner
- Known for: "The First modern Lesbian"
- Partner: Ann Walker (1834–1840; Lister's death)

Anne Lister (3 April 1791 – 22 September 1840) was an English diarist and landowner, famous for revelations for which she was dubbed "the first modern lesbian".

Lister was from a minor landowning family at Shibden in Calderdale, West Riding of Yorkshire. She had several lesbian love affairs from her schooldays onwards, often on long trips abroad; muscular and androgynous in appearance, always dressed in black and highly educated, she was later known—generally unkindly—as "Gentleman Jack". Her final significant relationship was with Ann Walker, to whom she was notionally married in Holy Trinity Church, Goodramgate, York, which is now celebrated as the birthplace of lesbian marriage in Britain.

Lister's diaries reveal much about contemporary life in the West Riding of Yorkshire, including her development of historic Shibden Hall and her interests in medicine, mathematics, landscaping, mining, railways and canals. Many entries were written in code that was not decrypted until long after her death. Containing graphic portrayals of lesbian relationships, these diaries were so frank that they were thought to be a hoax until their authenticity was confirmed.

== Biography ==
=== Early life and education ===
Anne Lister was the second child and eldest daughter of Captain Jeremy Lister (1753–1836) who, as a young man in 1775, served with the British 10th Regiment of Foot in the Battles of Lexington and Concord in the American War of Independence. In August 1788, he married Rebecca Battle (1770–1817) of Welton in the East Riding of Yorkshire. Their first child, John, was born in 1789 but died the same year. Anne Lister was born in Halifax on 3 April 1791. The family moved in 1793 to an estate named Skelfler House at Market Weighton, which is where Anne spent her earliest years. A second son, Samuel, who was close to Anne, was born in 1793. The Listers had four sons and three (Note: Per the church's burial records of All Saints Church in Market Weighton, there is a Lister infant (a sister of Anne Lister) who was buried at the Minster in April 1806, shortly after birth.) daughters, but only Anne and her younger sister Marian (born 13 October 1798) survived past 20 years old.

At the age of seven, Lister was sent to a school in Agnesgate, Ripon, run by a Mrs Hagues and a Mrs Chettle. Between 1801 and 1804, she was educated at home by the Reverend George Skelding, who was the vicar of Market Weighton. Whenever she visited her aunt Anne and Uncle James at Shibden Hall, the Misses Mellin gave her lessons.

While being educated at home, Lister developed an interest in classical literature. In a surviving letter to her aunt from 3 February 1803, the eleven-year-old Lister explains, "My library is my greatest pleasure... The Grecian History had pleased me much."

=== Relationship with Eliza Raine ===
In 1805, Anne Lister was sent to the Manor House School in York (in the King's Manor buildings), where Anne met her first love, Eliza Raine (1791–1860). Raine was the illegitimate, half-Indian daughter of an East India Company surgeon in Madras, brought to Yorkshire after his death and set to inherit a substantial amount of money. Lister and Raine shared a bedroom at the boarding school. Raine later became a patient at Clifton House Asylum, run by Belcombe's father, William, in 1814. Eliza Raine was later transferred to Terrace House in Osbaldwick and died there on 31 December 1860. She is buried in the Osbaldwick churchyard across the road.

=== Shibden Hall ===
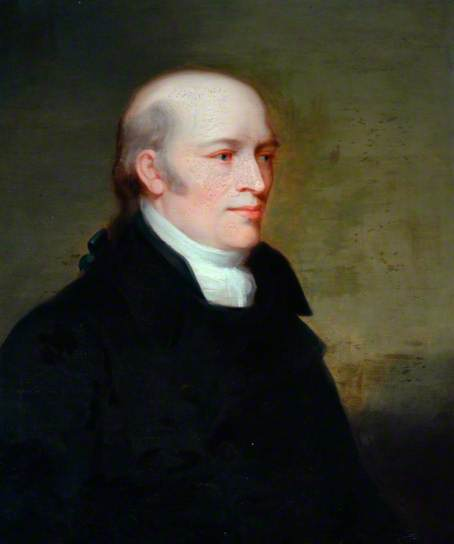
James Lister, from whom Anne Lister inherited the Shibden estate in 1826. Portrait by Joshua Horner (1812–1884).

Lister inherited the Shibden estate on her uncle's death in 1826, but she only controlled part of its income until the deaths of both her father and her aunt in 1836, when their shares of the income passed to her. In addition to earnings from the agricultural tenancy, Lister's financial portfolio included properties in town, shares in the canal and railway industries, mining, and stone quarries. Her wealth allowed her some measure of freedom to live as she pleased, and she used the income from her varied portfolio to finance her two passions: the renovation of Shibden Hall, and European travel.

Lister is described as having a "masculine appearance". One of her lovers, Mariana Lawton (née Belcombe), was initially ashamed to be seen in public with her because of the comments made on Lister's appearance. She dressed entirely in black (as was normal for gentlemen at the time) and took part in many activities that were not perceived as the norm for women of the time, such as opening and owning a colliery. She was referred to as "Gentleman Jack" in some quarters.

Lawton and Lister were lovers, on and off, for about two decades, including a period during which Lawton was married and to which her husband became resigned.

=== Relationship with Ann Walker ===
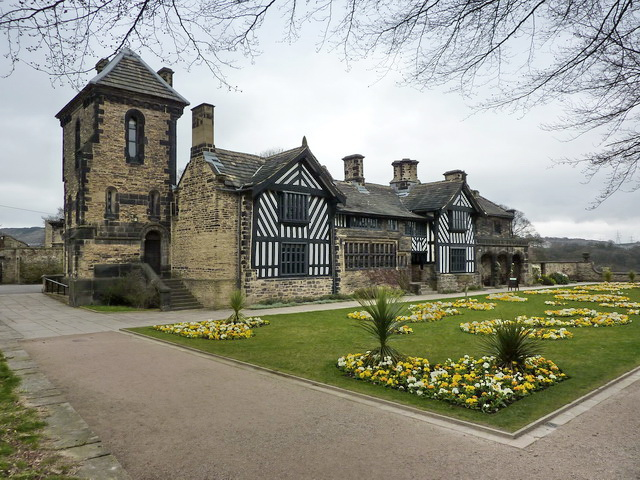
Shibden Hall in 2010, with the library tower added by Anne Lister on the left

Although Lister had met her on various occasions in the 1820s, Ann Walker—who by 1832 had become a wealthy heiress—took on a much more substantial role in Lister's later life. Eventually the women took communion together on Easter Sunday (30 March) 1834 in Holy Trinity Church, Goodramgate, York, and thereafter considered themselves married, but without legal recognition. The church has been described as "an icon for what is interpreted as the site of the first lesbian marriage to be held in Britain", and the building now hosts a commemorative blue plaque. The couple lived together at Shibden Hall until Lister's death in 1840.

Lister renovated Shibden Hall quite significantly to her own design. In 1838, she added a Gothic tower to the main house, to serve as her private library. She also had a tunnel dug under the building so the staff could move about without disturbing her.

Throughout her life, Lister had a strong Anglican faith, and she remained a Tory, "interested in defending the privileges of the land-owning aristocracy".

=== Travel ===
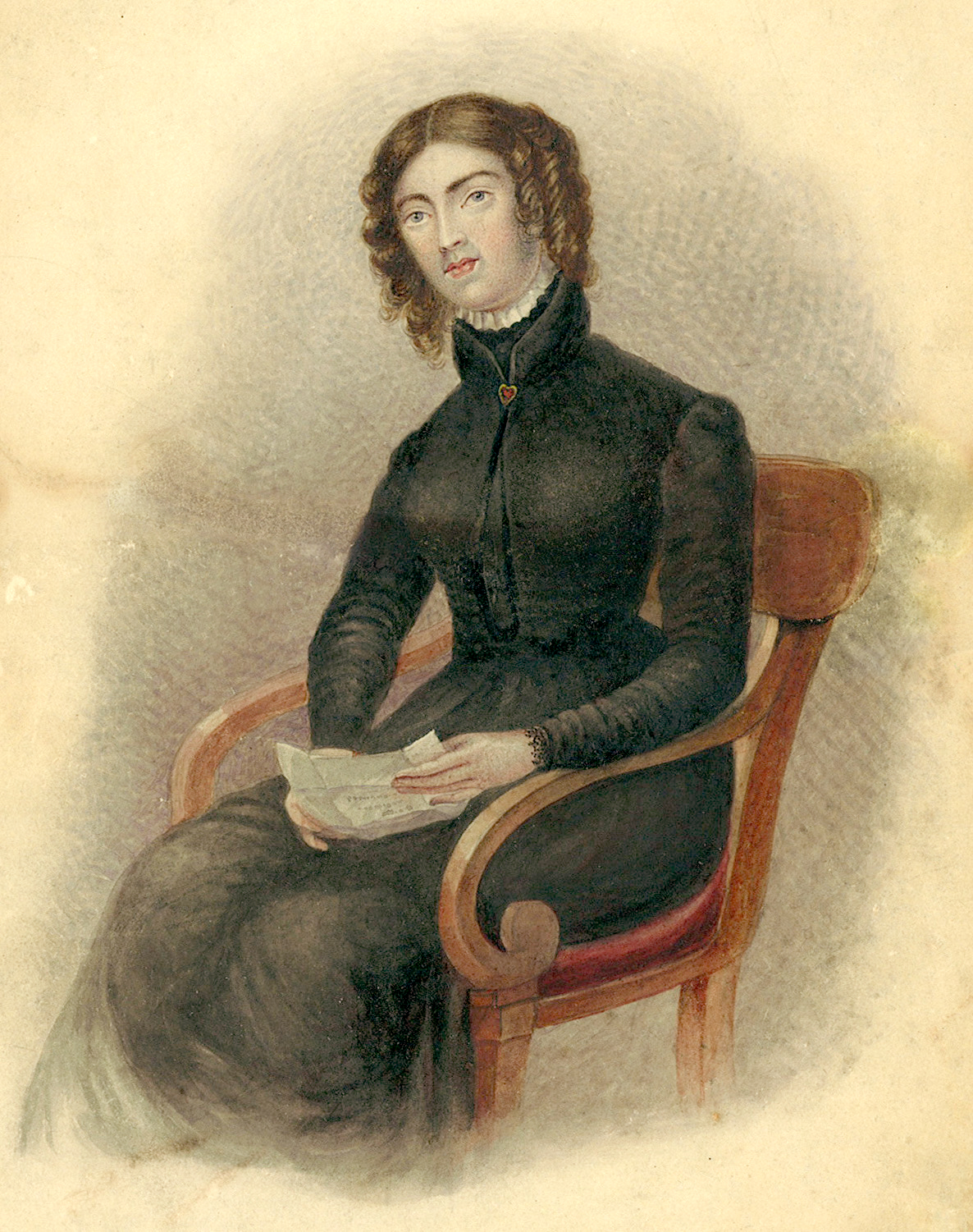
Watercolour portrait of Lister, probably by a Mrs Turner of Halifax, 1822

Lister greatly enjoyed travel, although her biographer Angela Steidele suggests her trips in later life were also a way to "evade the self realisation that she had failed at everything she set her hand to". She made her first trip to continental Europe in 1819, when she was 28 years old, travelling with her 54-year-old aunt (also called Anne Lister) on a two-month trip to France.

She returned to Paris in 1824 and stayed there until the following year. Returning to Paris with her Aunt Anne in 1826, she resumed an affair with a widow named Maria Barlow whom she had met on her previous visit to the city. She set out from Paris with Barlow in 1827 on a tour of northern Italy and Switzerland, returning to Shibden Hall the following year. In 1828, she travelled extensively in Scotland with Sibella MacLean.

Lister set out for the continent again in 1829. Using Paris as her base, she visited Belgium and Germany before heading south to the Pyrenees where she did some hiking and crossed the border into Spain. While there, she demonstrated both her strong adventurous streak and considerable physical fitness by ascending Monte Perdido (11,007 ft; 3,355 m), the third highest peak in the Pyrenees.

Returning to Shibden Hall in 1831, Lister found life with her father and sister Marian so uncomfortable that she left again almost immediately to visit the Netherlands for a short trip with Mariana Lawton. Altogether, between 1826 and 1832, she spent only a short period of time at Shibden Hall, her travels around Britain and Europe allowing her to avoid spending time at home with her family.

She again visited France and Switzerland in 1834, this time for her honeymoon with Ann Walker. Returning with Walker in 1838, she headed south to the Pyrenees and completed the first tourist ascent of the Vignemale, (Note: The first ascension probably took place in 1792 and the first official ascension was attributed to Henri Cazaux in 1837, who Lister hired as her guide.) the highest peak in the French Pyrenees (10,820 ft; 3,300 m). This required a ten-hour hike to reach the top and another seven hours to descend.

Lister's final and most extensive trip began in June 1839, when she left Shibden Hall accompanied by Walker and two servants; they travelled in their own carriage through France, Denmark, Sweden, Norway and Russia, arriving in St Petersburg in September and Moscow in October. With a reluctant Walker in tow, she left Moscow in February 1840 in a new Russian carriage and with very warm clothing. They travelled south, along the frozen Volga river, to the Caucasus. Few people from Western Europe had visited this area, let alone West European women, in part because of unrest amongst the local population against the Tsarist regime. At times they needed a military escort, and the two women were a source of great curiosity to the people they visited. As Lister noted in her diary, "The people coming in to look at us as if we were some strange animals such as they had not seen the like before."

=== Death ===
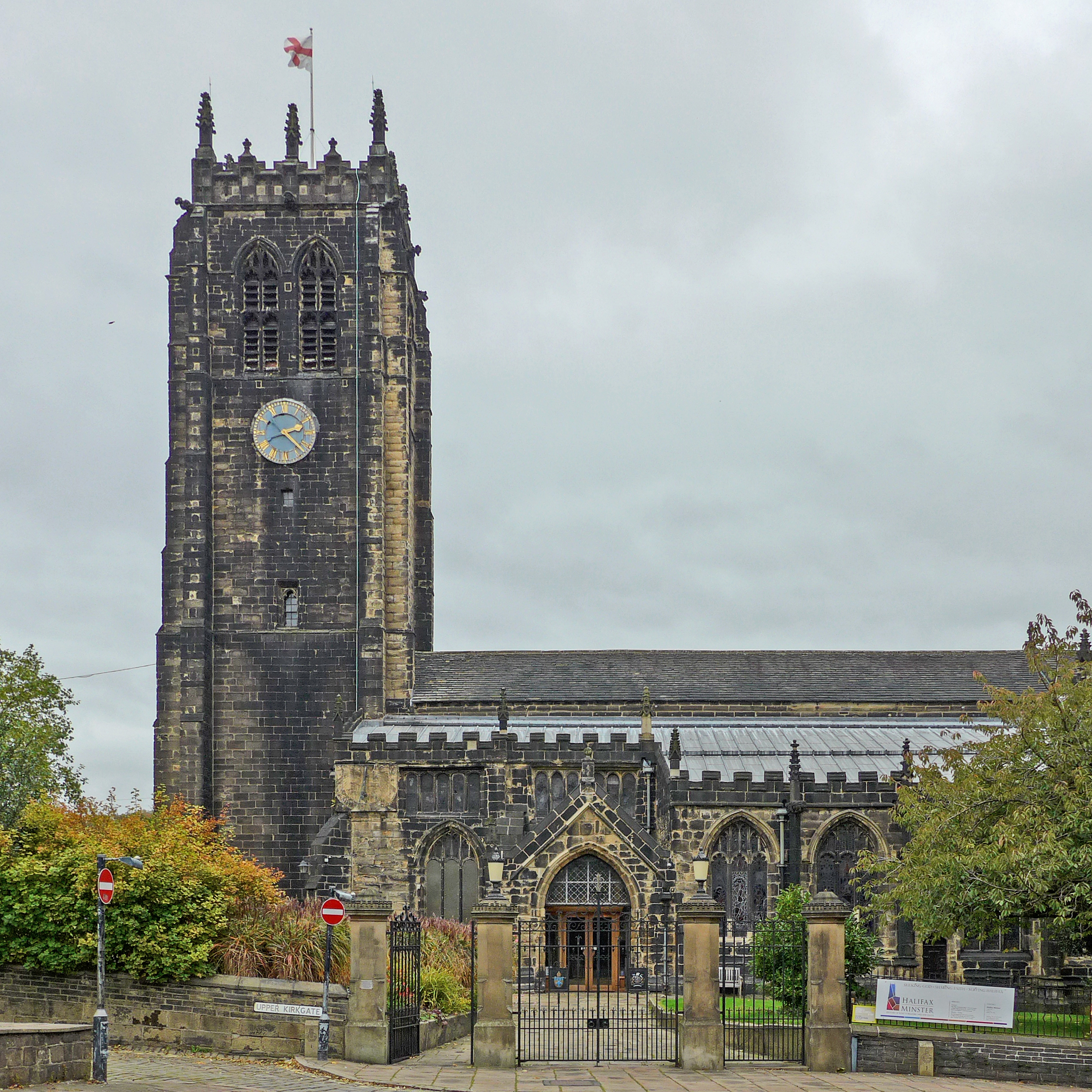
Halifax Minster, where Anne Lister is buried

Lister died on 22 September 1840, aged 49, of a fever at Koutais (now Kutaisi in Georgia) while travelling with Ann Walker. Walker had Lister's body brought back to the UK, where she was buried in Halifax Minster, on 29 April 1841. Her tombstone was rediscovered in 2000, having been covered by a floor in 1879.

In her will, Lister's estate was left to her paternal cousins, but Walker was given a life interest. After being declared to be of "unsound mind", Walker spent time briefly in Terrace House, a private house in Osbaldwick, and then in the London area with her sister and brother-in-law. Walker returned to Shibden Hall in 1845 and moved back to her family's estate in Lightcliffe in 1848. She died in 1854 at her childhood home, Cliff Hill in Lightcliffe, West Yorkshire.

More than 40 years after her death, while reporting on a dispute over the ownership of Shibden Hall, the Leeds Times in 1882 stated, "Miss Lister's masculine singularities of character are still remembered".

== Diaries ==
During her life, Lister wrote a five-million-word diary. It began in 1806 as scraps of paper, recording in secret code parcels sent to and from Eliza Raine, and eventually became the 26 quarto volumes, ending at her death in 1840. In addition to her handwriting being difficult to decipher, around one-sixth of the diary is encrypted in a simple code Eliza and she had devised, combining the Greek alphabet, zodiac, punctuation, and mathematical symbols, and it describes in great detail her lesbian identity and affairs, as well as the methods she used for seduction. The diaries also contain her thoughts on the weather, social events, national events, and her business interests. The majority of her diary deals with her daily life, and not merely her sexuality, and provides detailed information on social, political, and economic events of the time.

The cypher used in her diaries was deciphered by the last inhabitant of Shibden Hall, John Lister (1847–1933) and a friend of his, Arthur Burrell. When the content of the secret passages was revealed, Burrell advised John Lister to burn all the diaries. Lister did not take this advice, but instead continued to hide Anne Lister's diaries behind a panel at Shibden Hall.

The cypher is as follows:

a	b	c	d	e	f	g	h	i	j	k	l	m	n	o	p	q	r	s	t	u	v	w	x	y	z	ch	sh	th	&
2	(	)	0	3	v	n	o	4	4	ǀ	d	—	\	5	+	ǁ	p	=	~	6	g	8	w	7	9	∇	Λ	🗸	×

Underlining or dotting a letter was used to double it; in the cases of ⟨(⟩, ⟨)⟩ and ⟨+⟩ the doubling line went through the letter (so that pp looked rather like ⟨ǂ⟩), and in the case of ⟨~⟩, the doubling line was vertical (so that tt looked a bit like ⟨ɫ⟩), but the following double letters had special forms: ee ⟨;⟩, ff ⟨Q⟩, ll ⟨:⟩, oo ⟨!⟩, ss ⟨?⟩. Mr was an ⟨x⟩, with single and double cross-bars for Mrs and Miss, so that Mrs looked rather like ⟨𝔛⟩.

In 2011, Lister's diaries were added to the register of the UNESCO Memory of the World Programme. The register citation notes that, while a valuable account of the times, it was the "comprehensive and painfully honest account of lesbian life and reflections on her nature, however, which have made these diaries unique. They have shaped and continue to shape the direction of UK Gender Studies and Women's History."

Lister's diaries have been described as part of a "trilogy of early 19th century diaries" by local women, covering the same period from different perspectives, along with those of Caroline Walker from 1812 to 1830, and Elizabeth Wadsworth from 1817 to 1829. In 2020, Ann Walker's own journal was discovered. Although brief, covering June 1834 to February 1835, it covers a pivotal period that weaves through the corresponding narratives in Lister's diary.

== Research ==
Work by Dorothy Thompson and Patricia Hughes in the late 1980s at Birmingham University's Department of Modern History resulted in translation of much of the code, as well as discovery of the first juvenile Lister diaries and decoding of the other two Lister codes. Hughes self-published The Early Life of Miss Anne Lister and the Curious Tale of Miss Eliza Raine (2010) and Anne Lister's Secret Diary for 1817 (2019), both of which make extensive use of other materials in the Lister archives including letters, diaries, and ancillary documents.

Helena Whitbread published some of the diaries in two volumes (1988 and 1992). Their graphic nature meant at first they were believed by some to be a hoax, but documentary evidence has since established their authenticity. A biography by the British writer Jill Liddington appeared in 1994. In 2014, a conference held at Shibden Hall focused on Lister's life along with gender and sexuality in the 19th century.

A biography by Angela Steidele in the German language was published in 2017, and published in English in 2018. In 2022 Russian researcher Olga Khoroshilova published a book about Lister's final and dramatic journey in Russia. In a 2013 Journal of Lesbian Studies paper, by Chris Roulston, she was described as "the first modern lesbian".

== Popular culture ==
The first episode of the 1994 BBC Two series A Skirt Through History, titled "A Marriage", features Julia Ford as Anne Lister, and Sophie Thursfield as Marianna Belcombe.

On 31 May 2010, BBC Two broadcast a production based on Lister's life, The Secret Diaries of Miss Anne Lister, starring Maxine Peake as Lister. Revealing Anne Lister, a documentary presented by Sue Perkins, was broadcast on the same night on BBC Two.

Chamber folk duo O'Hooley & Tidow included a song about Anne Lister, "Gentleman Jack", on their 2012 album The Fragile.

The 2019 BBC-HBO historical TV drama series Gentleman Jack, created and written by Sally Wainwright, and starring Suranne Jones as Lister, depicts her life as "the first modern lesbian". The series is billed as "inspired by" two books about Lister by Jill Liddington, Female Fortune and Nature's Domain. Liddington also acted as a consultant for the series. O'Hooley & Tidow's "Gentleman Jack" serves as the series' closing theme music. In 2019 Penguin Books published a companion volume by the series' senior consultant, Anne Choma, which includes newly transcribed and decoded entries from Lister's diaries.

In 2022 a second series of Gentleman Jack aired, first on BBC One between 10 April and 29 May, and then on HBO between 5 April and 13 June. Shortly after the second series ended, a campaign was started to renew the show, which then transformed into an effort to save the show as on 7 July it was announced that Gentleman Jack had been cancelled by HBO.

In 2026, a ballet inspired by Anne Lister's life (and the series Gentleman Jack), created by Northern Ballet toured England and Finland; Wainwright was a creative consultant on the project.

Emma Donoghue's novel Learned by Heart tells the story of Eliza Raine and Lister from Raine's point of view.

== Plaque ==
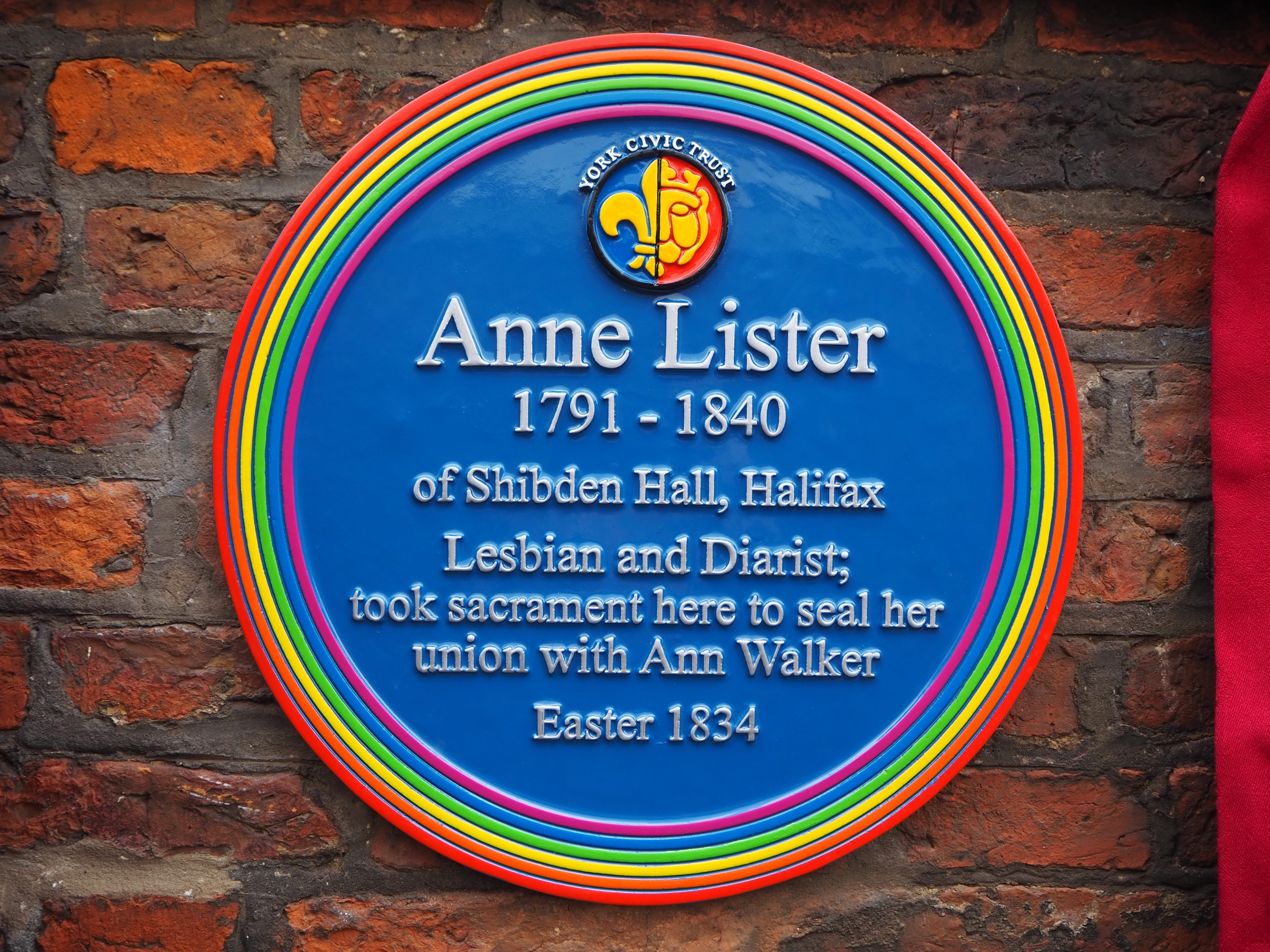
The rainbow plaque outside Holy Trinity Church, Goodramgate, York, dedicated to Anne Lister and Ann Walker, as seen in May 2019

In 2018, a blue plaque was unveiled at Holy Trinity Church in York to honour Lister. With a rainbow edging, it was York's first LGBTQ history plaque (or rainbow plaque).

The plaque originally read: "Anne Lister 1791–1840 Gender-nonconforming entrepreneur. Celebrated marital commitment, without legal recognition, to Ann Walker in this church. Easter, 1834". This wording was criticised for not mentioning Lister's sexuality, and in 2019, a replacement plaque was installed which included the wording: "Lesbian and Diarist; took sacrament here to seal her union with Ann Walker".

== See also ==
- Boston marriage
- Anne Lister College

== Sources ==
- Choma, Anne (2019). Gentleman Jack: The Real Anne Lister. Foreword by Sally Wainwright. BBC Books. ISBN 978-1-78594404-8.
- Green, Muriel M., ed. (1992). Miss Lister of Shibden Hall: Selected Letters (1800–1840). The Book Guild Ltd. ISBN 978-0-86332-672-1.
- Hughes, Patricia (2014) [2010]. The Early Life of Miss Anne Lister and the Curious Tale of Miss Eliza Raine (2nd Revised ed.). Hues Books. ISBN 978-1-909275-06-5.
- Hughes, Patricia (2019). Gentleman Jack: Anne Lister's Secret Diary for 1817. Hues Books. ISBN 978-1-909275-30-0.
- Khoroshilova, Olga (2022). Gentleman Jack in Russia (in Russian). Mann, Ivanov & Ferber. ISBN 978-5-00169-736-7.
- Liddington, Jill (1994). Presenting the Past: Anne Lister of Halifax, 1791–1840. Pennine Pens. ISBN 978-1-873378-02-1.
- Liddington, Jill (1998). Female Fortune: Land, Gender and Authority: The Anne Lister Diaries and Other Writings, 1833–36. Rivers Oram Press. ISBN 978-1-52616442-1.
- Steidele, Angela (2018). Gentleman Jack. A Biography of Anne Lister: Regency Landowner, Seducer and Secret Diarist. Translated by Katy Derbyshire. London: Serpent's Tail. ISBN 978-1-78816098-8. First published as Steidele, Angela (2017). Anne Lister. Eine erotische Biographie. Berlin: Matthes & Seitz. ISBN 978-3-95757445-9.
- Vicinus, Martha (2004). Intimate Friends: Women Who Loved Women, 1778–1928. University of Chicago Press. ISBN 978-0-226-85563-9.
- Whitbread, Helena, ed. (1992) [1988]. I Know My Own Heart: The Diaries of Anne Lister, 1791–1840. NYU Press. ISBN 978-0-8147-9248-3.
- Whitbread, Helena, ed. (1993) [1992]. No Priest But Love: The Journals of Anne Lister From 1824–1826. NYU Press. ISBN 978-0-8147-5077-3.
