= Helena Whitbread =

English writer who decoded Anne Lister's diaries (born 1931)

- Born: 1931 (age 94–95)
- Occupation: Author
- Writing career
- Genres: Historical non-fiction
- Notable work: The Secret Diaries of Miss Anne Lister

Helena Whitbread MBE (born 1931) is an English writer from Halifax, West Yorkshire. She is best known for the decryption and editing of the 19th-century Halifax lesbian landowner Anne Lister's secret coded diaries. She became intrigued by the Lister diaries in the 1980s and spent five years decoding and transcribing Lister's entire collection of writings, working on 50 pages each weekend, and became the first researcher to publish the diaries' coded passages.

The diaries consist of 27 books, over six thousand pages, and over four million words. The Anne Lister diaries decoded by Whitbread are recognized by The United Nations as a ‘pivotal’ set of documents in British history; in 2011, they were added to the Memory of the World Register. The Register's list is compiled by the UN Cultural Organization UNESCO and the archives are available online as historical UK documents.

During the years Whitbread spent researching Anne Lister's journals, she was employed at a private religious school. Once her manuscript was accepted for publication she advised the school Director that what she would be publishing would contain graphic content and intimate details of lesbian sexuality. Such was her conviction of the critical sociological relevance of this work that she was prepared for any reaction. Instead Monsignor recognised the importance of the work and the impact it would have; he told Whitbread “you have lit a fuse (for social change).”

Originally published as I Know My Own Heart: The Diaries of Anne Lister 1791-1840 (in 1988) and No Priest But Love: The Journals of Anne Lister From 1824–1826 (in 1992), her books were republished in two volumes under the combined title The Secret Diaries of Miss Anne Lister, to coincide with a biographical television drama of the same name in 2010 starring Maxine Peake.

Whitbread's research, along with additional research by Anne Choma and Jill Liddington, became the basis for a fuller dramatisation of Lister's life when it was adapted for television in a joint BBC-HBO production titled Gentleman Jack, consisting of two series that premiered in 2019 and 2022. The adaptation was conceived, written, and directed by Sally Wainwright and starred actress Suranne Jones. It was also the inspiration for a song released earlier in 2012 titled "Gentleman Jack", written and recorded by Golcar artists O'Hooley & Tidow, which was played over the opening and closing credits of each episode of the aforementioned series.

In 2016, Helena Whitbread and Natasha Holme co-authored Secret Diaries Past & Present: Q&A With.., a book structured in the form of questions and answers, comparing and contrasting the diaries and lives of 19th century lesbian diarist Anne Lister and modern-day lesbian diarist Natasha Holme.

Whitbread was appointed Member of the Order of the British Empire (MBE) in the 2023 New Year Honours for services to history and literature.
