= Old St Matthew's Church, Lightcliffe =

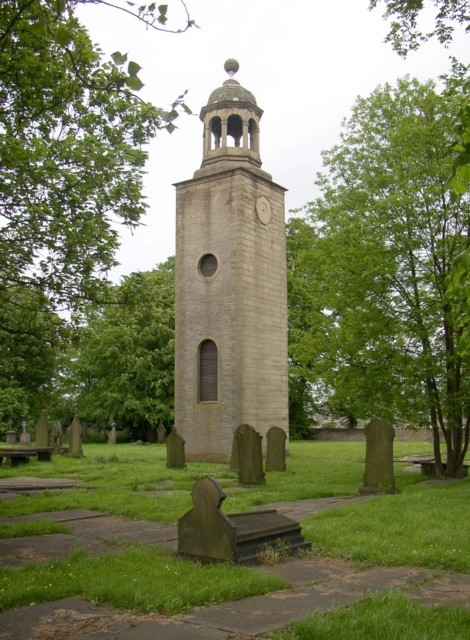
- Tower of Old St Matthew's Church, Lightcliffe

- Location in West Yorkshire
- 53.7245°N 1.7896°W
- Location: Lightcliffe, West Yorkshire, England
- OS grid reference: SE 140 254

History
- Built: 1775

Site notes
- Architect: William Mallinson
- Architectural style: Neoclassical
- Governing body: Friends of Friendless Churches

Listed Building – Grade II
- Designated: 3 January 1967

Old St Matthew's Church, Lightcliffe, is a former church in the village of Lightcliffe, West Yorkshire, England, of which only the tower remains. It is recorded in the National Heritage List for England as a designated Grade II listed building, and is under the care of the Friends of Friendless Churches.

== History ==
The original building on the site was a chapel of ease called Eastfield Chapel, which was built in 1529. This was damaged during the Reformation, and repaired in 1536. The chapel was rebuilt as a church in Neoclassical style in 1775, and designed by William Mallinson of Halifax. It was replaced in the late 19th century by a new church a short distance away. The old church was then used as a mortuary chapel. It was severely damaged by a storm in the 1960s and its fabric deteriorated and the church suffered from vandalism. The Bishop of Wakefield wanted to have the whole church demolished. After negotiation, it was agreed that the diocese would pay for the demolition of the body of the church, while the Friends of Friendless Churches would be responsible for financing the repair and restoration of the tower. The Friends were granted a 99-year lease on the tower on 1 January 1974. The repair work was carried out by Marshalls of Elland and it was supervised by the Gothic expert Dr John Harvey. Further repairs were carried out in 1990 at a cost of £5,800.

The church is the subject of a painting by Yorkshire artist Peter Brook.

== Architecture ==
The tower is square in cross-section and constructed in hammer-dressed stone with ashlar dressings. On the west face is a round-headed window with a circular window above. At belfry level is inscribed stone taken from an earlier church on the site. At the top of the tower is an octagonal cupola with a ball finial. Inside the tower are an inscribed stone dated 1529, benefaction boards, and a monument from 1830 designed by Richard Westmacott.
