= Shibden Hall =

Historic house museum in West Yorkshire, England

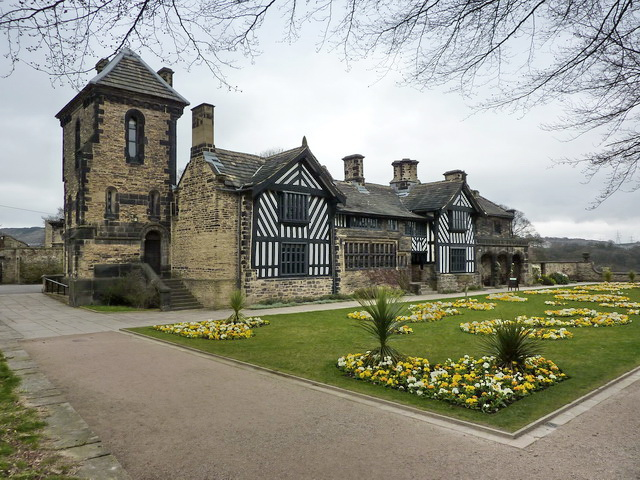
- Shibden Hall in 2010

- Location within West Yorkshire
- Established: 1420
- Location: Lister's Road, Halifax, West Yorkshire, England HX3 6XG
- Coordinates: 53°43′41.7″N 1°50′24″W
- Type: Historic house museum
- Website: Shibden Hall

Listed Building – Grade II*
- Official name: Shibden Hall
- Designated: 3 November 1954
- Reference no.: 1254036

Shibden Hall is a Grade II* listed historic house located in a public park at Shibden, West Yorkshire, England. The building has been extensively modified from its original design by generations of residents, although its Tudor half-timbered frontage remains its most recognisable feature.

One of its most notable residents was Anne Lister who inherited the hall from a relative. Lister has been described as being the "first modern lesbian" due to her "love... [of] the fairer sex" that she documented in her diaries.

== History ==
The hall dates back to around 1420 when it was recorded as being inhabited by one William Otes. Before 1612, the estate was owned by the Savile and Waterhouse families. The three families' armorial symbols are recorded in a stone-mullioned 20-light window at the hall. The property was acquired in 1612 on behalf of John Hemingway, who died young. John Hemingway had two sisters Phoebe and Sarah who also lived at Shibden Hall. Samuel Lister, John’s uncle, who was John’s trustee arranged for his two sons to marry the Hemingway sisters when they reached 16 years of age. Because of this Samuel Lister claimed inheritance in 1619.

For more than 300 years (1619 to 1926), the Shibden estate was in the hands of the Lister family who were wealthy mill owners and cloth merchants. Its most famous resident was Anne Lister (1791–1840) who became sole owner of the hall after the death of her aunt. In 1830, she commissioned York architect John Harper and landscape gardener Samuel Gray to make extensive improvements to the house and grounds. A gothic tower was added to the building for use as a library, and the major features of the park were created, including terraced gardens, rock gardens, cascades and a boating lake. A "Paisley shawl" garden designed for the terrace by Joshua Major was added in the 1850s. After Anne Lister's death in 1840, the estate passed to her partner Ann Walker, who died in 1854; ownership then returned to the Lister family. When John Lister experienced financial difficulties, Arthur McCrea took over the mortgages and subsequently donated the hall to Halifax Corporation, which opened it as a museum in 1934. The estate became a public park in 1926, and the hall a museum in 1934.

The property has been a Grade II* listed building since 3 November 1954. The park and gardens were restored between 2007 and 2008 with almost £3.9 million from the Heritage Lottery Fund and £1.2 million from Calderdale Council. The gardens were listed Grade II on 27 June 2000.

The hall is currently open to the public, the West Yorkshire Folk Museum being housed in an adjoining barn and farm buildings. The hall has a variety of restored workshops, including a brewery, a basket-weaving shop, a tannery, a stable and an extensive collection of horse-drawn carriages. The park also contains a dry stone walling exhibition, a children's play area, and a miniature steam railway.

The hall was used for filming the 2018 British historical drama Peterloo and the 2019/2022 BBC/HBO television series Gentleman Jack, which is based on the former owner Anne Lister. The television series attracted almost six million viewers each week and, as a result, the hall saw a trebling of visitors, leading Calderdale Council to plan an extension of the opening times.

The music room contains a square piano made by John Pohlman; dated 1769, it is one of Pohlman's earliest. The piano is unrestored, though its stand is of a later date.

== Gallery ==
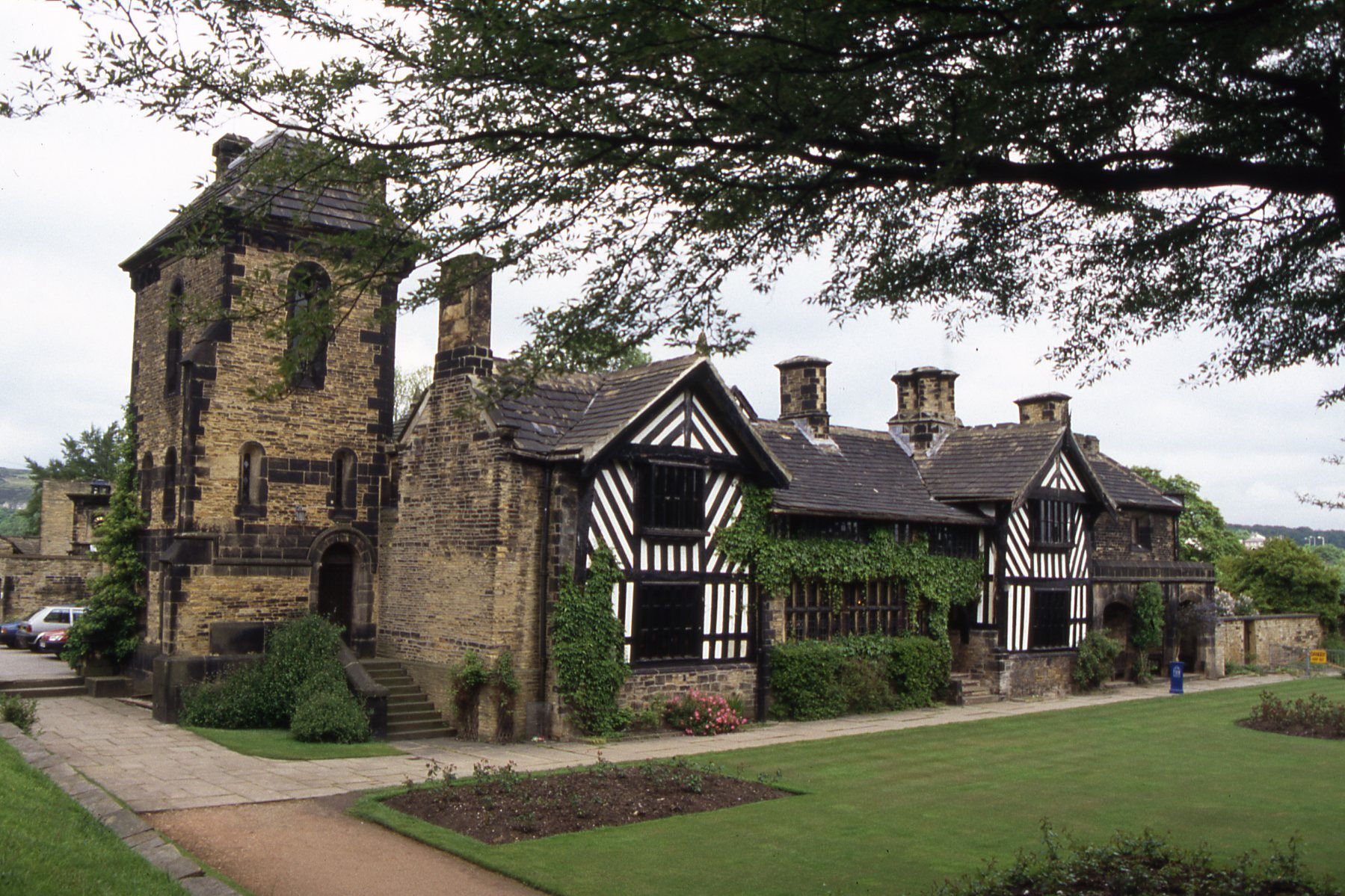
Shibden Hall in May 1995

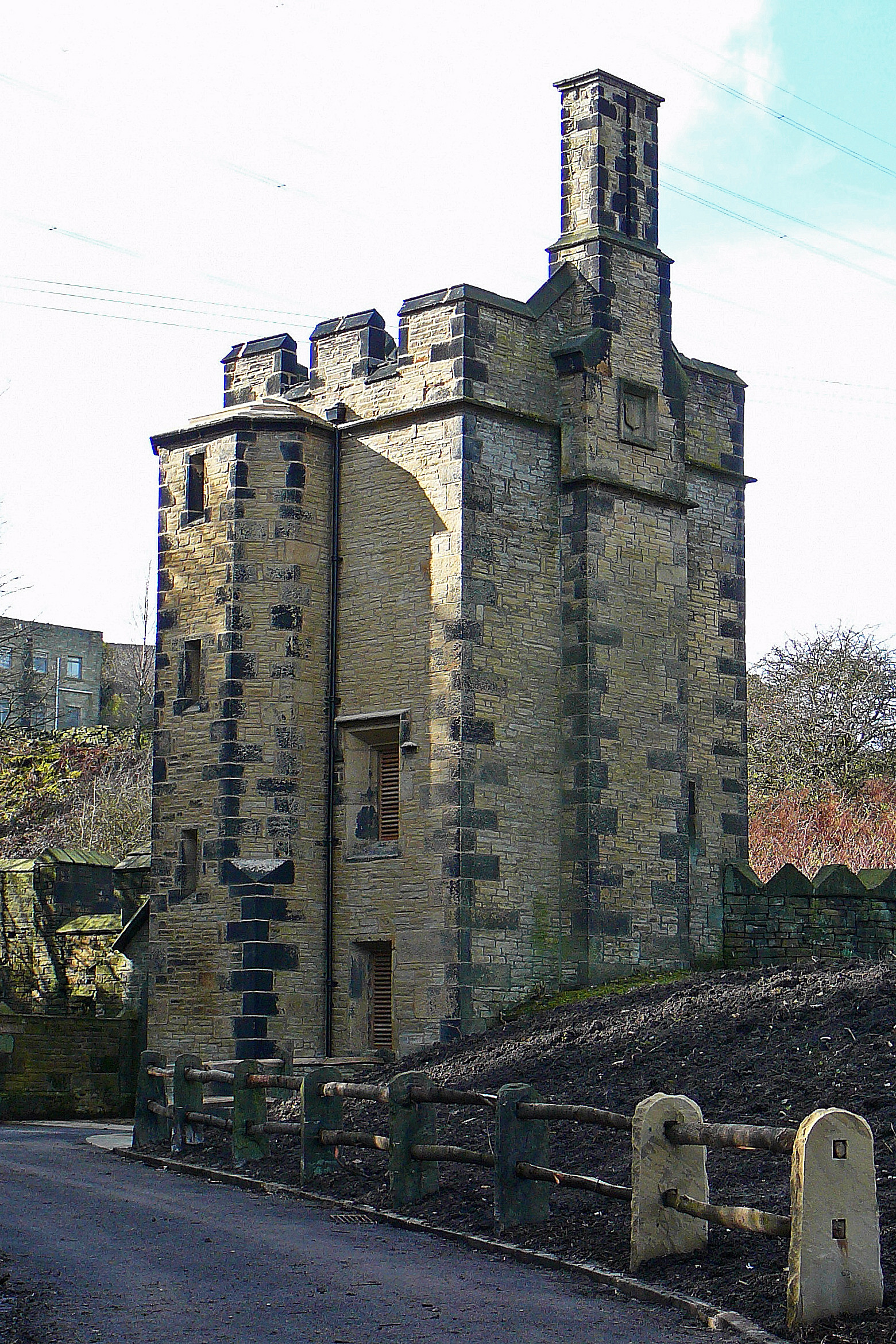
Shibden Hall Gatehouse

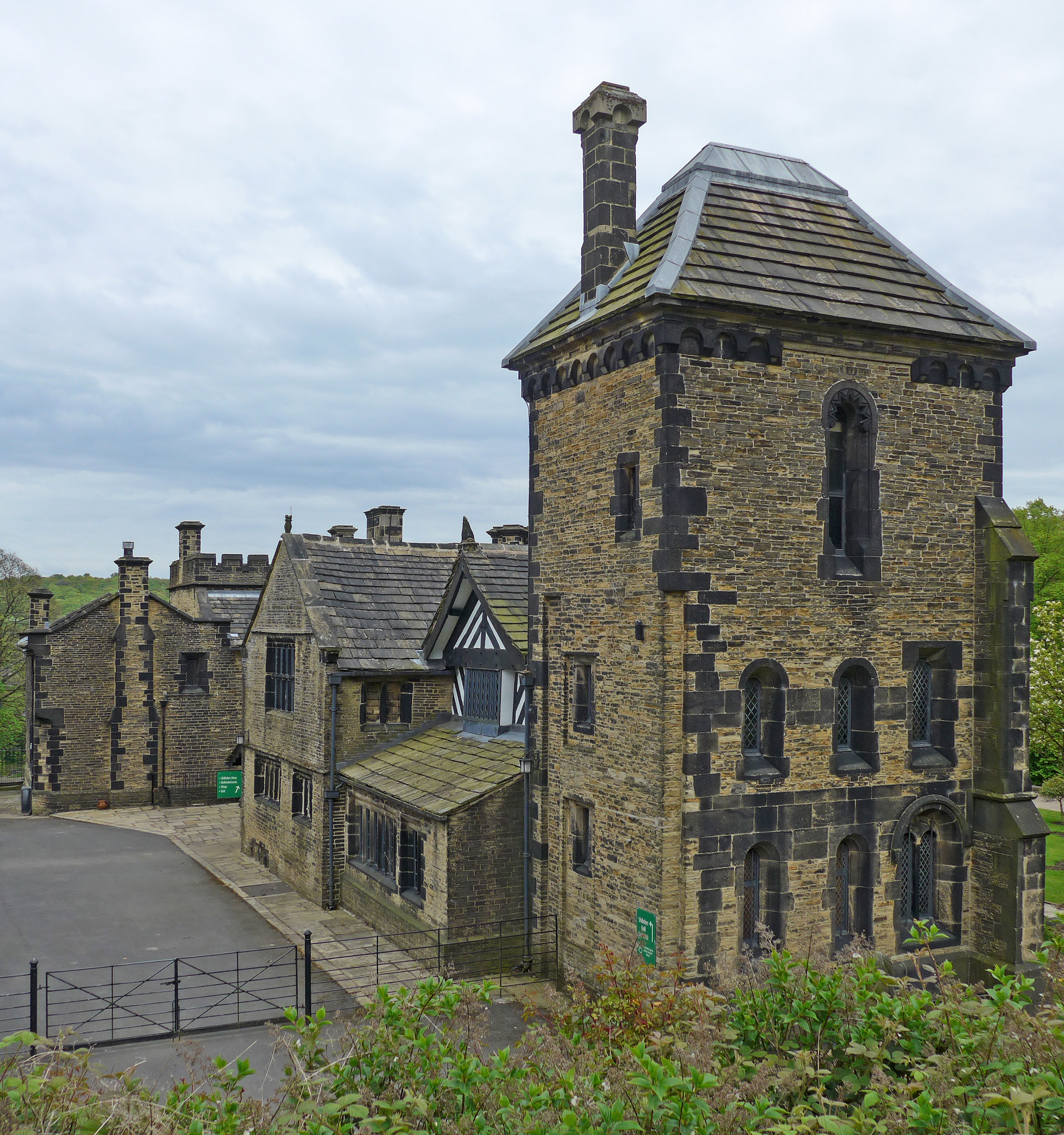
Side view of Shibden Hall with gothic tower in foreground

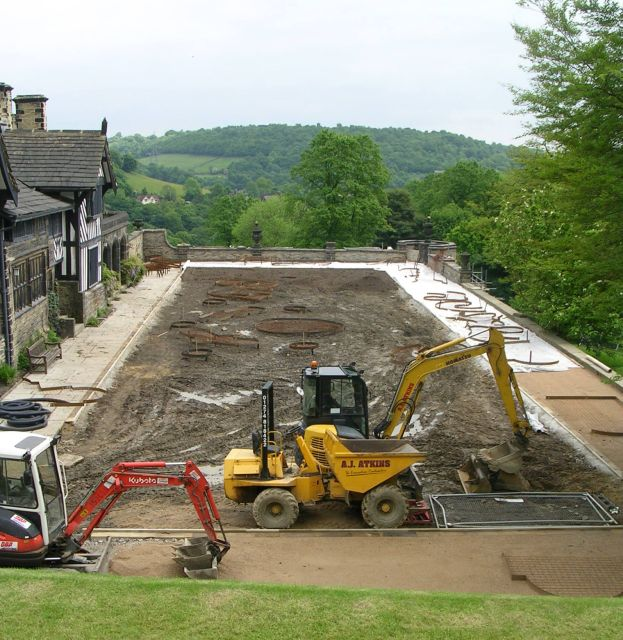
Shibden Hall terrace during refurbishments, May 2008

Shibden Hall in May 2009

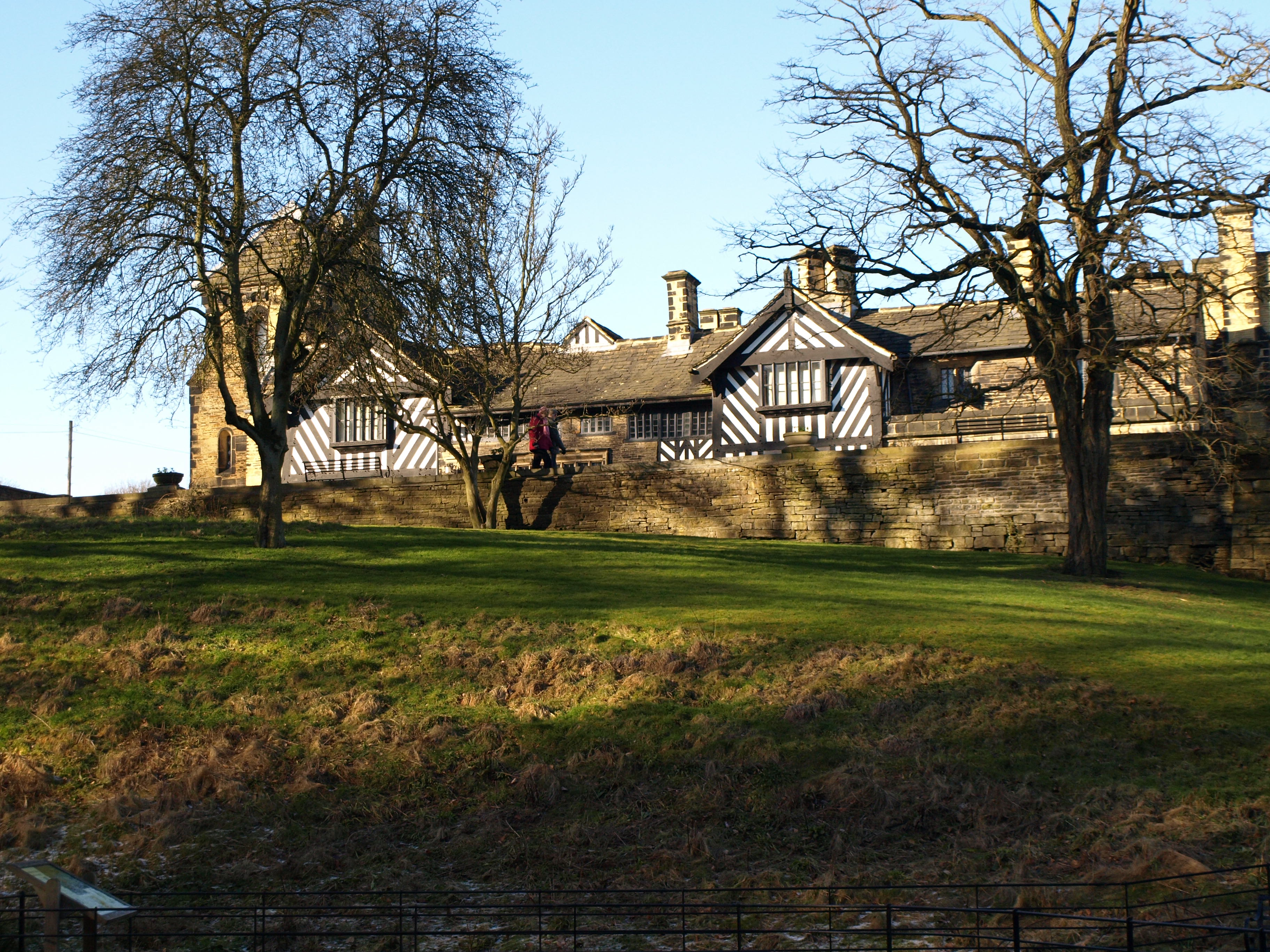
Shibden Hall from the park walkways

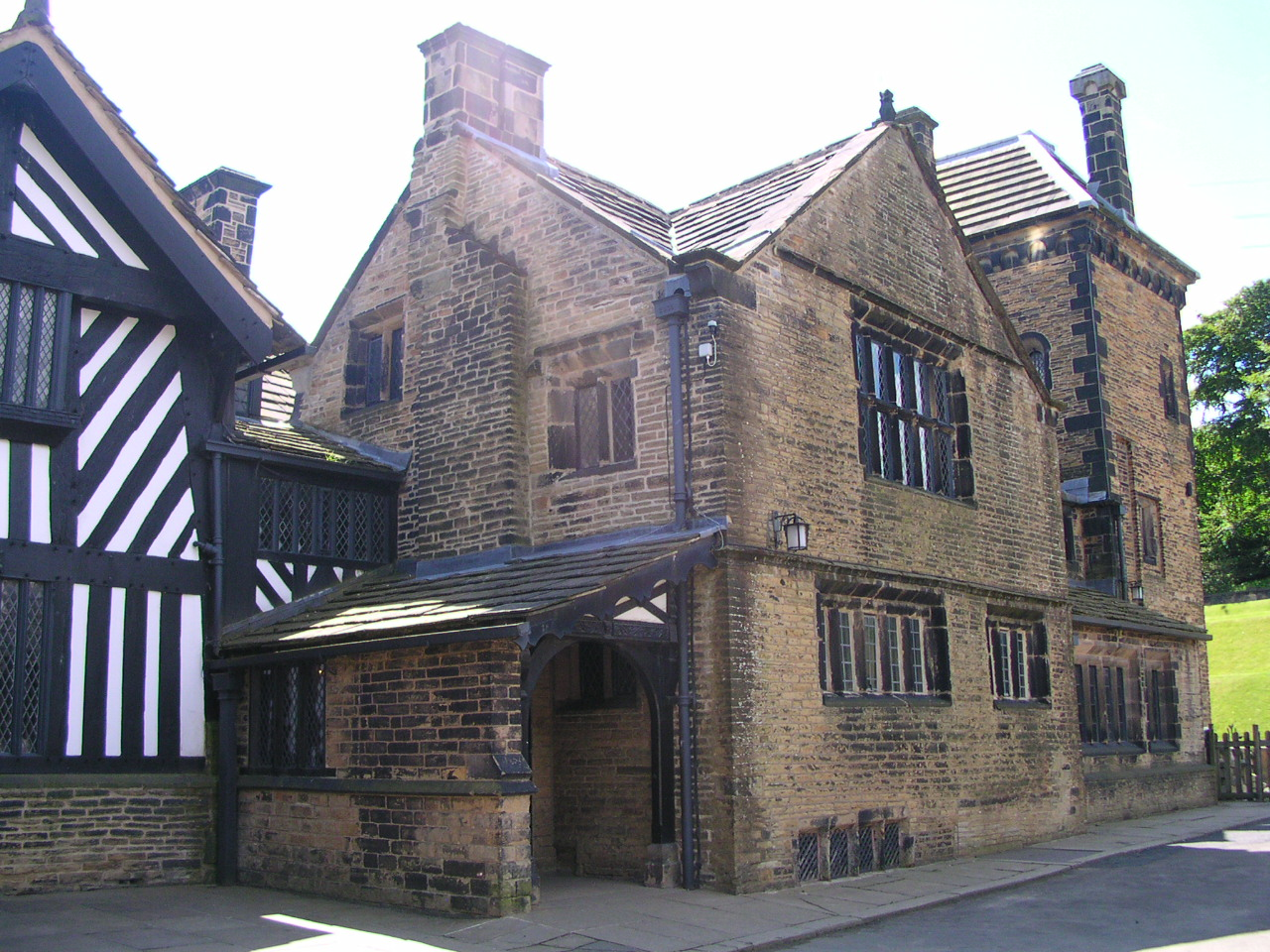
Rear of Shibden Hall

Rear courtyard with stables and outbuildings to the left

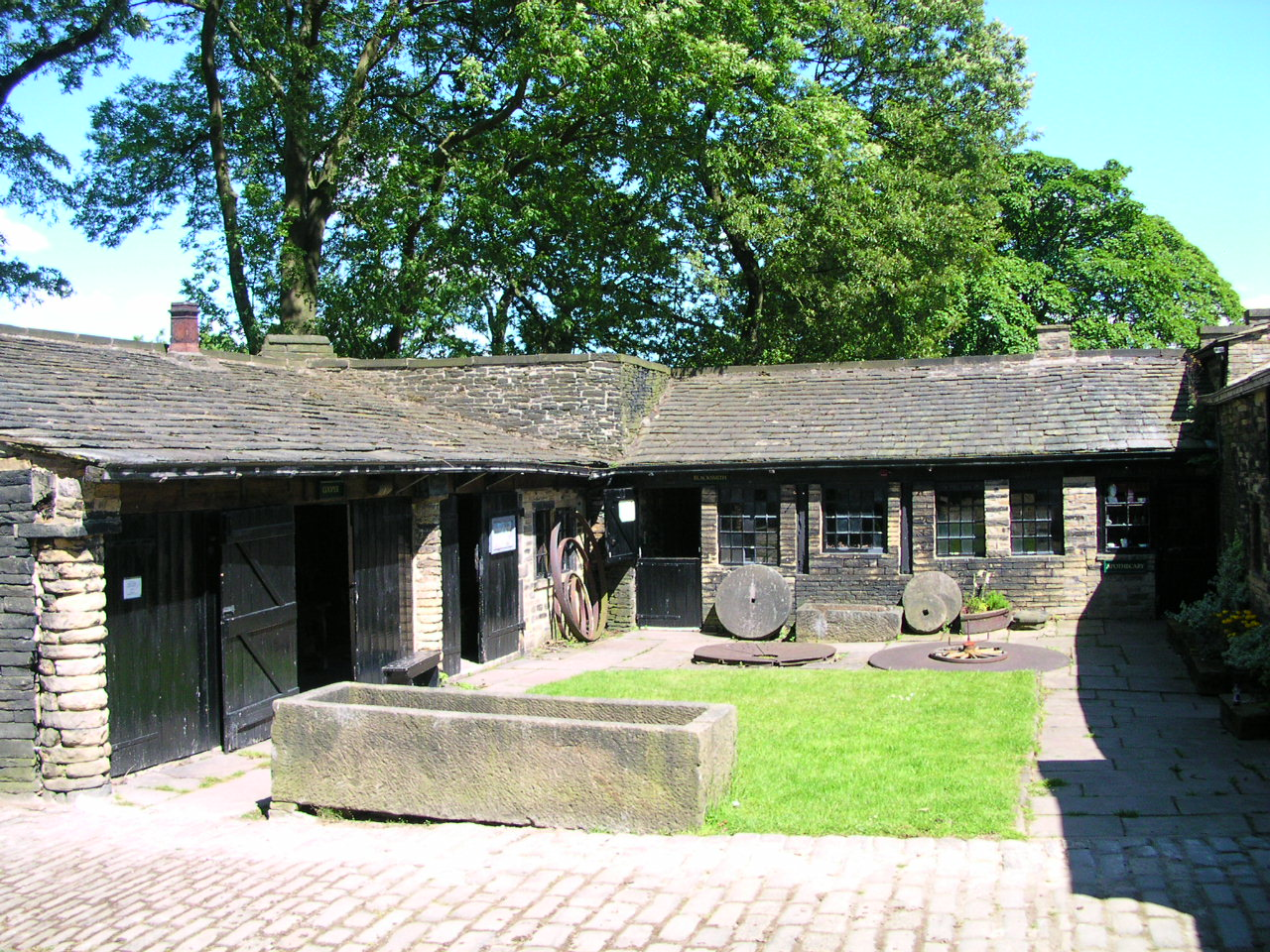
Craft workshops

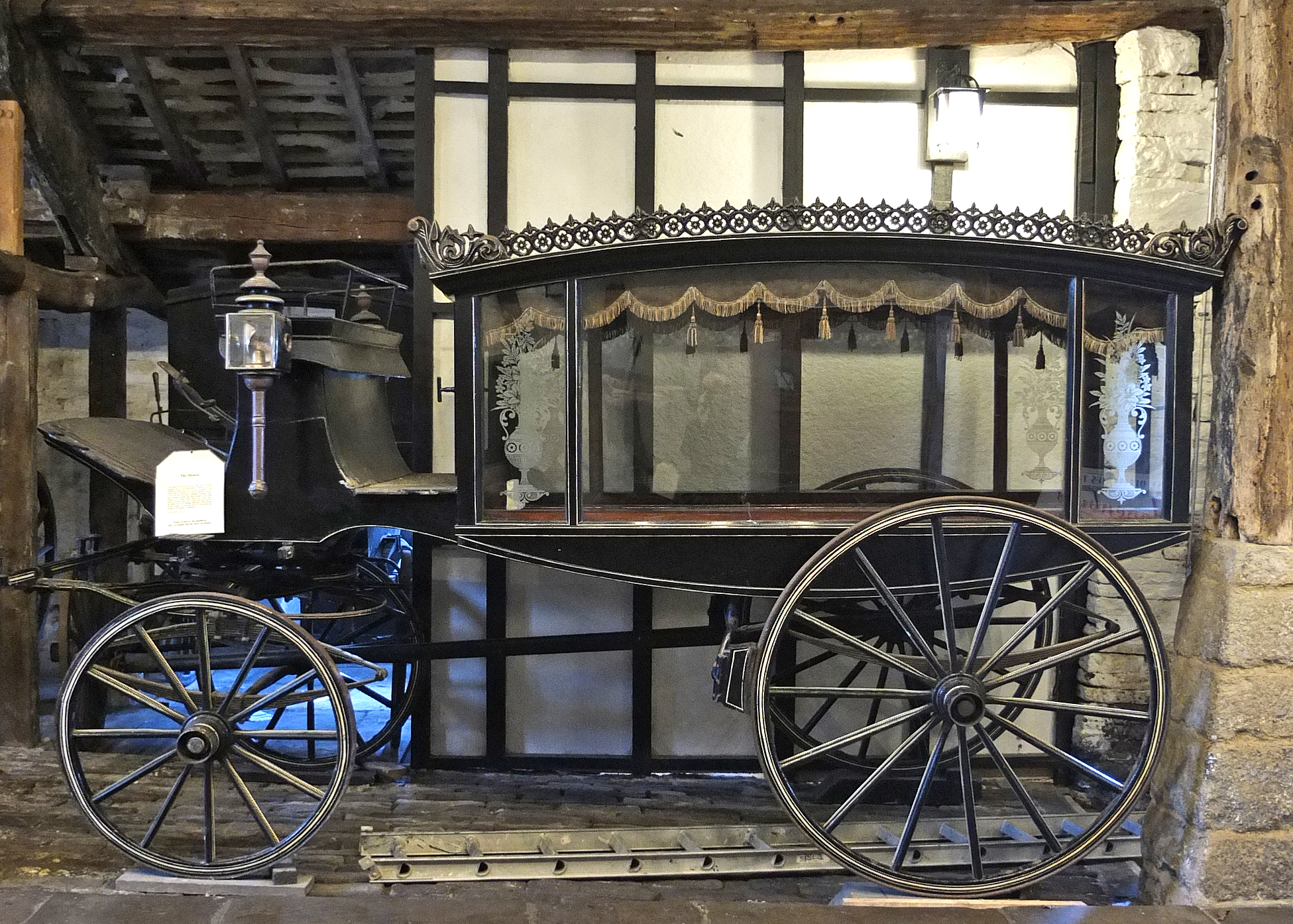
Hearse housed at Shibden Hall

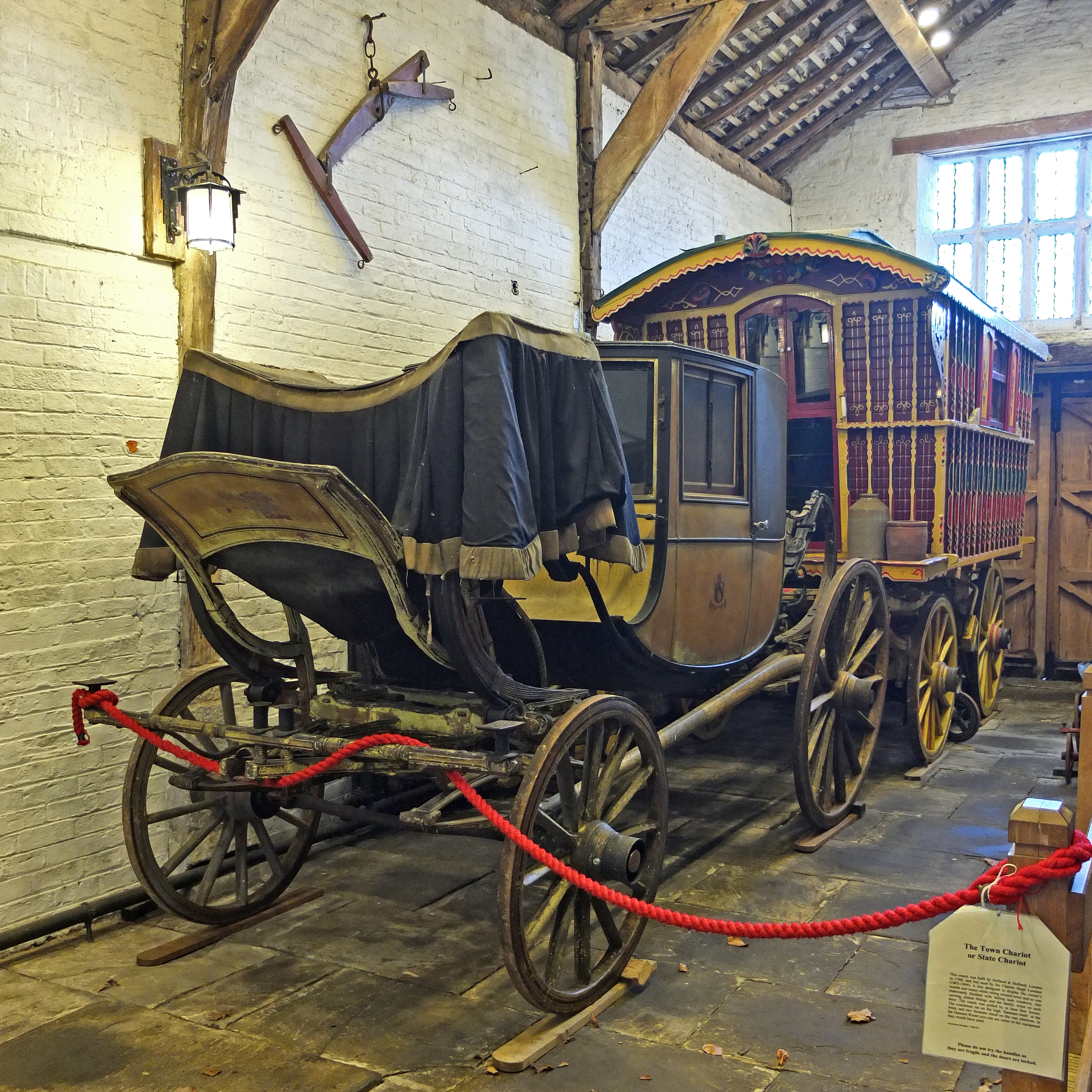
The Town Chariot and the Vardo

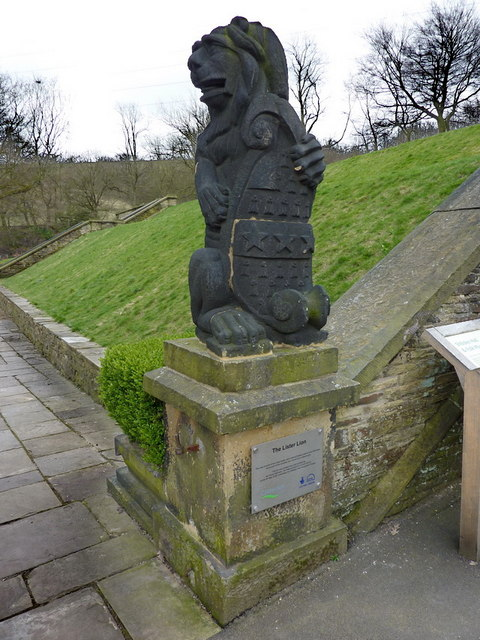
The Lister Lion stone sculpture

== See also ==
- Grade II* listed buildings in Calderdale
- Listed buildings in Northowram
- LGBTQ architectural contributions: Anne Lister's Shibden Hall

== Bibliography ==
- Hanson, T. W. (1934). A Short History of Shibden Hall. County Borough of Halifax/William Patterson Printers. 32pp.
