= Hipperholme =

Village in West Yorkshire, England

Coordinates: 53.725755°N 1.812031°W

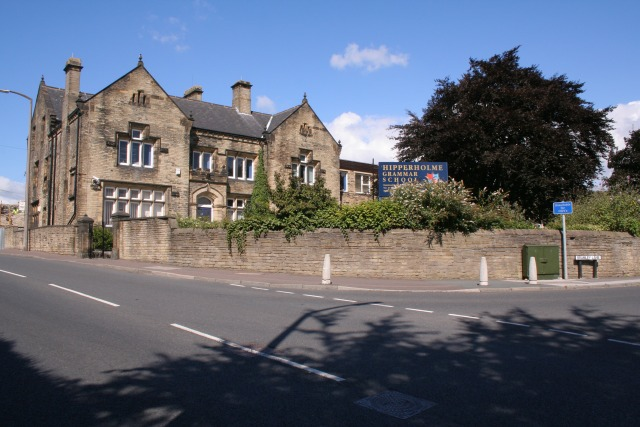
- Hipperholme Grammar School

- Location within West Yorkshire
- OS grid reference: SE125255
- Metropolitan borough: Calderdale
- Metropolitan county: West Yorkshire
- Region: Yorkshire and the Humber
- Country: England
- Sovereign state: United Kingdom
- Post town: HALIFAX
- Postcode district: HX3
- Dialling code: 01422
- Police: West Yorkshire
- Fire: West Yorkshire
- Ambulance: Yorkshire
- UK Parliament: Calder Valley

Hipperholme is a village in West Yorkshire, England, located between the towns of Halifax and Brighouse in the Metropolitan Borough of Calderdale.

== Geography ==
Hipperholme is located at the crossroads of A58 road and A644 road, about 2.5 miles (4.0 km) east of Halifax town centre at a height of about 522 feet (159 m) above sea level (at Christ Church).

Hipperholme lies in the unparished area of the borough of Calderdale, who are responsible for all local government activity in the village and surrounding areas. It lies in the borough ward of Hipperholme and Lightcliffe and the parliamentary constituency of Calder Valley. As a village in an unparished area, there are no formal civil parish boundaries defining Hipperholme, but mapping shows it as adjoining the villages of Southowram and Northowram to the west, Coley to the north, Lightcliffe to the east, and Hove Edge to the south.

== History ==
The name Hipperholme derives from the plural form of the Old English hyper meaning 'osier'.

Hipperholme is mentioned in the Domesday Book both as Hipperholme and as Huperun. Here the king held two carucates (an area of land used for taxation purposes which could notionally be ploughed by an eight-ox team in a season). Historically it was part of the West Riding of Yorkshire. Hipperholme was formerly a township in the parish of Halifax, the township also included nearby Brighouse, Lightcliffe, and Hove Edge. So Hipperholme was historically recorded in parish and gazetteer records under the shorthand abbreviation HipL (representing Hipperholme-cum-Lightcliffe or Hipperholme). It was known as Hipperholme-with-Brighouse in the late 19th century. In 1894 Hipperholme became an urban district, on 31 December 1894 Hipperholme became a civil parish, being formed from the part of the parish of Hipperholme with Brighouse in Hipperholme Urban District, on 1 April 1937 the district was abolished and merged with the Municipal Borough of Brighouse. On 1 April 1937 the parish was abolished and merged with Brighouse. In 1931 the parish had a population of 5383.

== Economy and commerce ==
Traditional industries in Hipperholme were the manufacture of silk and cotton goods, coal mining, quarrying, and tannery. From Joseph Brooke's quarrying firm, founded in 1840 and known for their non-slip paving stones patented in 1898, arose Brookes Chemicals Ltd who initially produced pricric acid for military needs, and later bitumen road coatings. Both stone and chemical works ceased trading in 1969. Most of the Lightcliffe plant was sold in 1969 to Philips, manufacturer of electrical goods, and acquired in 1986 by Crosslee plc, who also produce electric household appliances and are one of the major employers in Calderdale. Following the closure of the factory, the site was allocated for a new residential development, to be called Crosslee Park.

Hipperholme is today a thriving village with many local shops and is home to several pubs including the Hop Monkey at the Whitehall, the Traveller's Inn, the Hare and Hounds, the White Horse, the Halifax Steam Brewery with Cock o' the North Bar.

== Education ==
The local state primary schools are Lightcliffe Church of England School and Cliffe Hill School. Secondary schools are Hipperholme Grammar School, a private school, and Lightcliffe Academy, a state school formerly known as Hipperholme and Lightcliffe, and before that until 1985 as Eastfield Secondary Modern School, which is in Lightcliffe.

== Transport ==
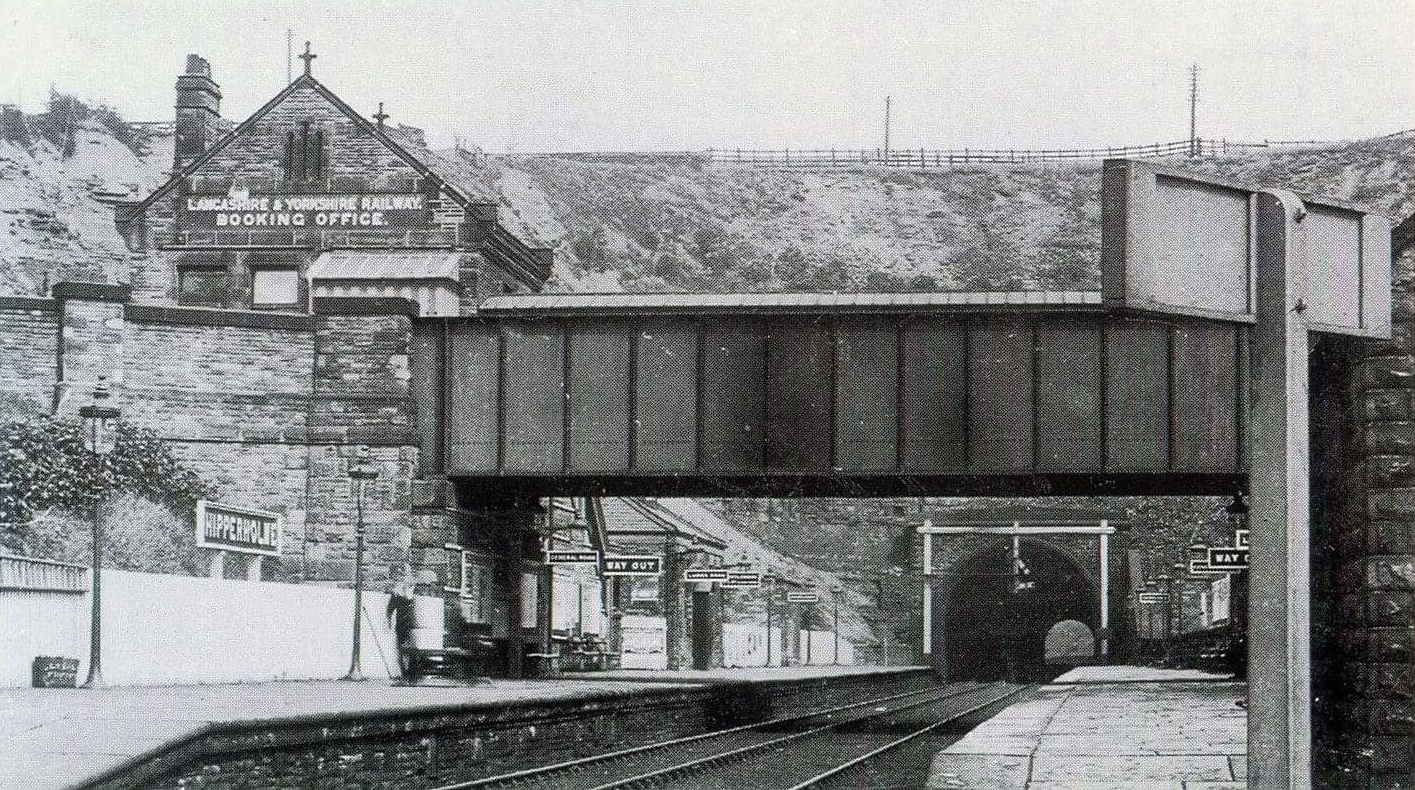
Hipperholme station in 1922

Hipperholme stands at a crossroads. The A58 road connects it with Halifax and the M62 motorway, the A644 road with Brighouse and Queensbury, and the A649 road with Liversedge and the A62 road.

The railway between Bradford and Halifax runs through Hipperholme and neighbouring Lightcliffe. Both villages had stations, but Hipperholme station closed in 1953 and Lightcliffe station in 1965. Today, the nearest railway stations are Halifax and Brighouse.

There are frequent bus routes from Hipperholme to Halifax, Brighouse, Leeds and Huddersfield. Services are run by First West Yorkshire, Arriva Yorkshire and Go Ahead West Yorkshire.

== Culture and community ==
Hipperholme and Lightcliffe's social institutions include the Old Brodleians Rugby Club, Lightcliffe Cricket Club, the Masonic Hall, Lightcliffe Golf Club and the Lightcliffe Club.

== Religious sites ==
St Matthew's Church

Hipperholme is split between two different ecclesiastical parishes of the Church of England, with the northern part in the parish of Coley and the southern part in the parish of Lightcliffe. These parishes are served by the following churches, neither of which is actually in Hipperholme:

- St John the Baptist Church in Coley was built in the early 16th century as a chapel of ease at the instigation of William Thorpe of Hipperholme, enlarged in 1596, 1631, and 1711, extensively renovated on the latter occasion, and replaced by a new building in 1816. The latter was built by William Bradley from Halifax and altered by Hodgson Fowler around 1900. It is a Grade II listed building.
- St Matthew's on Wakefield Road in Lightcliffe was built in 1874 by W. Swindon Barber in the Gothic Revival style and is a Grade II listed structure, as is the nearby tower of its predecessor building which was built by William Mallinson and dates from 1775.

Christ Church, at the crossroads of Brighouse Road and Leeds Road, was built as the Hipperholme Wesleyan Methodist Chapel, starting in 1870, by William Ives in Geometric Gothic style. It was renovated in 1888. After amalgamation with Lightcliffe United Reformed Church in 2003 it obtained its present name. It serves members of the United Reformed Church and the Methodist Church in a local ecumenical partnership.

== See also ==
- Listed buildings in Hipperholme and Lightcliffe
