= Bailiff Bridge =

Village in West Yorkshire, England

Coordinates: 53.7167°N 1.7817°W

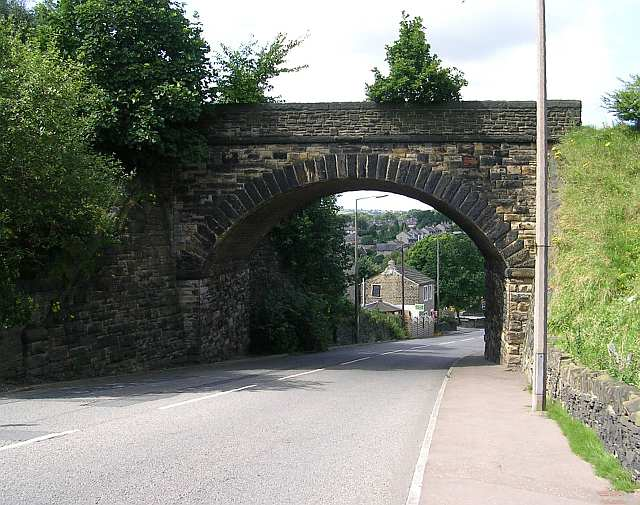

- Location within West Yorkshire
- OS grid reference: SE145245
- Metropolitan borough: Calderdale
- Metropolitan county: West Yorkshire
- Region: Yorkshire and the Humber
- Country: England
- Sovereign state: United Kingdom
- Post town: BRIGHOUSE
- Postcode district: HD6
- Dialling code: 01484
- Police: West Yorkshire
- Fire: West Yorkshire
- Ambulance: Yorkshire
- UK Parliament: Calder Valley

Bailiff Bridge is a village 1.5 miles (2.4 km) north from Brighouse, West Yorkshire, England, and is 5 miles (8 km) from Huddersfield and 7 miles (11 km) from Bradford.

== Parish ==
Bailiff Bridge lies in the unparished area of the borough of Calderdale, who are responsible for all local government activity in the village and surrounding areas. It lies in the borough ward of Hipperholme and Lightcliffe and the parliamentary constituency of Calder Valley. As a village in an unparished area, there are no formal civil parish boundaries defining Bailiff Bridge, but mapping shows it as adjoining the settlements of Lightcliffe to the west, and Brighouse to the south.

== Transport ==
The village is centred on the A649 and A641 roads which connect it to nearby towns and cities.

The village was served by Bailiff Bridge railway station on the Pickle Bridge Line between 1881 and 1917.

Buses are run by Arriva Yorkshire and First Huddersfield.

== Employment ==
One of the main employers in the village was Firth's Carpets.

== Notable people ==
Notable residents from the village are Danny and Richard McNamara from the band Embrace, who grew up in the village.

== See also ==
- Listed buildings in Hipperholme and Lightcliffe
