= Electoral history of Liz Truss =

Elections featuring UK Prime Minister

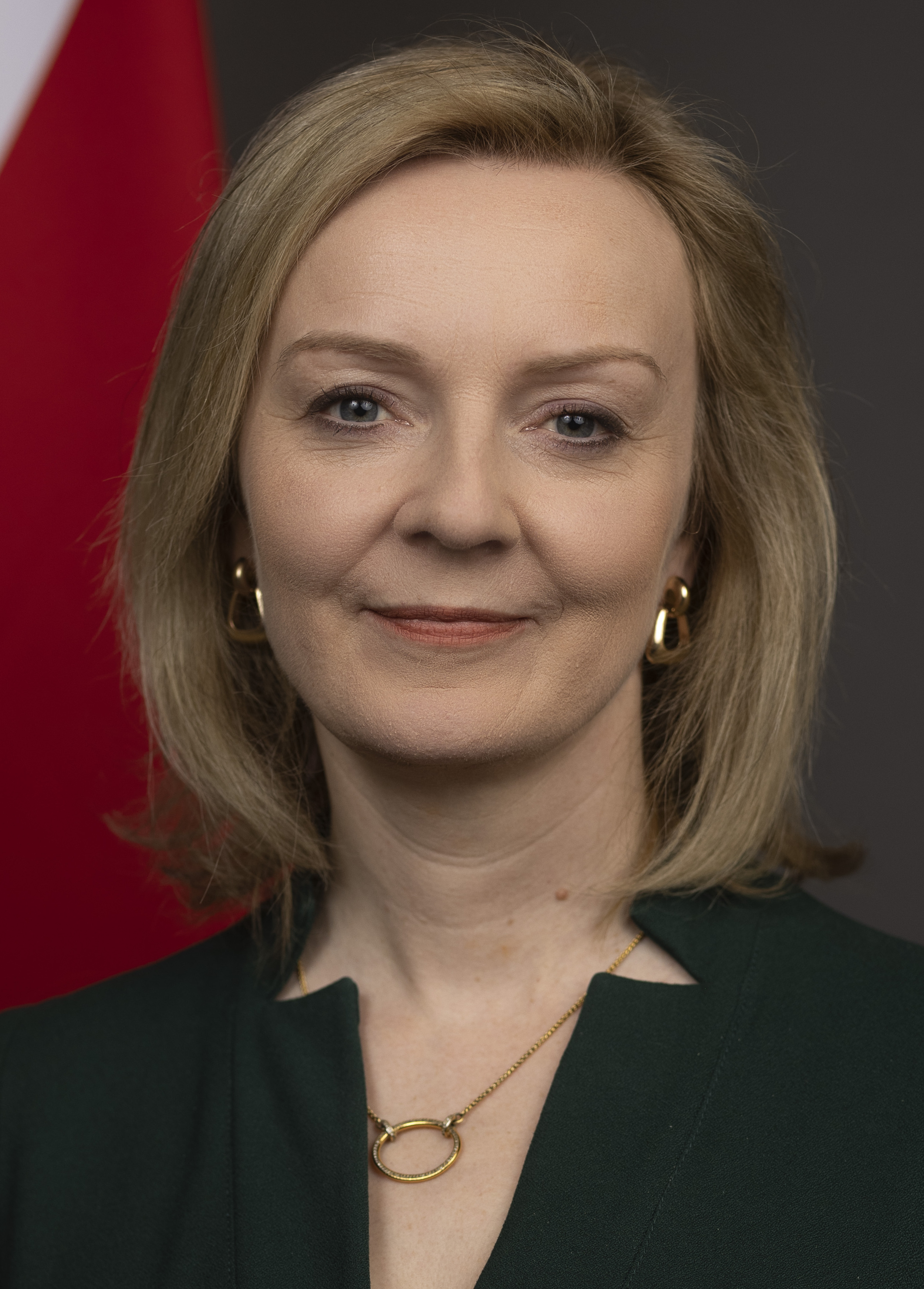
Official portrait of Liz Truss as foreign secretary

This is a summary of the electoral history of Liz Truss, the former member of parliament for South West Norfolk who served from 2010 to 2024. She also served as Leader of the Conservative Party and Prime Minister of the United Kingdom from September to October 2022, making her the shortest-serving prime minister in history; Truss previously served as foreign secretary from 2021 to 2022.

== Council elections ==
=== 1998 Greenwich London Borough Council election, Vanbrugh ===
Vanbrugh (2)
Party	Candidate	Votes	%	±%
Labour	Alexander H.W. Grant	979	54.42	▲5.10
Labour	David J.G. Picton^{†} (Note: Picton was a sitting councillor representing the Charlton ward)	899		
Conservative	Douglas B. Ellison	537	29.90	▲6.05
Conservative	Elizabeth M. Truss	495		
Liberal Democrats	Shirley G. Broad	311	15.68	▼1.93
Liberal Democrats	David Richardson	230		
Registered electors		4,853		▲150
Turnout		1,820	37.50	▼10.04
Rejected ballots		8	0.44	▲0.22
Labour hold				
Labour hold				

=== 2002 Greenwich London Borough Council election, Blackheath Westcombe ===
Blackheath Westcombe (3)
Party	Candidate	Votes	%	±%
Labour	Alexander H.W. Grant	1,776	42.0	
Labour	Annie P. Keys	1,539		
Conservative	Hugh R. Harris	1,507	35.7	
Labour	Matthew A.V. Stiles	1,503		
Conservative	Geoffrey E. Brighty	1,491		
Conservative	Elizabeth M. Truss	1,360		
Liberal Democrats	Michael W. Smart	798	18.9	
UKIP	Jeremy C. Elms	145	3.4	
Turnout		3,662	39.1	
Labour win (new seat)				
Labour win (new seat)				
Conservative win (new seat)				

=== 2006 Greenwich London Borough Council election, Eltham South ===
Eltham South (3)
Party	Candidate	Votes	%	±%
Conservative	Eileen Glover	1,668	44.2	
Conservative	Peter King	1,611		
Conservative	Liz Truss	1,443		
Liberal Democrats	Mark Pattenden	1,386	36.7	
Liberal Democrats	Michael Lewis	1,284		
Liberal Democrats	Elliot Shubert	1,168		
Labour	John Littlefield	720	19.1	
Labour	Terence Malone	693		
Labour	John Twidale	667		
Turnout			40.0	
Conservative hold		Swing		
Conservative hold		Swing		
Conservative gain from Liberal Democrats		Swing		

== Parliamentary elections ==
=== 2001 general election, Hemsworth ===
General election 2001: Hemsworth
Party	Candidate	Votes	%	±%
Labour	Jon Trickett	23,036	65.4	−5.2
Conservative	Liz Truss	7,400	21.0	+3.2
Liberal Democrats	Ed Waller	3,990	11.3	+2.4
Socialist Labour	Paul Turek	801	2.3	New
Majority		15,636	44.4	−8.4
Turnout		35,227	51.8	−16.1
Labour hold		Swing	−4.2	

=== 2005 general election, Calder Valley ===
General election 2005: Calder Valley
Party	Candidate	Votes	%	±%
Labour	Christine McCafferty	18,426	38.6	−4.1
Conservative	Liz Truss	17,059	35.7	−0.5
Liberal Democrats	Liz Ingleton	9,027	18.9	+2.9
BNP	John Gregory	1,887	4.0	N/A
Green	Paul Palmer	1,371	2.9	+0.7
Majority		1,367	2.9	−3.6
Turnout		47,770	67.0	+4.0
Labour hold		Swing	−1.8	

=== 2010 general election, South West Norfolk ===
General election 2010: South West Norfolk
Party	Candidate	Votes	%	±%
Conservative	Liz Truss	23,753	48.3	
Liberal Democrats	Stephen Gordon	10,613	21.6	
Labour	Peter Smith	9,119	18.6	
UKIP	Kay Hipsey	3,061	6.2	
BNP	Dennis Pearce	1,774	3.6	
Green	Lori Allen	830	1.7	
Majority		13,140	26.7	
Turnout		49,150	66.2	
Conservative hold		Swing		

=== 2015 general election, South West Norfolk ===
General election 2015: South West Norfolk
Party	Candidate	Votes	%	±%
Conservative	Liz Truss	25,515	50.9	+2.6
UKIP	Paul Smyth	11,654	23.3	+17.1
Labour	Peter Smith	8,649	17.3	−1.3
Liberal Democrats	Rupert Moss-Eccard	2,217	4.4	−17.2
Green	Sandra Walmsley	2,075	4.1	+2.4
Majority		13,861	27.6	+0.9
Turnout		50,110	65.1	−1.1
Conservative hold		Swing	−7.2	

=== 2017 general election, South West Norfolk ===
General election 2017: South West Norfolk
Party	Candidate	Votes	%	±%
Conservative	Liz Truss	32,894	62.8	+11.9
Labour	Peter Smith	14,582	27.8	+10.5
UKIP	David Williams	2,575	4.9	−18.4
Liberal Democrats	Stephen Gordon	2,365	4.5	+0.1
Majority		18,312	35.0	+7.4
Turnout		52,416	67.3	+2.2
Conservative hold		Swing	+0.7	

=== 2019 general election, South West Norfolk ===
General election 2019: South West Norfolk
Party	Candidate	Votes	%	±%
Conservative	Liz Truss	35,507	69.0	+6.2
Labour	Emily Blake	9,312	18.1	−9.7
Liberal Democrats	Josie Ratcliffe	4,166	8.1	+3.6
Green	Pallavi Devulapalli	1,645	3.2	N/A
Monster Raving Loony	Earl Elvis of Outwell	836	1.6	N/A
Majority		26,195	50.9	+15.9
Turnout		51,466	65.6	−1.7
Conservative hold		Swing	+8.0	

=== 2024 general election, South West Norfolk ===
General election 2024: South West Norfolk
Party	Candidate	Votes	%	±%
Labour	Terry Jermy	11,847	26.7	+8.4
Conservative	Liz Truss	11,217	25.3	−43.4
Reform	Toby McKenzie	9,958	22.4	N/A
Independent	James Bagge	6,282	14.2	N/A
Liberal Democrats	Josie Ratcliffe	2,618	5.9	−2.4
Green	Pallavi Devulapalli	1,838	4.1	+1.1
Monster Raving Loony	Earl Elvis of East Anglia	338	0.8	−0.9
Heritage	Gary Conway	160	0.4	N/A
Communist	Lorraine Douglas	77	0.2	N/A
Majority		630	1.4	
Turnout		44,335	59.3	−7.0
Labour gain from Conservative		Swing	+25.8	

== 2022 Conservative Party leadership election ==
Candidate	MPs' 1st ballot: 13 July 2022		MPs' 2nd ballot: 14 July 2022			MPs' 3rd ballot: 18 July 2022			MPs' 4th ballot: 19 July 2022			MPs' 5th ballot: 20 July 2022			Members' vote 22 July to 2 September 2022		
Candidate	Votes	%	Votes	±	%	Votes	±	%	Votes	±	%	Votes	±	%	Votes	%	% Votes cast
Liz Truss	50	14.0	64	+14	17.9	71	+7	19.8	86	+15	24.1	113	+27	31.6	81,326	47.2	57.4
Rishi Sunak	88	24.6	101	+13	28.2	115	+14	32.1	118	+3	33.1	137	+19	38.3	60,399	35.0	42.6
Penny Mordaunt	67	18.7	83	+16	23.2	82	−1	22.9	92	+10	25.8	105	+13	29.3	Eliminated		
Kemi Badenoch	40	11.2	49	+9	13.7	58	+9	16.2	59	+1	16.5	Eliminated					
Tom Tugendhat	37	10.3	32	−5	8.9	31	−1	8.7	Eliminated								
Suella Braverman	32	8.9	27	−5	7.5	Eliminated											
Nadhim Zahawi	25	7.0	Eliminated														
Jeremy Hunt	18	5.0	Eliminated														
Votes cast (Note: Due to rounding errors the sum of percentages may deviate.)	357	99.7	356	−1	99.4	357	+1	99.7	355	−2	99.4	355	0	99.2	141,725	82.2	100
Spoilt ballots	0	0.0	0	0	0.0	0	0	0.0	1	+1	0.3	2	+1	0.6	654	0.4	
Abstentions	1	0.3	2	+1	0.6	1	−1	0.3	1	0	0.3	1	0	0.3	30,058	17.4	
Registered voters	358	100.0	358	0	100.0	358	0	100.0	357	−1	100.0	358	+1	100.0	172,437	100.0	
