= Coley, West Yorkshire =

Village in West Yorkshire, England

Coordinates: 53.7389°N 1.8130°W

Coley
- St John the Baptist Church, Coley

- Location within West Yorkshire
- Metropolitan borough: Calderdale
- Metropolitan county: West Yorkshire
- Region: Yorkshire and the Humber
- Country: England
- Sovereign state: United Kingdom
- Police: West Yorkshire
- Fire: West Yorkshire
- Ambulance: Yorkshire
- UK Parliament: Calder Valley

Coley is a village that is situated some 3.5 kilometres (2.2 mi) north-east of the town of Halifax in the English county of West Yorkshire.

Coley lies in the unparished area of the borough of Calderdale, who are responsible for all local government activity in the village and surrounding areas. It lies in the borough ward of Hipperholme and Lightcliffe and the parliamentary constituency of Calder Valley. As a village in an unparished area, there are no formal civil parish boundaries defining Coley, but mapping shows it as adjoining the villages of Northowram to the west, Shelf to the north, Norwood Green to the east, and Hipperholme to the south.

Coley first appeared in the Wakefield court rolls in 1277. Once part of the parish of Halifax, it became an ecclesiastical parish in 1749. The parish church is St John the Baptist, with records suggesting a church on the site as early as 1513. The present building was constructed in 1816, and is a grade II listed building. Situated on a hilltop location at 210 metres (690 ft) amsl, the church tower stands as a landmark visible for miles around. The ecclesiastical parish of Coley is rather larger than the village, and includes Norwood Green and parts of Hipperholme.

Coley is also the location of a number of ancient halls. These include Coley Hall, built on the site of a medieval priory dating back to 1277, and itself built between 1572 and 1640. Wynteredge Hall is even older, with parts of the building believed to date from 1371, although it was rebuilt in the 1640s. Both halls and associated buildings are grade II listed, whilst the entrance arch to Coley Hall has the rarer grade II* listing.

Go Ahead West Yorkshire operates bus service 571, from Halifax to Shelf, which passes through Coley once an hour in each direction on weekdays, and less frequently on Sundays and evenings. The nearest railway station is Halifax.

== See also ==
- Listed buildings in Hipperholme and Lightcliffe
