= Hipperholme and Lightcliffe =

Electoral ward in Calderdale, West Yorkshire, England

Coordinates: 53.72873°N 1.79787°W

Hipperholme and Lightcliffe Ward
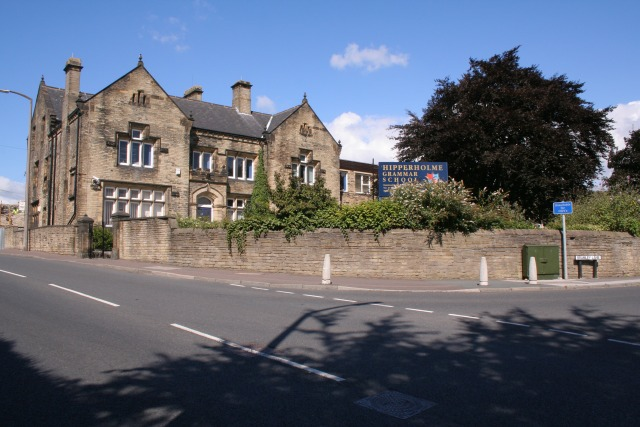
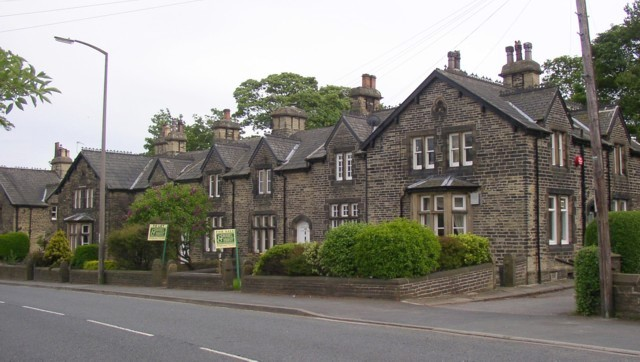
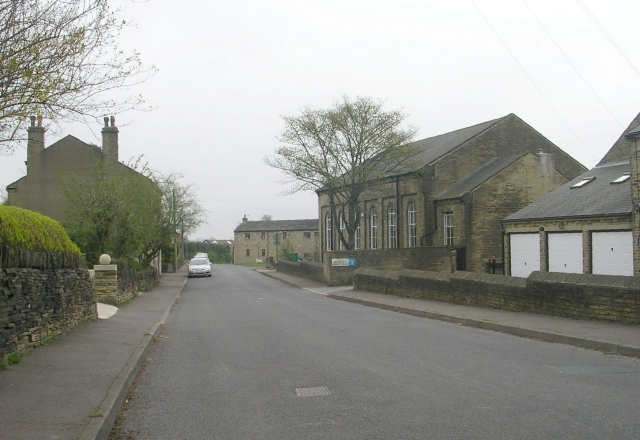
- Clockwise from top left: Hipperholme Grammar School, Houses in Lightcliffe, St John the Baptist Church in Coley and Village Street in Norwood Green

- Location within West Yorkshire
- Area: 10.11 km^{2} (3.90 sq mi)
- Population: 11,650
  - Density: 1,152/km^{2} (2,980/sq mi)
- OS grid reference: SE1326
- Metropolitan borough: Calderdale
- Metropolitan county: West Yorkshire
- Region: Yorkshire and the Humber
- Country: England
- Sovereign state: United Kingdom
- Police: West Yorkshire
- Fire: West Yorkshire
- Ambulance: Yorkshire
- UK Parliament: Calder Valley

Hipperholme and Lightcliffe is an electoral ward of the Metropolitan Borough of Calderdale, in the English county of West Yorkshire.

Hipperholme and Lightcliffe lies to the east of the town of Halifax, on the border of the borough of Calderdale with the City of Bradford. It comprises the settlements of Bailiff Bridge, Coley, Hipperholme, Hove Edge, Lightcliffe and Norwood Green, together with the surrounding and intermediate countryside. The whole of the ward is unparished, and is within the Calder Valley parliamentary constituency

In the UK Census of 2021, the ward had an area of 10.11 square kilometres (3.90 sq mi) and there were 11,650 people living there. Of these, 20.7% were under 15 and 21.1% were 65 and over; 94.8% classified themselves as White, 2.0% as Asian, and 0.5% as Black; 3.7% were born outside the UK.

The ward elects three councillors to Calderdale Council. The ward councillors are currently Joe Atkinson, David Kirton and George Robinson, all of whom are members of the Conservative party.

== See also ==
- Listed buildings in Hipperholme and Lightcliffe
