= Norwood Green, West Yorkshire =

Village in West Yorkshire, England

Coordinates: 53.7396°N 1.7919°W

Norwood Green
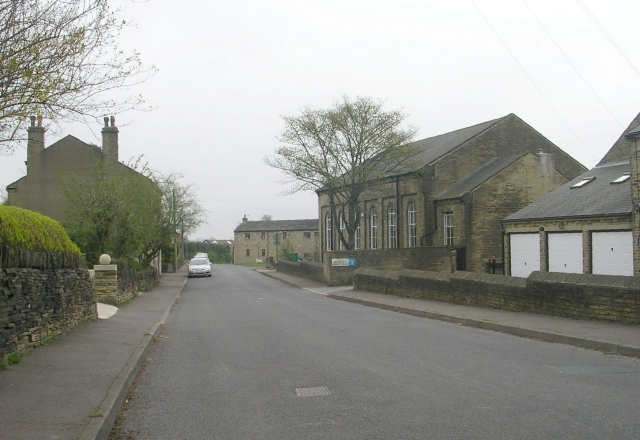
- Village Street

- Location within West Yorkshire
- OS grid reference: SE1326
- Metropolitan borough: Calderdale
- Metropolitan county: West Yorkshire
- Region: Yorkshire and the Humber
- Country: England
- Sovereign state: United Kingdom
- Post town: Halifax
- Postcode district: HX3
- Police: West Yorkshire
- Fire: West Yorkshire
- Ambulance: Yorkshire

Norwood Green is a village that is situated some 5 kilometres (3.1 mi) east-north-east of the town of Halifax in the English county of West Yorkshire.

Norwood Green lies in the unparished area of the borough of Calderdale, who are responsible for all local government activity in the village and surrounding areas. It lies in the borough ward of Hipperholme and Lightcliffe and the parliamentary constituency of Calder Valley. As a village in an unparished area, there are no formal civil parish boundaries defining Norwood Green, but mapping shows it as adjoining Lightcliffe to the south, Coley to the west, and the Bradford areas of Buttershaw, Low Moor and Wyke to the north and east.

Norwood Green is part of the ecclesiastical parish of Coley, and the parish church is St John the Baptist in the village of Coley. The village has a community interest company, the Norwood Green Better Place CIC, whose purpose is "to support the community in making Norwood Green a better place to live".

Judy Woods, one of Yorkshire's largest areas of beech woodland, separates Norwood Green from Low Moor and Wyke. The area, which is now a local nature reserve, was heavily mined for coal and ironstone in the 18th and early 19th century, and remains of bell pits can still be found amongst the trees.

Norwood Green was once served by Wyke and Norwood Green railway station on the Calder Valley line, but that station closed in 1953 and today the nearest station is Halifax. South Pennine Community Transport operate bus route 547, which links Norwood Green to Halifax three times a day on weekdays.

== See also ==
- Listed buildings in Hipperholme and Lightcliffe
