= Hipperholme railway station =

Former railway station in West Yorkshire, England

Hipperholme
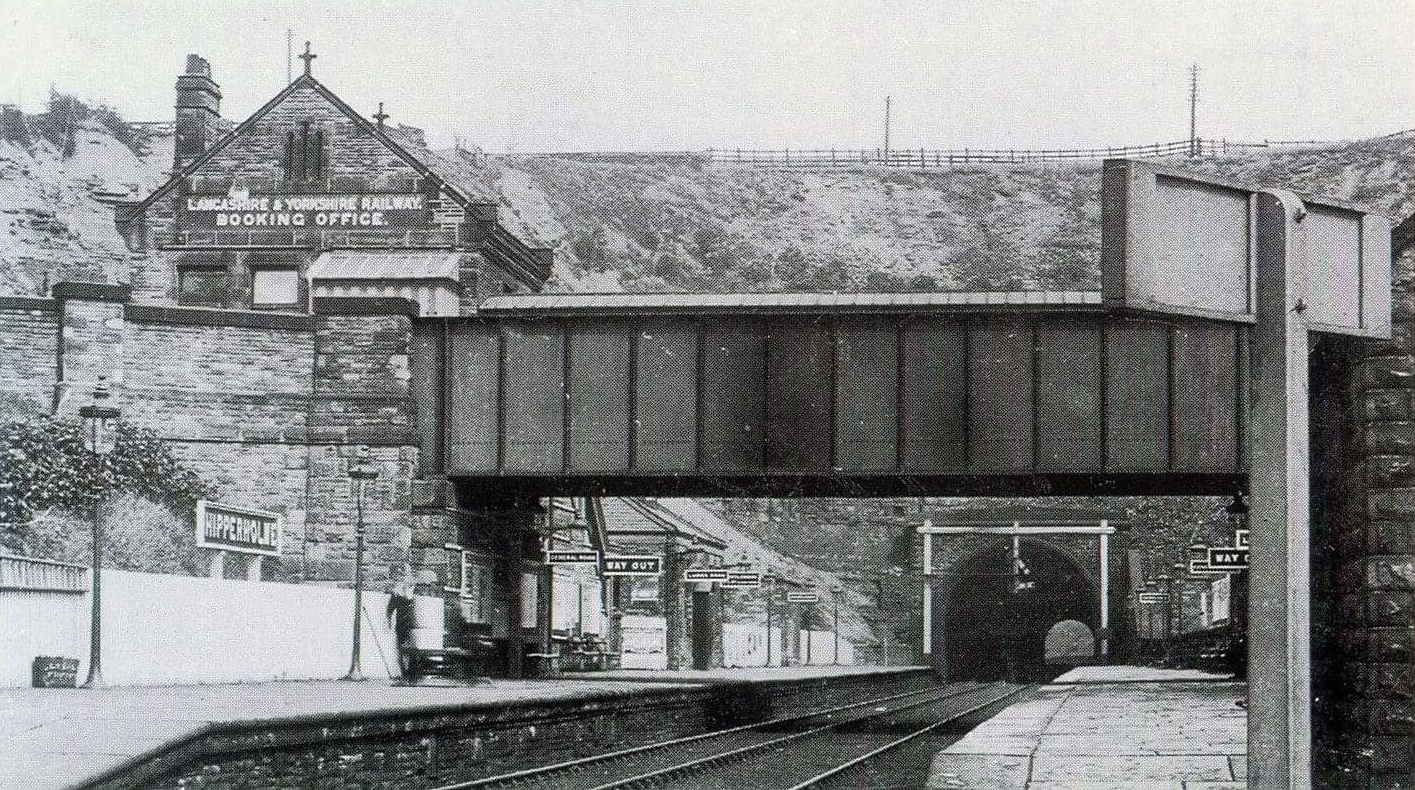
- A photograph of the station pre-grouping

General information
- Location: Hipperholme, Calderdale; England
- Coordinates: 53.725°N 1.817°W
- Grid reference: SE121254
- Platforms: 2

Other information
- Status: Disused

History
- Original company: Lancashire and Yorkshire Railway
- Pre-grouping: London and North Western Railway
- Post-grouping: London, Midland and Scottish Railway

Key dates
- 17 August 1850: opened
- 8 June 1953: closed (passenger)
- 1966: closed (goods)
Location

Hipperholme railway station served the village of Hipperholme in West Yorkshire, England.

== History ==
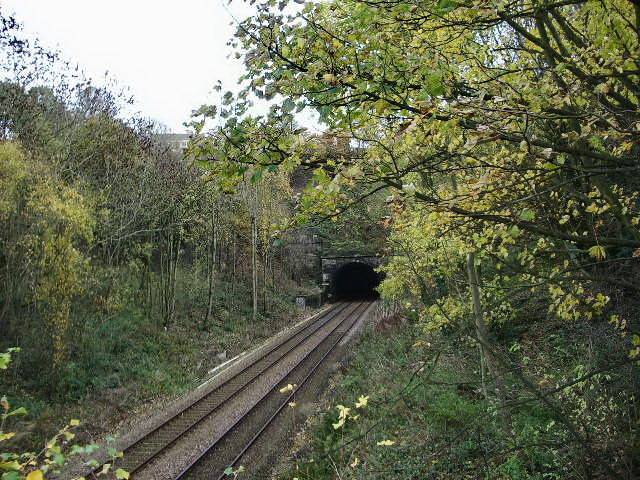
Site of Hipperholme railway station. The platforms stretched all the way to the tunnel mouth.

Hipperholme railway station was opened by the Lancashire and Yorkshire Railway on 17 August 1850. The station closed to passengers on 8 June 1953 and to goods in 1966. A campaign is under way to re-open the closed station or to have a new one built in the area to alleviate congestion in the Hipperholme area. In August 2018, as part of a call for new stations on the Caldervale Line it was proposed that Hipperholme could reopen.

Preceding station	Disused railways	Following station
Halifax	L&Y; Caldervale line	Lightcliffe
