= Listed buildings in Hipperholme and Lightcliffe =

The ward of Hipperholme and Lightcliffe in the metropolitan borough of Calderdale, West Yorkshire, England, consists of the villages of Hipperholme and Lightcliffe together with the surrounding area. The ward contains 71 listed buildings that are recorded in the National Heritage List for England. Of these, three are at Grade II*, the middle of the three grades, and the others are at Grade II, the lowest grade. In addition to the villages of Hipperholme and Lightcliffe, the ward contains smaller settlements, including Bailiff Bridge, Coley, Hove Edge, and Norwood Green, and is otherwise rural. Most of the listed buildings are houses and associated structures, cottages, farmhouses and farm buildings. The other listed buildings include churches and an associated structures, a surviving tower from a former church, public houses, a school, a railway viaduct, a bridge, a milestone, a boundary stone and a war memorial.

== Key ==
Grade	Criteria
II*	Particularly important buildings of more than special interest
II	Buildings of national importance and special interest

== Buildings ==
Name and location	Photograph	Date	Notes	Grade
Barn east of Whitwood Farmhouse; 53.72464°N 1.76715°W	—	1445	An aisled barn, it is timber framed and has been encased in stone with some brick infill, and has corrugated sheet roofing. There are seven bays, a separate lower section at the north and a single aisle to the east. In the east and west fronts are cart entries and other openings.	II
Cinder Hill; 53.73794°N 1.81480°W	—	Late 15th century	This consists of a timber framed hall and a barn at right angles. They were encased in stone in the 18th century and the hall has been rendered. The hall has a large window with a hood mould, and the barn has a single aisle.	II
Hill End Farmhouse; 53.73785°N 1.78587°W	—	Late 15th century	The house originated as a timber framed open hall that was encased in stone when a rear aisle was added in the 17th century. It has a stone slate roof, two storeys, and three bays. All of the windows have been altered.	II
Smith House and Smith House West; 53.71839°N 1.78539°W	—	Early 16th century	The timber framed house was encased in stone in 1672. It contains quoins and has a stone slate roof with gables and lantern finials. The house consists of a three bay hall range with one storey and an attic, two-storey cross-wings, and a two-storey rear wing. On the front is a two-storey gabled porch, and a doorway with a moulded surround and a dated lintel. The windows are mullioned, or mullioned and transomed with hood moulds.	II
Upper Rookes; 53.73492°N 1.78590°W	—	1589	A house that has been much remodelled, it is in stone with a stone slate roof that has coped gables and crocketed finials. There are two storeys, an L-shaped plan, and a front of three gabled bays, the left bay being a cross-wing. In the right bay is a doorway with composite jambs and a lintel with the date and initials in a shield. The windows have double chamfered mullions.	II
Thorn Tree Farmhouse; 53.74002°N 1.79227°W	—	c. 1620	The house is in stone with quoins and a stone slate roof. There are two storeys, three bays and a rear outshut under a catslide roof. The windows are mullioned.	II
The Sisters' House and Prior's Mead, Priestley Green; 53.73412°N 1.80129°W	—	1630	Two houses in rendered stone, with stone slate roofs that have coped gables with kneelers and finials. There are two storeys, and the houses consist of two gabled bays at the left, the right bay projecting, then a range of two bays, and a gabled cross-wing at the right. The main doorway has a lean-to porch and an inscribed and dated lintel, and most of the windows are mullioned.	II
Birkhouse Cottage and Upper Birkhouse Farmhouse; 53.71960°N 1.76920°W	—	1647	A house later divided into two, it is in stone and has a stone slate roof with a coped gable and a kneeler to the left. There are two storeys, two bays, a rear aisle and a rear kitchen wing. On the south front is a gabled porch and a doorway with composite jambs and a dated four-centred arched lintel. The windows are mullioned, and at the rear is a doorway with composite jambs and a depressed arched lintel.	II
Archway to Coley Hall; 53.73835°N 1.80577°W		1649	The archway is in stone, and consists of a broad moulded elliptical arch with moulded imposts, joggled voussoirs, a keystone with the date, a cross motif and a carved face, and spandrels carved with dogs and other animals. The arch has a plinth and a string course that rises over the keystone and has two shallow spandrels. On the top is a raked cornice, a pierced tympanum and finials.	II*
Barn west of 19 and 20 Towngate; 53.72833°N 1.81573°W	—	Mid 17th century	A double-aisled barn in stone with a stone slate roof. It has five bays and contains a square-headed cart entry.	II
113 and 115 Wakefield Road, Lightcliffe; 53.72583°N 1.79793°W	—	17th century	The houses are in rendered stone with a stone slate roof. There are two storeys, two bays and an aisle at the rear with a catslide roof. The right house has a gabled porch, and the windows are mullioned.	II
Birkdale Farmhouse; 53.71973°N 1.76987°W	—	Mid 17th century	A house with a cottage at both ends, later combined into one dwelling, it is in stone with a stone slate roof. The house has quoins and a string course, two storeys and four bays. One doorway has composite jambs and a four-centred arched lintel and the other has monolithic jambs. The windows are mullioned, and some also have transoms. On the left is a two-storey rendered cottage and at the right end is a single-storey cottage.	II
Lower Birkhouse Cottage; 53.71950°N 1.76882°W	—	17th century	Originally a two-storey one-bay house, with a single-storey cottage and a wing at right angles added in the 18th century. The building is in stone with a stone slate roof; the original house has a coped gable with kneelers. The windows are mullioned with hood moulds.	II
Barn northeast of Lower Place Farmhouse; 53.72377°N 1.82421°W	—	Mid 17th century	The barn is double-aisled, and is in rendered stone with a stone slate roof. It has an interior of three bays.	II
Rookes Hall with warehouse 53.73377°N 1.78829°W		Mid 17th century	The warehouse was added to the house in the 18th century and this has been incorporated into the house. The building is in stone with quoins, a string course, and a two-span stone slate roof with coped gables and kneelers. The house has two storeys, a double-pile plan and three bays. In the left bay is a porch that has a doorway with moulded jambs and a shaped lintel, and above it is a sundial, a parapet and finials. The inner doorway has a chamfered surround. Most of the windows are mullioned and transomed and there is an oriel window with canted sides.	II
Sowood House; 53.73550°N 1.81384°W		Mid 17th century	A stone house, partly rendered, that has a stone slate roof with coped gables and kneelers. There are two storeys and an H-shaped plan, consisting of a two-bay hall range and projecting gabled cross-wings. The doorway has composite jambs and a segmental arch and most of the windows are mullioned.	II
Barn northeast of Upper Birkhouse Farmhouse; 53.71972°N 1.76896°W	—	17th century	The encasing of an earlier barn, it is in stone with a stone slate roof, and contains a tall square-headed cart entry. There are five bays and a single aisle and it is flanked by single-storey extensions under catslide roofs at each end.	II
Woolrow and Woolrow Farmhouse; 53.71620°N 1.77151°W	—	17th century	A house, later two dwellings, consisting of a hall range with a cross-wing added in the 18th century. It is in stone, rendered at the front, with quoins and a string course in the cross-wing. The hall range has two storeys and two bays and the cross-wing has one storey and an attic. On the front is a porch and a doorway with a shallow-arched lintel and spandrels. The windows are mullioned; some are cross windows and others also have transoms.	II
Wynteredge Hall; 53.73486°N 1.80964°W	—	Mid 17th century	The house was much altered in the 19th century when the front was rebuilt and a single-storey gabled wing was added to the left. The house is in stone with a stone slate roof and two storeys. At the front are a gabled cross-wing and a gable over the doorway. The windows are mullioned and there is a mullioned and transomed stair window.	II
Giles House; 53.71760°N 1.79729°W	—	1655	The house is in stone, and has a stone slate roof with coped gables, kneelers and ball finials. There are two storeys, a double-pile plan, a front of three gabled bays and a rear range. The windows have chamfered mullions, and those in the ground floor also have transoms. Above the doorway is an initialled and dated plaque, possibly re-set, in the middle gable is a columbarium, and in the left bay is a coat of arms in relief. At the rear is a semicircular-arched doorway with monolithic jambs and a keystone.	II*
Yew Trees, Hipperholme; 53.72058°N 1.80400°W	—	Mid to late 17th century	The house is in stone, rendered at the sides and rear, and has a stone slate roof with coped gables and kneelers. There are two storeys, and the house consists of a projecting cross-wing a hall range to the right, the latter altered in the 18th century, and a rear single-storey outshut with a catslide roof. In the hall range are paired doorways with composite jambs. Most of the windows are mullioned, some have transoms and some have hood moulds.	II
3, 4, 5 and 6 Brook Green, Hipperholme; 53.72618°N 1.81654°W	—	Late 17th century	A house divided into four cottages, it is in stone with a stone slate roof. There are two storeys, a range of two bays, a rendered cross-wing and a rear aisle. The two doorways have monolithic jambs, the windows are mullioned, one also has transoms, and above the ground floor windows are hood moulds.	II
16 and 17 Towngate, Hipperholme; 53.72817°N 1.81500°W	—	Late 17th century	A house, later two cottages, it is in rendered stone with a stone slate roof. There are two storeys and three bays. The central doorway has monolithic jambs and the windows are mullioned.	II
18–20 Towngate, Hipperholme; 53.72838°N 1.81539°W	—	Late 17th century	The house is in stone, rendered at the rear, and has a stone slate roof with coped gables. There are two storeys with attics, a front of two bays and behind are two parallel ranges at right angles. On the front are two gables with a parapet between them. To the left is a doorway with a heavy lintel and within it is a door frame with a depressed Tudor arch and carved spandrels. To the right is another doorway with monolithic jambs. The windows are mullioned, and in the gables are lenticular apertures.	II
Archway, 18–20 Towngate, Hipperholme; 53.72822°N 1.81541°W	—	Late 17th century	The archway is in the south garden wall and is in stone. It consists of composite moulded jambs, a flat lintel and carved finials.	II
Bottom Hall Farmhouse and Cottage; 53.72745°N 1.78816°W	—	Late 17th century (probable)	The buildings, which were at one time a workhouse, are in stone with stone slate roofs. The oldest part is to the right; it is rendered, with quoins at the rear, one storey, and it contains modern windows. Recessed to the left is a pair of 18th-century cottages with two storeys and a rear single-storey outshut. These cottages contain paired doorways with monolithic jambs and mullioned windows.	II
Coley Croft; 53.73818°N 1.80573°W	—	Late 17th century	A house and an attached barn, the latter converted into a garage, they are in stone with a stone slate roof. There are two storeys, three bays, and a single-storey rear wing. The doorway has a semicircular arch and an architrave, the windows are mullioned, and one also has a transom.	II
Coley Hall; 53.73866°N 1.80575°W		Late 17th century	The house was refronted in the 18th century. It is in stone on a plinth, with chamfered rusticated quoins and panelled pilaster strips above, a band, a coved cornice, a blocking course and a hipped stone slate roof. There are two storeys, a symmetrical front of nine bays and a rear extension. The central doorway has a shouldered architrave and a simple pediment and the windows on the front are sashes with architraves, moulded lintels and keystones. The right return has three bays and contains a re-used doorway and cross windows, and at the rear are mullioned windows, one also with transoms.	II*
Barn, Lower Rookes; 53.73318°N 1.78802°W	—	Late 17th century	A single aisled barn that was later extended, it is in stone, with a stone slate roof and six bays. The barn contains opposing segmental-arched cart entries, with a gable above the entry on the front. There are doorways in the aisle with monolithic jambs and in the left gable end is an arched entry with a Venetian window above.	II
Barn west of Thorn Tree Farmhouse; 53.73996°N 1.79255°W	—	Late 17th century	The barn is in rendered stone and has a stone slate roof. It has a single aisle and a cart entry set in the portal of the aisle.	II
Lower Green House, Hove Edge; 53.71651°N 1.79750°W	—	Late 17th or early 18th century	The house is in stone, partly rendered, with a stone slate roof. It consists of a single-bay hall range and a projecting cross-wing, and at the rear are two parallel gabled ranges. In the gable of the cross-wing is a tablet for a sundial. On the front the windows are sashes and on the sides and at the rear they are mullioned. Over the doorway and some of the windows are hood moulds.	II
Lower Place Farmhouse; 53.72363°N 1.82439°W	—	Late 17th or early 18th century	A stone house with quoins, a string course and a stone slate roof with coped gables and moulded kneelers. There are two storeys and a symmetrical front of three bays. The central doorway has chamfered composite jambs and a shallow arched lintel with spandrels and the windows are mullioned.	II
Ivy House Farm, Hove Edge; 53.71513°N 1.80137°W	—	1713	The house is in stone with quoins on the left, and a stone slate roof with a coped gable and kneelers on the left. There are two storeys, a double-pile plan, a front of three bays and a lean-to extension at the rear. Most of the windows are mullioned. On the front are three doorways, two with monolithic jambs and the other with composite jambs and an inscribed lintel.	II
Harley Head Farmhouse; 53.71815°N 1.80544°W	—	Early 18th century	A house that was extended in the late 18th or early 19th century and later converted into a row of cottages. These are in whitewashed stone with a stone slate roof and two storeys. The original house has a hall and a cross-wing with a hipped roof, and a rear outshut. It contains two doorways with monolithic jambs, a mix of mullioned and sash windows and a hood mould over the ground floor openings. The extension has a lower roof line, three bays and contains three-light mullioned windows.	II
Lower Carr Farmhouse; 53.73615°N 1.78334°W	—	Early 18th century	The farmhouse was altered in the 19th century, and has been converted into three cottages. It is in stone with quoins and a stone slate roof. There are two storeys, the windows are mullioned and the doorways have monolithic jambs.	II
Ryders Court; 53.72898°N 1.81389°W	—	Early 18th century	A house later used for other purposes, it is in stone, partly rendered, with a stone slate roof. There are two storeys and two bays. At the rear is a cross window and the other windows are mullioned.	II
Sun Inn. Lightcliffe; 53.72418°N 1.78973°W		1730	The public house and attached cottage are in stone with quoins and a stone slate roof. There are two storeys, the public house has four bays and the cottage at the right end has one bay. Both parts have doorways with monolithic jambs and sash windows with thin mullions. Above the doorway of the public house is a decorative slab engraved with the date and initials.	II
Smith House Cottage, Lodge and stable block 53.71839°N 1.78481°W		Mid 18th century	A former stable block converted into two cottages and a garage in stone with a stone slate roof. To the left is a two-storey two-bay cottage with mullioned windows, to the right is a single storey range containing a doorway with monolithic jambs, cross windows and a dormer. Further to the right is a segmental-arched cart entry, over which is a stepped mullioned window, and a finial surmounted by a brass and wrought iron weathervane, and to its right is a smaller cart entry. At the right end is another two-storey cottage with the gable end facing the street and the gable containing applied timber framing and bargeboards.	II
The Old White Bear Inn, Norwood Green; 53.73896°N 1.78958°W		Mid 18th century	The public house is in rendered stone and has a stone slate roof with coped gables. There are two storeys and two bays. The doorway has monolithic jambs and the windows are mullioned.	II
Cottages east of Wynteredge Hall; 53.73496°N 1.80901°W	—	Mid 18th century	A mirror image pair of cottages in stone with quoins, a band, and a stone slate roof with coped gables and kneelers. The doorways have monolithic jambs, and the windows are mullioned.	II
West View; 53.72692°N 1.81235°W	—	1771	A row of three stone cottages with quoins and a stone slate roof with a coped gable on the left. There are two storeys, three bays and a single-storey gabled extension on the left. Some widows are mullioned, some have been altered, and in the left return is a Venetian window.	II
Tower to Old St Matthew's Church; 53.72455°N 1.78961°W		1774–75	Apart from the tower, the church was demolished in 1969. The tower is in stone with an octagonal arcaded cupola surmounted by a ball finial. In the ground floor is a round-headed window and a circular opening above. In the belfry is a re-set inscribed stone from an earlier church.	II
Former coach house 53.72176°N 1.79285°W	—	c. 1775	The former coach house to Cliffe Hill has been converted for residential use. It is in brick with stone dressings and a hipped slate roof. There are two storeys and seven bays, and it contains a central doorway inserted into a blind arched cart door, above which is a semicircular window; the other windows are round-headed.	II
Former stables and wall 53.72176°N 1.79317°W	—	c. 1775	The former stable range to Cliffe Hill and linking walls are in brick with stone dressings. The stable range has a hipped slate roof and two storeys. It contains doorways, round-arched windows, semicircular lights and round-arched loading doors. The walls are a screen wall and flanking walls and contain a broad gateway.	II
186–190 Wakefield Road, Lightcliffe; 53.72399°N 1.78738°W	—	Late 18th century	A row of three stone cottages with stone slate roofs. They have two storeys, and each cottage has one bay, a doorway with monolithic jambs and mullioned windows. The two cottages on the right have gabled porches.	II
3–11 Syke Lane, Priestley Green; 53.73365°N 1.80094°W		Late 18th century	A row of stone cottages with quoins and stone slate roofs. They have two storeys and form an L-shaped plan, with seven bays facing the lane and five at right angles facing a courtyard. The windows are mullioned, and those facing the lane have three arched lights and hollowed spandrels. The doorways have moulded jambs, arched lintels and hollowed spandrels.	II
211 and 213 Wakefield Road, Lightcliffe; 53.72415°N 1.78546°W	—	Late 18th century	A pair of stone cottages with a stone slate roof. There are two storeys and three bays. The doorways have monolithic jambs and the windows are mullioned.	II
Mytholme Farmhouse; 53.72646°N 1.82662°W	—	Late 18th century	A pair of cottages, later combined, they are in stone with a stone slate roof. There are two storeys and two bays. The windows are mullioned and there are two doorways with monolithic jambs, the one on the left with a gabled porch and the one on the right converted into a window.	II
The Travellers Public House; 53.72549°N 1.81766°W		Late 18th century	The public house is in stone with quoins, decorative gutter brackets to the eaves and a stone slate roof. There are two storeys and four bays. In the second bay is a doorway with monolithic jambs and a sash window and the other bays contain mullioned windows.	II
Thornhill House, Hipperholme; 53.72797°N 1.81469°W	—	Late 18th century	A stone house with quoins, bands, a moulded cornice, and a slate roof with coped gables. There are three storeys and a symmetrical front of five bays. In the centre is a gabled porch and the windows are sashes.	II
Whitehall Hotel, Hipperholme; 53.72561°N 1.81229°W		Late 18th century	A public house in stone with quoins, and a stone slate roof with coped gables and kneelers. There are three storeys and three bays. In the middle bay is a doorway with monolithic jambs above which is a tall stair window. Elsewhere the windows are mullioned, and there is another stair window at the rear.	II
Hipperholme Grammar School; 53.72848°N 1.81347°W		1783	The school is in stone with a stone slate roof. The original part is symmetrical and has one storey. The central part projects and has quoins, an inscribed tablet, a clock face and a gable surmounted by a bellcote on Doric columns that was added in 1835. This is flanked on each side by three bays containing sash windows. In 1906–07, the school was extended to the left, the extension having two storeys and three bays, the outer bays with coped gables, kneelers and finials, and containing mullioned windows.	II
Barn northwest of Coley Hall; 53.73902°N 1.80622°W	—	1794	The barn is in stone with quoins and a stone slate roof. It has seven bays, and contains opposing cart entries with composite jambs, elliptical heads and keystones, one inscribed with initials and the date. At each end are doorways with monolithic jambs, over which are square pitching holes.	II
South Edge House; 53.72289°N 1.81256°W	—	Late 18th or early 19th century	A pair of mirror image cottages in stone, with quoins and a hipped stone slate roof. There are two storeys and a symmetrical front of four bays. The paired central doorways have monolithic jambs and the windows are mullioned.	II
St John's Church, Coley; 53.73859°N 1.81223°W		1816	The church, which was altered and restored in 1902 by C. Hodgson Fowler, is in Gothic Revival style. It is built in stone and consists of a nave, a short chancel and a west tower. The tower has three stages, diagonal buttresses, a west doorway and an embattled parapet. The nave also has an embattled parapet, and at the east end is a window with three lights containing Perpendicular tracery, flanked by two windows with Y-tracery.	II
Holme House, Bailiff Bridge; 53.72370°N 1.78238°W	—	c. 1820	A stone house with quoins, a cornice, a blocking course and a slate roof. There are two storeys and a symmetrical front of three bays. The doorway and the windows, which are sashes, have plain surrounds. Across the front of the house is a cast iron verandah with seven arches and a slate roof.	II
Coley Walks Farmhouse; 53.73916°N 1.80493°W	—	Early 19th century	A pair of stone cottages with quoins and a stone slate roof with coped gables and kneelers. There are two storeys and three bays. The two doorways have monolithic jambs and the windows are mullioned.	II
Faircroft, Norwood Green; 53.73908°N 1.78976°W	—	Early 19th century	A stone house with stone slate roof, two storeys and two bays. The doorway has monolithic jambs and the windows are mullioned.	II
Bottom Viaduct; 53.72976°N 1.79100°W		1850	The viaduct was designed by John Hawkshaw and built by the Lancashire and Yorkshire Railway to carry its line over the valley of Bottom Hall Beck. It is in stone and consists of eleven semicircular arches with spans of 40 feet (12 m) on piers 114 feet (35 m) high.	II
Bridge, Crow Nest Park; 53.72440°N 1.79634°W	—	Mid 19th century	The bridge in the grounds of the demolished Crow Nest is in stone, and consists of a single segmental arch with rusticated voussoirs and raised bands. The parapet is coped and contains pierced slots forming balusters.	II
Milestone near Hopewell House, Hipperholme; 53.72799°N 1.80103°W		Mid 19th century	The milestone is on the southeast side of Leeds Road (A58 road). It has an arched head, a triangular plan, two projecting faces, and lettering in cast iron. On the head is "LEEDS & WHITEHALL ROAD" "HIPPERHOLME" and on the faces are the distances to Halifax and Leeds.	II
102–116 Wakefield Road, Lightcliffe; 53.72488°N 1.79365°W		1868	A terrace of stone cottages, with a slate roof that has fleur-de-lys ridge tiles. It consists of a central four-bay range flanked by gabled cross-wings. The central range has one storey and attics and each cottage contains a doorway with composite jambs and four-centred arches, a chamfered cruciform window and a gabled dormer above. The cross-wings have two storeys and each has a canted bay window and cross windows above.	II
Former Lightcliffe United Reformed Church; 53.72792°N 1.80237°W		1870–71	The former church was designed by Lockwood and Mawson in Gothic Revival style. It is in stone with a slate roof and has a cruciform plan, consisting of a nave with a clerestory, north and south aisles, a north porch, north and south transepts, a chancel and a south west steeple. The steeple has a tower with angle buttresses, a west doorway, clock faces, pinnacles and a recessed octagonal spire. At the west end are buttresses with crocketed pinnacles and a five-light window, and the chancel has a rose window.	II
St Michael's Church, Lightcliffe; 53.72502°N 1.79447°W		1874	The church, which is in Gothic Revival style, is in stone with a slate roof. It consists of a nave with a clerestory, north and south aisles, a baptistry, a transeptal north chapel, a chancel, a vestry and a northwest tower. The tower has four stages, diagonal buttresses, an octagonal stair turret to the north, a north doorway above which is a niche containing a statue of St Matthew, a clock face and an embattled parapet. An embattled parapet also runs along the clerestory and the chancel.	II
Gate piers, St Michael's Church; 53.72527°N 1.79441°W		1875	The gate piers are in stone and have octagonal shafts and crocketed pinnacled caps. They are embraced by short stubby wall with Gothic coping.	II
Boundary stone 53.73861°N 1.81407°W	—	Late 19th century	The boundary stone is by a footpath, and consists of a round-headed stone divided by a line down the centre. The left part is inscribed "HIPPERHOLME" and the right part "SHELF".	II
Former St Aidan's Church; 53.72377°N 1.77605°W		c. 1884	The church, later used for other purposes, is in stone with a slate roof. It has an L-shaped plan, consisting of a single-storey hall with a porch and a two-storey cross-wing on the left. The cross-wing, the porch and the right gable end have elaborate shaped gables with finials. The windows are mullioned and transomed and in the right gable end the window is stepped with an oculus above. The doorway has moulded jambs and a depressed arch.	II
139–151 Wakefield Road, Lightcliffe; 53.72526°N 1.79355°W		1885	A terrace of stone cottages, with a stone slate roof that has coped gables, kneelers, and finials. It consists of a central five-bay range flanked by gabled cross-wings each with different details. The central range has one storey and attics. Each cottage has a doorway with chamfered jambs, and a canopy with an ogee head on curved consoles. In the ground floor is a mullioned and transomed window and above is a mullioned window in a gabled dormer. The left gable has a canted bay window and in the gable apex is a recess with a dated plaque. The right gable has a lean-to porch in the angle with a semicircular arched doorway and a window with an arched head above. In the upper floor of the gable is a stepped window with a decorative hood mould.	II
100 Wakefield Road, Lightcliffe; 53.72465°N 1.79440°W	—	1900–01	A vicarage, later a private house, it is in stone on a plinth and has a stone slate roof with coped gables. There are two storeys and a symmetrical front of three bays. The outer bays are gabled and each contains a two-storey bay window with splayed corners. The middle bay is recessed and contains a doorway with a moulded Tudor arch. Above it is a twelve-light mullioned and transomed stair window. The rear has a hipped roof and contains a semicircular moulded entrance arch.	II
War Memorial, Norwood Green; 53.73662°N 1.78587°W		1923	The war memorial, which stands in a triangular garden, is in Yorkshire sandstone and is 5 metres (16 ft) high. It has a three-stepped hexagonal base and a tall plinth, on which is a column surmounted by an urn. On the column are incised shields. On the plinth are inscriptions and the names of those from Norwood Green and Coley lost in the two World Wars.	II
Junction House, Norwood Green; 53.73596°N 1.78082°W		Undated	Originally a railway signalman's house it is in stone and has a slate roof with steep coped gables. There are two storeys and an L-shaped plan. Over the windows are hood moulds and in the gable apex is an arrow slit.	II
