= Lightcliffe =

Village in West Yorkshire, England

Coordinates: 53.72428°N 1.78926°W

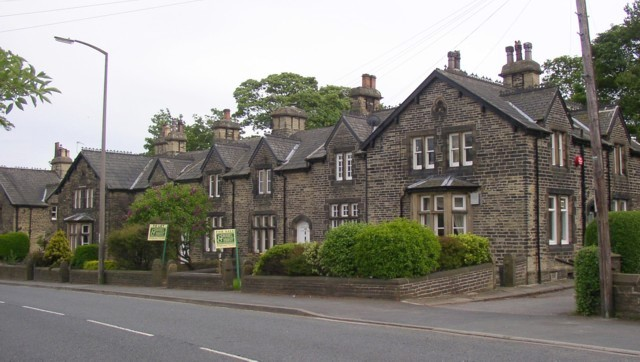
- Wakefield Road, Lightcliffe

- Location within West Yorkshire
- OS grid reference: SE140253
- Metropolitan borough: Calderdale
- Metropolitan county: West Yorkshire
- Region: Yorkshire and the Humber
- Country: England
- Sovereign state: United Kingdom
- Post town: HALIFAX
- Postcode district: HX3
- Dialling code: 01422
- Police: West Yorkshire
- Fire: West Yorkshire
- Ambulance: Yorkshire
- UK Parliament: Calder Valley

Lightcliffe is a village in the Calderdale district in West Yorkshire, England. Historically part of the West Riding of Yorkshire, it is situated approximately three miles east of Halifax and two miles north west of Brighouse. Lightcliffe was a separate parish in 1846 in the West Riding of Yorkshire.

== Parish ==
Lighcliffe lies in the unparished area of the borough of Calderdale, who are responsible for all local government activity in the village and surrounding areas. It lies in the borough ward of Hipperholme and Lightcliffe and the parliamentary constituency of Calder Valley. As a village in an unparished area, there are no formal civil parish boundaries defining Lightcliffe, but mapping shows it as adjoining the villages of Hipperholme to the west, Norwood Green to the north, Bailiff Bridge to the east, and Brighouse to the south.

== Location and facilities ==
Lightcliffe is a dormitory village for people working in Halifax, Brighouse, and Bradford, and commuting to Leeds, Manchester, and Sheffield. It stretches along the Wakefield and Leeds roads, surrounded by fields and rolling countryside. Lightcliffe feels very established and green – with many mature trees and large houses. Lightcliffe's main park, "the Stray", is 11 acres of lawn and trees and contains a war memorial erected in 1923. In April 1937, an avenue of trees was planted in the park to commemorate King George VI's coronation. Towards the village centre is the cricket club. There are two golf clubs, the long established Lightcliffe Golf Club and Crow's Nest Golf Club.

The oldest part of the village contains the Sun Inn – a former coaching inn, along what was in antiquity the main road to London. The new Lightcliffe Anglican church, St Matthew's, was built in 1875 to replace the old church. It is a Gothic Revival building, with an embattled parapet which is reminiscent of a medieval castle.

== Education ==
Lightcliffe Academy is a secondary school serving the area. Lightcliffe Church of England Primary School is located in an old stone building and Cliffe Hill Primary has newer premises.

== Churches ==
On Leeds Road is situated the URC church – now converted to offices. A feature of this church is that it contained a peal of bells – unusual for a nonconformist church. It has a tall steeple and stained glass. The church congregation has joined with Hipperholme Methodist Church to form a Local Ecumenical Partnership worshipping at Christ Church at the main Crossroads

== Notable people ==
Sir Titus Salt, a wealthy businessman known for having built the village of Saltaire, as well as owning a mill there, once lived in a large house, Crow Nest. The house was a former home of Ann Walker, partner of Anne Lister, the latter of whom was also known as "Gentleman Jack". Crow Nest has since been demolished, and its grounds are now a golf course. Walker is buried a short distance away, across the road at the site of Old St Matthew's Churchyard. Old St Matthew's Church has since been replaced by a newer Church of St Matthew. Walker also once lived at Lydgate House, now surrounded by a residential street called Lydgate Park, and formerly alongside Crow Nest. Walker and her family also lived at Cliffe Hill, which still survives .

== See also ==
- Listed buildings in Hipperholme and Lightcliffe
- Lightcliffe railway station
