= Wyke and Norwood Green railway station =

Disused railway station in West Yorkshire, England

Wyke and Norwood Green
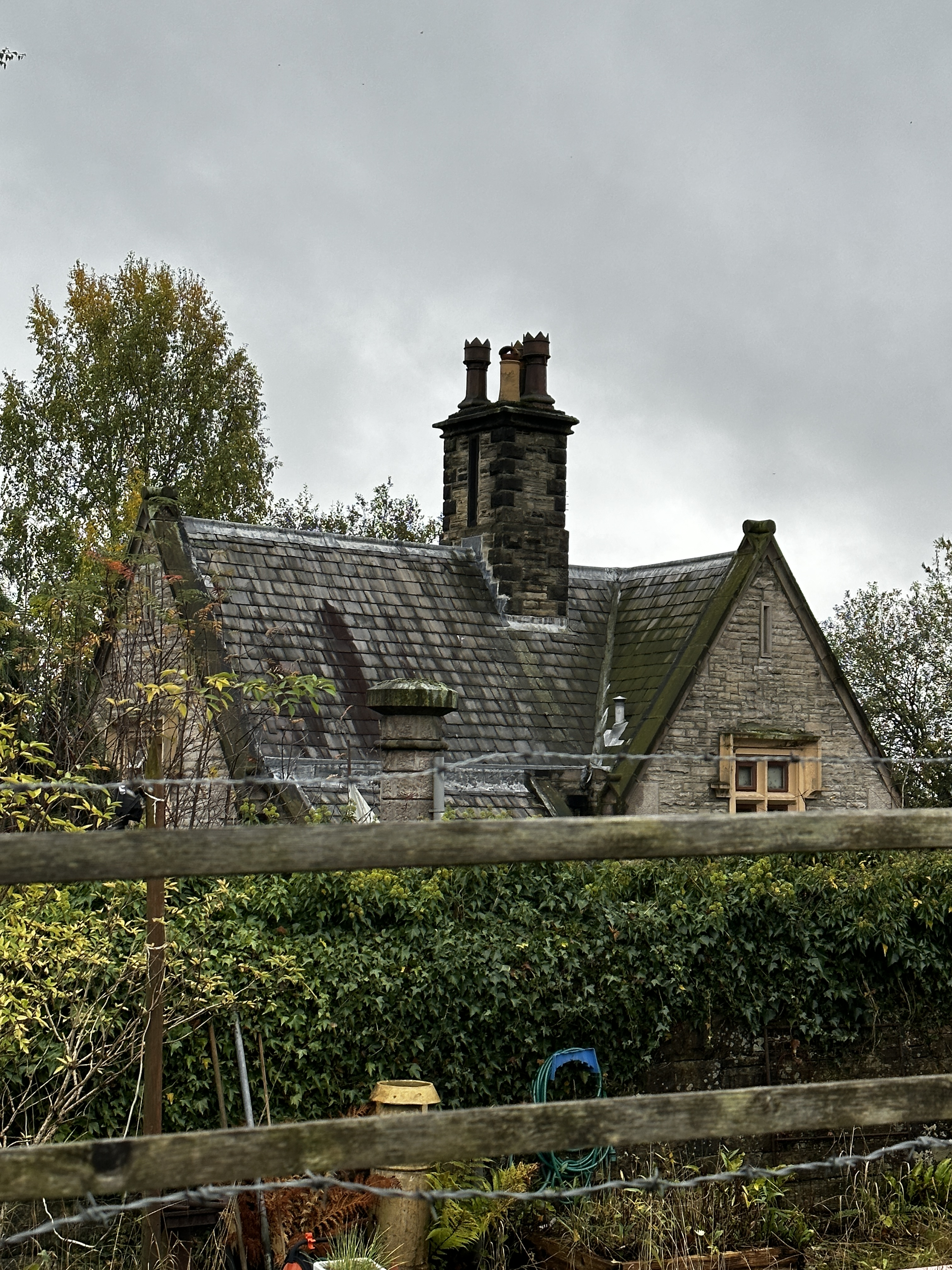
- Junction House, Station Road, Wyke

General information
- Location: Wyke, City of Bradford; England
- Coordinates: 53.737280°N 1.778500°W
- Grid reference: SE147267
- Platforms: 2

Other information
- Status: Disused

History
- Pre-grouping: Lancashire and Yorkshire Railway
- Post-grouping: London Midland and Scottish Railway

Key dates
- 17 August 1850: Opened as Pickle Bridge
- 1852: Renamed Wyke
- 1896: Moved and renamed Wyke and Norwood Green
- September 1953: Station closes
Location

Wyke and Norwood Green railway station served the villages of Wyke and Norwood Green in West Yorkshire, England.

== History ==
Originally situated a little to the south west and named Pickle Bridge, it was opened in 1850, renamed Wyke in 1852 and moved to the final location in 1896. It was closed to passengers by the British Transport Commission on 21 September 1953.

A grade II listed building, called Junction House, still exists on the site and is used as a private house. According to Historic England it was a signalman's cottage and may have been part of the original station.

Preceding station	Disused railways	Following station
Lightcliffe	L&Y; Caldervale Line	Low Moor or Cleckheaton Central
Bailiff Bridge	L&Y; Pickle Bridge Line	Low Moor or Cleckheaton Central
