= Lightcliffe Academy =

Coordinates: 53.7225°N 1.7891°W

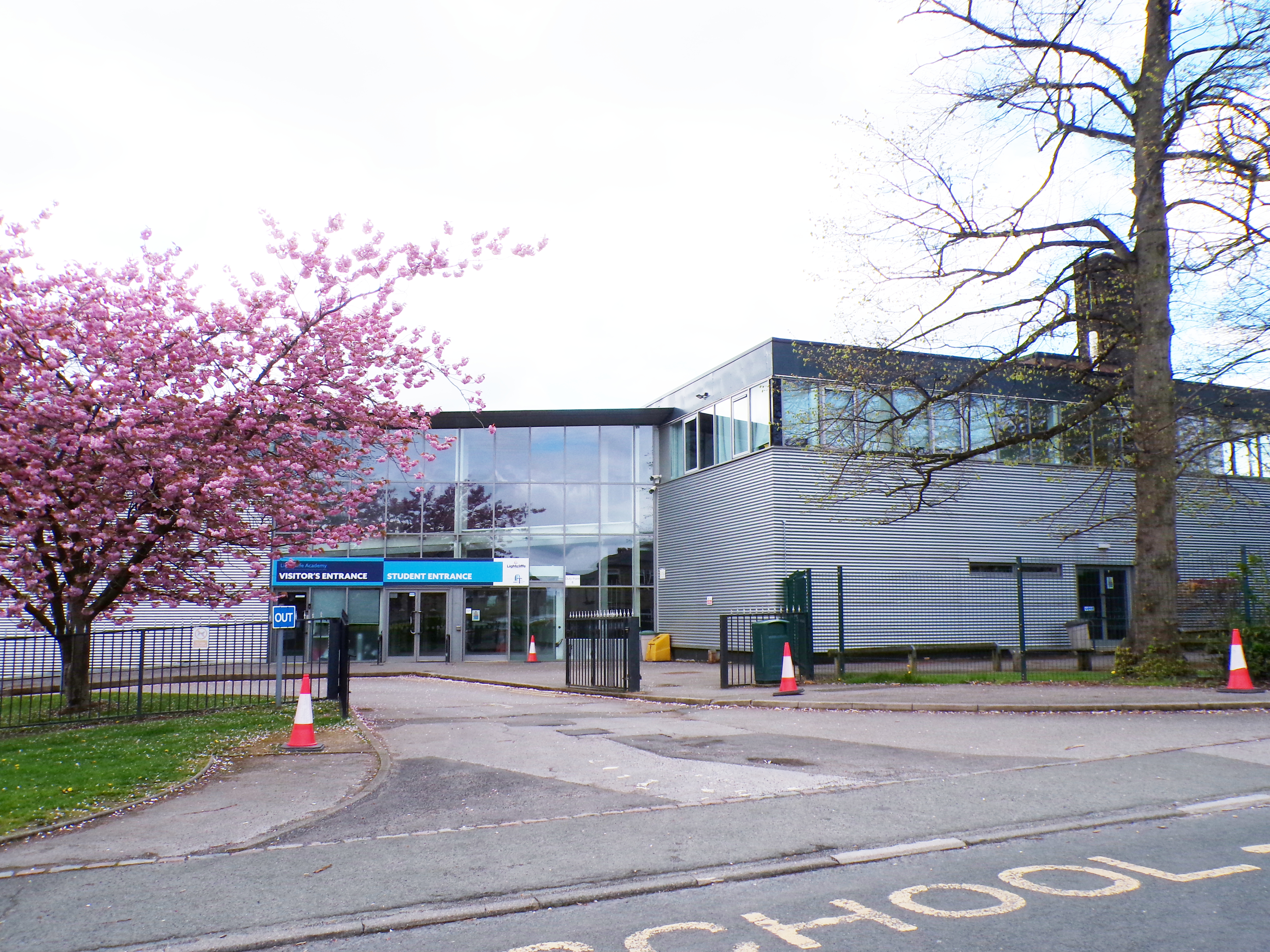

Location
- Stoney Lane; Lightcliffe; Halifax, West Yorkshire, HX3 8TL; England

Information
- Type: Academy
- Religious affiliation: All
- Department for Education URN: 137036 Tables
- Ofsted: Reports
- Head of School: Jo Hackett
- Age: 11 to 16
- Colours: Red, blue, green, orange, purple and yellow
- Website: www.lightcliffeacademy.co.uk

Lightcliffe Academy (formerly Hipperholme and Lightcliffe High School and Eastfield) is a high school situated between Lightcliffe and Hipperholme in West Yorkshire, England. The school has academy status.

== Notable former pupils ==
- Samuel Bottomley, actor
- Channique Sterling-Brown, actor
- Danielle Ronald, actress
