= Judy Woods =

Woodlands in Bradford, West Yorkshire, England

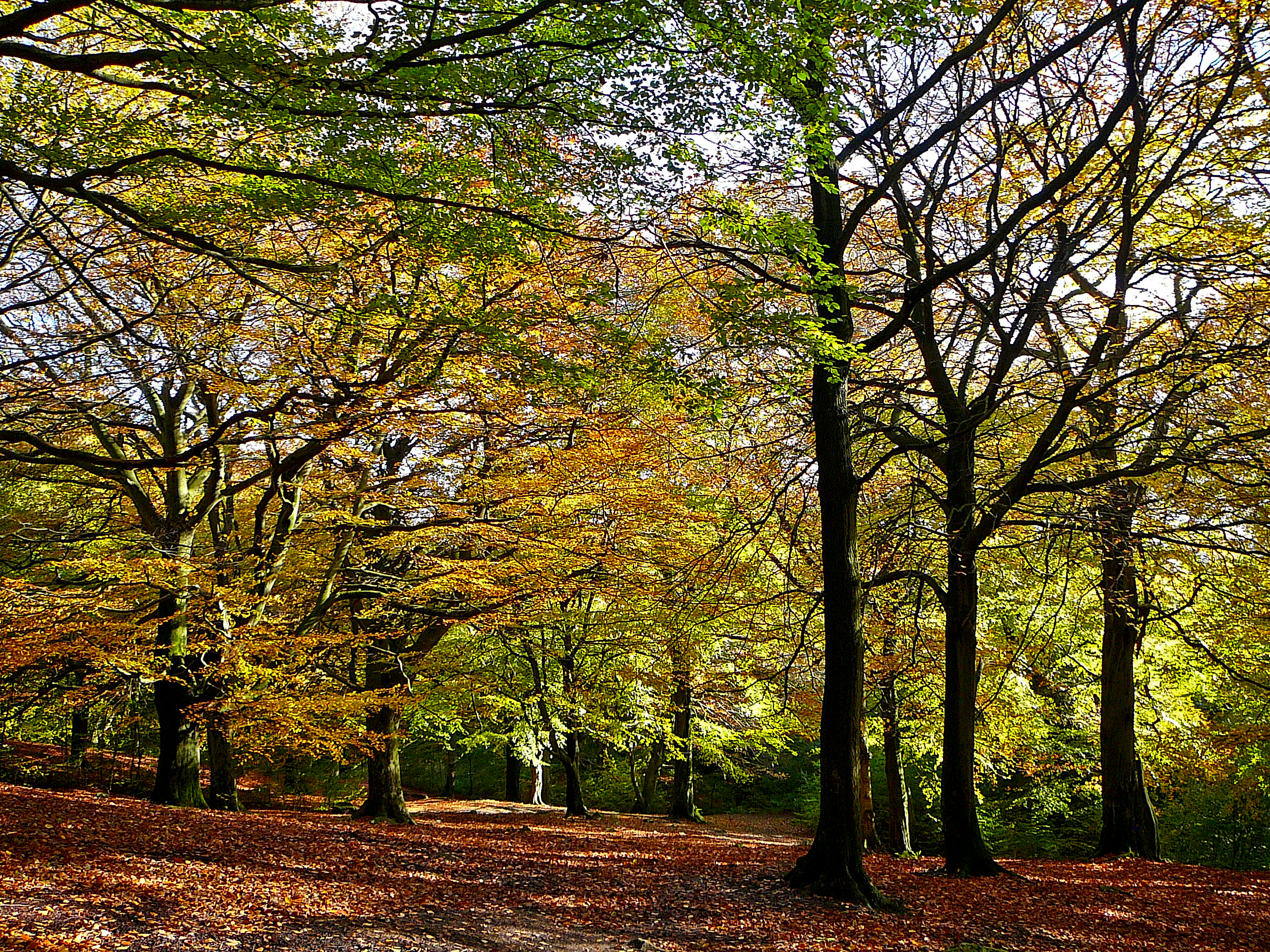
- Judy Woods in June 2014

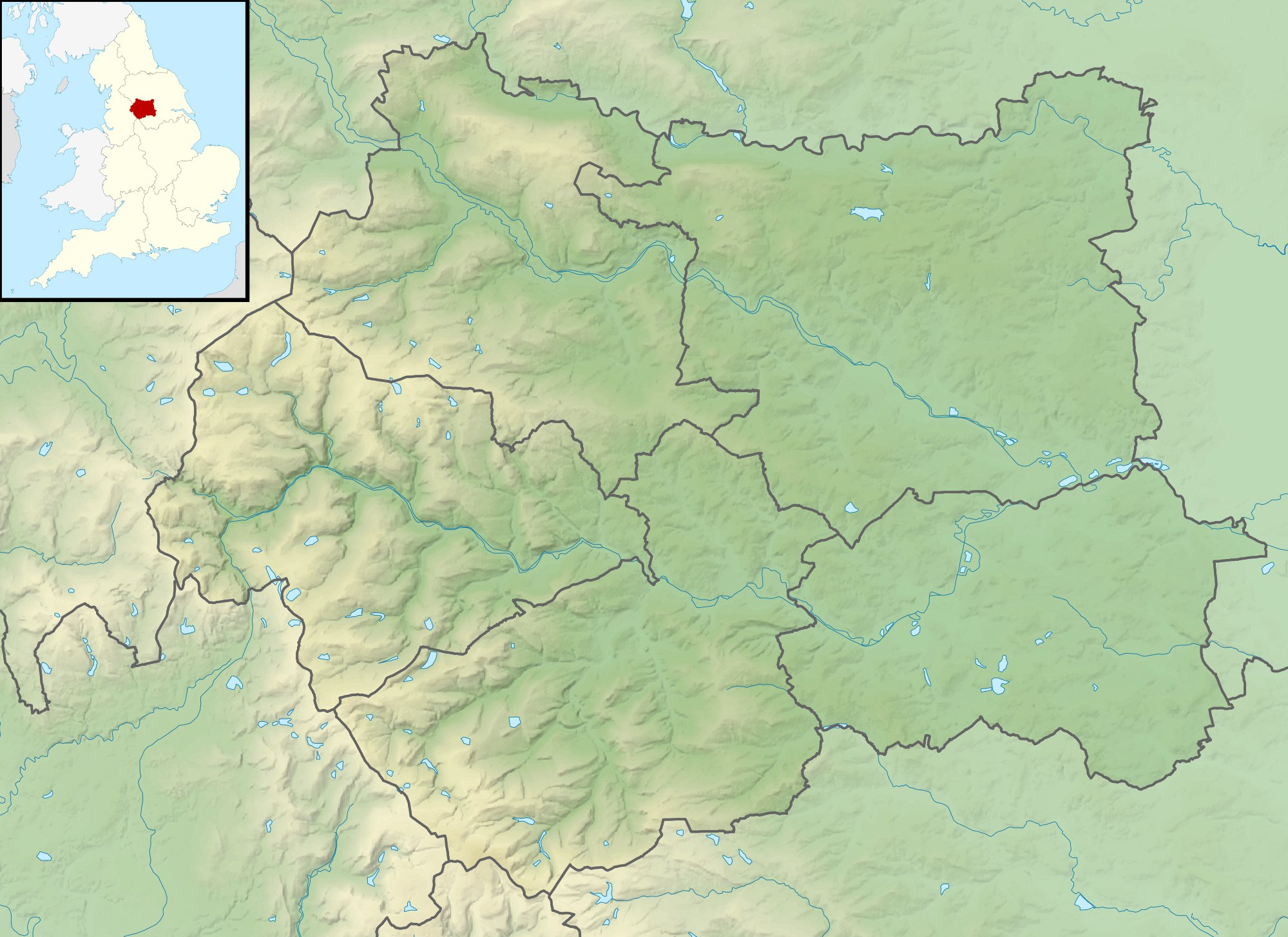
- Location within West Yorkshire
- Location: Bradford, West Yorkshire, England
- Coordinates: 53.744°N 1.789°W
- Area: 138 acres (56 ha)
- Designated: 2025
- Designation: Local Nature Reserve (LNR)

Judy Woods is a complex of woodlands in West Yorkshire, England. Individual woodlands in the complex include Jagger Park Wood, Royds Hall Great Wood, Old Hanna Wood and Low Wood. They separate the areas of Low Moor and Wyke, to the east and in Bradford, from the village of Norwood Green, to the west and in Calderdale. The woods are largely in the City of Bradford, and are one of Yorkshire's largest areas of beech woodland.

The woods were originally part of the Royds Hall Estate, belonging to the Rookes family, and are named in documents going back to the 16th century and beyond. In earlier times the woods were coppiced, producing tool handles, hurdles and charcoal. In 1790, the estate was sold to the proprietors of the Low Moor Ironworks and the area was heavily mined for coal and ironstone. The remains of bell pits can still be found amongst the trees. About 1845, the area was replanted with beech trees, together with some oak and sycamore trees.

The woods are named after Judy North, who lived nearby in the 1850s and 1860s, and whose family had managed part of the site since the early 19th century. In the 1920s, Bradford Corporation bought the land and the woods were opened to the public. In 2025 the site was designated as a local nature reserve.
