= Craig Whittaker =

British politician (born 1962)

The Right Honourable Craig Whittaker
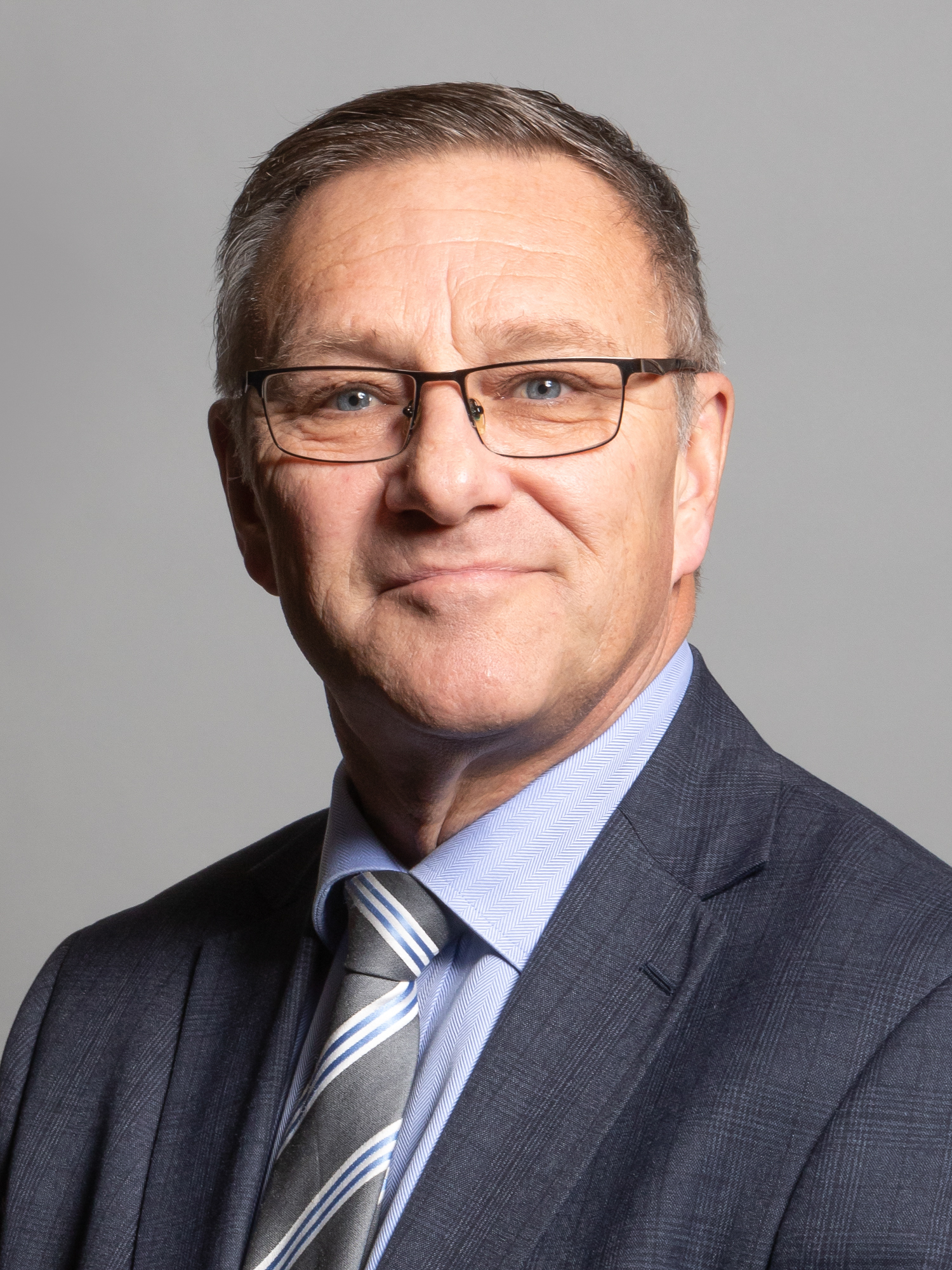
- Official portrait, 2020

Government Deputy Chief Whip Treasurer of the Household
- In office 8 September 2022 – 27 October 2022
- Prime Minister: Liz Truss
- Preceded by: Kelly Tolhurst
- Succeeded by: Marcus Jones

Lord Commissioner of the Treasury
- In office 8 July 2022 – 7 September 2022
- Prime Minister: Boris Johnson
- Preceded by: Lee Rowley
- In office 9 January 2018 – 16 April 2019
- Prime Minister: Theresa May
- Preceded by: Mark Spencer
- Succeeded by: Alister Jack

Vice-Chamberlain of the Household
- In office 16 April 2019 – 28 July 2019
- Prime Minister: Theresa May
- Preceded by: Andrew Stephenson
- Succeeded by: Stuart Andrew

Member of Parliament for Calder Valley
- In office 6 May 2010 – 30 May 2024
- Preceded by: Christine McCafferty
- Succeeded by: Josh Fenton-Glynn

Personal details
- Born: Craig Whittaker; 30 August 1962 (age 63) Radcliffe, Lancashire, England
- Party: Conservative
- Spouse: Elaine Wilkinson
- Children: 3

Craig Whittaker (born 30 August 1962) is a British Conservative Party politician who served as the Member of Parliament (MP) for Calder Valley from 2010 to 2024. He served as Government Deputy Chief Whip and Treasurer of the Household from September to October 2022. He previously served as a Lord Commissioner of the Treasury from January 2018 to April 2019 and again from July to September 2022.

Whittaker served as the Parliamentary Private Secretary (PPS) to Karen Bradley, the Secretary of State for Culture, Media and Sport. He was appointed in the reshuffle of January 2018 as HM Lord Commissioner of the Treasury in the Government Whips Office, serving until April 2019 when he was appointed Vice-Chamberlain of the Household. Prior to his role at the Treasury, he served as an Assistant Whip. Whittaker was appointed to that role in June 2017 following the snap general election.

== Early life and career ==
Craig Whittaker was born on 30 August 1962 in Radcliffe, Greater Manchester. Whittaker emigrated to Australia at the age of five with his parents. In 1984, he returned to England and settled in Yorkshire. His father was a boiler maker and his mother a seamstress. He was a Retail General Manager for a high street retailer and was involved in Retail Management from leaving high school in Australia, after completing his Higher School Certificate. He was the Branch Manager at Wilkinson for six years and then became the Retail General Manager for PC World for an eleven-year period until 2009. During his time living in Heptonstall, a village in the borough, he served on the Parish Council from 1998 to 2003.

In 2003, Whittaker was elected for the Conservative Party to Calderdale Council for the Brighouse Ward, gaining the seat from the Labour Party. He stood down from the Council at the 2004 local elections. In 2007, he was once again elected to Calderdale Council, this time for the neighbouring ward of Rastrick, securing 1,336 votes for the Conservatives and increasing the Party's majority. During this period, Whittaker served as the Cabinet Member for Children & Young People. Whittaker is a former Chair of the Calder Valley Conservatives and a former Conservative Party agent who managed the unsuccessful 2005 general election campaign of Liz Truss, then the Conservative parliamentary candidate for Calder Valley.

== Parliamentary career ==
Whittaker was selected to be the Conservative Party's candidate for Calder Valley in March 2007. At the 2010 general election, he was elected as MP for Calder Valley with 39.4% of the vote and a majority of 6,431.

Whittaker served on the Education Select Committee in the 2010–2015 Parliament. He set up a charity, Together for Lookeing after Children, to support the life chances of children in care in Calderdale, which he discussed in his maiden speech in Parliament in 2010. During his time on the committee, he spoke out against the Government on occasion and criticised policy in relation to transferring responsibility for careers advice to schools, describing it as a "bit of a pigs ear". He also served as chair for the Parliamentary group for children in care.

Whittaker was one of 79 Conservative MPs who supported a 2011 rebel motion calling for a referendum on the EU.

In May 2012, he argued against legalising same sex-marriage on the basis it could lead to successive governments supporting polygamy or "three way marriages".

He also joined a 2013 rebel amendment expressing regret at not including the referendum in the government's plans.

In the run up to the 2015 general election, Whittaker was criticised on social media for sharing, via a tweet, a Daily Mail newspaper column by Richard Littlejohn headlined "Vote Labour? I'd rather trust Jimmy Savile to babysit". Whittaker was re-elected as MP for Calder Valley at the 2015 general election with an increased vote share of 43.6% and a decreased majority of 4,427.

In June 2015, he was appointed as Parliamentary Private Secretary (PPS) to the Immigration Minister James Brokenshire. He was subsequently appointed as PPS to the Secretary of State for Culture, Media and Sport, Karen Bradley.

Whittaker supported Remain during the 2016 EU membership referendum. Following the referendum he said he supported the result and the government's position on triggering Article 50.

At the snap 2017 general election, Whittaker was again re-elected with an increased vote share of 46.1% and a decreased majority of 609.

In October 2019, Whittaker was among 11 West Yorkshire MPs to urge the government go ahead with the Leeds branch of the HS2 railway.

Whittaker was again re-elected at the 2019 general election, with an increased vote share of 51.9% and an increased majority of 5,774.

In July 2020, Whittaker said that BAME people in the United Kingdom were responsible for increases in COVID-19 cases and that they were failing to exercise precaution, stating in a radio interview with LBC that: "If you look at the areas where we've seen rises and cases, the vast majority – but not by any stretch of the imagination all areas – it is the BAME communities that are not taking this seriously enough". He pointed to Muslim, immigrant and Asian communities particularly in West Yorkshire. The Muslim Council of Britain criticised Whittaker's claims.

In March 2022, Whittaker argued against reform of the gambling industry during a Westminster Hall debate. Despite this, he had accepted Euro 2020 tickets worth more than £3,000 from Entain, which owns a number of betting companies including Coral, Partypoker and Ladbrokes.

Whittaker was appointed as deputy chief whip, serving under chief whip Wendy Morton, on 7 September 2022, after Liz Truss became prime minister. During the October government crisis, Whittaker and Morton were thought to have resigned after a contentious vote on fracking plunged the government into further turmoil. Morton and Whittaker, in the event, were not replaced by Truss and stayed in their posts until after Truss's own resignation less than 48 hours later. After Rishi Sunak became prime minister, Whittaker was replaced as deputy chief whip on 27 October 2022 by Marcus Jones.

In March 2023, he announced that he would stand down at the 2024 general election.

In November 2023, Whittaker criticized the Gambling Commission in an article published by ConservativeHome, arguing that "all too often [the Commission] takes a heavy-handed approach to their work". Over the course of 2023 Whittaker received more than £8,000 in hospitality and payments from the betting industry.

== Personal life ==
Whittaker is a member of the Church of Jesus Christ of Latter-day Saints and lives with his wife, businesswoman Elaine Wilkinson, in Rastrick. The couple married in the Chapel of St Mary Undercroft at the Palace of Westminster in August 2011.

In 2012 he was arrested for an alleged assault on his 24-year-old son outside a petrol station. The Crown Prosecution Service later said there were no grounds for further action.

His daughter Sophie is a Conservative councillor for Rastrick ward on Calderdale council. In June 2015, Craig Whittaker reported employing his daughter as a part-time Constituency Support Officer on a salary just under £20,000. He then promoted Sophie to a full-time position as Executive Office Manager, reporting this in July 2019.

In March 2023, he was appointed as a member of the Privy Council.

Since retiring as an MP, Whittaker expressed his desire to ride the Silk Road by motorbike.

Parliament of the United Kingdom
Preceded by Christine McCafferty	Member of Parliament for Calder Valley; 2010–2024	Succeeded by Josh Fenton-Glynn
Party political offices
Preceded by Kelly Tolhurst	Conservative Deputy Chief Whip in the House of Commons; 2022	Succeeded by Marcus Jones
