= Donald Thompson (British politician) =

British politician (1931–2005)

Member of Parliament for Calder Valley Sowerby (1979–1983)
- In office 3 May 1979 – 8 April 1997
- Preceded by: Max Madden
- Succeeded by: Christine McCafferty

Personal details
- Born: 3 November 1931
- Died: 14 March 2005 (aged 73)
- Party: Conservative

Sir Donald Thompson (3 November 1931 – 14 March 2005) was a British Conservative Party politician. He was a Member of Parliament (MP) from 1979 until 1997.

Thompson attended Trinity Academy, Halifax, and Hipperholme Grammar School. Following National service he ran a farm near Halifax then joined the family butcher business of his father, Geoff Thompson, known for its black puddings. His mother, Rachel, had worked as a weaver from the age of 12 until her marriage. Thompson expanded the business considerably and also developed a successful plastics manufacturing business.

Thompson became involved in politics at a young age, setting up Halifax Young Conservatives. He became a county councillor for the West Riding from 1967, joining the new West Yorkshire county council in 1974, then Calderdale district council from 1975 until 1979. He first stood for Parliament at the 1970 general election for the safe Labour seat of Batley and Morley. He stood in the marginal seat of Sowerby in both the February 1974 and October 1974 elections, losing by small margins. In the 1979 election he stood again in Sowerby, beating Max Madden by 1,180. At the 1983 general election, the seat was adjusted and renamed Calder Valley.

Thompson was known as a solid, stout, no-nonsense Yorkshireman. He worked his way up through the whips office before joining the Ministry of Agriculture, Fisheries and Food as a junior minister. He was sacked in 1989 but bore no resentment against Margaret Thatcher, telling his colleagues: "There is no iceberg here, but a shire horse unharnessed and put out to grass on blue Conservative grass."

At the last Prime Minister's Questions given by Margaret Thatcher in November 1990 he famously said that if the Prime Minister visited his constituency, she would find scores of people telling her what they had told him, that she "was a good 'un."

Thompson was knighted in the 1992 New Year Honours. He lost his seat in the 1997 Labour landslide. He was married in 1957 to Patricia Hopkins, with whom he had two sons.

In July 1997, following the loss of his seat in parliament, Thompson was appointed Director of the War Memorials Trust (then known as The Friends of War Memorials), a charity which he had helped to found in 1996. He held the post until his death in 2005, aged 73.

Parliament of the United Kingdom
Preceded by Max Madden	Member of Parliament for Sowerby; 1979–1983	Constituency abolished
New constituency	Member of Parliament for Calder Valley; 1983–1997	Succeeded by Christine McCafferty
