= Bailiff Bridge railway station =

Disused railway station in West Yorkshire, England

Bailiff Bridge
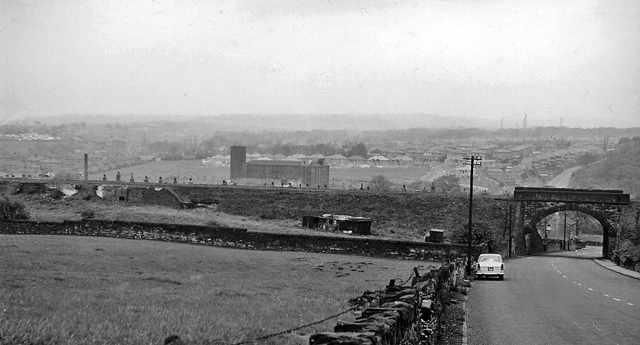
- Site of Bailiff Bridge railway station in 1961

General information
- Location: Brighouse, Calderdale; England
- Coordinates: 53.7222°N 1.7725°W
- Grid reference: SE151251
- Platforms: 2

Other information
- Status: Disused

History
- Original company: West Riding Union
- Pre-grouping: Lancashire and Yorkshire Railway

Key dates
- 1 March 1881: Station opens
- 2 April 1917: Station closes
Location

Bailiff Bridge railway station was built by the Lancashire and Yorkshire Railway to serve the village of Bailiff Bridge north of Brighouse in West Yorkshire, England.

== History ==
Opened by the Lancashire and Yorkshire Railway, the station was then closed during the First World War as an economy measure. The route continued in use until mining subsidence caused the closure of the line in 1952.

Preceding station	Disused railways	Following station
Wyke and Norwood Green	Lancashire and Yorkshire Railway; Pickle Bridge Line	Clifton Road
