= Josh Fenton-Glynn =

British politician (born 1983)

Josh Fenton-Glynn MP
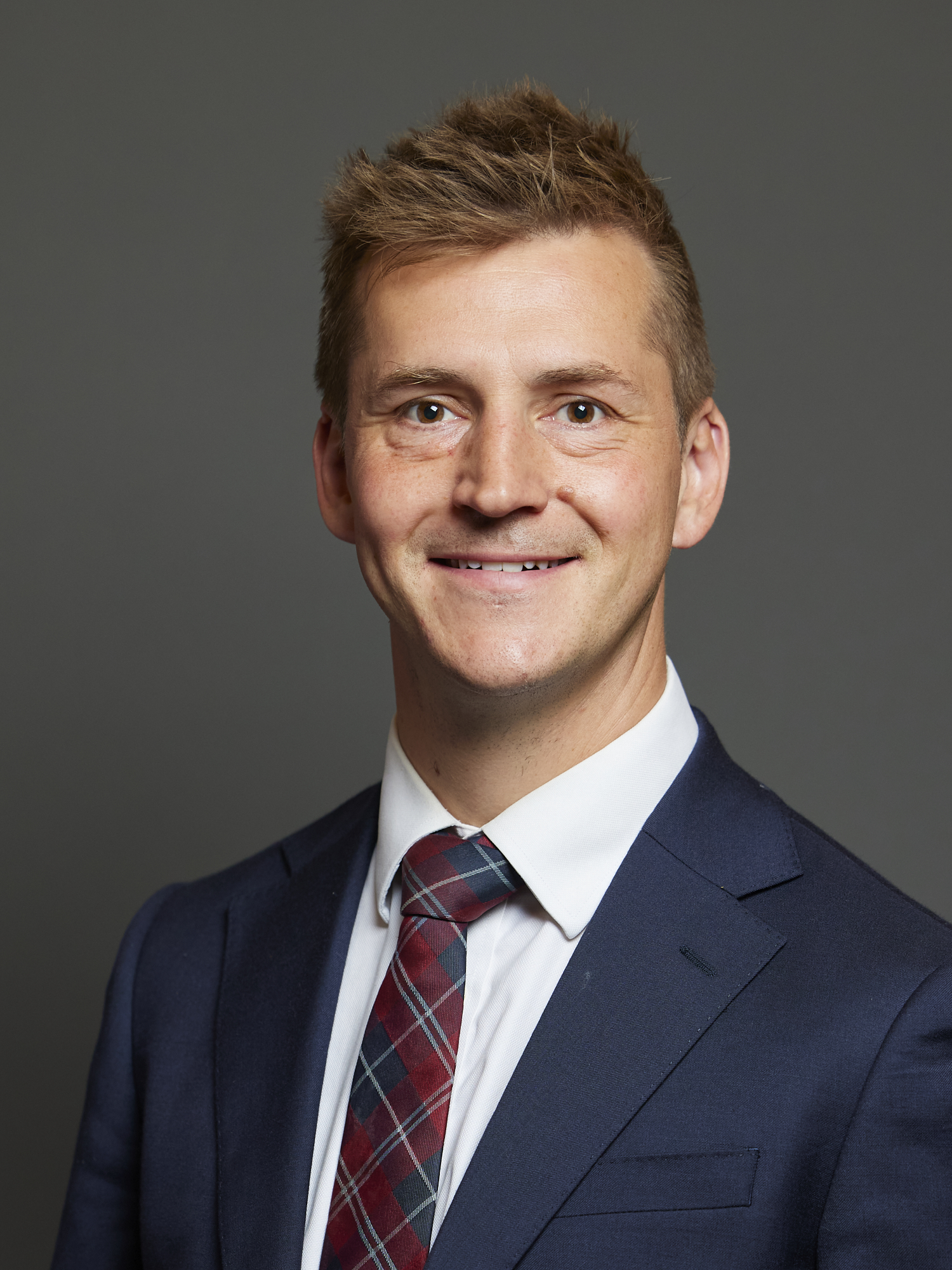
- Official portrait, 2024

Member of Parliament for Calder Valley
- Incumbent
- Assumed office 4 July 2024
- Preceded by: Craig Whittaker
- Majority: 8,991 (11.1%)

Member of Calderdale Council for Calder
- In office 5 May 2016 – 14 September 2024
- Preceded by: Janet Battye
- Succeeded by: Jonathan Timbers

Personal details
- Born: Joshua Fenton-Glynn; 31 December 1983 (age 42)
- Party: Labour
- Occupation: Politician
- Website: joshfentonglynn.co.uk

Joshua Fenton-Glynn (born 31 December 1983) is a British politician. A member of the Labour Party, he has been Member of Parliament for Calder Valley since 2024.

== Early life ==
Fenton-Glynn was born on 31 December 1983, in Hebden Bridge. He attended Calder High School and studied at the University of Liverpool.

Fenton-Glynn worked for Oxfam, Child Poverty Action Group, the Public and Commercial Services Union, USDAW, Church Action on Poverty, and the General Medical Council.

== Political career ==
In 2016, Fenton-Glynn was elected for Labour to Calderdale Metropolitan Borough Council for the Calder ward, and served as cabinet member for Adult Health and Social Care 2021–2024. He unsuccessfully stood in the 2015, 2017, and 2019 general elections for Calder Valley before being elected in the 2024 general election. He gained his seat from the Conservatives.

Since 2024, Fenton-Glynn has served as a member of the Health and Social Care Select Committee. His former secondary school science teacher, Allison Gardner, is a fellow Labour MP. In an interview with the two, Fenton-Glynn stated he still calls her "miss".

Fenton-Glynn opposed a proposed wind farm in Wadsworth, West Yorkshire, due to the habitat destruction its construction would bring. He was critical of Keir Starmer and called for his resignation.

== Personal life ==
Fenton-Glynn has two children. As of 2026, he has ran a total of seven marathons, including the 2025 and 2026 London Marathons. In January 2025, his brother, Alex English, died from high-grade acinic cell carcinoma. He ran in the 2026 Marathon in his memory.

Parliament of the United Kingdom
Preceded by Craig Whittaker	Member of Parliament for Calder Valley; 2024–present	Incumbent
