= Cooper Bridge railway station =

Disused railway station in West Yorkshire, England

Cooper Bridge
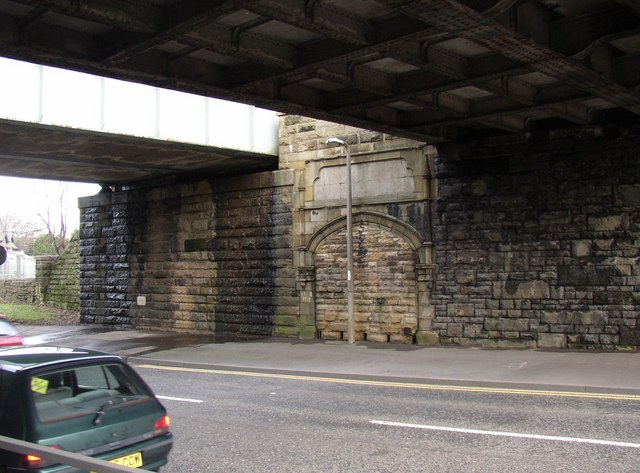
- Blocked entrance to former railway station, Cooper Bridge Road.

General information
- Location: Mirfield, Kirklees; England
- Coordinates: 53.68487°N 1.732°W
- Grid reference: SE177209
- Platforms: 2

Other information
- Status: Disused

History
- Original company: Manchester and Leeds Railway
- Pre-grouping: Lancashire and Yorkshire Railway
- Post-grouping: London, Midland and Scottish Railway

Key dates
- 1 October 1840: Station opens
- 20 February 1950: Station closes
Location

Cooper Bridge was a railway station built by the Manchester and Leeds Railway to serve the town of Huddersfield in West Yorkshire, England.

== History ==
Opened by the Manchester and Leeds Railway in 1840 to serve Huddersfield, 4 miles (6.4 km) away, which at that time did not have a station of its own.

It is sometimes wrongly claimed that the station was built for and by, the owner of Kirklees Hall the Armytage family, although they were in fact investors in the rival Huddersfield & Manchester Railway.

Preceding station	Historical railways	Following station
Clifton Road	Lancashire and Yorkshire Railway; Pickle Bridge Line	Mirfield
Brighouse	Lancashire and Yorkshire Railway; Calder Valley line	Mirfield
