= Pickle Bridge line =

Disused railway in West Yorkshire, England

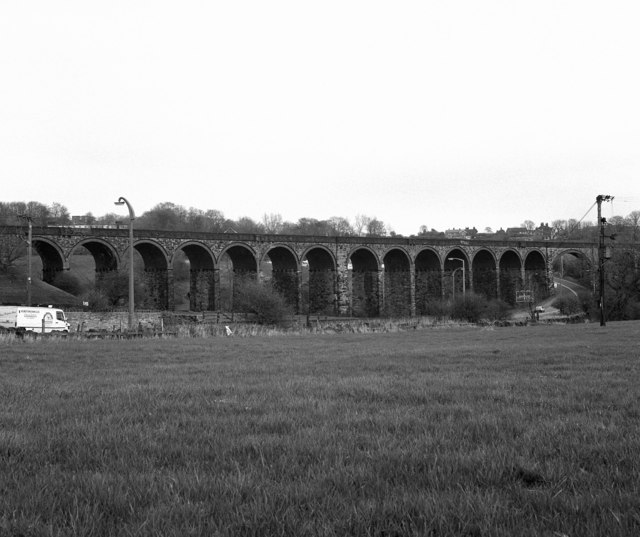
- Wyke Viaduct in 1987, shortly before demolition

Overview
- Status: Closed
- Locale: West Yorkshire, England
- Stations: 2

Service
- Type: Heavy rail

History
- Opened: 1 March 1881
- Closed: 2 August 1952

Technical
- Line length: 3.75-mile (6.04 km)
- Track gauge: 1,435 mm (4 ft 8 1/2 in) standard gauge
Route map
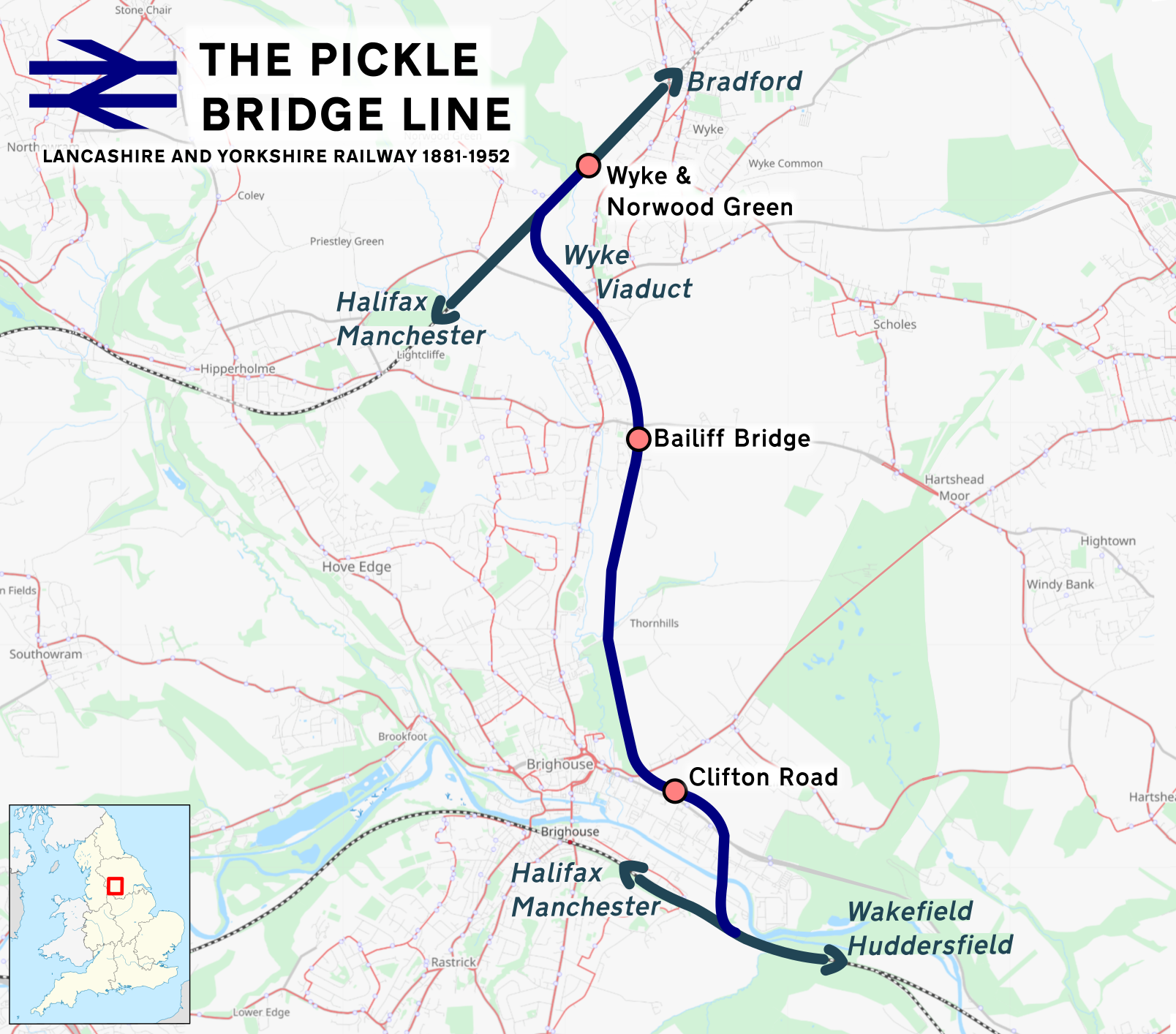
(Click to expand)

The Pickle Bridge line is a disused railway route in Northern England that ran between Huddersfield and Bradford. It opened to traffic in 1881 with two intermediate stations; Baliff Bridge and Clifton Road (Brighouse). The line closed to passengers in 1948, and closed completely in August 1952.

== History ==
The line was first authorised by the West Riding Union Railways Act 1846 (9 & 10 Vict. c. cccxc) as part of the West Riding Union Railways. However, before any work started, the scheme became part of the Lancashire and Yorkshire Railway (L&YR) who showed no interest in constructing the line. However, with the threat of other railway companies entering into their territory and building lines, the L&YR pressed ahead with the line submitting applications to Parliament in 1865, and an amended one in 1873. The proposal was partly advantageous for the L&YR as it offered an alternative for trains between Bradford and Huddersfield, as before the line was built, the L&YR services a lengthy detour via Halifax. Construction started in May 1874, though the line did not open until 1 March 1881. The line took its name from the station at the northern end of the line, and this name persisted even when this station was moved and was also renamed to Wyke and Norwood Green.

Stopping passenger services on the line ceased calling at Baliff Bridge in April 1917 due to a wartime economy measure, and at Clifton Road (Brighouse) in September 1931. A direct service between Bradford and Huddersfield typically called at Low Moor, Wyke & Norwood Green, Clifton Road, and finally Huddersfield, taking 34 minutes end to end. A long-distance service connecting Bradford Exchange and London Marylebone was routed over the Pickle Bridge line in 1900. It was later diverted onto the Spen Valley Line from Low Moor, and in 1948, was named as the South Yorkshireman.

All through passenger services were re-routed away from the Pickle Bridge line onto the Spen Valley Line in 1948, and the entire route was closed in August 1952.

=== Wyke Viaduct ===
Wyke viaduct (locally known as Red Lion viaduct) was by far the largest engineering feature on the line, a 22 arch 270-yard (250 m) stone construction built by Hawkshaw & Meek. Unfortunately it was an unnecessary diversion around an unfriendly landowner across unsuitable ground. It suffered from subsidence due to local mine workings and a speed limit was imposed, followed by diversion of all passenger services in 1948, and complete closure of the line in 1952. The viaduct continued to deteriorate and British Rail applied for permission to partly demolish it, as by this time it was grade II listed. This permission was granted and the 14 arches at the northern end of the viaduct were demolished in 1987. It was previously managed by BRB (Residuary) Ltd., but now by National Highways as part of the Historical Railways Estate.

== The route ==
The 3.75-mile (6.04 km) line began at Anchor Pit Junction between Brighouse and Cooper Bridge on what is now the Calder Valley line, but which was at that time the Manchester & Leeds Calder Valley main line and continued on an average gradient of 1-in-70 (south to north) as follows:

- Heading west and diverging north at Anchor Pit Junction.
- Crossing the River Calder and swinging west to:
- Clifton Road (Opened 1 March 1881, closed 14 September 1931, demolished 1934).
- Heading north over a 5 arch viaduct at Thornhills and continuing north to:
- Bailiff Bridge (Opened 1 March 1881, closed 1917, burned down 1929).
- Crossing over Wyke Viaduct (partly demolished 1987).
- Swinging north east and joining the current Calder Valley line at Pickle Bridge junction between Wyke and Norwood Green and Lightcliffe station.

== Re-use ==
The line was reassessed as a possible route for part of the Northern Powerhouse Rail project. This would see the line through Bradford be linked directly to Huddersfield. The plan was discounted on account of there not being enough capacity between Wyke and Bradford on the existing route. In 2021, members of the West Yorkshire Combined Authority voted to move forward with a scheme to improve connections between Bradford and Huddersfield. Part of this was the conversion of the former line between Wyke Lion and Brighouse to a greenway.
