= Lightcliffe railway station =

Former railway station in West Yorkshire, England

Lightcliffe
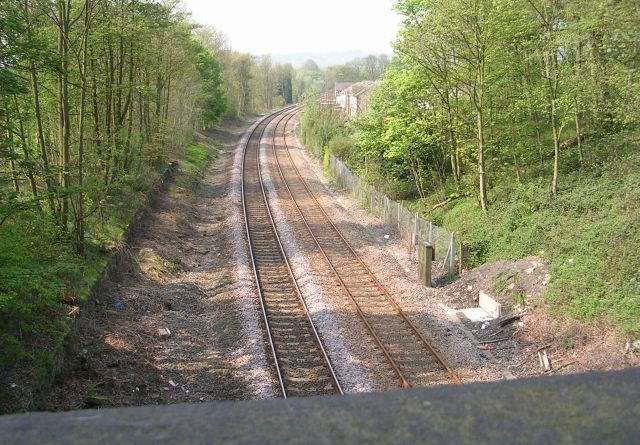
- Site of the former Lightcliffe railway station. The platforms were either side of the line in the foreground up to the base of the bridge.

General information
- Location: Lightcliffe, Calderdale; England
- Coordinates: 53.7250°N 1.7992°W
- Grid reference: SE133254
- Platforms: 2

Other information
- Status: Disused

History
- Pre-grouping: Lancashire and Yorkshire Railway
- Post-grouping: London, Midland and Scottish Railway

Key dates
- 1850: opened
- 1965: closed
Location

Lightcliffe railway station served the village of Lightcliffe in West Yorkshire, England. It was opened in August 1850 and was a victim of the Beeching cuts on 14 June 1965.

Preceding station	Disused railways	Following station
Hipperholme	L&Y; Caldervale line	Wyke and Norwood Green
