= Christine McCafferty =

British politician (born 1945)

Member of Parliament for Calder Valley
- In office 1 May 1997 – 12 April 2010
- Preceded by: Sir Donald Thompson
- Succeeded by: Craig Whittaker

Personal details
- Born: 14 October 1945 (age 80) Manchester, Lancashire, England
- Party: Labour
- Spouse: David Tarlo

Christine McCafferty (née Livesley; born 14 October 1945) is a British Labour Party politician who was Member of Parliament (MP) for Calder Valley from 1997 to 2010 when she retired.

== Early life ==
Born in Manchester, she attended Whalley Range High School in Whalley Range, Manchester, then Footscray High School in Melbourne, Australia. She worked as welfare worker for disabled people for the Manchester Community Health Service from 1963 to 1970. From 1970 to 1972, she was an education welfare officer for the Manchester Education Committee. From 1978 to 1980, she was Registrar of Marriages for Bury registration district. From 1989 to 1997, she was a project manager for Calderdale Well Woman Centre.

Before her election to parliament, McCafferty was a member of Hebden Royd Town Council 1991–95. She was also a councillor on Calderdale Metropolitan Borough Council 1991–7, where she was chair of the Adoption Panel 1992–6. She served as member of the West Yorkshire Police Authority 1994–7.

== Parliamentary career ==
McCafferty was selected as a New Labour candidate through an all-women shortlist. She was elected in the 1997 Labour landslide, replacing the Conservative Sir Donald Thompson who had held the seat since 1979. Her election was subject of the book This England by Pete Davies. She held the seat in the 2001 and 2005 general elections despite Tory resurgence.

In Parliament, she was a member of the Procedure Committee 1997–9, and of the International Development Committee 2001–5. Since 1999, she has also been a member of the Parliamentary Assembly of the Council of Europe, chairing the All-Party Parliamentary Group on Population, Development and Reproductive Health. She was the author of the McCafferty Report, which proposed to limit the freedom of medical professionals to decline to perform controversial medical practices, such as abortion, in order to insure access to medical treatment. The initiative was ultimately defeated when, on 7 October 2010, a narrow majority of Members adopted a number of amendments that turned it into its opposite: it now re-affirms the free exercise of conscientious objection, instead of restricting it.

McCafferty was one of the Labour rebel MPs that voted against British involvement in the 2003 invasion of Iraq. Later that year she voted against the hospital reform bill that introduced NHS foundation trusts.

In 2007, McCafferty announced that she would retire at the next general election.

== Personal life ==
McCafferty married Michael McCafferty, with whom she had one son. Later she remarried to David Tarlo.

Parliament of the United Kingdom
Preceded by Donald Thompson	Member of Parliament for Calder Valley; 1997–2010	Succeeded by Craig Whittaker
