= Clifton Road railway station =

Disused railway station in West Yorkshire, England

Clifton Road
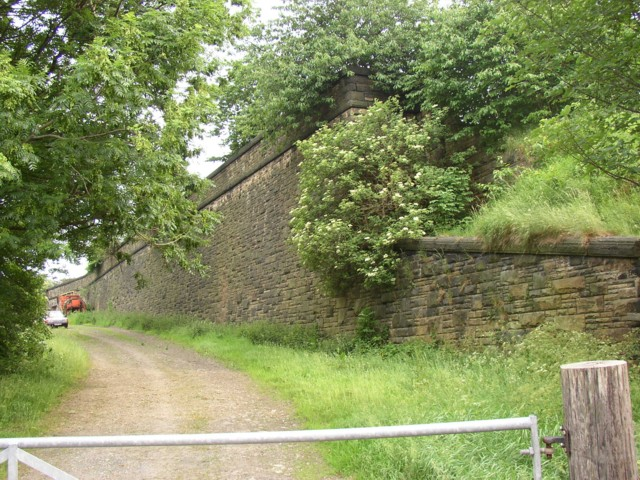
- Station Road leading to the site of Clifton Road railway station.

General information
- Location: Brighouse, Calderdale; England
- Coordinates: 53.701260°N 1.770120°W
- Grid reference: SE152227
- Platforms: 2

Other information
- Status: Disused

History
- Original company: West Riding Union
- Pre-grouping: Lancashire and Yorkshire Railway
- Post-grouping: London, Midland and Scottish Railway

Key dates
- 1 March 1881: Station opens.
- 1931: Station closes.
- 1934: Station demolished.
Location

Clifton Road was a railway station built by the Lancashire and Yorkshire Railway to serve the village of Clifton north east of Brighouse in West Yorkshire, England.

== History ==
Opened by the Lancashire and Yorkshire Railway in 1881 and closed in 1931. The line continued in use until subsidence caused the closure of the line in 1952.

Preceding station	Disused railways	Following station
Bailiff Bridge	Lancashire and Yorkshire Railway; Pickle Bridge Line	Cooper Bridge
