= Brighouse railway station =

Railway station in West Yorkshire, England

Brighouse
- Platform 1

General information
- Location: Brighouse, Calderdale; England
- Coordinates: 53.698°N 1.779°W
- Grid reference: SE146224
- Manager: Northern Trains
- Transit authority: West Yorkshire Metro
- Platforms: 2

Other information
- Station code: BGH
- Fare zone: 4
- Classification: DfT category F1

History
- Original company: Manchester & Leeds Railway
- Pre-grouping: Lancashire & Yorkshire Railway
- Post-grouping: London, Midland & Scottish Railway

Key dates
- 1840: Opened
- 4 January 1970: Closed
- 28 May 2000: Reopened

Passengers
- 2020/21: ▼89,736
- 2021/22: ▲0.287 million
- 2022/23: ▲0.330 million
- 2023/24: ▲0.368 million
- Interchange: 47,397
- 2024/25: ▲0.388 million
- Interchange: ▼36,630
Location
Notes
- Passenger statistics from the Office of Rail & Road

Brighouse railway station serves the town of Brighouse and neighbouring village of Rastrick in West Yorkshire, England. The station lies on the Calder Valley line running west from Leeds. Opened in 1840, and closed in 1970, it reopened in 2000 and is served by Northern Trains towards Leeds, Huddersfield and Wigan Wallgate, and by Grand Central services between Bradford Interchange and London King's Cross.

== History ==
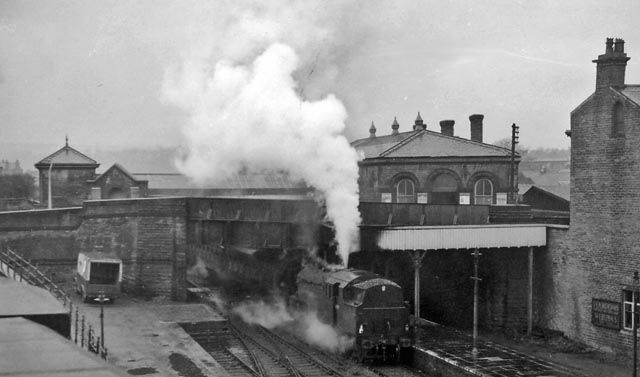
The station in 1961

Brighouse railway station was first opened on 5 October 1840, as a main line station operated by the Manchester & Leeds Railway (M&L). The station was initially known as Brighouse for Bradford, as no stations had yet been built in Bradford itself. Similarly, Elland station served Halifax, and Huddersfield was served by the station at Cooper Bridge.

A lithograph was produced by Arthur Fitzwilliam Tait showing the station in 1845.

In 1847 Brighouse station came under the control of the Lancashire & Yorkshire Railway (L&Y), when the M&L was incorporated into that company. The station remained under L&Y operation until it was incorporated into the London, Midland & Scottish Railway in 1923. The station's importance had gradually declined because other lines connecting Manchester and Leeds were built via Halifax and Huddersfield, bypassing Brighouse.

Brighouse station passed into British Railways ownership upon nationalisation in 1948, and was operated as part of the North Eastern Region. The decline in passenger numbers continued, and the station closed on 5 January 1970. The line remained open throughout that time as a freight-only one, but it was also used as a diversionary route for passenger trains when other lines were closed.

Brighouse station reopened on 28 May 2000. It also serves the town of Elland some 2 miles (3 km) away. Plans for a station in Elland to open at the same time as Brighouse were cancelled due to lack of funds.

On opening the station was served by one train per hour running to Leeds via Halifax and Bradford, and one train per hour in the other direction to Huddersfield. Trains called every two hours on Sundays.

From 27 April 2008 a bus service MC4 provided a connection with most Leeds via Dewsbury trains to/from Elland. This was replaced in early 2010 by a revised service E8.

In December 2008, the service was supplemented by an hourly Leeds - Dewsbury - Hebden Bridge - Manchester Victoria - Southport stopping service (Monday - Saturday daytime only, no late evening or Sunday service). This provided a considerable service improvement providing both a twice-hourly frequency for journeys to/from Leeds and a reduction in journey time taking only 35 minutes to travel to Leeds via Dewsbury rather than 50 minutes via Halifax. Even without this important improvement in services, usage of the station has increased year on year since the reopening. Some services from Leeds terminate at Brighouse and start back from here.

In May 2010, Grand Central's Bradford Interchange to London service commenced.

In May 2018, the Sunday service from Leeds to Huddersfield via Brighouse was doubled in frequency to one per hour in each direction.

== Services ==
In the Winter 2025 timetable, Brighouse has two trains per hour to Leeds via Dewsbury, one to Bradford Interchange via Halifax and one to Manchester Victoria and Wigan Wallgate via Hebden Bridge. No rail service operates to Huddersfield, as the station there has no terminating facilities for such trains while the Transpennine Route Upgrade (TRU) project is ongoing. A replacement bus service is in operation until January 2027. The Wigan to Leeds service doesn't run on Sundays.

In addition to the regular service pattern, there are four direct return services per day to London King's Cross via Wakefield Kirkgate and Doncaster, including Sundays.

From the December 2019 timetable change, the Leeds via Halifax service now terminates at Bradford Interchange on weekdays and Saturdays (it still operates through on Sundays).

TransPennine Express services call here instead of Huddersfield during times when engineering works on the Transpennine Route Upgrade affect the Huddersfield to Manchester line and when Huddersfield railway station is closed; a free replacement bus service is put in place between Brighouse and Huddersfield during these times for Huddersfield bound passengers, this bus takes approximately 15–20 minutes.

Preceding station	National Rail	Following station
Sowerby Bridge	Northern Calder Valley line	Mirfield
Huddersfield	Northern Calder Valley line	Halifax
Mirfield	Grand Central; Calder Valley line	Halifax
Manchester Piccadilly	TransPennine Express North TransPennine Route	Leeds
Manchester Victoria	TransPennine Express North TransPennine Route	Leeds
Disused railways
Elland	L&YR	Cooper Bridge
Elland	L&YR	Bradley West Yorkshire

== Station facilities ==
The station has two platforms.

- Platform 1: served by services towards Huddersfield, Leeds (via Dewsbury), Wakefield Kirkgate, Doncaster and London Kings Cross
- Platform 2: served by services towards Wigan Wallgate, Manchester Victoria, and Leeds (via Halifax and Bradford Interchange).

Northern Rail and West Yorkshire Metro secured joint funding from the Department for Transport's Access for All – Small Schemes initiative to provide a new Customer Information System at the station.

New LCD style passenger information screens with real-time information have been fitted on both platforms linked into an improved public address system providing accurate, reliable audio/visual train running information to passengers.

In addition; Northern has announced plans to replace the station's HelpPoint intercom system with a more updated reliable model. This will let passengers speak to a member of staff in Northern's control centre for information or to summon assistance in emergency situations.

== Station panorama ==
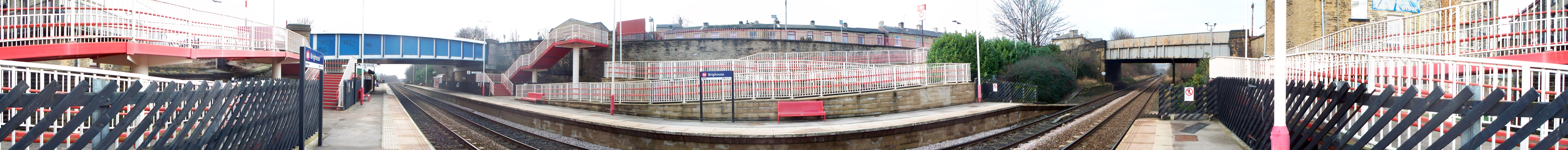
Panorama of Brighouse station in February 2009

== Filming location ==
The station features in the award-winning BBC comedy The Thick of It, series 4 episode 4 (from minute 21).
