= Calder Valley (constituency) =

UK Parliament constituency (since 1983)

Coordinates: 53.705°N 1.937°W

- County constituency for the House of Commons
- Interactive map of boundaries from 2024
- Boundary of Calder Valley in Yorkshire and the Humber
- County: West Yorkshire
- Population: 102,961 (2011 census)
- Electorate: 77,504 (December 2019)
- Major settlements: Hebden Bridge, Todmorden, Brighouse, Mytholmroyd, Elland, Ripponden

Current constituency
- Created: 1983
- Member of Parliament: Josh Fenton-Glynn (Labour)
- Seats: One
- Created from: Sowerby; Brighouse and Spenborough; Halifax

Calder Valley (/ˈkɔːldər, ˈkɒl-/) is a constituency in West Yorkshire represented in the House of Commons of the UK Parliament since 2024 by Josh Fenton-Glynn of the Labour Party. (Note: As with all constituencies, the constituency elects one Member of Parliament (MP) by the first past the post system of election at least every five years.)

The constituency has a long record as a bellwether of national results in British elections. In every election since its creation for the 1983 general election, it has voted for an MP belonging to the largest party in the Commons; this record stretches back to February 1974 and 1960 for its main predecessors, Sowerby and Brighouse and Spenborough respectively.

== Constituency profile ==
The Calder Valley constituency covers most of the district of Calderdale in West Yorkshire. It contains the areas south and west of the large town of Halifax. The largest settlement is the town of Brighouse with a population of around 33,000. Other settlements in the constituency include the towns of Elland, Hebden Bridge and Todmorden and the villages of Ripponden and Mytholmroyd. The Pennines run through the west of the constituency, which is thus predominantly upland. It is named after the River Calder, a tributary of the Aire that flows through the constituency. Most of the towns in the constituency have a history of textile manufacturing. Todmorden and Hebden Bridge are known for their bohemian culture and Hebden Bridge has been described as the "lesbian capital of the UK".

Residents of the constituency are generally older and have average levels of wealth and education when compared to national averages. White people make up 95% of the population. There is some deprivation in Todmorden and Elland whilst Ripponden is more affluent. At the local borough council, Brighouse and Elland are represented by Conservative Party councillors whilst the constituency's upland west voted for Labour Party candidates. An estimated 52% of voters in Calder Valley supported leaving the European Union in the 2016 referendum, identical to the national figure.

== Boundaries ==
1983–2024: Since the constituency's creation in 1983, it comprised the Metropolitan Borough of Calderdale wards of Brighouse, Calder, Elland, Greetland and Stainland, Hipperholme and Lightcliffe, Luddendenfoot, Rastrick, Ryburn, and Todmorden.

2024–present: Same as above apart from the loss of part of the Ryburn ward (polling districts MB, MC and MD) to Halifax in order to bring the electorate within the permitted range as part of the 2023 Periodic Review of Westminster constituencies.

== History ==
The constituency was created in 1983, primarily from the former seat of Sowerby as well as parts of Brighouse and Spenborough. Historically a bellwether seat between Labour and the Conservatives, at the 2010 general election the seat became the closest three-way marginal in the north of England, with less than 1,000 votes between the Labour candidate in second place and the Liberal Democrat candidate in third, although with a significant Conservative majority. The seat's three-way marginal status did not last; the Labour vote increased significantly in both 2015 and 2017 while the Liberal Democrat vote collapsed dramatically over the same period. The seat has followed national trends, albeit with a disadvantage to the Conservatives when compared to the national swing, and is still considered a bellwether seat.

== Members of Parliament ==
Election	Member	Party
1983	Sir Donald Thompson	Conservative
1997	Christine McCafferty	Labour
2010	Craig Whittaker	Conservative
2024	Josh Fenton-Glynn	Labour

== Elections ==
=== Elections in the 2020s ===
General election 2024: Calder Valley
Party	Candidate	Votes	%	±%
Labour	Josh Fenton-Glynn	22,046	44.4	+2.1
Conservative	Vanessa Lee	13,055	26.3	−25.1
Reform	Donald Walmsley	7,644	15.4	N/A
Green	Kieran Turner	3,701	7.5	N/A
Liberal Democrats	Donal O'Hanlon	2,587	5.2	+0.1
Yorkshire	James Vasey	404	0.8	N/A
SDP	Jim McNeill	171	0.3	N/A
Majority		8,991	18.1	N/A
Turnout		49,608	64.1	−10.2
Registered electors		77,364		
Labour gain from Conservative		Swing	▲13.6	

=== Elections in the 2010s ===
2019 notional result
Party	Vote	%
Conservative	28,991	51.4
Labour	23,884	42.3
Liberal Democrats	2,858	5.1
Others	721	1.3
Turnout	56,454	74.3
Electorate	75,987	

General election 2019: Calder Valley
Party	Candidate	Votes	%	±%
Conservative	Craig Whittaker	29,981	51.9	+5.8
Labour	Josh Fenton-Glynn	24,207	41.9	−3.2
Liberal Democrats	Javed Bashir	2,884	4.9	+1.5
Liberal	Richard Phillips	721	1.2	N/A
Majority		5,774	10.0	+9.0
Turnout		57,793	72.9	−0.5
Conservative hold		Swing	+4.5	

General election 2017: Calder Valley
Party	Candidate	Votes	%	±%
Conservative	Craig Whittaker	26,790	46.1	+2.5
Labour	Josh Fenton-Glynn	26,181	45.1	+9.7
Liberal Democrats	Janet Battye	1,952	3.4	−1.6
UKIP	Paul Rogan	1,466	2.6	−8.5
Independent	Robert Holden	1,034	1.8	N/A
Green	Kieran Turner	631	1.1	−2.8
Majority		609	1.0	−7.2
Turnout		58,054	73.4	+4.5
Conservative hold		Swing	−3.6	

General election 2015: Calder Valley
Party	Candidate	Votes	%	±%
Conservative	Craig Whittaker	23,354	43.6	+4.2
Labour	Josh Fenton-Glynn	18,927	35.4	+8.4
UKIP	Paul Rogan	5,950	11.1	+8.8
Liberal Democrats	Alisdair McGregor	2,666	5.0	−20.2
Green	Jenny Shepherd	2,090	3.9	+2.2
Yorkshire First	Rod Sutcliffe	389	0.7	N/A
World Peace Through Song	Joe Stead	165	0.3	N/A
Majority		4,427	8.2	−4.0
Turnout		53,541	68.9	+1.6
Conservative hold		Swing	-2.1	

General election 2010: Calder Valley
Party	Candidate	Votes	%	±%
Conservative	Craig Whittaker	20,397	39.4	+3.6
Labour	Steph Booth	13,966	27.0	−11.5
Liberal Democrats	Hilary Myers	13,037	25.2	+6.3
BNP	John Gregory	1,823	3.5	−0.4
UKIP	Greg Burrows	1,173	2.3	N/A
Green	Kate Sweeny	858	1.7	−1.2
Independent	Tim Cole	194	0.4	N/A
Independent	Barry Greenwood	175	0.3	N/A
English Democrat	Paul Rogan	157	0.3	N/A
Majority		6,431	12.4	N/A
Turnout		51,780	67.3	+1.3
Conservative gain from Labour		Swing	+7.6	

=== Elections in the 2000s ===
General election 2005: Calder Valley
Party	Candidate	Votes	%	±%
Labour	Christine McCafferty	18,426	38.6	−4.1
Conservative	Liz Truss	17,059	35.7	−0.5
Liberal Democrats	Liz Ingleton	9,027	18.9	+2.9
BNP	John Gregory	1,887	4.0	N/A
Green	Paul Palmer	1,371	2.9	+0.7
Majority		1,367	2.9	−3.6
Turnout		47,770	67.0	+4.0
Labour hold		Swing	−1.8	

General election 2001: Calder Valley
Party	Candidate	Votes	%	±%
Labour	Christine McCafferty	20,244	42.7	−3.4
Conservative	Susan Robson-Catling	17,150	36.2	+1.1
Liberal Democrats	Michael Taylor	7,596	16.0	+1.3
Green	Steven Hutton	1,034	2.2	+1.3
UKIP	John Nunn	729	1.5	N/A
Legalise Cannabis	Philip Lockwood	672	1.4	N/A
Majority		3,094	6.5	−4.5
Turnout		47,425	63.0	−12.4
Labour hold		Swing	−2.3	

=== Elections in the 1990s ===
General election 1997: Calder Valley
Party	Candidate	Votes	%	±%
Labour	Christine McCafferty	26,050	46.1	+8.7
Conservative	Donald Thompson	19,795	35.1	−10.3
Liberal Democrats	Stephen Pearson	8,322	14.7	−1.4
Referendum	Anthony Mellor	1,380	2.4	N/A
Green	Vivienne Smith	488	0.9	−0.1
BNP	Christian Jackson	431	0.8	N/A
Majority		6,255	11.0	N/A
Turnout		56,466	75.4	−6.7
Labour gain from Conservative		Swing	+9.5	

General election 1992: Calder Valley
Party	Candidate	Votes	%	±%
Conservative	Donald Thompson	27,753	45.4	+1.9
Labour	David Chaytor	22,875	37.4	+4.0
Liberal Democrats	Stephen Pearson	9,842	16.1	−7.0
Green	Vivienne Smith	622	1.0	N/A
Majority		4,878	8.0	−2.1
Turnout		61,092	82.1	+1.0
Conservative hold		Swing	−1.1	

=== Elections in the 1980s ===
General election 1987: Calder Valley
Party	Candidate	Votes	%	±%
Conservative	Donald Thompson	25,892	43.5	−0.2
Labour	David Chaytor	19,847	33.4	+6.4
Liberal	David Shutt	13,761	23.1	−6.3
Majority		6,045	10.1	−4.2
Turnout		59,500	81.1	+2.6
Conservative hold		Swing	−3.3	

General election 1983: Calder Valley
Party	Candidate	Votes	%	±%
Conservative	Donald Thompson	24,439	43.7	
Liberal	David Shutt	16,440	29.4	
Labour	Patricia Holmes	15,108	27.0	
Majority		7,999	14.3	
Turnout		55,987	78.5	
Conservative win (new seat)				

== See also ==
- List of parliamentary constituencies in West Yorkshire

== Sources ==
- Calder Valley Election Forum
