= Suranne Jones =

British actress (born 1978)

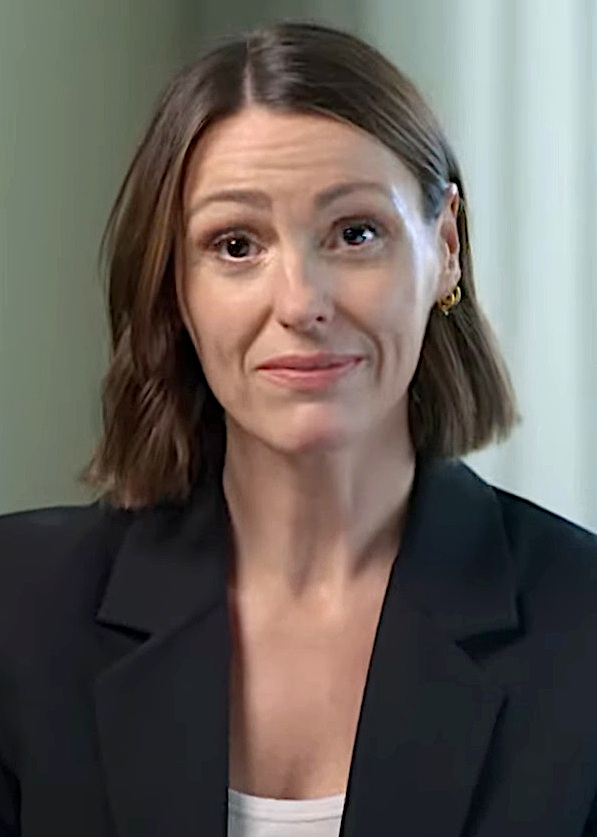
- Jones in 2023
- Born: Sarah Ann Jones; 27 August 1978 (age 48); Chadderton, Greater Manchester, England
- Occupations: Actress, producer
- Years active: 1996–present
- Known for: Coronation Street; Scott & Bailey; Doctor Foster; Gentleman Jack; Vincent
- Spouse: Laurence Akers (m. 2014)
- Children: 1

Sarah Ann Akers (née Jones; born 27 August 1978), known professionally as Suranne Jones, is an English actress and producer. Known for her numerous collaborations with screenwriter Sally Wainwright, she rose to prominence playing Karen McDonald on ITV's Coronation Street between 2000 and 2004. Upon leaving, she furthered her television career in drama series such as Vincent (2005–2006), Strictly Confidential (2006), Harley Street (2008), Unforgiven (2009), Doctor Foster (2015–2017) and Hostage (2025).

Jones starred as Detective Rachel Bailey in the police procedural Scott & Bailey (2011–2016), and garnered further attention with headline roles in Single Father, Five Days (both 2010), A Touch of Cloth (2012–2014), and The Crimson Field (2014). For her portrayal of Gemma Foster—a GP who suffers personal betrayal—in Doctor Foster (2015–2017), Jones received several awards, including the 2016 British Academy Television Award for Best Actress. Subsequent credits include Save Me (2018), Vigil (2021–present), and Gentleman Jack (2019–2022). For the latter, on which she served as executive producer, Jones was again nominated for the BAFTA TV Award for Best Actress.

On stage, Jones has appeared in productions of A Few Good Men (2005), Blithe Spirit (2009), Top Girls (2011), Beautiful Thing (2013), Orlando (2014), and Frozen (2018).

== Early life ==
Sarah Ann Jones was born on 27 August 1978 in Chadderton, Greater Manchester. She has an older brother. Jones was raised Catholic; her priest suggested to her father she be christened Sarah Ann(e) instead of Suranne, her great-grandmother's name, as Suranne was not "a proper name".

She grew up in a house on Foxdenton Lane, surrounded by two farms and their fields and commented that one of her earliest memories is of "cows looking in the window as we ate our tea". As a child, she was talkative, and later recounted that her priest would tell her, "I'm praying you can concentrate just a bit more".

Jones was educated at Cardinal Langley Roman Catholic High School in Middleton. Talking of her childhood, she commented, "I think I always wanted to be different and felt very stifled at school". She also said, "I was bullied at school and I let that get hold of me and withdrew into myself — I regret letting that happen." She became a member of the Oldham Theatre Workshop and completed a BTEC National Diploma in Performing Arts, which she felt "[wasn't] quite the same as drama school".

== Career ==
=== Early career ===
Jones began acting professionally aged 16. Andrew Billen of The Times, acknowledging her professional career beginnings at 16, wrote that "she took to the stage at 8". Jones later said that her first role was at the age of 8, in Wait Until Dark as Gloria.

Upon joining the trade union Equity, Jones took on the stage name "Suranne Jones", as her birth name was already taken, and union rules dictate that each union member must have a different name. Having obtained an agent at 15, she began to act in the theatre. Jones's television career began in 1997, with a small role in Coronation Street in April 1997 as Mandy Phillips, a girlfriend of Chris Collins (Matthew Marsden). She was then cast in a television advert for Maltesers, guest-starred in episodes of series such as City Central and had a small role in My Wonderful Life. She auditioned for the role of Charity Dingle on the soap opera Emmerdale, becoming one of the final four actresses considered for the part, although the role was eventually given to Emma Atkins. She also auditioned for the part of Geena Gregory on Coronation Street, although she felt she knew Jennifer James would win the role — which she did — upon seeing her at the auditions.

=== Coronation Street ===
In 2000, some weeks after her unsuccessful audition for Geena Gregory, Jones was contacted by Coronation Street bosses, who offered her the part of a new character. Jones took on the role of Karen Phillips (no relation to Mandy), making her first appearance on 21 June. The character, after marrying Steve McDonald (Simon Gregson), took on his surname and became Karen McDonald. Described as "a bulldog in hoop earrings" and a "Victoria Beckham wannabe", the role garnered Jones public attention, with episodes involving feuds between her and rival Tracy Barlow (Kate Ford) receiving high viewing ratings. Jones also began modelling for men's magazines such as FHM and Loaded, saying: "I was 21, and within three weeks of me joining Corrie I was in Barbados doing a bikini shoot [...] I was quite impressionable and I'd just say yes to everything because I wanted to keep my job. The press officer is saying: 'Do this and you'll be the new young funky sexy girl.' We were all doing it at that time, but I realised quite quickly that I needed to concentrate on what I was doing".

In May 2004, it was announced that Jones was to leave Coronation Street after four years of playing Karen. She described working on a soap opera as "exhausting", remarking, "I was living and breathing Karen McDonald". She made her last appearance as Karen on Boxing Day 2004. Of her tenure as Karen McDonald on Coronation Street, Jones later remarked: "I just thought, while she's brilliant and I'm enjoying her, I've got to get out".

=== 2005–2010 ===
"You have to believe you can have a life after a soap."

— Jones, in an interview with The Observer

Jones stated that upon her departure from Coronation Street, she received numerous offers to appear in reality TV programmes, which she declined, quipping: "lots of money to go off and eat a crocodile's knob, or whatever". Ignoring reality TV offers, in autumn 2005, Jones starred in ITV's detective drama series Vincent, with Ray Winstone in the title role; this was Jones's first television role since leaving Coronation Street the previous year. In the same year, she starred on the West End stage in A Few Good Men opposite Rob Lowe and John Barrowman, which earned her the Theatregoers' Choice Award for Best Supporting Actress. She also appeared in the musical special Celebrate Oliver! which was screened on BBC1. In 2006, she starred as Snow White in the pantomime Snow White and the Seven Dwarves at the Manchester Opera House alongside Justin Moorhouse and fellow Coronation Street actor John Savident. She also appeared in Kay Mellor's Strictly Confidential, in which she played a bisexual sex therapist.

On New Year's Day 2007, Jones starred in a Yorkshire- and London-based black comedy, Dead Clever with Helen Baxendale and Dean Lennox Kelly on ITV1. In autumn 2007, Jones undertook a national tour in the stage run of the film Terms of Endearment, where she played Emma, opposite Linda Gray and John Bowe. In 2008 she played Martha, one of the female leads, in the ITV medical series Harley Street. Her performance drew mixed reviews, with one critic commenting on her character's "ludicrous" received pronunciation accent; the programme's tepid critical reception, combined with poor viewer ratings, signalled its end after just one series.

In January 2009, Jones appeared in Unforgiven, a three-part drama on ITV1, where she plays Ruth Slater, a woman released from prison after serving a 15-year prison sentence for the murder of two policemen. Naturally brown-haired, Jones dyed her hair "tobacco yellow" with "big roots"; Jones joked that whilst not filming she "really should have worn a wig". Additionally, the character of Ruth wore no make-up throughout, with Jones stating she was left feeling "quite exposed", but nonetheless saying "Ruth wouldn't have worn any make-up, I don't think". Jones received favourable reviews for her portrayal, with Brian Viner of The Independent writing: "a stunning performance, the stuff of Bafta nominations if ever I saw it. Heck, on the back of it she might even get propelled into the movies, and bring a bit of North Country sense to the Golden Globes". Viner summarised his review of Unforgiven by stating, "Five stars all round, and six for Jones". Jones later stated, "I loved that role. They don't come along that often. It was seen by the broadsheets as well as the tabloids. It gave me a little bit of credibility, I suppose".

Later in the year, in November, she played the role of the Mona Lisa in the two-part episode "Mona Lisa's Revenge" in The Sarah Jane Adventures. In December, Jones starred in the Manchester Royal Exchange's production of Blithe Spirit, by Noël Coward, which ran until late January 2010. Jones was nominated for the Times Breakthrough Award at the 2010 South Bank Show Awards, the last ever ceremony, but lost to David Blandy. When discussing her nomination she said, "You do question 'What am I breaking through?' Am I breaking through the perception of people who just thought I was a screaming banshee in Coronation Street? Is it that I've worked hard and I've got better? Is it that now it's alright to say that I'm alright? I don't know what I was breaking through, but I knew that it was nice to feel included and patted on the back for a lot of hard work". Jones was described by Andrew Billen of The Times as being in a category of "those brave, talented few who earn their wings on a soap and then fly gloriously beyond it". In March 2010 Jones starred in Five Days, a non-connected sequel to the 2007 series of the same name, as the female lead DC Laurie Franklin. Later in the year, she starred as Sarah in Single Father on BBC1, a character who falls in love with a widower, Dave (David Tennant), who was married to her best friend before her death.

On 18 December 2010, a cover of Cyndi Lauper's "True Colors" featuring Jones, by the Manchester Show Choir, was released.

=== 2011–2016 ===
In May 2011, Jones played the character of Idris in the Doctor Who episode "The Doctor's Wife"; when the 'soul' of the Doctor's TARDIS is extracted from the ship, Idris becomes its new host, allowing the TARDIS to talk with the Doctor through Idris. Jones was cast due to writer Neil Gaiman wanting an actress, in the words of Jones, who is "odd; beautiful but strange-looking, and quite funny" to play the role of Idris. Dan Martin, the reviewer for The Guardian, noted that "Suranne Jones arguably sets the standard by which all guest stars must now be judged here [...] Jones was electrifying throughout". Also in May, Jones played DC Rachel Bailey in ITV's detective series, Scott & Bailey, opposite Lesley Sharp, who plays DC Janet Scott. The series is based upon an original idea by Jones and Sally Lindsay, her former Coronation Street co-star. After strong viewing figures and moderate critical success Scott & Bailey returned for a further four series between 2012 and 2016, with Jones serving as an executive producer on series five.

In July 2011, Jones starred as Marlene, a career woman living in Thatcher's Britain, in the Minerva Theatre's production of Top Girls by Caryl Churchill in Chichester. Michael Billington, reviewing it for The Guardian, remarked that "Suranne Jones captures excellently the hidden regrets of the go-getting Marlene". The production was later transferred to the West End's Trafalgar Studios. In August 2011, it was announced that Jones would star alongside John Hannah in a spoof detective drama written by Charlie Brooker and Daniel Maier called A Touch of Cloth. The programme aired in August 2012 on Sky1. Jones plays DC Anne Oldman, the "plucky, no-nonsense sidekick" of DCI Jack Cloth (Hannah). In March 2012, Jones began filming The Secret of Crickley Hall, a BBC1 dramatisation of the 2006 best-selling novel by James Herbert. She plays the lead role of Eve Caleigh, a woman who moves to Crickley Hall in an attempt to move on from the loss of her son, only to be haunted by supernatural occurrences. Jones described the series as a "classic haunted house spine-chiller with an emotional family story at its heart." Jones returned to the London stage in 2013 in a 20th-anniversary revival of Jonathan Harvey's play, Beautiful Thing. The play ran between 13 April and 25 May at the Arts Theatre, London, before a short national tour.

In April 2013, Jones starred as herself in Playhouse Presents: "Stage Door Johnnies", a comedy mockumentary about obsessive theatre fans airing on Sky Arts. Later that year, Jones played a young judge "battling to keep her head above water in the murky depths of the justice system" in Lawless, a television pilot, broadcast on Sky1 as part of its Drama Matters strand. In August 2013, it was announced that Jones was cast opposite Hermione Norris and Oona Chaplin in The Crimson Field, a BBC drama set in a field hospital in France during the First World War. The drama, which was broadcast in April 2014, marked Jones's first acting appearance in a period drama. In February 2014, Jones starred in Sarah Ruhl's stage adaptation of Virginia Woolf's Orlando at the Royal Exchange in Manchester. The play received generally positive reviews from critics, with Jones's performance being described as "superb" by Matt Trueman in The Guardian.

In September 2015, Jones starred as the title character in the BBC One thriller Doctor Foster, as a GP whose life begins to unravel when she suspects her husband of infidelity. The programme earned widespread critical acclaim, with Radio Times noting that "a career-best Suranne Jones was unstoppably brilliant"; the magazine placed Doctor Foster second in a roundup of the Top 40 best television shows of 2015. For her performance, Jones received the National Television Award for Best Drama Performance, the Broadcasting Press Guild Award for Best Actress, the Royal Television Society Award for Best Actor (female) and the British Academy Television Award for Best Actress at the respective 2016 ceremonies.

=== 2017–present ===
In September 2017, the second series of Doctor Foster premiered, garnering positive critical reception. Jones, originally hesitant to film another series, was persuaded after hearing writer Mike Bartlett's plans for the script. She also served as associate producer for the programme's second series, which was filmed in autumn 2016.

The same month, shooting began for an ensemble cast production of Vanity Fair, based on the 1848 novel of the same name. Airing the following September, Jones played the role of Miss Pinkerton, the haughty former headmistress of protagonist Becky Sharp (Olivia Cooke). In February 2018, Jones starred in the Sky Atlantic drama Save Me, playing the mother of a missing teen. Jones's performance received positive reviews, with Rebecca Nicholson of The Guardian writing: "you get the impression that Jones could act grief in her sleep, but she is impressively subtle here".

From February to May 2018, Jones returned to the West End in a revival of Bryony Lavery's stage play Frozen at the Theatre Royal Haymarket. Jones portrayed Nancy, the grieving mother of an abducted child opposite Jason Watkins. While the production received mixed reviews, Jones's performance was well received, described as "unflinchingly truthful and spontaneous" by The Independent. Jones missed the last four performances of the show's three-month run due to illness, citing the play's "deeply affecting" subject matter as a contributing factor.

Later in May, Jones began filming BBC and HBO co-production Gentleman Jack, written, produced and directed by Sally Wainwright. Jones signed on in July 2017 to play the lead role of Anne Lister, a lesbian Yorkshire industrialist in the 1830s. Described by The Independent as "a core member of Wainwright's unofficial repertory company", the series marks Jones's fourth collaboration with Wainwright. Premiering in April 2019 in the US and a month later in the UK, James Poniewozik of The New York Times wrote: "Jones's performance is a marvel, exuding vitality, charisma and sexual confidence. But she also brings Anne an empathy, humanity and glimpses of vulnerability that make her more than simply a flawless Regency-era Mary Sue." Jones's performance was also praised by Matthew Gilbert of The Boston Globe, who wrote: "Jones is a gale force wind on the show, driving it forward with her confidence and cool. She gives us a dynamic woman living out gender fluidity and attraction to women at a time of ignorance and intolerance. Her Anne rejects social convention—and has the money to do it—as she fervently and undauntedly pursues her desires. But then Jones adds in a hidden vulnerability that can be heartbreaking. It's the best, most faceted performance of the year, though few seem to know that." Gentleman Jack returned to BBC One for a second series on 10 April 2022.

In July 2019, Jones received the script for the second series of Save Me, titled Save Me Too, with a 14-week shoot commencing the following month. Save Me Too was released on 1 April 2020, and a third season was expected in 2022.

On 1 November 2019, a collaborative cover of "Symphony" by Jones and the Half Moon Theatre was released as part of the BBC Children in Need album Got It Covered. Jones also provided uncredited vocals on the album's cover track "It Must Be Love".

On 5 August 2021, Jones appeared in the title role of "I Am Victoria", the first in a second series of one-off dramas created by BAFTA winner Dominic Savage, focussing on various women's issues, in this case, mental health challenges.

Jones subsequently took the lead role of DCI Amy Silva in the six-episode BBC series Vigil, which aired weekly in the UK from 29 August 2021, and streamed all episodes on 23 December in the US. The submarine thriller with an underlying lesbian love story drew an initial audience of 13.4 million viewers, becoming the BBC's most successful drama in years.

In March 2022, the first project from TeamAkers, the production company formed by Jones and her husband Laurence Akers, was announced as Maryland, a three-part drama set on the Isle of Man.

It was announced in January 2025 that Jones and Jodie Whittaker would star in Frauds, a 6-part ITV heist series about two confidence women.

In August 2025, Jones starred as fictional UK prime minister Abigail Dalton in Netflix miniseries Hostage, for which she also served as executive producer.

In February 2026, it was announced that Jones will reprise her titular role in the third and final season of Doctor Foster, to take place 10 years after the last season (released in 2017). The forthcoming season will have five episodes and will begin filming in spring of 2026.

== Personal life ==
Jones lives in north London, with her husband, freelance scriptwriter and former magazine editor Laurence Akers. They met on 14 December 2013 at the wedding of Jones's friend actress Sally Lindsay to musician Steve White. The couple were married on 4 August 2015. They have one child.

== Activism ==
Jones has been involved with various charitable organisations. When she was a teenager, her mother, Jenny, was diagnosed with breast cancer, with Jones saying, "At the time we did a breast cancer campaign together. I still do a lot of charity runs." Jones has also worked with Christian Aid, travelling to Sierra Leone and the Democratic Republic of Congo to help with projects concerning HIV, women's rights and child soldiers.

== Acting credits ==
=== Film ===
Year	Title	Role	Notes	Ref.
2004	Punch	Judy	Short film	
2015	A Christmas Star	Miss Darcy		
2018	Gone	Karen	Short film	

=== Television ===
Key
†	Denotes series/miniseries that have not yet been released

Year	Title	Role	Notes
1997	Coronation Street	Mandy Phillips	1 episode
1998	City Central	Emma	Episode: "A Quiet Evening In"
1998	The Grand	Liz	1 episode
1999	My Wonderful Life	Linda	5 episodes
2000–2004	Coronation Street	Karen McDonald	Series regular, 494 episodes
2002–04	Bo' Selecta!	Herself	2 episodes
2005	Celebrate "Oliver!"	Nancy	Television film
2005–06	Vincent	Beth Goddard	Main cast
2006	Strictly Confidential	Linda Nelson	Main role
2007	Dead Clever: The Life and Crimes of Julie Bottomley	Julie Bottomley	Television film
2008	Harley Street	Martha Elliot	Main cast
2009	Unforgiven	Ruth Slater	Main role
2009	The Sarah Jane Adventures	Mona Lisa	2 episodes
2010	Five Days	DC Laurie Franklin	Main cast (series 2)
2010	Single Father	Sarah	Main cast
2011	Doctor Who	Idris	Episode: "The Doctor's Wife"
2011–16	Scott & Bailey	Sergeant Rachel Bailey	Series 1–5, 33 episodes (executive producer: series 5)
2012–14	A Touch of Cloth	DC Anne Oldman	Main cast
2012	The Secret of Crickley Hall	Eve Caleigh	Main role
2013	Playhouse Presents	Herself	Episode: "Stage Door Johnnies"
2013	Lawless	Lila Pettitt	Pilot
2014	The Crimson Field	Sister Joan Livesey	Main cast
2015–2017, TBA	Doctor Foster	Gemma Foster	Main role (associate producer: series 2)
2016	Brian Pern: 45 Years of Prog and Roll	Astrid Maddox Pern	1 episode
2018–20	Save Me	Claire McGory	Main cast
2018	Vanity Fair	Miss Pinkerton	2 episodes
2019–2022	Gentleman Jack	Anne Lister	Main role (executive producer: series 2)
2021	I Am Victoria	Victoria	Television film
2021	Celebrity Gogglebox for Su2c	Herself	Stand Up to Cancer special
2021–present	Vigil	DCI Amy Silva	Main role
2022	Christmas Carole	Carole Mackay	TV Movie; Executive producer
2023	Maryland	Becca	Main role and executive producer
2023	RuPaul's Drag Race UK	Herself; Guest judge	Series 5
2024	Suranne Jones: Investigating Witch Trials	Herself	Two-part documentary series
2025	Hostage	PM Abigail Dalton	Main role and executive producer
2025	Frauds	Bert	Main role and executive producer
2025	Film Club	Suz	Main cast

=== Stage ===
Year	Title	Role	Venue
2005	A Few Good Men	Joanne Galloway	Theatre Royal Haymarket
2006	Snow White and the Seven Dwarfs	Snow White	Manchester Opera House
2007	Terms of Endearment	Emma Greenway Horton	York Theatre Royal
2009	Blithe Spirit	Ruth Condomine	Manchester Royal Exchange
2011	Top Girls	Marlene	Minerva Theatre
2013	Beautiful Thing	Sandra	Arts Theatre
2014	Orlando	Orlando	Manchester Royal Exchange
2018	Frozen	Nancy	Theatre Royal Haymarket

== Awards and nominations ==
Year	Nominated work	Award	Result
2003	Coronation Street	National Television Award for Most Popular Actress	Nominated
2004	Coronation Street	British Soap Award for Best Actress	Won
2004	Coronation Street	National Television Award for Most Popular Actress	Won
2005	Coronation Street	British Soap Award for Best Actress	Won
2005	A Few Good Men	Theatregoers' Choice Award for Best Supporting Actress	Won
2009	Unforgiven	Royal Television Society Award for Best Actor – Female	Nominated
2009	Unforgiven	South Bank Show Award for The Times Breakthrough Award	Nominated
2010	Five Days	National Television Award for Outstanding Drama Performance	Nominated
2010	Five Days	TV Choice Award for Best Actress	Nominated
2011	Scott & Bailey	Royal Television Society Regional Award for Best Performance in a single Drama or Drama series	Won
2012	Scott & Bailey	National Television Award for Best Female Drama Performance	Nominated
2013	Scott & Bailey	National Television Award for Best Female Drama Performance	Nominated
2013	Beautiful Thing	WhatsOnStage Award for Best Actress in a Play	Nominated
2014	Scott & Bailey	National Television Award for Best TV Detective	Nominated
2014	Orlando	UK Theatre Award for Best Performance in a Play	Nominated
2015	Orlando	Manchester Theatre Awards	Nominated
2016	Doctor Foster	National Television Award for Best Drama Performance	Won
2016	Doctor Foster	Broadcasting Press Guild Award for Best Actress	Won
2016	Doctor Foster	Royal Television Society Award for Best Actor – Female	Won
2016	Doctor Foster	British Academy Television Award for Best Actress	Won
2016	Doctor Foster	TV Choice Award for Best Actress	Nominated
2017	Doctor Foster	TVTimes Award for Best Actress	Won
2018	Doctor Foster	National Television Award for Best Drama Performance	Won
2019	Gentleman Jack	TVTimes Award for Best Actress	Won
2020	Gentleman Jack	National Television Award for Best Drama Performance	Nominated
2020	Gentleman Jack	Broadcasting Press Guild Award for Best Actress	Nominated
2020	Gentleman Jack	Royal Television Society Award for Best Actor – Female	Nominated
2020	Gentleman Jack	British Academy Television Award for Best Actress	Nominated
