= Rachel Bailey =

- Scott & Bailey character
- Suranne Jones as Rachel Bailey
- First appearance: "Congratulations"
- Last appearance: 27 April 2016
- Created by: Sally Wainwright; Diane Taylor
- Portrayed by: Suranne Jones

In-universe information
- Nickname: Sherlock, Godzuki
- Title: DC; A/DS; DS; A/DI
- Occupation: Police officer

Acting Detective Inspector (A/DI) Rachel Bailey is a fictional character in the English television series Scott & Bailey. Portrayed by actress Suranne Jones, Bailey initially held the rank of Detective Constable, and prior to her appointment as A/DI, was later promoted to both A/DS and Detective Sergeant, respectively. Working in the Major Incident Team of the fictional Manchester Metropolitan Police, alongside her friends and colleagues Janet Scott (Lesley Sharp) and Gill Murray (Amelia Bullmore), Bailey sees her personal and professional life become dangerously intertwined.

== Storylines ==
=== Series 1 ===
Living in Chadderton, Greater Manchester, Rachel Bailey is a detective constable on Syndicate 9, the Major Incident Team for Manchester Metropolitan Police. Upon the beginning of the first series, her lawyer boyfriend, Nicholas Savage (Rupert Graves), is revealed to be a philanderer, married with two sons in Wilmslow. Rachel, jeopardising her career, uses the Police National Computer (PNC) to locate the address his vehicle is registered to. Meanwhile, she discovers that she is pregnant with his child. Discovering his whereabouts, she reveals to Nick her plans to terminate her pregnancy and proceeds to blackmail him into allowing her to stay in his city centre apartment for free. Her personal and professional life becomes entangled when Savage is the defence barrister for Georgios Stelikos, a man on trial for murder and rape, at which Rachel has to give evidence. Savage uses information Rachel told him to his advantage, to which she denies. She later confides to Janet she perjured herself in court and that she had discussed details of the case to Nick. The jury finds Stelikos innocent, though the evidence points to the opposite. Savage, also upon seeing Rachel, realises that she has not gone through with the abortion, however, she later suffers a miscarriage. Nick's wife discovers his affair and telephones DCI Gill Murray (Amelia Bullmore), Rachel's boss. Murray quizzes Rachel regarding her relationship and whether it caused the collapse of the Stelikos case. She, taking Janet's advice, flatly denies the accusation. As Nick's wife knows of the affair, he evicts her from his apartment, as she has nothing to use against him. As there is no room at her sister Alison's (Sally Lindsay) home, stays with Janet until she can return to her old property.

Rachel discovers that Savage has had an affair with a juror in the middle of a trial of a gang member whom Nick was defending. She confronts him about it; realising that the revelation could destroy his career, he arranges for her to be killed. A man attempts to run down Rachel in a car, but misses and crashes. She attempts to apprehend the man, but he runs out into traffic and is struck and later dies. However, she discovers there is a link between the incident and her knowledge over Nick's affair. Murray arrests Savage, but in doing so learns that Rachel has used the PNC on Savage's vehicle months ago, an abuse of her powers. Murray informs her that her career is over, but Janet intervenes, informing Gill that she was with Rachel at the time and did not report the incident and as such, leaves her with the ultimatum that both of them should be fired, straining Gill and Janet's strong friendship. Gill, under much pressure, agrees to allow the misdemeanor to slip by unnoticed on the condition that neither of them ever fails her again.

=== Series 2 ===
As the second series begins, Rachel's estranged brother Dominic turns up at her door. With past criminal convictions, she is eager for her colleagues not to discover his past; however, she helps him, allowing for him to stay. She also begins a romance with PC Sean McCartney (Sean Maguire). Gill reveals to Rachel that police are not pressing charges against Savage, much to Rachel's anger; she drunkenly confides to her brother about Nick Savage. Her relationship with Dominic becomes strained when he causes a small kitchen fire, though she forgives him. She later discovers him having intercourse with another man who has paid him. She advises that he have an HIV test after realising the extent of his frivolous behaviour. Meanwhile, Rachel and DC Kevin Lumb (Ben Batt) are both due to sit their sergeant's exam; however, she misses her exam following the news that Dominic has been hospitalised. She discovers that his test results proved negative and, in celebration, he took Rachel's sports car and crashed it, though he was not seriously injured. Alison rebukes Dominic for his behaviour. Rachel discovers that Nicholas Savage has been seriously assaulted in the car park of his city residence and, wildly drunk the night before at a party in the city centre, she cannot remember her whereabouts but has a painful bruise on her forehead. She is taken into questioning regarding the assault, but Savage dies in hospital from the injuries sustained and the assault case becomes a murder investigation. Rachel discovers Dominic had killed Nick, seeing Rachel's pain when Savage was not prosecuted. He discovered how to access the private car park as the man Rachel had caught him sleeping with lived in the same apartment block. Rachel locates Dominic and tries to arrest him, but finds herself unable to, instead letting him run away.

=== Series 3 ===
Rachel is investigated for her complicity in her brother's escape, and later for inciting the murder of Nick Savage. After Dom makes an official statement against his sister, she is arrested for murder. Rachel has a one-night stand with DC Kevin Lumb, putting a strain on her relationship with Janet because they come to Rachel's room at Janet's, upsetting Janet's daughter, who idolizes Rachel. (Rachel is staying with Janet to avoid being with her recently married husband, having discovered that she has no commitment to the marriage and can't stand to be tied down to it.) Though they continue to work together, Janet informs Rob that she no longer likes Rachel.

=== Series 4 ===
In series four, both Janet and Rachel pass their Sergeants boards, and after Janet declines a promotion, Gill appoints Rachel Acting Sergeant of Syndicate 9. In this capacity, Rachel goes head-to-head with Rob as one of his father's old cases is reopened. Following the departure of DS Rob Waddington, Rachel takes on the role of Sergeant, though a drunk Gill later informs Rachel she was second choice for the job, causing strain between her and Janet. Also, Rachel begins a relationship with DSI Will Pemberton, who recommends her for a Vice initiative, though this relationship later ends abruptly. Rachel oversees her first murder investigation, while she and Janet attempt to get Gill through to her retirement with her reputation intact, as Dodson learns she is an alcoholic.

=== Series 5 ===
In series five, after a secondment to the Metropolitan Police Vice Division, Rachel returns to Syndicate 9 as an Acting Detective Inspector, replacing Gill Murray as the Senior Investigating Officer.

== Personality ==
"Rachel is flawed, she's maverick - she was meant to be what we usually perceive as a male voice character"

— Actress Suranne Jones, who plays Rachel

Suranne Jones, who plays Rachel Bailey, originally conceived the idea of the programme alongside Sally Lindsay, before it came to fruition under the helm of Sally Wainwright and Diane Taylor. Jones and Lindsay felt that there was a lack of roles in television that were not "wife-of, sidekick-to, mother-of, mistress-to". Described as " An ambitious young detective with a complicated personal life", the character of Rachel developed as a strong-willed, initiative and able detective. However, she possesses flaws, which manifest themselves in Bailey's personal life, such as her tempestuous relationship with Nick Savage. Rachel Bailey, who is portrayed as a single woman in her early thirties, contrasts the character of Janet, who is in a failing marriage and has two daughters. Janet, in her forties, is also wiser than Rachel; Janet is astounded that Rachel has discussed the details of a case with Nick Savage, highlighting Rachel's imprudence regarding her personal life and its effects on her professional life. As one reviewer opined, the character "seemed to lurch from one crisis to another, putting her career – and eventually her life – in danger".
