= Watching (TV series) =

British TV sitcom (1987–1993)

- Genre: Sitcom
- Created by: Jim Hitchmough
- Starring: Paul Bown; Emma Wray; Liza Tarbuck; Patsy Byrne; Perry Fenwick
- Country of origin: United Kingdom
- Original language: English
- No. of series: 7
- No. of episodes: 56

Production
- Producer: Granada Television
- Running time: 30mins x 54; 60mins x 2

Original release
- Network: ITV
- Release: 5 July 1987 – 4 April 1993

Watching is a British television sitcom, produced by Granada Television for the ITV network and broadcast for seven series and four Christmas specials between 1987 and 1993.

The series was written by Jim Hitchmough and starred Paul Bown and Emma Wray as mismatched couple Malcolm Stoneway and Brenda Wilson.

== Plot ==
Watching was set in Merseyside, with Brenda from Liverpool and Malcolm from Meols on the Wirral, the "posh" part of Merseyside on the other side of the River Mersey. The title refers to Brenda and her sister Pamela's hobby of "people-watching", and to Malcolm's hobby of birdwatching, which initially Brenda endures rather than enjoys, but later comes to appreciate. Following the idea, the episode titles are verbs in the ‘-ing’ form.

Quiet biker Malcolm, who lived with his domineering mother (played by Patsy Byrne), was accompanied on his birdwatching trips by loud scouser Brenda, who was forced to ride in the sidecar of his Norton motorbike and had a habit of rubbing his mother up the wrong way. Other key characters in the series were Brenda's sister Pamela (Liza Tarbuck), her boyfriend (later husband) David (John Bowler – Series 2 onwards) and Brenda and Pam's mother Joyce (played by Noreen Kershaw) in the last few series. The series followed Malcolm and Brenda's on/off relationship, during which Malcolm married another woman called Lucinda (played by Elizabeth Morton). However, Brenda and Malcolm finally married each other in the final episode, "Knotting", which was broadcast on 4 April 1993.

The series ran for 54 half-hour episodes over seven series, plus two hour-long special extended episodes.

Watching was later repeated on Granada Plus during the early 2000s and on BFBS' Forces TV from March 2022 until the channel ceased broadcasting four months later. It was also broadcast in Australia in the early 90s on the ABC and in New Zealand on TV One.

== Series overview ==
Series	Episodes	Originally released	
Series	Episodes	First released	Last released
1	7	5 July 1987	16 August 1987
Special	1	27 December 1987	
2	7	19 February 1988	1 April 1988
Special	1	24 December 1988	
3	6	3 March 1989	7 April 1989
4	9	1 December 1989	2 February 1990
5	10	14 December 1990	22 February 1991
Special	1	25 December 1991	
6	6	3 January 1992	7 February 1992
Special	1	1 January 1993	
7	7	21 February 1993	4 April 1993

== Episodes ==
=== Series 1 (1987) ===
No. overall	No. in series	Title	Original release date
1	1	"Meeting"	5 July 1987
Pamela and Brenda are sisters who spend time "people watching", whilst at their local the Grapes they spot Malcolm. Brenda agrees to spend the day with him.
2	2	"Wrestling"	12 July 1987
Malcolm tells his colleague Terry about his day out with Brenda and it isn't long before Brenda persuades Malcolm to take her out for dinner.
3	3	"Outing"	19 July 1987
Brenda tries to make another date with Malcolm, but Malcolm's mother has also made plans to spend the day with him.
4	4	"Confusing"	26 July 1987
Terry offers his assistance to Malcolm, so arranges to meet Brenda in The Grapes.
5	5	"Leaving"	2 August 1987
Pamela and Brenda are not on good terms. Pamela has ordered Brenda out. In an attempt to reform her character, she agrees to accompany Malcolm on his day off at the motor museum.
6	6	"Repenting"	9 August 1987
With a head full of compassion, Brenda has ideas about making Pamela feel more appreciated by her lover Sidney Clough.
7	7	"Hiding"	16 August 1987
Malcolm injures his back whilst birdwatching.

=== Christmas Special (1987) ===
No. overall	Title	Original release date
8	"Seasoning"	27 December 1987
Brenda, Pamela and Malcolm set out to buy a Christmas Tree. With Mrs Stoneway insisting Malcolm spend Christmas Day at home, Brenda decides on a pretend Christmas Day at the flat.

=== Series 2 (1988) ===
No. overall	No. in series	Title	Original release date
9	1	"Falling"	19 February 1988
Brenda impresses Malcolm with her knowledge of birds. Pamela wants to change jobs, whilst Malcolm's in danger of losing his.
10	2	"Dancing"	26 February 1988
Depressed about her work, her love prospects and her appearance, Pamela needs cheering up.
11	3	"Visiting"	4 March 1988
Brenda isn't convinced about Malcolm's attempts to cancel their birdwatching trip.
12	4	"Visiting II"	11 March 1988
Malcolm is tired of his mother's attitude and decides to leave home.
13	5	"Missing"	18 March 1988
Malcolm & Brenda have been separated some time and they're getting on everyone's nerves.
14	6	"Dining"	25 March 1988
Malcolm is planning a special evening - he needs a swish venue for dinner and seeks advice.
15	7	"Moving"	1 April 1988
Brenda sees Malcolm lunching with Susan and suspects he's two-timing her.

=== Christmas Special (1988) ===
No. overall	Title	Original release date
16	"Twitching"	24 December 1988
Malcolm and Brenda go camping for the weekend to escape the pressures of home.

=== Series 3 (1989) ===
No. overall	No. in series	Title	Original release date
17	1	"Losing"	3 March 1989
Brenda has lost her job and her home, and back in Liverpool she finds she's been demoted to the settee as Pamela has refurbished the flat.
18	2	"Deceiving"	10 March 1989
Brenda and Malcolm spot Pamela's boyfriend David having a celebratory lunch with another woman.
19	3	"Requiting"	17 March 1989
Terry, Susan, Malcolm and Brenda attend Mod Shop's annual dinner dance, but during the MD's speech Brenda can contain herself no longer, leaving Malcolm to resign on the spot.
20	4	"Breeding"	24 March 1989
Malcolm has started a motorcycle repair business in his mother's garage, but has yet to see a customer. Meanwhile, Brenda, Malcolm, Pamela and David enjoy a day at Martin Mere, where Pamela reveals she's pregnant.
21	5	"Wrenching"	31 March 1989
Malcolm's business has taken off and there's a constant stream of motorbikes at the Stoneway household but not everyone's happy.
22	6	"Wedding"	7 April 1989
David and Pamela are married with Malcolm as best man, and a surprise wedding gift from Brenda.

=== Series 4 (1989–90) ===
No. overall	No. in series	Title	Original release date
23	1	"Joking"	1 December 1989
Malcolm's business is booming and he decides to take on an assistant, meanwhile Brenda is back living at her mother's and Pamela is enjoying her new home and motherhood.
24	2	"Pairing"	8 December 1989
When Chris collides with the Lynch pram, Brenda is forced to return home on the bus leaving Malcolm with the pram, and Chris with the shopping.
25	3	"Faultering"	15 December 1989
Brenda's presence is starting to get on David's nerves.
26	4	"Exploding"	22 December 1989
Pamela suggests Brenda come clean about her night out with Chris; Brenda agrees but is surprised by Malcolm's reaction.
27	5	"Repairing"	5 January 1990
Brenda has moved in with Malcolm and his mother, but Malcolm still has his doubts her fling with Chris and sets his sights on getting rid of his Romeo employee.
28	6	"Petting"	12 January 1990
Malcolm and Brenda bring home an injured pigeon. They also accommodate the Lynch pet tortoise whilst Pamela and David enjoy a second honeymoon.
29	7	"Floating"	19 January 1990
Brenda suggests they take a friend's boat for their latest birdwatching excursion, but will it be plain sailing?
30	8	"Proposing"	26 January 1990
Brenda refuses Malcolm's offer of marriage and Aunt Peggy comes to stay at the Stoneways.
31	9	"Flitting"	2 February 1990
Aunt Peggy suggests Malcolm and Brenda house-sit whilst she stays with her sister.

=== Series 5 (1990–91) ===
No. overall	No. in series	Title	Original release date
32	1	"Listing"	14 December 1990
Pamela and David are enjoying married life, and Pamela announces she is pregnant.
33	2	"Nesting"	21 December 1990
Brenda and Malcolm are invited to Pamela's birthday party, although one birthday present causes problems for Pamela.
34	3	"Feeding"	4 January 1991
Mrs Stoneway is concerned Malcolm isn't being looked after and both Pamela and Aunt Peggy give Brenda advice on looking after her man.
35	4	"Wining"	11 January 1991
Brenda finds a kindred spirit in Uncle Bernard - they agree not to tell Peggy of his return to Aigburth.
36	5	"Fixing"	18 January 1991
Lucinda leaves her car for repairs at Malcolm's garage, Brenda starts a new job and Mrs Stoneway is suspicious that Brenda is having other men stay at Aigburth.
37	6	"Straying"	25 January 1991
Brenda returns to the house at Aigburth and finds both families there, having had enough she returns home to mum.
38	7	"Homing"	1 February 1991
Gerald and Brenda manage to bring about reconciliation between David and Pamela but reuniting Malcolm and Brenda proves more of a challenge.
39	8	"Suiting"	8 February 1991
Pamela and David engineer a chance meeting between Malcolm and Brenda, and Malcolm has a special favour to ask of David.
40	9	"Bonding"	15 February 1991
David tries to calm Malcolm's wedding day nerves but will Brenda make it to the church in time?
41	10	"Presenting"	22 February 1991
It's Christmas time and Brenda and Malcolm both plan to avoid the festivities in the same way.

=== Christmas Special (1991) ===
No. overall	Title	Original release date
42	"Slipping"	25 December 1991
Malcolm partners Brenda on a birdwatching weekend in Anglesey but, when they choose a cave as their hide, they find that time and tide wait for no man.

=== Series 6 (1992) ===
No. overall	No. in series	Title	Original release date
43	1	"Using"	3 January 1992
Pamela and David have moved house and Malcolm is called in as plumbing advisor.
44	2	"Echoing"	10 January 1992
Malcolm persuades Lucinda to join him birdwatching, but they accidentally meet up with Brenda and Jonathan.
45	3	"Doctoring"	17 January 1992
Pamela and David provide the venue for a Medics Party and Malcolm's fears are confirmed when they start talking shop.
46	4	"Christening"	24 January 1992
Pamela decides Malcolm and Lucinda will make ideal godparents for Zelda, and Brenda is asked to be third.
47	5	"Gulling"	31 January 1992
Brenda refuses to see Malcolm until he tells Lucinda their marriage is over. But before he has a chance Lucinda has some surprising news.
48	6	"Confessing"	7 February 1992
Brenda is devastated by Malcolm's news and doesn't take kindly to his explanation.

=== New Year Special (1993) ===
No. overall	Title	Original release date
49	"Reverting"	1 January 1993
Malcolm and Brenda try to surprise friends and family with the news they are back together.

=== Series 7 (1993) ===
No. overall	No. in series	Title	Original release date
50	1	"Migrating"	21 February 1993
Pamela accuses David of never being at home; he concedes and returns home with a sailing boat.
51	2	"Uncoupling"	28 February 1993
Malcolm's efficiency causes chaos in the Wilson household, but Mrs Wilson's attempt to offload some of her residents backfires.
52	3	"Helping"	7 March 1993
Brenda complains she doesn't see enough of Malcolm but when he arranges that they meet for lunch, Mrs Stoneway throws a spanner in the works.
53	4	"Engaging"	14 March 1993
Brenda is still disappointed by her relationship with Malcolm. Pamela advises they consider marriage.
54	5	"Wandering One"	21 March 1993
Pamela and Brenda are on holiday together, whilst they're away Mrs. Wilson, Gerald and Malcolm move in with David.
55	6	"Wandering Too"	28 March 1993
Pamela and Brenda continue their holiday, whilst life goes on at home.
56	7	"Knotting"	4 April 1993
Despite some pre-wedding hitches it looks as if Brenda and Malcolm's wedding will go ahead on schedule.

== Cast ==
- Emma Wray as Brenda Wilson
- Paul Bown as Malcolm Stoneway
- Liza Tarbuck as Pamela Wilson/Lynch
- Patsy Byrne as Mrs. Marjorie Stoneway
- Perry Fenwick as Terry Milton (series 1–3, 7)
- Philip Fox as Sidney Clough (series 1)
- John Bowler as David Lynch (series 2 onwards)
- Elizabeth Spriggs as Aunt Peggy (series 2, 4–5)
- Liz Crowther as Susan Roberts (series 2–3)
- Ann Rye as Mrs. Riley (series 3–5)
- Russell Boulter as Chris Cameron (series 4)
- Ken Jones as Uncle Bernard (series 5)
- Noreen Kershaw as Joyce Wilson (series 5 onwards)
- Andrew Hilton as Gerald Wilson (series 5 onwards)
- Elizabeth Morton as Lucinda Davis/Stoneway (series 5–7)
- Richard Good as Jonathan MacMillan (series 6)
- Ally Vuli as Roz (series 7)
- Jonathan Hackett as Julian (series 7)
- Al T. Kossy as Harold
- Dave Dutton as Oswald Parkins (series 1–5)
- Bill Moores as "Cedric", regular at the Grapes
- Anita Petrof as "Mary", regular at the Grapes

Note: "Cedric" and "Mary" are the names given to the characters by Brenda during her people-watching days, Cedric's "real" name is unknown, but in series one episode "Repenting" Brenda reveals that she has talked to her and that "Mary"'s real name is Freda.

== Production ==
Watching was originally conceived as a comedy sketch about a shy birdwatcher and a lively girl, written by Hitchmough during a drama workshop at the Everyman Theatre in Liverpool. He submitted the sketch for the BBC satirical series Not the Nine O'Clock News but it was rejected.

Undeterred by this, Hitchmough developed the sketch into a stage play, adapted into an afternoon play for BBC Radio 4.

Later, Watching won a commission from Granada Television to produce a seven-part series for broadcast on Sunday nights at 10pm, which was a timeslot that was usually reserved for satirical comedy such as Yorkshire Television's The New Statesman and Central's Spitting Image.

After a successful first series and subsequent Christmas special, Watching was recommissioned and moved to an earlier timeslot of 8pm on Friday nights. Up until the end of the final run (broadcast at 7pm on Sunday), the series would have audiences of over 13 million viewers.

Originally, the series was produced by David Liddiment (later to become Director of Programming at ITV) and directed by Les Chatfield, a senior director at Granada. Chatfield directed most of the episodes and took over producing duties from series 3 onwards. Liddiment became the series' executive producer.

Emma Wray sang both the opening and closing versions of the theme song, What Does He See in Me?, which was written by Charles Hart. Incidental music was written and composed by Richie Close.

== Books ==
A novel based on the first series of Watching and written by Jim Hitchmough was published in 1990 by Bantam Books.

== Home releases ==
A video featuring the first two episodes, "Meeting" and "Wrestling", was released by CastleVision in August 1993.

All seven series and four specials have been released on DVD. The complete first series, including the 1987 Christmas special ("Seasoning"), was released on DVD in February 2006; also released was Watching: Series 1 -Selected Episodes, which comprised three first-season episodes: "Meeting", "Outing" and "Hiding". The complete second series was released in March 2008. The complete third, fourth, fifth, sixth and seventh series including the 1988, 1991 and 1993 Christmas and New Year specials ("Twitching", "Slipping" and "Reverting"), especially a nine-disc set of the complete series, were released in April, May, July, October and November 2009. All releases on DVD by Network.

DVD	Year(s)	Release date
The Complete Series 1	1987	27 February 2006
The Complete Series 2	1988	17 March 2008
The Complete Series 3	1989	6 April 2009
The Complete Series 4	1989- 1990	25 May 2009
The Complete Series 5	1990- 1991	13 July 2009
The Complete Series 6	1992	5 October 2009
The Complete Series 7	1993	9 November 2009
The Complete Series 1 to 7 Box Set	1987- 1993	9 November 2009
