= Frauds (TV series) =

British Television series

- Genre: Crime thriller
- Created by: Suranne Jones; Anne-Marie O'Connor
- Written by: Anne-Marie O'Connor
- Directed by: Giulia Gandini
- Starring: Suranne Jones; Jodie Whittaker
- Composer: Alex Baranowski
- Country of origin: United Kingdom
- Original language: English
- No. of episodes: 6

Production
- Executive producers: Anne-Marie O’Connor; Suranne Jones; Debra Hayward; Alison Carpenter; Jill Forbes
- Producer: Pat Tookey-Dickson
- Production company: Monumental Television

Original release
- Network: ITVX
- Release: 5 October – 20 October 2025

Frauds is a British crime thriller television miniseries for ITV starring Suranne Jones and Jodie Whittaker.

== Premise ==
Having spent ten years in prison, Bert reunites with former partner Sam with the idea for a new heist.

== Cast ==
- Suranne Jones as Roberta "Bert" Mancini
- Jodie Whittaker as Martha "Sam" Samuels
- Horacio Colomé as Miguel
- Talisa Garcia as Miss Take
- Abdul Salis as Mateo
- Karan Gill as Bilal
- Elizabeth Berrington as Jackie Diamond
- Lee Boardman as The Great Diavolo
- Karise Yansen as Komet
- Christian Cooke as Deegs
- Thais Martin as Caitlin
- Kate Fleetwood as Celine
- Javier Taboada as Blas
- Nansi Nsue as Amaya
- Victor Solé as Carlos Pérez
- Aïda Ballmann as Doctor

== Production ==
The series was created by Anne-Marie O'Connor and Suranne Jones, with O'Connor writing the script. O'Connor and Jones are executive producers alongside Alison Owen and Katie Kelly for Monumental Television, part of ITV Studios. Debra Hayward, Alison Carpenter, and Jill Forbes also executive produce. It is a co-production with TeamAkers. Pat Tookey-Dickson is series producer, with Giulia Gandini leading director on the series.

Suranne Jones leads the cast alongside Jodie Whittaker. The cast was expanded in 2025 to include Talisa Garcia, Karan Gil, Elizabeth Berrington, Lee Boardman, and Christian Cooke, amongst others. Filming began in Spain in January 2025.

The series was primarily filmed in Tenerife in the Canary Islands.

== Broadcast ==
The first episode of the series was broadcast on 5 October 2025.

== Reception ==
The London Evening Standard gave the series 4 out 5 stars, praising the pace, writing, and performances.

Writing in The Guardian, Lucy Mangan gives the series 5 out of 5 stars, describing the series as "a fantastically stylish, emotionally rich and profoundly intelligent piece of entertainment that is feminist to its bones without preaching and in every way a triumph".

Craig Mathieson, writing in The Sydney Morning Herald gave the series 4 stars out of 5. He praises its depth, saying that it is more than a conventional heist movie: "the threads that are being woven into something new here have a broader provenance. Think David Mamet’s House of Games, not just the Ocean’s movies... There’s a psychological layer also at work, rife with abandonment issues and latent anger".
