= Dave Dutton =

English actor

- Born: 19 August 1947 (age 79); Atherton, Lancashire, England

Dave Dutton (born 1947 in Atherton, Lancashire) is an English actor. He first came to public recognition when he played the part of Oswald, the eccentric cafe owner in Granada television's situation comedy, Watching. He has played roles in many different television series including Heartbeat and The Royal. He has also played eleven different parts in the soap opera, Coronation Street as well as five in Emmerdale.

He co-starred with Rik Mayall in the six-part audio series The Last Hurrah playing failed ventriloquist Bonjour Hellfire.

He is a former newspaper reporter, television scriptwriter, songwriter, author of 14 books and ex-front man for comedy folk group Inclognito with Bramwell Taylor and Eric White.
