= Preston School =

Preston School Academy

Location
- Monks Dale; Yeovil, Somerset, BA21 3JD; England; 50°56′44″N 2°39′23″W

Information
- Type: Academy; Business and Enterprise College
- Motto: Bringing learning to life and life to learning.
- Established: 1961, but became an academy in July 1st, 2011.
- Trust: Midsomer Norton Schools Partnership
- Specialist: Business and Enterprise
- Department for Education URN: 136894 Tables
- Ofsted: Reports
- Headteacher: Matthew Doble
- Deputy Head: Peter Dickens
- Staff: 91
- Teaching staff: 41
- Employees: 50
- Years offered: 7, 8, 9, 10, 11
- Gender: Mixed
- Age: 11 to 16
- Enrolment: 1033 (2026)
- Average class size: 30
- Language: English, French, Spanish, Italian
- Houses: Dunster, Stourhead, Montacute, Barrington
- Colors: Red and Blue
- Sports: Yes
- Team name: Preston School Prancers
- Test average: 8
- Publication: Newsletter
- Newspaper: The Preston Press
- Website: https://prestonschool.co.uk/

Preston School is a secondary school with specialist Business and Enterprise College status in Yeovil, Somerset, England. As of 2025, enrolment was estimated to be 975 students aged 11 to 16 years. In July 2011, the school became an academy. As of 2026, the headteacher is Matthew Doble and the deputy headteacher is Peter Dickens

== History ==
Preston School opened in 1961. The school was awarded specialist school status as a Business and Enterprise college in September 2002. In February 2021, the school joined the Midsomer Norton Schools Partnership Multi-Academy Trust.

== Performance ==
As of 2023, the school's Ofsted inspection ranked it "Good".

== Notable alumni ==
- Sarah Parish, actress
