= Heathrow: Britain's Busiest Airport =

British reality TV series

- Genre: Documentary
- Directed by: Juliette Murray-Topham; Ben Phethean; Jimmy Dallas; Jermaine Blake; Marc Knighton; Emma Findlay; David Waterman; Charles Crich; Dave Walley; Patrick Phillips; Miles Blayden-Ryall; Therese Byrne
- Narrated by: Paul Thornley (2015–2017); Patricia Hodge (2018); Julie Walters (2019, 2021); Joanna Lumley (2020); Sarah Parish (2022); Frances Barber (2022)
- Country of origin: United Kingdom
- Original language: English
- No. of series: 8
- No. of episodes: 53

Production
- Executive producers: Juliette Murray-Topham; Tom Barry; Eve Kay
- Producers: Juliette Murray-Topham; Jimmy Dallas; Therese Byrne; Ben Phethean; Charles Crich; Jermaine Blake; Nick Cohen; Dave Pearson; Marc Knighton; Emma Findlay; Dave Walley; Tom Pearson; Samantha Deville; Patrick Phillips
- Production location: Heathrow Airport
- Editors: Dave Pearson; Nick Cohen; Badger Cooper; Hamit Shonpal; Jonny Stacey; Bjorn Johnson; Dave Berezai; Jeremy Brettingham; Jonnie Case
- Running time: 60 minutes (Series 1–3, 8); 30 minutes (Series 4–7)
- Production company: Raw TV

Original release
- Network: ITV
- Release: 4 June 2015 – 24 August 2022

Heathrow: Britain's Busiest Airport is a British documentary series, aired by ITV from June 2015 until August 2022.

In July 2023, it was confirmed by ITV that the show would not be returning for a ninth series.

== Format ==
The series follows the events happening day after day at Heathrow Airport in London.

== Episodes ==
=== Series overview ===
Series	Episodes	Originally released	
Series	Episodes	First released	Last released
1	3	3 October 2015	17 October 2015
2	3	30 May 2016	13 June 2016
3	3	10 May 2017	24 May 2017
4	6	2 May 2018	13 June 2018
5	12	21 May 2019	16 October 2019
6	12	19 August 2020	4 November 2020
7	12	10 March 2021	27 October 2021
8	6	20 July 2022	24 August 2022

=== Series 1 (2015) ===
Episode no.	Airdate	Viewers (millions)	ITV weekly rating	Narrator
1 ("Arrivals")	3 October 2015	TBA	TBC	Paul Thornley
2 ("Turnaround")	10 October 2015	TBA	TBC	Paul Thornley
3 ("Departures")	17 October 2015	TBA	TBC	Paul Thornley
SA	2015	—N/a	—N/a	Paul Thornley

=== Series 2 (2016) ===
Official episode viewing figures are from BARB.

Episode no.	Airdate	Viewers (millions)	ITV weekly rating	Narrator
1	30 May 2016	3.33	13	Paul Thornley
2	6 June 2016	3.34	14	Paul Thornley
3	13 June 2016	2.89	15	Paul Thornley
SA	2016	3.18	—N/a	Paul Thornley

=== Series 3 (2017) ===
Official episode viewing figures are from BARB.

Episode no.	Airdate	Viewers (millions)	ITV weekly rating	Narrator
1	10 May 2017	4.48	16	Paul Thornley
2	17 May 2017	3.46	17	Paul Thornley
3	24 May 2017	3.25	17	Paul Thornley
SA	2017	3.73	—N/a	Paul Thornley

=== Series 4 (2018) ===
From series 4, episodes were cut down from 60 to 30 minutes to fit a new time slot.

Episode no.	Airdate	Viewers (millions)	ITV weekly rating	Narrator
1	2 May 2018	3.6	18	Patricia Hodge
2	9 May 2018	3.4	21	Patricia Hodge
3	16 May 2018	4.1	23	Patricia Hodge
4	23 May 2018	4.4		Patricia Hodge
5	6 June 2018	4.5	126	Patricia Hodge
6	13 June 2018	4.3		Patricia Hodge
SA	2018	4.0	—N/a	Patricia Hodge

=== Series 5 (2019) ===
Episode no.	Airdate	Viewers (millions)	ITV weekly rating	Narrator
1	21 May 2019	NA	NA	Julie Walters
2	22 May 2019	NA	NA	Julie Walters
3	5 June 2019	NA	NA	Julie Walters
4	12 June 2019	4.02	14	Julie Walters
5	19 June 2019	4.07	15	Julie Walters
6	26 June 2019	3.90	13	Julie Walters
7	11 September 2019	NA	NA	Julie Walters
8	18 September 2019	NA	NA	Julie Walters
9	25 September 2019	TBA	TBA	Julie Walters
10	2 October 2019	TBA	TBA	Julie Walters
11	9 October 2019	TBA	TBA	Julie Walters
12	16 October 2019	TBA	TBA	Julie Walters
SA	2019	TBA	TBA	Julie Walters

=== Series 6 (2020) ===
Series 6 was filmed before COVID-19 restrictions.

Episode no.	Airdate	Viewers (millions)	ITV weekly rating	Narrator
1	19 August 2020	TBA	TBA	Joanna Lumley
2	26 August 2020	TBA	TBA	Joanna Lumley
3	2 September 2020	TBA	TBA	Joanna Lumley
4	9 September 2020	TBA	TBA	Joanna Lumley
5	16 September 2020	TBA	TBA	Joanna Lumley
6	23 September 2020	TBA	TBA	Joanna Lumley
7	30 September 2020	TBA	TBA	Joanna Lumley
8	7 October 2020	TBA	TBA	Joanna Lumley
9	14 October 2020	TBA	TBA	Joanna Lumley
10	21 October 2020	TBA	TBA	Joanna Lumley
11	28 October 2020	TBA	TBA	Joanna Lumley
12	4 November 2020	TBA	TBA	Joanna Lumley
SA	2020	TBA	TBA	Joanna Lumley

=== Series 7 (2021) ===
The first 3 episodes of this series were filmed in late 2020 during the COVID-19 pandemic and through England's second national lockdown. Episodes 4 and above were recorded during the relaxation of certain UK travel restrictions in mid 2021.

Episode no.	Airdate	Viewers (millions)	ITV weekly rating	Narrator
1	10 March 2021	TBA	TBA	Julie Walters
2	17 March 2021	TBA	TBA	Julie Walters
3	24 March 2021	TBA	TBA	Julie Walters
4	25 August 2021	TBA	TBA	Julie Walters
5	1 September 2021	TBA	TBA	Julie Walters
6	15 September 2021	TBA	TBA	Julie Walters
7	22 September 2021	TBA	TBA	Julie Walters
8	29 September 2021	TBA	TBA	Julie Walters
9	6 October 2021	TBA	TBA	Julie Walters
10	13 October 2021	TBA	TBA	Julie Walters
11	20 October 2021	TBA	TBA	Julie Walters
12	27 October 2021	TBA	TBA	Julie Walters

=== Series 8 (2022) ===
Series 8 premiered on 20 July 2022.

Episode no.	Airdate	Viewers (millions)	ITV weekly rating	Narrator
1	20 July 2022	TBA	TBA	Sarah Parish
2	27 July 2022	TBA	TBA	Sarah Parish
3	3 August 2022	TBA	TBA	Sarah Parish
4	10 August 2022	TBA	TBA	Sarah Parish
5	17 August 2022	TBA	TBA	Sarah Parish
6	24 August 2022	TBA	TBA	Frances Barber
