= Sarah Parish =

English actress (born 1968)

Sarah Parish MBE
- Born: 7 June 1968 (age 58); Yeovil, Somerset, England
- Occupation: Actress
- Years active: 1993–present
- Spouse: James Murray (m. 2007)
- Children: 2

Sarah Parish (born 7 June 1968) is an English actress. She is known for her work on television series including The Pillars of the Earth, Peak Practice, Hearts and Bones, Cutting It, Doctor Who, Mistresses, Merlin, Atlantis, Monroe, HBO's Industry, Stay Close, Trollied, W1A and, as the titular character, Bancroft.

With her husband, James Murray, she set up the Murray Parish Trust, which raises money for paediatric facilities, and for which they were both appointed MBEs in the 2025 New Year Honours.

== Early life ==
Parish was born in Yeovil, Somerset, to Bill and Thelma Parish; she has a sister, Julie, and a brother, musician John Parish. She was educated at the local Preston School and Yeovil College. She began acting at an early age and believes her first stage appearance was aged two in a pantomime in the village of Tintinhull in Somerset, playing the pearl in an oyster. She later attended Yeovil Youth Theatre.

== Career ==
After training at the Academy of Live and Recorded Arts in London, her appearance in a cult advert for Manchester-based Boddingtons bitter in 1994 (as Vera, who likes nothing better than "a good rub down with chip fat"), led to a series of roles as Northern women, including Dawn Rudge in Peak Practice (1993), Allie Henshall in Cutting It (2002), Annie Naylor in Trust and Natalie Holden in Blackpool (2004). She starred alongside Debra Messing in the movie The Wedding Date, had a small role in The Holiday, which starred Jude Law, and appeared as the Empress of the Racnoss in the Christmas 2006 Doctor Who episode "The Runaway Bride".

Parish appeared in the one-off drama Recovery. She also starred in the BBC series ShakespeaRe-Told in which she played Beatrice. She returned as GP Katie Roden in series two and three of Mistresses, which debuted on BBC One in February 2009. She played Lady Catrina in the BBC television series Merlin.

In 2011, Parish co-starred in ITV's medical drama Monroe, alongside James Nesbitt. From 2013 to 2015, she appeared in the BBC TV series Atlantis, playing one of the main characters, Pasiphaë. From 2014 to 2017, she played the role of Anna Rampton in three series of the BBC TV comedy W1A. Since November 2015, Parish has portrayed Cheryl Fairweather in Sky One sitcom Trollied.

In December 2017, she played Supt Elizabeth Bancroft in the ITV miniseries Bancroft. The second series was broadcast in January 2020.

In December 2019, she appeared in The Cockfields as Melissa, girlfriend of Nigel Havers' character, Larry. From 2020 to 2024, she has appeared in the HBO/BBC drama Industry. In December 2021, Parish appeared in the Netflix original Stay Close as Lorraine.

=== Co-stars ===
She has frequently co-starred opposite David Tennant – in the 2004 musical serial Blackpool; the Tony Marchant drama Recovery; the 2006 Doctor Who Christmas special episode, "The Runaway Bride"; in the third series of the ITV crime drama Broadchurch; You, Me and Him. She has joked: "We're like George and Mildred – in 20 years' time we'll probably be doing a ropey old sitcom in a terraced house in Preston."

== Personal life ==
Parish married actor, artist, and river conservationist James Murray on 15 December 2007 in Hampshire. It was announced in January 2008 that she was pregnant with their first child, due on Parish's 40th birthday. Their daughter Ella-Jayne was born with Rubinstein–Taybi syndrome and died in 2009. In her memory, Parish and Murray raise funds for the Paediatric Intensive Care Unit (PICU) at Southampton General Hospital. As of December 2019, they had raised £5.2 million towards the PICU. Their second daughter, Nell, was born on 21 November 2009.

When asked about her hobbies and interests, Parish cites her vegetable garden.

On 2 March 2018, Parish sustained a broken leg when sledging in the snow. She commented: "Note to self: cheap plastic sledges are for sitting in and gently trundling down primary slopes – NOT a substitute for a stand-up snowboard".

== Honours ==
Parish and her husband, James Murray, were appointed MBEs in the 2025 New Year Honours for services to "children with an illness and their families" through their charitable foundation, The Murray Parish Trust, and as patrons of Friends of Picu at Southampton Children’s Hospital.

== Filmography ==
=== Film ===
Year	Title	Role	Notes
1998	Middleton's Changeling	Asylum Inmate	
1999	Parting Shots	Ad Agency Receptionist	
2005	The Wedding Date	TJ	
2006	The Holiday	Hannah	
2016	Dunroamin	Joanna	Short film
2016	Present	Beth	Short film
2018	You, Me and Him	Mrs. Jones	
2018	Bad Apples	Nurse	
2024	Duino	Didi	aka - Before We Forget
TBA	Vows	Pam	Post-production

=== Television ===
Year	Title	Role	Notes
1994	The Bill	Linda Fincham	Series 10; Episode 134: "Taking Stock"
1997–1999	Peak Practice	Dawn Rudge	Series 5–8; 33 episodes
1998	Babes in the Wood	Roxy	Series 1; Episode 4
2000	Beast	Helen	Series 1; Episode 5: "Twin Pekes"
2000	City Central	Karen Ridley	Series 3; Episode 3; "Everything Must Go"
2000	Brotherly Love	Julia Empthorpe	Episode 2: "Sex and Drugs and Rock 'n' Roll"
2000	Kiss Me Kate	Liz	Series 3; Episode 2: "Magnolia"
2000–2001	Hearts and Bones	Amanda Thomas	Series 1 & 2; 13 episodes
2001	Table 12	Sharon	Episode 10: "Peripheral Vision"
2001	Smoke	(unknown)	Television film
2001	The Vice	Jane Farrell	Series 3; Episodes 1, 2 & 4
2002	Sirens	Ali Pearson	Television film
2002	Impact	Gaynor Crosswell	aka - Tin Kickers. 2-part mini-series
2002–2005	Cutting It	Allie Henshall	Series 1–4; 25 episodes
2003	Unconditional Love	Lydia Gray	Television film
2003	Trust	Annie Naylor	Mini-series; Episodes 1–6
2003	Reversals	Dr. Charlotte Woods	Television film
2004	Blackpool	Natalie Holden	Mini-series; Episodes 1–6
2005	Monkey Trousers	Various characters	Episode 2
2005	ShakespeaRe-Told	Beatrice	Mini-series; Episode 1: "Much Ado About Nothing"
2005	Our Hidden Lives	Maggie Joy Blunt	Television film
2006	Agatha Christie's Marple	Evie Ballantine	Series 2; Episode 1: "Sleeping Murder"
2006	If I Had You	Sharon Myers	Television film
2006	Girls on the Bus	Cassidy Long	Pilot episode
2006	Aftersun	Sue	Television film
2006	Doctor Who	Empress of the Racnoss	Series 2; Episode: "The Runaway Bride"
2007	Recovery	Tricia Hamilton	Television film
2007	Director's Debut	Florist	Episode 2: "Baby Boom" (uncredited role, also director)
2007	Sex, the City and Me	Jess Turner	Television film
2008–2010	Mistresses	Dr. Katie Roden	Series 1–3; 16 episodes
2009	Merlin	Lady Catrina	Series 2; Episodes 5 & 6: "Beauty and the Beast: Parts I & II"
2010	The Pillars of the Earth	Regan Hamleigh	Mini-series; Episodes 1–8
2011–2012	Monroe	Jenny Bremner	Series 1 & 2; 12 episodes
2012	Hatfields & McCoys	Levicy Hatfield	Mini-series; Episodes 1–3
2013	Agatha Christie's Poirot	Flossie Monro	Series 13; Episode 2: "The Big Four"
2013	Breathless	Margaret Dalton	Mini-series; Episodes 2–5
2013–2015	Atlantis	Pasiphaë	Series 1 & 2; 20 episodes
2014–2020	W1A	Anna Rampton	Series 1–4; 15 episodes
2015–2018	Trollied	Cheryl Fairweather	Main role; Series 5–7; 24 episodes
2016	The Collection	Marjorie Stutter	5 episodes
2017	The Keith & Paddy Picture Show	Dana Barrett	Series 1; Episode 2: "Ghostbusters"
2017	Broadchurch	Cath Atwood	Series 3; Episodes 1–8
2017–2020	Bancroft	DSU/DCS Elizabeth Bancroft	Main role; Series 1 & 2; 7 episodes
2018	The Keith & Paddy Picture Show	Charlie Blackwood	Series 2; Episode 2: "Top Gun"
2018–2019	Medici	Lucrezia de' Medici	Series 2 & 3; 12 episodes
2019–2021	The Cockfields	Melissa	Supporting role; Series 1 & 2; 7 episodes
2020–2024	Industry	Nicole Craig	Series 1–3; 12 episodes
2021	McDonald & Dodds	Mariel Flynn	Series 2; Episode 3: "The War of Rose"
2021	Inside No. 9	Dawn	Series 6; Episode 6: "Last Night of the Proms"
2021	Stay Close	Lorraine	Mini-series; Episodes 1–8
2022	Heathrow: Britain's Busiest Airport	Herself - Narrator	Series 8; Episodes 1–3
2024	Geek Girl	Jude Paignton	Series 1; 8 episodes
2024	Curfew	DI Pamela Green	Main cast; Episodes 1–6
2024	DNA Journey	Herself	Series 5; Episode 3: "James Nesbit and Sarah Parish"
2024, 2026	Piglets	Superintendent Julie Spry	Main cast; Series 1 & 2, 12 episodes
2025	The Celebrity Inner Circle	Herself - Contestant	Episode 2

== Awards and nominations ==
Year	Award	Category	Nominated work	Result	Ref.
2003	National Television Awards	Most Popular Actress	Cutting It	Nominated	
2006	Gold Derby Awards	TV Movie/Mini Supporting Actress	Blackpool	Nominated	
