= Dean Lennox Kelly =

English actor and voice over artist (born 1975)

- Born: 30 November 1975 (age 50); Lytham St Annes, Lancashire, England
- Occupations: Actor and voice over artist
- Years active: 1997–present
- Relatives: Craig Kelly (brother)

Dean Lennox Kelly (born 30 November 1975) is an English actor and voice over artist. He is known for his television roles as Kev Ball in Shameless and Meredith Rutter in Jamestown.

== Early life ==
Kelly is from Lytham St Annes, Lancashire. He trained at the Bristol Old Vic Theatre School, where his classmates included Richard Coyle and Oded Fehr. He is the brother of actor Craig Kelly.

== Career ==
Kelly is best known for his role playing Kev Ball in Channel 4's Shameless. Other television credits include Maisie Raine, Tipping the Velvet, ShakespeaRe-Told and The Worst Week of My Life. He had parts in the films The Lowdown and Mike Bassett: England Manager. In 2006 he took a lead role in BBC One's drama series Sorted, which is about a group of postmen.

On 1 January 2007 he starred in ITV Drama Dead Clever alongside Suranne Jones. He left Shameless after the first episode of the fourth series along with his co-star and on screen girlfriend, Maxine Peake. In 2007, he appeared as William Shakespeare in the episode "The Shakespeare Code" of the BBC One science-fiction series Doctor Who.

In March 2008, he appeared as one of Jesus' disciples, James, in the BBC drama The Passion, a retelling of the last days of Jesus' life. In May, he appeared as Hedley, the landlord of the local pub in BBC drama The Invisibles, a story of two retired crooks returning to Britain from abroad. Hedley then joins the twosome later in the series. In January and February 2009, he appeared in two episodes of Being Human as a werewolf named Tully.

He starred in Frequently Asked Questions About Time Travel a comedy sci-fi film with Chris O'Dowd, Marc Wootton and Anna Faris, ITV drama Married Single Other with Ralf Little and Miranda Raison, the BBC mini-series Cranford as a poor man struggling to feed his six children and wife, and in Robin Hood as Robin's father, Malcolm.

In 2002, he starred as Private Willie McNess in the major motion picture Deathwatch, a 2002 European horror film directed by Michael J. Bassett. He narrated a documentary style DVD about the Great Britain national rugby league team during the 2005 Rugby League Tri-Nations, titled League of Their Own. He was also narrator of the first couple of seasons of The Real Hustle.

In 2009 he starred alongside his brother in the ITV1 drama Collision which ran over five consecutive nights in November. In 2010, he played industrialist Christoper Rawson in BBC drama The Secret Diaries of Miss Anne Lister. In 2013 he played Ian, the boyfriend of the title character, in the BBC One drama series Frankie.

In 2013, he took on the role of Danny, a soldier facing his fears in the short film On The Bridge, based on a true story and shot entirely on Waterloo Bridge.

Empire had announced that Kelly would be voicing the role of John Lennon for the then-upcoming 3D remake of Yellow Submarine before the project was cancelled. However, in late 2011, he appeared as the narrator on the interactive Apple iBooks version of Yellow Submarine.

In 2015, he appeared in the BBC TV series Death in Paradise. In 2016, he played Carmichael in Silent Witness. In 2020, he appeared in an episode of Sick of It. He had a recurring role as Pekka Rollins in Shadow and Bone (2021-22).

== Filmography ==
=== Film ===
Year	Title	Role	Notes
1996	The Levels	Rick	
1998	Still Crazy	Pizza Boy	
2000	Saving Grace	Bob	
2000	The Low Down	Mike	
2001	H3	Ciaran	
2001	Mike Bassett: England Manager	Kevin 'Tonka' Tonkinson	
2002	Deathwatch	Private Willie McNess	
2005	The Secret Life of Words	Liam	
2005	Ashes	Father	Short film
2009	Frequently Asked Questions About Time Travel	Pete	
2013	On the Bridge	Danny	Short film
2019	Trick or Treat	Dan Kielty	

=== Television ===
==== Acting ====
Year	Title	Role	Notes
1998	Peak Practice	Martin Beasley	Episodes: “Body and Soul” and “A Child I Dreamed”
1999	City Central	Robbie Foster	Episode: “Second Time Around”
1999	Maisie Raine	T.I. Chris Mallory	Main role (series 2; 6 episodes)
2000	Border Cafe	Danesy	Main role (miniseries; 8 episodes)
2001	The Bill	Robert Slade	Episode: “Eye of the Lens”
2002	The American Embassy	(unknown)	Episode: “Long Live the King”
2002	Tipping the Velvet	Tony Reeves	Miniseries; 1 episode
2002	Impact	Scott	Main role (miniseries; 2 episodes)
2004	The Worst Week of My Life	Dom	Recurring role; 6 episodes
2004–2007, 2011, 2013	Shameless	Kev Ball	Main role, (series 1–3); recurring (series 4–11; 3 episodes)
2005	The Brief	Michael Westlake	Episode: “Blame”
2005	ShakespeaRe-Told	Puck	Episode: “A Midsummer Night's Dream”
2006	Comedy Lab	Lindsay Carol	Episode: “FM”
2006	Sorted	Dex	Main role; 6 episodes
2007	Dead Clever	Ian Bottomley	Television film
2007	Doctor Who	William Shakespeare	Episode: “The Shakespeare Code”
2007	Cranford	Job Gregson	Episodes: “August 1842”, “November 1842” and “April 1843”
2008	The Passion	Apostle James	Miniseries: 3 episodes
2008	The Invisibles	Hadley Huthwaite	Main role (miniseries; 6 episodes)
2009	Being Human	Tully	Episodes: “Flotsam and Jetsam” and “Tully”
2009	Robin Hood	Malcolm	Episode: “Bad Blood”
2009	Collision	Danny Rampton	Main role (miniseries; 5 episodes)
2010	The Secret Diaries of Miss Anne Lister	Christopher Rawson	Television film
2010	Married Single Other	Dickie	Main role; 6 episodes
2011	Inspector George Gently	Sgt. Molloy	Episode: “Goodbye China”
2011	Moving On	Sam	Episode: “Tour of Duty”
2013	Frankie	Ian Hargrave	Main role; 6 episodes
2014	Fleming: The Man Who Would Be Bond	Sergeant Dixon	Miniseries; 2 episodes
2015	Death in Paradise	Jake Peters	Episode: “Hidden Secrets”
2016	Silent Witness	Carmichael	Episodes: “After the Fall: Parts 1 and 2”
2017–2019	Jamestown	Meredith Rutter	Main role (series 1–3; 24 episodes)
2020	Sick of It	Tony	Episode: “Useless Lump”
2021–2023	Shadow and Bone	Pekka Rollins	Recurring role; 9 episodes
2022	The Walk-In	Jack Renshaw's Father	Miniseries; 3 episodes
2023	Tom Jones	Black George Seagrim	Miniseries; 4 episodes
2023	Maryland	Jacob	Miniseries; 3 episodes
2023, 2024	Jamie Johnson FC	Wayne Cooper	Episodes: “Breaking the Shackles” and “Striker”
2023–2025	Brassic	Curtis Plum	Recurring role (series 5–7; 6 episodes)
2024	Criminal Record	Jimmy Leach	Episode: “Emergency Caller”
2025	The 1% Club	Himself - Contestant	Episode: "Soccer Aid Special"

==== Narration ====
In addition to his acting work, Kelly has provided voice-overs for several TV programmes, including:

Year	Title	Notes
2006	World Cup Outtakes	Miniseries; 2 episodes
2006, 2007	The Real Hustle	Series 1 and 2, and Winter Special (2007)
2010	England's Worst Ever Football Team	Television film
2010	How the Other Half Live	Series 2; 7 episodes
2011	Animal Cops: Houston	Season 1
2013	First Dates	Series 1; 6 episodes
2013	Morecambe & Wise: The Whole Story	2 episodes
2015	Supertruckers	Series 3; 8 episodes
2015	Britain's Wildest Weather	Episode: "Britain's Winter: Storm Heroes"
2015	20 Moments That Rocked Britain	Television film
2016	10,000 BC	Series 2; 10 episodes
2020–2025	Murder 24/7	Series 2; 6 episodes

== Stage ==
Year	Title	Role	Notes
1997	The Popular Mechanicals	Snug	Arts Theatre, London
1998	Oh, What a Lovely War!	Ovrtur	Royal National Theatre, London
2011	This Happy Breed	Frank Gibbons	Theatre Royal, Bath
2012	Canvas	Alan	Chichester Festival Theatre, Minerva Theatre, Chichester
2014	A Taste of Honey	Peter	Royal National Theatre, London
2015	The Crucible	John Proctor	Bristol Old Vic, Bristol
