= Talisa García =

Chilean-born British actress

Talisa García (born 1977 or 1978) is a British actress of Chilean origin. She is best known for her role of Kim Vogel in Baptiste and Sofia Perez in Decrypted.

García is also known for being the first transgender actress to be cast by Lucasfilm, and to be cast in a cisgender role in a Disney production.

== Early life and education ==
Garcia was born as a boy in Chile, and was named Joseph. After having been abandoned by her mother, she was adopted by a university lecturer and her engineer husband after she was found in the streets. When she was a toddler, Garcia’s family moved to Swansea, in Wales, and then to London, England, when she was a teenager.

She suffered from depression in early adolescence, and attempted suicide at the age of 13. With the support of her parents, in 1992 she underwent a full medical transition to become female. She changed her name to Talisa after actress Talisa Soto, better known as Bond girl Lupe Lamore in Licence to Kill (1989).

For high school, Garcia attended at the Sylvia Young Theatre School in London. In 2003, she graduated from the Arts Educational School, London, a vocational acting school.

== Career ==
Garcia played bit parts in several TV series and films, until her breakthrough role in the 2019 French crime thriller Baptiste.

In 2025 she starred as Miss Take in the British TV series Frauds.

== Personal life ==
Garcia is fluent in both English and Spanish.

== Filmography ==
=== Film ===
Year	Title	Role	Notes
2004	Enduring Love		Uncredited
2004	The Green Bag Factor		Short
2021	Decrypted	Sofia Perez	

=== Television ===
Year	Title	Role	Notes
2004	Silent Witness	Suzi Bradley	2 episodes
2006-2016	Doctors	Gabriela Da Silva (2006); Maria Perez (2016)	3 episodes
2019	Baptiste	Kim Vogel	
2020	Miracle Workers	Valdrogian Empress	1 episode
2020	Servir y proteger	Bárbara Velasco	
2021	The Girlfriend Experience	Recruiter	2 episodes
2022	Willow	Queen Arianna	2 episodes
2025	Frauds	Miss Take	4 episodes
