= Elizabeth Berrington =

English actress

- Born: England
- Occupation: Actress
- Years active: 1993–present

Elizabeth Berrington is an English actress. She is best known for her roles as Ruby Fry in Waterloo Road, Paula Kosh in Stella, Mel Debrou in Moving Wallpaper, and Dawn Stevenson in The Syndicate. She has also featured in British television series such as The Bill, Doctor Who, The Office, Casualty, The Lakes, The Grimleys, and Rose and Maloney.

== Early life and education ==
Elizabeth Berrington is a graduate of the Webber Douglas Academy of Dramatic Art.

== Career ==
=== Film ===
In cinema, Berrington has featured in many films, including the 1993 Mike Leigh film Naked, as well as his 1996 drama film Secrets & Lies, starring Brenda Blethyn and Timothy Spall.

She appeared as The Little Vampire and Nanny McPhee with Emma Thompson, and In Bruges.

=== Television ===
From 1997 to 1999, Berrington appeared alongside Emma Wray and Tony Robinson in the ITV comedy-drama My Wonderful Life. In 1999, she played Marie Antoinette in Let Them Eat Cake, starring Dawn French and Jennifer Saunders.

Berrington played a heavily pregnant woman called Anne in the 2003 Christmas special of the sitcom The Office,

In 2008 and 2009, she played Mel in Moving Wallpaper, and was in the 2008 Poirot episode "Cat Among the Pigeons".

In 2009, Berrington and actress Shirley Henderson were the stars of the ITV drama May Contain Nuts in which she played Ffion, a snobbish suburban mother. Berrington also played Nicola, a nurse, in the BBC Two comedy Psychoville. She appeared as food technology teacher Ruby Fry in the BBC TV series Waterloo Road from 2009 to 2011, departing after two series.

In 2012, she was in an episode of New Tricks, playing a murderer called Grace. From 2012 to 2013, she portrayed Paula Kosh in the Sky One comedy series Stella; in 2015, she returned for two episodes. In 2011, Berrington appeared in the BBC Christmas show Lapland as Paula, a role which she reprised in the six-part spin-off series Being Eileen, which aired from February 2013.

In August 2014, she appeared in Series 2, Episode 4 of Cuckoo as Sandra. In 2016, Berrington appeared in "Hated in the Nation", the sixth episode of the third season of the Netflix original, Black Mirror.

=== Stage ===
Berrington appeared on stage in the 2013 play The Low Road.

== Filmography ==
=== Film ===
Year	Title	Role	Notes	Ref.
1993	Naked	Giselle	On-Screen debut	
1996	Secrets & Lies	Jane		
1996	The Moonstone	Limping Lucy	TV film	
1998	Urban Ghost Story	Mrs. Ash		
1999	8½ Women	Celeste, Emmenthal Maid		
1999	Onegin	Mlle. Volkonsky		
1999	Mad Cows	Pru		
2000	The Little Vampire	Elizabeth McAshton		
2000	Quills	Charlotte		
2001	Large	Dog Therapist		
2001	Delilah	Adult Debbie	Short film	
2001	Once Seen	(unknown)	Short film	
2002	Domestic	Leah	Short film	
2003	The Deal	Cherie Blair	TV film	
2004	Vera Drake	Cynical Lady		
2004	Spivs	Nigel's Secretary		
2005	A Cock and Bull Story	Debbie		
2005	Nanny McPhee	Letitia		
2006	Missing	Nurse Peters	TV film	
2006	Love Lies Bleeding	Joanna Syms	TV film	
2006	Scoop	Antique Shop Woman (Lucy)		
2006	Are You Ready for Love?	Debbie		
2007	The Dinner Party	The Shrew	TV film	
2007	Fred Claus	Linda Elf		
2008	In Bruges	Natalie		
2009	May Contain Nuts	Ffion Russell	TV film	
2011	Lapland	Paula Cooper	TV film	
2012	Hard Boiled Sweets	Jackie		
2012	Eggbox	Nurse	TV film	
2013	Alan Partridge: Alpha Papa	Bernie		
2014	Night Armour	Sophie	Short film	
2014	Mr Turner	Lady Critic		
2015	Saturday	Marie	Short film	
2015	National Civil War Centre Film Series	Queen Henrietta Maria	Short TV film	
2016	Swallows and Amazons	Mrs. Blackett		
2016	Deliverers	Val		
2016	Rendezvous B4 the Wedding	Auntie Raine	Short film	
2017	Sticky	Mum	Short film	
2018	Teen Spirit	Lorene		
2019	Yesterday	Hazel		
2021	Spencer	Anne, Princess Royal		
2021	Last Night in Soho	Ms. Tobin		
2022	Why Wouldn't I Be?	Alice	Short film	
2023	Grey Matter	Eileen		

=== Television ===
Year	Title	Role	Notes	Ref.
1994	Between the Lines	Pamela Hewitt	Episode: "Shoot to Kill"	
1996	Staying Alive	Leah Howes	1 episode	
1996	The Bill	Avril Stone	Episode: "Hard Enough"	
1997–1999	The Lakes	Ruth	Series regular	
1997–1999	My Wonderful Life	Marina	Series regular	
1998	Casualty	June White	Episode: "Degrees of Separation"	
1998	Silent Witness	Jane Nelson	2 episodes: "Brothers in Arms: Parts 1 & 2"	
1999	Let Them Eat Cake	Marie Antoinette	3 episodes	
2000	The Vice	Julie Evans	2 episodes: "Betrayed: Parts 1 & 2"	
2000	Nature Boy	Miss Owthwaite	Mini-series; episode 1	
2000	Rhona	Roxanne	Episode: "The Haircut"	
2001	The Grimleys	Mrs. Robins	Episode: "An Inspector Calls"	
2001	The Bill	Lynn Roberts	2 episodes: "A Week of Nights: Parts 1 & 2"	
2001	Sam's Game	Irene	Episode: "Slogan"	
2001	Chambers	Staff Sergeant Tina Stent	3 episodes	
2002	Rescue Me	Mary Hope	1 episode	
2002	Bodily Harm	Belinda Chalk	Mini-series; episodes 1 & 2	
2003	The Office	Anne	2 episodes: "Christmas Special: Parts 1 & 2"	
2004	Family Business	Jessica Brooker	Series regular	
2004	Shane	Myrtle	Series regular	
2004	Where the Heart Is	Jemma Harper	Episode: "Never Can Say Goodbye"	
2005	The Rotters' Club	Irene Anderton	Mini-series; episodes 1–3	
2005	Rose and Maloney	Maggie	Episode: "Annie Johnson"	
2006–2007	Drop Dead Gorgeous	Val Sinclair/Duggan	Series regular	
2007	Annually Retentive	Make-up Artist	1 episode	
2008	A Touch of Frost	Babs Sellwood	Episode: "Mind Games"	
2008	Agatha Christie's Poirot	Grace Springer	Episode: "Cat Among the Pigeons"	
2008	Apparitions	Kim Portman	Mini-series; episode 3	
2008–2009	Moving Wallpaper	Mel Debrou	Series regular	
2009	The Street	Jane Miller	Episode: "Smoke"	
2009	Psychoville	Nicola	5 episodes	
2009–2011	Waterloo Road	Ruby Fry	Series regular	
2010	Little Crackers	Terry	Episode: "Goodbye Fluff"	
2010	Ordinary People	Stacey	Series regular	
2011	The Crimson Petal and the White	Lady Constance Bridgelow	Mini-series; episodes 1–4	
2011	Doctor Who	Auntie	Episode: "The Doctor's Wife"	
2012	New Tricks	Grace Cusack	Episode: "Blue Flower"	
2012–2017	Stella	Paula Kosh	Series regular	
2013	Being Eileen	Paula Cooper	Series regular	
2013	Playhouse Presents	Jill	Episode: "Stage-Door Johnnies"	
2013	Midsomer Murders	Libs Pearce	Episode: "The Christmas Haunting"	
2014	Pramface	Hester	Episode: "A Proper Little Family"	
2014	The Smoke	Pauline Pynchon	Mini-series; episodes 1, 5 & 6	
2014	W1A	Elaine Pearson	1 episode	
2014	Trying Again	Gail	Series regular	
2014	Cuckoo	Sandra	Episode: "Funeral"	
2014	Babylon	Vanessa Peters	Mini-series; episode 1: "Cravenwood"	
2015	The Syndicate	Dawn Stevenson	Series 3 (regular)	
2016	Camping	Kerry	Series regular. Mini-series; episodes 1–6	
2016	Doctors	Nic Katchevski	5 episodes	
2016	The Living and the Dead	Maud Hare	Series regular	
2016	Wasted	Denise	Episode: "Come Down Day"	
2016	Black Mirror	Jo Powers	Episode: "Hated in the Nation"	
2016	Marley's Ghosts	Jill	2 episodes: "Fit" & "Blind Sided"	
2016–2017	Tracey Ullman's Show	Various characters	Series regular	
2017	Father Brown	Margaret Cartwright	Episode: "The Lepidopterist's Companion"	
2017	Little Boy Blue	Debra Taylor	Mini-series; episodes 1–4	
2017	Loaded	Carly	Episode: "The Boat"	
2017	Borderline	Mary Parfitt	Episode: "Inspection"	
2018	Death in Paradise	Diane Smith	Episode: "Murder from Above"	
2018	Shakespeare & Hathaway: Private Investigators	Brenda Quintus	Episode: "This Promised End"	
2018	Patrick Melrose	Fleur	Mini-series; episode 5: "At Last"	
2018	Vanity Fair	Lady Bareacres	Mini-series; episodes 4–6	
2019	Vera	Paula	Episode: "Cold River"	
2019	Sanditon	Mrs. Griffiths	Series regular	
2019, 2023	Good Omens	Dagon, Lord of the Files	4 episodes	
2021–2023	The Nevers	Lucy Best	Series regular	
2022	The Responder	Lynne Renfrew	3 episodes	
2022	The Pact	Kate	5 episodes	
2022–2024	Ridley	Jean Dixon	3 episodes	
2023	Fifteen-Love	Carol Pearce	5 episodes	
2023	Henpocalypse!	Bernadette	6 episodes	
2023	Sex Education	Celebrant Samantha	1 episode	
2024	Lost Boys and Fairies	Jackie	Series regular. Mini-series; episodes 1–3	
2024	Brassic	Paloma	Episode: "Heartbreak"	
2025	Virdee	DS Clare Conway	Series regular	
2025	Frauds	Jackie Diamond	6 episodes	
2025	The Power of Parker	Veronica	1 episode	
2026	The Death of Bunny Munro	Charlotte Parnovar	2 episodes	
2026	Tip Toe	Stephanie Dale	Series regular	
