= 10,000 BC (TV series) =

British reality television series

- Genre: Reality
- Narrated by: Julian Barratt (series1); Dean Lennox Kelly (series2)
- Theme music composer: John Lemke
- Composer: John Lemke
- Country of origin: United Kingdom
- Original language: English
- No. of seasons: 2
- No. of episodes: 20 (20 aired)

Production
- Production locations: near Lovech, Bulgaria
- Running time: 60 minutes (incl. commercials)
- Production companies: The Garden and Motion Content Group

Original release
- Network: Channel 5 MTV
- Release: 2 February 2015 – 17 February 2016

10,000 BC is a British reality television series that debuted on Channel 5 and MTV on 2 February 2015. The show is a joint commission between the two channels.

The social experiment series follows 20 British people from all walks of life as they go back to the conditions of the Stone Age and try to survive two months in the wilderness.

The 10,000 BC candidates were prepared and monitored by Klint Janulis, an archaeologist and survival expert. Janulis had spent 14 years in the U.S. military, initially as a Marine and then in the Army Special Forces.

== Location ==
The series was set and filmed in the Byalka Hunting Preserve, near Lovech in the foothills of the Balkan Mountains, Bulgaria. The contestants were filmed for two months from October 2014.

== Contestants ==
Nine men and eleven women from all over the United Kingdom took part in this series, including groups from two families (the Hardings and the O'Rourkes) and one couple (Oliver Farr and Terri Perry). The other eleven contestants each entered on their own. The oldest tribe member was retired private school PA Caroline Mortimer, who was 65 years old upon entering. The youngest tribe member was the restaurant maître d' Alice Harding, 20.

Five of the original twenty participants remained until the eighth week. Twelve chose to leave; three were removed. It was decided by the whole tribe on day one that Steve would be tribe leader.

A full cast list was posted online one week prior to the series launch.

Table key
Remained in Tribe
Walked from Tribe
Removed from Tribe

- Bold italics indicate Tribe Leader

Tribe member	Age	Occupation	Hometown	Quote	Duration
Jodie O'Rourke	23	Event manager	East Sussex	"We've got strong personalities and we will bring something to the group."	Still in Tribe
Josie O'Rourke	52	Bookmaker	East Sussex	"We've got strong personalities and we will bring something to the group."	Still in Tribe
John Paul Mullen	29	Club promoter	Unknown	"I want to show people who I really am."	Still in Tribe
Mike Simms	31	Fireman	Greater Manchester	"I'm calm under pressure"	Still in Tribe
Melissa Snelling	25	Propmaker	Middlesex	"I am really stubborn, so I can't see myself giving up too easily."	Still in Tribe
Paul Barnes	41	HGV driver	Bristol	"Failure isn’t an option. I don’t fail. It’s not in my vocabulary."	Removed (Week 7)
Steve Nicholson	53	Business owner	Unknown	"I'm looking for an experience."	Walked (Week 3)
Paul Harding	46	Fencer and landscaper	Unknown	"We're not afraid to stand up for something that we think is right."	Walked (Week 3)
Rachel Harding	48	Education assessor	Unknown	"We're not afraid to stand up for something that we think is right."	Walked (Week 3)
Emily Harding	23	Graphic designer	Unknown	"We're not afraid to stand up for something that we think is right."	Walked (Week 3)
Mary Harding	22	Student	Unknown	"We're not afraid to stand up for something that we think is right."	Walked (Week 3)
Alice Harding	20	Restaurant maître d'	Unknown	"We're not afraid to stand up for something that we think is right."	Walked (Week 3)
Kam Khaira	39	Housewife and shopkeeper	Unknown	"I am determined to stick it out."	Walked (Week 2)
Tom Reader	27	Digital content creator	London	"It will be a real challenge."	Removed (Week 2)
Aamer Hussain	25	Centre manager	Unknown	"I don't have no skills! I'm just going to sit there!"	Walked (Week 2)
Oliver Farr	24	Electrician	East London	"We’re both social chameleons so we do well in a group."	Walked (Week 1)
Terri Perry	30	Florist	East London	"We’re both social chameleons so we do well in a group."	Walked (Week 1)
Kym Hall	32	Sales representative	Sheffield	"I don't do well when I'm hungry and cold."	Walked (Week 1)
Caroline Mortimer	65	Retired Private School PA	Unknown	"I'm a bit apprehensive about being the oldest member and keeping up with the youngsters."	Removed (Week 1)
Perry Brookes	25	Landscape gardener	Unknown	"I've never done anything like this before in my life."	Walked (Week 1)
