= Impact (2002 British TV series) =

2002 British television miniseries

- Hugh Bonneville, Iain Glen and Sarah Parish as Phil Epson, Marcus Hodge and Gaynor Crosswell
- Genre: Thriller
- Written by: Matthew Graham; Nigel McCrery
- Directed by: John Strickland
- Starring: Iain Glen; Hugh Bonneville; Sarah Parish; Lee Ingleby; Dean Lennox Kelly; Corey Johnson
- Composer: Jason Greenberg
- Country of origin: United Kingdom
- Original language: English
- No. of series: 1
- No. of episodes: 2

Production
- Executive producers: Suzan Harrison; George Faber; Charles Pattinson; Nigel McCrery
- Producer: Chrissy Skins
- Running time: 90 minutes
- Production companies: Company Pictures; Windmill TV Productions

Original release
- Network: ITV
- Release: January 2002 – January 2002

Impact (also known as Tin Kickers) is a two-part British television miniseries, written and created by Matthew Graham and Nigel McCrery, that was due for broadcast on ITV in January 2002. The series, starring Hugh Bonneville, Iain Glen and Sarah Parish, follows a team of air accident investigators who look into the explosion of a commercial airliner over rural England. The series was filmed over the course of three weeks between 27 August and 17 September 2001, with the majority of filming taking place on the Isle of Man, with additional filming in Buckinghamshire and Hertfordshire.

Following the 11 September 2001 attacks, the subject matter of the series was deemed to be too sensitive, and as a result, was never broadcast on British television. The series was first broadcast in Germany on 12 November 2003 as a single feature-length production, under the title Der mysteriöse Passagier. The series was also later broadcast in France in 2007. Notably, the series has never been made available on DVD.

== Plot ==
Chief air crash investigator Marcus Hodge (Iain Glen) and his team consisting of Gaynor Crosswell (Sarah Parish) and Phil Epson (Hugh Bonneville) of the Air Accident Investigation Bureau are tasked with investigating a tragic plane crash involving Atlas Air Flight 231, which explodes in the sky over rural England. As well as all 280 passengers on board losing their lives, a number of civilians on the ground are also killed. Marcus's job is to sift through the wreckage of the downed aircraft – ‘tin kicking’ – to search for clues as to what might have caused the explosion. Despite pressure from both the public and the airline to declare the explosion an act of terrorism, the investigators try to keep their pace to reveal the truth. Marcus soon discovers that it was in fact a bomb smuggled aboard the plane that caused the explosion.

Shortly before the crash, Marcus was waiting at the airport for the arrival of his 15-year-old daughter Angel, whom he had not seen since leaving his wife twelve years ago. Angel had contacted him by phone and was planning to come and visit – and was due to arrive on Atlas Air Flight 231. As a result, Marcus is personally involved in the case. When he finally receives the passenger list, he is relieved to discover his daughter's name isn't on it. But in the wreckage of the plane, Marcus finds a small souvenir that he had given to his daughter twelve years ago. He soon discovers that Angel travelled on a false passport, and was actually on board the flight. Suspicion of Angel's involvement in the explosion continues to grow, and Marcus is forced to try and prove that his daughter is innocent. He must fight against time, the growing anger of the relatives of the victims and the pressure of the public.

== Cast ==
- Iain Glen as Marcus Hodge
- Hugh Bonneville as Phil Epson
- Sarah Parish as Gaynor Crosswell
- Lee Ingleby as Peter Stamford
- Dean Lennox Kelly as Scott
- Corey Johnson as Byron
- Betsy Brantley as Diane Cousins
- George A. Murphy as Agent Veil
