= Willow (TV series) =

2022 American fantasy television series

- Genre: Adventure; High fantasy
- Based on: Characters by George Lucas
- Developed by: Jonathan Kasdan
- Starring: Warwick Davis; Ellie Bamber; Ruby Cruz; Erin Kellyman; Tony Revolori; Amar Chadha-Patel; Dempsey Bryk
- Composers: James Newton Howard; Xander Rodzinski
- Country of origin: United States
- Original language: English
- No. of seasons: 1
- No. of episodes: 8

Production
- Executive producers: Jonathan Kasdan; Kathleen Kennedy; Michelle Rejwan; Ron Howard; Samie Kim Falvey; Roopesh Parekh; Tommy Harper; Wendy Mericle
- Producers: Julia Cooperman; Max Taylor; Hameed Shaukat; Stephen Woolfenden
- Production location: Wales
- Cinematography: Joel Devlin; James Friend; Stijn Van der Veken; Will Baldy
- Editors: Miikka Leskinen; Adam Green; Stephen O'Connell; Tara Timpone
- Running time: 46–60 minutes
- Production company: Lucasfilm
- Budget: $156.8 million

Original release
- Network: Disney+
- Release: November 30, 2022 – January 11, 2023

Willow is an American fantasy adventure television series based on and serving as a sequel to the 1988 film Willow. Warwick Davis, the original actor of Willow Ufgood in the 1988 film, reprised his role for the show. Val Kilmer was unable to reprise his role as Madmartigan, so his son Jack Kilmer voiced a cameo appearance of the character instead. Produced by Lucasfilm, the series was mostly filmed in Wales in April 2021, and premiered on the streaming service Disney+ on November 30, 2022.

In March 2023, the series was officially cancelled after only one season, though Jonathan Kasdan stated that the series was on hiatus. Kasdan noted that Season 2 had already been written and expressed his hopes that it would be made. Reporters noted that the cancellation occurred as media companies, including Disney+, were seeking to reduce costs for streaming content in order to increase profitability. The series was officially removed from Disney+ on May 26, 2023, amidst a Disney+ and Hulu content-removal purge, as part of a broader cost-cutting initiative under Disney CEO Bob Iger.

== Premise ==
It has been more than twenty years since Queen Bavmorda was defeated. Six unlikely heroes set off on a dangerous quest to places far beyond their home, where they must face their inner demons and come together to save their world from the forces of evil: the Gales, who work for the Crone and are allies of the Wyrm.

== Cast and characters ==
=== Main ===
- Warwick Davis as Willow Ufgood, a Nelwyn sorcerer who leads a party to rescue the twin brother of Princess Kit Tanthalos.
- Ellie Bamber as Elora Danan, the future Empress of Tir Asleen, disguised as a kitchen maid named "Dove", who is in love with Airk and joins the quest to save him from the Gales. Alayna Jacobs portrays a 5-year-old Elora. Bamber also portrays the Wyrm in "Children of the Wyrm".
- Ruby Cruz as Princess Kit Tanthalos, the princess of Tir Asleen, who sets in motion a quest to rescue her twin brother Airk.
- Erin Kellyman as Jade Claymore, a knight-in-training. She is the long-lost daughter of General Kael and Kit's love interest, who joins in the quest to save prince Airk. The relationship between Kit and Jade makes the series "the first true franchise on Disney Plus to really center a queer story", according to Polygon.
- Tony Revolori as Prince Graydon Hastur, the prince of Galladoorn and member of the quest. Benjamin Revolori, Tony Revolori's younger brother, portrays a younger Prince Graydon.
- Amar Chadha-Patel as Thraxus Boorman, an imprisoned, self-proclaimed treasure hunter and swordsman who claims to have a history with Madmartigan. He is offered freedom from the dungeon by queen Sorsha if he joins her daughter's quest.
- Dempsey Bryk as Prince Airk Tanthalos, Kit's twin brother, who is kidnapped by the Gales

=== Guest ===
- Joanne Whalley as Queen Sorsha, an accomplished warrior, the ruler of Tir Asleen, the wife of Madmartigan and the daughter of the defeated Bavmorda. Sorsha has since become the mother of Kit and Airk, and the guardian of Elora.
- Ralph Ineson as Commander Ballantine, Jade's adoptive father and loyal servant of queen Sorsha
- Sifiso Mazibuko as Merrick, a soldier working under commander Ballantine
- Kenny Knight as Lieutenant Keene, a soldier working under commander Ballantine
- Derek Horsham as King Hastur, the king of Galladoorn and Graydon's father.
- Talisa Garcia as Queen Arianna, the queen of Galladoorn and Graydon's mother.
- Eileen Davies as Prunella, a senior servant of queen Sorsha who "Dove" answers to.
- Simon Armstrong as Jørgen Kase, a warrior and trainer of Airk.
- Joonas Suotamo as the Scourge, a hulking monstrosity who wears a cage over his head and is a member of the Gales
- Daniel Naprous as the Doom, a hooded robed and masked member of the Gales
- Vitas Le Bas as the Lich, a member of the Gales who infects commander Ballantine
- Claudia Hughes as the Dag, a shape-shifting member of the Gales
- Simeon Dyer as Karthy, a Nelwyn who is Willow's apprentice
- Graham Hughes as Silas, a gruff Nelwyn warrior and Willow's friend
- Annabelle Davis as Mims, Willow's daughter. She was previously portrayed by Dawn Downing in the film.
- Sarah Bennett as Libby, Silas' wife.
- Hannah Waddingham and Caoimhe Farren as Hubert and Anne, two forest women awaiting the arrival of Elora Danan. Executive producer and writer, Wendy Mericle, has said that the intent, at least for her, was for Hubert and Anne to be a married lesbian couple.
- Jane Carr as the voice of the Crone, the leader of the Gales. Chus Lucas and Annabel Canavan serve as the stunt doubles of the Crone.
  - Rosabell Laurenti Sellers portrays the Crone's form of Lili, a mysterious woman whom Airk meets in the Immemorial City As with the Crone's true form, Lucas and Canavan serve as the stunt doubles of Lili.
- Mario Revolori as Dermot, Hastur and Ariana's son, and Graydon's older brother who died falling from a tree when Graydon was infected by an unknown illness.
- Sallyanne Law as Mother, the deceased mother of Elora Danan, who was killed on Bavmorda's orders. Archive footage was used for flashbacks in this show where Law also recorded additional dialogue for "The Whispers of Nockmaar".
- Mark Slaughter and Sam Witwer as General Kael, queen Bavmorda's chief lieutenant and right-hand man, who would later be revealed to be the first Bone Reaver, and Jade and Scorpia's father. Slaughter provides the physical stunt performance for general Kael mixed with archive footage while Witwer provides the uncredited voice of general Kael. He was previously portrayed by in the film by Pat Roach, who died in 2004.
- Kevin Pollak as Rool, a brownie and former travel companion of Willow and Madmartigan. While Rool remained in his home, Franjean was mentioned to have headed south.
- Amelia Vitale as Ganush, a Brownie who is the daughter of Rool through Franjean's ex-wife.
- Adwoa Aboah as Scorpia, the leader of the Bone Reavers, General Kael's daughter, Boorman's ex-lover and Jade's long-lost older sister.
- Charlie Rawes as Lori Toth, a Bone Reaver who is insecure about his first name.
- Christian Slater as Allagash, a prisoner in Skellin who was a companion of Madmartigan and Boorman.
- Tom Wilton as Sarris, a polite-speaking troll and chief administrator of the Dread Mines of Skellin whose tribe is in league with the Crone
- Dee Tails as Falken, a gruff-speaking troll and Sarris' brother.
- Danny Woodburn as the voice of Wiggleheim, a late Nelwyn sorcerer whose voice was heard in his tomb giving riddles to access his treasure
- Julian Glover as Zeb, an old fisherman and former paladin of Cashmere who lives by the Shattered Sea

Val Kilmer and Jean Marsh appear as Madmartigan and Queen Bavmorda via archive footage from the Willow film. His son Jack Kilmer provided Madmartigan's voice in "Prisoners of Skellin" and "Children of the Wyrm".

Additional voices provided by Flula Borg, David W. Collins, Terri Douglas, Robin Atkin Downes, Katrina Kemp, Arif S. Kinchen, Risa Mei, Mark Povinelli, Moira Quirk, Helen Sadler, Julian Stone, Fred Tatasciore, Sam Witwer, Matthew Wood, Danny Woodburn, and Shelby Young.

== Episodes ==
No.	Title	Directed by	Written by	Original release date
1	"The Gales"	Stephen Woolfenden	Jonathan Kasdan	November 30, 2022
In the years following the defeat of Queen Bavmorda, her daughter Sorsha has become the new queen, married Madmartigan, and produced twin siblings Prince Airk and Princess Kit. Airk has a romantic friendship with the kitchen maid Dove, while Kit is in love with the novice knight Jade. Sorsha intends to seal a marriage alliance between Kit and Prince Graydon. She is also affected by the mysterious disappearance of Madmartigan and visions of a new threat known as the Gales. Several Gales, including the Scourge, the Doom, the Lich, and the Dag, attack Tir Asleen. The Lich infects Commander Ballantine, and the Dag kidnaps Airk. Kit, Jade, Dove, Graydon, a knight named Jørgen Kase, and the incarcerated Thraxus Boorman embark on a quest to rescue Airk. After crossing the Barrier, the group are pursued by several Bone Reavers who kill the knight Kase. The survivors escape with the help of Boorman's aid. Later, they find the Nelwyn sorcerer Willow who reveals that Dove is actually Elora Danan and that Airk is being imprisoned by the Withered Crone who dwells in the Immemorial City beyond the Shattered Sea.
2	"The High Aldwin"	Stephen Woolfenden	Bob Dolman	November 30, 2022
In flashbacks, Willow has a falling out with Queen Sorsha after she refuses to allow him to train Elora Danan in the magical arts. Sorsha wants Elora to lead a normal life while Willow regards her as a weapon against the Withered Crone, the leader of the Gales. Elora, Kit, Jade, Graydon, and Boorman meet the other Nelwyn villagers, including Mims. Since the Gales are searching for Elora, the group departs with Willow and several followers on a quest to rescue Airk. Meanwhile, Sorsha sends Commander Ballantine to search for "Dove", as the Lich uses his magic to turn him into a "disciple". Ballantine infects his companions. During the journey, Willow teaches Elora the magical arts but she has trouble activating her powers. Elora is later kidnapped by Ballantine, but not before using magic to create a sapling, although she was not aware of her use of magic.
3	"The Battle of the Slaughtered Lamb"	Debs Paterson	Wendy Mericle & John Bickerstaff	December 7, 2022
Elora's companions attempt to rescue her and fight the infected Ballantine and his men, who escape using magic. The "disciples" intend to deliver Elora to the Crone, who plans to banish her from the mortal realm. Elora escapes and meets the two woodcutters Hubert and Anne, who are killed by Ballantine and his men. Meanwhile, Kit and Boorman split from the rest of the caravan to retrieve the Lux Arcana from a tomb infested with were-rats. Ballantine and his men continue the journey with the captive Elora. Willow and the others intercept them and a second skirmish ensues. Willow's fellow Nelwyn, Silas, is killed while Graydon is infected. The grieving Willow uses his magic to obliterate Ballantine's companions and weaken Ballantine. Ballantine regains his senses temporarily and implores Jade to give him a mercy killing. Afterwards, the group arrives at the one location Willow has been wanting everyone to avoid... Nockmaar.
4	"The Whispers of Nockmaar"	Debs Paterson	Julia Cooperman	December 14, 2022
The group take refuge from the rain in Bavmorda's abandoned castle. There, Willow prepares to exorcise Graydon of the Lich's demonic influence with the help of Kit and Elora. Jade mourns over Ballantine's passing, regarding him as a mentor. While retrieving ingredients for the exorcism ceremony, Kit experiences visions of her grandmother Bavmorda, who is descended from a dark line known as the Blood of the Six. Kit learns that Bavmorda pledged allegiance to the Crone. Meanwhile, Elora experiences visions of her birth and her mother's subsequent death. The possessed Graydon breaks free and tricks Elora into entering the high tower where he plans to complete the ceremony. Willow, Kit, Jade, and Boorman join forces to successfully exorcise Graydon. In response, the Crone tasks the Lich, Scourge, Doom, and Dag with killing the entire group except Elora. Elsewhere, the captive Airk awakes to find himself inside an abandoned city.
5	"Wildwood"	Philippa Lowthorpe	Hannah Friedman	December 21, 2022
The Dag and the Scourge pursue Elora and her friends through the ruins of Bavmorda's castle. Willow uses a flamethrower to hold off the Dag. The group flee into the Wildwood where the Dag and the Scourge are unable to follow. Elora and her friends are captured by the Bone Reavers who are led by Scorpia. Scorpia reveals that she and Jade are sisters and daughters of General Kael, a former vassal of Sorsha. Scorpia also reveals that Boorman was her former associate and lover. The Bone Reavers are outlaws who seek freedom from Tir Asleen and other powers. Willow also reunites with his Brownie friend Rool who mentions that he has a daughter named Ganush, Franjean went south, and that the Bone Reavers moved in next door to him. While he helps Willow and Graydon escape from their trap, Rool is unable to accompany Willow. After the truth about Jade's heritage is known, the Bone Reavers welcome the travelers and throw a feast for her. Meanwhile, as a result of truth plums, Jade and Kit argue, and Elora learns that Willow defeated Bavmorda with sheer luck. Though Kit and Jade reconcile and are about to kiss, Kit is kidnapped by trolls who attack the Reavers' settlement and abduct several Bone Reavers as Elora calls for Willow.
6	"Prisoners of Skellin"	Philippa Lowthorpe	Hannah Friedman & Stu Selonick	December 28, 2022
The trolls bring Kit and Willow to Skellin, their underground city. They are locked in a cage and encounter another prisoner named Allagash, a knight of Madmartigan who took part in a quest to obtain a Kymerian cuirass from the vaults beneath Skellin. Queen Sorsha believed that this mystical armor could save Elora from doom. Allagash claims that he was betrayed by Boorman. Meanwhile, Elora and the others mount a rescue mission and infiltrate the mines disguised in troll garb. Elora accidentally casts a spell that causes tremors in the mountain before losing her wand. After reuniting with Kit, Willow, and Allagash, Boorman claims Allagash betrayed Madmartigan and stole the Lux, with Boorman reluctantly abandoning Madmartigan to reclaim it. The group then retrieves the cuirass from a vault owned by the late Nelwyn sorcerer Wiggleheim. Kit's father went into a gateway in the vault to confront some unstated threat. Kit hears a voice claiming to be her father and attempts to walk through the gateway but is stopped by Jade and Elora. After fighting several trolls with an apparently remorseful Allagash buying them time to get away, they reach Skellin's base only to discover that Elora's spell has liquified the ground. Kit is furious with Elora, thinking that she has prevented her from reuniting with Madmartigan. Kit falls into the liquified abyss while Elora tries to use the retrieved wand to free her. Meanwhile, at the Immemorial City, Airk meets a young woman in her cell.
7	"Beyond the Shattered Sea"	Jamie Childs	Julia Cooperman & Bob Dolman and Jonathan Kasdan	January 4, 2023
In the Immemorial City, Airk befriends the young woman, who claims to be Lili of Cashmere. He also experiences a vision of his sister Kit drowning and being rescued by Elora. Meanwhile, Elora and her companions continue their journey across the Shattered Sea. They reach a cabin inhabited by an elderly fisherman named Zeb who claims to be an adventurer, but are forced to leave when the Dag and the Doom attacks. They escape on a carriage drawn by a mudmander, whom Graydon befriends and names Kenneth. During the fight, Graydon discovers his own magic potential and destroys the Dag, while the Doom is wounded. During the journey, Elora continues her training with Willow and Graydon, but struggles to be honest with her emotions, and considers using the Crone's magic. Kit and Elora also resolve their differences. Meanwhile, Lili flirts with Airk and reveals herself as the one who brought him to the city. Airk eventually gives into Lili, who performs a ritual on him inside the temple. Elora and her companions eventually reach the edge of the Shattered Sea which appears to be an endless waterfall. Elora reveals the Crone has shown her Willow's vision of her death, before she and Kit jump over the edge and find themselves in the Immemorial City where they encounter a changed Airk.
8	"Children of the Wyrm"	Jamie Childs	Rayna McClendon and Jonathan Kasdan	January 11, 2023
Airk claims that Lili, whom Elora and Kit recognize as the Crone, has shown him the truth and will help usher in a new age ruled by her master known as the Wyrm. In her fair form, the Crone invites Elora and Kit to enter an inner chamber, where she attempts to convince them to submit to the Wyrm. During the vision, Kit hears Madmartigan telling her that her purpose is to serve as Elora's shield. Meanwhile, Jade, Graydon, Boorman, and Willow jump over the edge of the Shattered Sea and confront the Crone in the Immemorial City, freeing Elora and Kit from their trance. Elora and her friends fight the Crone, her minions, and the enchanted Airk. Graydon is seemimgly killed in the battle, but Elora manages to use her powers to kill the Crone. In her last moments, the Crone infects Airk, who fights Kit and Elora. Kit manages to use their childhood memories to purge and heal Airk. Following their victory, Elora and her friends depart home, seeking to honor Graydon's memory. In the Wyrm's realm, a still-alive Graydon awakens before the Wyrm — identical in appearance to a short-haired Elora — who asks him to help usher in a new age.

== Production ==
=== Development ===
Discussions about a continuation of Willow began as early as 2005 when George Lucas commented at Celebration III about Lucasfilm going back to television, with Warwick Davis reiterating his interest in a sequel film in returning in multiple interviews. During a May 2019 interview with an MTV podcast, Ron Howard, director of the 1988 film, revealed he had been approached by Jonathan Kasdan about rebooting the film as a television series at Disney+.

In October 2020, the series was greenlit, with Jon M. Chu directing the pilot episode and Davis reprising his titular role. Chu would announce that he had to step away from directing duties due to a production delay and personal reasons in January 2021. Later that month, Jonathan Entwistle was hired to replace Chu as director of the pilot, and as executive producer. However, due to production delays as a result of a recasting, Entwistle also exited the series, with Stephen Woolfenden coming in to direct the first two episodes of the series.

In March 2023, Disney+ canceled the series after only one season. Kasdan stated the cast had been released from their contracts due to the shifts going on at Disney but that there is hope that the series could still pick up at some point in the future. As part of cuts being made at Disney, the show was one of many removed from Disney+ streaming service in May 2023.

=== Casting ===
In November 2020, Erin Kellyman, Cailee Spaeny and Ellie Bamber entered negotiations to join the cast. In January 2021, Tony Revolori would enter negotiations to join the cast, which was now confirmed to include Kellyman, Spaeny and Bamber. Revolori would be confirmed to join the cast in March, along with the recasting of Spaeny with Ruby Cruz. Amar Chadha-Patel would join the next month. By November 2021, Ralph Ineson was added to the cast. In April 2022, Talisa García and Rosabell Laurenti Sellers were cast, with Garcia starring as Revolori's character's mother, marking the first time a transgender actor has appeared in a Lucasfilm production. In May 2022, Joanne Whalley appeared at the Lucasfilm panel at Star Wars Celebration, revealing that she would be reprising her role as Sorsha from the original film. At the D23 Expo in September, Kevin Pollak was revealed to be reprising his role from the film, with Christian Slater also being announced as part of the cast.

Val Kilmer was unable to participate in filming to reprise his role as Madmartigan due to his recovery from throat cancer and the ongoing COVID-19 pandemic, but Davis and Kasdan stated in May 2022 that his character would still be involved "in a big way". Although he had lost full use of his vocal cords because of his throat cancer, Kilmer still initially recorded Madmartigan's lines. This was then used as a guide track for his son Jack, who duplicated his father's voice in the same way that he did in their 2021 documentary film Val.

=== Filming ===
Production for the series began in June 2021 in Wales, with Dragon Studios near Llanharan being used as a location. During production, five stages totalling 28,000 square feet were constructed at Dragon Studios. The set for Tir Asleen Castle was built on a six-acre lot at Dragon Studios. In addition, a set for the "Immemorial City" was constructed at Dragon Studios, which drew inspiration from Blade Runner 2049. Lucasfilm also built 20 additional buildings around Dragon Studios for the purposes of creature creation, puppeteering work, special effects constructions, and costumes. To comply with local COVID-19 pandemic health and safety guidelines, these buildings were built with substantial space and ventilation.

In addition to Dragon Studios, filming took place at 32 locations across Wales including Pendine Sands, Morlais Quarry, Merthyr Mawr, Neath Abbey, Snowdonia, and Holyhead. For the production, Lucasfilm received funding from Creative Wales to hire 25 trainees for six months. Lucasfilm also hired 335 full-time crew members including 206 Welsh citizens. Due to a determined effort to hire local crew in senior roles, 17 of the 29 production departments were led by Welsh citizens. Non-Welsh crew were also paired with Welsh citizens. Significant post-production work also took places in Wales.

=== Music ===
The score for the series is composed by James Newton Howard and Xander Rodzinski and includes the themes from the film composed by James Horner.

Willow: Vol. 1 (Episodes 1-3)
No.	Title	Length
1.	"Hidden Away"	2:13
2.	"One Day"	1:13
3.	"A Reputation"	2:05
4.	"Until That Day"	1:48
5.	"Castle Romances"	1:27
6.	"I'll Go"	4:30
7.	"Succeed or Fail"	2:16
8.	"Campfire"	1:14
9.	"What Happened to Elora?"	2:14
10.	"Abandoned Post"	1:27
11.	"Crossing the Barrier"	1:39
12.	"Vigilant"	2:01
13.	"Royal Heirs"	1:35
14.	"Last Best Hope"	2:24
15.	"This Is Where We Live"	2:09
16.	"Consulting the Bones"	1:54
17.	"Revealed"	1:21
18.	"She Needs Our Help"	2:30
19.	"Nelwyn Village"	2:12
20.	"I Need You"	2:18
21.	"Treasure Hunter"	1:39
22.	"Focus"	1:26
23.	"You Are Extraordinary"	1:36
24.	"Dark Vision"	1:57
25.	"Epic Tales"	1:38
26.	"You're Not Yourself"	1:52
27.	"Outnumbered"	3:13
28.	"The Veil"	1:28
29.	"The Mark"	2:02
30.	"Less Than Honorable"	1:44
31.	"Indestructible Magic Armor"	1:51
32.	"Back in the Wagon"	3:40
33.	"You Did Good"	4:15
Total length:		1:08:00

Willow: Vol. 2 (Episodes 4-6)
No.	Title	Length
1.	"Grandma's House"	1:54
2.	"Evil Goo"	2:57
3.	"Hello Lovely"	1:35
4.	"Voices"	2:28
5.	"Visions"	2:26
6.	"Compounding Issues"	3:33
7.	"The High Tower"	2:50
8.	"No Recipe"	3:31
9.	"I Never Doubted You"	2:20
10.	"Butterflies"	1:28
11.	"The Wrong Hands"	1:47
12.	"Scorpia"	1:18
13.	"Brownies!"	2:24
14.	"Escape Tales"	1:32
15.	"One Ones Left"	2:07
16.	"Bone Reaver Brawl"	2:38
17.	"Truly Live!"	1:34
18.	"Returned"	2:17
19.	"Advice"	1:52
20.	"Wanting to Say"	3:01
21.	"Party's Over"	0:48
22.	"Passing the Time"	1:24
23.	"A Fine Welcome"	1:41
24.	"Manners"	0:51
25.	"Gesundheit!"	2:11
26.	"Cliff Creeping"	1:27
27.	"Betrayed"	2:58
28.	"Fire Up the Troops"	2:40
29.	"Missing Him"	2:08
30.	"Search for Wiggleheim"	2:27
31.	"Prodigious Noggin"	1:34
32.	"A Family Heirloom"	2:23
33.	"Showdown"	2:24
34.	"What Matters Most"	1:37
35.	"He Chose You"	3:30
36.	"End Credits"	1:05
Total length:		1:16:00

Willow: Vol. 3 (Episodes 7-8)
No.	Title	Length
1.	"The Day Never Ends"	1:44
2.	"Breaking the Ice"	3:32
3.	"Zeb"	2:07
4.	"New Girl"	1:54
5.	"Scrambled or Poached"	3:03
6.	"The Mudmander"	1:38
7.	"Combat Training"	2:52
8.	"What Is Real?"	3:08
9.	"Getting Close"	1:40
10.	"Admissions"	3:09
11.	"Not Worthy"	1:54
12.	"Courtyard Attack"	5:22
13.	"How Far We'd Go"	2:45
14.	"Not How This Ends"	3:41
15.	"Harbinger"	2:46
16.	"Bigger Than Anything"	1:57
17.	"Loyal"	1:35
18.	"Into the Light"	1:39
19.	"This Can't Be Real"	1:54
20.	"Try Harder!"	1:29
21.	"The Wyrm"	3:15
22.	"Remember Who You Are"	1:50
23.	"Your Own Path"	1:03
24.	"Help Arrives"	3:50
25.	"Facing Off"	5:05
26.	"Last Gasp"	2:39
27.	"The Most Powerful Thing in the Universe"	2:18
28.	"Closing Chapter"	2:50
Total length:		1:12:00

== Marketing ==
A trailer of Willow was released at Star Wars Celebration on May 26, 2022. A second trailer and official poster were released at the Disney fan expo D23 on September 10, 2022. The D23 expo also featured a panel consisting of several Willow cast members including Davis and Slater. On November 1 during the Lucca Comics & Games 2022, a part of the first episode and exclusive video clips of the series was shown in world premiere in the presence of actors Ellie Bamber, Erin Kellyman and Amar Chadha-Patel.

== Reception ==
=== Viewership ===
JustWatch, a guide to streaming content with access to data from more than 20 million users around the world, estimated that Willow was the third most-streamed series in the U.S. during the week of December 5–11, 2022. The streaming aggregator Reelgood, which uses first-party data from its 5 million U.S. users interacting with movies and TV shows on the platform in real time, announced that it was the sixth most streamed program in the U.S. during the week of December 14, 2022. Whip Media, which tracks viewership data for the more than 25 million worldwide users of its TV Time app, calculated that Willow was the sixth most-streamed original series in the U.S. from December 11 to 25, 2022. It then climbed to fifth place for the weeks of January 1 and January 8, 2023. It later returned to sixth place during the week of January 15, 2023. According to market research company Parrot Analytics, which looks at consumer engagement in consumer research, streaming, downloads, and on social media, Willow had a demand level 14.6 times higher than the average show during Q1 2023. It was among the top 10% in popularity during Q1 2023 before its removal.

=== Critical response ===
The review aggregator website Rotten Tomatoes reported an 84% approval rating with an average rating of 7/10, based on 70 critic reviews. The website's critics consensus reads, "Expanding on the saga while leaving plenty of room for callbacks to the original, this series-length sequel should satisfy fans who've been patiently waiting for more Willow." Metacritic, which uses a weighted average, assigned a score of 70 out of 100 based on 22 critics, indicating "generally favorable reviews".

Alex Cranz of The Verge described Willow as a standout fantasy series that delivers a fun and earnest adventure, contrasting with recent fantasy shows that missed the mark. They found the show to be a vibrant blend of humor, action, and character development. Cranz appreciated the balance between practical effects and CGI and noted the series' successful blend of nostalgia with fresh storytelling. Helen O'Hara, writing for Empire Magazine rated Willow four out of five stars and praised it for its traditional fantasy charm and fun, swashbuckling adventure. They found the series, despite the absence of Val Kilmer's Madmartigan, to be a worthy successor to the original film, with a likeable and energetic cast that includes Ruby Cruz, Tony Revolori, and Amar Chadha-Patel. O'Hara appreciated the show for its vivid characters, engaging obstacles, and fresh expansion of the original world. They noted that while it may not match the depth of Game of Thrones or The Lord of the Rings, it effectively balances nostalgia with new, exciting elements, making it an immensely fun and unashamedly silly sword-and-sorcery show.

Steve Greene of IndieWire gave Willow a B− rating, saying it struggles with integrating nostalgia and modern sensibilities. They found the show initially bogged down by its need to justify its existence and modernize a decades-old story, leading to a disjointed mix of self-aware comedy and serious fantasy elements. Greene noted that while the series starts off unevenly, it finds its footing in the second half with engaging side quests and improved character dynamics. They appreciated the show's ability to carve out its own identity despite its connections to the original film and other fantasy franchises. Alan Sepinwall of Rolling Stone criticized Willow for its uneven tone and identity crisis. They noted that while it revisits the world of the original film with a mix of new and returning characters, it struggles to balance its nostalgic elements with contemporary humor and modern references. Sepinwall found the series entertaining at times, particularly appreciating the engaging action sequences and visually appealing production design. However, they felt that the show's attempt to cater to both fans of the original and new viewers resulted in a lack of clear focus and emotional depth. Despite its potential, Sepinwall believed Willow often falters in maintaining a consistent tone and narrative drive.

Erik Kain of Forbes called Willow an "abomination" and said it was more like a YA drama than epic fantasy. He had the harshest reaction to the costumes, calling them "cheap", and the dialog, which he labeled "deeply cringe-inducing". He reserved his most vitriolic condemnation for the score which used rock music instead of what he called the "gorgeous, memorable James Horner score". Kain noted the irony that the show had racial diversity and queer representation, but lacked diversity as it pertained to characters, pointing out the original movie "had a Nelwyn, a rogue, two filthy little faeries and a baby [while the] show has three teenage girls, two teenage boys plus Willow and Boorman". He summed the show up as "cheesy" and "a dreadful mess".

=== Accolades ===
The series was also one of 200 television series that received the ReFrame Stamp for the years 2022 to 2023. The stamp is awarded by the gender equity coalition ReFrame and industry database IMDbPro for film and television projects that are proven to have gender-balanced hiring, with stamps being awarded to projects that hire female-identifying people, especially women of color, in four out of eight key roles for their production.

Year	Award	Category	Nominee(s)	Result	Ref.
2023	GLAAD Media Awards	Outstanding New TV Series	Willow	Nominated	
2023	BAFTA Cymru Awards	Best Costume Design	Willow	Nominated	
2024	Visual Effects Society Awards	Outstanding Effects Simulations in an Episode, Commercial, Game Cinematic or Real-Time Project	Willow	Nominated	
2024	Visual Effects Society Awards	Outstanding Compositing and Lighting in an Episode	Willow	Nominated	
