= Trick or Treat (2019 film) =

- Directed by: Edward Boase
- Written by: Geraint Anderson
- Produced by: Geraint Anderson; Craig Kelly
- Starring: Craig Kelly; Dean Lennox Kelly
- Production company: Bad Jacket Films
- Distributed by: Evolutionary Films
- Release dates: 5 October 2019 (Marbella International Film Festival); 25 October 2019 (UK)
- Running time: 84 minutes
- Country: United Kingdom
- Language: English

Trick or Treat is a 2019 British thriller film directed by Edward Boase, starring Craig Kelly and Dean Lennox Kelly.

== Cast ==
- Craig Kelly as Greg Kielty
- Dean Lennox Kelly as Dan Kielty
- Shaun Parkes as Clarence
- Jamie Sives as Lesley
- Maimie McCoy as Gemma
- Hugo Speer as The Comedian
- Kris Marshall as The Cop
- Jessamine-Bliss Bell as Karen
- Jason Merrells as Bizzie
- Ben Fairman as Maitre D
- Jason Flemyng as The Taxi Driver
- Frances Barber as Miss Ferguson

== Reception ==
Danny Brogan of Common Sense Media rated the film 4 stars out of 5 and wrote, "There's the occasional plot hole, but given the whole movie feels like a dreamlike -- or nightmare -- sequence, they don't deter from a rollercoaster of a movie that will keep you guessing to the very end."

Starburst rated the film 5 stars out of 10 and called it a "well-executed gangster caper with a killer punchline."

Leslie Felperin of The Guardian rated the film 2 stars out of 5 and wrote, "If you stumble on this in the middle of the night, it’s a mildly amusing, only moderately sexist diversion from the chaos of life these days."

== See also ==
- List of films set around Halloween
