= Jim Hitchmough =

James Hitchmough (21 September 1934 – 11 May 1997) was a TV comedy writer, teacher and academic. He was best known for the long-running television sitcom Watching, but also wrote for Coronation Street and Brookside; and a feature-length TV film The Bullion Boys.
