= Dead Clever =

2007 British television film

- Written by: Sally Wainwright
- Directed by: Dearbhla Walsh
- Starring: Suranne Jones; Helen Baxendale; Dean Lennox Kelly
- Music by: Sheridan Tongue
- Country of origin: United Kingdom
- Original language: English

Original release
- Network: ITV
- Release: 1 January 2007

Dead Clever: The Life and Crimes of Julie Bottomley is a British black comedy film, first screened on ITV on New Year's Day, 2007. Directed by Dearbhla Walsh and written by Sally Wainwright, it stars Suranne Jones, Helen Baxendale and Dean Lennox Kelly.

== Plot ==
Julie and Sarah are friends at school in Sowerby Bridge in 1984. Julie's mother is a landlady and takes on a new live-in barman Ian Bottomley. Soon Julie is pregnant with Ian's baby and the story moves on 10 years where Julie is a successful businesswoman and she and Ian run a hotel and inn. Sarah, meanwhile, has graduated from University and is now a book editor in London.

Julie discovers Ian is having an affair with her sister, literally walking in on them, and when Ian returns home drunk after the discovery Julie tells him that he hasn't had enough to drink. When he wakes the next morning Julie has disappeared, and something horrible has evidently happened: There is blood everywhere, a knife on the carpet and Ian's car crashed into a statue in the drive. Unable to account for Julie's whereabouts, he is found guilty of manslaughter and sent to prison for 14 years.

Sarah has heard of Julie's disappearance and returns home for the trial, but as the memories fade she leaves the past behind, marries and has children. On holiday in Devon she finds out that Julie is still alive and living under an assumed identity. Julie passes on a book that chronicles what has happened to her in the past ten years. The book is published and becomes a literary sensation, with Julie taking a new name. Sarah's assistant is killed in a hit-and-run soon after learning of Julie's true identity, but not before posting a copy of the book to Ian, who is soon to be released.

After he is released, Ian confronts Julie at a book reading in Oxford, intent on killing her; he believes that double jeopardy will keep him out of prison, as he has already been found guilty of killing his wife and cannot be tried twice for the same crime. When a member of the audience tells him that this is incorrect, he puts the guns down, only for Julie to pick them up. They then shoot each other dead.

Sarah returns to Yorkshire, aware of the possibility that the police will eventually work out her part in the story. As the film ends, a police car drives past her garden and stops.

== Cast ==
- Suranne Jones as Julie
- Helen Baxendale as Sarah
- Dean Lennox Kelly as Ian

== Production ==
Filming for Dead Clever took place during the summer of 2006 in Bacup, Lancashire, and Cheshire. Helen Baxendale was confirmed as performing alongside Suranne Jones. Of the character interaction between her character and Julie, Baxendale stated that "Julie does things that Sarah would never do. Basically, Julie is everything that Sarah isn't - she's very straight and plays by the rules and Julie doesn't." She and Jones also performed as their sixteen-year-old counterparts and Baxendale noted that she "had to wear a wig with a big fringe" to appear more youthful. Music for Dead Clever was created by Sheridan Tongue.

Per the Dominion Post, the film was based "partially on Danny DeVito's film War of the Roses, and partially on a true story".

== Release ==
Dead Clever released on New Year's Day, 1 January 2007.

== Reception ==
The Evening Standard reviewed the film, calling it "laughably clunky" and the characters "mainly cardboard cut-out stereotypes".
