= Emma Wray =

English television actress (born 1965)

- Born: 22 March 1965 (age 61); Birkenhead, England
- Other name: Jill Wray
- Occupation: Actress

Emma Wray (born Gillian Elizabeth Wray, 22 March 1965) is an English television actress. She attended the Merseyside Council-funded Glenda Jackson Theatre whilst still at Park High School in Birkenhead; she went on to study Theatre Arts at Rose Bruford College of Speech and Drama from 1983 to 1986, and was given her first leading TV role two months after receiving her BA.

She is best known for starring as Brenda Wilson in the Granada Television sitcom Watching between 1987 and 1993, for which she also sang the theme tune "What Does He See In Me?" She also played a major role in Yorkshire Television's Stay Lucky throughout the same period, along with roles in many TV series such as Boon and Minder, and TV films including Defrosting the Fridge. Her next lead role in television came in 1996 with the drama comedy True Love, created by Men Behaving Badly writer Simon Nye. Nye adapted the drama into the series My Wonderful Life, which co-starred Elizabeth Berrington and Tony Robinson and ran for three series from 1996 to 1999. After the series completed, Wray retired from acting to work as a nanny and she now lives in her home town of Birkenhead.

== Television appearances ==
- Watching as Brenda (1987–1993)
- Minder "The Last Video Show" as Tracy (1989)
- Defrosting the Fridge as Minty Goodenough (1989)
- Boon "The Tender Trap" as Pandora (1990)
- Santa's First Christmas as Holly (1992)
- Stay Lucky as Pippa (1990–1993)
- The Big Game as Julie (1995)
- True Love (1996)
- My Wonderful Life as Donna (1996–1999)
