= My Wonderful Life (TV series) =

- Genre: Comedy Drama
- Created by: Simon Nye
- Starring: Emma Wray; Philip Glenister; Hamish Clark; Elizabeth Berrington; Tony Robinson; Clare Perkins; Gary Webster; Nicola Stephenson
- Country of origin: United Kingdom
- Original language: English
- No. of seasons: 3
- No. of episodes: 24

Production
- Running time: 30 minutes (including commercials)
- Production company: Granada Television

Original release
- Network: ITV
- Release: 25 February 1996 – 18 July 1999

My Wonderful Life is a British comedy-drama series by Simon Nye that starred Emma Wray, Philip Glenister, Hamish Clark, Elizabeth Berrington, Tony Robinson, Clare Perkins, Gary Webster and Nicola Stephenson. A total of three series were produced by Granada Television, and were broadcast on ITV from 1 May 1997 to 18 July 1999. It initially began as a one-off television film titled True Love shown on 25 February 1996, following its transmission Granada commissioned a series of six episodes. Only the likes of Wray and Glenister were transposed from the pilot to the main series, and several new characters were introduced. The series was successful with viewers, regularly attracting audiences of over 8 million and it was ITV's most popular comedy series during 1998. Due to his commitments with other TV shows at the time, Nye collaborated with a number of writers on the series including Amanda Swift and Paul Dornan, who each wrote several episodes respectively. Despite its earlier success, the third series was erractically scheduled by ITV Network Centre and was poorly advertised, this led co-star Glenister to directly complain to an ITV press officer. Speaking in January 2000, he noted that he was extremely proud of the series and was very angry about the way the show was treated at the time.

The theme song used over the opening and closing credits was "I Am, I Feel" by Alisha's Attic, which peaked at Number 14 in the charts and sold 153,000 copies across the UK in 1996.

== Plot summary ==
Donna (Emma Wray) is a single mother struggling to raise her two unruly daughters, whilst trying to hold down her nursing job at St. Mark's Hospital. At the start of the series, she is divorced from her ex-husband Phil (Philip Glenister), and is torn between her relations with two of her colleagues, adventurous ambulance driver Lawrie Johnson (Gary Webster), who is always keen on having a quick snog in the laundry room, or dithering and sensitive soul of a doctor, Roger Graham (Hamish Clark), who treats her like a rare butterfly. Due to the demands of her job, she has no money for babysitters and has to rely on her neighbours Marina (Elizabeth Berrington) and Alan (Tony Robinson) to regularly look after her kids. They routinely give her a hard time, Marina is patronising and habitually gives her parental advice, whilst Alan is a dull and pedantic town planner who frequently gets on everyone's nerves, while his marriage and career increasingly comes under strain over time. Later on, Phil subsequently confounds matters and returns to Donna's life, following an accident that lands him in the hospital where she works. He attempts to move on with a new girlfriend Gail (Nicola Stephenson), her stylish and glamorous lifestyle puts Donna's nose out of joint as she tries to compete with her; whilst concurrently Donna tries to manage her increasingly problematic relationship with Roger.

== Cast ==
- Emma Wray as Donna
- Philip Glenister as Phil
- Hamish Clark as Roger
- Elizabeth Berrington as Marina
- Tony Robinson as Alan
- Vicky Cornett as Shirley
- Amanda Riley as Rhiannon
- Clare Perkins as Bridget
- Oliver Furness as Simon
- Gary Webster as Lawrie (Series 1)
- Race Davies as Lydia (Series 2)
- Nicola Stephenson as Gail (Series 2–3)
- Charlie Hunnam as Wes (Series 3)

== Episodes ==
=== Series overview ===
Series	Episodes	Originally released	
Series	Episodes	First released	Last released
Pilot		25 February 1996	
1	6	1 May 1997	5 June 1997
2	7	17 April 1998	29 May 1998
3	10	18 April 1999	18 July 1999

=== Pilot (1996) ===
No. overall	No. in series	Title	Original release date
1	1	"True Love"	25 February 1996
Phil has been thrown out by his wife Donna. He returns a year later to win her back, with the advantage of a newly acquired minicab as proof that he is determined to settle down and earn some money.

=== Series 1 (1997) ===
No. overall	No. in series	Title	Original release date
2	1	"Passionate Kisses"	1 May 1997
An evening class to train as a theatre nurse goes awry for Donna, and it strains the good nature of next-door-neighbour Marina who is persuaded to act as baby-sitter for Donna’s vexatious daughters.
3	2	"Dinner For Two"	8 May 1997
Lawrie accepts Donna’s offer of a dinner-date, but her hopes for a night of passion are disrupted by Roger, who tries to show off his masculinity.
4	3	"Convent Girl"	15 May 1997
Donna is disquited when Shirley announces she would like to attend the local Catholic school. She attempts to scare Shirley off with nun-horror stories from her own school days.
5	4	"Kiss & Tell"	22 May 1997
Donna admits she cannot decide whether she fancies Lawrie more than Roger. After mulling over this dilemma, the prospect of a day out seems like a relief, until the kids turn it into a living nightmare.
6	5	"Dirty Linen"	29 May 1997
Donna's washing machine decides to call it a day, she turns to Lawrie for help, who tries to make excuses to avoid fixing it. She subsequently tries to sneak her laundry into the hospital.
7	6	"Portugal"	5 June 1997
An offer of a new job and a fresh start in Portugal poses something of a problem for Donna. How will the men in her life react to her plans? Her ex-husband Phil complicates matters further, when he wounds up in the hospital ward following an accident.

=== Series 2 (1998) ===
No. overall	No. in series	Title	Original release date
8	1	"Scary Children"	17 April 1998
Donna is now in a stable relationship with Roger, and her daughters think he is naff and try to throw a spanner in the works. Meanwhile, her neighbour Alan is having an affair with Lydia, whilst Shirely and Rhiannon are delighted when they discover that Phil has got himself an allotment.
9	2	"On the Shelf"	24 April 1998
Donna’s new Mr Exciting, Roger, now takes up Do It Yourself and buys a new electric drill. It soon bores people as well as holes. As Donna wonders what she has done, she watches Phil improving his life with a new job and a gorgeous new girlfriend, Gail. Later, Marina deduces the mystery 'L' woman in Alan's life, she subsequently discovers that he has been having an affair.
10	3	"Flu"	1 May 1998
Simon is disgusted when his father Alan tries to make excuses about his affair, later Simon joins Marina on a shopping spree, spending wads of Alan’s money. Meanwhile, Donna struggles to cope during a flu epidemic which engulfs the local school and her kids are sent home. Alan finds himself in the doldrums when Marina kicks him out of the house.
11	4	"Hamburger Heaven"	8 May 1998
Alan is making the most of living with Lydia at their lovenest, marvelling at her three-bin recycling system; and Donna dreads trying to compete with Phil's trendy new girlfriend, when her daughters try to copy her taste in food and music. A patient has left a ring for Bridget in her will, she later informs Donna that she has a son, Ben, who lives in St. Lucia with her mother. Marina and Simon are pigging out on burgers, when she admits she misses Alan, then Simon summons him round to console her.
12	5	"The Ring"	15 May 1998
Roger says his parents are coming to stay and would love to meet Donna. She's pleased, until she realises that Roger has not told his parents about her daughters. Bridget has the ring valued, she plans to use the money to fly her son Ben over for a visit. Alan and Marina mark their separation with a ceremony involving trees and wedding rings, it is the last straw for Simon, who storms off in search of sanity.
13	6	"Bath Time"	22 May 1998
Donna's daughters astonish her by agreeing that she can marry Roger. But there is a condition, they insist on being bridesmaids. Donna reports the news to Phil, who says fine and adds that he is doing well with Gail. They congratulate each other over a few beers, cuddle up to watch TV and soon one thing leads to another. Roger and Bridget eat their lunch on the hospital grounds, when a Squirrel they have been feeding bites Roger on the finger; he heads for home, where he finds a shock in store.
14	7	"Rabies"	29 May 1998
Alan informs Lydia that their relationship is over and he plans to return home, but when he turns up on the doorstep, he doesn't quite get the welcome he was expecting. Roger is feverish and behaving strangely after his Squirrel bite and Shirley suspects it could be Rabies, he is subsequently admitted to hospital, where Donna keeps a beside vigil.

=== Series 3 (1999) ===
No. overall	No. in series	Title	Original release date
15	1	"Making Fun of Roger"	18 April 1999
Donna struggles to get her relationship with Roger back on track following her indiscretion with her estranged husband, only to be dogged by catastrophe at work, whilst trying to keep her unruly daughters in check.
16	2	"Just the Job"	25 April 1999
A patient's death upsets Donna and puts extra strain on her home life. Marina has a surprise for her husband when she lands a job in his office.
17	3	"Chinese Walls"	2 May 1999
Marina and Alan risk confounding everyone by deciding to pretend they are not married, and Phil tails his daughter when he gets concerned about her love life, however his fears are temporarily eased. An official complaint is lodged against Donna, and she accuses Roger of stabbing her in the back.
18	4	"Gardening Leave"	23 May 1999
Relations between Roger and Donna deteriorate as she mopes around the house, after she is suspended from work. This prompts Bridget to suggest he make a romantic gesture, unfortunately his timing proves calamitous and only makes things worse.
19	5	"Truth to Tell"	30 May 1999
It is the day of the enquiry, and Donna must keep her temper is she hopes to retain her job. Shirley's dreams come true when the older boy she is smitten for asks her out on a date, and Alan considers coming clean about his recent behaviour at work.
20	6	"Moving On"	6 June 1999
Roger and Donna have broken up, he tries to move on by going on a date with a young student nurse. Simon vents his frustration over Alan’s part in a scheme involving the destruction of a nearby area of woodland, meanwhile Donna feels miserable about the prospect of being single, especially after hearing about Roger's newfound love.
21	7	"Climbing Trees"	27 June 1999
A protest at Gatting Wood becomes increasingly rowdy, putting Alan in a difficult position when he gives Simon his full support against the scheme to destroy the woodland. Shirley begins to question her relationship with Wes just as Donna and Phil are coming to terms with it.
22	8	"Making Mugs"	4 July 1999
Donna takes up pottery classes at the local college in an attempt to forget Roger. Bridget is frustrated by Roger's lack of attentiveness, and pretends to have a sore throat, which she discovers has its advantages. Meanwhile, Alan's job comes under threat when his involvement in the recent eco-protest comes to light.
23	9	"Concert"	11 July 1999
Rhiannon uses devious means to trick her parents into performing a duet at the school concert. Alan starts behaving erratically following the dismissal from his job and Gail makes a discovery that will change her life forever.
24	10	"A Proper Family"	18 July 1999
After finding out about Gail's pregnancy, Phil makes a difficult decision about the future, whether he sticks with Gail or reunites with Donna, whom he still has feelings for. Alan returns home from the confines of police custody, concurrently Roger and Bridget announce that they are in a relationship.

== Home media ==
The series has rarely been repeated on television since it was initially transmitted, aside from a repeat run on ITV2 in early 2001. To date, the series has never been released on DVD or VHS.
