= Same-sex marriage in the United Kingdom =

Same-sex marriage is legal in all parts of the United Kingdom. As marriage is a devolved legislative matter, different parts of the United Kingdom legalised at different times; it has been recognised and performed in England and Wales since March 2014, in Scotland since December 2014, and in Northern Ireland since January 2020. Civil partnerships, which offer most, but not all, of the rights and benefits of marriage, have been recognised since 2005. The United Kingdom was the sixteenth country in Europe and the 27th in the world to allow same-sex couples to marry nationwide. Polling suggests that a majority of British people support the legal recognition of same-sex marriage.

- Legislation to allow same-sex marriage in England and Wales was passed by the House of Commons on a 366–161 vote on 21 May 2013. It passed its final stages in the Parliament of the United Kingdom in July 2013 and took effect on 13 March 2014. The first same-sex marriages took place on 29 March 2014.
- Legislation to allow same-sex marriage in Scotland was passed by the Scottish Parliament in February 2014 and took effect on 16 December 2014. The first marriage ceremonies for same-sex couples previously in civil partnerships occurred on 16 December. The first marriage ceremonies for couples not in civil partnerships occurred on 31 December 2014.
- Legislation to allow same-sex marriage in Northern Ireland was passed by the Parliament of the United Kingdom in July 2019 and took effect on 13 January 2020. The first same-sex marriage ceremony took place on 11 February 2020.

Same-sex marriage is legal in eight of the fourteen British Overseas Territories. It has been recognised in South Georgia and the South Sandwich Islands since 2014, Akrotiri and Dhekelia and the British Indian Ocean Territory (for UK military personnel only) since 3 June 2014, the Pitcairn Islands since 14 May 2015, the British Antarctic Territory since 13 October 2016, Gibraltar since 15 December 2016, the Falkland Islands since 29 April 2017, and Saint Helena, Ascension and Tristan da Cunha since 20 December 2017. (Note: Same-sex marriage became progressively legal in Saint Helena, Ascension and Tristan da Cunha. It has been legal in Ascension Island since 1 January 2017, in Tristan da Cunha since 4 August 2017 and in Saint Helena since 20 December 2017.) Same-sex marriage was formerly legal in Bermuda from 2017 to 2022, where domestic partnerships have been available to same-sex couples since 1 June 2018. Civil partnerships were legalised in the Cayman Islands on 4 September 2020.

Same-sex marriage is legal in the Crown Dependencies. It has been recognised and performed in the Isle of Man since 22 July 2016, in Jersey since 1 July 2018, and in the Bailiwick of Guernsey at different times: in Guernsey since 2 May 2017, in Alderney since 14 June 2018, and in Sark since 23 April 2020.

== Background ==
Recognition of same-sex unions in the British Overseas Territories, the Crown Dependencies, and administrative territories Marriage Marriage for expat personnel and dependents only British sovereignty not recognised internationally Domestic partnerships Limited domestic recognition Unrecognised A Isle of Man; B Guernsey; C Jersey; 1 United Kingdom; 2 Gibraltar; 3 Akrotiri and Dhekelia; 4 Bermuda; 5 Turks and Caicos Islands; 6 British Virgin Islands; 7 Anguilla; 8 Cayman Islands; 9 Montserrat; 10 Pitcairn Islands; 11 Saint Helena, Ascension and Tristan da Cunha; 12 British Indian Ocean Territory; 13 Falkland Islands; 14 South Georgia and the South Sandwich Islands; (15) British Antarctic Territory

=== Early legal history ===
In common law, a marriage between persons of the same sex was void ab initio. In 1680, Arabella Hunt married "James Howard"; in 1682 the marriage was annulled on the ground that Howard was in fact Amy Poulter, a "perfect woman in all her parts", and two women could not validly marry. On 30 March 1834, Anne Lister and Ann Walker were married at the Holy Trinity Church on Goodramgate in York, and thereafter considered themselves married, but without legal recognition. The church has been described as "an icon for what is interpreted as the site of the first lesbian marriage to be held in Britain", and the building now hosts a commemorative blue plaque. The couple lived together at Shibden Hall until Lister's death in 1840. In 1866, in Hyde v Hyde and Woodmansee (a case of polygamy), Lord Penzance's judgment began: "Marriage as understood in Christendom is the voluntary union for life of one man and one woman, to the exclusion of all others."

In Talbot (otherwise Poyntz) v Talbot in 1967, the prohibition was held to extend where one spouse was a post-operative transsexual, with Justice Roger Ormrod stating: "Marriage is a relationship which depends on sex, not on gender". The Nullity of Marriage Act 1971 explicitly banned marriages between same-sex couples in England and Wales. The parliamentary debates on the 1971 act included discussion on the issue of transsexualism but not homosexuality.

The 1971 act was later replaced by the Matrimonial Causes Act 1973, which also declared that a marriage was void if the parties were not respectively male and female. Prohibition of same-sex marriages was also included in the marriage legislation of Scotland and Northern Ireland. The Marriage Order (Northern Ireland) 2003 stated there was a legal impediment to marriage if the parties were of the same sex, but the Marriage (Same-sex Couples) and Civil Partnership (Opposite-sex Couples) (Northern Ireland) Regulations 2019 removed this provision. The Marriage (Scotland) Act 1977 had a similar legal impediment, but following the passage of the Marriage and Civil Partnership (Scotland) Act 2014, Scots law no longer prohibits marriage if both parties are of the same sex. On 17 July 2013, royal assent was granted to the Marriage (Same Sex Couples) Act 2013. (Note: Welsh: Deddf Priodas (Cyplau o'r un rhyw) 2013, pronounced [dɛðv priˈɔdas ˈkəplaɨ̯, -lai̯ ɔr ɨːn, iːn r̥ɪu̯]; Cornish: Akt Demedhyans (Koplow a'n keth seks) 2013, pronounced [ækt dɐˈmɛðjɐnz ˈkɔplɔʊ̯ æːn keːθ sɛks]) On 10 December 2013, Her Majesty's Government announced that the first same-sex marriages in England and Wales would take place from 29 March 2014.

=== Civil partnerships ===
Civil partnerships, created by the Civil Partnership Act 2004, (Note: In some languages of the United Kingdom: Scots: Ceevil Pairtnery Act 2004, pronounced [ˈsiːvɪl ˈpeːrtnəri ak(t)]; Welsh: Deddf Partneriaeth Sifil 2004, pronounced [dɛðv partˈnɛrjaːɨ̯θ, -jai̯θ ˈsɪvɪl]; Scottish Gaelic: Achd Com-pàirteachasan Sìobhalta 2004, pronounced [axk kʰomˈpʰaːrˠʃt̪əxəs̪ən ˈʃiːvəl̪ˠt̪ə]; Irish: An tAcht um Páirtnéireacht Shibhialta 2004, pronounced [ənˠ ˈt̪ˠaxt̪ˠ ʊmˠ ˈpˠaːɾˠtʲnʲeːɾʲəxt̪ˠ ˈhɪvʲiəl̪ˠt̪ˠə]; Ulster Scots: Ceevil Pairtnerie Act 2004; Cornish: Akt Keskowethyans Civil 2004, pronounced [ækt kɐskɐˈwɛθjɐnz ˈsɪvɪl]) grant same-sex couples most of the rights and responsibilities of marriage. The law came into effect in December 2005. These partnerships were called "gay marriages" by some of the British media; however, the government made clear that they were not marriages. Before this, an informal London Partnership Register had been set up in 2001 by the Mayor of London, Ken Livingstone, but without any legal recognition.

Since Section 9 of the Marriage (Same Sex Couples) Act 2013 took effect, any couple registered in a civil partnership is granted the ability to convert that partnership into a marriage.

=== Wilkinson v Kitzinger and Others ===
Wilkinson v Kitzinger
- Court: High Court of Justice; Family Division
- Decided: 31 July 2006
- Citations: [2006] EWHC 2022 (Fam) [2006] H.R.L.R. 36

Court membership
- Judge sitting: Potter P

On 26 August 2003, Celia Kitzinger and Sue Wilkinson, both British university professors, legally married in British Columbia, Canada. However, on their return their marriage was not recognised under British law. Under the subsequent Civil Partnership Act, it was converted into a civil partnership. The couple sued for recognition of their marriage, arguing that it was legal in the country in which it was executed and met the requirements for recognition of overseas marriages and should thus be treated in the same way as one between opposite-sex couples. They rejected the conversion of their marriage into a civil partnership believing it to be both practically and symbolically a lesser substitute. They were represented by civil rights group Liberty. The group's legal director James Welch said it was a matter of fairness and equality for the couple's marriage to be recognised and that they "shouldn't have to settle for the second-best option of a civil partnership".

The High Court announced its judgement on 31 July 2006, ruling that their union would not be granted marriage status and would continue to be recognised in England and Wales as a civil partnership. The president of the Family Division, Sir Mark Potter, gave as his reason that "abiding single sex relationships are in no way inferior, nor does English Law suggest that they are by according them recognition under the name of civil partnership", and that marriage was an "age-old institution" which, he suggested, was by "longstanding definition and acceptance" a relationship between a man and a woman. He agreed with the couple's claim that they were being discriminated against by the Civil Partnership Act 2004, but considered that "To the extent that by reason of that distinction it discriminates against same-sex partners, such discrimination has a legitimate aim, is reasonable and proportionate, and falls within the margin of appreciation accorded to Convention States." Attorney General Peter Goldsmith, as second respondent, sought £25,000 in legal costs from the couple, which the High Court ordered them to pay.

Wilkinson and Kitzinger said they were "deeply disappointed" with the judgement, not just for themselves, but for "lesbian and gay families across the nation". They said that "denying our marriage does nothing to protect heterosexual marriage, it simply upholds discrimination and inequality" and also said that the ruling insulted LGBT people and treats their relationships as inferior to heterosexual ones; not worthy of marriage but only of an "expressly different, and entirely separate institution". They said, however, that they believed the judgement "won't stand the test of time" and that they looked forward to the day when "there is full equality in marriage". They had originally announced their intention to appeal the decision but later abandoned it due to lack of funds. Gay rights campaigner Peter Tatchell said that the establishment's aggressive opposition to same-sex marriage and the successful demand of £25,000 from the couple damaged the government's "gay-friendly credentials". He also claimed that the demand in legal costs was designed to damage the couple financially so they would not be able to appeal. He said he was "angry but not downcast" about the ruling and that this was only a temporary setback in the "long struggle for marriage equality".

== Debate ==
=== Campaign groups ===
Equal Marriage, a campaign for same-sex marriage in Scotland, was established by the Equality Network in 2008, with a focus on securing same-sex marriage and different-sex civil partnerships in Scotland. In England and Wales, the first major campaign for same-sex marriage was Equal Love established by Peter Tatchell in 2010. The first major campaign against same-sex marriage in Britain was Scotland for Marriage established in 2011, followed by the Coalition for Marriage in England and Wales in 2012. Subsequent campaigns for and against same-sex marriage have been established by a wide variety of organisations, including the Coalition for Equal Marriage and Out4Marriage, both established in England in 2012. In Northern Ireland, a campaign for full same-sex marriage was established by LGBT rights activist and political campaigner Gary Spedding in June 2012 with the specific goal of challenging social attitudes whilst lobbying the Northern Ireland Assembly to enact legislation to permit same-sex marriages.

=== Political parties ===
During the run-up to the 2010 general election, the Shadow Chancellor of the Exchequer, George Osborne, said that a Conservative government would be happy to "consider the case" for ending the ban on same-sex marriage, although he was criticised for not making any specific promises. On 4 May 2010, the party published a "Contract for Equalities" which said it would "consider" recognising civil partnerships as marriages if elected.

In April 2010, Minister for Equality Harriet Harman from the Labour Party, when asked about same-sex marriage, said the issue was a "developing area" and that the government still had a "long way to go" with LGBT rights. Prime Minister Gordon Brown said the government did not allow same-sex marriage because it was "intimately bound up with questions of religious freedom". During the 2010 Labour leadership election campaign, each of the Labour candidates expressed their support for reform to lead to the recognition of same-sex marriage. Following Ed Miliband's victory, it became Labour party policy, with the party welcoming Her Majesty's Government's consultation and calling for legislation to be brought forth as soon as possible.

Leader Nick Clegg stated in 2009 that the Liberal Democrats backed legalisation. On 4 July 2009, in an article for LabourList, Clegg wrote that "although civil partnerships have been a step forward, until same-sex marriage is permitted it is impossible to claim gay and straight couples are treated equally." Following this, the party's LGBT rights group LGBT+ Liberal Democrats launched the petition "Marriage Without Borders" calling for all gender restrictions on marriage and civil partnerships to be lifted, and for same-sex relationships to be recognised across Europe and internationally. The petition was run at Manchester Pride and Reading Pride in 2009, and launched online in January 2010, following an interview with Clegg in Attitude magazine in which he reaffirmed his commitment to same-sex marriage. However, this did not make it into the party's manifesto. In an interview in July 2010, Liberal Democrat Deputy Leader Simon Hughes confirmed that the coalition government was planning to open marriage to same-sex couples, saying, "It would be appropriate in Britain in 2010, 2011, for there to be the ability for civil marriage for straight people and gay people equally... The state ought to give equality. We're halfway there. I think we ought to be able to get there in this parliament". In September 2010, the Liberal Democrats voted at their Autumn Federal Conference to make same-sex marriage a party policy at the Westminster level. The Scottish Liberal Democrats had already approved a motion at their 2010 spring conference calling on the Scottish Government to allow same-sex couples to marry, describing the exclusion of same-sex couples from marriage as a "discrimination that needs to end".

On 22 May 2009, the Green Party of England and Wales called for an end to the ban on civil marriages between same-sex couples in Britain and in other member states of the European Union. Party leader Caroline Lucas said the party wants marriage for same-sex couples and that married same-sex couples who travel throughout Europe should be able to have their relationship recognised on the same basis as married heterosexual couples. Peter Tatchell, who was the party's candidate for Oxford East at the time, said there is a "confusing patchwork" of different partnership laws throughout Europe and that "for a majority of lesbian and gay couples their legal rights stop at their own borders". He said, the "best and most universally recognised system of partnership" is civil marriage and, "anything less is second class and discrimination".

As of 2024, the Traditional Unionist Voice continues to oppose same-sex marriage.

=== Religious bodies ===
At their Yearly Meeting in 2009, the Quakers decided to recognise opposite-sex and same-sex marriages equally and perform marriage ceremonies for same-sex couples, making them the first mainstream religious body in the United Kingdom to do so. Under the law at that time, registrars were not allowed to legally officiate at a marriage between same-sex couples but the Quakers stated that the law did not preclude them from "playing a central role in the celebration and recording of same-sex marriages" and asked the government to change the law so that these marriages would be recognised. In a joint press release in 2012, the Quakers, Liberal Jews, and Unitarians gave their endorsement to the same-sex marriage consultation.

The largest Christian denominations were wholly opposed to the legislation to recognise and perform same-sex marriages. The leaders of the Catholic Church in England and Wales were vocal in opposition, urging both parishioners and schools within its care to sign a petition against the government plans, as did the Catholic Church in Scotland. The leaders of the Church of England were concerned that the legalisation of same-sex marriage would undermine the Church's position as the state religion of England. The Methodist Church of Great Britain, in responding to the government consultation on same-sex marriage, acknowledged in 2012 that many Methodist churches had, over the previous 20 years, affirmed and celebrated the relationships of same-sex partners, but noted that the Methodist Church would not use the word "marriage" with reference to same-sex unions. However, the Methodist Church would later vote to allow same-sex marriages to be solemnised in its places of worship in 2021. In 2012, the Muslim Council of Britain launched a campaign against same-sex marriage. The Chief Rabbi, Baron Sacks, and the Rabbinical Council of the United Synagogue also came out in opposition to the plans, stating that same-sex marriage was "against Jewish law".

=== Public opinion ===
Laws regarding same-sex partnerships in Europe¹ Marriage Civil union Limited domestic recognition (cohabitation) Unrecognized Constitution limits marriage to opposite-sex couples ¹ May include recent laws or court decisions that have not yet entered into effect.

Opinion polls have shown general support for same-sex marriage among Britons. Attitudes towards homosexuality amongst the British public have become more supportive (or at least tolerant) over time; according to the British Social Attitudes Survey, in 1983 approximately 50% to 70% of respondents of the three major political parties (Conservative, Labour and Liberal Democrat) regarded homosexuality as "always wrong" or "mostly wrong" and in 1993 opposition to homosexuality was reported to have slightly increased amongst all parties. However, by 2003 attitudes had become more tolerant, with 25% to 50% of respondents regarding homosexuality as always or mostly wrong and by 2013, only around 20% to 35% of respondents in each party felt the same way. Liberal Democrat respondents tended to be less likely to regard homosexuality as wrong than Labour or Conservative respondents across each survey.

A 2004 poll by Gallup reported that 52% of respondents agreed that "marriages between homosexuals" should be recognised, while 45% said they should not. The poll also found that 65% supported allowing same-sex couples to form civil unions. A 2006 Eurobarometer survey reported that 46% of British people agreed that same-sex marriages should be allowed throughout Europe, slightly higher than the European Union average of 44%. A poll conducted in September 2008 by ICM Research for The Observer found that 55% of Britons believed that same-sex couples should be allowed to get married, with 45% against.

An opinion poll conducted in June 2009 by Populus for The Times reported that 61% of the British public agreed with the statement "Gay couples should have an equal right to get married, not just to have civil partnerships", while 33% disagreed. Support was highest among those aged between 25 and 34, where 78% agreed and 19% disagreed. It was lowest amongst those over 65 where 37% agreed and 52% disagreed. A majority of both men and women agreed, but support was higher among women (67%) than men (55%). In terms of voting intention, 73% of Liberal Democrats, 64% of Labour voters and 53% of Conservatives agreed that same-sex couples should have the right to marry. A poll conducted by Angus Reid Public Opinion in July 2010 showed that 78% of British people supported either same-sex marriage or civil partnerships for same-sex couples, with 41% opting for same-sex marriage and 37% opting for civil partnerships. Support for no legal unions for same-sex couples decreased by 3% from August 2009.

According to the 2010 Scottish Social Attitudes Survey, 61% of Scottish people supported same-sex marriage, while 19% did not, and 18% neither agreed nor disagreed. In a similar poll in 2002, 42% of Scotland's population supported same-sex marriage. In 2006, 53% of Scots backed same-sex marriage.

In July 2011, a representative survey conducted by Angus Reid Public Opinion showed that 43% of Britons believed same-sex couples should be legally allowed to marry, 34% thought same-sex couples should only be allowed to form civil partnerships, and 15% would grant no legal recognition to same-sex couples. A poll published by YouGov in March 2012 showed that 43% of British people supported same-sex marriage, while 32% supported civil partnerships, and 16% were opposed to any legal recognition of same-sex relationships. Support was particularly high amongst women, young people, people in Scotland and Liberal Democrat voters. Support was lower among the working class, older people, Conservative voters, and men in general. In the same poll, 62% expressed a belief that homosexual relationships had the same value as heterosexual ones, but 47% of people supported the right of the Church of England to defend different-sex marriage and 37% disagreed. A June 2012 YouGov survey indicated increasing support for LGBT rights among the British people. The report found that 71% were in favour of same-sex marriage. Two YouGov polls in December 2012 found that 55% of the population were in favour of introducing same-sex marriage.

Another poll in May 2013 confirmed public support for the same-sex marriage bill, with 53% in favour. A second poll in May showed a similar level of support (54%), and also found that 58% of those who considered same-sex marriage an important election issue would be more likely to vote for a party that supported it. A May 2013 Ipsos poll found that 55% of respondents were in favour of same-sex marriage. A poll by BBC Radio in March 2014 found that 68% of respondents supported same-sex marriage and 26% opposed it. The research also found that young people were more likely to support same-sex marriage, with 80% support from 18–34-year-olds, compared with 44% of over-65s. 75% of women were in favour, compared to 61% of men. A face-to-face survey conducted in 2015 by ICM Research for Channel 4 found that 16% of British Muslims agreed with the statement that same-sex marriage should be legal in Britain, with 56% disagreeing. The survey also found that only 18% thought homosexuality should be legal in Britain, with 52% disagreeing. The 2015 Eurobarometer found that 71% of Britons thought same-sex marriage should be allowed throughout Europe, while 24% were opposed.

Support for same-sex marriage among 18–21-year-olds according to a 2016 survey from the Varkey Foundation

A September–October 2016 survey by the Varkey Foundation found that 77% of 18–21-year-olds supported same-sex marriage in the United Kingdom.

According to an Ipsos poll published in April 2018, 73% of the British public supported same-sex marriage, while 8% believed it should be banned. A further 13% personally disapproved of it, but did not wish to have it banned again. Additionally, the same poll found that 66% would approve of a royal same-sex wedding. A Pew Research Center poll, conducted between April and August 2017 and published in May 2018, showed that 77% of Britons supported same-sex marriage, 20% were opposed and 3% did not know or had refused to answer. When divided by religion, 83% of non-practising Christians, 82% of religiously unaffiliated people and 63% of church-attending Christians supported same-sex marriage. Opposition was 13% among 18–34-year-olds.

A June 2018 YouGov opinion poll found that 80% of British people supported the introduction of same-sex marriage in Northern Ireland, with 66% of Northern Irish respondents in favour. 70% of Conservative voters, 89% of Labour voters and 90% of Liberal Democrat voters were in favour of its introduction. Among "Remain" voters, 90% supported same-sex marriage in Northern Ireland, whereas "Leave" voters supported it at 68%. This was at a time when in the aftermath of the 2016 EU referendum the issue of Brexit dominated British politics.

The 2019 Eurobarometer found that 85% of Britons thought same-sex marriage should be allowed throughout Europe, while 12% were opposed. A YouGov poll conducted in September 2022 showed that 76% of Britons supported same-sex marriage, 13% were opposed and 10% did not know. More specifically, 52% strongly supported, while 24% "tend[ed] to support" same-sex marriage. Conversely, 7% "tend[ed] to oppose", while 6% strongly opposed same-sex marriage. A Pew Research Center poll conducted between February and May 2023 showed that 74% of Britons supported same-sex marriage, 22% were opposed and 4% did not know or had refused to answer. When divided by political affiliation, support was highest among those on the left and the centre of the political spectrum at 81%, followed by those on the right at 65%. A June 2023 YouGov poll showed that 78% of Britons supported same-sex marriage, while a 2026 YouGov survey showed support at 76% (51% "strongly" supporting). 15% of respondents were opposed and 8% were undecided or had refused to answer.

== England and Wales ==
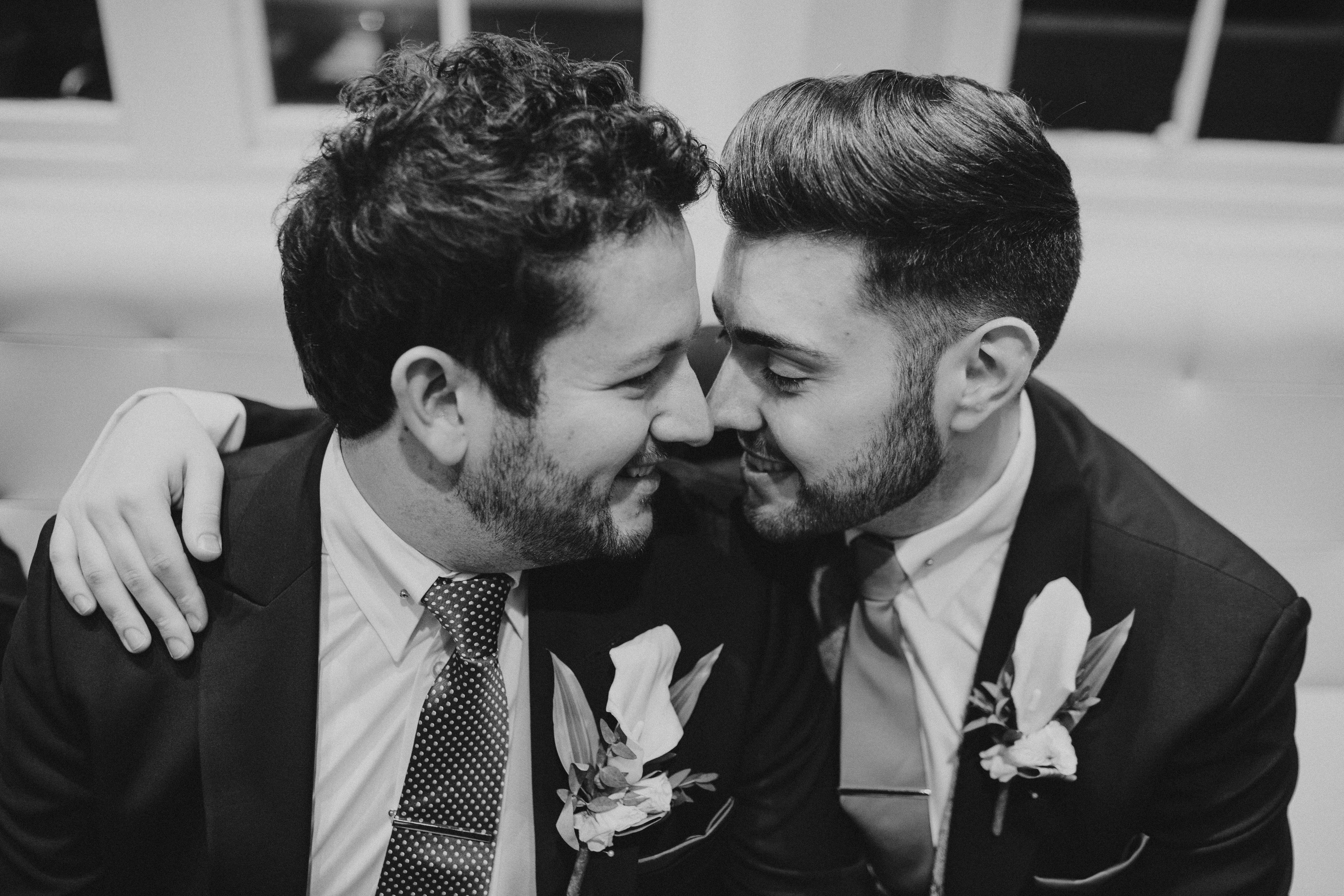
A same-sex wedding in the United Kingdom, 2015

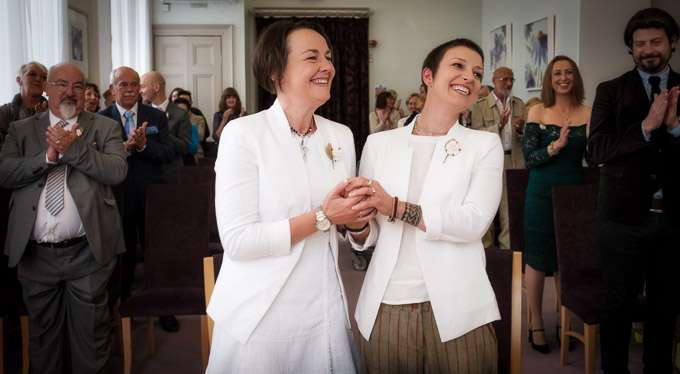
A lesbian couple on their wedding day in Leeds, 2017

=== Background and consultation ===
On 17 September 2011, at the Liberal Democrat Federal Conference, Lynne Featherstone announced that Her Majesty's Government would launch a consultation in March 2012 on how to implement equal civil marriage for same-sex couples with the intention of any legislative changes being made by the next general election. The Prime Minister's Office let it be known that David Cameron had personally intervened in favour of legalising same-sex unions, and on 5 October 2011 the Conservative Party Conference applauded Cameron's support for same-sex marriage in his Leader's Speech.

On 12 March 2012, the Government of the United Kingdom launched the public consultation on equal civil marriage in England and Wales. The government proposals were:

- to enable same-sex couples to have a civil marriage i.e., only civil ceremonies in a register office or approved premises (like a hotel);
- to make no changes to religious marriages. This would continue only to be legally possible between a man and a woman;
- to retain civil partnerships for same-sex couples and allow couples already in a civil partnership to convert this into a marriage;
- to continue to permit civil partnership registrations on religious premises as is possible, i.e., on a voluntary basis for faith groups and with no religious content; and
- to allow individuals to be able legally to change their gender without having to end their marriage.

Several political and media organisations expressed their support for same-sex marriage legislation in England and Wales, including the Green Party of England and Wales, the Liberal Democrats, the Labour Party, and Plaid Cymru, as well as The Times, The Guardian, and The Independent, which launched a campaign called "Equal Partners". On 16 January 2013, the Coalition for Equal Marriage announced that it had evidence of the support of a majority of MPs in the House of Commons. The following political parties expressed their opposition to same-sex marriage legislation in England and Wales: the British National Party, which opposes same-sex marriage and civil partnerships, and the UK Independence Party.

The Conservative Party, the Scottish National Party and Sinn Féin had no official position or a position of neutrality on either the issue or the legislation as it applied to England and Wales. Senior Conservatives, including David Cameron, William Hague, George Osborne and Theresa May, supported the bill, however, the issue was contentious in the party. Just over half of Conservative MPs voted against in second reading, but polling showed that the majority of Conservative voters supported the bill. The Scottish National Party do not vote on English and Welsh matters, and therefore did not take part in the second reading vote, although the SNP-led Scottish Government introduced a bill to allow same-sex marriage in Scotland. Sinn Féin are abstentionist and therefore do not take their seats or vote in the House of Commons. In 2012, the first Northern Ireland Assembly motion proposed by Sinn Féin and the Green Party of Northern Ireland calling for same-sex marriage was defeated by the Democratic Unionist Party.

On 11 December 2012, the government released its response to the consultation. Of the 228,000 responses to the consultation, via the online form, email or correspondence, 53 percent agreed that all couples, regardless of their gender should be able to have a civil marriage ceremony, 46 percent disagreed, and one percent were unsure or did not answer the question. The government also confirmed that it separately received nineteen petitions from faith groups and organisations such as the Coalition for Marriage, with over 500,000 signatures opposing same-sex marriage.

=== Legislation ===
Map of constituencies showing how each of their MPs voted on the second reading of the Marriage (Same Sex Couples) Bill, 5 February 2013 Labour/Liberal Democrat/Plaid Cymru/Social Democratic and Labour/Alliance/Green/Respect votes for: 269 (+1 teller) Conservative votes for: 126 (+1 teller) Conservative votes for both: 5 Conservative/Democratic Unionist/Independent votes against: 144 (+2 tellers) Labour/Liberal Democrat votes against: 26 Absent/Non-voting/Abstentionist votes: 74 Seat vacant: 2

On 11 December 2012, the Minister for Women and Equalities, Maria Miller, announced that the government would bring forward same-sex marriage legislation for England and Wales in early 2013. In response to the consultation results, the proposals were extended to allow religious organisations to opt into performing same-sex marriages if they wish, and a "quadruple-lock" of additional measures to put the protection of religious freedoms "utterly beyond doubt". These are:

- ensuring the legislation states explicitly that no religious organisation, or individual minister, can be compelled to marry same-sex couples or to permit this to happen on their premises;
- providing an "opt-in" system for religious organisations who wish to conduct marriages for same-sex couples, which also allows individual ministers to continue to refuse to perform same-sex marriage even when their religious organisation opts in;
- amending the Equality Act 2010 to reflect that no discrimination claims can be brought against religious organisations or individual ministers for refusing to marry a same-sex couple or allowing their premises to be used for this purpose; and
- ensuring that the legislation will not affect the canon law of the Church of England or the Church in Wales, i.e., unless canon law and the same-sex marriage legislation are changed in future, both churches will be legally barred from performing same-sex marriages.

The government addressed consultation responses about the possibility that the European Court of Human Rights could force all churches to marry same-sex couples, stating:

Both the case law of the European Court of Human Rights and the rights enshrined in the European Convention on Human Rights put the protection of religious belief in this matter beyond doubt. We will draft the legislation to ensure that there is a negligible chance of a successful legal challenge in any domestic court, or the ECtHR that would force any religious organisation to conduct marriages for same-sex couples against their will. Any possible claims would be brought against the Government, rather than an organisation to ensure religious organisations would not have to use their resources to fight any legal challenges.

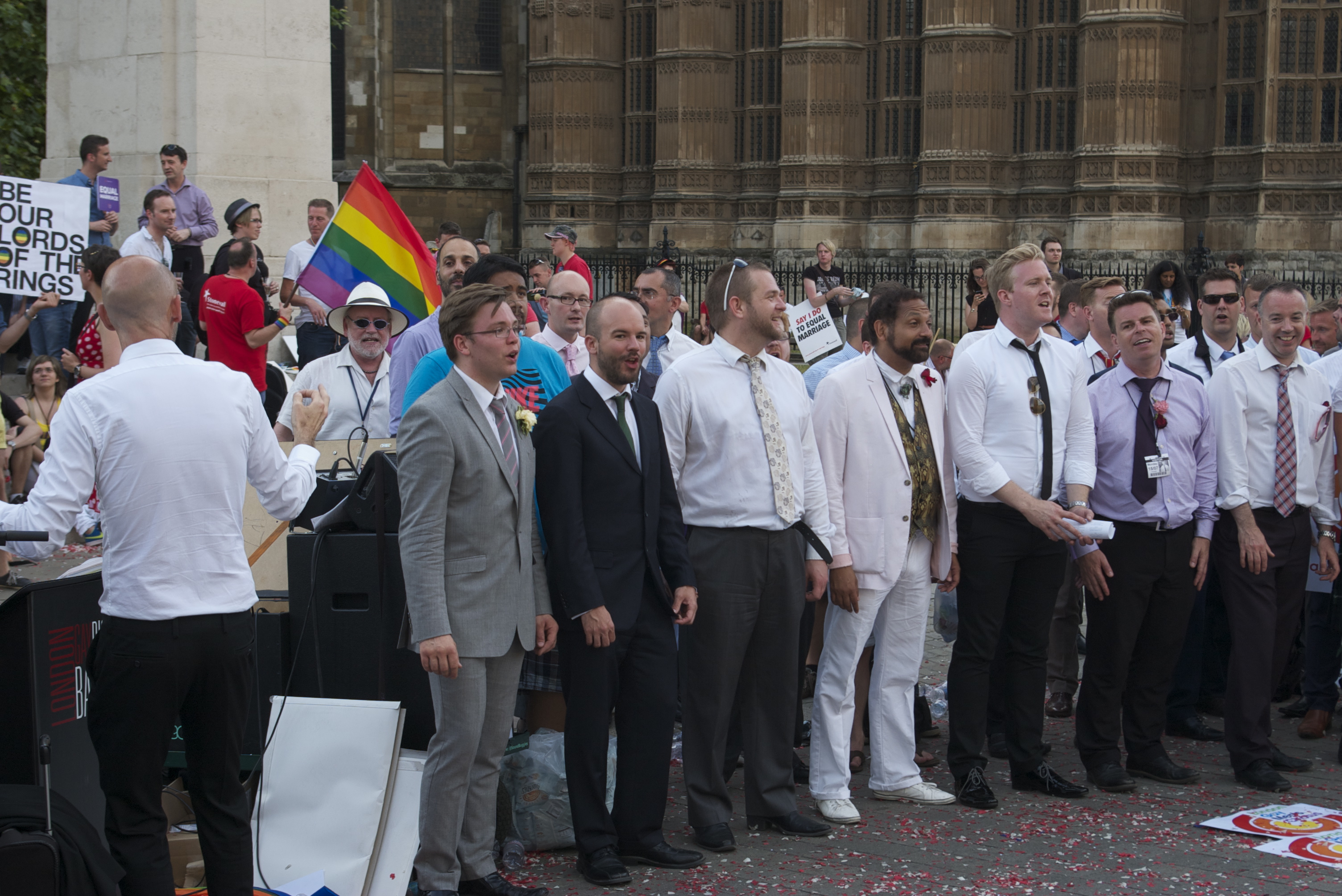
Members of the London Gay Men's Chorus outside the House of Lords celebrating the passage at third reading of the same-sex marriage legislation, 15 July 2013

On 24 January 2013, the Marriage (Same Sex Couples) Bill was introduced to the Commons by Maria Miller, and a full debate occurred at the second reading on 5 February. The bill retained some distinctions from marriage between a man and a woman; e.g. in divorce proceedings, adultery can only involve sexual conduct between two persons of the opposite sex, while non-consummation will not be grounds for annulment of a same-sex marriage. On 5 February 2013, the bill passed its second reading in the House of Commons by 400 votes to 175.

The bill was examined in 13 sittings by the Marriage (Same Sex Couples) Bill Committee, a public bill committee established to scrutinise the bill line by line. The bill completed its committee stage on 12 March 2013 and had its report stage in the House of Commons on 20–21 May 2013. The third reading took place on 21 May, and was approved by 366 votes to 161, with the bill receiving its first reading in the House of Lords the same evening. The bill had its second reading unopposed in the Lords on 4 June, after a "wrecking amendment" proposed by Lord Dear was defeated by a vote of 390–148, thus allowing the bill to proceed to the committee stage. The bill passed its third reading in the House of Lords on 15 July 2013, and the Commons accepted all of the Lords' amendments on the following day, with royal assent by Queen Elizabeth II granted on 17 July 2013.

21 May 2013 vote in the House of Commons
Party	Voted for	Voted against	Absent (Did not vote)
G Conservative Party	124: Stuart Andrew; Harriett Baldwin; Steve Barclay; Gregory Barker; John Baron; Gavin Barwell; Richard Benyon; Crispin Blunt; Nicholas Boles; Peter Bottomley; Karen Bradley; James Brokenshire; Aidan Burley; Alistair Burt; Dan Byles; David Cameron; Neil Carmichael; Greg Clark; Oliver Colvile; Tracey Crouch; Stephen Dorrell; James Duddridge; Alan Duncan; Iain Duncan Smith; Michael Ellis; Jane Ellison; Tobias Ellwood; Graham Evans (Note: MPs Graham Evans, John Howell, Andrea Leadsom, Phillip Lee, Charlotte Leslie, Claire Perry and Rob Wilson voted both "aye" and "no", likely as a means of registering an abstention.); Michael Fabricant; Mark Field; Mike Freer; Lorraine Fullbrook; Richard Fuller; David Gauke; Nick Gibb; Zac Goldsmith; Michael Gove; Helen Grant; Chris Grayling; Damian Green; Justine Greening; Ben Gummer; Sam Gyimah; Stephen Hammond; Matthew Hancock; Greg Hands; Mark Harper; Richard Harrington; Rebecca Harris; Chris Heaton-Harris; Charles Hendry; Nick Herbert; Damian Hinds; George Hollingbery; Kris Hopkins; John Howell; Jeremy Hunt; Margot James; Sajid Javid; Bernard Jenkin; Jo Johnson; Andrew Jones; Daniel Kawczynski; Simon Kirby; Andrew Lansley; Pauline Latham; Andrea Leadsom; Jessica Lee; Phillip Lee; Charlotte Leslie; Oliver Letwin; Brandon Lewis; Peter Luff; Mary Macleod; Francis Maude; Theresa May; Jason McCartney; Patrick McLoughlin; Mark Menzies; Maria Miller; Nigel Mills; Andrew Mitchell; Penny Mordaunt; Stephen Mosley; David Mowat; Brooks Newmark; Eric Ollerenshaw; Guy Opperman; George Osborne; Richard Ottaway; John Penrose; Andrew Percy; Claire Perry; Stephen Phillips; Eric Pickles; Dan Poulter; Dominic Raab; Hugh Robertson; Amber Rudd; Laura Sandys; Grant Shapps; Mark Simmonds; Chris Skidmore; Chloe Smith; Julian Smith; Anna Soubry; Caroline Spelman; Andrew Stephenson; Iain Stewart; Justin Tomlinson; Liz Truss; Edward Vaizey; Theresa Villiers; Charles Walker; Robin Walker; Angela Watkinson; Mike Weatherley; Chris White; David Willetts; Rob Wilson; Sarah Wollaston; Tim Yeo; George Young; Nadhim Zahawi	134: Nigel Adams; Adam Afriyie; Peter Aldous; David Amess; Richard Bacon; Guto Bebb; Henry Bellingham; Paul Beresford; Andrew Bingham; Nicola Blackwood; Peter Bone; Graham Brady; Julian Brazier; Andrew Bridgen; Steve Brine; Fiona Bruce; Robert Buckland; Simon Burns; David Burrowes; Douglas Carswell; William Cash; Rehman Chishti; Christopher Chope; Thérèse Coffey; Geoffrey Cox; Stephen Crabb; David Davies; Glyn Davies; Philip Davies; David Davis; Nick de Bois; Nadine Dorries; Jackie Doyle-Price; Richard Drax; Charlie Elphicke; Graham Evans; Jonathan Evans; David Evennett; Liam Fox; Mark Francois; George Freeman; Roger Gale; Edward Garnier; Mark Garnier; Cheryl Gillan; John Glen; Robert Goodwill; James Gray; Andrew Griffiths; Robert Halfon; Simon Hart; Alan Haselhurst; John Hayes; Oliver Heald; Gordon Henderson; Philip Hollobone; Adam Holloway; Gerald Howarth; John Howell; Stewart Jackson; Gareth Johnson; David Jones; Marcus Jones; Greg Knight; Kwasi Kwarteng; Andrea Leadsom; Phillip Lee; Jeremy Lefroy; Edward Leigh; Charlotte Leslie; Julian Lewis; Ian Liddell-Grainger; David Lidington; Peter Lilley; Jonathan Lord; Tim Loughton; Karen Lumley; Anne Main; Paul Maynard; Karl McCartney; Anne McIntosh; Stephen McPartland; Esther McVey; Stephen Metcalfe; Anne Milton; Nicky Morgan; Anne-Marie Morris; David Morris; James Morris; Bob Neill; David Nuttall; Stephen O'Brien; Matthew Offord; James Paice; Neil Parish; Priti Patel; Owen Paterson; Mark Pawsey; Michael Penning; Claire Perry; Mark Pritchard; John Redwood; Jacob Rees-Mogg; Malcolm Rifkind; Andrew Robathan; Laurence Robertson; Andrew Rosindell; David Rutley; Lee Scott; Andrew Selous; Alec Shelbrooke; Richard Shepherd; Henry Smith; John Stanley; John Stevenson; Bob Stewart; Mel Stride; Julian Sturdy; Robert Syms; David Tredinnick; Andrew Turner; Shailesh Vara; Martin Vickers; Ben Wallace; Robert Walter; James Wharton; Heather Wheeler; Craig Whittaker; John Whittingdale; Bill Wiggin; Gavin Williamson; Rob Wilson; Jeremy Wright	50: James Arbuthnot; Steven Baker; Tony Baldry; Jake Berry; Brian Binley; Bob Blackman; Angie Bray; Conor Burns; Alun Cairns; James Clappison; Kenneth Clarke; Geoffrey Clifton-Brown; Damian Collins; Caroline Dinenage; Jonathan Djanogly; George Eustice; Michael Fallon; Richard Graham; Dominic Grieve; William Hague; Philip Hammond; Mark Hoban; Nick Hurd; Greg Knight; Eleanor Laing; Jack Lopresti; Patrick Mercer; David Mundell; Sheryll Murray; Andrew Murrison; Sarah Newton; Caroline Nokes; Jesse Norman; Christopher Pincher; Mark Prisk; Mark Reckless; Simon Reevell; David Ruffley; Alok Sharma; Keith Simpson; Nicholas Soames; Mark Spencer; Rory Stewart; Gary Streeter; Graham Stuart; Hugo Swire; Peter Tapsell; Edward Timpson; Andrew Tyrie; Paul Uppal
Labour Party	194: Diane Abbott; Debbie Abrahams; Douglas Alexander; Heidi Alexander; Rushanara Ali; Graham Allen; Jonathan Ashworth; Adrian Bailey; William Bain; Edward Balls; Gordon Banks; Kevin Barron; Hugh Bayley; Margaret Beckett; Anne Begg; Hilary Benn; Luciana Berger; Clive Betts; Roberta Blackman-Woods; Tom Blenkinsop; Paul Blomfield; Ben Bradshaw; Kevin Brennan; Gordon Brown; Lyn Brown; Chris Bryant; Karen Buck; Richard Burden; Andy Burnham; Liam Byrne; Alan Campbell; Martin Caton; Sarah Champion; Jenny Chapman; Katy Clark; Ann Clwyd; Vernon Coaker; Ann Coffey; Yvette Cooper; Jeremy Corbyn; Mary Creagh; Stella Creasy; Jon Cruddas; John Cryer; Jim Cunningham; Margaret Curran; Nicholas Dakin; Simon Danczuk; Alistair Darling; Wayne David; Ian Davidson; Geraint Davies; Gloria De Piero; John Denham; Frank Dobson; Stephen Doughty; Jim Dowd; Gemma Doyle; Jack Dromey; Michael Dugher; Angela Eagle; Maria Eagle; Clive Efford; Julie Elliott; Louise Ellman; Natascha Engel; Bill Esterson; Chris Evans; Paul Farrelly; Frank Field; Jim Fitzpatrick; Caroline Flint; Paul Flynn; Yvonne Fovargue; Hywel Francis; Mike Gapes; Barry Gardiner; Sheila Gilmore; Pat Glass; Kate Green; Lilian Greenwood; Nia Griffith; Andrew Gwynne; David Hamilton; Fabian Hamilton; David Hanson; Tom Harris; John Healey; Mark Hendrick; Stephen Hepburn; Meg Hillier; Julie Hilling; Margaret Hodge; Sharon Hodgson; Kate Hoey; Kelvin Hopkins; George Howarth; Huw Irranca-Davies; Cathy Jamieson; Dan Jarvis; Alan Johnson; Graham Jones; Kevan Jones; Susan Elan Jones; Tessa Jowell; Gerald Kaufman; Barbara Keeley; Liz Kendall; David Lammy; Ian Lavery; Mark Lazarowicz; Chris Leslie; Emma Lewell-Buck; Andrew Love; Fiona Mactaggart; Shabana Mahmood; Seema Malhotra; John Mann; Gordon Marsden; Steve McCabe; Kerry McCarthy; Gregg McClymont; Siobhain McDonagh; Andrew McDonald; Pat McFadden; Alison McGovern; Anne McGuire; Ann McKechin; Iain McKenzie; Catherine McKinnell; Michael Meacher; Alan Meale; Ian Mearns; Ed Miliband; Madeleine Moon; Jessica Morden; Graeme Morrice; Grahame Morris; Meg Munn; Jim Murphy; Ian Murray; Lisa Nandy; Pamela Nash; Fiona O'Donnell; Chi Onwurah; Sandra Osborne; Albert Owen; Teresa Pearce; Toby Perkins; Bridget Phillipson; Yasmin Qureshi; Nick Raynsford; Jamie Reed; Steve Reed; Emma Reynolds; Jonathan Reynolds; Linda Riordan; John Robertson; Geoffrey Robinson; Steve Rotheram; Frank Roy; Lindsay Roy; Chris Ruane; Andy Sawford; Alison Seabeck; Virendra Sharma; Barry Sheerman; Dennis Skinner; Andy Slaughter; Andrew Smith; Nick Smith; Owen Smith; Jack Straw; Graham Stringer; Gisela Stuart; Gerry Sutcliffe; Mark Tami; Gareth Thomas; Emily Thornberry; Karl Turner; Stephen Twigg; Chuka Umunna; Valerie Vaz; Joan Walley; Tom Watson; Alan Whitehead; Chris Williamson; Phil Wilson; David Winnick; Rosie Winterton; Mike Wood; Shaun Woodward; David Wright; Iain Wright	14: Joe Benton; Tom Clarke; Rosie Cooper; David Crausby; Jim Dobbin; Brian H Donohoe; Robert Flello; Mary Glindon; Roger Godsiff; Paul Goggins; George Mudie; Paul Murphy; Stephen Pound; Stephen Timms	47: Bob Ainsworth; David Anderson; Ian Austin; Hazel Blears; David Blunkett; Nick Brown; Russell Brown; Ronnie Campbell; Michael Connarty; Alex Cunningham; Tony Cunningham; Thomas Docherty; Frank Doran; Helen Goodman; Tom Greatrex; Peter Hain; Harriet Harman; Dai Havard; David Heyes; Jimmy Hood; Tristram Hunt; Glenda Jackson; Siân James; Diana Johnson; Helen Jones; Sadiq Khan; Ivan Lewis; Ian Lucas; Khalid Mahmood; Michael McCann; John McDonnell; Jim McGovern; Andrew Miller; Austin Mitchell; Lucy Powell; Rachel Reeves; Joan Ruddock; Anas Sarwar; Jim Sheridan; Gavin Shuker; Angela Smith; John Spellar; Jon Trickett; Derek Twigg; Keith Vaz; David Watts; John Woodcock
G Liberal Democrats	43: Danny Alexander; Norman Baker; Tom Brake; Annette Brooke; Jeremy Browne; Paul Burstow; Lorely Burt; Vincent Cable; Menzies Campbell; Alistair Carmichael; Nicholas Clegg; Michael Crockart; Edward Davey; Lynne Featherstone; Don Foster; Andrew George; Stephen Gilbert; Duncan Hames; Mike Hancock; Nick Harvey; David Heath; John Hemming; Martin Horwood; Julian Huppert; Charles Kennedy; David Laws; Stephen Lloyd; Michael Moore; Greg Mulholland; Tessa Munt; Alan Reid; Dan Rogerson; Adrian Sanders; Andrew Stunell; Ian Swales; Jo Swinson; Mike Thornton; John Thurso; Steve Webb; Mark Williams; Roger Williams; Stephen Williams; Simon Wright	4: Alan Beith; Gordon Birtwistle; John Pugh; Sarah Teather	9: Malcolm Bruce; Tim Farron; Simon Hughes; Mark Hunter (teller); Norman Lamb; John Leech; Robert Smith; David Ward; Jennifer Willott
Democratic Unionist Party	–	8: Gregory Campbell; Nigel Dodds; Jeffrey Donaldson; William McCrea; Ian Paisley Jr; Jim Shannon; David Simpson; Sammy Wilson	–
Scottish National Party	–	–	6: Stewart Hosie; Angus MacNeil; Angus Robertson; Mike Weir; Eilidh Whiteford; Pete Wishart
Sinn Féin	–	–	5: Pat Doherty; Michelle Gildernew; Paul Maskey; Francie Molloy; Conor Murphy
Plaid Cymru	2: Jonathan Edwards; Elfyn Llwyd	–	1: Hywel Williams
Social Democratic and Labour Party	2: Mark Durkan; Alasdair McDonnell	–	1: Margaret Ritchie
Alliance Party of Northern Ireland	–	–	1: Naomi Long
Green Party of England and Wales	1: Caroline Lucas	–	–
Respect Party	–	–	1: George Galloway
Independent	–	1: Sylvia Hermon	1: Eric Joyce
Total (Note: The Speaker of the House of Commons, John Bercow, votes only in case of a tied vote. The three deputy speakers, Lindsay Hoyle, Nigel Evans and Dawn Primarolo, likewise did not cast a vote. The tellers for the "aye" side were Bob Russell and Desmond Swayne, while those for the "no" side were Mark Lancaster and John Randall.)	366	161	122
Total	56.4%	24.8%	18.8%

The Marriage (Same Sex Couples) Act 2013 (Part 1, Section 1) states: Marriage of same sex couples is lawful. It also contains provisions stating that:

In the law of England and Wales, marriage has the same effect in relation to same sex couples as it has in relation to opposite sex couples. (Note: Welsh: Yng nghyfraith Lloegr a Cymru, mae priodas cyplau o'r un rhyw yn cael yr un effaith â phriodas cyplau o'r rhyw arall.)

On 10 December 2013, Miller announced that same-sex marriage ceremonies would begin on 29 March 2014 in England and Wales. Couples wishing to be among the first to marry were required to give formal notice of their intention by 13 March 2014. As of 13 March 2014, couples who have entered into same-sex marriages overseas are recognised as married in England and Wales. The parts of the law that allow civil partnerships to be converted into marriages, and allow married people to change their legal gender while remaining married, took effect on 10 December 2014. Same-sex marriages in England and Wales began at midnight on 29 March 2014.

== Scotland ==
Same-sex marriage has been legal in Scotland since 16 December 2014, with the first same-sex marriages occurring on 31 December 2014. The law provides that religious organisations and individual celebrants are under no obligation to perform marriage ceremonies for same-sex couples, though religious organisations are permitted to authorise their clergy to do so.

On 25 July 2012, the Scottish Government announced that it would legalise same-sex marriage. The move was announced despite opposition by the Church of Scotland and the Catholic Church in Scotland. Although Deputy First Minister Nicola Sturgeon announced the move as the "right thing to do", she reassured churches that they would not be forced to perform same-sex marriages. During the consultation phase, ministers received over 19,000 messages from constituents about the issue. On 27 June 2013, the government introduced same-sex marriage legislation to the Scottish Parliament. On 4 February 2014, the Scottish Parliament held its final reading on the bill to permit same-sex marriages. The bill passed by a vote of 108–15 and received royal assent on 12 March 2014. The legislation allows religious and faith organisations to be exempted from having to conduct or be involved in same-sex marriages if it contravenes their beliefs. The first same-sex weddings occurred on 31 December 2014, though civil partnerships could be exchanged for marriage certificates from 16 December so the very first same-sex marriages under Scottish law were recognised that day.

== Northern Ireland ==
Same-sex marriage became legal in Northern Ireland on 13 January 2020. In previous years, the Northern Ireland Assembly had voted on the issue on five occasions, winning a majority for same-sex marriage once. Previously, same-sex marriages performed in England, Wales and Scotland were recognised as civil partnerships in Northern Ireland.

=== Early bills ===
Legislation to allow for the recognition of same-sex marriages in Northern Ireland has been debated in the Assembly five times since 2012. On four of those occasions, only a minority of assembly members voted in favour of same-sex marriage, though the most recent vote on the issue in November 2015 saw a majority of MLAs vote in favour of same-sex marriage. On 27 April 2015, the Northern Ireland Assembly voted for the fourth time on the recognition of same-sex marriage. The motion for recognition was introduced by Sinn Féin and was defeated by a majority of 49 votes to 47; all Democratic Unionist (DUP) members in the Assembly voted against it, while all Sinn Féin, Green Party and NI21 members voted for it. On 2 November 2015, 105 MLAs voted on a motion to recognise same-sex marriage, with 53 voting in favour and 52 voting against, the first time same-sex marriage had received majority support in the Assembly. However, the Democratic Unionist Party tabled a petition of concern, preventing the motion from having any legal effect.

Sinn Féin said that legislation regarding same-sex marriage would be a priority for the party in the Assembly elected in May 2016. On 23 June 2016, Finance Minister Máirtín Ó Muilleoir announced he had requested that officials in the Northern Ireland Executive begin drafting legislation to allow same-sex marriage, stating that MLAs would much rather vote on the issue than "be forced to legislate [following] an adverse judgment" in the courts. In October 2016, First Minister Arlene Foster reaffirmed the DUP's opposition to same-sex marriage, saying the party would continue to issue a petition of concern blocking same-sex marriage in the Assembly over the next five years. The DUP won fewer than 30 seats at the March 2017 elections, meaning it lost the right to unilaterally block a bill using a petition of concern. Karen Bradley, the Secretary of State for Northern Ireland, stated in February 2018 that same-sex marriage could be legislated for in Northern Ireland by the UK Parliament, and that the government would likely allow a conscience vote for its MPs if such legislation was introduced. Labour MP Conor McGinn said he would introduce a private member's bill extending same-sex marriage to Northern Ireland by the end of March 2018.

The Marriage (Same Sex Couples) (Northern Ireland) Bill was introduced to the House of Commons on 28 March 2018, and passed its first reading. The bill's second reading in the Commons was blocked by a Conservative MP on three occasions in 2018. An identical bill was introduced to the House of Lords on 27 March by Baron Hayward, and passed its first reading that day. As both bills were private member's bills without government support, they failed to progress any further. In February 2019, Lord Hayward withdrew an amendment to an unrelated government bill, which if passed would have extended same-sex marriage to Northern Ireland, on opposition from government Lords. On 1 November 2018, royal assent was granted to the Northern Ireland (Executive Formation and Exercise of Functions) Act 2018, which contains sections describing Northern Ireland's same-sex marriage and abortion bans as human rights violations. The law did not legalise same-sex marriage in Northern Ireland, but directed the British Government to "issue guidance" to civil servants in Northern Ireland "in relation to the incompatibility of human rights with [the region's laws on the two issues]". The law passed 207–117 in the House of Commons.

=== Passage of legislation in 2019 ===
Map of constituencies showing how each of their MPs voted on the amendment extending same-sex marriage to Northern Ireland, 9 July 2019 Labour/Scottish National/Liberal Democrat/Change UK/Plaid Cymru/Green/Independent votes for: 278 (+2 tellers) Conservative votes for: 104 Conservative votes for both: 1 Conservative/Democratic Unionist votes against: 72 (+2 tellers) Absent/Non-voting/Abstentionist votes: 190 Seat vacant: 1

In July 2019, McGinn announced his intention to attach an amendment to an upcoming administrative bill relating to Northern Ireland, which would legalise same-sex marriage three months after passage of the bill if the Northern Ireland Assembly remained suspended. Under the terms of the originally-drafted amendment, the region's executive could approve or repeal the measure upon resumption. The amendment passed in the House of Commons with 383 votes in favour and 73 votes against. McGinn's amendment, which was further amended by Lord Hayward during passage in the House of Lords, required the Secretary of State to issue regulations extending same-sex marriage to Northern Ireland if the Assembly had not reconvened by 21 October 2019. If this occurred, then the regulations would come into effect on 13 January 2020. The bill passed its final stages in the Parliament and received royal assent on 24 July 2019, becoming the Northern Ireland (Executive Formation etc) Act 2019.

On 21 October 2019, 31 unionist MLAs signed a petition to reconvene the Northern Ireland Assembly to pass legislation to keep abortion illegal. The sitting was boycotted by Sinn Féin, the Alliance Party, the Green Party, and People Before Profit, and as a result the speaker, Robin Newton, ruled that the Assembly could not conduct business after an election unless a speaker could be elected on a cross-community vote. The sitting was therefore abandoned, and the Secretary of State for Northern Ireland, Julian Smith, stated in the House of Commons that the British Government would issue the regulations as obliged. The regulations came into effect on 13 January 2020, and the first legal same-sex wedding ceremony in Northern Ireland took place on 11 February 2020 between Robyn Peoples and Sharni Edwards-Peoples in Belfast.

=== Court cases ===
Two legal challenges to Northern Ireland's same-sex marriage ban were heard in the High Court in November and December 2015. Two couples, Grainne Close and Shannon Sickles and Chris and Henry Flanagan-Kanem, brought the case claiming that Northern Ireland's prohibition on same-sex marriage breached their human rights. The case was heard simultaneously with a case brought in January 2015 in which two men who wed in England sought to have their marriage recognised in Northern Ireland. A ruling was handed down in August 2017; Judge John Ailbe O'Hara found against the couples and determined that there were no grounds under case law from the European Court of Human Rights that the couples' rights were violated by Northern Ireland's refusal to recognise their union as a marriage. One of the couples involved in the litigation (who were granted anonymity) said they would appeal the ruling. The appeal was heard by a three-judge panel of the Court of Appeal on 16 March 2018; a ruling had been expected some time in 2019. On 7 April 2020, the Court of Appeal in Belfast ruled that same-sex couples faced unjustified discrimination while denied the opportunity to marry in Northern Ireland. But with changes to the law meaning same-sex weddings can take place in Northern Ireland since 11 February 2020, senior judges decided not to make a formal declaration on any human rights breach.

=== Public opinion ===
A September 2014 LucidTalk poll for the Belfast Telegraph showed that 40.1% of the population supported same-sex marriage, while 39.4% opposed and 20.5% either had or stated no opinion. Of those that gave an opinion, 50.5% supported and 49.5% opposed same-sex marriage. A poll in May 2015 found that 68% of the population supported same-sex marriage, with support rising to 75% in Belfast. A "mass rally", organised by the Irish Congress of Trade Unions, Amnesty International, and the Rainbow Project took place in Belfast on 13 June 2015, with a 20,000 person turnout. A June 2016 poll placed support for same-sex marriage at 70%, while those opposing it at 22%.

An April 2018 poll put support for same-sex marriage among Northern Ireland's population at 76%, while 18% were opposed.

== Royal same-sex weddings ==
In October and November 2021, several European governments, including those of Belgium, Luxembourg, the Netherlands, Norway and Sweden, confirmed that members of their respective royal families may marry partners of the same sex without having to forfeit the crown, or lose their royal titles and privileges or their place in the line of succession. The British Government has not commented on the matter, though royal experts have questioned whether the status of the king or queen as head of the Church of England, which currently does not allow same-sex marriages in its churches, would prevent an heir in a same-sex union from ascending the throne.

The first same-sex marriage for a member of the British royal family occurred on 22 September 2018 when Lord Ivar Mountbatten married his partner James Coyle at his private estate in Uffculme. Mountbatten is through his father, David Mountbatten, the great-great-great grandson of Queen Victoria and a first cousin, once removed of Prince Philip, Duke of Edinburgh. His ex-wife Penny Mountbatten walked him down the aisle. A second marriage occurred in February 2024 for Ellen Lascelles and her Australian partner Channtel McPherson in Byron Bay, Australia. Lascelles is the daughter of Jeremy Lascelles and a great-great-granddaughter of King George V.

== Marriage statistics ==
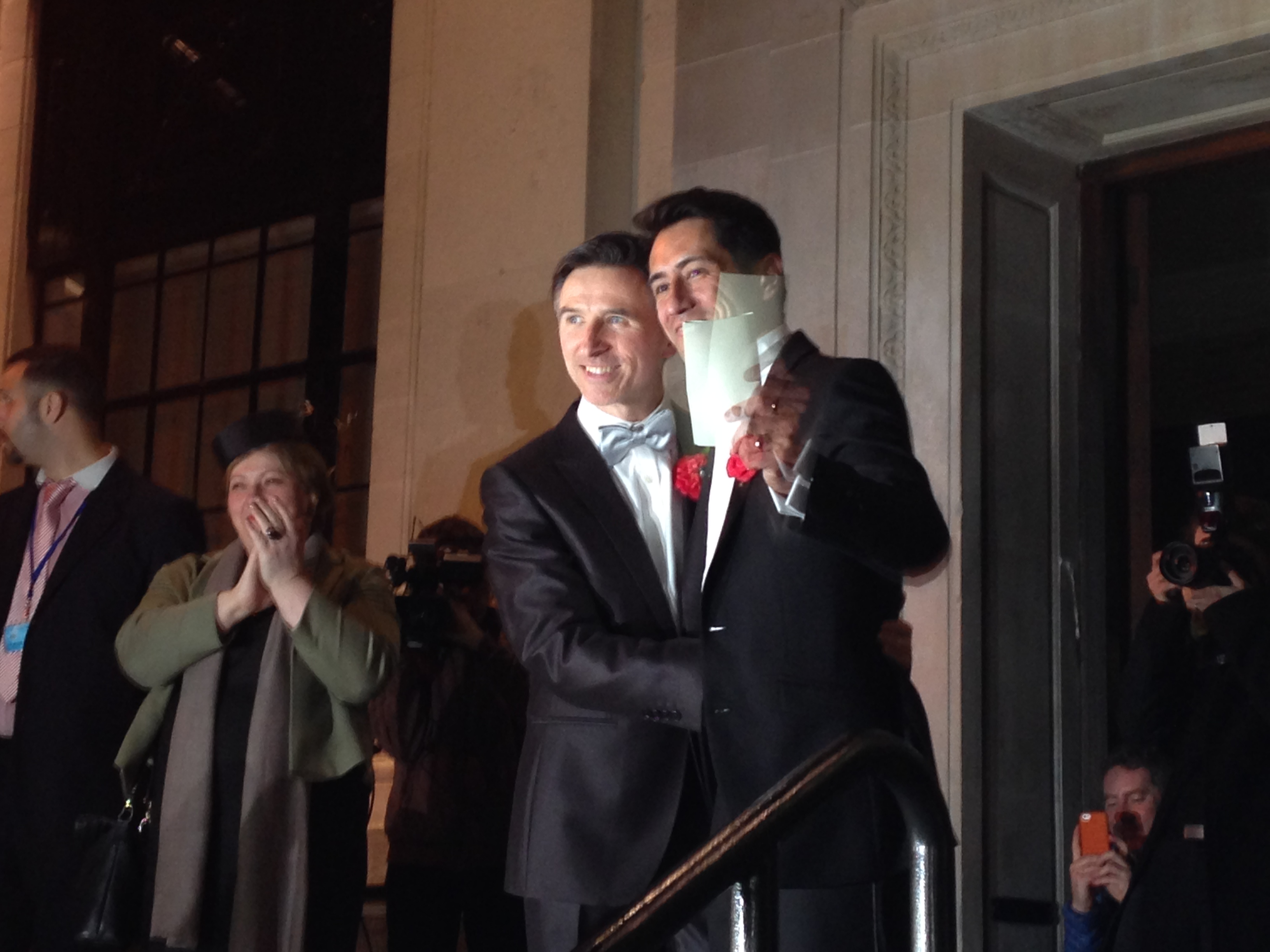
The first same-sex wedding in Islington, Greater London, 29 March 2014

1,409 same-sex marriages were performed between 29 March and 30 June 2014, with lesbian couples accounting for 56% of these marriages. By October 2015, approximately 15,000 same-sex marriages had been performed in England and Wales. Of these, 7,366 were new marriages, while 7,732 were conversions from civil partnerships. 55% of these marriages were between female couples and 45% were between male couples. During that same time period, the number of couples opting for civil partnerships fell significantly. In Cheshire for example, around 70 civil partnerships were recorded each year, but in 2015 only 4 partnerships were performed in the county.

462 same-sex marriages were performed in Scotland in the first five months of legalisation, accounting for 12% of all marriages performed during that time. Statistics published by the National Records of Scotland showed that 1,671 same-sex marriages took place in Scotland in 2015. Of these, 935 were conversions from civil partnerships and 736 were new marriages.

The following table shows the number of same-sex marriages performed in England and Wales since March 2014 according to the Office for National Statistics. The overwhelming majority of same-sex marriages are performed in civil ceremonies; there were 23 religious same-sex marriages in 2014, 44 in 2015, 61 in 2016, 43 in 2017 and 63 in 2018. In 2018, the average age of marriage for same-sex partners was 40.4 years for men and 36.9 years for women. Figures for 2020 are lower than previous years because of restrictions in place due to the COVID-19 pandemic.

Number of marriages performed in England and Wales
Year	Same-sex marriages			Conversions from partnerships	Opposite-sex marriages	Total marriages	% same-sex
Year	Female	Male	Total	Conversions from partnerships	Opposite-sex marriages	Total marriages	% same-sex
2014	2,721	2,129	4,850	2,411	247,372	252,222	1.92%
2015	3,633	2,860	6,493	9,156	239,020	245,513	2.64%
2016	3,910	3,109	7,019	1,663	242,774	249,793	2.81%
2017	3,884	3,048	6,932	1,072	235,910	242,842	2.85%
2018	3,959	2,966	6,925	803	227,870	234,795	2.95%
2019	3,861	2,867	6,728	578	213,122	219,850	3.06%
2020	1,609	1,202	2,811	238	82,959	85,770	3.28%
2021	3,766	2,289	6,055	352	201,653	207,708	2.92%
2022	4,896	2,904	7,800	388	239,097	246,897	3.16%
2023	4,485	3,016	7,501	319	216,901	224,402	3.34%

The 2021 United Kingdom census showed that there were 133,618 people in same-sex civil partnerships and 268,522 married same-sex spouses in England and Wales, with Brighton and Hove having the highest proportion of same-sex marriages of any city in England and Wales.

== Religious performance ==
=== Background ===
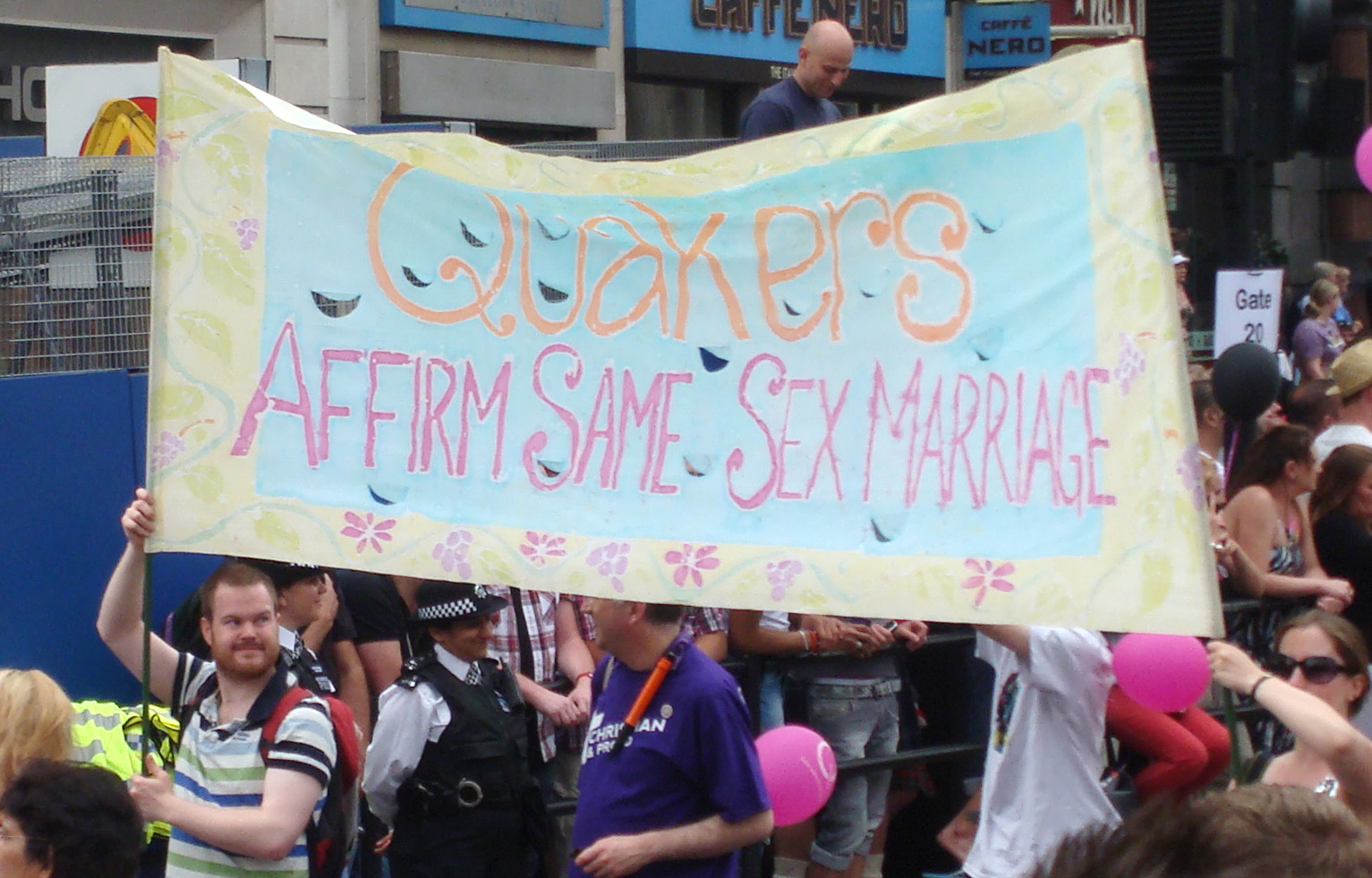
Quakers campaigning for same-sex marriage at Pride in London, 2011

Most major religious organisations in the United Kingdom do not perform same-sex marriages in their places of worship, though many offer blessings to same-sex couples. Some small Christian denominations such as the Dutch Church in London, Quakers and Unitarians solemnise same-sex marriages. In 2001, the Open Episcopal Church became the first in the United Kingdom to perform religious same-sex marriage ceremonies. Quakers formally expressed support for same-sex marriage in 2009. In May 2016, the Oasis Church Waterloo in London applied for a licence allowing it to conduct same-sex marriages. Pastor Steve Chalke said "Oasis Church in Waterloo has reached the decision. It's taken us some time to reach it, that this is something we want to do". As of 2026, 24 Baptist denominations have also registered to solemnise same-sex marriages. The first legally recognised religious same-sex wedding in the United Kingdom was solemnised by the Metropolitan Community Church in Pokesdown, Bournemouth on 12 April 2014.

In July 2016, the United Reformed Church voted overwhelmingly to allow its churches to perform same-sex marriages. The Church, with 60,000 members and 1,400 congregations, became the largest Christian denomination in the United Kingdom to offer same-sex marriages at that time. In June 2016, the Scottish Episcopal Church became the first British province in the Anglican Communion to take steps to allow same-sex marriages to be performed in its churches. The General Synod voted in favour of a motion to begin discussion amongst the seven dioceses to remove the doctrinal clause that marriage was "between a man and a woman". The vote received support from five of the seven bishops, 69% of the clergy and 80% of the laity. The General Synod formally approved the change to the doctrinal clause in June 2017, removing language stating that marriages could only be "between a man and a woman" and introducing a new conscience clause allowing clergy to opt out of performing same-sex weddings. On 20 July 2017, it was announced that a same-sex wedding was to be held at St Mary's Cathedral in Glasgow later in the summer. On 1 August 2017, a same-sex marriage, which included the Eucharist as a nuptial mass, was held at the Church of St John the Evangelist in Edinburgh. The Scottish Episcopal Church is estimated to have 100,000 members, and offers same-sex marriage to other Anglicans, including members of churches in England and the United States. In June 2021, the Methodist Church of Great Britain voted to permit same-sex marriage in its places of worship. The Methodist Conference voted 254 to 46 in favour of the move. A freedom of conscience clause allows ministers with objections to opt out of performing same-sex weddings. With about 164,000 members and 4,000 churches, the Methodist Church became the largest Christian denomination in the country to permit same-sex marriages at that time. Among the first couples to wed were Jason and Ben McMahon-Riley, who married at the Fulwood Methodist Church in Preston on 17 June 2021.

The Catholic Church opposes same-sex marriage and does not allow its priests to officiate at such marriages. In December 2023, the Holy See published Fiducia supplicans, a declaration allowing Catholic priests to bless couples who are not considered to be married according to church teaching, including the blessing of same-sex couples. The British Confraternity of Catholic Clergy released a statement on 21 December that the blessings outlined in Fiducia supplicans are "theologically, pastorally and practically inadmissible".

In addition, Liberal Judaism and the Movement for Reform Judaism perform same-sex marriages, and campaigned in favour of legalisation. Buddhist groups also perform same-sex marriages. In 2014, David Brazier of the Amida Trust, a Pure Land Buddhist denomination, performed a same-sex marriage in Malvern. In July 2017, Jahed Choudhury and Sean Rogan were married in Walsall adorning gold sherwanis, marking the "first same-sex Muslim wedding in the United Kingdom" according to The Independent. The first interfaith lesbian wedding occurred in Leicester in August 2017 for Kalavati Mistry and Miriam Jefferson, a Hindu-Jewish couple. Pagans also perform same-sex marriages. According to the Office for National Statistics, married same-sex spouses in 2021 were more likely to be Pagan, Buddhist or non-religious than married opposite-sex spouses, who were significantly more likely to be Christian, Muslim, Sikh or Hindu. There were no significant differences with regard to Jewish spouses.

=== Church of England ===
In January 2023, bishops of the Church of England refused to support a change to permit same-sex couples to marry in its churches. However, the bishops supported a "prayers of dedication, thanksgiving or for God's blessing" for same-sex couples following a civil marriage or partnership. The General Synod of the Church of England voted 250–181 to support the move in early February. The measure took effect on 17 December 2023. The Prayers of Love and Faith guidance allows clergy to bless same-sex couples within regular Sunday services; however, the blessings are not standalone, specialised services, and do not constitute marriage. Among the first couples to receive a blessing were Reverend Catherine Bond and Reverend Jane Pearce during Holy Eucharist on 17 December at St. John the Baptist Church in Felixstowe. Reverend Canon Andrew Dotchin, who offered the blessing, described the couple's relationship as a "pilgrimage graced by [God's] blessing". Archbishops Justin Welby and Stephen Cottrell said, "It has been a long road to get us to this point. For the first time, the [Church of England] will publicly, unreservedly and joyfully welcome same-sex couples in church. The [C]hurch continues to have deep differences on these questions which go to the heart of our human identity. As archbishops, we are committed to respecting the conscience of those for whom this goes too far and to ensure that they have all the reassurances they need in order to maintain the unity of the [C]hurch as this conversation continues." On 15 November, the General Synod voted by a one-vote majority to support standalone blessings for same-sex couples on a trial basis. However, in February 2026 the General Synod backtracked and halted any further work toward permitting married same-sex couples to receive specialised blessing services. In response, Archbishop Cottrell said: "This is not where I want us to be and not where we hoped we would be three years ago … I know that many of you are feeling angry and disappointed. There is a lot of pain and that pain cuts across so called 'party lines' or theological convictions held." The Synod set up a new working group on "relationships, sexuality and gender" for "continuing work" on the issue.

Religious same-sex marriage ceremonies in the Church of England are supported by some clergy, including the Bishop of Oxford, Steven Croft, and the Bishop of Reading, Olivia Graham. In March 2023, Labour MP Ben Bradshaw introduced a bill to Parliament to "allow, in certain circumstances, priests and parishes [of the Church of England] that wish to conduct same-sex weddings to do so". A 2023 survey conducted by The Times showed that 53% of priests in the Church of England supported religious same-sex marriage ceremonies in church.

=== Church of Scotland ===
In May 2018, the Church of Scotland voted to draft new laws that would allow ministers to conduct same-sex marriages. The motion was passed by the General Assembly by a vote of 345 to 170. The legal questions committee had two years to draft legislation. In May 2021, the General Assembly voted 319–217 to approve the draft legislation. The law includes safeguards for ministers opposed to performing same-sex marriages. The presbyteries voted 29–12 in support of the legislation in April, and the General Assembly gave its final approval on 23 May 2022 by 274 votes to 136. Reverend Scott Rennie, the Minister of Queen's Cross Church in Aberdeen, welcomed the move, saying, "My marriage to my husband, Dave, nurtures my life and my ministry, and frankly I do not think I could be a minister of this church without his love and support. It is always there in the background. Same-sex marriage is like opposite-sex marriage and it has its joys and sorrows, its glories and its tensions. It's pretty normal, really." The vote made the Church of Scotland the largest church in the United Kingdom to allow same-sex marriages.

=== Church in Wales ===
In September 2021, the Church in Wales voted to bless same-sex marriages on a trial basis. The move was supported unanimously by the bishops, while the clergy voted 28 to 12 in favor with two abstentions, and the laity voted 49 to 10 with one abstention. Gregory Cameron, the Bishop of St Asaph, said the decision was a "huge step forward for the [C]hurch and for us all in Wales". The measure includes a conscience clause, allowing individual clergy to decide whether or not to offer the blessings. Cameron performed the first blessing on 13 November 2021 for Father Lee Taylor, the Vicar of Llangollen, and his partner Fabiano Da Silva Duarte. In April 2026, the Church voted overwhelmingly in favor of a motion—lay members voting 48–8 in favor, the clergy voting 32–7, and the bishops voting 6–0—to make the blessing service permanent. This means that the wording introduced in 2021 would now be added to the Book of Common Prayer (Welsh: Llyfr Gweddi Gyffredin), which includes the standard form for the Church in Wales' common prayers and blessings.

In September 2026, the Church announced it would delay plans officially allowing clergy to conduct same-sex marriage ceremonies; "This significant decision has been reached following a period of positive but yet frank interaction and the bishops believe that a longer period of time is now needed to assess the best way forward in enabling Governing Body to consider equal marriage," the Bench of Bishops said in a statement.

== Consular marriages ==
Following the Consular Marriage and Marriages under Foreign Law Order 2014, "a consular marriage may take place in those countries or territories outside the United Kingdom which have notified the Secretary of State in writing that there is no objection to such marriages taking place in that country or territory and which have not subsequently revoked that notice". Same-sex consular marriages are possible in 26 countries: Australia, Azerbaijan, Bolivia, Cambodia, Chile, China (including Hong Kong), Colombia, Costa Rica, the Dominican Republic, Estonia, Germany, Hungary, Japan, Kosovo, Latvia, Lithuania, Mongolia, Montenegro, Nicaragua, Peru, the Philippines, Russia, San Marino, Serbia, Seychelles and Vietnam.

240 consular same-sex marriages were performed between June 2014 and the end of December 2015. An additional 140 couples converted their civil partnerships into marriages. Consular marriages for same-sex couples were particularly popular in Australia prior to the country's legalisation of same-sex marriage in 2017. 445 couples had married in British consulates across Australia by October 2017.

== Crown Dependencies and Overseas Territories ==
Same-sex marriage is legal and performed in the three Crown Dependencies of Britain and in eight of the fourteen Overseas Territories.

=== Crown Dependencies ===
- Guernsey – In December 2015, the States of Guernsey approved a motion to legislate for the recognition of same-sex marriage. The Same-Sex Marriage (Guernsey) Law, 2016 was approved by the States in September 2016 by a vote of 33–5, and gained royal assent on 14 December 2016. The law went into effect on 2 May 2017. The legislation does not extend to Guernsey's dependencies, Alderney and Sark.
  - Alderney – A bill to allow same-sex marriage was approved 9–0 by the States of Alderney on 18 October 2017, and received royal assent on 13 December 2017. It came into effect on 14 June 2018.
  - Sark – On 17 December 2019, the Chief Pleas approved legislation mirroring the provisions of Guernsey's same-sex marriage law. The bill received royal assent in the Privy Council on 11 March 2020, and came into effect on 23 April 2020.
- Isle of Man – Legislation recognising same-sex marriage was approved 17–3 by the House of Keys on 8 March 2016, and 6–3 by the Legislative Council on 26 April. The legislation was granted royal assent on 13 July and went into effect on 22 July 2016.
- Jersey – A motion to introduce legislation regarding same-sex marriage was approved by the States Assembly in September 2015. A same-sex marriage bill was eventually debated by the States on 1 February 2018, where it passed by a vote of 42–1. It received royal assent on 23 May and went into effect on 1 July 2018.

=== Overseas Territories ===
Of the fourteen British Overseas Territories, same-sex marriage is allowed in eight: Akrotiri and Dhekelia, the British Antarctic Territory, the British Indian Ocean Territory, the Falkland Islands, Gibraltar, the Pitcairn Islands, Saint Helena, Ascension and Tristan da Cunha and South Georgia and the South Sandwich Islands.

- Akrotiri and Dhekelia – Same-sex marriage has been recognised and performed in the Sovereign Base Areas since 3 June 2014, for UK military personnel only. The first same-sex marriage was conducted in Dhekelia on 10 September 2016. Civil partnerships have also been allowed for military personnel since 7 December 2005.
- Bermuda – On 5 May 2017, the Bermuda Supreme Court ruled in favour of same-sex marriage, allowing several same-sex couples to marry in Bermuda over the following months. However, the Bermuda Parliament passed a law in December 2017 to replace same-sex marriages with domestic partnerships. The law went into effect on 1 June 2018. On 6 June, the Supreme Court revoked the parts of the law that banned same-sex marriages, but the decision was stayed pending appeal, which the government lost on 23 November 2018. On 14 March 2022, the Judicial Committee of the Privy Council upheld the government's appeal, ending the right to same-sex marriage in Bermuda.
- British Antarctic Territory – A same-sex marriage ordinance has been in force since 13 October 2016.
- British Indian Ocean Territory – A same-sex marriage ordinance has been in force since 3 June 2014. Civil partnerships have also been allowed for military personnel since 7 December 2005.
- Cayman Islands – Same-sex civil partnerships are legal following the enactment of a partnership law by Governor Martyn Roper on 4 September 2020. A lawsuit filed by a same-sex couple seeking access to same-sex marriage was rejected by the Privy Council on 14 March 2022.
- Falkland Islands – On 30 March 2017, the Legislative Assembly of the Falkland Islands approved a bill legalising same-sex marriage by a vote of 7 to 1. It received royal assent on 13 April and went into effect on 29 April 2017.
- Gibraltar – On 26 October 2016, the Civil Marriage Amendment Act 2016 was passed in the Gibraltar Parliament with unanimous support from all 15 members present during the vote. It received royal assent on 1 November and took effect on 15 December 2016.
- Pitcairn Islands – An ordinance to legalise same-sex marriage was approved 7–0 by the Island Council on 1 April 2015, and signed by Governor Jonathan Sinclair on 5 May. It was published on 13 May 2015 and took effect the next day.
- Saint Helena, Ascension and Tristan da Cunha – Same-sex marriage is legislated for throughout the territory:
  - Ascension Island – A same-sex marriage ordinance was approved unanimously by all five present members of the Ascension Island Council on 31 May 2016. It was signed by Governor Lisa Honan and published in the official gazette on 20 June. On 23 December 2016, Honan issued an order to commence the law on 1 January 2017.
  - Tristan da Cunha – An ordinance extending the Ascension Island same-sex marriage law to Tristan da Cunha was issued on 4 August 2017.
  - Saint Helena – The Legislative Council of Saint Helena passed a same-sex marriage bill 9–2 on 19 December 2017. It was given royal assent the next day.
- South Georgia and the South Sandwich Islands – Same-sex marriage has been legal in the territory since 2014.
- Same-sex marriage and civil partnerships are not performed or recognised in Anguilla, the British Virgin Islands, Montserrat and the Turks and Caicos Islands.

In July 2022, Michael Cashman introduced legislation to the House of Lords to legalise same-sex marriage in the remaining six British Overseas Territories. The bill would "empower the Governor of each Territory to make changes to the law in the Territory to recognize the lawfulness of same-sex marriage and allow for the solemnization of marriage of same-sex couples." It had its first reading in the House of Lords on 6 July. Governor Roper said the measure had "little chance of progressing". This was not the first attempt to extend same-sex marriage rights to all British Overseas Territories; in February 2019, a Foreign Affairs Select Committee report recommended extending same-sex marriage to all territories with an Order in Council. At the time, the Leader of the Opposition in the Turks and Caicos Islands, Washington Misick, had accused the British Government of trying to "neutralise the authority" of the Caribbean territories. MP Chris Bryant accused territories of wanting to "have their cake and eat it": "You want to be under the British umbrella, but you do not want to be part of the British way of life."

== See also ==
- LGBTQ rights in the United Kingdom
- Same-sex marriage in Scotland
- Same-sex marriage in Northern Ireland
- Same-sex marriage in Guernsey
- Same-sex marriage in the Isle of Man
- Same-sex marriage in Jersey
- Recognition of same-sex unions in the British Overseas Territories
- Recognition of same-sex unions in Europe
- He never married
