= PinkNews =

UK-based online newspaper focused on LGBTQ+ topics

- PinkNews homepage, April 2012
- Website type: Online newspaper
- Available in: English
- Headquarters: United Kingdom
- Creator: Benjamin Cohen
- Website: thepinknews.com
- Commercial: Yes
- Registration: No
- Launched: July 2005
- Current status: Active

PinkNews is a UK-based online newspaper marketed to the LGBTQ+ community covering both domestic and international news. It was founded by Benjamin Cohen in July 2005, initially released in print, but became an online version six months later.

The paper closely follows political progress on LGBTQ+ rights around the world, and carries interviews with cultural figures and politicians, on topics such as same-sex marriage in the United Kingdom, and has participated in campaigns such as Out4Marriage.

== History ==
=== PinkUnlimited.co.uk ===
PinkNews was founded by Benjamin Cohen in July 2005. PinkUnlimited.co.uk Ltd was registered at Companies House on 13 December 2005. That month the sitting Prime Minister, Tony Blair, wrote their online article: We are living in a new age of equality. The PinkNews paper version was officially launched in 2006. However, PinkNews became an online-only publication when the print edition was dropped after six months.

=== PinkNews Media ===
In April 2015, the company was renamed PinkNews Media Group Ltd. In 2018, PinkNews became the first LGBTQ+ publisher on Snapchat. It made an operating profit of £2 million in 2021. The website was redesigned in 2022. New filtering features were also added to its app in an attempt to counter news avoidance due to negative reporting.

In November 2020, the company was renamed PinkNews Media Ltd.

== Notable mentions ==
=== Premiership footballers ===
In 2006, two tabloid newspapers, the News of the World and The Sun, published false allegations about two unnamed Premiership footballers having a gay orgy with a DJ, using a pixelated photograph of footballer Ashley Cole to illustrate the story. PinkNews published what it claimed to be the unpixelated original photograph. Cole, along with the DJ, Masterstepz, sued the tabloids' parent company News International and won at least £100,000 plus legal costs.

=== Stonewall ===
PinkNews reported heavily on the refusal of Stonewall, an LGBTQ+ rights group, to actively campaign for gay marriage prior to October 2010. A poll commissioned by PinkNews and answered by more than 800 of their readership found 98% in support of marriage equality. Stonewall was also criticised by a former founder, Michael Cashman, MEP in an op-ed for PinkNews entitled "What part of 'equality' can't Stonewall understand?" Stonewall CEO, Ben Summerskill later accused PinkNews of running an "unethical campaign" against Stonewall after asking every LGBT organisation and political group to outline their stance on the issue, with only Stonewall refusing to comment. In October 2010, Stonewall revised its policy and agreed to support same-sex marriage. On 25 April 2012 PinkNews began using a video for the Coalition for Equal Marriage in their advertising space, wrote articles in support of it and gave it their official backing, encouraging readers to respond to the government consultation to show their opinions.

PinkNews regularly reported on the progress of the Out4Marriage campaign, which was started in May 2012 and launched by Mike Buonaiuto and PinkNews founder, Benjamin Cohen. The campaign used YouTube videos of people supporting equal marriage, including celebrities and Members of Parliament, finishing with the line "And that's why I'm out for marriage. Are you?". The Out4Marriage YouTube campaign reached 14 million views in just three weeks from launch. PinkNews was an official supporter of the Coalition for Equal Marriage (C4EM), a counter-organisation to the Coalition for Marriage, and successfully petitioned for the introduction of same-sex marriage rights in England and Wales, while the Coalition for Marriage campaigned against it.

PinkNews began to collaborate closely with Stonewall following the departure of Summerskill in 2014. PinkNews had regularly reported criticism of Stonewall for its refusal to campaign on transgender issues. A year later, under Chief Executive Ruth Hunt, Stonewall decided to begin campaigning on transgender issues. Hunt has written for PinkNews on a number of occasions.

In 2017, Stonewall and PinkNews co-hosted an election hustings.

=== Peter Tatchell Day ===
In 2012 PinkNews named 25 January as Peter Tatchell Day to celebrate the British political campaigner's 60th birthday, 45 years of human rights campaigning and 10 years since the launch of the Peter Tatchell Foundation. PinkNews also published a prose poem written by Stephen Fry in honour of Tatchell's birthday on 24 January and frequently carries advertisements for the Peter Tatchell Foundation.

=== Interview with the Archbishop of Canterbury ===
PinkNews became one of the few LGBTQ+ publications to have interviewed an incumbent Archbishop of Canterbury in 2014, when Justin Welby discussed the Church of England's approach to homosexuality.

=== Layla Moran ===
On 2 January 2020, UK MP Layla Moran said in an interview with PinkNews that she is pansexual; she is believed to be the first UK parliamentarian to come out as pansexual.

== See also ==
- LGBTQ+ culture
- LGBTQ+ rights in the United Kingdom
- List of LGBTQ+ periodicals
- The Pink Paper
