= Coalition for Equal Marriage =

2012 campaign group for same-sex marriage in the UK

- Founded: 2012 (14 years ago)
- Type: Campaign organisation
- Purpose: Support same-sex marriage
- Region served: United Kingdom
- Key people: Conor Marron; James Lattimore

The Coalition for Equal Marriage is a British campaign group created in 2012 by Conor Marron and James Lattimore, a same-sex couple, to petition in support of civil marriages for gay couples. The Coalition for Equal Marriage was created in response to the Coalition for Marriage, a Christian group campaigning against same-sex marriage in the United Kingdom.

The coalition's website states the campaign started after Lattimore read a BBC News article regarding the Coalition for Marriage and seeing a comment from Lord Carey stating "The avowed intention to widen the scope of marriage as we see before us is a hostile strike, which rather than strengthening marriage, will destroy its meaning and diminish its importance drastically". Lattimore and his partner began working on the site and mimicked the look and design of the Coalition for Marriage website as a spoof, with Facebook and Twitter campaigns launched a day later. Signatures reached 10,000 roughly ten days afterwards and 40,000 signatures in April 2012.

== Signing of Nick Clegg ==
Deputy Prime Minister Nick Clegg has signed the Coalition for Equal Marriage petition, and in an interview for The Independent Clegg was reported to have called it "a matter of how, not whether, equal marriage becomes legal in England and Wales."

Conor Marron, co-founder of the Coalition for Equal Marriage, released a statement thanking Nick Clegg and the MPs "who have voiced their position on the subject".

== Sponsors ==
The Coalition for Equal Marriage is sponsored by many organisations, including LGBT organisations, anti-bullying groups, charities, political parties, human rights groups and activists, religions and religious groups, community groups, and also media companies.

=== Secular and humanist organisations ===
- British Humanist Association
- The Gay & Lesbian Humanist Association
- Humanist & Secularist Liberal Democrats
- National Secular Society
- Pink Triangle Trust
- Rationalist Association

=== LGBT and human rights organisations ===
- Consortium
- LAGLA – Lesbian and Gay Lawyers
- NUSLGBT
- Peter Tatchell Foundation
- The Rainbow Project
- Scottish Transgender Alliance
- Stonewall
- T-Form

=== University and community groups ===
- GRIN
- LGBT Union
- Metro
- NUSScotlandLGBT
- Proud Voices
- Pink Singers
- Space Youth Project

=== Political groups ===
- LGBT Labour
- LGBT+ Liberal Democrats
- LGBTIQ Green Party
- LGBTory
- Liberal Youth Scotland

=== Media ===
- Attitude magazine
- Bi Community News magazine
- Gay Times magazine
- Gaydar
- Gaydar Radio radio station
- Gaydio radio station
- PinkNews online newspaper
- Polari Magazine
- The Pod Delusion
- So So Gay

=== Religious organisations ===
- KeshetUK
- Lesbian Gay Christians
- Liberal Judaism (United Kingdom)
- MCC – Metropolitan Community Church of North London
- Neo-Druidism
- OneSpirit Interfaith Organization
- Sarbat.net, an LGBT Sikh organisation
- Wicca

== Advertising ==
Mike Buonaiuto created a viral advertisement on behalf of C4EM for release in late April 2012, with a teaser available before. The teaser features stills from the advert to the speech of David Cameron at the Conservative Party conference in 2011, when he announced "I don't support gay marriage in spite of being a Conservative. I support gay marriage because I am a Conservative."

On 25 April 2012, Buonaiuto's short film was released encouraging support for the government plans to legislate in favour of equal civil marriage rights for LGBT people. The video shows British army members returning home to their families, with one reunion turning into a marriage proposal between a same-sex couple. The argument put forth in the video and by Buonaiuto directly is that if gay and straight people can fight in the army together, then they should be able to love and get married the same. Supporting parties, gave their backing to the short film, while PinkNews advertised it directly on their website. The full advertisement reached 500,000 views in less than one week.

== See also ==
- Civil partnership in the United Kingdom
- Same-sex marriage in the United Kingdom
