= Out4Marriage =

Political campaign

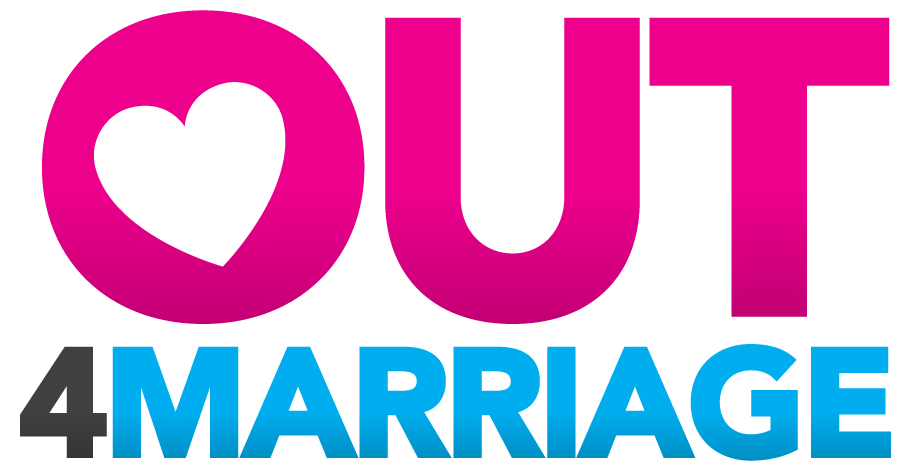
- Out4Marriage logo
- Founded: 9 May 2012
- Founders: Benjamin Cohen and Mike Buonaiuto (retired)
- Location: United Kingdom
- Region served: Worldwide
- Key people: Benjamin Cohen, James-J Walsh
- Employees: 0
- Volunteers: 10
- Website: http://www.Out4Marriage.org/

Out4Marriage is a political campaign that was started on 8 May 2012 in response to the British Government's consultation concerning the legalisation of same-sex marriage in England and Wales. It centres on YouTube—and other social media—videos in which those filmed give their views on why they support marriage for same-sex individuals, with each video finishing with the tagline "And that's why I'm out for marriage. Are you?". Creators of the videos have included members of the public, Members of Parliament, peers and celebrities.

Its goal is to raise awareness about the issue of equal marriage and to provide a voice for the people who support it. Out4Marriage is modelled on the It Gets Better YouTube project, launched by US LGBT activist Dan Savage, where politicians, celebrities and members of the public gave hope to teenagers coming to terms with their sexuality.

== Campaign background and history ==
The British Government's consultation on equal marriage was started on 15 March 2012, prompting the launch of a Christian campaign group called the Coalition for Marriage (C4M). The website for C4M states that they are "an umbrella group of individuals and organisations in the UK that support traditional marriage and oppose any plans to redefine it.".

As part of the British Government's consultations on the introduction of same-sex marriage in the UK, Out4Marriage's Directors of Campaigns James-J Walsh assisted by Joseph Musgrove, a volunteer who went on to work for the Conservative equal marriage campaign wrote the official submission document calling for legislation to allow same-sex religious marriage, enhanced spousal pension rights, and courtesy titles for peers.

The Out4Marriage website states that the campaign was conceived by Buonaiuto and Pink News founder, Benjamin Cohen, however since the initial video Buonaiuto moved away to other projects. The website also posits that a “global team of volunteers are helping to recruit new video makers, moderate submissions and engage with politicians”. In the first week, the Out4Marriage campaign received considerable press coverage.

=== Home coming ===
Prior to the Out4Marriage campaign launching, a short-film was created called Homecoming, depicting the proposal of a gay soldier to his partner, upon returning home from war. The film received 700,000 YouTube views in its first week online. In a BBC World News interview on 11 May 2012, Buonaiuto explained that Homecoming was what had inspired Out4Marriage. He went on to say that those working on the campaign were all volunteers and that no money had been spent on the project.

== LobbyALord ==
In the run up to the Lords debate in the wake of Lord Dear proposing effectively a deletion amendment, James-J Walsh led on the campaigning activity to engage the House of Lords, he designed the very first platform for being able to digitally engage Peers within the House of Lords. As part of this Walsh recruited Chris Ward, a web developer, to build an online peers lobbying site that enabled ordinary people to connect with often unaccountable Lords and Baronesses.

The Site www.LobbyALord.org was receiving traffic resulting at peeks an email being sent to a peer every 8 seconds in the 72 hours before the debate, after endorsements by Grindr a gay mobile dating app, who issued a message to 1 million of its members, and Stephen Fry via his Twitter account.

== Notable contributions ==
Within the first three weeks after the campaign was launched, videos were uploaded to the Out4Marriage YouTube account from public figures such as Richard Branson, UK pop girl band The Saturdays and human rights campaigner, Peter Tatchell.

Many Members of Parliament also recorded videos for the campaign, including the then Home Secretary, Theresa May; former Equalities minister Lynne Featherstone and former cabinet minister, Jack Straw.

== List of contributions from public figures and personalities ==
- Nick Clegg, former deputy prime minister (2010–2015) and former leader of the Liberal Democrats
- Ed Miliband, former leader of the Labour Party (2010–2015)
- Theresa May, former home secretary and Minister for Women and Equalities, former prime minister (2016–2019)
- William Bain, former shadow minister for Scotland
- Tom Blenkinsop, former Labour MP for Middlesbrough South and East Cleveland (2010–2017)
- Crispin Blunt, Conservative MP for Reigate since 1997
- Michael Cashman, former Labour MEP for West Midlands
- Yvette Cooper, former shadow home secretary and Labour MP for Normaton since 2001
- Lynne Featherstone, former Parliamentary Under-Secretary for Equalities and former Liberal Democrat MP for Hornsey and Wood Green (2005–2015)
- Stephen Gilbert, former Liberal Democrat MP for St Austell and Newquay (2005–2015)
- Beverley Knight, singer
- Caroline Lucas, former leader of the Green Party of England and Wales and MP for Brighton Pavilion since 2010
- Fiona MacTaggart, former Labour MP for Slough (1997–2017)
- The Saturdays, UK pop group
- Dan Savage, US author and creator of the It Gets Better Project
- Chris Smith, former Secretary of State for Culture, Media, Sport
- Jack Straw, former MP for Blackburn, former cabinet minister
- Sir Desmond Swayne, former Parliamentary Private Secretary to the Prime Minister
- Boris Johnson, former mayor of London (2008–2016) and former prime minister (2019–2022)
- Anna Soubry, former MP for Broxtowe (2010–2019), former government minister and former leader of Change UK (2019)
- Danny Alexander, former Labour Member of Parliament and former chief secretary to the Treasury
- Justine Greening, former Conservative MP for Putney (2005–2019) and the first openly lesbian secretary of state
- David Mundell, Conservative MP for Clydesdale and Teesadle since 2005 and the first openly gay secretary of state
- Maria Eagle, Labour MP for Wallasey since 2005
- Maria Miller, former culture secretary and Conservative MP for Basingstoke since 2005.
- Helen Grant, former minister for women and equalities and Conservative MP for Maidstone and The Weald since 2010
- Jo Johnson, brother of Boris Johnson and Conservative MP for Orpington (2010–2019)
- Zac Goldsmith, Conservative MP for Richmond Park (2010–2016) and (2017–2019, Member of the House of Lords since 2020
- Nick Herbert, former Conservative MP for Arundel & South Downs (2005–2019), former minister and former chairman of the All Party Parliamentary Group on LGBT+ rights
- William Bane, former Labour MP and Shadow Minister for Scotland
- Jo Swinson, former leader of the Liberal Democrats (2019) and MP for East Dunbartonshire (2005–2015) and (2017–2019)
- Sir Edward Davey, Liberal Democrat MP for Kingston and Surbiton (1997–2015) and (2017–) Leader of the Liberal Democrats since 2020
- Simon Kirby, former Conservative MP for Brighton Kemptown (2010–2017)
- Julian Huppert, former Liberal Democrat MP for Cambridge (2005–2015)
- Steve Williams, former Liberal Democrat MP for Bristol West, (2005–2015)
- Mike Freer, Conservative MP for Finchley and Golders Green since 2010
- Chris Williamson, former Labour MP for Derby South (2010–2015) and 2017–19. He was expelled from Labour in 2018, readmitted, then expelled in 2019
- Tom Brake, former Liberal Democrat MP for Carshalton & Wellington (1997–2019)
- Geraint Davies, Labour MP for Swansea West since 2010
- Mike Gapes, former Labour MP for Ilford South (1997–2019), former Member of Change UK (2019).
- Kelvin Hopkins, former Labour MP for Luton South (1997–2019). He was expelled from Labour in 2017.
- David Lammy, Labour Member of Parliament for Tottenham since 2000
- Baroness King, Labour Member of the House of Lords
- Chris Smith, Labour Member of the House of Lords
- Brian Paddick, Liberal Democrat Member of the House of Lords
- Michael Cashman, former Labour Member of European Parliament
- Andrew Boff, Conservative Member of the London Assembly since 2008
- Sarah Wollaston, former Liberal Democrat MP for Totnes (2010–2019)
- Chuka Umunna, former Liberal Democrat MP for Streatham (2010–2019)
- Sam Gyimah, former Liberal Democrat MP for East Surrey (2010–2019)
- Luciana Berger, former Liberal Democrat MP for Liverpool Wavertree (2010–2019)
- Chris Leslie, former Labour MP for Shipley (1997-2005) and Nottingham South (2010–2019), former shadow chancellor and Deputy Leader of Change UK (2019).
- Nick Gibb, Conservative MP for Bognor Regis since 1997 and Conservative Minister
- Simon Hughes, former Liberal Democrat MP for Bermondsey and Old Southwark (1997–2015)
- Stephen Hammond, Conservative MP for Wimbledon since 2005
- Peter Tatchell, Campaigner for Human Rights
- Alan Wilson (bishop), Bishop of Buckingham
- Hugh Grant, actor
- Simon Callow, actor
- Stephen Fry, comedian, author, broadcaster, actor and director
- Sinitta, singer
- Paloma Faith, singer
- Peter Tatchell, Human Rights Campaigner
- Jeffrey John, Dean of St Albans
- David Mitchell, rabbi
- Canon Rosie Harper, religious leader
- Richard Branson, chairman of Virgin Group
- Ian McKellen, actor
- Piers Morgan, TV presenter
