= Benjamin Cohen (journalist) =

British journalist

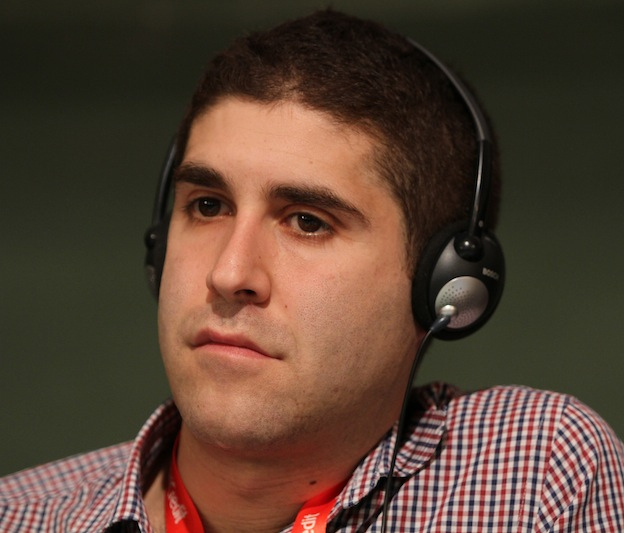
- Cohen in 2013
- Born: 14 August 1982 (age 43)
- Occupations: Journalist, Entrepreneur, Web Developer
- Years active: 1998–present
- Known for: Founding PinkNews, legal dispute with Apple, Out4Marriage campaign
- Notable work: PinkNews, Out4Marriage
- Spouse: Anthony James (m. 2018)

Benjamin Cohen (born 14 August 1982) is a British web developer, entrepreneur and online publisher. He became known for his internet enterprises as a teenager and his dispute with Apple over the domain "itunes.co.uk", and as the founder of the PinkNews website. From 2006 until 2012 he was technology correspondent for Channel 4 News in the UK. Cohen has a diagnosis of MS. He campaigns on gay and disabled rights. He is the chief executive of PinkNews, and regularly writes for the London Evening Standard.

== Early life ==
Cohen attended JFS.

In 1998, at the age of 16, Cohen founded the website JewishNet.co.uk, an early social networking community which later became SoJewish.com, with £150 and floated it on the Alternative Investment Market (AIM) ten months later. The company controlling the website, which Cohen had a 10–15% stake in, along with investors, was valued at £5 million in September 1998. The Daily Telegraph reported that he exchanged his stake in this company to AIM-quoted Totally plc for £310,000 in an all-share deal; yet when Cohen later sold half of his stake, these shares were worth just £40,000.

== Business life ==
Cohen received media attention because of a legal dispute with Apple over the domain name iTunes.co.uk. In November 2000, two weeks after Apple lodged its UK trademark application for the term 'iTunes', Cohen's company CyberBritain Group registered the iTunes.co.uk domain name and redirected it to a music search engine. Cohen's company's actions were considered to be "abusive" by the independent expert appointed by the arbiter Nominet and his company was required to transfer the domain name to Apple. In 2001, Cohen was involved with a search engine for internet pornography (hunt4porn.com) which formed part of his CyberBritain.com internet portal. Cohen was reported as stating that CyberBritain company revenue was £12,000 per month at this time. The company filed a Companies House return showing a total yearly profit of £165 up to 31 March 2001.

In his 2001 book Dot.Bomb, Rory Cellan-Jones wrote: "Whatever you may think of Benjamin Cohen, you have to admire his ability to manipulate the media. The increasingly outlandish values put on his flimsy company merely reflected the mood of the time. But then some of the bigger dot.coms, which managed to sell shares based on even more outlandish valuations, were to prove equally flimsy".

His Channel 4 News profile describes him as having been the youngest-ever director of a public company. In 2006 he joined Channel 4 News as a technology correspondent at the age of 23, the youngest correspondent to have been appointed in the programme's history. He produced investigations during his time at Channel 4 News, including an award-winning exposé of security flaws in contactless credit card use.

Cohen writes for PinkNews regularly, which he created in 2005. Between 2004 and 2006, Cohen wrote a column on e-business for The Times under the heading "dot.com millionaire".

== Charitable work ==
Cohen was diagnosed with multiple sclerosis shortly after joining Channel 4 News. In 2010, he joined the board of trustees of the UK branch of Handicap International. He is also a trustee of the LGBTQ arts charity Wise Thoughts, and joined an "it gets better" campaign.

In May 2012, Cohen founded the Out4Marriage campaign for marriage equality in the United Kingdom which features politicians, religious leaders, and celebrities explaining on YouTube videos why they support changing the law to allow gay couples to marry.

== Personal life ==
Cohen is gay and Jewish and has been married to Anthony James, a General Practitioner, since 2018.
