= Coalition for Marriage =

Christian organization against same-sex marriage in the UK

- Founded: 2012
- Type: Campaign organisation
- Region served: United Kingdom
- Website: c4m.org.uk

The Coalition for Marriage, often abbreviated to C4M, is a Christian campaign group in the United Kingdom that opposes same-sex marriage. Founded in February 2012, the Coalition for Marriage is the main campaign group against same-sex marriage in the United Kingdom.

== History ==
=== Founding ===
The Christian Institute, an evangelical Christian advocacy group, announced the formation of C4M on 20 February 2012. Its mission was to rally opposition to legalizing same-sex marriage. Its principal initiative was a petition against allowing civil marriage for same-sex couples. Lord Carey, the former Archbishop of Canterbury, endorsed its efforts.

The Coalition for Marriage is a not-for-profit public limited company whose directors have links to high-profile conservative Christian groups. C4M director Colin Hart is director of the Christian Institute. C4M director Nola Leach is head of the pro-life organization Christian Action Research and Education (CARE). C4M director Donald Horrocks is the head of public affairs for the Evangelical Alliance. C4M director Andrea Minichiello Williams, a barrister, is a founder of pressure group Christian Concern and CEO of the Christian Legal Centre.

The coalition also shares the same address as the Christian Medical Fellowship, a pro-life group.

=== Petition campaign ===
C4M's petition campaign has gathered over 650,000 signatures. Some notable public figures, including politicians from the Conservative and Labour parties, lawyers, academics and religious leaders, have signed, including Lord Chancellor Lord Mackay of Clashfern, Professor Brenda Almond, President of the Philosophical Society of England, and Fiona Bruce MP, all of whose participation was announced as part of the launch of the petition drive. The petition says: "I support the legal definition of marriage which is the voluntary union for life of one man and one woman to the exclusion of all others. I oppose any attempt to redefine it."

==== Criticism of the petition campaign ====
In March 2012, the Women's Institute declined to carry C4M's advertising on behalf of its petition campaign in its magazine, WI Life, which is delivered to its 210,000 members. Its advertising manager Helen Evans wrote to C4M that "We are a national campaigning charity and your campaign doesn't fit with any of our resolutions first and foremost. ... We do also welcome all women to the WI and this campaign could offend many of our members."

On 8 April 2012, the LGBT news service, Pink News, claimed the Coalition for Marriage's petition allowed multiple signatures from the same person, using the same address, and did not verify whether the person is based in the United Kingdom or the validity of the email address used. They also reported that the Advertising Standards Authority was investigating the group for an advert which claimed 70% of people opposed same-sex marriage, after accusations the claim was "misleading". Later that month, Pink News reported that C4M's petition campaign falsely stated that the sign-up age was 16. It pointed to a presentation by the Catholic Education Service to Catholic school students as young as 11 in South London that encouraged them to do their duty to do "all we can to ensure that the true meaning of marriage is not lost for future generations" and sign the C4M petition.

Three MPs, Sarah Newton, Anne Milton and Dan Byles, complained to C4M that their photos had been used on petition campaign material without their permission. The leaflets in question called the proposed legislation "undemocratic", warned of people being punished for "believing in traditional marriage", and said that many gay people oppose "redefining marriage". Newton complained that constituents had contacted her in a distressed manner over the language used and that they were being led to believe she endorsed the coalition's opinions. Milton explained that she had contacted the Coalition for Marriage twice and requested they stop, but that they had continued doing so. Dan Byles said that constituent comments about the leaflets demonstrated that "they are very open to misrepresentation." A spokesman for the Coalition responded that it was standard practice to use photographs of MPs on campaign literature and only three MPs of the 650 had complained.

=== Polling ===
In a poll commissioned by C4M and conducted by ComRes in 16–25 January 2013, 62 percent of black and minority ethnic (BME) voters opposed same-sex marriage; 49 percent believed that changing the law would lead to those who oppose same-sex marriage being persecuted at work for their views. The figure for Asian people was 57 percent. Another poll conducted by C4M in April 2013 reported that 67 percent of UK Christians feel that they are part of a "persecuted minority". The C4M repeatedly stated that many LGBT people opposed the bill, but failed to offer evidence, while Pink News's January 2013 poll found 98% of their readership support having equal marriage rights for gays and lesbians.

=== Other lobbying efforts ===
The Coalition for Marriage have been widely acknowledged by the British media to be the leading campaign group against same-sex marriage in the United Kingdom. The Daily Telegraph said C4M "orchestrated" opposition to the bill.

The Coalition for Marriage reported the concerns of 121 Conservative Party MPs who said to their constituents that they were uncomfortable with the same-sex marriage proposals. C4M used their correspondence to support its argument that the "issue has never been put before the British public and increasingly MPs realise that it is simply undemocratic to force this through." Conor Burns, close friend of the late Margaret Thatcher, was among the high profile supporters of the C4M cause. However, he later voted in favour of the bill.

When the same-sex marriage legislation received royal assent on 17 July 2013, C4M told Metro that it would "come back to bite" the prime minister. Chairman Colin Hart said: "Mr Cameron needs to remember that the Coalition for Marriage has nearly 700,000 supporters, nearly six times the number of members of the Conservative party."

=== Activities following the legalisation of same-sex marriage ===
Following the legalisation of same-sex marriage in July 2013, the Coalition for Marriage announced plans to employ its database of around 700,000 supporters to campaign in the 2014 European Parliament elections and the general election of 2015.

=== 2015 general election ===
In the 2015 general election, the organisation delivered leaflets for and against former MPs based on their record on the issue of same-sex marriage. Candidates targeted for voting for the act included Nick Clegg, Sarah Wollaston, Julian Huppert, Anna Soubry, Caroline Lucas, Ed Balls, Jenny Chapman and Simon Kirby. Leaflets highlighting opposition were distributed in the seats of Jacob Rees-Mogg, Roger Godsiff and Craig Whittaker.

== See also ==
- Coalition for Equal Marriage
- Same-sex marriage in the United Kingdom
- Civil partnership in the United Kingdom
