= Rainbow Project =

LGBT rights organisation in Northern Ireland

The Rainbow Project
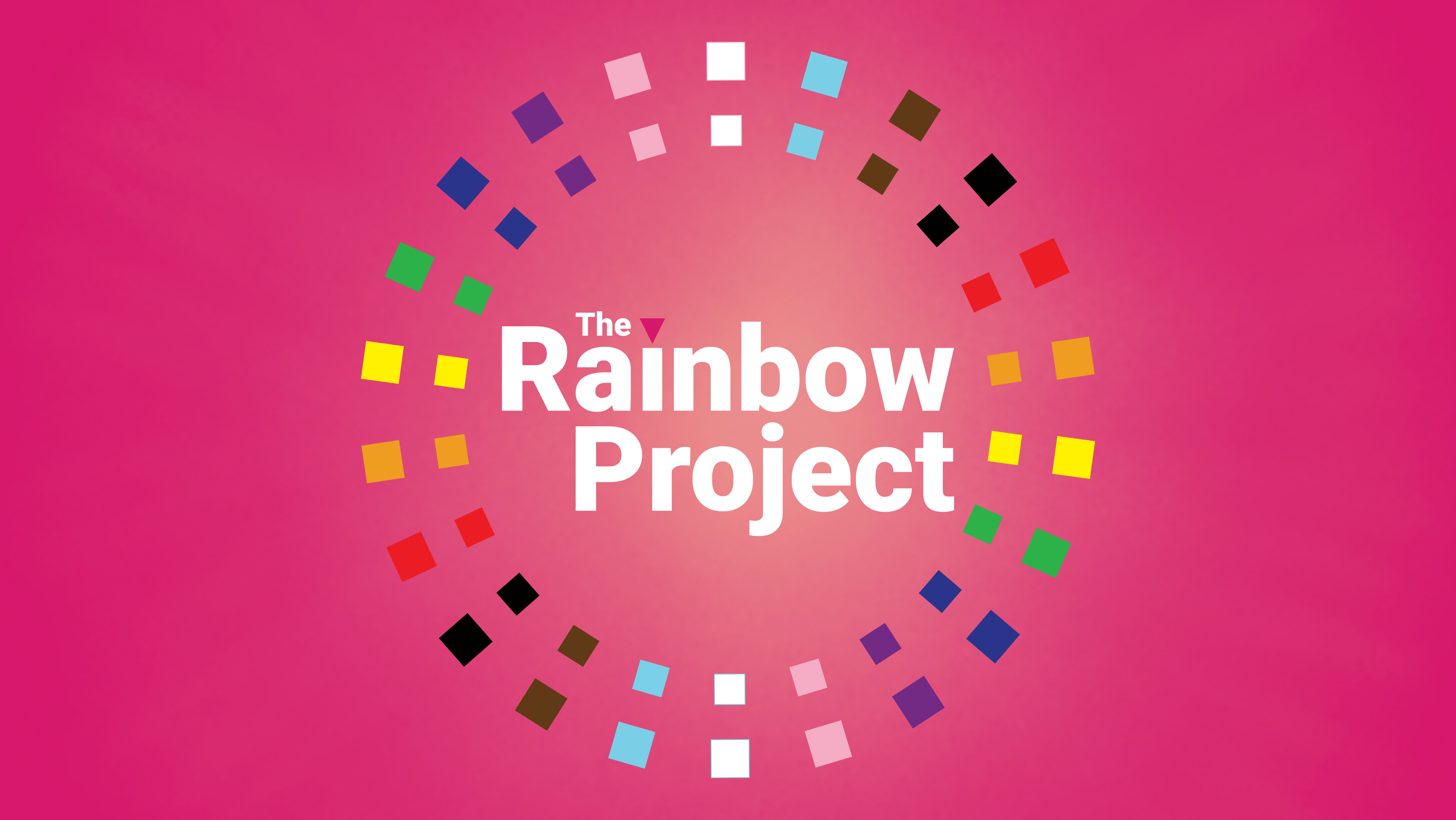
- Formation: 1994
- Type: Charity
- Headquarters: Belfast; Derry
- Location: Northern Ireland
- Director: Scott Cuthbertson
- Key people: - Nuala Devenny, Health and Wellbeing Services Manager; - Jayne Robinson, Business Development Manager; - Aisling Twomey, Policy and Advocacy Manager; - Martin Rolston, Counselling Manager
- Staff: 21
- Website: www.rainbow-project.org

The Rainbow Project is a non-profit organisation based in Northern Ireland that promotes the health and wellbeing of the LGBT people and their families in Northern Ireland. The Rainbow Project is the largest LGBT organisation (by number of staff members) on the island of Ireland and has two central offices, in Belfast and Foyle, Derry.

== History ==
The organisation was established in 1994 by Tom McManus supported by a group of volunteers who were concerned about the spread of HIV infection within the gay male population of Northern Ireland. These volunteers wanted to provide information and support to men who have sex with men (MSM) about HIV/AIDS. They carried out research within the gay and bisexual communities in order to find out what type of information and support services were required.

As a result of this research, the project began to offer information on HIV/AIDS and other sexually transmitted infections (STIs), with HIV awareness a centrally accessible feature on their website. They have also distributed safer sex materials and leaflets at commercial gay venues, LGBT events, and online using a small pot of funds kindly donated by GMFA.

Although initial work was focused on HIV and STI prevention, it became clear that service-users had additional support needs related to their physical health generally as well as their mental & emotional well-being. As such, The Rainbow Project was able to offer professional counselling services to gay/bisexual men, and those unsure of their sexual orientation, as well as providing practical interventions in the form of advocacy support for those men who had been discriminated against or been verbally, physically, and/or sexually assaulted because of their sexual orientation.

== Public work ==
The Rainbow Project has consistently worked to ensure that the needs of LGBT people are being met in the provision of services, in law and socially. In Partnership with Irish Congress of Trade Unions and Amnesty International, The Rainbow Project organised a mass public rally in support of equal marriage on 13 June 2015, with a 20,000 person turnout.

The Rainbow Project has campaigned on several issues which affect LGBT individuals such as adoption, marriage, blood bans, gender recognition and social issues.
