= Idris Elba filmography =

Filmography of an English actor

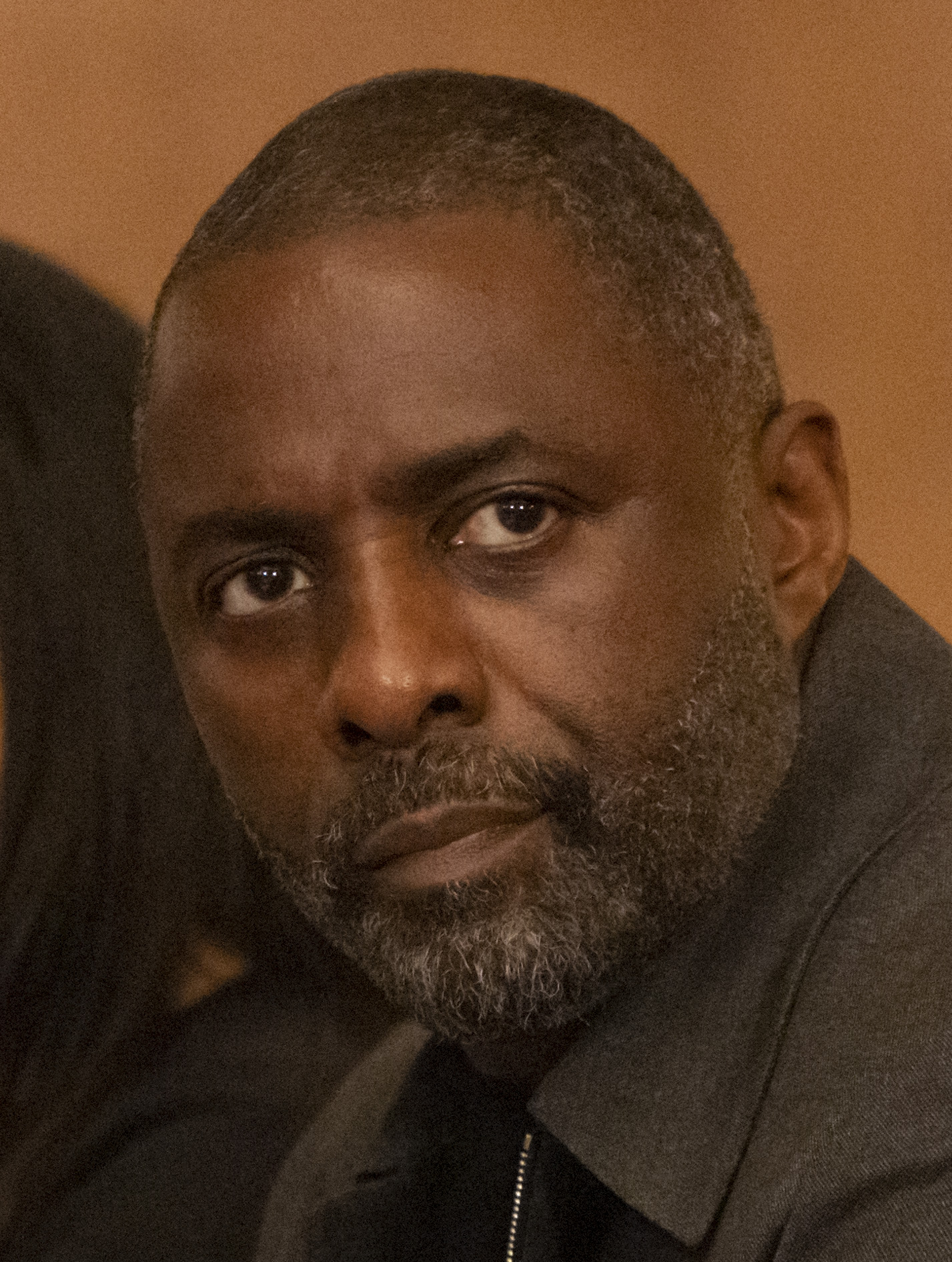
- Elba in 2024

Sir Idris Elba is an English actor. He is known for portraying drug trafficker Stringer Bell on the HBO series The Wire, DCI John Luther on the BBC One series Luther and Nelson Mandela in the biographical film Mandela: Long Walk to Freedom (2013). He has been nominated four times for a Golden Globe Award for Best Actor – Miniseries or Television Film, winning one, and was nominated five times for a Primetime Emmy Award.

== Film ==
Key
†	Denotes films that have not yet been released

Year	Title	Role	Notes
1999	Belle maman	Grégoire	
2000	Sorted	Jam	
2001	Buffalo Soldiers	Kimborough	
2003	One Love	Aaron	
2005	The Gospel	Charles Frank	
2005	Sometimes in April	Augustin	
2007	Daddy's Little Girls	Monty James	
2007	The Reaping	Ben	
2007	28 Weeks Later	General Stone	
2007	American Gangster	"Tango"	
2007	This Christmas	Quentin Whitfield Jr.	
2008	Prom Night	Detective Winn	
2008	RocknRolla	"Mumbles"	
2008	The Human Contract	Larry	
2009	The Unborn	Arthur Wyndham	
2009	Obsessed	Derek Charles	
2010	Legacy	Malcolm Gray	Executive producer
2010	The Losers	Roque	
2010	Takers	Gordon "G" Cozier	
2011	Thor	Heimdall	
2011	Ghost Rider: Spirit of Vengeance	Moreau	
2012	Prometheus	Captain Janek	
2013	Pacific Rim	Stacker Pentecost	
2013	Thor: The Dark World	Heimdall	
2013	Mandela: Long Walk to Freedom	Nelson Mandela	
2014	No Good Deed	Colin Evans	Executive producer
2014	Second Coming	Mark	
2015	The Gunman	Interpol Agent Jackie Barnes	
2015	Avengers: Age of Ultron	Heimdall	
2015	Beasts of No Nation	Commandant	
2016	Zootopia	Chief Bogo	Voice role
2016	The Jungle Book	Shere Khan	Voice role
2016	Bastille Day	Sean Briar	
2016	Finding Dory	Fluke	Voice role
2016	100 Streets	Max	
2016	Star Trek Beyond	Krall / Balthazar Edison	
2017	The Dark Tower	Roland Deschain	
2017	Molly's Game	Charlie Jaffey	
2017	The Mountain Between Us	Ben Bass	
2017	Thor: Ragnarok	Heimdall	
2018	Avengers: Infinity War	Heimdall	
2018	Yardie	—N/a	Director
2019	Fast & Furious: Hobbs & Shaw	Brixton Lore	
2019	Cats	Macavity	
2020	Concrete Cowboy	Harp	Producer
2021	The Suicide Squad	Robert DuBois / Bloodsport	
2021	The Harder They Fall	Rufus Buck	
2022	Sonic the Hedgehog 2	Knuckles the Echidna	Voice role
2022	Thor: Love and Thunder	Heimdall	Cameo; Post-credits scene
2022	Beast	Dr. Nate Samuels	
2022	Three Thousand Years of Longing	Djinn	
2022	The Boy, the Mole, the Fox and the Horse	The Fox	Voice role; short film
2023	Luther: The Fallen Sun	John Luther	Producer
2023	Extraction 2	Alcott	Cameo
2023	Gold: A Journey with Idris Elba	Himself (presenter)	Documentary
2024	A Very Sonic Christmas	Knuckles	Voice role; short film
2024	Sonic the Hedgehog 3	Knuckles	Voice role
2025	Heads of State	Sam Clarke	Executive producer
2025	Fixed	Rocco	Voice role
2025	A House of Dynamite	President of the United States	
2025	Zootopia 2	Chief Bogo	Voice role
2026	Masters of the Universe	Man-At-Arms	
2026	Above the Below †	Jackson	Co-director; post-production
2027	Children of Blood and Bone †	Lekan	Post-production
2027	Sonic the Hedgehog 4 †	Knuckles	Voice role
TBA	This Is How It Goes †	TBA	Director; post-production
TBA	Luther 3 †	John Luther	Post-production; Producer
TBA	Extraction 3 †	Alcott	Filming

== Television ==
Key
†	Denotes television productions that have not yet been released

Year	Title	Role	Notes
1994	2point4 Children	Parachute Instructor	Episode: "Fortuosity"
1994	Space Precinct	Pizza Delivery Man	Episode: "Double Duty"
1994, 1995	The Bill	Earl Lee, Alex Mason	2 episodes
1995	Absolutely Fabulous	Hilton	Episode: "Sex"
1995	Bramwell	Charlie Carter	Episode: "The Outcast's Baby"
1996	The Governor	Officer Chiswick	6 episodes
1996	Crocodile Shoes II	Jo-Jo	Episode: "Troubled Man"
1996	The Ruth Rendell Mysteries	Raffy, Pest Controller	4 episodes
1996	Crucial Tales	Benton	Episode: "Spiders and Flies"
1997	Insiders	Robinson Bennett	6 episodes
1997	Family Affairs	Tim Webster	7 episodes
1997	Silent Witness	Charlie	Episode: "Blood, Sweat & Tears"
1998	Verdict	PC Brian Rawlinson	Episode: "Neighbours from Hell"
1998	Ultraviolet	Vaughan Rice	6 episodes
1999	Dangerfield	Matt Gregory	12 episodes
2000	In Defence	PC Paul Fraser	Episode #1.3
2001	London's Burning	Corporal Richard Frost	2 episodes
2001	Law & Order	Lonnie Liston	Episode: "3 Dawg Night"
2002	The Inspector Lynley Mysteries	Robert Gabriel	Episode: "Payment in Blood"
2002	Hack	Mac Boone	Episode: "My Alibi"
2002–2004	The Wire	Russell "Stringer" Bell	37 episodes
2003	CSI: Miami	Angelo Sedaris	Episode: "The Best Defense"
2003	Queens Supreme	Carla	Episode: "Mad About You"
2003	Soul Food	Smitty	Episode: "Sacrifice Fly"
2005	Girlfriends	Paul	Episode: "All in a Panic"
2005	Sometimes in April	Augustin Muganza	Television film
2005	Jonny Zero	Hodge	Episode: "To Serve and to Protect"
2006	All in the Game	Paul	Television film
2008	The No. 1 Ladies' Detective Agency	Charles Gotso	Episode: "The No. 1 Ladies' Detective Agency"
2009	The Office	Charles Miner	7 episodes
2010	The Big C	Lenny	4 episodes
2010	Walk Like a Panther	—N/a	Executive producer
2010–2011, 2013, 2015, 2019	Luther	John Luther	20 episodes; also associate producer
2011	Aqua Teen Hunger Force	Police Officer	Voice role; episode: "Intervention"
2011	How Hip Hop Changed the World	—N/a	Executive producer
2011	Demons Never Die	—N/a	Executive producer
2012	Idris Elba's How Clubbing Changed the World	Himself (host)	Television documentary
2013	Idris Elba: King of Speed	Himself (host)	2 episodes
2013, 2015	Playhouse Presents	Akuna's Father, The Narrator	Also wrote and directed "The Pavement Psychologist"
2015	Idris Elba: No Limits	Himself (host)	4 episodes
2017	Guerrilla	Kentoro "Kent" Abbasi	4 episodes; also executive producer
2017	Five by Five	Alpha Ash	2 episodes; also executive producer
2017	Idris Elba: Fighter	Himself (host)	Miniseries; also executive producer
2017	The Best FIFA Football Awards 2017	Himself (host)	Television special
2018–2020	In the Long Run	Walter Easmon	19 episodes; also creator
2018	The Best FIFA Football Awards 2018	Himself (host)	Television special
2019	Saturday Night Live	Himself (host)	Episode: "Idris Elba/Khalid"
2019	Turn Up Charlie	Charlie Ayo	8 episodes; also creator and executive producer
2020	Coronavirus, Explained	The Narrator	Episode: "How to Cope"
2020	Idris Elba Meets Paul McCartney	Himself	60-minute BBC special
2022	Idris Elba's Fight School	Himself (presenter)	Five-part series
2022	Zootopia+	Chief Bogo	Voice role, episode: "So You Think You Can Prance?"
2023	What If...?	Heimdall	Voice role, episode: "What if... Hela Found the Ten Rings?"
2023–present	Hijack	Sam Nelson	Main role
2024	Knuckles	Knuckles the Echidna	Voice role, miniseries; also executive producer
2025	Our Knife Crime Crisis	Himself (presenter)	Television special
2025	The Simpsons	The Devil	Voice role, episode: "Treehouse of Horror XXXVI"
TBA	The Greatest of All Time †	TBA	Filming

== Video games ==
Year	Title	Voice role	Notes
2011	Call of Duty: Modern Warfare 3	SFC "Truck"	
2014	FIFA 15	Voice	E3 trailer
2016	Tom Clancy's Rainbow Six: Siege	Team Leader	Televised advertisements
2019	NBA 2K20	Coach Ernie Ames	MyCareer mode
2023	Cyberpunk 2077: Phantom Liberty	Solomon Reed	Also likeness

== Music videos ==
Year	Artist	Title	Role	Notes
2002	Fat Joe featuring Armageddon and Tony Sunshine	"All I Need"	—N/a	
2004	Angie Stone featuring Snoop Dogg	"I Wanna Thank Ya"	—N/a	
2010	Giggs	"Hustle On"	Driver	Also producer
2012	Mumford and Sons	"Lover of the Light"	Blind Man	Also co-director and producer
2014	K Michelle	"Damn"	—N/a	Director
2014	Various	"Imagine" (UNICEF: World version)	Himself	Cameo
2016	Macklemore	"Dance Off"	Himself	Featured artist
2019	Wiley, Sean Paul, & Stefflon Don	"Boasty"	Himself	Featured artist
2019	Stormzy	"Vossi Bop"	Himself	Cameo
2021	Connor Price	"Courteney Cox"	Himself	Featured artist
2025	Connor Price	"More Mentors"	Himself	Featured artist
