= Africa's Next Top Model season 1 =

Africa's Next Top Model
- Season 1
- Judges: Oluchi Onweagba; Remi Adetiba; Josie Borain
- No. of contestants: 12
- Winner: Aamito Lagum
- No. of episodes: 10

Release
- Original network: M-net Africa Magic
- Original release: 10 November 2013 – 12 January 2014

Africa's Next Top Model, cycle 1 is the first installment of a reality television show in which a number of women compete for the title of Africa's Next Top Model along with the chance to begin their career in the modeling industry. The show features aspiring models from the entire African continent.

The prize package for this cycle included a 1-year modeling contract with New York-based modelling agency DNA Model Management, a product endorsement deal with P&G, a 1-year contract as an ambassador for South African Tourism, SNAPP, Etisalat, and Verve, and a cash prize of 50,000 USD.

The winner of the competition was 21-year-old Aamito Lagum, representing the nation of Uganda.

== Series summary ==
=== Auditions ===
Casting calls and auditions were held in several countries and on different dates, listed below:

- 6 July at Polana Serena Hotel, Maputo, Mozambique
- 9 July at Sandton Convention Center, Johannesburg, South Africa
- 14 July at Kenyatta International Conference Centre, Nairobi, Kenya
- 20 July at M Plaza Hotel, Accra, Ghana
- 23 July at Federal Palace Hotel, Lagos, Nigeria
- 28 July at Centro Cultural Paz Flor (Paz Flor Convention Centre), Luanda, Angola
- 1 August at Cape Town International Convention Centre, Cape Town, South Africa

After the selection process, 12 models were chosen to participate in the competition.

=== Requirements ===
All applicants were required to be between 18 and 27 years old at the time they auditioned or applied for the show. Additional requirements stated that if a model was being represented by a modeling agency at the time she applied, she had to terminate that representation prior. Contestants from any country in Africa were encouraged to apply. The minimum height requirement was 170 cm, or 5'7".

== Cast ==
=== Contestants ===
(Ages stated are at start of contest)

Country	Contestant	Age	Height	Hometown	Finish	Place
Kenya	Steffi Reti	20	1.78 m (5 ft 10 in)	Mombasa	Episode 2	12-11
Tunisia	Marwa Faiza	22	1.70 m (5 ft 7 in)	Nairobi	Episode 2	12-11
Mozambique	Safira Mariquele	20	1.83 m (6 ft 0 in)	Maputo	Episode 3	10
Nigeria	Omowunmi Wanyonyi	23	1.80 m (5 ft 11 in)	Lagos	Episode 4	9
South Africa	Rhulani Kubayi	20	1.85 m (6 ft 1 in)	Johannesburg	Episode 5	8
Nigeria	Joyce Zi Chidebe	24	1.80 m (5 ft 11 in)	Lagos	Episode 6	7
South Africa	Michelle Allen	22	1.74 m (5 ft 8 1/2 in)	Pietermaritzburg	Episode 7	6
Ghana	Roselyn Ashkar	22	1.75 m (5 ft 9 in)	Accra	Episode 8	5-4
South Africa	Cheandre van Blerk	20	1.70 m (5 ft 7 in)	Johannesburg	Episode 8	5-4
Nigeria	Opeyemi Awoyemi	25	1.83 m (6 ft 0 in)	Lagos	Episode 10	3-2
Angola	Michaela Pinto	21	1.79 m (5 ft 10 1/2 in)	Luanda	Episode 10	3-2
Uganda	Aamito Lagum	20	1.81 m (5 ft 11 1/2 in)	Kampala	Episode 10	1

=== Judges ===
- Oluchi Onweagba (host)
- Remi Adetiba
- Josie Borain

=== Other cast members ===
- Carl Isaacs
- Crystal Birch

== Episodes ==
=== Episode 1 ===
First aired 10 November 2013

=== Episode 2 ===
First aired 17 November 2013

- Guest judge: Carl Isaacs

=== Episode 3 ===
First aired 24 November 2013

- Guest judge: Thula Sindi

=== Episode 4 ===
First aired 1 December 2013

- Guest judge: Malibongwe Tyilo

=== Episode 5 ===
First aired 8 December 2013

- Guest judge: Annabel Onyango

=== Episode 6 ===
First aired 15 December 2013

- Guest judge: Marianne Fassler

=== Episode 7 ===
First aired 22 December 2013

- Guest judge: Craig Port

=== Episode 8 ===
First aired 29 December 2013

- Guest judge: David Tlale

=== Episode 9 ===
First aired 5 January 2014

- Guest judge: Jackie Burger

=== Episode 10 ===
First aired 12 January 2014

- Guest judge: Butterfly Cayley

== Results ==
Order	Episodes									
Order	1 (Note: In episode 1, Oluchi called each contestant to advise them of making the show. This call-out order is not reflective of their performance.)	2 (Note: In episode 2, Cheandre, Marwa, Omowunmi and Steffi landed in the bottom four. Cheandre and Omowunmi were declared safe and Marwa and Steffi were eliminated.)	3	4	5	6	7	8 (Note: In episode 8, Cheandre, Opeyemi and Roselyn landed in the bottom three. Oluchi handed the final photograph to Opeyemi, eliminating Cheandre and Roselyn.)	9 (Note: In episode 9, Michaela and Opeyemi landed in the bottom two. After handing Opeyemi her photograph, Oluchi revealed that there would be no elimination.)	10
1	Omowunmi	Aamito	Cheandre	Joyce	Opeyemi	Roselyn	Aamito	Aamito	Aamito	Aamito
2	Joyce	Michaela	Rhulani	Cheandre	Joyce	Aamito	Opeyemi	Michaela	Opeyemi	Michaela; Opeyemi
3	Opeyemi	Opeyemi	Michelle	Rhulani	Roselyn	Opeyemi	Cheandre	Opeyemi	Michaela	Michaela; Opeyemi
4	Roselyn	Safira	Joyce	Roselyn	Michaela	Michelle	Michaela	Cheandre; Roselyn		
5	Cheandre	Roselyn	Omowunmi	Michaela	Michelle	Cheandre	Roselyn	Cheandre; Roselyn		
6	Michelle	Rhulani	Michaela	Michelle	Aamito	Michaela	Michelle			
7	Rhulani	Michelle	Aamito	Aamito	Cheandre	Joyce				
8	Marwa	Joyce	Opeyemi	Opeyemi	Rhulani					
9	Aamito	Cheandre; Omowunmi	Roselyn	Omowunmi						
10	Steffi	Cheandre; Omowunmi	Safira							
11	Safira	Marwa; Steffi								
12	Michaela	Marwa; Steffi								

The contestant was eliminated
The contestant was in a non-elimination bottom two
The contestant won the competition

=== Average call-out order ===
Final episode is not included.

Rank by average	Place	Model	Call-out total	Number of call-outs	Call-out average
1	1	Aamito	27	8	3.38
2	2–3	Opeyemi	30	8	3.75
3	2–3	Michaela	31	8	3.88
4	7	Joyce	22	5	4.40
5–6	4–5	Cheandre	31	7	4.43
5–6	4–5	Roselyn	31	7	4.43
7	8	Rhulani	19	4	4.75
8	6	Michelle	31	6	5.17
9	10	Safira	14	2	7.00
10	9	Omowunmi	23	3	7.67
11–12		Marwa	11	1	11.00
11–12		Steffi	11	1	11.00
