= Çeşm-i Bülbül =

Decorative glass artware developed in the Ottoman Empire

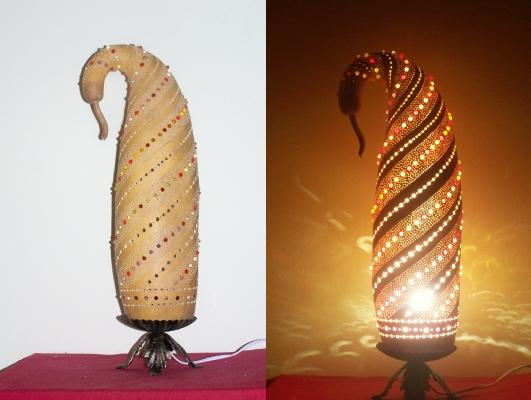
Modern lamp with Çeşm-i Bülbül pattern

Çeşm-i Bülbül or Çeşmibülbül (Ottoman Turkish: چشم بلبل, romanized: Çeşm-i Bülbül, lit. 'Eye of the Nightingale') is a decorative glass art form developed in the late 18th–early 19th century Ottoman Empire. Its name refers to the intricate spiral or eye-shaped patterns in the glass which were likened to a nightingale’s eye. According to a traditional account, Sultan Selim III sent the glassmaker Mehmed Dede to Venice to study Venetian glassmaking. The account associates his return with the development of glass production at Beykoz and with techniques related to Venetian filigree glass. The Ottoman marshal, ambassador and industrialist Fethi Ahmet Pasna is credited with popularizing the production of Çeşmibülbül.

== Technique ==
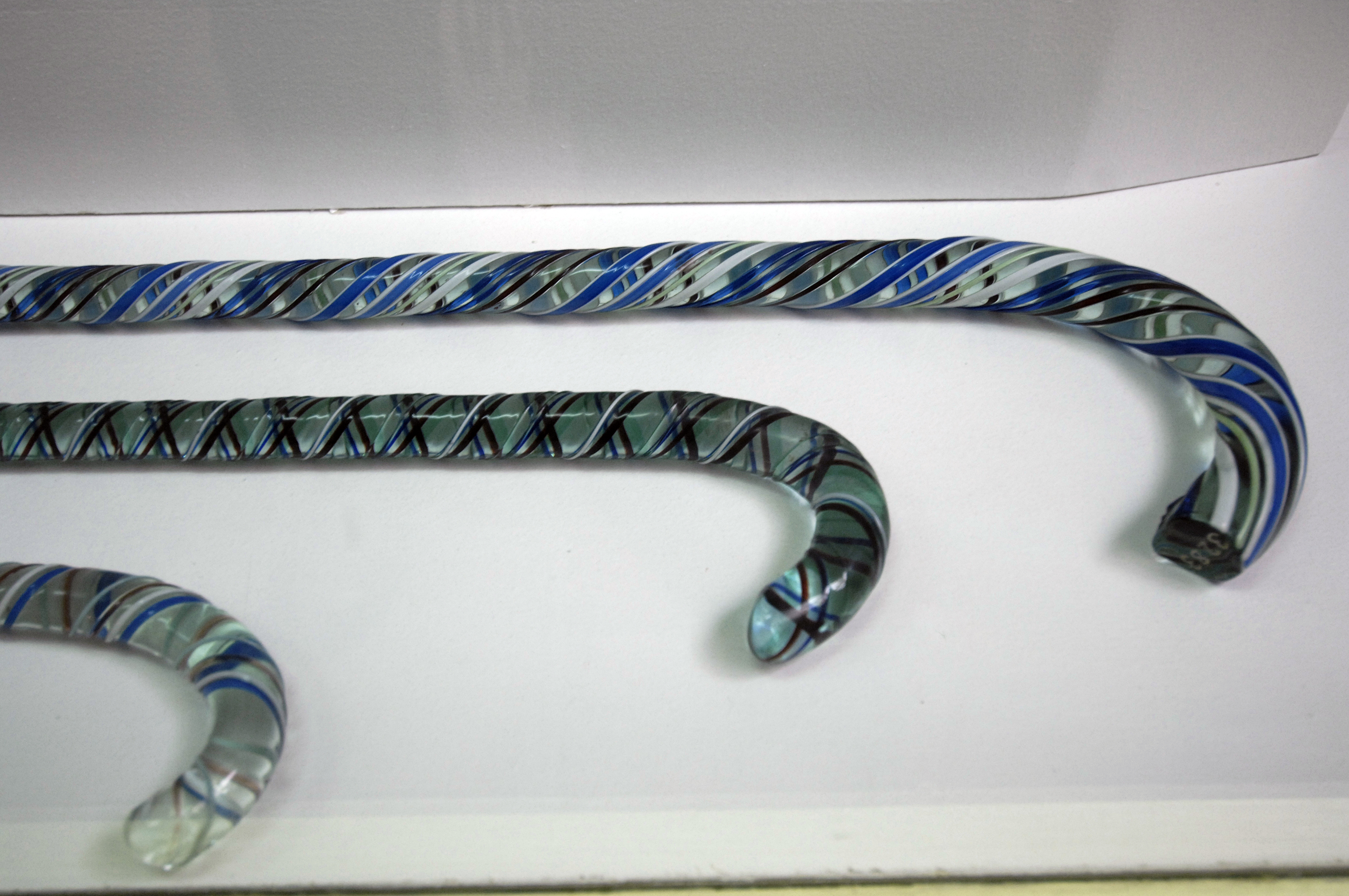
Canes used in the production of Çeşm-i Bülbül

Çeşm-i Bülbül is a twisted cane filigree technique. Çeşm-i Bülbül is a filigree-glass technique in which colored glass canes, commonly white and blue, are incorporated into the vessel and twisted during forming to produce a spiral pattern. The parallel canes spiral around the vessel, producing highly ornamental vases, bowls, and cups with the hallmark helical or net-like filigree pattern. When held to light or rotated, the fused rods create concentric rings and striations that resemble a nightingale’s eye. These objects became prized both in Ottoman palaces and later among collectors worldwide. Today, authentic Çeşm-i Bülbül pieces can be found in museums (including the Topkapı Palace collections in Istanbul) and continue to be produced in Turkish glass workshops, particularly around Beykoz, which was historically the center of Ottoman glassmaking.

== In popular culture ==
A Çeşm-i Bülbül glass bottle is a key plot element in the 2022 fantasy film Three Thousand Years of Longing, directed by George Miller. The film, which stars Tilda Swinton as a narratologist and Idris Elba as a Djinn, is based on the A.S. Byatt short story "The Djinn in the Nightingale's Eye". In the story, the protagonist purchases the bottle in Istanbul's Grand Bazaar, inadvertently releasing the Djinn who has been trapped inside the Çeşm-i Bülbül glass bottle.

== Sources ==
- Carboni, Stefano (2001). "Glass in the Age of the Empires". In Carboni, Stefano; Whitehouse, David; Brill, Robert H.; Gudenrath, William (eds.). Glass of the Sultans. New York: Metropolitan Museum of Art. ISBN 978-0-87099-986-4.
- Küçükerman, Önder (1985). Art of glass and traditional Turkish glassware (in Turkish). Türkiye İş Bankası Kültür Yayınları.
