= List of awards and nominations received by Idris Elba =

Idris Elba awards and nominations
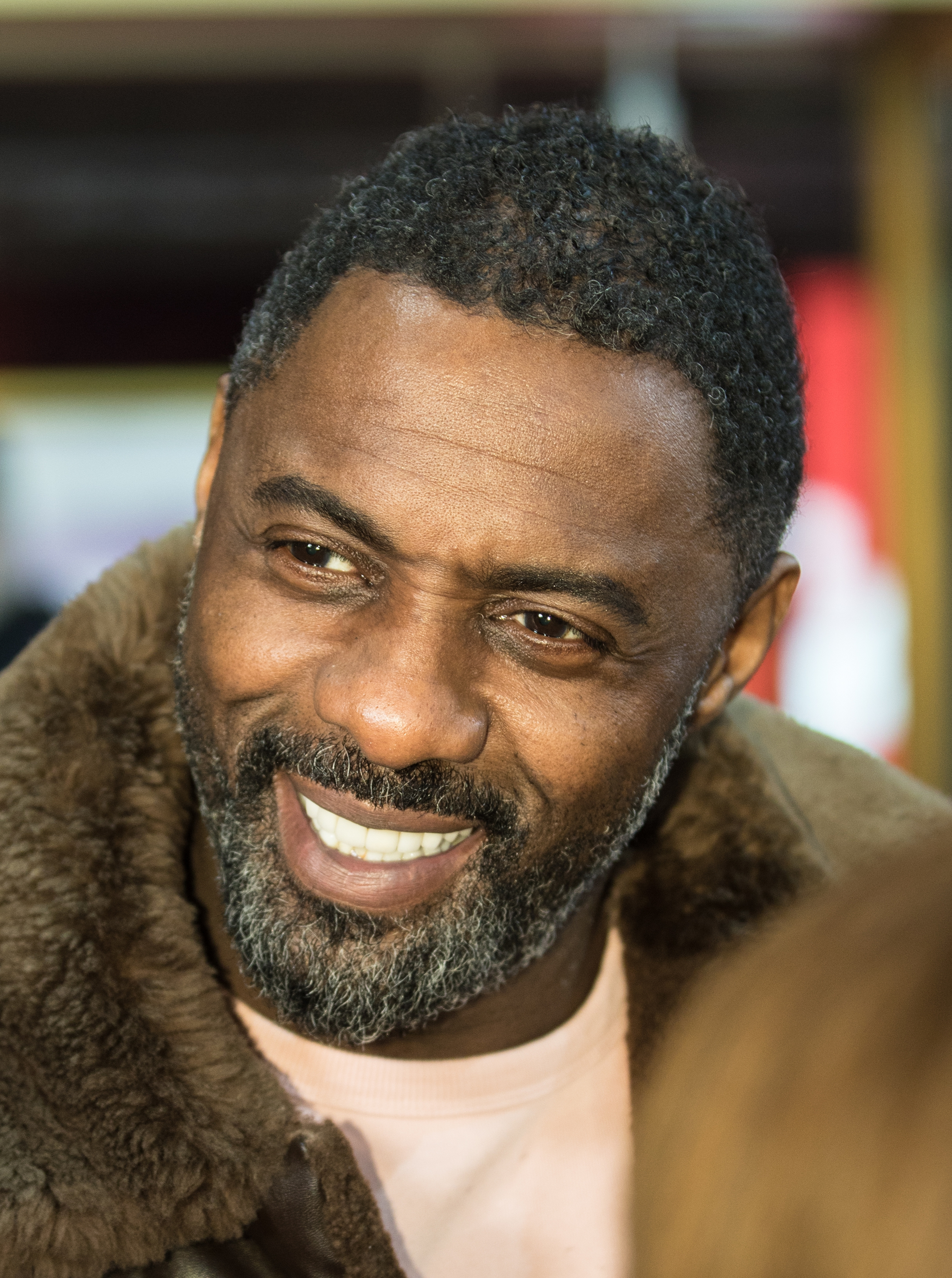
- Elba at the 2018 Berlinale
Awards and nominations
Award	Wins	Nominations
British Academy Film Awards	0	1
British Academy Television Awards	0	1
Golden Globe Awards	1	6
Primetime Emmy Awards	0	8
Screen Actors Guild Awards	2	4

Totals (Note: Certain award groups do not simply award one winner. They acknowledge several different recipients, have runners-up, and have third place. Since this is a specific recognition and is different from losing an award, runner-up mentions are considered wins in this award tally. For simplification and to avoid errors, each award in this list has been presumed to have had a prior nomination.)
- Wins: 16
- Nominations: 151

The following is a list of awards and nominations received by Idris Elba.

Idris Elba is an English actor known for his roles in film and television. He has received a Golden Globe Award and two Screen Actors Guild Awards as well as nominations for a British Academy Film Award, a British Academy Television Award and eight Primetime Emmy Awards.

For his role as DCI John Luther in the BBC One series Luther (2010–2019) he won the Golden Globe Award for Best Actor – Miniseries or Television Film as well as a four nominations for the Primetime Emmy Award for Outstanding Lead Actor in a Limited Series or Movie. He was also Emmy-nominated for his guest role as a painter and romantic interest in Showtime comedy-drama series The Big C (2011) and for his leading role as a corporate business negotiator in Apple TV+ thriller series Hijack (2024).

On film, he portrayed a ruthless and charismatic warlord in the Netflix drama Beasts of No Nation (2015) for which he received the Screen Actors Guild Award for Outstanding Actor in a Supporting Role as well as nominations for a BAFTA Award for Best Actor in a Supporting Role and Golden Globe Award for Best Supporting Actor – Motion Picture. He portrayed Nelson Mandela in Mandela: Long Walk to Freedom (2013) for which he was nominated for the Golden Globe Award for Best Actor in a Motion Picture – Drama.

== Major associations ==
=== BAFTA Awards ===
Year	Category	Nominated work	Result	Ref.
British Academy Film Awards
2015	Best Actor in a Supporting Role	Beasts of No Nation	Nominated	
British Academy Television Awards
2016	Best Actor	Luther	Nominated	

=== Critics' Choice Awards ===
Year	Category	Nominated work	Result	Ref.
Critics' Choice Television Awards
2012	Best Actor in a Miniseries or Movie	Luther	Nominated	
2016	Best Actor in a Miniseries or Movie	Luther	Won	
Critics' Choice Super Awards
2022	Best Villain in a Movie	The Harder They Fall	Nominated	
2026	Best Actor in an Action Series	Hijack	Nominated	

=== Emmy Awards ===
Year	Category	Nominated work	Result	Ref.
Primetime Emmy Awards
2011	Outstanding Guest Actor in a Comedy Series	The Big C (Episode: "Blue-Eyed Iris")	Nominated	
2011	Outstanding Lead Actor in a Limited or Anthology Series or Movie	Luther (Series 1)	Nominated	
2012	Outstanding Lead Actor in a Limited or Anthology Series or Movie	Luther (Series 2)	Nominated	
2014	Outstanding Lead Actor in a Limited or Anthology Series or Movie	Luther (Series 3)	Nominated	
2016	Outstanding Lead Actor in a Limited or Anthology Series or Movie	Luther (Series 4)	Nominated	
2024	Outstanding Lead Actor in a Drama Series	Hijack (Episode: "Comply Slowly")	Nominated	
2025	Outstanding Narrator	Erased: WW2's Heroes of Color (Episode: "D-Day")	Nominated	
2026	Outstanding Movie	Heads of State	Nominated	

=== Golden Globe Awards ===
Year	Category	Nominated work	Result	Ref.
2010	Best Actor – Miniseries or Television Film	Luther	Nominated	
2011	Best Actor – Miniseries or Television Film	Luther	Won	
2013	Best Actor – Miniseries or Television Film	Luther	Nominated	
2013	Best Actor – Motion Picture Drama	Mandela: Long Walk to Freedom	Nominated	
2015	Best Supporting Actor – Motion Picture	Beasts of No Nation	Nominated	
2015	Best Actor – Miniseries or Television Film	Luther	Nominated	

=== Screen Actors Guild Awards ===
Year	Category	Nominated work	Result	Ref.
2007	Outstanding Performance by a Cast in a Motion Picture	American Gangster	Nominated	
2015	Outstanding Performance by a Cast in a Motion Picture	Beasts of No Nation	Nominated	
2015	Outstanding Performance by a Male Actor in a Supporting Role	Beasts of No Nation	Won	
2015	Outstanding Performance by a Male Actor in a Miniseries or Television Movie	Luther	Won	

== Miscellaneous awards ==
Organizations	Year	Category	Work	Result	Ref.
BET Awards	2007	BET Award for Best Actor	Daddy's Little Girls	Nominated	
BET Awards	2008	BET Award for Best Actor	This Christmas / American Gangster / 28 Weeks Later	Nominated	
BET Awards	2009	BET Award for Best Actor	RocknRolla / The Unborn	Nominated	
BET Awards	2010	BET Award for Best Actor	The Losers	Won	
BET Awards	2011	BET Award for Best Actor	Takers / Luther	Won	
BET Awards	2012	BET Award for Best Actor	Thor / Ghost Rider: Spirit of Vengeance / Luther	Nominated	
BET Awards	2014	BET Award for Best Actor	Mandela: Long Walk to Freedom / Thor: The Dark World	Nominated	
BET Awards	2015	BET Award for Best Actor	Luther / No Good Deed	Nominated	
Black Reel Award	2005	Best Actor	The Gospel	Nominated	
Black Reel Award	2005	Best Actor in a TV Movie	Sometimes in April	Nominated	
Black Reel Award	2009	Best Ensemble	Takers	Nominated	
Black Reel Award	2012	Best Actor in a TV Movie	Luther	Won	
Black Reel Award	2017	Best Voice Performance	The Jungle Book	Won	
Black Reel Award	2017	Best Voice Performance	Zootopia	Nominated	
Black Reel Award	2017	Best Voice Performance	Finding Dory	Nominated	
Black Reel Award	2018	Best Supporting Actor	Molly's Game	Nominated	
Black Reel Award	2019	Best Actor in a Comedy Series	Turn Up Charlie	Nominated	
Black Reel Award	2019	Best Actor in a Limited Series or TV Movie	Luther	Nominated	
Black Reel Award	2019	Best Guest Actor in a Comedy Series	Saturday Night Live	Nominated	
Black Reel Award	2019	Outstanding Emerging Director	Yardie	Nominated	
Black Reel Award	2019	Outstanding Independent Film	Yardie	Nominated	
Black Reel Award	2022	Best Supporting Actor	The Harder They Fall	Nominated	
Black Reel Award	2023	Best Voice Performance	Sonic the Hedgehog 2	Nominated	
Black Reel Award	2024	Best Actor in a Drama Series	Hijack	Won	
The Game Awards	2023	Best Performance	Cyberpunk 2077: Phantom Liberty	Nominated	
Kids' Choice Award	2016	Favorite Villain	Star Trek Beyond	Nominated	
Gotham Independent Film Awards	2021	Ensemble Tribute Award	The Harder They Fall	Won	
NAACP Image Award	2005	Outstanding Actor in a Miniseries or Television Movie	Sometimes in April	Nominated	
NAACP Image Award	2009	Outstanding Actor in a Motion Picture	Obsessed	Nominated	
NAACP Image Award	2011	Outstanding Supporting Actor in a Motion Picture	Takers	Nominated	
NAACP Image Award	2011	Outstanding Actor in a Miniseries or Television Movie	Luther	Won	
NAACP Image Award	2014	Outstanding Actor in a Miniseries or Television Movie	Luther	Won	
NAACP Image Award	2017	Outstanding Character Voice-Over Performance	The Jungle Book	Won	
NAACP Image Award	2020	Outstanding Actor in a Television Movie, Limited Series or Dramatic Special	Luther	Nominated	
NAACP Image Award	2021	Outstanding Actor in a Comedy Series	In the Long Run	Nominated	
NAACP Image Award	2022	Outstanding Supporting Actor	The Harder They Fall	Nominated	
NAACP Image Award	2024	Outstanding Actor in a Drama Series	Hijack	Nominated	
NAACP Image Award	2026	Outstanding Ensemble Cast in a Motion Picture	A House of Dynamite	Nominated	
Satellite Award	2010	Best Actor in a Miniseries or Movie	Luther	Nominated	
Satellite Award	2011	Best Actor in a Miniseries or Movie	Luther	Nominated	
Satellite Award	2012	Best Actor in a Miniseries or Movie	Luther	Nominated	
Saturn Award	2022	Best Actor	The Suicide Squad	Nominated	

== Festival and critics awards ==
Organizations	Year	Category	Work	Result	Ref.
Berlin International Film Festival	2018	Panorama Award	Yardie	Nominated	
Capri Hollywood International Film Festival	2013	Best Actor	Mandela: Long Walk to Freedom	Won	
Indiana Film Journalists Association	2015	Best Supporting Actor	Beasts of No Nation	Nominated	
Independent Spirit Awards	2015	Best Supporting Male	Beasts of No Nation	Won	
Independent Spirit Awards	2025	Best New Non-Scripted or Documentary Series	Erased: WW2's Heroes of Color	Nominated	
London Critics Circle Film Awards	2016	British/Irish Actor of the Year	Beasts of No Nation	Nominated	
Washington D.C. Area Film Critics Association	2015	Best Supporting Actor	Beasts of No Nation	Won	
