= Aamito Lagum =

Ugandan model (born 1992)

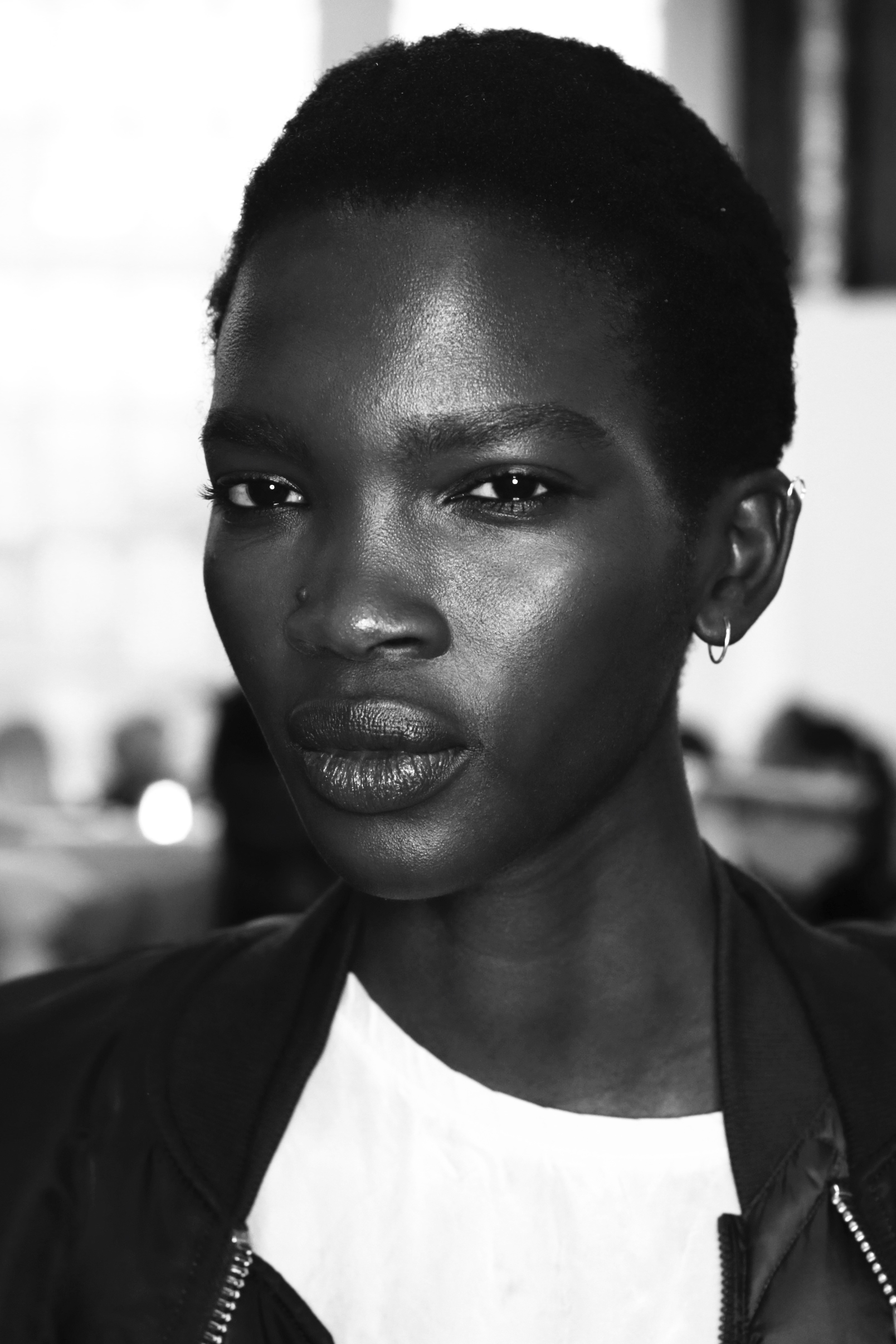
- Lagum in 2016
- Born: Aamito Stacie Lagum; 3 December 1992 (age 33); Kampala, Uganda
- Occupation: Model
- Years active: 2013–present
- Modelling information
- Height: 1.81 m (5 ft 11 1/2 in)
- Hair colour: Black
- Eye colour: Brown
- Agency: Heroes Model Management (New York); Women Management (Milan)

Aamito Stacie Lagum (born 3 December 1992) is a Ugandan actress and fashion model. She is primarily recognised for being the only winner of Africa's Next Top Model.

== Early life ==
Lagum was raised by a single mother, Sidonia Ayaa, in Kampala. After losing her job, her mother relocated to Kitgum to move in with her grandparents. Later Lagum moved back to Kampala to continue her schooling at St. Jude Primary School, Katikamu Seventh Day Adventist Senior Secondary School and St. Lawrence High School.

At the age of sixteen, Lagum began to pursue modelling as a career. Her first job was in Ugandan Fashion Week, where she walked for Gloria Wavamunno's GW Collection. In 2012, Lagum met designer Adele Dejak, who took her to Kenya for a photo shoot.

== Africa's Next Top Model ==
In 2013, Lagum took part in a casting call for Africa's Next Top Model taking a 16-hour bus ride from Kampala to Nairobi. She was later called by host Oluchi Onweagba and was chosen to fly to Cape Town as one of the twelve finalists for the show.

Lagum quickly gained notice from the judges and guests of the show, winning several best photos along with the opportunity to appear in an editorial spread for South African Elle for having received best picture in week 9. Lagum made it to the finale on the tenth week of the competition, having made no appearances in the bottom two. After a casting session with DNA Models, she was crowned as the winner of the show.

As part of her prizes Lagum received a 1-year modelling contract with DNA Model Management, product endorsement deals with P&G, Etisalat, Snapp and Verve International, a 1-year contract as an ambassador for South African Tourism and a cash prize of $50,000 USD.

== Post-show career ==
After winning Africa's Next Top Model, Lagum signed with Boss Model Management in South Africa and was featured in an editorial for Marie Claire South Africa in August 2014. She later signed with DNA Model Management and moved to New York City. Lagum debuted in the F/W 2015 season, walking for the likes of Lacoste, Marc by Marc Jacobs, J. Mendel, Rag & Bone, Giles, Jonathan Saunders, Paul Smith, and Bottega Veneta. She then went on to open Balenciaga in Paris, making her the first model of colour to open the show under Alexander Wang. Subsequently, she modeled for Lanvin, Dries van Noten, H&M, Giambattista Valli and Hermès.

At the end of the season, she was listed as one of the Top Newcomers by both models.com and style.com. Since then, she has appeared in various magazines, including i-D, Interview, Love, W, V, American Harper's Bazaar, Italian and South African Elle, L'Officiel, Italian, Ukrainian, British, German, Mexican, and Spanish Vogue, Teen Vogue, and Italian Vanity Fair. In April 2017, she was featured on the cover of American Allure magazine. She was featured on the cover of British Elle in August later that year. Lagum has also appeared in Lookbooks for Hugo Boss, Area, Narciso Rodriguez, Kenzo, Acne Studios, Guerlain, Nordstrom, Barneys New York, Sonia Rykiel, Saks Fifth Avenue, as well as advertorials for Kenzo and advertising campaigns for Marc Jacobs, shot by David Sims.

In October 2015, Lagum was ranked by Cosmopolitan as one of the most successful contestants of the Top Model franchise.

Lagum played the role of Queen of Sheba in the fantasy romantic drama film Three Thousand Years of Longing directed by George Miller which had its theatrical release in 2022.

== Filmography ==
- Three Thousand Years of Longing (2022)

== See also ==
- Kitgum District
