= Things Fall Apart (upcoming TV series) =

Upcoming American TV series

- Based on: Things Fall Apart by Chinua Achebe
- Starring: Idris Elba

Production
- Executive producers: David Oyelowo; Idris Elba
- Production companies: A24; Yoruba Saxon Productions; 22 Summers

Things Fall Apart is an upcoming television series based on Chinua Achebe’s 1958 novel of the same name. The series is set to star Idris Elba as the protagonist, Okonkwo.

== Cast ==
- Idris Elba as Okonkwo

== Production ==
=== Development ===
The adaptation was announced in September 2024, with A24 acquiring the rights to Achebe's novel. Idris Elba and David Oyelowo joined as executive producers, with Elba also taking on the lead role of Okonkwo. Elba's production company, 22 Summers, and Oyelowo's Yoruba Saxon Productions are collaborating on the series.

The announcement of Idris Elba portraying Okonkwo sparked intense debate on the importance of cultural authenticity. On the other hand, a more liberal group supported Elba’s casting, emphasizing the universal appeal of Things Fall Apart as global literature rather than an exclusively Igbo land narrative.
