= Sabrina Dhowre =

Canadian model and media personality (born 1989)

- Dhowre Elba in 2026
- Born: Sabrina Hibo Dhowre; June 16, 1989 (age 37); Montreal, Quebec, Canada
- Citizenship: United States; Canada; Somalia
- Education: Simon Fraser University
- Occupations: Model; media personality; businesswoman
- Years active: 2014–present
- Spouse: Idris Elba (m. 2019)
- Modelling information
- Height: 1.77 m (5 ft 10 in)
- Hair colour: Black
- Eye colour: Brown
- Agency: IMG Models (London)

Sabrina Hibo Dhowre, Lady Elba (née Dhowre; born June 16, 1989), is a Canadian model, media personality, businesswoman and goodwill ambassador of the United Nations's International Fund for Agricultural Development.

== Early life ==
Dhowre was born in Montreal, Canada, and is of Somali descent. She was the second oldest of her five siblings, raised by a single mother, and moved to Vancouver at the age of 12. After graduating from high school, she enrolled at Simon Fraser University, earning her bachelor's degree in philosophy, with intentions of going to law school.

== Career ==
Sabrina became a model, and was featured in various magazines, such as British Vogue and Elle. She also was crowned "Ms. Vancouver" at a beauty pageant in 2014. Her agency is IMG Models in London.

=== Charitable work ===
In April 2020, she was appointed as a United Nations goodwill ambassador for the International Fund for Agricultural Development (IFAD). Her mother first introduced her and her husband to the IFAD. Dhowre later said that her mother, Maryam Egal, was "probably the reason" she worked with IFAD.

She worked with her husband Idris Elba, also a goodwill ambassador, with IFAD to help launch a new $40 million fund intended on lessening impact of COVID-19 on "farmers and food producers in rural areas". Both later worked with the IFAD on projects in Kenya, Zambia, and Egypt, aimed at helping farmers, and combating hunger and climate change.

She also works with civil society organizations, such as Conservation International, on issues relating to the environment. and Global Citizen. At COP27, in November 2022, she was interviewed about the impact of climate change and the importance of empowering, and investing in, rural areas, to which she stated that there need to be long-term solutions, and said that impact of climate change in rural areas is "devastating". In 2022, she became a co-chair of the European Board of Global Citizen.

In January 2023, she and her husband later received the Crystal Award at the World Economic Forum in Davos, where they were speakers. During the talk, she focused on food insecurity in Sudan, Haiti, Somalia, and elsewhere, and struggles faced by small farmers. In February 2023, she attended the Time 100 Impact Awards in Dubai with her husband.

In June 2024, Dhowre and her husband collaborated with Christian Louboutin on a capsule collection "Walk a Mile in My Shoes" where 100% of proceeds are donated to six charities worldwide.

=== Other work ===
In February 2021, it was announced that the companies of Dhowre and her husband, Idris Elba, would be developing an Afrofuturist adult animated, sci-fi, series, tentatively titled Dantai, for Crunchyroll, a series said to be about a time when biotech has "created an ever-widening gap between the haves and have-nots". The series was also described as an "afropunk sci-fi series" by Anime News Network. In an April 2021 interview with Den of Geek, Idris Elba said the series is "mainly the brainchild" of Dhowre, who he described as a "super geek when it comes to anime."

In 2022, Dhowre and her husband created a lifestyle and wellness brand known as S'ABLE Labs.

Dhowre appeared in the film Three Thousand Years of Longing (2022) as "British Council Lady".

== Personal life ==
Dhowre met Idris Elba at a jazz bar in 2017, and they were married in Marrakesh, Morocco in April 2019. They honeymooned in Tanzania.
