= Africa's Next Top Model =

Television series

- Africa's Next Top Model logo
- Created by: Tyra Banks
- Judges: Oluchi Onweagba
- Opening theme: Wanna be on top?
- Original language: English
- No. of seasons: 1
- No. of episodes: 10

Production
- Running time: 45 minutes; (excluding commercials)
- Production company: Lulu Productions

Original release
- Network: Africa Magic
- Release: 10 November 2013 – 12 January 2014

Africa's Next Top Model is a reality television show and spin-off to America's Next Top Model. It follows the format of the original version, and documents a competition in which a number of aspiring models compete for the title of Africa's Next Top Model and a chance to start a career in the modeling industry. The show is hosted by model Oluchi Onweagba, and features contestants from countries in Africa.

The first season ("cycle") aired on Africa Magic from November 2013 to January 2014. The winner of the competition was 20-year-old Aamito Lagum, who represented Uganda.

== Controversy ==
=== West Africa's Next Top Model ===
West Africa's Next Top Model logo

In 2008, a similar adaptation titled West Africa's Next Top Model was planned and would have featured contestants originating from the West African countries of Côte d'Ivoire, Ghana, Sierra Leone, Senegal, Liberia and Nigeria. The competition was also supposed to be hosted by Oluchi Onweagba. Auditions began in March 2009, but for unknown reasons, the series was left without a station and never aired, and no contestants were selected. On 12 February 2016, a federal high court in Abuja dismissed preliminary objections regarding a ₦780 billion copyright lawsuit by Chudi Charles, CEO of International Pageant and Films, against Onweagba for infringing his West Africa's Next Top Model trademark, which he had registered in 2003; After filing the lawsuit against Onweagba, as well as the Nigerian Copyright Commission, Etisalat Nigeria, Guinness Nigeria Plc, Mtech, Multichoice Nigeria and CBS, Onweagba and the other defendants filed an objection in which they argued that they had obtained the rights to host Africa's Next Top Model from Tyra Banks, the executive producer and host of America's Next Top Model. The objection was dismissed after the defendants were unable to produce a superior title to back up their claims of ownership.

== Judges ==
Judges	Seasons
Judges	1 (2013–2014)
Oluchi Onweagba	Host/head judge
Josie Borain	Main
Remi Adetiba	Main

== Cycles ==
Cycle	Premiere date	Winner	Runner-up	Other contestants in order of elimination	Number of contestants	International Destinations
1	10 November 2013	Aamito Lagum	Opeyemi Awoyemi & Michaela Pinto	Steffi Reti & Marwa Faiza, Safira Mariquele, Omowunmi Wanyonyi, Rhulani Kubayi, Joyce Zi Chidebe, Michelle Allen, Roselyn Ashkar & Cheandre van Blerk	12	New York City

== Contestants per country ==
Cycle	Angola	Ghana	Kenya	Mozambique	Nigeria	South Africa	Tunisia	Uganda
**1**	Michaela Pinto	Roselyn Ashkar	Steffi Reti	Safira Mariquele	Opeyemi Awoyemi; Joyce Zi Chidebe; Omowunmi Wanyonyi	Cheandre van Blerk; Michelle Allen; Rhulani Kubayi	Marwa Faiza	**Aamito Lagum**

- **Bold text** indicates winners
- Italic text indicates runners-up
