= Sarah Houbolt =

Australian Paralympic swimmer

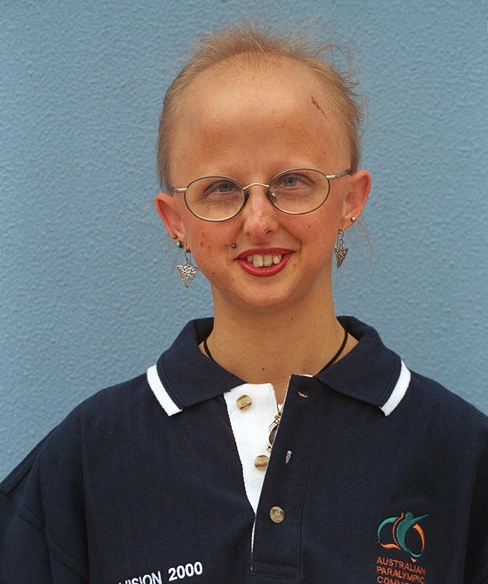
- Sarah Houbolt's portrait for the 2000 Australian Paralympic Team media guide

Personal information
- Born: 1983 (age 42–43) Townsville, Queensland
- Height: 1.44 m (4 ft 9 in)

Sport
- Country: Australia
- Sport: Paralympic swimming
- Disability: Hallermann-Streiff syndrome
- Disability class: S12

Sarah Houbolt is an Australian Paralympic swimmer and a physical theatre performer. She is a strong advocate for disability rights and the arts.

== Personal life ==
Houbolt was born in 1983 in Townsville, Queensland. Houbolt was born with the rare Hallermann-Streiff syndrome which affects her bone structure and makes her stand at 144 centimetres (4.7 feet) tall. She also has partial sight and is legally blind. Houbolt has graduated with Bachelor of Arts and Bachelor of Social Work from the University of Queensland. She has worked in arts management. In 2017, she was working as an Equity and Diversity Officer (Disability) at University of Technology Sydney.

== Sporting career ==
Houbolt classified as an S12 swimmer. She competed at the 1st IBSA World Championships and Games in Madrid, Spain. Her best results were fifth in the Women's 100 m Butterfly and sixth in the Women's 100 m Breaststroke. At the 1999 FESPIC Games in Bangkok, Thailand, she won three gold and one silver medal. At the 2000 Sydney Paralympics, her results were seventh in the Women's 100 m Breaststroke SB12 and eighth in the Women's 100 m Butterfly S12. She also swam in the heats of the Women's 50 m Freestyle S12 and Women 100 m Freestyle S12. After the Sydney Paralympics, she moved in circus and physical theatre events.

== Artistic career ==
After the Sydney Paralympics, she joined the Vulcana Women's Circus as an aerial performer after wanting to keep the active lifestyle. Her skills include aerials, acrobatics and hula hoops. She has worked with Cirque du Soleil. Houbolt's one-woman show, KooKoo the Birdgirl, has toured Australia and New Zealand.

Her film credits include: Romeo and Juliet: A Love Song (2013), Cirque du Soleil: Worlds Away (2012), The Deadly Ponies Gang (2013), Reflections in the Dust (2018), and Three Thousand Years of Longing (2022).

== Recognition ==
- 1998 - Australia Post - Student of the Year Sports Award
- 1998 - Australian Blind Sports Federation - Most Outstanding Single Performance
- 1998/99 - Queen's Trust for Young Australian Achiever Award
- 2012 - National Artistic Achievement Award by Arts Access Aotearoa
- 2017 - Vision Australia Award
- 2019 - Green Room Award - Performance (by an Individual or Ensemble)
