= Idris Elba =

English actor (born 1972)

Sir Idris Elba OBE
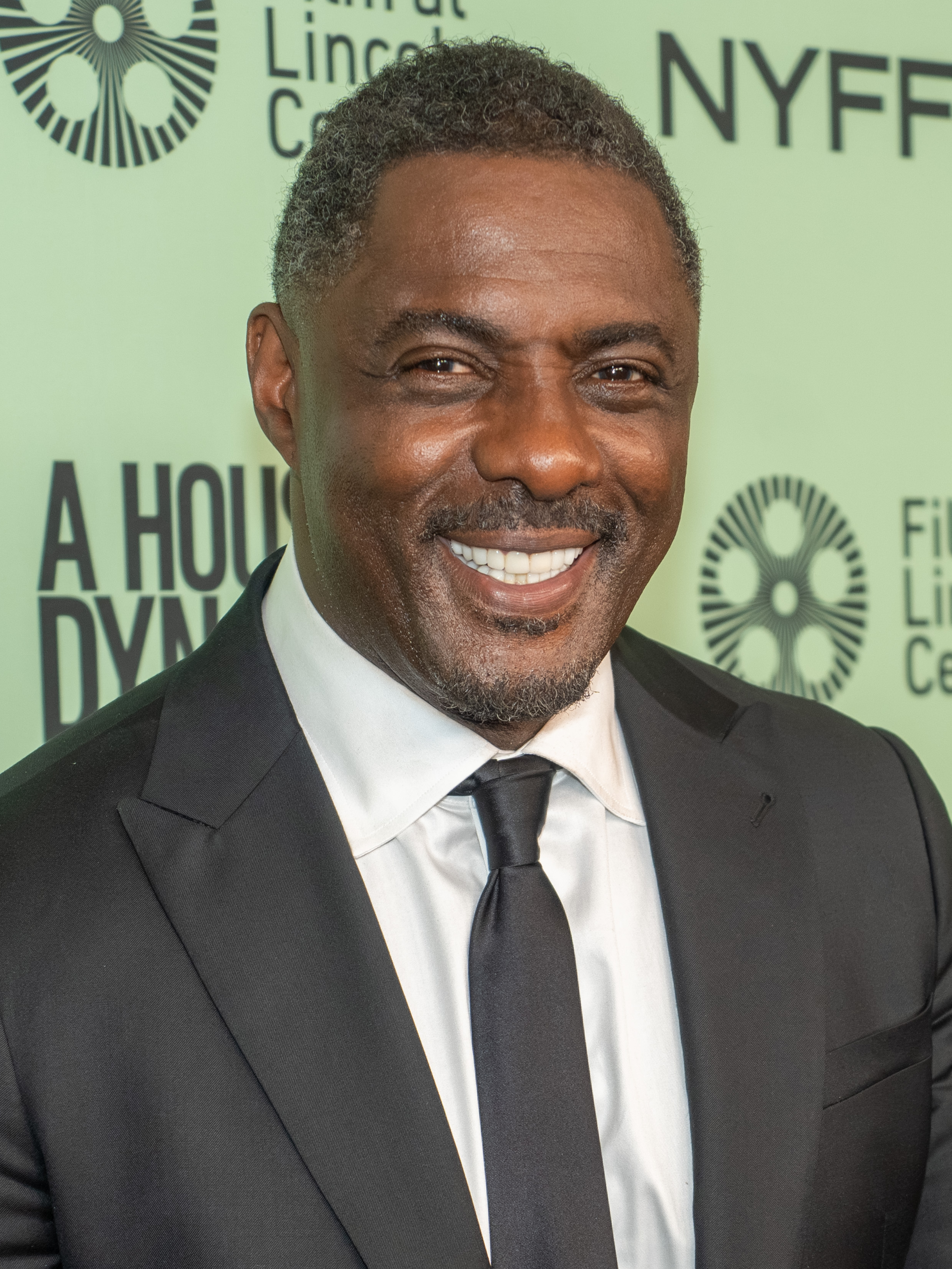
- Elba in 2025
- Born: Idrissa Akuna Elba; 6 September 1972 (age 54); Hackney, London, England
- Other names: DJ Big Driis; Idris
- Citizenship: United Kingdom; Sierra Leone (since 2019)
- Occupations: Actor; DJ; rapper; singer
- Years active: 1994–present
- Works: Filmography
- Spouses: Hanne Nørgaard (m. 1999; div. 2003); Sonya Nicole Hamlin (m. 2006; ann. 2006); Sabrina Dhowre (m. 2019)
- Children: 2
- Awards: Full list
- Musical career
- Genres: Hip hop; R&B; dance; Afro house; Latin house
- Instruments: Vocals; turntables
- Labels: Parlophone; 7Wallace

Sir Idrissa Akuna Elba (/ˈɪdrɪs/ IH-driss; born 6 September 1972) is an English actor, DJ, rapper, and producer. He has received a Golden Globe Award as well as nominations for three BAFTA Awards and eight Primetime Emmy Awards. He was named in the Time 100 list of the Most Influential People in the World in 2016. His films have grossed over US$9.8 billion at the global box office, making him one of the top 20 highest-grossing actors. In 2025, Elba was named as the UK's ninth-most influential Black person in the 2026 Powerlist.

Elba studied acting at the National Youth Music Theatre in London. He rose to prominence playing Tim in Family Affairs, and in the United States playing Stringer Bell in the HBO series The Wire (2002–2004), and DCI John Luther in the BBC One series Luther (2010–2019), the latter of which earned him the Golden Globe Award for Best Actor – Miniseries or Television Film as well as four nominations for the Primetime Emmy Award for Outstanding Lead Actor in a Limited Series or Movie. He was also Emmy-nominated for his guest role in Showtime comedy-drama series The Big C (2011) and for his leading role in Apple TV+ thriller series Hijack (2023). He is also known for his recurring guest role as Charles Miner in the NBC sitcom The Office (2009).

On film, Elba portrayed a ruthless and charismatic warlord in the Netflix drama Beasts of No Nation (2015) for which he received the Screen Actors Guild Award for Outstanding Actor in a Supporting Role as well as nominations for a BAFTA Award and Golden Globe Award. He portrayed Nelson Mandela in Mandela: Long Walk to Freedom (2013) for which he was nominated for the Golden Globe Award for Best Actor in a Motion Picture – Drama. He has also acted in American Gangster (2007), Obsessed (2009), Prometheus (2012), Pacific Rim (2013), Star Trek Beyond (2016), Molly's Game (2017), The Dark Tower (2017), Hobbs & Shaw (2019), The Harder They Fall (2021), Three Thousand Years of Longing (2022) and A House of Dynamite (2025).

Elba joined the Marvel Cinematic Universe (MCU) portraying Heimdall in six films beginning with Thor (2011), as well as the DC Extended Universe playing Bloodsport in The Suicide Squad (2021). He voiced Chief Bogo in Zootopia (2016), Zootopia+ (2022) and Zootopia 2 (2025), Shere Khan in The Jungle Book, Fluke in Finding Dory (both 2016), and Knuckles the Echidna in the Sonic the Hedgehog film series (2022–present), and played Man-At-Arms in Masters of the Universe (2026).

Elba made his directorial debut with Yardie (2018). He also performs as a DJ under the moniker DJ Big Driis or Idris and as an R&B singer. He is a co-owner of the Formula E team, Kiro Race Co.

== Early life and education ==
Idrissa Akuna Elba was born on 6 September 1972 in the London Borough of Hackney, the only child to Winston Elba, a Sierra Leonean man who worked at the Ford Dagenham plant, and Eve, a Ghanaian woman. His parents were married in Sierra Leone and later moved to London. Elba was raised in Hackney and East Ham and shortened his first name to "Idris" while at school in Canning Town, where he first became involved in acting.

Elba credits The Stage with giving him his first big break. After seeing an advertisement for a play, he auditioned and subsequently met his first agent while performing in the role. In 1986, he began helping an uncle with his wedding DJ business; within a year, he had started his own DJ company with some of his friends.

Elba briefly attended Barking and Dagenham College, leaving school in 1988 and winning a place in the National Youth Music Theatre after a £1,500 Prince's Trust grant. To support himself between roles in his early career, he worked in odd jobs including tyre-fitting, cold-calling and night shifts at Ford Dagenham. He worked in nightclubs under the DJ nickname "Big Driis" during his adolescence, but began auditioning for television roles in his early twenties.

== Career ==
=== 1994–2004: Early roles and The Wire ===
Elba's first acting role was in Crimewatch murder reconstructions, and in 1994, he appeared in a BBC children's drama called The Boot Street Band. In 1995, he landed his first significant role on a series called Bramwell, a medical drama set in 1890s England. In an episode of series 1, he played a central character, an African petty thief named Charlie Carter, who lost his wife to childbirth and had to figure out how to support his newborn daughter. His first named role arrived earlier in 1995 when he was cast as a gigolo on the "Sex" episode of Absolutely Fabulous. Many supporting roles on British television followed, including series such as The Bill and The Ruth Rendell Mysteries. He joined the cast of the soap opera Family Affairs and went on to appear on the television serial Ultraviolet and later on Dangerfield. He decided to move to New York City soon afterward. He returned to England occasionally for a television role, such as a part in one of the Inspector Lynley Mysteries. In 2001, Elba played Achilles in a stage production of Troilus and Cressida in New York City. In 1997, he starred in the first two episodes of the second series "Blood, Sweat and Tears" in Silent Witness. After a supporting turn on a 2001 episode of Law & Order, Elba landed a starring role on the HBO drama series The Wire. From 2002 to 2004, Elba portrayed Stringer Bell in the series, perhaps his best-known role in the United States. Elba is also known for playing the character Aaron Smith in the 2003 Jamaican film, One Love.

=== 2005–2019: Luther and stardom ===
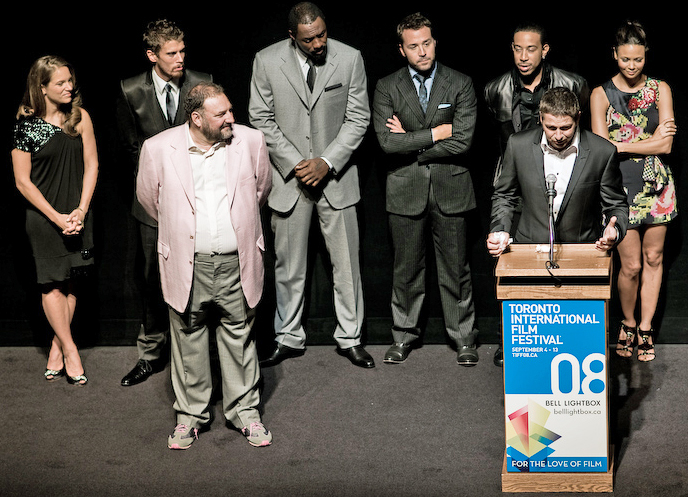
Elba (back row, centre) with the cast of RocknRolla at the 2008 Toronto International Film Festival

In 2005, he portrayed Captain Augustin Muganza in Sometimes in April, an HBO film about the Rwandan genocide. Elba appeared on the 2007 BET special Black Men: The Truth. He appeared as Charlie Gotso on The No. 1 Ladies' Detective Agency, filmed in Botswana. The series premiered on 23 March 2008, Easter Sunday, on BBC One, receiving a high 6.3 million viewers and 27% of the audience share. In January 2009, Variety reported that Elba would portray Charles Miner, a new rival to Dunder Mifflin regional manager Michael Scott (Steve Carell) for NBC's The Office. Elba appeared in a six-episode story arc later in the 2009 season, as well as the season finale. In September 2009, he signed a deal to star as the lead role on the six-part BBC television series Luther, which aired in May 2010. He appeared on Showtime's The Big C in 2010. At the 69th Golden Globe Awards telecast on 15 January 2012, Elba won Best Actor in a Miniseries or Television Film for his role on the BBC crime thriller series Luther.

In 2007, Elba signed on to play the lead role of the film Daddy's Little Girls, playing Monty, a blue-collar mechanic who falls in love with an attorney helping him gain custody of his kids, and finds the relationship and his custody hopes threatened by the return of his former wife. He appeared in 28 Weeks Later (2007) and This Christmas (2007), which brought in nearly $50 million (~$74.7 million in 2025) at the box office in 2007. In 2008, he starred in the horror film Prom Night and the Guy Ritchie London gangster film RocknRolla. In 2009, he starred in the horror film The Unborn and in Obsessed, a thriller that had him cast opposite Beyoncé. The latter was a box office success, taking $29 million in its opening weekend. Elba's next film was Legacy (2010), in which he portrayed a black ops soldier who returns to Brooklyn after a failed mission in Eastern Europe, where he has undertaken a journey looking for retribution. He starred in Dark Castle's adaptation of DC/Vertigo's The Losers, under the direction of Sylvain White, in the role of Roque, the second-in-command of a black-ops team out for revenge against a government that did them wrong. Filming took place in Puerto Rico, and the movie was released in April 2010. Elba appeared in the thriller Takers (2010). He played Heimdall in Kenneth Branagh's film Thor (2011), based on the Marvel Comics superhero of the same name.

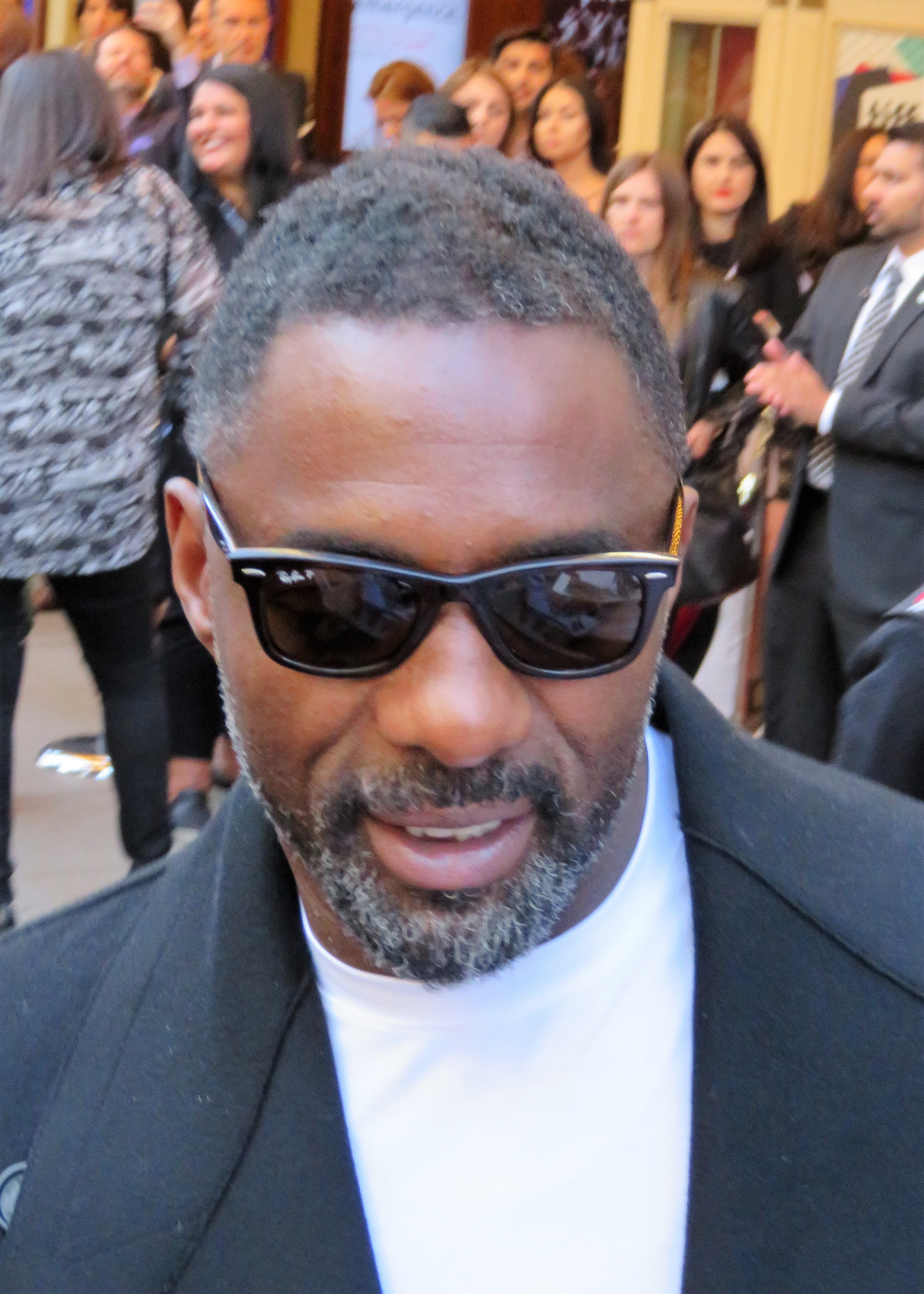
Elba at the premiere of Molly's Game, 2017 Toronto International Film Festival

In August 2010, Elba signed up to portray the title character in a reboot of James Patterson's Alex Cross film franchise. However, in February 2011, he was replaced by Tyler Perry. In Ghost Rider: Spirit of Vengeance (2011), the sequel to Ghost Rider (2007), Elba played an alcoholic warrior monk tasked with finding the title character. In his first video game appearance, Elba voiced the character Truck in the 2011 game Call of Duty: Modern Warfare 3. In February 2012, Elba confirmed that he would portray Nelson Mandela in the film Mandela: Long Walk to Freedom, which is based on his autobiography. As part of his preparation for the role, Elba spent a night locked in a cell alone on Robben Island, where Mandela had been imprisoned. His performance earned him a nomination for the Golden Globe Award for Best Actor – Motion Picture Drama. In June 2012, Elba portrayed the role of Captain Janek in Ridley Scott's Prometheus. He joined the cast of the film Pacific Rim (2013) in the role of Stacker Pentecost. He reprised his role as Heimdall in Thor: The Dark World in 2013. In January 2014, he confirmed that he would be starring in a film adaptation of Luther. In 2014, he starred in No Good Deed as a vengeful psychopathic serial killer.

In 2015, Elba appeared as Heimdall in the superhero blockbuster Avengers: Age of Ultron, directed by Joss Whedon. Elba also starred alongside Abraham Attah in the film Beasts of No Nation, which premiered in select theatres and on Netflix. He earned a Golden Globe Award nomination for Best Performance by an Actor in a Supporting Role in any Motion Picture, as well as a BAFTA Award nomination for Supporting Actor in the Film category. In 2016, he had several voice roles: the cape buffalo chief of police, Chief Bogo, in Disney's Zootopia, alongside Ginnifer Goodwin and Jason Bateman; villainous tiger Shere Khan in The Jungle Book (2016), a live-action adaptation of the animated 1967 film of the same name, directed by Jon Favreau; and sea lion Fluke in Pixar's Finding Dory, alongside Ellen DeGeneres and Albert Brooks. Also that year, he played the main antagonist, Krall, in the sequel Star Trek Beyond.

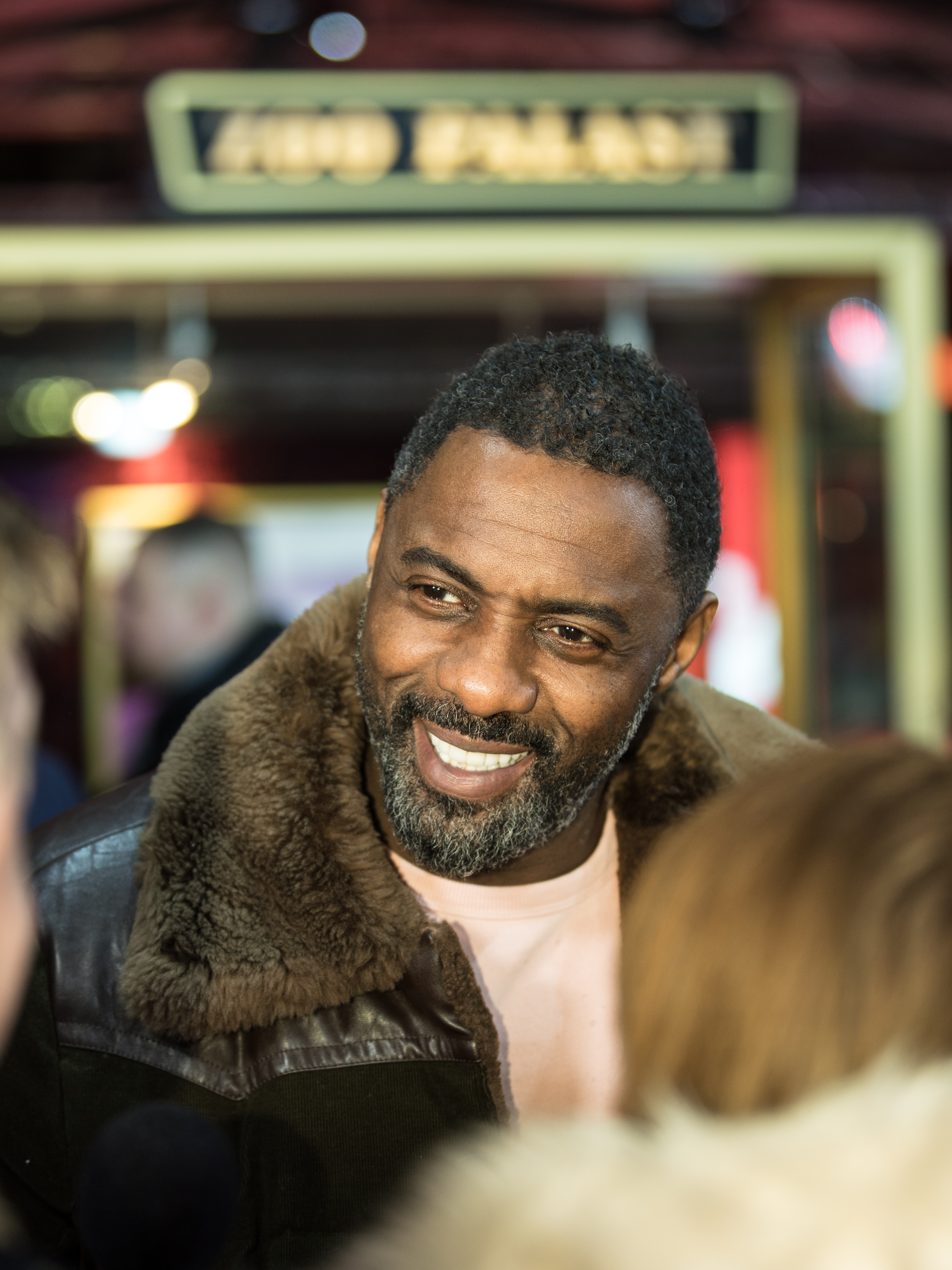
Elba in 2018

In 2017, he played Roland Deschain in the Stephen King film adaptation The Dark Tower, starred in The Mountain Between Us and Aaron Sorkin's directorial debut Molly's Game, alongside Jessica Chastain. In April 2018, it was announced that Elba was cast as Charlie in the Netflix comedy series, Turn Up Charlie. It premiered on 15 March 2019 and was cancelled after one season. He also created and starred in the semi-autobiographical comedy In the Long Run. In 2019, Elba starred as the villain in Fast & Furious Presents: Hobbs & Shaw, a spin-off of Fast & Furious franchise, and played Macavity in Tom Hooper's film adaptation of Andrew Lloyd Webber's musical, Cats.

=== 2020–present: Blockbuster films with Sonic and Zootopia ===
In 2021, Elba portrayed mercenary Robert "Milton" DuBois / Bloodsport in James Gunn's The Suicide Squad. In 2022, Elba was the voice of Knuckles the Echidna in the film Sonic the Hedgehog 2, a sequel to the film Sonic the Hedgehog which is itself based on the franchise of the same name. He reprised the role in a self-titled solo series for Paramount+ and returned for Sonic the Hedgehog 3, both in 2024. Elba provided voice-acting and his likeness to the character Solomon Reed in Phantom Liberty, a 2023 downloadable expansion for CD Projekt Red's 2020 video game Cyberpunk 2077. In 2025, he played both the prime minister of the United Kingdom in Heads of State, and the president of the United States in A House of Dynamite.

On 22 November 2024, Deadline announced he was cast as Duncan/Man-At-Arms in Amazon MGM Studios's film adapation of Masters of the Universe.

== Production company ==
Elba signed a deal with Apple to produce original content through his Green Door Pictures production company. In February 2021, it was reported that the companies of Elba and his wife, Sabrina Dhowre, would be developing an Afrofuturist adult animated sci-fi series, tentatively titled Dantai, for Crunchyroll, which would be about a time when biotech has "created an ever-widening gap between the haves and have-nots." In an April 2021 interview with Den of Geek, he said the series is "mainly the brainchild" of his wife, whom he described as a "super geek when it comes to anime". In June 2024, Elba launched a new production company called 22Summers with former Pulse & BBC exec Diene Petterle. In August 2024, Elba received approval from the Tanzanian government to establish a film studio in Zanzibar. In September 2024, Elba joined Things Fall Apart as an actor and executive producer.

In January 2025, Idris Elba premiered a documentary into knife and gang-related crimes in the United Kingdom.

== Other ventures ==
=== Music ===
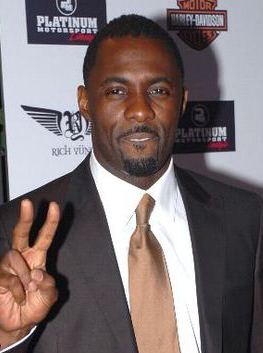
Elba at the American Music Awards in 2007

Elba has appeared in music videos for Fat Joe (2002), Angie Stone (2004) and rapper Giggs (2010). In 2006, he recorded the four-song EP Big Man for Hevlar Records. He co-produced and performed on the intro to Jay-Z's album American Gangster (2007). He DJed at the 2007 NBA All-Star parties at The Venetian and Ice House Lounge in Las Vegas. In July 2009, Elba was the DJ for BET's current series Rising Icons. He announced the release of his first single "Please Be True". In the August 2009 issue of Essence, he announced the title of his six-song EP as Kings Among Kings. He released his EP High Class Problems Vol. 1 in the United Kingdom in February 2010, for which he has won many prizes, including a Billboard Music Awards nomination.

In 2011, he performed on the intro to Pharoahe Monch's album W.A.R.. In the following year, he co-directed and performed in the Mumford & Sons music video for "Lover of the Light". In 2014, he produced K. Michelle's "The Rebellious Soul Musical" which debuted on VH1 on 19 August 2014. In May, Elba featured on Mr Hudson's single "Step Into the Shadows". Mr Hudson also produced his album Idris Elba Presents Mi Mandela, released in November 2014. He also featured on the remix of the Ghanaian music group, VVIP's single "Selfie" together with Nigerian rapper Phyno released on 12 September 2014, and the video was released on YouTube on 11 April 2015.

Elba performed a rap for the second album by Noel Fielding and Sergio Pizzorno's band, the Loose Tapestries. Elba also rapped in a remix of Skepta's "Shutdown" which was uploaded on 1 June 2015 to SoundCloud. On 17 August, a song was released on which Elba appeared on Nigerian singer D'banj's single "Confidential", featuring Sierra Leonean rapper Shadow Boxer with the video uploaded to YouTube on 20 August. In November 2015, Elba opened for Madonna during her Rebel Heart Tour in Berlin, Germany. Elba is also featured on the Macklemore & Ryan Lewis album This Unruly Mess I've Made (2016). He had the idea to develop the music from his album Idris Elba Presents Mi Mandela into a show, which eventually resulted in a play called Tree that premiered at the Manchester International Festival in 2019. However, authorship of the piece was disputed. On 2 July 2019, The Guardian published a story describing how writers Tori Allen-Martin and Sarah Henley said they had been removed from the production under what they described as questionable circumstances. The two writers had worked on the project for four years, following an approach from Elba asking them to develop his idea for a musical based on the album, on which Allen-Martin had also collaborated. Kwame Kwei-Armah joined the project in May 2018, and rewrote part of their material. At the time of its premiere, Tree was billed as "created by Idris Elba and Kwame Kwei-Armah". Allen-Martin and Henley described their creative input as having included research and script-writing, as well as coming up with the play's title, and that after being removed, they were threatened with legal action if they went public with the story. Elba and Kwei-Armah both published rebuttals of what happened on Twitter.

In July 2018, he launched his record label, 7Wallace Music. Elba performed at Coachella Valley Music and Arts Festival in April 2019. In 2019, he featured on the track "Boasty" by British grime artist Wiley. Elba also appears in the "Boasty" music video, delivering his verse in a mansion that includes a film set. In 2019, Elba appears on Taylor Swift's song "London Boy" from her seventh studio album Lover. The intro of the song samples a snippet from an interview by Elba. In April 2020, Elba collaborated with producer Jay Robinson on the track "Know Yourself", released on Mau5trap.

In 2020, after hearing Canadian R&B singer Emanuel's debut single "Need You", Elba reached out with an idea for a music video compiled from clips of people sharing the things that were helping them cope with the COVID-19 pandemic. Elba was credited as the creative director of the video and is being credited as an executive producer of Emanuel's forthcoming full-length debut album. On 13 February 2021, Elba performed a guest DJ mix for Mix Up on Australian national youth broadcaster Triple J. Elba then collaborated with Connor Price on 28 May 2021 on the song "Courteney Cox". On 22 September 2021, Elba announced he would be releasing a collaborative EP with Australian pop rock duo Lime Cordiale titled Cordi Elba, which was released on 14 January 2022. Elba also collaborated with Paul McCartney on a remix of his song "Long Tailed Winter Bird".

On 8 January 2024, Elba released the song "Knives Down" featuring UK rapper DB Maz as a part of his campaign against knife crime in the UK. With the release of the Phantom Liberty downloadable expansion for CD Projekt Red's 2020 video game Cyberpunk 2077, two of three new radio stations introduced feature Elba. These are listed as 107.5 Darkstar Radio and 99.9 Impulse Radio. 107.5 Darkstar introduces two new tracks by Elba ("Choke Hold", "Roller Coaster"), and 99.9 Impulse features an hour-long DJ set by Elba and Private Press. On 24 January 2024, Movement Electronic Music Festival in Detroit announced that Elba would be performing a back-to-back DJ set with veteran EDM DJ and producer Kevin Saunderson in 2024.

In 2024, Idris began his own label "Sound International" inspired by his uncle's legendary 1980s London "Sound System" which had an open-minded approach to music; the label aims to showcase diverse house music talent from around the world, with a goal to sign records from every country, highlighting the global unity and freedom within the house music genre. In 2025, Elba made an appearance on Connor Price's debut album, About Time.

=== Kickboxing ===
Discovery Channel produced a documentary, Idris Elba: Fighter, chronicling Elba's twelve-month kickboxing and mixed martial arts training under Muay Thai coach Kieran Keddle, culminating in Elba's first professional kickboxing fight—and win—against Lionel Graves, a younger, more experienced Dutch opponent, at London's York Hall.

Kickboxing record
Date	Result	Opponent	Event	Location	Method	Round	Time	Record
28 August 2016	Win	(Netherlands) Lionel Graves	Road to Glory UK	London, United Kingdom	TKO	1	N/A	1–0

=== Motorsport ===
On 11 February 2025, it was announced that Elba invested in Kiro Race Co, a team competing in the FIA Formula E World Championship.

== Personal life ==
=== Marriages and family ===
Elba was married to Danish stylist Hanne "Kim" Nørgaard from 1999 until their divorce in 2003. He was then married to American real estate lawyer Sonya Nicole Hamlin for four months in 2006. He has a daughter with Nørgaard and a son with English makeup artist Naiyana Garth. He began a relationship with Canadian model and businesswoman Sabrina Dhowre in early 2017. They became engaged on 10 February 2018, during a screening of his film Yardie at an East London cinema, and were married on 26 April 2019 in Marrakesh.

=== Activism ===
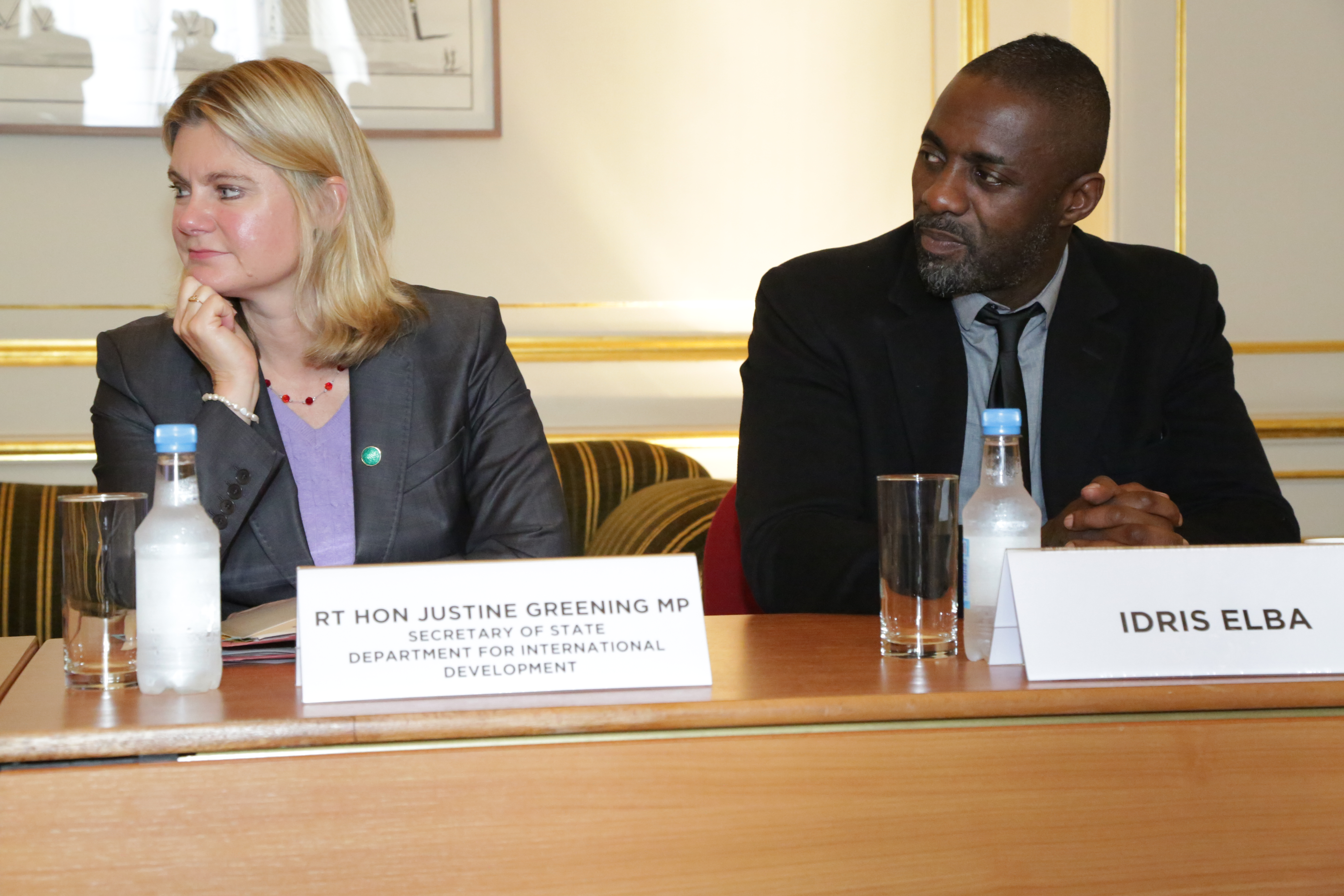
Elba and British cabinet minister Justine Greening at a meeting with diaspora representatives at the "Defeating Ebola in Sierra Leone" conference in London, October 2014

In October 2014, Elba presented the series Journey Dot Africa with Idris Elba on BBC Radio 2, exploring all types of African music. Elba was featured in various television commercials for Sky box-sets in 2013, 2014, 2015, 2016 and 2019. He has collaborated with the UK parliament in their efforts to eradicate Ebola from West Africa, working alongside the UK Secretary of State for International Development Justine Greening in 2014. Elba has created a collaboration with British fashion label Superdry, which launched at the end of November 2015.

In January 2016, Elba addressed the UK parliament regarding the concern of the lack of diversity on screen. He said: "Change is coming but it's taking its sweet time". He spoke about the lack of diversity regarding race, gender and sexuality. The Prince's Trust, a UK youth charity founded by Prince Charles in 1976, which Elba credits with helping begin his career, appointed him as their anti-crime ambassador in April 2009. He served on the Board of Governors of the British Film Institute between 2018 and 2022. He voiced support for a vote to remain in the European Union for the 2016 United Kingdom European Union membership referendum. He is a campaigner against knife crime.

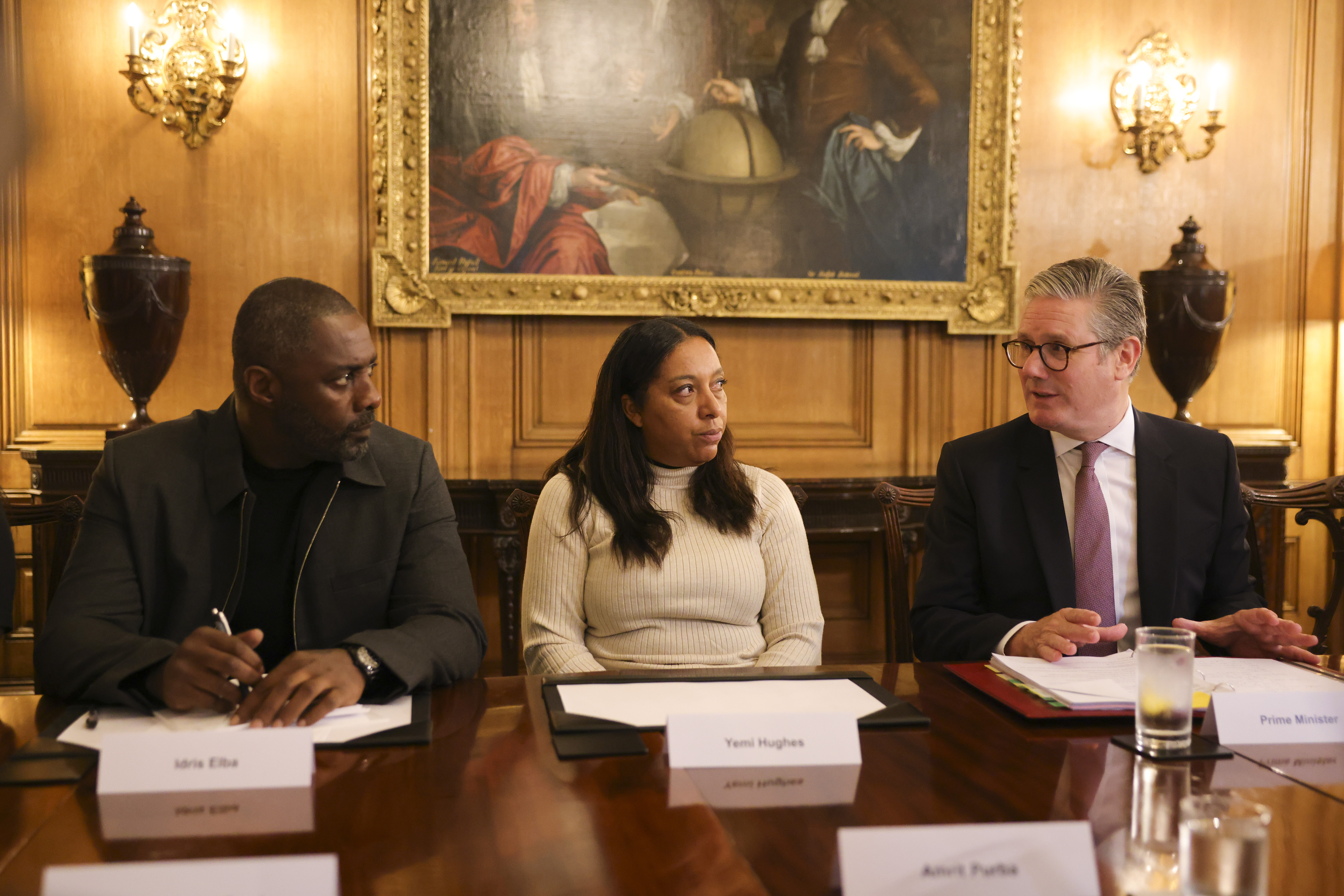
Elba with British prime minister Keir Starmer in 2024

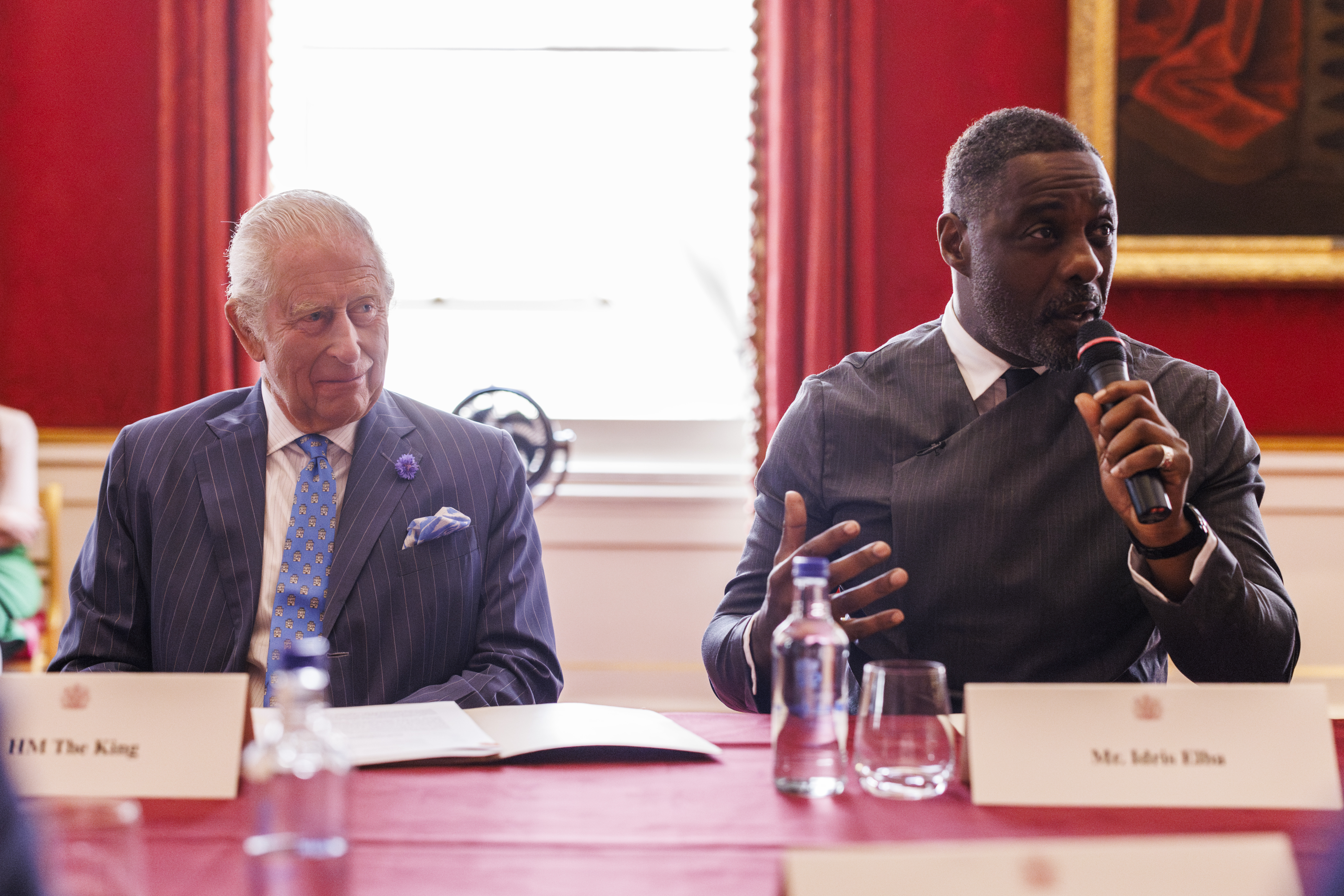
Elba with King Charles III in 2025

Elba attended the UK government's inaugural knife crime summit in 2024, alongside Prime Minister Keir Starmer and Home Secretary Yvette Cooper. Elba emphasized the importance of action over mere discussion, advocating for a wide range of perspectives, including those of parents, youth workers, and law enforcement to address the issue. The summit aimed to unite various community groups, tech companies, sports organizations, and public services in an effort to halve knife crime over the next decade. Elba's Elba Hope Foundation was part of this coalition, which was also focusing on restricting online knife sales and tightening regulations on dangerous weapons. In 2025, he suggested banning "ninja swords" and removing the points from kitchen knives as possible solutions.

=== Interests ===
Elba has said that he is spiritual but not religious. He is a lifelong supporter of his local football team Arsenal. In January 2025, he revealed that he had stopped eating meat around six months prior.

In 2015, as part of his Discovery Channel miniseries Idris Elba: No Limits, Elba broke the land speed record for the Pendine Sands "Flying Mile" course. He hosted The Best FIFA Football Awards at the London Palladium on 23 October 2017, during which he took a selfie of "the best team in the world" which included Lionel Messi, Cristiano Ronaldo and Neymar.

In a 2019 podcast, Elba said that he was trying to quit social media because it made him depressed.

Elba has discussed his experience with dyslexia making it difficult to read scripts, which led him to help develop a tool that allows for audio script reading.

== Filmography ==
Idris Elba first rose to prominence on television, playing the financially astute Baltimore drug trafficker Russell "Stringer" Bell on the HBO crime drama The Wire (2002–2004) and the brilliant but self-destructive detective DCI John Luther on the BBC One series Luther (2010–2019), the latter earning him a Golden Globe Award and four Emmy nominations. His other television work includes a recurring role as Charles Miner on the NBC sitcom The Office (2009), the lead in the Apple TV+ thriller Hijack (2023), and the comedy series In the Long Run (2018–2020), which he created and produced. On film, his most acclaimed roles include the warlord Commandant in Beasts of No Nation (2015), for which he won a Screen Actors Guild Award, and the title role in Mandela: Long Walk to Freedom (2013) which earned him a Golden Globe nomination; he is also widely known as Heimdall across the Marvel Cinematic Universe (2011–2022). His other notable films include 28 Weeks Later (2007), American Gangster (2007), Prometheus (2012), Pacific Rim (2013), Star Trek Beyond (2016), Molly's Game (2017), The Dark Tower (2017), Fast & Furious Presents: Hobbs & Shaw (2019), The Suicide Squad (2021), The Harder They Fall (2021), and A House of Dynamite (2025). He has also done voice work in films including Zootopia (2016), The Jungle Book (2016), and the Sonic the Hedgehog films (2022, 2024), and made his feature directorial debut with Yardie (2018). In video games, he played the spy Solomon Reed in Cyberpunk 2077's expansion Phantom Liberty (2023), a performance nominated for Best Performance at The Game Awards.

== Awards, honours and recognition ==
Elba was named Essence's annual Sexiest Man of the Year in 2013 and People's Sexiest Man Alive in 2018. In October 2014, he was presented with a MOBO Inspiration Award. As of May 2019, his films have grossed over $9.8 billion at the global box office, including over $3.6 billion in North America, where he is one of the top 20 highest-grossing actors.

He was appointed an Officer of the Order of the British Empire (OBE) in the 2016 New Year Honours 'for services to drama'. In 2017, he won the male title for the "Rear of the Year" award in Britain. In September 2018, he was one of 50 people named for "making London awesome" and helping to shape London's cultural landscape, as part of Time Out's 50th anniversary. In the 2020 and 2021 editions of the Powerlist, he was listed in the top 100 most influential people in the UK of African/Afro-Caribbean descent.

In December 2022, Elba was awarded an honorary Doctor of Arts degree from Ravensbourne University London in recognition of his work championing diversity within the creative industries and beyond.

Elba was knighted in the 2026 New Year Honours "for services to young people" in May 2026 by King Charles III, and is now formally known as Sir Idris Elba.

== Discography ==
Albums

- 2015: Murdah Loves John (The John Luther Character Album)

Extended plays

- 2006: Big Man
- 2009: Kings Among Kings
- 2010: High Class Problems Vol. 1
- 2014: Idris Elba Presents Mi Mandela
- 2022: Cordi Elba (with Lime Cordiale)
- 2023: The Phantom Files (from Cyberpunk 2077)

Singles

Title	Year	Album
"Pushing On" (as IDRIS with Kathy Brown)	2024	Non-album singles
"Shake Body" (as IDRIS, with Shermanology)	2024	Non-album singles

- 2023: "We Run the Area" (with Toddla T, General Levy and Naomi Cowan)
- 2023: "Most Wanted" (with Djibril Cissé)
- 2024: "Knives Down" (with DB Maz)

Remixes

- "Trust in Me"
- "The Bare Necessities"

Mixtapes

- 2011: Merry DriisMas Holiday Mixtape
- 2024: Essential Mix

Other appearances

- 2019: "Even If I Die (Hobbs & Shaw)" on the soundtrack to the Fast & Furious spin-off film Hobbs & Shaw, featuring Cypress Hill; the remix version features Hybrid.
- 2019: "London Boy" by Taylor Swift — The intro of the song samples a snippet from an interview by Elba.
- 2019: "Party & BullShit" by Sarkodie – He was featured in the song.
- 2020: "Fear or Faith Pt. 2" by Future Utopia from the album 12 Questions.
- 2021: "Long Tailed Winter Bird (Idris Elba Remix)" by Paul McCartney from the album McCartney III Imagined.
- 2025: "More Mentors" by Connor Price from the album About Time

Featured singles

Title	Year	Peak chart positions		Certifications	Album
Title	Year	UK	AUS	Certifications	Album
"Dance Off" (Macklemore & Ryan Lewis featuring Idris Elba and Anderson .Paak)	2016	—	7	ARIA: Platinum	This Unruly Mess I've Made
"Boasty" (Wiley, Stefflon Don and Sean Paul featuring Idris Elba)	2019	11	—	BPI: Platinum	Non-album singles
"Come Alive" (Wrenne featuring Idris Elba)	2019	—	—		Non-album singles
"New Breed" (James BKS featuring Q-Tip, Idris Elba and Little Simz)	2019	—	—		Non-album singles
"Courteney Cox" Connor Price featuring Idris Elba)	2021	—	—		Non-album singles
"Apple Crumble" (with Lime Cordiale)	2021	—	—		Cordi Elba
"What's Not to Like" (with Lime Cordiale)	2021	—	—		Cordi Elba
"Holy Moley" (with Lime Cordiale)	2022	—	—		Cordi Elba
"Unnecessary Things" (with Lime Cordiale)	2022	—	—		Cordi Elba
"Vroom" (The FaNaTIX featuring Idris Elba, Lil Tjay, Davido, Koffee & Moelogo)	2022	—	—		Find Your Line – Official Music from Gran Turismo 7
"More Mentors" (Connor Price featuring Idris Elba)	2025	—	—		About Time
"—" denotes a recording that did not chart or was not released in that territory.
