= J. Mendel =

French-American luxury fashion house

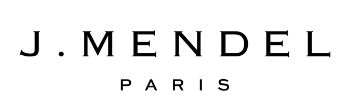

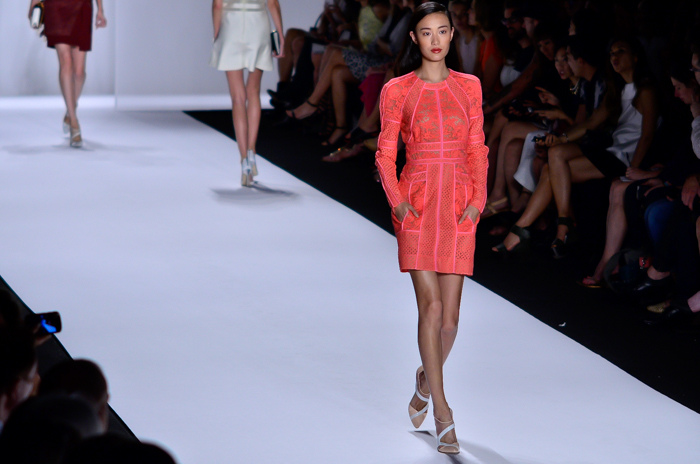
- J. Mendel, SS 2014 runway
- Type: Private
- Industry: Fashion
- Founded: 1870; 156 years ago in St. Petersburg, Russia
- Founder: Joseph Mendel
- Key people: Gilles Mendel
- Products: Furs, outerwear, evening wear
- Services: Fashion retail
- Owner: Mendel family, Stallion Inc.
- Website: jmendel.com

J. Mendel is a French-American luxury fashion house. J. Mendel was founded in St. Petersburg and was originally a furrier. Today, the company produces fur garments, evening wear, outerwear and accessories.

== History ==
In 1870, Joseph Mendel founded a J. Mendel, an eponymous fur atelier in St. Petersburg. Mendel reportedly was a furrier to the house of Romanov. After the Russian Revolution, Joseph Mendel's son Jacques Mendel emigrated to Paris, bringing the brand with him.

The company continued to produce fur outerwear in Paris under the leadership of Jacques Mendel and then later, through his son, also known as Jacques Mendel. In 1981, Gilles Mendel, a fifth-generation descendent of the company's founder, opened an atelier in New York. Gilles Mendel became the company's lead designer and would extend the brand beyond outerwear.

In the 1990s, when growing numbers of American consumers turned against wearing furs, Mendel began designing dresses. The gowns soon became popular, leading Mendel to launch a clothing collection.

=== Fashion lines ===
In 2002, the company launched a ready-to-wear line. The company exhibited its collections at New York Fashion week, releasing shows for Spring, Bridal, Resort, Pre-Fall and Fall collections. The company became known for their evening wear and for clothing that utilized fur accents.

In 2016, J. Mendel launched a couture collection. The 2016 couture collection is the only couture collection the house has released to date. The company continues to specialize in lightweight fur accessories and evening wear.

Mendel's evening wear designs have been worn by celebrities at key occasions. Taylor Swift has worn J. Mendel at the Time 100 and Met Galas and Melania Trump appeared in J. Mendel for official functions as First Lady of the United States. In 2015, Actress Bridget Moynahan wore custom J. Mendel for her wedding.

=== Ownership ===
In 2010, a controlling interest in the company was purchased by The Gores Group. In 2011, the company closed its Chicago flagship store. In 2013, Gores was looking for an additional partner in the company. In 2015, a majority stake was sold to Stallion, Inc. In 2018, J. Mendel was under six different lawsuits for unpaid bills, relating to unpaid office space, advertising and materials. In June, the company filed for Chapter 11 protection in bankruptcy court. In December 2018, Stallion Inc. acquired a majority stake in the business. After the company's bankruptcy, Gilles Mendel no longer is involved in the company's business dealings, but continues to support the label creatively.
