= Three Thousand Years of Longing =

2022 film by George Miller

- Theatrical release poster
- Directed by: George Miller
- Screenplay by: George Miller; Augusta Gore
- Based on: "The Djinn in the Nightingale's Eye" by A. S. Byatt
- Produced by: Doug Mitchell; George Miller
- Starring: Idris Elba; Aska Karem; Matteo Bocelli; Aamito Lagum; Sarah Houbolt; Lachy Hulme; Tilda Swinton
- Cinematography: John Seale
- Edited by: Margaret Sixel
- Music by: Tom Holkenborg
- Production companies: FilmNation Entertainment; Elevate Production Finance; Sunac Culture; Kennedy Miller Mitchell
- Distributed by: Metro-Goldwyn-Mayer Pictures (through United Artists Releasing; North America); Roadshow Entertainment (Australia)
- Release dates: May 20, 2022 (Cannes); August 26, 2022 (United States); September 1, 2022 (Australia)
- Running time: 108 minutes
- Countries: United States; Australia
- Language: English
- Budget: $60 million
- Box office: $20.3 million

Three Thousand Years of Longing is a 2022 romantic fantasy drama film directed and produced by George Miller. Written by Miller and Augusta Gore, it is based on the 1994 short story "The Djinn in the Nightingale's Eye" by A. S. Byatt and follows a djinn (Idris Elba) who is unleashed from a bottle by a professor (Tilda Swinton) and tells her stories from his thousands of years of existence. The film stars Idris Elba, Aska Karem, Matteo Bocelli, Aamito Lagum, Sarah Houbolt, Lachy Hulme, and Tilda Swinton. The film is dedicated to Miller's mother Angela, as well as Rena Mitchell, relative of producer Doug Mitchell.

The film premiered out of competition at the 75th Cannes Film Festival on May 20, 2022. It was released theatrically in the United States on August 26, 2022, by Metro-Goldwyn-Mayer Pictures (via United Artists Releasing), and in Australia on September 1, 2022, by Roadshow Entertainment. It received generally positive reviews from critics, who praised its visuals and performances, but was a box-office bomb, grossing $20.3 million against a budget of $60 million.

== Plot ==
Alithea Binnie is a British narratology scholar who occasionally hallucinates demonic beings. During a trip to Istanbul, Alithea purchases an antique Çeşm-i Bülbül (nightingale's eye) bottle and unleashes the Djinn trapped within it. The Djinn offers to grant Alithea three wishes, as long as each one is truly her heart's desire, with the following exceptions: no wishing for more wishes, no wishing for immortality, and no wishing for an end to sin or suffering. However, Alithea argues that wishing is a mistake, accusing the Djinn of being a trickster. She says that when she was a child, she created an imaginary friend in the form of a young boy and even imagined his whole life (which she wrote in a diary) but decided to forget about him, fearing to be overwhelmed by her own imagination. In response, the Djinn proceeds to tell her three tales of his past and how he ended up trapped in the bottle.

In the first story, the Queen of Sheba, the Djinn's kin and lover, is wooed by King Solomon, who jealously imprisons the Djinn in a brass bottle which is cast into the Red Sea by a bird. Twenty-five centuries later the now-encrusted bottle is brought up from the ocean floor by fishermen and eventually is used as a stone in a wall.

The second story centers on Gülten, a concubine in the palace of Suleiman the Magnificent. After finding the bottle, Gülten wishes for Suleiman's son, Mustafa, to fall in love with her and subsequently wishes to bear his child. Hürrem Sultan, a favored concubine of Suleiman, schemes to have her own son on the throne and convinces Suleiman that Mustafa is conspiring against him; this results in Mustafa's murder. Despite the Djinn's attempts to save her, the pregnant Gülten is also killed on Suleiman's orders before she can make her final wish.

With the third wish ungranted, the Djinn wanders the palace invisibly for over 100 years, his bottle concealed beneath a stone in an unused bathing room. He almost captures the attention of Murad IV, who goes to war and becomes a ruthless ruler, later dying from alcoholism. His brother Ibrahim becomes the new sultan with a developed fetish for overweight concubines. His favorite among them, Sugar Lump, after finding the bathing room while wandering through the palace, discovers the bottle when she slips and falls on the stone, breaking it. The Djinn appears to her and desperately begs her to make the third wish. Thinking he is a trickster, Sugar Lump wishes for the Djinn to be re-imprisoned in his bottle at the bottom of the Bosporus.

In the final story, Zefir, the third wife of a Turkish merchant, is given the bottle after it is recovered in the mid-19th century from the belly of a gutted fish. Zefir wishes first for all-reaching knowledge, which the Djinn grants in the form of books, and later to perceive the world as djinns do. Despite the Djinn's growing love for Zefir and the fact she is now pregnant with his child, she feels increasingly trapped by his unwillingness to let her make a third wish, which would end their bond. To placate her, the Djinn offers to imprison himself in a new glass bottle whenever she wishes. However, during one such time, Zefir wishes to forget she had ever met the Djinn, leaving him imprisoned and unknown once again.

Alithea is moved by the story and realizes that she has fallen in love with the Djinn. For her first wish she asks for him to love her the way he had loved Zefir. They spend the night making love, and in the morning, the Djinn accompanies Alithea back to London. They settle into a routine where he either accompanies her as she works, or explores the new modern world, learning all of the new technological discoveries.

One day, Alithea discovers that the Djinn is becoming weaker due to the effects of the city's cell tower and satellite transmissions, which have been interacting with his electromagnetic physiology. Finding him turning to dust and comatose, she uses her second wish to get the severely ill Djinn to speak to her, and apologizes for using her wish to deny them the chance to fall in love naturally. She uses her third and final wish to free the Djinn to return to "The Realm of Djinn" where he belongs, as she realizes he does not belong in the world of humans.

Three years later, Alithea has written a book containing all the stories that the Djinn told her, like she once did with her childhood imaginary friend, and sees the now-healthy Djinn approaching her from across the park. Holding hands, they continue through the park and Alithea's narration reveals that he promises to return throughout her lifetime.

== Cast ==
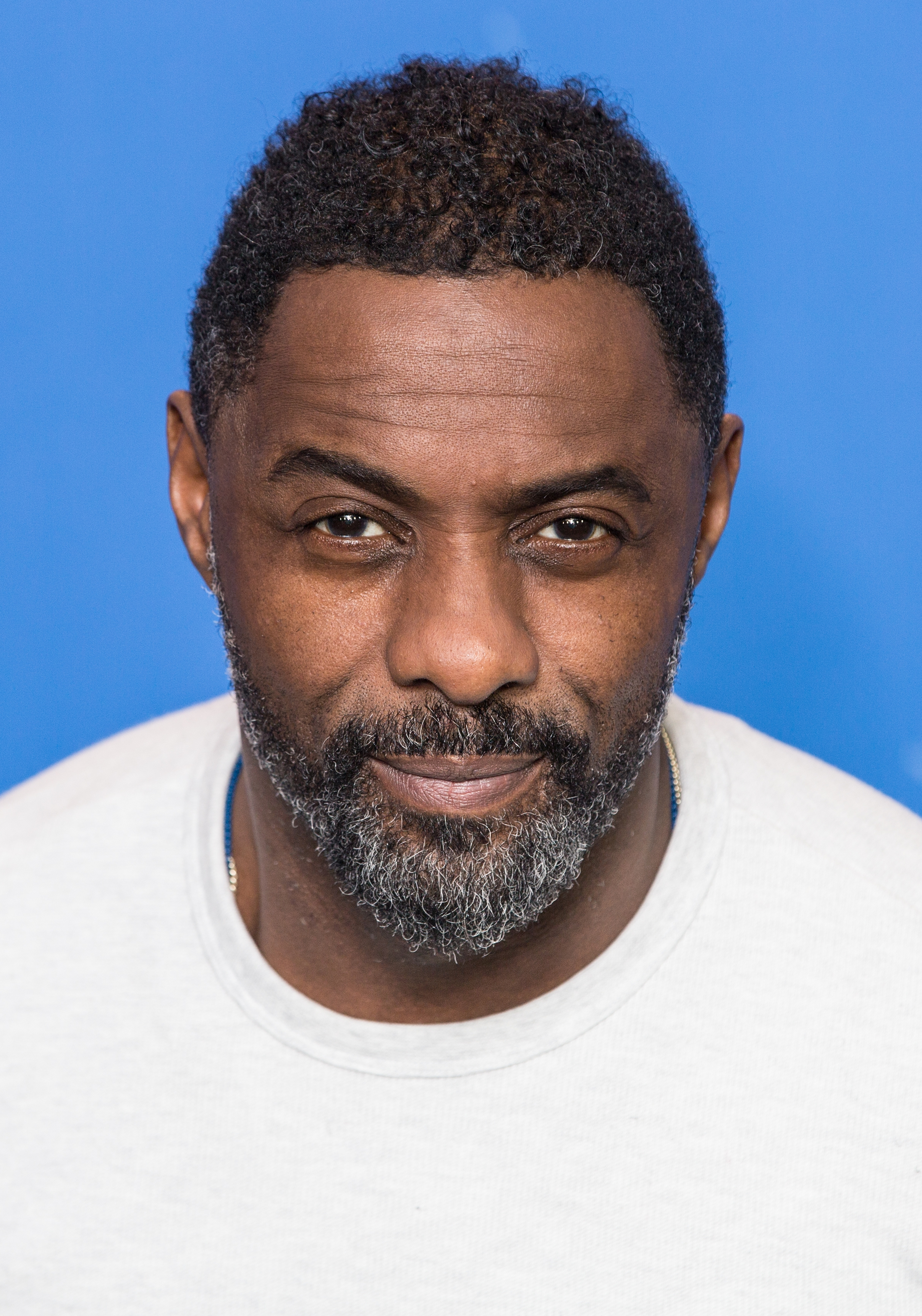
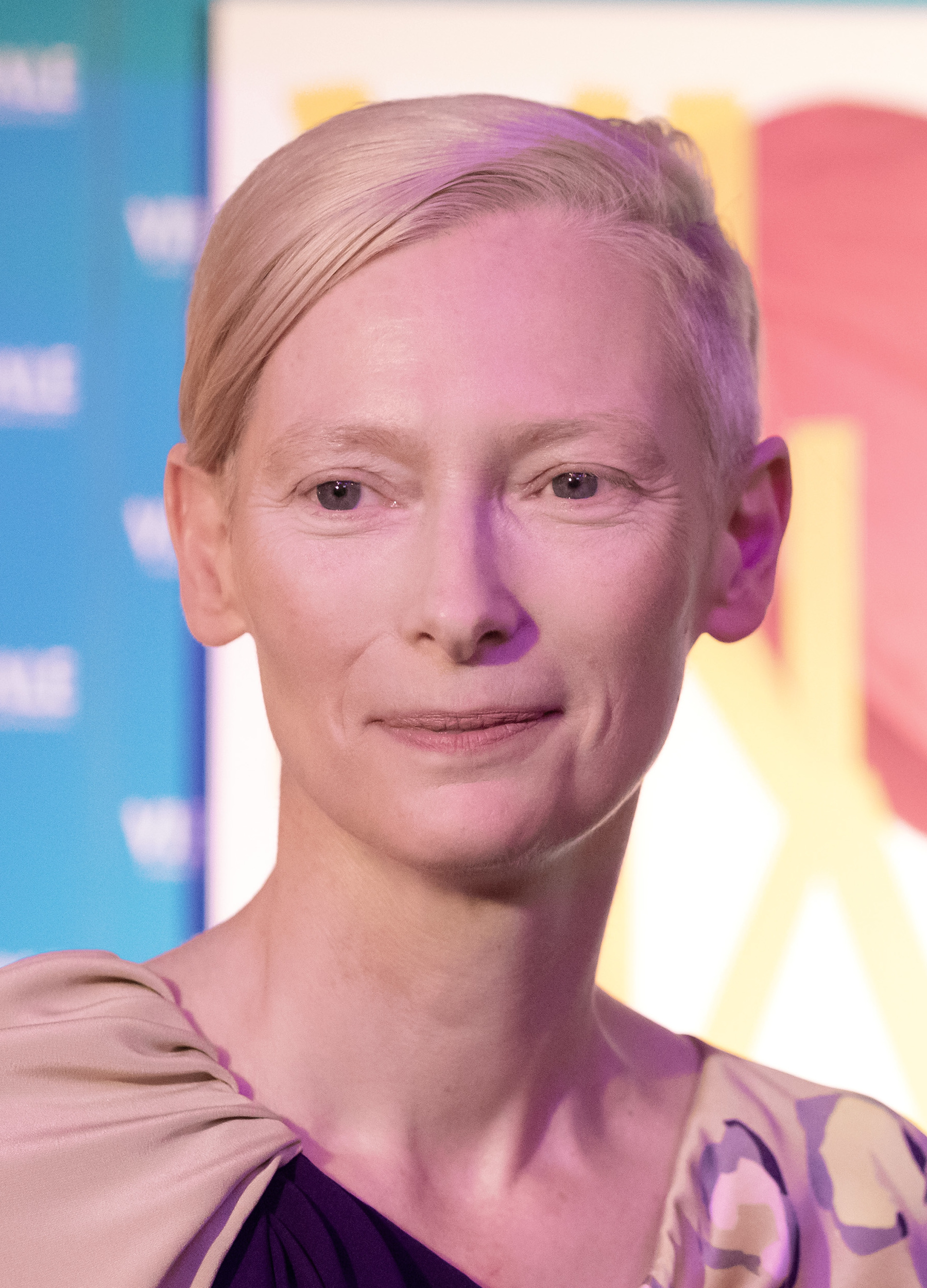
The film stars Idris Elba and Tilda Swinton.
- Tilda Swinton as Alithea Binnie
  - Alyla Browne as young Alithea Binnie
- Idris Elba as the Djinn
- Aska Karem as airport Security officer
- Erdil Yaşaroğlu as Professor Günhan
- Sarah Houbolt as airport Djinn
- Aamito Lagum as the Queen of Sheba
- Sabrina Dhowre as the British Council Lady/The Watcher
- Nicolas Mouawad as King Solomon
- Ece Yüksel as Gülten
- Matteo Bocelli as Prince Mustafa
- Lachy Hulme as Sultan Suleiman
- Megan Gale as Hürrem
- Oğulcan Arman Uslu as Murad IV
  - Kaan Guldur as young Murad
- Jack Braddy as Ibrahim
  - Hugo Vella as young Ibrahim
- Zerrin Tekindor as Kösem
- Anna Adams as Sugar Lump
- George Shevtsov as the old storyteller
- David Collins as Ozmet the Jocular
- Burcu Gölgedar as Zefir
- Vince Gil as old merchant
- Melissa Jaffer as Clementine
- Anne Charleston as Fanny
- Danny Lim as storyteller with dog
- Quaden Bayles as Quick Change Boy
- Lulu Pinkus as Old Merchant Wife

== Production ==
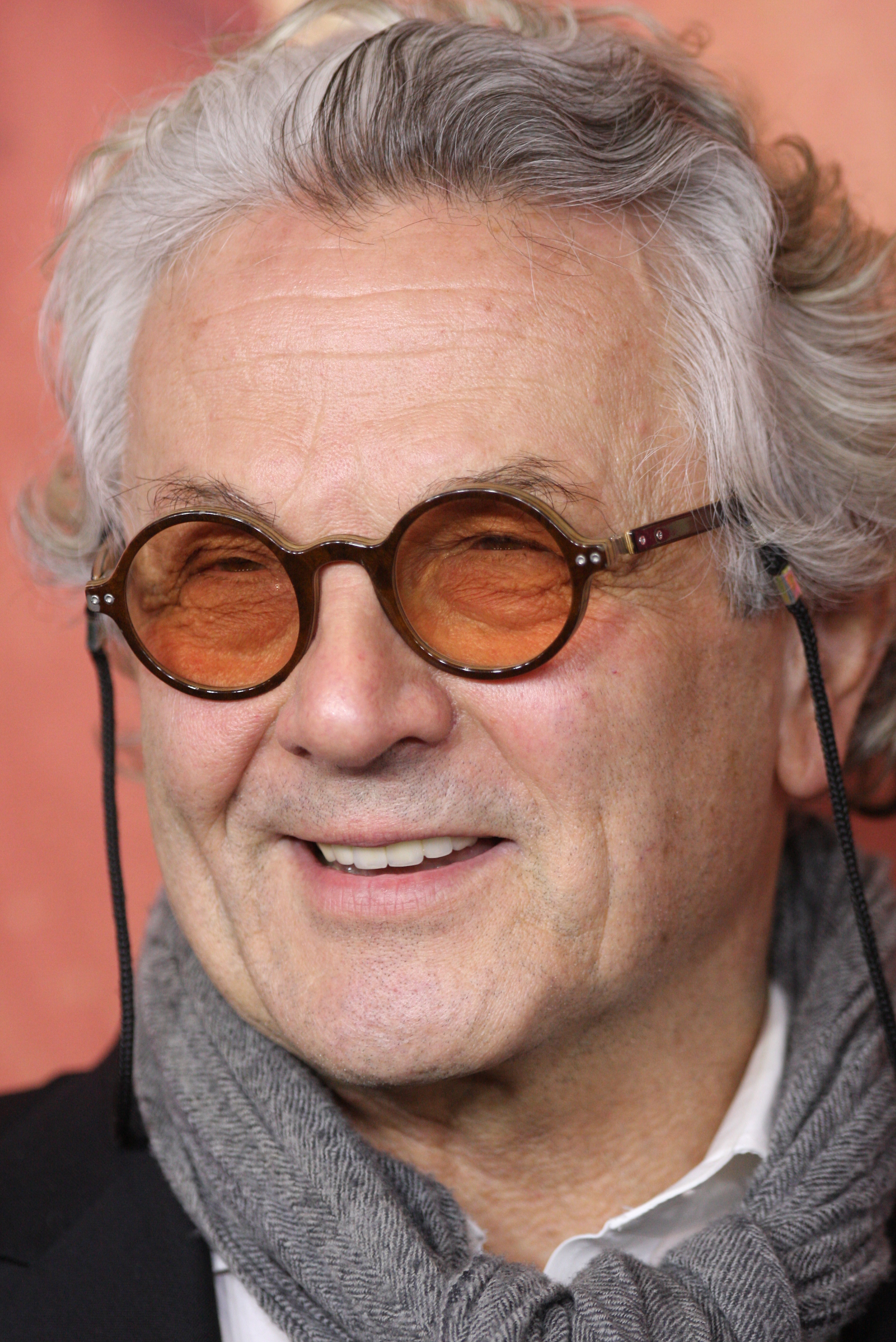
Director, co-writer and co-producer George Miller.

It was announced in October 2018 that George Miller had set his next directorial effort, described as "epic in scope" and expected to begin filming in 2019. Idris Elba and Tilda Swinton were announced as cast members the same month. The film is based on A. S. Byatt's short story "The Djinn in the Nightingale's Eye".

In a July 2019 interview, Miller said that pre-production would begin in late 2019, and that filming would begin on March 2, 2020, between Australia, Turkey and the United Kingdom. Filming was delayed due to the COVID-19 pandemic and began in November 2020 in Australia.

== Release ==
In May 2020, MGM (via United Artists Releasing) acquired the film's North American distribution rights, with Metropolitan Filmexport and Sunac Culture handling distribution in France and China respectively. Roadshow Entertainment handled the Australian distribution, while Entertainment Film Distributors handled distribution in the United Kingdom.

The film premiered out of competition at the 75th Cannes Film Festival on May 20, 2022, where it received a six-minute standing ovation. The film's first trailer was also released that day.

The film's scheduled release date of August 31, 2022, in the United States, was moved up to August 26. It was released in Australia on September 1, 2022.

Metro-Goldwyn-Mayer and Warner Bros. Home Entertainment released the film for VOD on November 1, 2022, followed by a Blu-ray, DVD and 4K UHD release on November 15, 2022.

== Reception ==
=== Box office ===
Three Thousand Years of Longing grossed $8.3 million in the United States and Canada, and $12 million in other territories, for a worldwide total of $20.3 million, against a production budget of $60 million.

In the United States and Canada, it was released alongside The Invitation and Breaking. It made $1.4 million on its first day and went on to debut with $2.9 million from 2,436 theaters on its opening weekend. Variety called it "a terrible result for a movie that's playing in thousands of theaters across the country", and noted that it would be one of the biggest box office bombs of 2022, with industry experts blaming lack of marketing and the wide-release strategy. TheWrap, while acknowledging its box office underperformance, noted the film could still turn a profit for MGM after it went to streaming, as the company spent only $6 million on domestic distribution rights. In its second weekend, the film made $1.5 million (and a total of $1.9 million over the four-day Labor Day frame), dropping 47.1% and finishing 13th.

=== Critical response ===
On the review aggregator website Rotten Tomatoes, 71% of 260 critics' reviews are positive, with an average rating of 6.5/10. The website's consensus reads: "Although its story isn't as impressive as its visual marvels, it's hard not to admire Three Thousand Years of Longing's sheer ambition." Metacritic, which uses a weighted average, assigned the film a score of 60 out of 100, based on 52 critics, indicating "mixed or average" reviews. Audiences polled by CinemaScore gave the film an average grade of "B" on an A+ to F scale.

Peter Debruge of Variety said: "These days, audiences are so savvy about the tricks at a filmmaker's disposal that the movie's greatest achievement is that it seizes our imagination (or perhaps that's our attention deficit disorder being so brusquely manhandled) and holds it for the better part of two hours, defying us to anticipate what comes next."

James Cameron-Wilson of Film Review Daily said: "... technical wizardry ... is sublimely put to use to conjure up the ancient worlds of Ottoman splendour and the ethereal dimensions of the genie – the Djinn. ... the film ... is a CGI blitzkrieg, albeit a hugely seductive one. A hallucinogenic, mentally-stirring experience, it is likely to confound and entrance in equal measure, and unlikely to leave the viewer's brain in a hurry. It is, however, more of a visual and verbal pleasure than an emotionally engaging one."

Xan Brooks, writing in The Guardian, said the film "is a consciously unfashionable fantasy about a wary academic and a chatty genie that may leave you wishing for more" and "is guileless, open-hearted, like an antiquarian bookseller's dream of The Thief of Baghdad. It's so defiantly out of step with fashion that there's finally something faintly glorious about it."
