= The Djinn in the Nightingale's Eye =

Short story collection by A. S. Byatt

- First edition
- Author: A. S. Byatt
- Published: 1994
- Publisher: Chatto & Windus (UK); Random House (US)
- ISBN: 0-679-42008-8

The Djinn in the Nightingale's Eye is a 1994 collection of five mythical short stories by British novelist A. S. Byatt. The collection includes two short stories, "The Glass Coffin" and "Gode's Story", originally published in the novel Possession, as well as the titular story, "The Djinn in the Nightingale's Eye", which was published in The Paris Review.

The stories included in The Djinn in the Nightingale's Eye adopt many of the conventions of folk or fairy tales to examine contemporary society with many of the common themes in Byatt's work. The novella-length title story is highly intertextual, including a "rich collage of fairy tale motifs", referencing folk tales from One Thousand and One Nights, the works of Geoffrey Chaucer and William Shakespeare, the Epic of Gilgamesh, and the myth of Cybele.

The Djinn in the Nightingale's Eye was published with woodcut illustrations. Reviews of the book were generally positive.

Writer-director George Miller's 2022 film Three Thousand Years of Longing is based on the title story of this collection.
