= Boasty =

Single by Wiley, Stefflon Don and Sean Paul featuring Idris Elba
- Released: 22 January 2019
- Genre: Dancehall
- Length: 2:57
- Label: BMG
- Songwriters: Richard Cowie; Stephanie Allen; Sean Paul; Idris Elba; Reynard Bargmann; Thomas Mackenzie Bell
- Producers: Mucky; Toddla T

Wiley singles chronology
"Remember Me" (2018)	"Boasty" (2019)	"My One" (2019)

Stefflon Don singles chronology
"Shot & Wine" (2019)	"Boasty" (2019)	"Scared of Love" (2019)

Sean Paul singles chronology
"Shot & Wine" (2019)	"Boasty" (2019)	"Contra La Pared" (2019)

Idris Elba singles chronology
"Dance Off" (2016)	"Boasty" (2019)	"Come Alive" (2019)

"Boasty" is a song by British rappers Wiley and Stefflon Don and Jamaican rapper Sean Paul featuring vocals from English actor and musician Idris Elba. It was originally released by Wiley featuring Mucky in August 2018, and remixed for release with contributions from Stefflon Don, Paul and Elba in January 2019. It reached number 11 on the UK Singles Chart in March 2019. A solo version of the track was released on the rapper's 14th studio album, Boasty Gang – The Album, which was released on 22 June 2020.

== Music video ==
The music video, directed by Henry Scholfield, was released in March 2019, featuring Stefflon Don, Paul and Elba, with a young actor, Brooklyn Appiah, appearing in place of Wiley. Idris Elba delivers his verse in a mansion that includes a film set. Scholfield said that he wanted the video to feel like a competition between the artists "competing for lyrical screen-space" to give the "vibe of bigupmanship and a visual riff on who's the boasty-iest".

== Charts ==
=== Weekly charts ===
Chart (2019)	Peak position
Ireland (IRMA)	82
Scottish Singles Sales (Official Charts)	31
UK Singles (Official Charts)	11
UK Indie (Official Charts)	1
UK Hip Hop/R&B (Official Charts)	5
US Rhythmic Airplay (Billboard)	35

=== Year-end charts ===
Chart (2019)	Position
UK Singles (Official Charts Company)	50

== Certifications ==
Region	Certification	Certified units/sales
New Zealand (RMNZ)	Gold	15,000^{‡}
United Kingdom (BPI)	Platinum	600,000^{‡}
^{‡} Sales+streaming figures based on certification alone.
