= Oluchi Onweagba =

Nigerian model

- Born: 1 August 1980 (age 46); Lagos, Nigeria
- Occupation: Model
- Spouse: Luca Orlandi (m. 2006)
- Children: 2, including Ugo
- Modeling information
- Height: 6 ft 0 in (1.83 m)
- Hair color: Black
- Eye color: Brown
- Agency: DNA Model Management (New York); Storm Model Management (London)

Oluchi Onweagba-Orlandi // (born 1 August 1980) is a Nigerian model based in New York City. She grew up in the suburbs of Lagos and won "The Face of Africa" contest at the age of 16.

== Early life ==
Onweagba (a native of Isuikwuato, Abia State) grew up in the suburbs of Lagos, Nigeria, with her two brothers and sisters. She is the daughter of a civil servant father and mother who was a nurse.

=== Discovery ===
Onweagba was urged by a family friend to enter the M-Net "Face of Africa" preliminary screening at the M-Net office in Victoria Island, Lagos, in the year 1997. The agency groomed her to be one of Nigeria's entrants for the 1998 competition (rebranded as the Nokia Face of Africa). This despite the fact that, growing up, she had maintained a relative ignorance towards fashion and modeling. With the support of her family and friends, she decided to compete in the inaugural edition of the Face of Africa in 1998. This was the first-ever continent-wide model competition, organized by the South African channel M-Net in collaboration with Elite Model Management. She won the competition and moved to New York shortly after.

== Career ==
After moving to New York City, she began appearing in editorials for American and Italian Vogue, Harper's Bazaar, Marie Claire, Allure, Nylon and W. Onweagba has appeared on the covers of Italian Vogue, Elle, i-D, Pop, Untold, and Surface.

She has walked the runway for Gucci, Carolina Herrera, John Galliano, Missoni, Tommy Hilfiger, Chanel, Bottega Veneta, Christian Dior, Alessandro Dell'Acqua, Jeremy Scott, Helmut Lang, Fendi, Anna Sui, Givenchy, Kenzo, Giorgio Armani, Céline, Nina Ricci, and Diane Von Furstenberg.

She has appeared in advertising campaigns for Gianfranco Ferré, Lancôme, Ann Taylor, Clinique, Bergdorf Goodman, Nordstrom, Macy's, Banana Republic, Gap, Express, L'Oreal, Coca-Cola, as well as working for Victoria's Secret in print walking for six years in the annual Victoria's Secret Fashion Show.

She has worked with notable photographers such as Steven Meisel, Nick Knight, David LaChapelle, and Patrick Demarchelier.

Beyond modeling, Onweagba tries to serve as a role model for other aspiring talents in Nigeria, especially young girls. She volunteers her time and her image for such NGOs as LEAP Africa (an entrepreneurship incubator) and NIPRO. She also is continuing her higher education, having studied for an associate degree in the New York City educational system.

After her three-year contract with Elite expired, Onweagba signed with DNA Model Management. She has appeared in the Sports Illustrated Swimsuit Issue three times.

In 2016, she was named the ambassador of Scent of Africa together with Marcel Desailly.

In 2008, she launched a modeling agency in South Africa, OModel Africa, with offices in Johannesburg and Cape Town. The 2008 winner of M-Net Face of Africa, Kate Tachie-Menson, was awarded a US$50,000 modeling contract by OModel Africa. She was made the host and head judge of Africa's Next Top Model in 2013.

== Personal life ==
Onweagba's first name comes from the Igbo language and means "God's work".

In 2006, Onweagba married Italian fashion designer and long time friend Luca Orlandi. They have two sons and reside in New York. Their son, Ugo Ugochukwu, was the 2020 FIA European junior karting champion, and won the Formula Three World Drivers' Championship in 2026 with Campos Racing.
