= No Good Deed (2014 film) =

- Theatrical release poster
- Directed by: Sam Miller
- Written by: Aimée Lagos
- Produced by: Will Packer; Lee Clay
- Starring: Idris Elba; Taraji P. Henson; Leslie Bibb; Kate del Castillo; Henry Simmons
- Cinematography: Michael Barrett
- Edited by: Randy Bricker
- Music by: Paul Haslinger
- Production companies: Screen Gems; Will Packer Productions
- Distributed by: Sony Pictures Releasing
- Release date: September 12, 2014; (United States)
- Running time: 84 minutes
- Country: United States
- Language: English
- Budget: $13.2 million
- Box office: $54.3 million

No Good Deed is a 2014 American psychological thriller film directed by Sam Miller and written by Aimée Lagos. The film stars Idris Elba, Taraji P. Henson, Leslie Bibb, Kate del Castillo, and Henry Simmons. The film was released on September 12, 2014.

Despite negative critical reception, the film was a box office success and received two Image Award nominations, winning one for Taraji P. Henson's performance.

== Plot ==
Colin Evans has been sentenced to prison for 15 years for manslaughter in the state of Tennessee. He is eligible for parole after five years, and during his parole hearing, Colin claims he is a changed man and has been rehabilitated; but the parole board denies his release, claiming that he is not trustworthy enough, and is sent back to prison for another five years until the next hearing. On returning to prison, Colin kills the correctional officers transporting him and escapes with the van.

In Atlanta, Terri Granger is a stay-at-home mother. Her best friend Meg suggests a "girls' night" to cheer Terri up after her husband Jeffrey abruptly leaves for a family visit, as she knows Terri's relationship with Jeffrey has been suffering.

Colin stalks his ex-fiancée Alexis and witnesses her meeting another man at an outdoor cafe. Colin follows her home where they argue violently, resulting in him murdering Alexis. Later that day, Colin loses control of his car and crashes into a tree during a storm. Walking down the road, he notices Terri's house. He asks her if he can use her phone for a tow truck. Apprehensive at first, she decides to help him, and eventually invites him inside. Meg later arrives and is shocked by Colin's presence.

When Terri leaves momentarily to comfort her baby, Meg and Colin are left alone; Colin excuses himself for a cigarette break, but Meg follows him. Colin suggests he is having an affair with Terri, but Meg does not believe him. As she begins to call out to Terri, Colin quickly grabs a shovel and bashes Meg in the head with it, killing her.

As Terri returns, Colin tells her that Meg left, but Terri is suspicious, especially when she sees Meg's umbrella on the stand. Alarmed, she rushes to the kitchen to call the police, only to find out that Colin has cut all the wires and hidden all her knives. Colin then cuts the power. Terri rushes into her daughter Ryan's bedroom to find Colin playing with her and she sees his concealed handgun in his back. As they exit the bedroom, Terri sprays and hits him with a fire extinguisher, making him fall down the stairs. She runs to get her children, but Colin has recovered. He tells her to return the children to their rooms and reveals a gun. In a brief moment where she strikes him unconscious, she manages to flee to her home office and dials 911 for help. Colin recovers and discovers her in the office. She begs him to leave, explaining that the police are coming and that his blood is all over her kitchen (because she managed to cut him earlier). Colin forces her to take the children into her vehicle and drive away with him. While leaving the garage, Terri sees Meg's dead body on the floor.

Colin makes Terri drive to Alexis' house, and introduces Terri to his dead ex-fiancée. The high winds from the storm cause Terri's car alarm to activate; worried that the noise will attract attention, Colin ties her up while he goes to check on the car. Terri answers Alexis' phone as it starts to ring and is surprised to hear Jeffrey, who is calling Alexis to find out why she has not arrived at the hotel for a rendezvous with him. Terri realizes that he was not out of town with his father and has been having an affair with Alexis. She also realizes that her encounter with Colin was not coincidental as he wants revenge on Jeffrey because of his affair with Alexis. Terri tells her husband the truth and has him call 911. She misleads Colin into thinking that she and her children have escaped. When Colin finds her, she attacks him, grabbing his gun and shooting him until he falls out of a window.

The police arrive with Jeffrey; he apologizes to Terri about his affair, but she punches him in the face and leaves him afterward. Sometime later, a much more confident Terri returns to her career and has moved into a new house with her children, accompanied by a nanny bearing a resemblance to Meg.

== Cast ==
- Idris Elba as Colin Evans
- Taraji P. Henson as Terri Granger
- Leslie Bibb as Meg, Terri's friend
- Kate del Castillo as Alexis, Colin's ex-fiancée
- Henry Simmons as Jeffrey Granger, Terri's husband
- Mark Smith as EMT
- Wilbur Fitzgerald as Dr. Ross
- Mirage Moonschein as Ryan Granger, Terri and Jeffrey's daughter

== Production ==
Filming of No Good Deed began in April 2012 in Atlanta, Georgia.

== Release ==
No Good Deed was initially set to be released on October 18, 2013. In January 2013, Screen Gems announced the film would be moved to open on January 17, 2014, at the beginning of the MLK Holiday weekend. This date conflicted with another Will Packer-produced film, Ride Along, a Universal Pictures release that stars Ice Cube and Kevin Hart. For this reason, in April 2013, the studio pushed back No Good Deed's release date for a second time to April 25, 2014. Yet again, in early October 2013 (and giving no specific reason), Screen Gems for a third time pushed backed the release date of the film to September 12, 2014. Sony Pictures Releasing debuted the first official trailer for the film on June 12, 2014. No Good Deed was released on Blu-ray and DVD on January 6, 2015.

== Reception ==
=== Box office ===
No Good Deed was released on Friday, September 12, 2014. The film was #1 at the domestic box office over the 3-day weekend, grossing $24,250,283 at 2,175 North American theaters ($11,150 per theater average). The film was producer Will Packer's third #1 film of 2014, following Ride Along and Think Like a Man Too. No Good Deed grossed $54,323,210 worldwide.

=== Critical response ===
Rotten Tomatoes gives the film an approval rating of 13% based on reviews from 56 critics. The site's consensus reads, "Dull, derivative, and generally uninspired, No Good Deed wastes its stars' talents -- and the audience's time." Metacritic gives the film a weighted average score of 26 out of 100 based on 17 critics, indicating "generally unfavorable reviews". The audience for No Good Deed was 60 percent female, 59 percent over the age of 30; filmgoers polled by CinemaScore Gabe the film an average grade of "B+" on an A+ to F scale.

== Soundtrack ==
No Good Deed

Soundtrack album by Paul Haslinger
- Released: September 9, 2014
- Genre: Score
- Label: Madison Gate Records

Screen Gems and Madison Gate Records released the soundtrack to the film No Good Deed digitally and physically on September 9, 2014. The 15-track album contains the film's original score composed by Paul Haslinger.

"No Good Deed offered a great opportunity to re-explore a style of score I had first developed for the film Vacancy; music designed to enhance psychological qualities in the telling of a story, in this case, a rather dark one. My personal preference for this kind of approach is to mix classic film noir elements with music, sound-design elements; sometimes alternating, sometimes superimposing them. The goal ultimately was to connect the headspace of the characters with that of the audience, to make the audience feel the threads of the story as they watch it unfold. Working off great performances by Idris Elba and Taraji P. Henson, this was a unique and rewarding project to be involved with!" - Paul Haslinger.

All music is composed by Paul Haslinger.

No.	Title	Music	Length
1.	"On This Day"	Paul Haslinger	2:19
2.	"The Parole Hearing"	Paul Haslinger	1:24
3.	"The Accident"	Paul Haslinger	1:15
4.	"Leaving For The Weekend"	Paul Haslinger	1:14
5.	"Watching Alexis"	Paul Haslinger	0:59
6.	"17 Creston Lane"	Paul Haslinger	1:01
7.	"It Is All A Game"	Paul Haslinger	2:31
8.	"At The Door"	Paul Haslinger	1:21
9.	"Please Come Home"	Paul Haslinger	1:21
10.	"We Have To Leave"	Paul Haslinger	1:54
11.	"The Traffic Stop"	Paul Haslinger	2:49
12.	"Why Are You Doing This?"	Paul Haslinger	1:31
13.	"Your Girlfriend Is Dead"	Paul Haslinger	2:42
14.	"Fight For Life"	Paul Haslinger	1:24
15.	"Terri's New Beginnings"	Paul Haslinger	2:03
Total length:			26:29

== See also ==
- List of films featuring home invasions
