= Lanigan =

Lanigan may refer to:

== Places ==
- Lanigan, Saskatchewan, a town in Saskatchewan
- Lanigan Airport, an airport in Saskatchewan
- Lanigan Creek, a river in Saskatchewan

== People ==
- John Lanigan (disambiguation)
- Ernest Lanigan
- Mike Lanigan
- Jim Lanigan
- Thomas Lanigan-Schmidt
- Lucas Lanigan
- Mick Lanigan
- Jimmy Lanigan
- Damian Lanigan
- Paddy Lanigan
- Mathew Lanigan

== Other ==
- Lanigan's Rabbi
- Lanigan's Ball
- Rahal Letterman Lanigan Racing
