= Beverly Rudd =

British television and theatre actress

- Born: United Kingdom
- Occupations: Actress and narrator
- Years active: 2006–present

Beverly Rudd is a British television and theatre actress and narrator. She rose to prominence playing the role of Tina in the BBC Three sitcom Massive. She won a Royal Television Society award for her work on the show. She later joined the cast of comedy sketch show Scallywagga. From 2011 until 2018 Rudd played the regular role of Lisa in the Sky One comedy drama Trollied. Aside from television work the actress has concentrated on her theatre work and has appeared in numerous stage productions.

== Career ==
Rudd completed her training with London Academy of Music and Dramatic Art. Her early on-screen credits include Marie in the Channel 4 comedy drama No Angels, Gussie in ITV's drama Octavia and Dawn in Lindy Heymann's Coming Up film Service. In 2008, Rudd joined the cast of BBC Three sitcom Massive playing Tina. The show also starred Carl Rice and Faye McKeever. In 2009, Rudd won the "Best Performance in a Comedy" accolade at the Royal Television Society North West Awards.

In 2010, Rudd joined the cast of the BBC comedy sketch show Scallywagga during the second season, which also starred Rice. She later appeared in Coronation Street as Brigitte and Shameless as Liz.

In 2011, the actress joined the cast of the Sky One comedy drama Trollied, playing Lisa. The character is a rude checkout assistant who is not committed to her job role. The show also starred Rudd's Massive co-stars Rice and McKeever. In addition Rudd and Rice's characters Lisa and Colin were a romantic double act throughout the show's tenure. The show remained on-air until 2018 when Sky decided to end the show.

Rudd has often concentrated on theatre work and her acting credits include The Twits at the Curve Theatre, Dead Dog In A Suitcase for an international tour and The Hole Story tour with Paines Plough. Rudd also appeared in James And The Giant Peach at the West Yorkshire Playhouse and Much Ado About Nothing at the Royal Exchange Theatre. At the Regent's Park Open Air Theatre she has performed in Peter Pan, The Beggars Opera and Into The Woods. She played roles in the musical Soho Cinders at the Soho Theatre, The Little Mermaid at the Bristol Old Vic Theatre, The Magistrate which was televised live at the National Theatre Company, Days Of Significance at the Tricycle theatre and Titus Andronicus at the Paradoxos Theatre. She also toured the UK in the Kneehigh production of Tin Drum.

== Filmography ==
Year	Title	Role	Notes
2006	No Angels	Marie	Guest role
2006	Service	Dawn	Guest role
2008	Octavia	Gussie	Guest role
2008	Massive	Tina	Regular role
2009	Mad, Bad & Sad	Receptionist	Film
2009	Comedy Showcase	Katie	Guest role
2010	Scallywagga	Kirsty	Recurring role
2010	Inn Mates	Kaney	Guest role
2011-2018	Trollied	Lisa	Regular role
2011	Coronation Street	Brigitte	Guest role
2011	Him & Her	Anita	Guest role
2012	Shameless	Liz	Guest role
2012	National Theatre Live: The Magistrate	Popham	Televised theatre
2012	Comedy Showcase	Gillian Lawson	Guest role

== Awards and nominations ==
Year	Format	Association	Category	Nominated work	Result
2009	Television	RTS North West Awards	Best Performance in a Comedy	Massive	Won
