= Faye McKeever =

English actress

- Born: 18 January 1985; Liverpool, England
- Occupation: Actress
- Years active: 2006–present
- Notable work: Trollied; Massive; The Moorside; Little Boy Blue
- Height: 1.63 m (5 ft 4 in)
- Partner: Shayne Ward (2003–2014)

Faye McKeever (born 18 January 1985 is an English actress. Her notable works include playing Linda in Sky 1 sitcom Trollied, Marie in Massive and Claire Olssen in Little Boy Blue.

== Career ==
McKeever first rose to prominence in 2006 playing Donna Marie in the spin-off series Hollyoaks: In The City. This was McKeever's first major television role. In 2008, she landed a role as Lou in Torn Up Tales which first aired on 2 June 2008 on BBC Three. Later on in 2008, McKeever played the role, Marie, in Massive on BBC Three again in September and October. Whilst on the set, she was acting with Carl Rice, Lorraine Cheshire and Beverly Rudd, all actors on the cast of Trollied. In 2009, she appeared on ITV's Unforgiven as Hannah Whelan. She then featured in the 6th episode of Season 3 of The Street, playing Hannah. She played Susan in the 8th episode of the 7th season of Shameless. McKeever's first appearance in 2011 came on Sky 1's Mount Pleasant as a checkout girl. Her second TV appearance came on Trollied as Linda in August 2011, which she portrayed until the show's end in 2018. In February 2017, she appeared in the two-part drama series, The Moorside based on the Kidnapping of Shannon Matthews and in April 2017 she appeared in Little Boy Blue, a show based on the murder of Rhys Jones. In 2024, she played Louise Miller, the mother of Ruby Sunday in the Doctor Who story "Empire of Death".

== Filmography ==
Film and television roles
Year	Title	Role	Notes
2006	Hollyoaks: In The City	Donna Marie	2 episodes
2008	Torn Up Tales	Lou	TV movie
2008	Massive	Marie	6 episodes
2009	Unforgiven	Hannah Whelan	TV mini-series, 3 episodes
2009	The Street	Hannah	1 episode: "Loss of Control"
2010	Shameless	Susan	Series 7, 1 episode
2010	A Passionate Woman	Fairground woman	TV mini-series, 1 episode
2011	In with the Flynns	Smoker woman	1 episode: "The Hardest Cut"
2011	Mount Pleasant	Checkout girl	1 episode
2011–2018	Trollied	Linda Stubbings	Main role, 65 episodes
2015	No Offence	Michelle Webb	Series 1, 1 episode
2016	Holby City	Melissa Peters	1 episode: "Where We Belong"
2017	The Moorside	Petra Jamieson	Two-part BBC drama mini-series
2017	Broken	Caroline Powell	3 episodes
2017	Little Boy Blue	Claire Olssen	Four-part ITV drama mini-series
2017	Overshadowed	Louise	TV mini-series, 2 episodes
2018	Pond Life	Tracey Collett	Film
2019	Moving On	Sue	Series 10, episode 4: "A Walk in My Shoes"
2019	A Confession	Deborah Peach (Debs)	ITV mini-series (6 episodes)
2020	Des	Linda Jay	ITV mini-series
2020	Death in Paradise	Danielle Mackenzie	1 episode
2022	The Responder	Jodie	Main cast
2023	The Reckoning	Alison	BBC/ITV mini-series, 3 episodes
2023	Time	Tanya	BBC miniseries
2024	After the Flood	Kelly	ITV series
2024–2025	Doctor Who	Louise Alison Miller	2 episodes
2025	Adolescence	Erica	1 episode

== Personal life ==
She had been in a relationship with singer and The X Factor winner Shayne Ward since 2003 and was engaged to him on their 9th anniversary in September 2012. He proposed to McKeever whilst having dinner at the restaurant at the OXO Tower in London, United Kingdom. In January 2014, the couple ended their relationship, not stating any reasons.
