= Carl Rice =

British actor from Liverpool (born 1980)

- Born: 1980 (age 45–46); Liverpool, England, UK
- Occupation: Actor

Carl Rice (born April 1980) is a British actor from Liverpool. He has appeared in programmes such as Brookside, Brassic and Jimmy McGovern's Hearts and Minds.

== Early life ==
In 1980, Rice was born in Liverpool, England. Rice attended St Joseph's R.C High School in Widnes, Cheshire.

== Career ==
Rice first appeared on screen at the age of eight in a late 1980s advert for milk. The advert famously proclaimed "Accrington Stanley, Who Are They?"

Following this, he appeared in other advertisements. He also starred alongside Tony Robinson for three years on Channel 4's Storyworld, Children's Ward for 2 series, Brookside for one year playing Gavin Matthews and numerous TV shows including Jimmy McGovern's Hearts and Minds alongside Christopher Eccleston and Willy Russell's Terraces alongside Mark Womack.

In 1999, Rice made his stage debut in Guiding Star, a play by Jonathan Harvey that was premiered at the Everyman Theatre, Liverpool before transferring to the Royal National Theatre for a 10-month run. Rice was shortlisted for a Laurence Olivier Award for his performance as Liam Fitzgibbon.

In 2000, he played Rene Montandon in Monsignor Renard, an ITV drama set in Nazi-occupied France, starring John Thaw, Dominic Monaghan and Juliette Caton.

=== 21st century ===
==== 2000s ====
He starred in two series of the comedy sketch show Scallywagga on BBC Three playing over fifty characters. He starred in comedy series Massive on BBC Three playing Shay Finnegan alongside Johnny Vegas, Ralf Little, Joel Fry, Christine Bottomley and Craig Parkinson.

==== 2010s ====
In February 2011, he guest-starred on Shameless, playing Mimi Maguire's long-lost transgender sister, Bobbi Hepburn. In August 2011, Rice started filming on the Sky comedy Trollied. Rice played Colin, a lazy supermarket worker who has appeared in every episode. In 2012, he also appeared in the feature film Papadopoulos & Sons, in which he played Dave, a gardener to a wealthy Greek family. Rice also filmed a guest lead in Holby City in December 2011.

Rice starred in Good Cop in 2012. Good Cop was a dark, RTS Award-winning drama for BBC1 written by Stephen Butchard and directed by Sam Miller (Luther). Rice played Philip Davenport, one of the regular police in the series and worked alongside Warren Brown, Mark Womack, Stephen Graham, Stephen Walters and Kerrie Hayes.

Rice has shot a series each year of Trollied and completed filming on Series 6 in July 2016. He appeared in eight episodes of Coronation Street from late 2015 to early 2016. Rice appeared in two episodes of Stan Lee's Lucky Man alongside James Nesbitt. Rice guest starred in Jimmy McGovern's Moving On in 2016 (Series 8).

Rice starred in the ITV drama Deep Water alongside Anna Friel and Sinead Keenan. He has appeared in every series of Brassic, playing Ronnie Croft and returns for Brassic's final 2025 series, series 7.

== Filmography ==
Year	Title	Role	Notes
1995 and 2015	Casualty	Nathan Cowan	
2011–2018	Trollied	Colin	
2012	Good Cop	PC Phil Davenport	
2012	Papadopoulos & Sons	Dave the Gardener	
2012	Benidorm	Danny	S5, E5
2014	Cuckoo	Terry	
2015	Coronation Street	Ian Rigby	
2016	Stan Lee's Lucky Man	Sol	
2016	Moving On	Wilko	
2017	Doctors	Pete Blake	
2018	Damned	Darren	
2019–2025	Brassic	Ronnie Croft	
2021	Cruella	Viking Gala Security Guard #2	
