= List of Trollied episodes =

Trollied is a British television sitcom created by Anne Marie O'Connor, Paul Doolan and Ash Atalla, and broadcast on Sky One. The series centres on the staff of Valco, a fictional supermarket in Warrington, Cheshire. The series' cast includes Jane Horrocks, Jason Watkins, Mark Addy, Stephanie Beacham, Miriam Margolyes, Stephen Tompkinson, Sarah Parish and Sally Phillips.

During the course of the programme, 71 episodes of Trollied aired, including six specials over seven series, between 4 August 2011 and 23 December 2018.

== Series overview ==
Series
| Series | Episodes | Originally released | |
| Series | Episodes | First released | Last released |
|---|---|---|---|
| 1 | 8 | 4 August 2011 | 15 September 2011 |
| 2 | 13 | 31 August 2012 | 16 November 2012 |
| 2 | Special | 24 December 2012 | |
| 3 | 13 | 22 August 2013 | 7 November 2013 |
| 3 | Special | 24 December 2013 | |
| 4 | 8 | 3 November 2014 | 22 December 2014 |
| 5 | 8 | 2 November 2015 | 14 December 2015 |
| 5 | Special | 23 December 2015 | |
| 6 | 7 | 7 November 2016 | 12 December 2016 |
| 6 | Special | 19 December 2016 | |
| 7 | Special | 24 December 2017 | |
| 7 | 8 | 2 January 2018 | 20 February 2018 |
| Finale Special | | 23 December 2018 | |

== Episodes ==
=== Series 1 (2011) ===
| No. overall | No. in series | Title | Directed by | Written by | Original release date | (millions) |
|---|---|---|---|---|---|---|
| 1 | 1 | "Margaret's First Day" | Paul Walker | Julie Rutterford, Paul Doolan, Chris Haywood, Nat Saunders | 4 August 2011 | 2.00 |
Julie prepares to celebrate her birthday with a dinner party, but guests keep dropping out. Meanwhile, new OAP employee Margaret has trouble at the checkout when her elbow turns into tomatoes, and Kieran has a bit of trouble with a shirt.
| 2 | 2 | "Leanne's Visit" | Paul Walker | Julie Rutterford | 4 August 2011 | 1.39 |
Julie isn't happy when her popular predecessor, Leanne, pops in. Plus, Margaret tackles the tannoy.
| 3 | 3 | "The Marathon" | Paul Walker | Paul Doolan, Chris Haywood, Nat Saunders, Ash Atalla | 11 August 2011 | 1.21 |
Julie's spirits are a little too lifted when Gavin gives her the Valco manager's handbook, and Andy regrets signing up for the marathon.
| 4 | 4 | "Glen Beef's Beef" | Paul Walker | Chris Haywood, Nat Saunders | 18 August 2011 | 0.90 |
With Gavin away for the day, Julie jumps at the chance to take charge. Trouble looms, however... Meanwhile, Andy bumps into a butcher he's had a beef with in the past.
| 5 | 5 | "Katie's Flirting" | Paul Walker | Anne Marie O'Connor | 25 August 2011 | 0.97 |
Kieran isn't his usual cheeky chappy self after spotting Katie flirting with a shop fitter. Plus, Julie tries to help Gavin move on.
| 6 | 6 | "Kieran's Beard" | Paul Walker | Paul Doolan | 1 September 2011 | 0.94 |
Julie is in a right pickle when the new area manager and an old friend calls in a favour. Elsewhere, Kieran gets some stick for his 'beard'.
| 7 | 7 | "Gavin's Night Out" | Paul Walker | Julie Rutterford | 8 September 2011 | 0.88 |
Kieran's girlfriend has a big question to ask him, and Gavin isn't his usual self after getting, ahem, trollied the night before. Plus, Julie receives some rather good news.
| 8 | 8 | "Julie's Interview" | Paul Walker | Paul Doolan, Chris Haywood, Nat Saunders | 15 September 2011 | 0.94 |
Julie awaits her interview, and Katie has some bad news for Kieran.

=== Series 2 (2012) ===
| No. overall | No. in series | Title | Directed by | Written by | Original release date | (millions) |
|---|---|---|---|---|---|---|
Series
| 9 | 1 | "The New Manager" | Paul Walker | Paul Doolan, Chris Haywood, Nat Saunders | 31 August 2012 | 0.76 |
The day that Julie has been dreading arrives. Gavin is checking out of Valco for pastures new and, to make matters worse, Julie doesn't make the best first impression on his replacement, Lorraine.
| 10 | 2 | "Katie Returns To Work" | Paul Walker | Paul Doolan | 31 August 2012 | 0.70 |
Changes loom as Lorraine unveils Valco's below-basic 'No Nonsense' range, which doesn't go down well with a distinctly unimpressed Julie. Meanwhile, a refreshed but short-of-cash Katie drops by for a visit - will she be tempted by her old job?
| 11 | 3 | "Gavin's Visit" | Paul Walker | Anne Marie O'Connor | 7 September 2012 | 0.67 |
Gavin returns for his first scheduled visit as area manager and he's a bit miffed that nobody seems to have missed him much. Butchers Andy and Kieran, meanwhile, have fallen out; and Katie's back on the tills, which could cause a little bit of friction...
| 12 | 4 | "A Bout of Flu" | Paul Walker | Ben Edwards, Rachael New | 14 September 2012 | 0.81 |
Lorraine's crisis management skills are stretched when Valco is struck by a bout of the flu. Her strategy is to spread the bug-less members of the team across the store, a sound enough plan until Lorraine puts Leighton on the tills.
| 13 | 5 | "Leighton Gets Sacked" | Paul Walker | Stuart Farrell | 21 September 2012 | 0.70 |
Good intentions backfire when Leighton does his bit to combat global warming... by turning down the freezers. It is one mishap too many and, far from getting behind Leighton's environmental crusade, Lorraine decides to fire him.
| 14 | 6 | "Julie's Backlash" | Jonathan Gershfield | Paul Doolan, Adrian Poynton | 28 September 2012 | 0.84 |
News of Leighton's sacking doesn't go down well, and it's Julie who receives the brunt of the backlash. The No Nonsense range comes in handy for a pregnant Sue.
| 15 | 7 | "Lorraine's Anger" | Jonathan Gershfield | Abigail Wilson | 5 October 2012 | 0.66 |
Lorraine vents her anger in Julie's direction when a chuffed Leighton returns to work. Meanwhile, Katie updates Kieran on the latest in her love life.
| 16 | 8 | "An Unlikely Pairing" | Jonathan Gershfield | Chris Haywood, Nat Saunders | 12 October 2012 | 0.71 |
Gavin and Lorraine are as unlikely a pairing as Spam and ice cream but, with Julie on 'sick leave', they're forced to work together.
| 17 | 9 | "The Fire Drill" | Jonathan Gershfield | Ben Edwards, Rachael New | 19 October 2012 | 0.74 |
It's the day of the scheduled fire drill and Julie's still off, so Gavin steps in to brief the troops.
| 18 | 10 | "Julie Returns To Work" | Paul Murphy | Abigail Wilson | 26 October 2012 | 0.82 |
Julie is welcomed back to a Lorraine-free Valco and, therapy having done the trick, she's noticeably more relaxed; unnervingly so.
| 19 | 11 | "The Staff Wages" | Paul Murphy | Anne Marie O'Connor | 2 November 2012 | 0.72 |
Gavin is hit hard by the death of his dog Chester and, understandably distracted, accidentally leaves out a document detailing staff wages, which Leighton promptly pins up on the noticeboard.
| 20 | 12 | "Lorraine's Replacement" | Paul Murphy | Chris Haywood, Nat Saunders | 9 November 2012 | 0.74 |
Gavin assures Julie that he won't make another Lorraine-shaped mistake as the search for her replacement gets under way.
| 21 | 13 | "The One-Millionth Customer" | Paul Murphy | Paul Doolan | 16 November 2012 | 0.61 |
It's the one-millionth customer promotion, complete with balloon archway and Leighton in the guise of the Valco tick.
Special
| 22 | S | "Christmas Special" | Jonathan Gershfield | Paul Doolan, Chris Haywood, Nat Saunders | 24 December 2012 | 0.95 |
It's Christmas Eve and mayhem ensues when the turkey delivery fails to arrive and there's a big party to look forward to where a certain butcher takes on the role of Santa.

=== Series 3 (2013) ===
| No. overall | No. in series | Title | Directed by | Written by | Original release date | (millions) |
|---|---|---|---|---|---|---|
Series
| 23 | 1 | "Richard France" | Paul Harrison | Paul Doolan | 22 August 2013 | 0.75 |
Changes abound as the supermarket sitcom begins its third series. Gavin and Julie meet the new head of strategy, a flashy upstart with big plans for Valco.
| 24 | 2 | "Valco Better" | Paul Harrison | Paul Doolan | 29 August 2013 | 0.73 |
Gavin finds himself at odds with the forward-thinking Richard during a brainstorm for the new Valco Better store. Valco could soon be down a staff member as well when a visit from Emma's dad prompts Kieran to consider moving out of Warrington.
| 25 | 3 | "The Suggestion Fort" | Paul Harrison | Ben Edwards, Rachael New | 5 September 2013 | 0.73 |
Richard France's latest brainwave is given the greenlight - a 'suggestion fort' to find out what customers want from the Valco Better store.
| 26 | 4 | "The Fast Lane" | Paul Harrison | Richard Preddy | 12 September 2013 | 0.62 |
Andy the butcher is smitten by his ex, Sarah and can't wipe the grin off of his face, divulging a few too many details about their date the night before.
| 27 | 5 | "Farewell Andy" | Paul Harrison | Abigail Wilson | 19 September 2013 | 0.71 |
Andy is leaving the Warrington branch of Valco for pastures new. He decides to follow his former flame, Sarah, to Scarborough. Richard, meanwhile, takes Leighton to present some ideas to head office.
| 28 | 6 | "WAANC" | Paul Murphy | Amy Shindler | 26 September 2013 | 0.52 |
When the store makeover starts, and Richard commandeers half of the staff for a 'Valco Better' training session, Gavin reaches the end of his tether.
| 29 | 7 | "The Orange Hoodie" | Paul Murphy | Abigail Wilson | 3 October 2013 | 0.47 |
Richard sets out to make Gavin more approachable. Is this the last straw? Anna is far more concerned with finding Julie "some loving every day"...
| 30 | 8 | "The Night Shift" | Paul Murphy | Paul Doolan | 10 October 2013 | 0.43 |
As the team gather to give the store a post-closing once-over before the grand 'Valco Better' reopening, Richard pulls a last-minute surprise out of his hat: completely rearranging the store.
| 31 | 9 | "The Grand Reopening" | Paul Murphy | Richard Preddy | 17 October 2013 | 0.54 |
France pulls out all the stops for the big reopening, booking a celebrity shopper in the form of Kelly Brook. An unimpressed Gavin, meanwhile, crosses the line.
| 32 | 10 | "Julie Cook: Manager" | Jonathan Gershfield | Amy Shindler | 24 October 2013 | 0.53 |
The fallout between Gavin and Richard is the talk of the store, even more so when Julie is temporarily promoted to manager. Plus, Katie makes a discovery.
| 33 | 11 | "Gavin's Return" | Jonathan Gershfield | Paul Doolan | 31 October 2013 | 0.50 |
Gavin is back at work and doing his best to be a bit more like France. Plus, Colin and Lisa's stag and hen dos are almost upon them.
| 34 | 12 | "Katie's Choice" | Jonathan Gershfield | Abigail Wilson | 7 November 2013 | 0.52 |
The number of customers has dropped like a stone following the Valco Better launch, which allows Linda and Sue to spot a shoplifter. Richard, meanwhile, is urging an emasculated Gavin to quit.
| 35 | 13 | "The Supermarket Awards" | Jonathan Gershfield | Ben Edwards, Rachael New | 7 November 2013 | 0.53 |
The supermarket awards are here, and France hatches a dastardly plan to fool the judges. Gavin, at the end of his tether, resigns, and there look to be a number of new starts on the horizon.
Special
| 36 | S | "Christmas Special" | Paul Harrison | Paul Doolan, Abigail Wilson | 24 December 2013 | 0.62 |
Gavin invites Julie over for Christmas dinner and, understandably, she thinks this is going to be the mistletoe moment she's been waiting for.

=== Series 4 (2014) ===
| No. overall | No. in series | Title | Directed by | Written by | Original release date | (millions) |
|---|---|---|---|---|---|---|
| 37 | 1 | "New Recruits" | Paul Harrison | Paul Doolan | 3 November 2014 | 0.72 |
A raft of newbies join Valco and Colin is horrified when he recognises one of the fresh faces strolling down the aisle - it's his nan, Rose (Miriam Margoyles).
| 38 | 2 | "Daniel's First Day" | Paul Harrison | Abigail Wilson | 10 November 2014 | 0.68 |
While salvation arrives for Gavin in the form of new deputy manager Daniel, sparks fly when VIP till girl Charlie also hits Valco. Charlie isn't the brightest spark in the cereal box, but she'll probably keep her job because her dad happens to own the supermarket empire. Somebody should mention that to Daniel before he makes a drastic decision he'll regret...
| 39 | 3 | "Rose's Predicament" | Paul Harrison | Rachael New | 17 November 2014 | 0.77 |
Some fake banknotes are doing the rounds and eager-to-please Rose shops a customer for the crime. His notes turn out to be fine, but the OAP won't let a teeny tiny detail like innocence stop her from administering her own unique form of justice. Could it cost Rose her job, though? Brian, on the other hand, has a bee in his bonnet about a parking space.
| 40 | 4 | "First Aid Training" | Paul Harrison | Nat Saunders | 24 November 2014 | 0.52 |
First aid training gets under way but Brian is skeptical about such matters; pharmacists rule medicine, you see, not Jonny-come-latelies. Security guard Ian, meanwhile, is at his wits' end because of an unwelcome visitor: a fox. He'd appreciate it, then, if Harry (and his collection of fake fur coats) would stop winding him up.
| 41 | 5 | "The Flintoff Party Range" | Paul Harrison | Abigail Wilson | 1 December 2014 | 0.55 |
Rose and Margaret receive a blast from the past when they realise they know each other from a former life. A special guest stops by the store too, in the form of Freddie Flintoff.
| 42 | 6 | "The Canteen Coup" | Paul Harrison | Paul Doolan | 8 December 2014 | 0.53 |
The staff are unhappy because canteen prices have been hiked up. Charlie puts a smile back on their faces though.
| 43 | 7 | "Official Training Inspection" | Paul Harrison | Amy Shindler | 15 December 2014 | 0.74 |
Gavin is determined to make Charlie look good when dad Brendan swings by the store. Plus, Colin forces Rose and Lisa to resolve their differences.
| 44 | 8 | "The Charity Raffle" | Paul Harrison | Paul Doolan | 22 December 2014 | 0.58 |
It's charity day at Valco and everyone's doing their little bit to help.

=== Series 5 (2015) ===
| No. overall | No. in series | Title | Directed by | Written by | Original release date | (millions) |
|---|---|---|---|---|---|---|
Series
| 45 | 1 | "Fresh Competition" | Jonathan Gershfield | Abigail Wilson | 2 November 2015 | 0.58 |
Gavin relays the shocking news that rival chain Lauda is due to open on Valco's patch. While the news worries the rest of the staff, Gavin remains unconcerned. That is until he learns that the store will be run by notorious manager Cheryl Fairweather (Sarah Parish).
| 46 | 2 | "Corporate Espionage" | Jonathan Gershfield | Ben Edwards, Rachael New | 9 November 2015 | 0.60 |
Gavin assembles a team of spies to infiltrate the competition and discover what Lauda has to offer.
| 47 | 3 | "Price Wars" | Jonathan Gershfield | Paul Doolan | 16 November 2015 | 0.52 |
Everyone is on high alert as big Valco boss Brendan O'Connor descends on the store.
| 48 | 4 | "The Dairy Sale" | Sarah O'Gorman | Jon Hunter | 23 November 2015 | 0.56 |
Neville's insecurities show when girlfriend Linda runs into an old flame. Meanwhile Charlie discovers an embarrassing secret about Daniel.
| 49 | 5 | "Product Recall" | Sarah O'Gorman | Ben Edwards, Rachael New | 30 November 2015 | 0.46 |
Arch-enemies Gavin and Cheryl begin to get on well after calling a truce. Could love be in the air for the Valco manager?
| 50 | 6 | "Blackmail" | Sarah O'Gorman | Hannah George | 7 December 2015 | 0.57 |
Pharmacist Brian proves sceptical about giving blood when a donor bank sets up in store.
| 51 | 7 | "The Spider" | Jonathan Gershfield | Paul Doolan | 14 December 2015 | 0.50 |
While Gavin frets about his relationship, Katie is tasked with the tough challenge of training the staff to recognise which fruits are which.
| 52 | 8 | "The 50th Anniversary" | Sarah O'Gorman | Abigail Wilson | 14 December 2015 | 0.46 |
A treasure hunt is held to celebrate 50 years of Valco value. Meanwhile, despite his best efforts, Gavin can't avoid confronting his and Cheryl's situation.
Special
| 53 | S | "A Christmas Carol" | Jonathan Gershfield | Paul Doolan, Abigail Wilson | 23 December 2015 | 0.69 |
It's Christmas Eve and Gavin is proving a real Scrooge. Can a surprise visit from Julie put him in the festive spirit?

=== Series 6 (2016) ===
| No. overall | No. in series | Title | Directed by | Written by | Original release date | (millions) |
|---|---|---|---|---|---|---|
Series
| 54 | 1 | "New Sales Rep" | Paul Harrison | Paul Doolan | 7 November 2016 | 0.62 |
The search for the new Valco area manager is finally over. After an unexpected incident in the store, Gavin's thoughts turn to the amount of cheap unhealthy food that Valco sells; and pushy, arrogant new 'pleasure food' sales rep Duncan Trench makes his presence felt.
| 55 | 2 | "The Meeting" | Paul Harrison | Abigail Wilson | 14 November 2016 | 0.53 |
Area manager Cheryl struggles to keep a lid on her private life, while Neville is brimming with confidence when he helps new shelf-stacker Shai.
| 56 | 3 | "The Hexagon of Health" | Paul Harrison | Ben Edwards, Rachael New | 21 November 2016 | 0.47 |
It's a big day for Gavin as he prepares to launch his new healthy eating initiative. Meanwhile, Brian gives a harrowing presentation on the dangers of fat.
| 57 | 4 | "Pleasure Foods Drive" | Paul Harrison | Chris Hayward | 28 November 2016 | 0.46 |
Duncan's back in store and is far from impressed with Gavin's health food drive. Katie also faces an unwanted visitor in the form of Daniel's girlfriend Holly.
| 58 | 5 | "The Business Lunch" | Paul Murphy | Paul Doolan | 5 December 2016 | 0.43 |
It's Gavin and Cheryl's 11-month anniversary so Gavin plans a romantic afternoon. But when Duncan catches wind of their plans he starts to meddle...
| 59 | 6 | "The Rumour Mill" | Paul Murphy | Ben Edwards, Rachael New | 12 December 2016 | 0.63 |
Duncan takes great delight in announcing the failure of Gavin's health food drive, while Neville is roped into giving Linda driving lessons.
| 60 | 7 | "Sexual Harassment Training" | Paul Murphy | Abigail Wilson | 12 December 2016 | 0.59 |
Cheryl orders Gavin to cooperate with Duncan as he launches a new energy drink in store. Meanwhile, things between Holly, Katie and Daniel take an unusual turn.
Special
| 61 | S | "Christmas Special" | Paul Murphy | Paul Doolan | 19 December 2016 | 0.61 |
Brian returns to the store and is clearly unimpressed with humble new pharmacist Alan. Elsewhere, Colin and Lisa witness something horrifying and with romance in the air at the Valco Christmas party.

=== Series 7 (2018) ===
| No. overall | No. in series | Title | Directed by | Written by | Original air date | (millions) |
|---|---|---|---|---|---|---|
Special
| 62 | S | "The Robbery" | Jonathan Gershfield | Paul Doolan | 24 December 2017 | 0.47 |
It's Christmas Eve but all is not well. A hapless team of criminals are planning to nick the takings: can Gavin save the day?
Series
| 63 | 1 | "The New Uniforms" | Jonathan Gershfield | Alex Smith | 2 January 2018 | 0.55 |
A big announcement means a shake-up at the store and Gavin's not happy.
| 64 | 2 | "The Night Manager" | Keri Collins | Abigail Wilson | 9 January 2018 | 0.48 |
Gavin struggles to hire a night manager as Valco gets set to open 24 hours. Scatty candidate Lou applies. And she could just be the final straw.
| 65 | 3 | "Lou's Induction" | Keri Collins | Abigail Wilson | 16 January 2018 | 0.45 |
Cheryl starts to seriously regret leaving Gavin in charge of the wedding plans. Katie's left to show Lou the ropes - and that's not something that proves easy.
| 66 | 4 | "The Night Shift" | Keri Collins | Paul Doolan | 23 January 2018 | 0.41 |
It's the launch of Valco 24 and Lou's got a stunning night display up her sleeve. Hot newbie Craig means Linda's keen to work the first night shift.
| 67 | 5 | "Staff Appraisals" | Keri Collins | Christine Robertson | 30 January 2018 | 0.38 |
Gavin's in for a shock as his mum pays a surprise visit. Katie takes on the staff's appraisals. And she doesn't hold back when it comes to Colin.
| 68 | 6 | "The Fire" | Jonathan Gershfield | Danny Robins | 6 February 2018 | Under 0.44 |
Gavin's out for answers when there's a fire during the night shift. Meanwhile, Lisa tries to make Colin's childhood dream a reality.
| 69 | 7 | "The Consultation Room" | Jonathan Gershfield | Paul Doolan | 13 February 2018 | 0.39 |
Gavin's got some serious amends to make after Lou uncovers his devious plan. Brian gets more than he bargained for when he opens a pharmacy consultation room.
| 70 | 8 | "Gavin's Sacrifice" | Jonathan Garshfield | Paul Doolan | 20 February 2018 | 0.32 |
Gavin makes the ultimate sacrifice in a desperate bid to fix things with Cheryl. Oblivious to the tension, Colin and Lisa plan their stag and hen dos.

=== Christmas Special (2018) ===
On 23 August 2018, it was announced that Trollied would end with a final Christmas special in December 2018. The episode was commissioned in order to give the series a proper finale.

| No. overall | No. in series | Title | Directed by | Written by | Original release date | (millions) |
|---|---|---|---|---|---|---|
| 71 | S | "The Wedding" | Paul Murphy | Paul Doolan | 23 December 2018 | 0.51 |
Final episode. Gavin and Cheryl decide it's time to leave Valco and move to Calais. Linda realises that she still has feeling for Neville, however, when Meg announces that she plans to propose to him, Linda drunkenly leaves a voicemail for Neville telling him she still loves him. Gavin begins to worry when he becomes stranded in Dublin during his stag do, and it becomes a race against time for his friends to get him to his wedding.
