= White Van Man (TV series) =

British sitcom (BBC Three, 2011–12)

- The inter-title for the series
- Created by: Adrian Poynton
- Written by: Adrian Poynton
- Starring: Will Mellor; Joel Fry; Georgia Tennant; Naomi Bentley; Clive Mantle
- Country of origin: United Kingdom
- Original language: English
- No. of series: 2
- No. of episodes: 12

Production
- Producers: Saurabh Kakkar; Simon Lupton; Rohan Acharya
- Camera setup: Single-camera setup
- Running time: 29 minutes
- Production company: ITV Studios

Original release
- Network: BBC HD; BBC Three
- Release: 22 March 2011 – 29 March 2012

Related
- Family Tools

White Van Man is a British sitcom that was created and written by Adrian Poynton and first broadcast on BBC Three and BBC HD in 2011. It began screening in March 2011, becoming the highest-rated launch ever for a sitcom on BBC Three.

Will Mellor plays Ollie, a man who has to put his business dreams on hold while he takes over the family handyman business from his father, Tony, played by Clive Mantle. The series was filmed in and around Greater Manchester, including the Best Bet betting shop in Cheadle and Hollins DIY Store in Marple. A second series ran from 23 February to 29 March 2012.

BBC Three announced on 29 April 2012 that it had cancelled White Van Man. On 11 May 2012, it was announced that an American version of White Van Man, Family Tools, was picked up by ABC for a full series. Poynton served as its co-creator. Family Tools was canceled in 2013, after filming only 10 episodes.

== Synopsis ==
White van man is colloquial for working class tradesmen in the UK.

Ollie (Will Mellor) takes over his father's handyman business in the (fictional) town of Maplebury in Northern England, which includes an old white 1997 Ford Transit and a dodgy assistant named Darren (Joel Fry), who displays little interest in working. Ollie is desperate to make his father proud, yet fails to bring in enough money. Emma (Georgia Tennant), who went to catering school with Ollie, has dreams of owning a restaurant. Liz (Naomi Bentley), Darren's sister, works in her uncle's local hardware store and is regularly visited by Ollie for supplies.

The series ends with Darren trying to get out of his marriage with Joanna, a woman with whom he got pregnant prior to events in the first episode. He is at the altar when he is saved by the police, who arrive to arrest Emma for insurance fraud.

== Characters ==
- Ollie "Rogan" Josh Curry – Will Mellor

Ollie reluctantly puts his dreams of running a restaurant on the back burner when his ailing father, Tony, turns to him to take over the family handyman business. Unfortunately for Ollie, the business comes complete with a dodgy van, some questionable tips and an even dodgier assistant, Darren. Ollie likes Emma and is oblivious to Liz's affections. He was kicked out of his cooking courses for accidentally using marijuana in his dish which he mistook for oregano. He has a strong sense of morality, which conflicts greatly with his clients, friends and family's views on the world.

- Darren Brown – Joel Fry

Darren is Ollie's assistant in the handyman business. He is lazy, does not complete his tasks, and is the one getting Ollie into most of his troubles. Darren hates being locked in rooms and is very protective of his sister (especially when he finds out Ollie once slept with her). He has serious commitment issues, and when he finds out he fathered Joanna's baby, he does everything he can to avoid her and her family (who are made up of criminals willing to beat him up if he doesn't marry Joanna).

- Emma Keeley – Georgia Tennant

Emma is Ollie's old crush from catering school days. She is now a successful restaurateur, back in town looking to set up a new business. However, she is out of ideas for a new restaurant and, in desperation, starts taking ideas from Ollie. It is not certain whether her feelings are genuine for Ollie, as all she seems interested in is the business and the ideas that Ollie comes up with. She has a deep hatred for Liz, as she is aware of Liz's feelings for Ollie. She is willing to commit underhanded deals to better her business.

- Liz "Olizia" Brown – Naomi Bentley

Liz is Darren's sister who works behind the counter at the local hardware shop. She is one of Ollie's only true admirers, although he is unsure just how serious her affection is. It is revealed that she was training to become a community support officer, as she wanted to branch out from the hardware shop. Tough and stubborn, she frequently uses innuendo with Ollie (sometimes without her even realising she's doing it) and is disappointed that he remains oblivious to them. She has a deep hatred of Emma, disliking Emma's business-minded attitude to life, feeling that Ollie would be better off without Emma and with her instead.

- Tony Curry – Clive Mantle

Tony used to be the local handyman. With recent illness leading him to early retirement, he turns to Ollie to take over the family business, Curry and Son. He is often critical of Ollie and his honest approach to the business, and it is shown that Tony often created some of the handyman jobs around the town by throwing stones at roofs, etc. Regardless, Tony is well-respected throughout Maplebury, and is often wanted by the client rather than Ollie. Tony is shown to be violent when the situation calls for it. When OIllie stages a sit-in protest for a client who refuses to pay, Tony simply approaches the troublesome client and punches him in the face, taking the money off him. At the end of series one, Tony has a heart attack, and after is constantly reminded by other characters to keep his blood-pressure down.

- Ricky – Blake Harrison

Ricky is the local thief of Mapelbury. In episode one, he steals Ollie's sat-nav and in episode five he helps Ollie and Darren to break into the estate agents. He also asks Ollie to help move some stuff for his Nan, who fought in the war and has a hip replacement. However, Ollie believes this to be another of Ricky's scams and refuses, which annoys Ricky because he is actually telling the truth for once. In the final episode, Darren and Emma convince Ricky to steal from Ollie's office to save his business. Ricky attends Darren and Joanna's wedding. When the police arrive he is seen fleeing the scene.

- Joanne – Vicky Longley

Joanne searches directory enquiries for the father of her baby who is "a handy man". In episode six, it is revealed that the baby's father is Darren, but Joanne isn't very bright and believes it is Ollie, although he has never met her before. She is shown to have a short memory as she is constantly forgetting who Darren is. Her father is a convicted criminal who regularly leaves the country to avoid parking tickets. Her uncle, whom she is doted on by, forces Darren to marry Joanna, and their wedding is stopped by the police, who arrive and arrest Emma. Joanna's uncle is recognised by the police and is tackled to the ground and placed under arrest.

== Episodes ==
=== Series 1 (2011) ===
No. overall	No. in series	Title	Directed by	Written by	Original release date	Viewers
1	1	"Ollie's First Day"	James Strong	Adrian Poynton	22 March 2011	937,000
Giving up dreams of running his own restaurant, Ollie has taken over the handyman business from his ailing dad, Tony. On his first day, Ollie quickly finds himself out of his depth, driven up the wall by his incorrigible assistant Darren and alienating every client he works for, even getting embroiled in a paternity case. In the midst of it all he runs into an old crush, Emma, and manages to make an utter fool of himself in front of her.
2	2	"Turf"	Iain B. MacDonald	Adrian Poynton	22 March 2011	769,000
Ollie decides it's time to modernise the family business and kicks into marketing overdrive to promote Curry and Sons Home Maintenance. His flyering campaign starts bringing in trade nicely, but little does he know they are ruffling some shady feathers.
3	3	"The Stand"	Iain B. MacDonald	Adrian Poynton	29 March 2011	881,000
When Jeremy, a client, refuses to pay the full amount for a bathroom fitting, Ollie blocks his driveway with the van, refusing to move unless Jeremy coughs up. This act of rebellion starts to get the attention of the local community, many of whom dislike Jeremy for multiple reasons. Darren breaks his friend Irene out of an old people's home and promptly loses her.
4	4	"The Morning After"	Iain B. MacDonald	Adrian Poynton	5 April 2011	937,000
Darren wakes up next to a beautiful woman (Susy Kane), but what should be his dream come true turns out to be a complete nightmare – particularly when he has absolutely no clue as to who she is or how he got there. Meanwhile, Ollie's crush, Emma, must face up to some serious money trouble with her financial backer in town. Her only hope is to quickly come up with some money-making ideas – could Ollie have the answers?
5	5	"Honest"	Iain B. MacDonald	Adrian Poynton	12 April 2011	810,000
Unluckily for Ollie, at the moment he makes his resolution not to use any dirty tricks, Emma implores him to break into an estate agent's office on her behalf, putting him yet again at the mercy of local burglar Ricky. Meanwhile, Darren has a dilemma, too: is stealing from a blind woman immoral if you replace said article with the same item, only a bit more stained?
6	6	"Beginnings and Ends"	Iain B. MacDonald	Adrian Poynton	19 April 2011	840,000
Not only is Ollie trapped in a room with Darren, it also seems as though everyone he knows is suddenly revealing secrets – leaving him with a big decision of his own. Meanwhile, unbeknownst to the trapped pair, a lot of people are trying to get hold of them and, if they don't find them soon, there are going to be some very serious consequences.

=== Series 2 (2012) ===
No. overall	No. in series	Title	Directed by	Written by	Original release date	Viewers
7	1	"Charity"	Iain B. MacDonald	Adrian Poynton	23 February 2012	486,000
While Darren struggles to come to terms with fatherhood, Ollie swaps the job book for a fancy new phone app, which soon lands him in hot water. Tensions between Emma and Liz rise when Emma is appointed as the new co-manager at the Coffee shop, and when Emma introduces a new staff tip system, competitions begin to arise for the two.
8	2	"The Break Up"	Iain B. MacDonald	Adrian Poynton	1 March 2012	438,000
Ollie suspects Darren of moonlighting with a rival firm and hires a new assistant. Darren soon finds himself in way over his head. Meanwhile, Emma quickly wangles herself a promotion at work. Ollie then catches Darren "cheating" on him with another firm. Ollie gets tired of Darren's excuses and decides to hire Liz as his new assistant. Will Ollie continue working without Darren or will the pressure of working without him soon weigh him down?
9	3	"Cupboard"	Iain B. MacDonald	Adrian Poynton	8 March 2012	441,000
When Darren fails to turn up for work Ollie, Liz and Tony must investigate his whereabouts, unravelling an action-packed mystery which leaves Emma to deal with Ollie's move into his new flat by herself. Ollie discovers that Darren's new flat is actually above his. And if this isn't even enough, Ollie and Liz discover that Darren's new girlfriend is in fact the mother of his child, Joanne, whom he has been seeing for weeks; but her boyfriend Steve isn't too happy with this. Can they find him in time before Steve does? And more importantly, where is Darren and why is he wearing a dress?
10	4	"The Ones That Got Away"	Iain B. MacDonald	Adrian Poynton	15 March 2012	343,000
Ollie inadvertently arranges a date with an old flame, Emma discovers that Tony has managed to get a date of his own, and Darren is left alone to work for a client with whom he shares a bitter past. When Ollie confirms the Client's name to Liz, she informs Ollie that he has just left Darren with the person he hates most in the world. But when Ollie quickly goes back to the Client's house, Darren and him seem to be "friends" – but when Ollie leaves, it seems that their "friendship" is just for show. How long can Darren's past stay in the past before he loses it with the Client? And why does Ollie think that Emma wants a threesome with Ollie's hold flame?
11	5	"They Think It's All Over"	Iain B. MacDonald	Adrian Poynton	22 March 2012	360,000
Ollie's dropped from his five-a-side football team in favour of a younger player, and takes the situation particularly badly. Meanwhile, Liz has a new boyfriend which lands her in some very hot water when she ends up getting arrested for stealing a car.
12	6	"Crime and Punishment"	Iain B. MacDonald	Adrian Poynton	29 March 2012	363,000
Darren betrays Ollie with the most severe consequences when Darren gets forced into marrying the mother of his child, Joanne – but can he actually go through with it or will someone stop the wedding for him? Meanwhile, Ollie must also contend with the possibility that Emma may not be the perfect girlfriend he thought she was when he finds some incriminating evidence.

== Viewers ==
Series one opened with a double-bill; episode 1 and 2 opened with 937,000 and 769,000 viewers respectively. The third took 881,000 viewers and the fourth got 937,000 viewers, roughly the same as the first episode. The last episode got 729,000 viewers.

Series two was broadcast on Thursday nights at 9:30pm, it had little advertising in the run up to the opening episode so didn't get as many viewers as the first series, although it did well in repeat viewings over the week and on the BBC iPlayer. The first series also had a later time slot.

Series	Avg. viewers
Series 1	800,000
Series 2	405,166

== DVD releases ==
The first series of White Van Man was released on 25 April 2011. The second series was released on 2 April 2012.

== U.S. Version ==
In January 2012, a pilot for a US remake of the show was made starring Kyle Bornheimer, J. K. Simmons and Leah Remini in the main roles. On 11 May 2012 it was announced that ABC had picked up the remake (now called Family Tools) for a full season, which debuted April 29, 2013. This version is also produced by ITV through its US division in association with ABC Studios, with Poynton serving as one of its co-creators. On 10 May 2013, ABC cancelled Family Tools due to low ratings after it announced their US 2013–14 television season lineup.
