= John Lanigan =

John Lanigan may refer to:

- John Lanigan (historian) (1758–1825), Irish Church historian
- John Lanigan (radio) (born 1943), American radio and TV personality
- John Lanigan (politician) (1803–1868), Irish politician
- John Lanigan (hurler) (1912–1988), Irish hurler
- John Lanigan (tenor) (1921–1996), Australian operatic tenor
- John J. Lanigan (1935–2014), American businessman and politician
- John R. Lanigan (1902–1974), United States Marine Corps general
