= Little Boy Blue (TV series) =

ITV drama series about the murder of Rhys Jones

- Genre: Drama
- Written by: Jeff Pope
- Directed by: Paul Whittington
- Starring: Stephen Graham; Sinéad Keenan; Stephen Walters; Christine Tremarco; Sara Powell; Grant Crookes; Faye McKeever; Brían F. O'Byrne
- Composer: Niall Byrne
- Country of origin: United Kingdom
- Original language: English
- No. of series: 1
- No. of episodes: 4

Production
- Executive producer: Jeff Pope
- Producer: Kwadjo Dajan
- Running time: 60 minutes
- Production company: ITV Studios

Original release
- Network: ITV
- Release: 24 April – 15 May 2017

Little Boy Blue is an ITV drama series, shown over four sixty-minute episodes from 24 April to 15 May 2017. The series focuses on the murder of Rhys Jones in Croxteth, Liverpool in 2007. For his performance, Brían F. O'Byrne won the British Academy Television Award for Best Supporting Actor in 2018.

== Cast ==
- Stephen Graham as Detective Superintendent Dave Kelly
- Sinéad Keenan as Melanie Jones
- Brían F. O'Byrne as Steve Jones
- Faye McKeever as Claire Olssen
- Sonny Beyga as Rhys Jones
- Matthew Roberts as Owen Jones
- Stephen Walters as DCI Mark Guinness
- Grant Crookes - Detective Constable
- Christine Tremarco as Marie Thompson
- Sara Powell as Assistant Chief Constable Pat Gallan
- Michael Moran as Kevin Moody
- Nathan Clark Smith as Jordan Olssen
- James Nelson-Joyce as James Yates
- Paddy Rowan as Sean Mercer
- Jack McMullen as Dean Kelly

== Production ==
Stephen Graham was cast as Detective Superintendent Dave Kelly and Sinéad Keenan and Brían F. O'Byrne were cast as Melanie and Steve Jones, respectively in a new four-part drama titled Little Boy Blue. On 18 April 2017, it was confirmed that the programme would begin its broadcasting on 24 April 2017 on a weekly basis, concluding on 15 May.

== Episodes ==
Little Boy Blue aired in four sixty-minute episodes. Whilst filming took place in Liverpool, the murder scene itself was filmed outside Liverpool as a sign of respect for his parents. However locations used in Liverpool include the Anglican Cathedral and Liverpool Crown Court.

No.	Title	Directed by	Written by	Original release date	UK viewers (millions)
1	"Episode One"	Paul Whittington	Jeff Pope	24 April 2017	8.12
When eleven-year-old schoolboy Rhys Jones is brutally shot dead walking home from football practice, Detective Superintendent Dave Kelly (Stephen Graham) is charged with bringing his teenage killer to justice. His identity is well known, but finding the evidence to charge him proves to be a far more difficult challenge.
2	"Episode Two"	Paul Whittington	Jeff Pope	1 May 2017	7.88
As Rhys Jones is laid to rest, a police raid at the home of Kevin Moody (Michael Moran) leads to the recovery of the gun used in his murder. Moody must choose between being labelled a "grass" and risking retribution, or speaking the truth to clear his name. Unexpectedly, a forensic examination of the gun leaves the entire investigation hanging in the balance.
3	"Episode Three"	Paul Whittington	Jeff Pope	8 May 2017	7.99
When potential witness Claire Olssen is intimidated into changing her statement, the investigation team look for other ways to reinforce their case. As Steve returns to work, Kelly is offered a deal that tests his resolve.
4	"Episode Four"	Paul Whittington	Jeff Pope	15 May 2017	8.25
Mercer and his associates are tried for their roles in Rhys's murder. The verdict fails to bring closure for Melanie (Sinead Keenan) and Steve (Brían F. O'Byrne) as the fractures in their relationship come to a head. An unexpected setback leaves Kelly with a tough decision to make.
