= The Night Caller (TV series) =

2024 television miniseries

- Genre: Crime drama
- Created by: Nick Saltrese
- Written by: Nick Saltrese
- Directed by: Diarmuid Goggins
- Starring: Robert Glenister; Sean Pertwee; Suzanne Packer; Stephen Walters
- Composer: Laura Rossi
- Country of origin: United Kingdom
- Original language: English
- No. of seasons: 1
- No. of episodes: 4

Production
- Executive producers: David Collins; David Nath; Sam Tipper-Hale
- Producer: Alex Jones
- Cinematography: JJ Rolfe
- Editor: Sean Keeley
- Production companies: Story Films; All3Media International; Channel 5 Television; Samson Films

Original release
- Network: Channel 5
- Release: 7 July – 10 July 2024

The Night Caller is a four-part British television miniseries, created and written by Nick Saltrese. It stars Robert Glenister and Sean Pertwee. It was broadcast on Channel 5 on four consecutive nights from 7 July to 10 July 2024.

== Synopsis ==
The series revolves around Tony, a lonely teacher turned cab driver in Liverpool who develops a dangerous obsession with a radio host.

== Cast ==
- Robert Glenister as Tony
- Sean Pertwee as Lawrence
- Suzanne Packer as Rosa
- Stephen Walters as Rob
- James Keating as Joe Hall
- Grainne Keenan as DS Marshall
- Charlie Griffiths as News Reporter
- Philip Shaun McGuinness as Mechanic

== Episodes ==
No.	Episode	Directed by	Written by	Original release date	UK viewers (millions)
1	Episode 1	Diarmuid Goggins	Nick Saltrese	7 July 2024	N/A
2	Episode 2	Diarmuid Goggins	Nick Saltrese	8 July 2024	N/A
3	Episode 3	Diarmuid Goggins	Nick Saltrese	9 July 2024	N/A
4	Episode 4	Diarmuid Goggins	Nick Saltrese	10 July 2024	N/A

== Reception ==
A four star review was published in i by Emily Watkins. Anita Singh in The Telegraph gave it three out of five stars.
