= Massive (TV series) =

- Created by: Damian Lanigan
- Starring: Ralf Little; Carl Rice; Christine Bottomley; Faye McKeever; Johnny Vegas; Beverly Rudd
- Country of origin: United Kingdom
- Original language: English
- No. of series: 1
- No. of episodes: 6

Production
- Running time: 30 minutes

Original release
- Network: BBC Three
- Release: 14 September – 12 October 2008

Massive is a sitcom broadcast on digital channel BBC Three. It is set in Manchester and stars Ralf Little and Carl Rice as Danny and Shay, who leave their office jobs to set up a record label when Danny inherits £10,000 following the death of his grandmother. The series began airing on BBC Three on 14 September 2008.

== Cast and characters ==
- Danny Stewart: (Ralf Little), best friend to Shay, it is his money that allows them to set up Shady Music. He gets on well with Shay although on many occasions has many disagreements with him about his style of music. He has also found himself in an unwanted relationship with Tina. Danny drives an Austin Allegro.
- Shay Finnegan: (Carl Rice), real name Seamus. Son of Tony and Lorraine, he is the first of his family to find gainful employment. He also has unusual interests in music, mainly from an interest in "The Lamps" and trying to resurrect old music styles. He does not like HearKittyKitty but soon grows fond of them as they become more successful.
- Lou: (Christine Bottomley), local music critic and journalist.
- Tony Finnegan: (Johnny Vegas), petty thief, father of Shay.
- Lorraine Finnegan: (Lorraine Cheshire), mother of Shay, she is fond of drinking alcohol, especially Strongbow cider.
- Nancy: (Joanne King), young lady who works in the cafe, a friend of Danny's and love interest of Swing.
- Swing: (Joel Fry), geeky friend of Danny and Shay, he DJs in his spare time. Works in an electrical store and lives with his mother. The series sees him pursuing his relationship with Nancy
- Tina Simpson: (Beverly Rudd), one half of HearKittyKitty. Sister to Marie and at pains to tell everyone she meets that she is not adopted. She likes drinking Lambrini perry and has a love interest with Danny.
- Marie Simpson: (Faye McKeever), the other half of HearKittyKitty. She likes eating pies. She and her sister both work in Superb'Uns, a baker's shop.
- Manny Westside: (Paul Kaye), recovering cocaine addict, record producer and DJ.
- Tommy Sadoski: (Nigel Whitmey), American Anglophile and lawyer with a penchant for pork pies.
- Ricky Lisburg: (Steve Furst), Washed up A&R scout. He needs to make a successful signing soon and is willing to try anything to get HearKittyKitty to jump to his label – he is not beyond pretending to be a reporter or acting camp to get what he needs. His reading material consists of Self Help Books.
- The Pott Shrigleys: (Peter and the Wolf (UK band)) The Hebden Bridge five-piece who feature in Episode 6 of the series. The title music, 'Make It Alone,' and 'White Noise' are the 2 songs played by the band, with the latter being the single song showcased at the Hebden Bridge gig.
- The Lamps: (a.P.A.t.T. (UK band)) The Hebden Bridge six-piece who feature in Episode 1/2 of the series. "The band perform in masks and write songs about Jeremy Paxman – they're never going to sell any records." Two songs were composed by a.P.A.t.T. for the show "Dogs Ablaze" and "Oo La La Jeremy Paxman"

The programme was produced by Jim Poyser and directed by David Kerr.

== Episode list ==
Episode	Title	Original Broadcast Date	Indepth Synopsis
1.1	"Creation of the Label"	14 September 2008	Danny and Shay start a new clerical job as filing clerks. They quit to set up the record label when Danny learns that he has inherited £10,000 from his grandmother. Lou suggests that they hold a Battle of the Bands competition to find an act to sign to the label. They rent a run down warehouse next to the Manchester Ship Canal as an office and Shay's father Tony helps them to furnish the premises with stolen furniture on the understanding that he and Shay's mother Lorraine can appear at the Battle of the Bands. The pair audition local artists for the competition, the event takes place and HearKittyKitty (Tina and Marie) are the winners.
1.2	"Recording the Single"	14 September 2008	With HearKittyKitty signed to the label, Danny and Shay recruit producer Manny Westside to mix and produce the single, a cover of the Diana Ross hit I'm Coming Out. Tony has asked Shay to look after a bag belonging to local hard man Big Stu and Shay hides it above the high cistern of the toilet cubicle at the recording studio hired for the recording session. Manny, who it transpires has recently returned from a drug rehabilitation retreat in India, finds the bag which contains packages of cocaine. He takes a large amount of the drug and produces a tune that the others describe as "someone being hit by a train". Shay has to buy cocaine to replace that taken by Manny. Danny becomes romantically involved with Tina. Swing takes Nancy from the coffee shop on a disastrous date. Manny manages to produce a polished version of I'm Coming Out.
1.3	"The Music Video"	21 September 2008	Danny and Shay hear the HearKittyKitty single being played on BBC Radio 1. After an A&R man from a rival label, played by Steve Furst, attempts to poach the group, the girls demand that Danny and Shay make a music video to go with their single. They hire a video camera and with Lou's help are allowed to use a BBC studio overnight. They find that the studio is set up for the filming of Mastermind and that they are not allowed to remove the scenery or props, including the famous black chair. Luckily Tina and Marie love the video that is made and the kitsch album cover designed by Shay.
1.4	"The Photo Shoot"	28 September 2008	With HearKittyKitty reaching the charts, Danny and Shay decide it is time to start heavily focussing on the band's PR and invest in renowned photographer Nico. Tony steps in to help Shady Music pay for the photo shoot by asking Danny and Shay to pick up an illegal immigrant for Big Stu. Whilst the "cargo" is being kept in Shady Music's office, Swing opens up to her and builds up a rapport with her after she helps him deal with his feeling's for Nancy. The A&R man from the rival company attempts to discredit Shady Records and phones the Daily Mirror pretending to be Danny. When the false, derogatory interview makes the paper, HearKittyKitty's relationship with Shady Records begins to wear thin.
1.5	"The Break Up"	5 October 2008	Just as HearKittyKitty's future with the label starts looking bleak, an American lawyer, played by Nigel Whitmey, arrives in Manchester to sue the label for using the same name as Eminem's record label. (See Shady Records) In an attempt to keep HearKittyKitty Danny books a signing event at an opening of a new shop and books a limo for the ladies to arrive in. Unfortunately the owner of the shop kept the fact that it was an adult store to himself and the limo turns out to be a converted Estate car. This causes HearKittyKitty to sack Shady Records and Danny and Shay to dissolve the label after an argument makes them split. The American lawyer, after getting drunk with Danny, finds out there is no papertrail as to the label's existence and drops the charges.
1.6	"The Re-Launch"	12 October 2008	After Lou finds out Danny and Shay have gone back to temping, she confronts them about signing a new band and suggests they travel around the North West to try and sign an act. In an attempt to acquire funds for their journey Danny and Shay approach Danny's father Dennis Stewart at his garden centre, and leave with £4000. On the trip to Hebden Bridge Danny's car breaks down causing Danny and Shay to walk to the gig, which they promptly forget the venue for, and end up going to a pub for a drink. Here, The Pott Shrigleys are playing, and during a night of drinking Danny signs them to the label, now named Massive Records. Tony and Lorraine's afternoon with Dennis Stewart leads him to burn his garden centre down resolutely and Nancy makes a move on Swing during a recording session in Swing's bedroom. The season closes with Lou kissing Danny.
