= Great Night Out =

- Genre: Comedy drama
- Created by: Mark Bussell; Justin Sbresni
- Written by: Mark Bussell; Justin Sbresni; Steve Turner; Jonathan Harvey
- Directed by: Elliot Hegarty; Iain B MacDonald
- Starring: Lee Boardman; William Ash; Craig Parkinson; Stephen Walters
- Composer: Vince Pope
- Country of origin: United Kingdom
- Original language: English
- No. of series: 1
- No. of episodes: 6

Production
- Camera setup: Single camera
- Running time: 60 minutes (inc. adverts)
- Production company: Hat Trick Productions

Original release
- Network: ITV
- Release: 11 January – 15 February 2013

Great Night Out is a British comedy drama which aired on ITV in 2013. It was created by Mark Bussell and Justin Sbresni and starred Lee Boardman, William Ash, Craig Parkinson and Stephen Walters. The series was cancelled by ITV after one series.

== Background ==
The series follows the misadventures of four thirty-something former school friends from Stockport, Matthew 'Beggsy' Begg (William Ash), Paddy 'Hodge' Hodgkinson (Lee Boardman), Glyn Thwaite (Craig Parkinson), and Darren 'Daz' Taylor (Stephen Walters). All four love football and are lifelong fans of Stockport County. Hodge has been married for five years prior to the first episode, whilst Daz is in a long-term relationship. Glyn and Beggsy both get girlfriends as the series progresses. They frequent their local pub, the Admiral Nelson, where they often tease and banter with the landlord Warren Peterson (Ricky Tomlinson).

Actor Stephen Walters, who plays Daz in the series, described the show by saying: "Great Night Out is a positive and upbeat comedy-drama series and audiences love that sort of escapism. People don't always want to sit though something dark and hard-hitting and depressing. There's a place for those sort of shows, but at a time when people are tightening their belts this series is all about warmth, friendship and pure escapism."

Jimmy Mulville, executive producer of the series, said: "I hope we do justice to the brilliant scripts and wonderful cast. This is a laugh-out-loud comedy about friendship, love and Stockport!”

L-R: Naomi Bentley, Stephen Walters, Rebekah Staton, Lee Boardman, William Ash, Christine Bottomley and Craig Parkinson

== Cast and characters ==
- Lee Boardman as Paddy "Hodge" Hodgkinson, who sees himself as the leader of the group, although his friends don't see him that way. He speaks with the voice of authority on most subjects, even though his knowledge is often lacking. Very humorous and lovable, Hodge often banters with both Beggsy and local pub landlord Warren. While he thinks of himself as the man of the house, his penchant for avoiding responsibility and spending money leave his wife Kath in charge of their household.
- William Ash as Matthew "Beggsy" Begg, who often rubs Hodge up the wrong way and winds him up. Overall though he's a friendly man, happy being single with the odd one night stand. Divorced for a year, he still pines after his ex-wife, Mandy, who left him to run off to Australia to live with her new husband, Wayne, and taking their 11-year-old daughter, Kelly, with her. At the beginning of the series he's the only one of the lads without a partner and is in a bit of a relationship funk.
- Craig Parkinson as Glyn Thwaite, the lovable underdog. He's a sensitive man and a nice hard-working guy who is unfortunately always one sentence behind and forever playing catch-up. Glyn works for "Mad Tony", who is known for his hot temper. Once he has to look after Tony's house while he's in Russia, but the lads decide to have a party there when Stockport County F.C. play Manchester United. He meets his school crush, Julie, and yearns after her but seems to embarrass himself every time he attempts to talk to her, despite taking the advice of the others in the group. He eventually does win her heart and she becomes his girlfriend.
- Stephen Walters as Darren "Daz" Taylor, the fourth member of the gang who is described as the eternal pessimist of the group. He is the first to pull Hodge up on his sometimes questionable fashion sense, and the first to put a negative on a situation. He often performs strange actions, such as climbing on the roof of a house and claiming it was "tranquil". It an on-again/off-again relationship with Colleen, Daz can't seem to live with her as much as he can't live without her.
- Rebekah Staton as Kath Hodge, the wife of Hodge who often has the final say with her husband, who is intimidated by her, but they really do love each other. She works a stressful job at the local bowling alley during the day and many of Hodge's poor choices and mistakes in the evening.
- Naomi Bentley as Colleen, Daz's long-suffering girlfriend. They share a very on-again, off-again relationship, and no-one can understand why they are still together. Quick and with a dry sense of humour, Colleen is brutally honest. She shares a house with incompetent roommate Bev, who does not get on well with Daz.
- Christine Bottomley as Julie, Glyn's love interest. Glyn's school crush, she is now a gorgeous young single woman who seems to be out of his league. Following a chance meeting at a nightclub a will-they-won't-they relationship ensues. Julie visibly finds Glyn attractive and refreshing, but their relationship takes time to develop.
- Ricky Tomlinson as Warren, the landlord of the Admiral Nelson pub, who will do anything he can to keep the boys coming in and spending money. A father figure who nurses a secret admiration for the lads, he also enjoys playing pranks on them and participating in banter. In an effort to draw customers and make more money, Warren has quiz nights and bingo, like other local pubs.
- Susie Blake as Pam Begg, Beggy's mother whose sole objective is to ensure her son's happiness. The perfect mum, until she realizes she could make herself happy if she had a man. Now her goal is for Beggsy to find someone else rather than chasing after his ex-wife, who he obviously still loves. She doesn't interfere exactly, but he is always at her house even though he doesn't live there anymore.
- Isy Suttie as Bev, Colleen's eccentric housemate who is madly in love with Beggsy. She and Daz have an intense feud, but they put up with each other for Colleen's sake. She loves cats and baking cakes, and the secret ingredient to her cake recipes is "anger". She says that lederhosen and cruelty to animals are some of the things that make her angry. She has also sniffed marker pens at some point, as stated by Colleen.
- Connor McIntyre as Mad Tony, a local gangster who lives in a mansion in the surrounding countryside. He is Glyn's boss and owns a dog called Napoleon, which the lads find out about rather unpleasantly the first time they visit Tony's house.

== Episodes ==
No.	Title	Directed by	Written by	Original release date	UK viewers (millions)
1	"Episode 1"	Elliot Hegarty	Mark Bussell & Justin Sbresni	11 January 2013	3.77
Hodge and Kath's seemingly carefully planned wedding anniversary celebrations go slightly awry when some of the guests are waylaid. Meanwhile, Glyn goes to the extreme lengths of taking salsa lessons in an attempt to catch the eye of his gorgeous school sweetheart Julie, and the lads help a worse-for-wear comrade in need, with disastrous consequences.
2	"Episode 2"	Elliot Hegarty	Mark Bussell & Justin Sbresni	18 January 2013	3.20
When the lads try to pep Daz up after yet another row with girlfriend Colleen, Glyn's first day in his new job as a chauffeur for local psycho gangster Mad Tony is badly affected. Hodge's questionable fashion choice inadvertently lands the lads in more than a spot of bother and when Glyn's car gets stolen, they are in deep trouble.
3	"Episode 3"	Elliot Hegarty	Mark Bussell & Justin Sbresni	25 January 2013	2.75
Beggsy gets a surprise visit from his ex-wife Mandy, and quickly realises that the embers of their relationship are still smouldering. Meanwhile Glyn learns that honesty really is the best policy when trying to win the affection of Julie. Meanwhile, a schoolboy row over their teacher resurfaces between Daz and Hodge, threatening to disrupt Glyn's fancy dress birthday party plans.
4	"Episode 4"	Iain B MacDonald	Mark Bussell & Justin Sbresni	1 February 2013	3.22
Daz moves into Colleen and Bev's place, using Beggsy as his bargaining tool to clinch the deal after Hodge fits him a wet room upstairs which then proceeds to wreck his house when it falls into his downstairs living room. Glyn's new bromance with an old friend unsettles the group who are suspicious of his motives. Hodge finds himself in unfamiliar territory when Kath broaches the subject of starting a family, and further 'man problems' arise from this.
5	"Episode 5"	Iain B MacDonald	Mark Bussell & Justin Sbresni	8 February 2013	3.42
Hodge & Kath's romantic countryside weekend away turns out to be anything but when some unexpected visitors join them. Add some very posh fellow campers, and a crazy shotgun-wielding singing farmer, whilst Beggsy finds himself finally enjoying the spoils he's been missing out on in the single life. Colleen's frisky new ways have Daz asking himself some difficult questions.
6	"Episode 6"	Iain B MacDonald	Mark Bussell & Justin Sbresni	15 February 2013	3.61
Glyn scuppers the lads' plans to go to the biggest football game in history meaning he'll have to go to big lengths to make it up to them. Hodge & Kath have a trial-course of parenting only to learn it's not all it's cracked up to be and Daz has to enlist the help of Colleen's eccentric housemate Bev to spring a surprise on his girlfriend.

== International broadcast ==
Great Night Out premiered on BBC First in Australia on 29 January 2015.
