= Family Tools =

American sitcom

- Genre: Sitcom
- Based on: White Van Man by Adrian Poynton
- Developed by: Bobby Bowman
- Starring: Danielle Nicolet; Edi Gathegi; J.K. Simmons; Johnny Pemberton; Kyle Bornheimer; Leah Remini
- Theme music composer: Tomandandy
- Composer: Dan Radlauer
- Country of origin: United States
- Original language: English
- No. of seasons: 1
- No. of episodes: 10

Production
- Executive producers: Andrea Shay; Bobby Bowman; J.R. Ventimilia; Joshua Sternin; Mark Gordon; Paul Buccieri
- Camera setup: Single-camera
- Running time: 22 minutes
- Production companies: The Mark Gordon Company; ITV Studios America; ABC Studios

Original release
- Network: ABC
- Release: May 1 – July 10, 2013

Family Tools is an American sitcom that ran on ABC from May 1 to July 10, 2013, and aired on Wednesdays at 8:30 pm ET. The series was created by Bobby Bowman, is produced by Mark Gordon, ABC Studios and ITV Studios America. It is based on the British sitcom White Van Man aired on BBC 3 and produced by ITV Studios America's parent company, ITV Studios, and whose creator, Adrian Poynton, is also a co-creator and producer of the American version.

Thirteen episodes were ordered on May 11, 2012, for the first season. It was later reported on November 10, 2012, that ABC cut their order from 13 episodes to 10 because of scheduling conflicts. Family Tools was canceled on May 10, 2013, after only two episodes had aired. The show was not renewed for a second season. However, the remaining episodes aired over the summer.

== Premise ==
The series follows a man who's had a streak of bad luck with everything from enlisting in the army to flunking out of seminary three times. When he returns home, he finds himself in the unlikely position of taking over his father's hardware handyman business because his father was recently diagnosed with a heart condition. However, this transition is not as easy as expected as he tries to maintain the success of the business that his father built, especially with his father keeping a watchful eye.

== Cast ==
- Kyle Bornheimer as Jack Shea
- J. K. Simmons as Tony Shea
- Johnny Pemberton as Mason McCormick
- Edi Gathegi as Darren Bichette
- Leah Remini as Terry McCormick
- Danielle Nicolet as Stitch Bichette

== Episodes ==
No.	Title	Directed by	Written by	Original release date	U.S. viewers (millions)
1	"Pilot"	Michael Fresco	Bobby Bowman	May 1, 2013	5.79
2	"Now You See Me, Now You Don't"	Peter Lauer	Todd Linden	May 8, 2013	4.48
3	"Beachwood Approved"	John Fortenberry	Danielle Uhlarik	May 15, 2013	4.54
4	"Book Club Romance"	Rebecca Asher	Jeremy Shipp	May 29, 2013	3.66
5	"Waiting for Mrs. Bichette"	Eyal Gordin	Adrian Poynton	June 5, 2013	3.44
6	"Role Model"	Randy Zisk	Kenny Byerly	June 12, 2013	3.67
7	"The Big Event"	John Putch	Allen Zipper	June 19, 2013	3.62
8	"Jack Steps Up"	Peter Lauer	Matthew Carlson	June 26, 2013	2.79
9	"Pest Side Story"	Michael Fresco	Margee Magee and Angeli Millan	July 3, 2013	2.35
10	"Terry By Design"	Elliot Hegarty	Emily Halpern and Sarah Haskins	July 10, 2013	2.51
