= Adrian Poynton =

British screenwriter, playwright and stand up comedian

- Born: 1979 (age 46–47); Burton on Trent, Staffordshire, England, United Kingdom
- Occupations: Screenwriter, Playwright, Producer, Stand Up Comedian
- Writing career
- Notable works: White Van Man, Family Tools, A Very Naughty Boy, Trollied
- Website: www.adrianpoynton.com

Adrian Poynton (born 29 January 1979) is a British screenwriter, playwright, producer and stand up comedian. He is best known as the creator and writer of BBC Three comedy White Van Man and its American remake Family Tools. He has written projects for BBC, ITV, Sky, ABC and CBS and is often used as a Script doctor.

== Biography ==
Born in Staffordshire in 1979, Poynton attended John Taylor High School at Barton-under-Needwood in Staffordshire in the early 1990s. He first began performing as a member of the Lichfield Youth Theatre.

For many years he toured as a stand up comedian regularly performing in comedy clubs and theaters across the UK and Europe. He was also one of the UK's most popular TV studio audience warm-ups.

== Writing career ==
In 2003 his play, A Very Naughty Boy based on the life of Monty Python's Graham Chapman, won an Edinburgh Festival Fringe First award. It then had a national tour followed by a West End run at London's Soho Theatre.

During this time he was also writing scripts for children's Television. His scripts having appeared on CBBC, CBeebies and The Disney Channel.

In 2011 he created and wrote the highly rated BBC Three sitcom, White Van Man. It held the record for being the highest rated launch of a comedy ever on the channel. In 2012 White Van Man returned for a second series with Adrian once again writing all the scripts.

In 2012 he also worked on series two of supermarket sitcom Trollied for Sky One.

In 2013 White Van Man was remade in America as Family Tools for ABC with Poynton overseeing the show, writing episodes and serving as Co-Creator and Producer. Thirteen episodes were ordered on 11 May 2012, for the first season. It was later reported on 10 November 2012, that ABC cut their order from 13 episodes to 10 because of scheduling conflicts. Family Tools was canceled on 10 May 2013, after only two episodes had aired. However, the remaining episodes aired over the summer.

He remained in America for almost the next decade working as a writer, producer and script editor before returning home to the UK.

A big Doctor Who fan, he has also contributed audio plays for the Big Finish Doctor Who ranges, starting with the Fourth Doctor release, Dethras. He also wrote for the spin-off Jenny – The Doctor's Daughter starring his friend and White Van Man actress Georgia Tennant.
