= Stephen Walters =

English actor (born 1973)

- Walters in 2026
- Born: 22 May 1975 (age 51); Liverpool, Merseyside, England
- Education: Bristol Old Vic Theatre School
- Occupation: Actor
- Years active: 1989–present
- Height: 5 ft 8 in (1.73 m)

Stephen Walters (born 22 May 1975) is an English actor. Walters has appeared in television and film, with roles spanning drama and comedy. His television roles include Mad Twatter in Skins, Angus Mhor in Outlander and Thomas Malone in Shetland.

Walters was nominated for a Royal Television Society North West Award in 2013 for his role in the Sky Arts drama Ragged. In 2023, he was nominated for a Supporting Actor – Male category at the Royal Television Society Programme Awards for his role in the ITV drama Anne.

== Early life and education ==
Walters was born on 22 May 1975 in Merseyside, England, and developed an interest in acting while at secondary school. Walters then studied performing arts at Southport College. Following his appearance in Blood on the Dole (1994), Alan Bleasdale wrote him a reference that helped him gain admission to drama school. Walters subsequently attended Bristol Old Vic Theatre School.

== Career ==
=== Early career (1989–2003) ===
In 1989, Walters made his television debut in ITV's Children's anthology series Dramarama where he portrayed Corporal Tomkins in the series seven episode entitled "Ghost Story". He subsequently appeared in the fifth series of the BBC drama anthology ScreenPlay, in Jimmy McGovern's episode Needle (1990). The drama explored the needle exchange programme and heroin use in 1980s Liverpool. Walters later starred as Joey Jackson in Jim Morris' 1994 television film Blood on the Dole, part of the Alan Bleasdale Presents series for Channel 4.

Walters appeared as Ian Glover in Jimmy McGovern's television film Hillsborough (1996), based on the Hillsborough disaster at the 1989 FA Cup semi-final. He also played Jamie Johnson in the television drama Springhill (1996–1997) and reunited with "Ghost Story" director Julian Jarrold in ITV's police drama Touching Evil (1997). Walters portrayed Jack McCaffrey in the two-part series finale, "Deadly Web". He also appeared in the BBC series Pie in the Sky (1997), followed by ITV's crime drama Liverpool 1 (1998). A year later, Walters appeared as Dennis in Jake Scott's 1999 anachronistic comedy Plunkett & Macleane, alongside Robert Carlyle.

In 2001, Walters portrayed Kick Box Stevie in Stewart Sugg's dark comedy film Kiss Kiss (Bang Bang). He then appeared as bomb expert Nitro in Mean Machine (2001), produced by Matthew Vaughn and starring Vinnie Jones. The film was a remake of the 1974 Burt Reynolds film The Longest Yard. Walters also played Blowfish in Ronny Yu's 2001 film The 51st State, also known as Formula 51, alongside Samuel L Jackson and Robert Carlyle. Walters starred as Knockoff in the 2001 BBC television film Strumpet, written by Jim Cartwright, directed by Danny Boyle and starring Christopher Eccleston. He also appeared in HBO's Band of Brothers (2001), Nice Guy Eddie (2002) and Channel 4's Buried (2003) alongside Lennie James.

=== Later career (2004–2013) ===
In 2004, Walters played Dylan Forbes in the premiere episode of ITV's drama Murder City, directed by Sam Miller. That year, he appeared as Shanks alongside Daniel Craig in Matthew Vaughn's film Layer Cake. His next role was playing Joe in Guy Ritchie's 2005 crime thriller Revolver, alongside Jason Statham. He also appeared as an Arkham Lunatic in Christopher Nolan's film Batman Begins (2005). Walters later portrayed Gilbert Gifford in the BBC historical drama The Virgin Queen (2006). In 2007, he played Maddison Twatter (AKA Mad Twatter) in three episodes of E4's teen drama Skins. He also portrayed Zigmas Milko in the film Hannibal Rising (2007). Later that year, he played Splodge Costello in BBC Three's prison comedy The Visit.

Walters appeared as Wormsnakes and Wasnik in Gerald McMorrow's debut feature science-fiction/noir film Franklyn (2008), which premiered at the London Film Festival that year before its UK theatrical release in February 2009. Later in 2008, he portrayed James Williams in "The Dead Land", the two-part sixth-series finale of ITV's crime drama Wire in the Blood, directed by Philip John. In 2010, Walters played brothers Vincent and Gavin in the horror film Splintered. Scenes featuring both characters were filmed separately and edited together without the use of digital effects.

The following year, Walters appeared as Brightling alongside Sean Bean in Adrian Vitoria's WWII drama Age of Heroes, and portrayed Johnny Winegums in Powder, an adaptation of Kevin Sampson's novel of the same name. In 2012, Walters played gangster Callum Rose, opposite fellow actor Stephen Graham, in the BBC crime drama Good Cop, written by Stephen Butchard. He also portrayed Gaz in the drama film Kelly + Victor, based on Niall Griffiths's 2002 novel of the same name, and played Alan Baines alongside Sean Bean in "Tracie's Story", an episode of the BBC drama Accused.

In the spring of 2013, Walters portrayed a younger Ricky Tomlinson in Ragged, a one-off drama for Sky Arts Playhouse Presents series, directed by Johnny Vegas. The drama depicted Tomlinson's imprisonment following the 1972 builders' strike. Walters was nominated for Best Performance in a Single Drama or Drama Series at the 2013 Royal Television Society North West Awards for his role in Ragged. Ricky Tomlinson also praised Walter's portrayal in a 2014 interview. Also in 2013, Walters played Daz Taylor in the Hat Trick Productions comedy Great Night Out and schoolteacher Crispin Ingham in The Village. He also appeared as Hackett opposite Jonathan Rhys Meyers in three episodes of NBC's drama Dracula (2013–2014).

=== Present career (2014–present) ===
From 2014 to 2016, Walters portrayed Angus Mhor alongside Sam Heughan, Caitríona Balfe and Graham McTavish in Outlander, the television adaptation of Diana Gabaldon's novels. Gabaldon praised the expansion of Angus and Grant O'Rourke's Rupert MacKenzie, comparing their television portrayals to Laurel and Hardy. Also in 2015, Walters played Simon the Sorcerer in NBC's series AD the Bible Continues, a sequel to the miniseries The Bible (2015). In 2016, Walters appeared as Manning, an accused murderer, opposite Stephen Rea in two episodes of the BBC drama Dickensian. He also guest-starred as Borel in an episode of The Musketeers that year.

In early 2017, Walters appeared as the Engineer in two episodes of AMC's post-apocalyptic series Into the Badlands, alongside Daniel Wu and Nick Frost. He also appeared as DCI Mark Guinness in ITV's four-part drama Little Boy Blue, written by Jeff Pope and based on the murder of Rhys Jones. Also in 2017, Walters portrayed the role of Johnny in Rowan Joffé's Tin Star, in which he was also featured playing the guitar. The production, filmed in Canada and starring Tim Roth and Christina Hendricks, was a crime drama series.

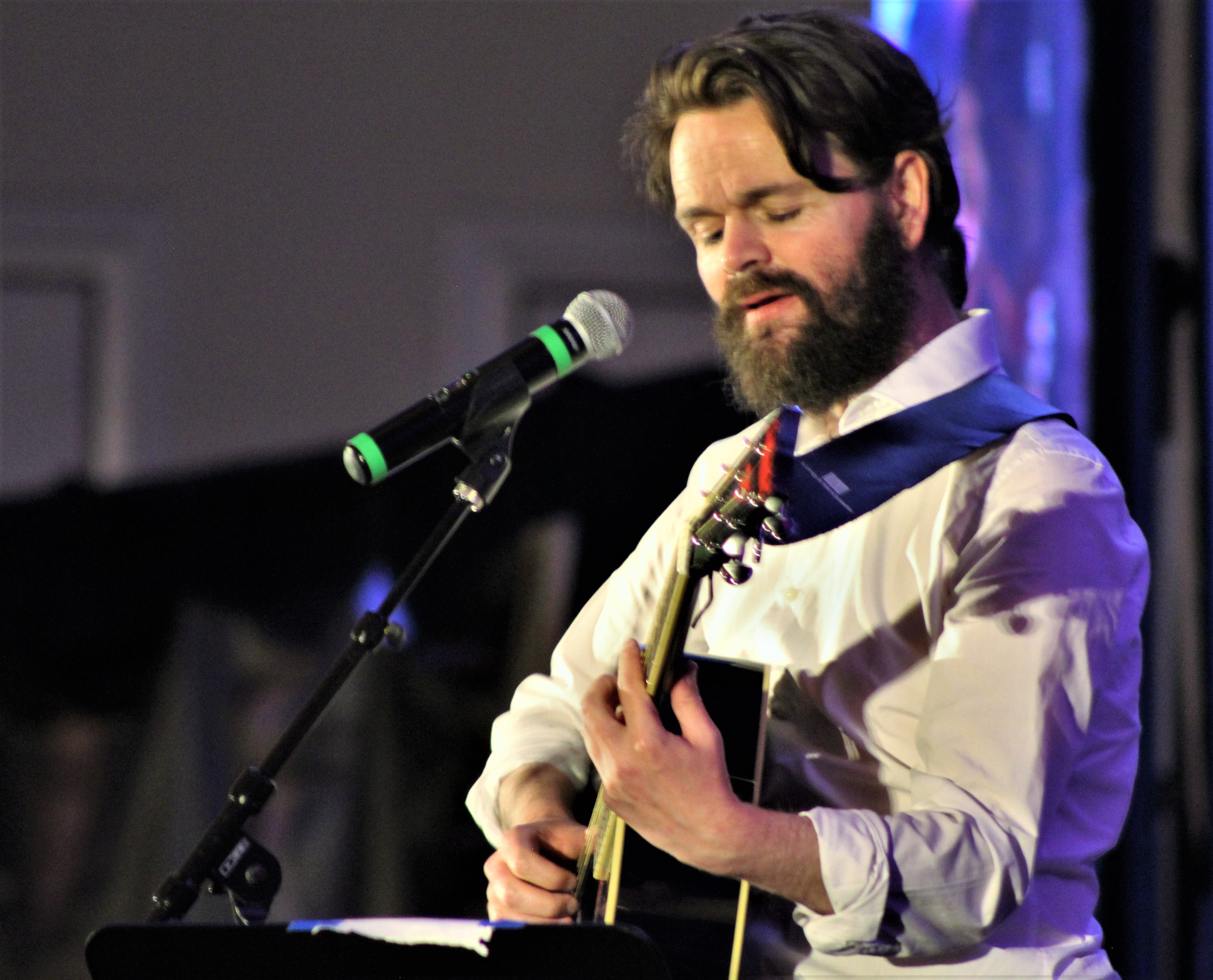
Stephen Walters performing an original song at an Outlander Convention in Las Vegas, Nevada on 15 July 2018

Walters featured in the fourth series of the BBC crime drama Shetland in 2018. He portrayed Thomas Malone, whose murder conviction was overturned after he had spent 23 years behind bars. In 2018, it was announced that Walters would star in Graham McTavish's directorial debut, This Guest of Summer, alongside Duncan Lacroix, Adam Brown and Dean O'Gorman. Walters went on to direct the short film Humpty F*cking Dumpty in 2019, starring Andrew Gower as Merseybeat singer Tommy Quickly.

In 2020, Walters returned to the BBC crime drama Silent Witness, portraying Robbie Shaw in the two-part episode "Seven Times", which focused on the pervasiveness of domestic abuse. In early 2022, Walters appeared as Steve Williams in ITV's four-part factual drama, Anne, alongside actress Maxine Peake. The role earned Walters a nomination in the newly created Supporting Actor – Male category at the 2023 Royal Television Society Programme Awards. Walters also featured as Zeppo in the first series of the Apple TV+ spy drama Slow Horses in 2022.

In February 2023, Walters guest-starred as Nial Heslop in "The Darkest Evening", the twelfth-series finale of ITV's crime drama Vera. He also played Rob in the four-part Channel 5 thriller The Night Caller in 2024. The following year, Walters appeared as Davy Crawford in the BBC crime drama This City Is Ours and in 2026, he portrayed Jed in the Netflix series Legends.

== Filmography ==
=== Television ===
Year	Title	Character	Production	Notes	Ref.
1989	Dramarama	Tomkins	ITV	Episode: "Ghost Story"	
1990	Screenplay	Viaduct Boy	BBC	Episode: "Needle"	
1993	Brookside	Geoff Rogers	Channel 4	7 episodes	
1994	Blood on the Dole	Joey Jackson	Channel 4	Television film	
1995	Jake's Progress	Joey	Channel 4	Episode: "1.7"	
1996	Hillsborough	Ian Glover	ITV	Television film	
1996–1997	Springhill	Jamie Johnson	ITV	Recurring role, 18 episodes	
1997	Touching Evil	Jack McCaffrey	ITV	Episode: "Deadly Web: Part 1 & 2"	
1997	Pie in the Sky	Hotel Receptionist	BBC	Episode: "Ugly Customers"	
1997	Wing and a Prayer	Paul Halliwell	Channel 5	Episode" "A Sense of Belonging"	
1998	Liverpool 1	Mikey Sullivan	ITV	Episode: "Fresh Meat"	
2001	Strumpet	Knockoff	BBC	Television film	
2001	Band of Brothers	John McGrath	HBO / BBC	Episode: "Carentan"	
2002	Nice Guy Eddie	Scott	BBC	Episode: "1.1"	
2003	Buried	Dr. Nick Vaughan	Channel 4	Recurring role, 8 episodes	
2003	Silent Witness	Neville Anderson	BBC	Episode: "Beyond Guilt"	
2004	Murder City	Dylan Forbes	ITV	Episode: "The Critical Path"	
2006	The Virgin Queen	Gilbert Gifford	BBC	Miniseries, 1 episode	
2007	Skins	Mad Twatter	E4	3 episodes	
2007	The Visit	Splodge Costello	BBC	Recurring role, 6 episodes	
2008	Wire in the Blood	James Williams	ITV	Episode: "The Dead Land: Part 1 & 2"	
2012	Hit & Miss	Philip	ITV	Episode: "1.6"	
2012	Good Cop	Callum Rose	BBC	3 episodes	
2012	Accused	Alan Baines	BBC	Episode: "Tracie's Story"	
2013	Great Night Out	Daz Taylor	ITV	Series regular, 6 episodes	
2013	The Village	Crispin Ingham	BBC	Recurring role, 4 episodes	
2013	Playhouse Presents	Young Ricky	Sky Arts	Episode: "Ragged"	
2013	Dracula	Hackett	NBC	3 episodes	
2014-2016	Outlander	Angus Mhor	Starz	Recurring role, 15 episodes	
2015	A.D. The Bible Continues	Simon The Sorcerer	NBC	2 episodes	
2016	Dickensian	Manning	BBC	2 episodes	
2016	Quantico	University President	ABC	Episode: "Clue"	
2016	The Musketeers	Borel	BBC	Episode: "To Play the King"	
2017	Into the Badlands	The Engineer	AMC	2 episodes	
2017	Little Boy Blue	DCI Mark Guinness	ITV	Miniseries	
2017	Tin Star	Johnny	Sky Atlantic	3 episodes	
2018	Shetland	Thomas Malone	BBC	6 episodes	
2020	Silent Witness	Robbie Shaw	BBC	Episode: "Seven Times"	
2022	Anne	Steve Williams	ITV	Miniseries	
2022	Slow Horses	Zeppo	Apple TV+	5 episodes	
2023	Vera	Nial Heslop	ITV	Episode: "The Darkest Evening"	
2024	A Gentleman in Moscow	Captain Abashev	Showtime	Episode: "The Fall"	
2024	The Night Caller	Rob	Channel 5	4 episodes	
2025	This City Is Ours	Davey Crawford	BBC One	2 episodes	
2026	Legends	Jed	Netflix	4 episodes	

=== Film ===
Year	Title	Role	Ref.
1999	Plunkett & Macleane	Dennis	
2000	Liam	Black Shirt	
2001	Kiss Kiss (Bang Bang)	Kick Box Stevie	
2001	Mike Bassett: England Manager	Supporter	
2001	The 51st State	Blowfish	
2001	Mean Machine	Nitro	
2004	Layer Cake	Shanks	
2005	Batman Begins	Arkham Lunatic	
2005	Revolver	Joe	
2007	Hannibal Rising	Zigmas Milko	
2008	Franklyn	Wormsnakes / Wasnik	
2010	Splintered	Gavin / Vincent	
2011	Age of Heroes	Brightling	
2011	Powder	Johnny Winegums	
2012	Kelly + Victor	Gaz	
2016	I'm Not Here (short film)	Co-creator and actor	
2020	Humpty Fu*king Dumpty (short film)	Writer and director	

== Awards and nominations ==
Year	Award	Category	Work	Result	Ref.
2013	Royal Television Society North West Awards	Best Performance in a Single Drama or Drama Series	Ragged	Nominated	
2016	Satellite Awards	Best Ensemble – Television	Outlander	Won (ensemble)	
2023	Royal Television Society Programme Awards	Supporting Actor – Male	Anne	Nominated	
