= Lorraine Cheshire =

British actress (1960–2025)

- Born: 15 August 1960; Wythenshawe, Manchester, England
- Died: 19 December 2025 (aged 65); Manchester, England
- Occupation: Actress
- Years active: 1994–2022
- Spouse: John Dixon (m. 1979)

Lorraine Cheshire (15 August 1960 – 19 December 2025) was an English actress, known for her roles as Joan Bell in Early Doors, Sue Benson in the Sky sitcom Trollied, Fleur Budgen in the BBC One school-based drama Waterloo Road and Lorraine Bird in the Channel 4 school-based drama series Ackley Bridge.

== Life and career ==
Cheshire was born in Wythenshawe, Manchester on 15 August 1960. She began acting at the age of 35, after her husband was made redundant from the Army. She attended the Arden Drama School in Manchester, and later joined the Manchester Actors Company. She made her professional acting debut in two episodes of the BBC series Cranford, portraying the role of Jo Warren. After that, she made appearances in series such as Clocking Off, Having It Off and Holby City. In 2003, Cheshire was cast in her first main role, in the BBC series Early Doors. She portrayed the role of Joan Bell for two series. From 2007 to 2012, she appeared in the BBC drama Waterloo Road in the recurring role of Fleur Budgen. Then in 2008, Cheshire starred in the BBC Three series Massive as Lorraine Finnegan.

Cheshire guest starred in a series 25 episode of Casualty in 2011 as Sandra Orr, the relative of a patient. From 2011 to 2018, Cheshire starred in the Sky sitcom Trollied as customer service representative Sue Benson. She appeared in all seven series, as well as the specials. In 2013, she appeared in five episodes of the BBC soap opera Doctors. Between 2014 and 2016, Cheshire also appeared in the BBC series In the Club as Geraldine for 12 episodes. The actress appeared in a second episode of Casualty in 2015, during the show's twenty-ninth series. In this appearance, she played patient Pam Poole opposite Paul Trussell as Derek Owen. From 2017 to 2022, Cheshire portrayed the role of Lorraine Bird in the Channel 4 school drama Ackley Bridge.

Cheshire died on 19 December 2025, at the age of 65. Her death was announced by her husband John Dixon on social media, whom she had been married to since 1979.

== Filmography ==
Year	Title	Role	Notes
1999	Stanton Blues	Jo Warren	2 episodes
2001	Phoenix Nights	Aerobics Woman	1 episode
2001	Clocking Off	Mad Beryl	1 episode
2001	Vacuuming Completely Nude in Paradise	Hot Pot	Television film
2002	Having It Off	Pammy Rocket	1 episode
2002	Harold Shipman: Doctor Death	Canteen Lady	Television film
2002	Mrs. Meitlemihir	Courtyard Woman	Short film
2003–2004	Early Doors	Joan	Main role; 12 episodes
2004	Fat Friends	Nurse	1 episode
2004	No Angels	Press Officer	1 episode
2004	Holby City	Pam Carr	1 episode
2005	Down to Earth	Tricia Jenkins	1 episode
2006	Goldplated	Margaret	1 episode
2006–2007	Tittybangbang	Various	5 episodes
2007	The Afternoon Play	Patty	1 episode
2007	Instinct	Judith	Television film
2007	Life on Mars	Big Bird	1 episode
2007	Sound	Shay's Mum	Television film
2007	The Street	Second Woman	1 episode
2007–2012	Waterloo Road	Fleur Budgen	Recurring role; 10 episodes
2008	Florence Nightingale	Watson	Television film
2008	Sunshine	Joan	1 episode
2008	Massive	Lorraine	6 episodes
2009	The Imaginarium of Doctor Parnassus	Mum	Supporting role
2009	The Royal	Mrs. Hastings	1 episode
2010	Chatroom	Yorkshire Housewife	Supporting role
2010	Poor Wee Me	Betty	Film
2011	In with the Flynns	Mrs. Barton	1 episode
2011	Casualty	Sandra Orr	1 episode "Momentum"
2011–2018	Trollied	Sue	Main role; 63 episodes
2013	The Johnny and Inel Show	Vacuum Lady	1 episode
2013	Doctors	Vanessa Harding	5 episodes
2014–2016	In the Club	Geraldine	Main role; 12 episodes
2015	Casualty	Pam Poole	1 episode "Knock Knock Who's There?"
2016	The Life of Rock with Brian Pern	Train Driver	1 episode
2016	Moving On	Kim	1 episode
2017–2022	Ackley Bridge	Lorraine Bird	Main role; 39 episodes
2022	Incompatible	Nurse	Short film
