= Christine Bottomley =

English actress (born 1979)

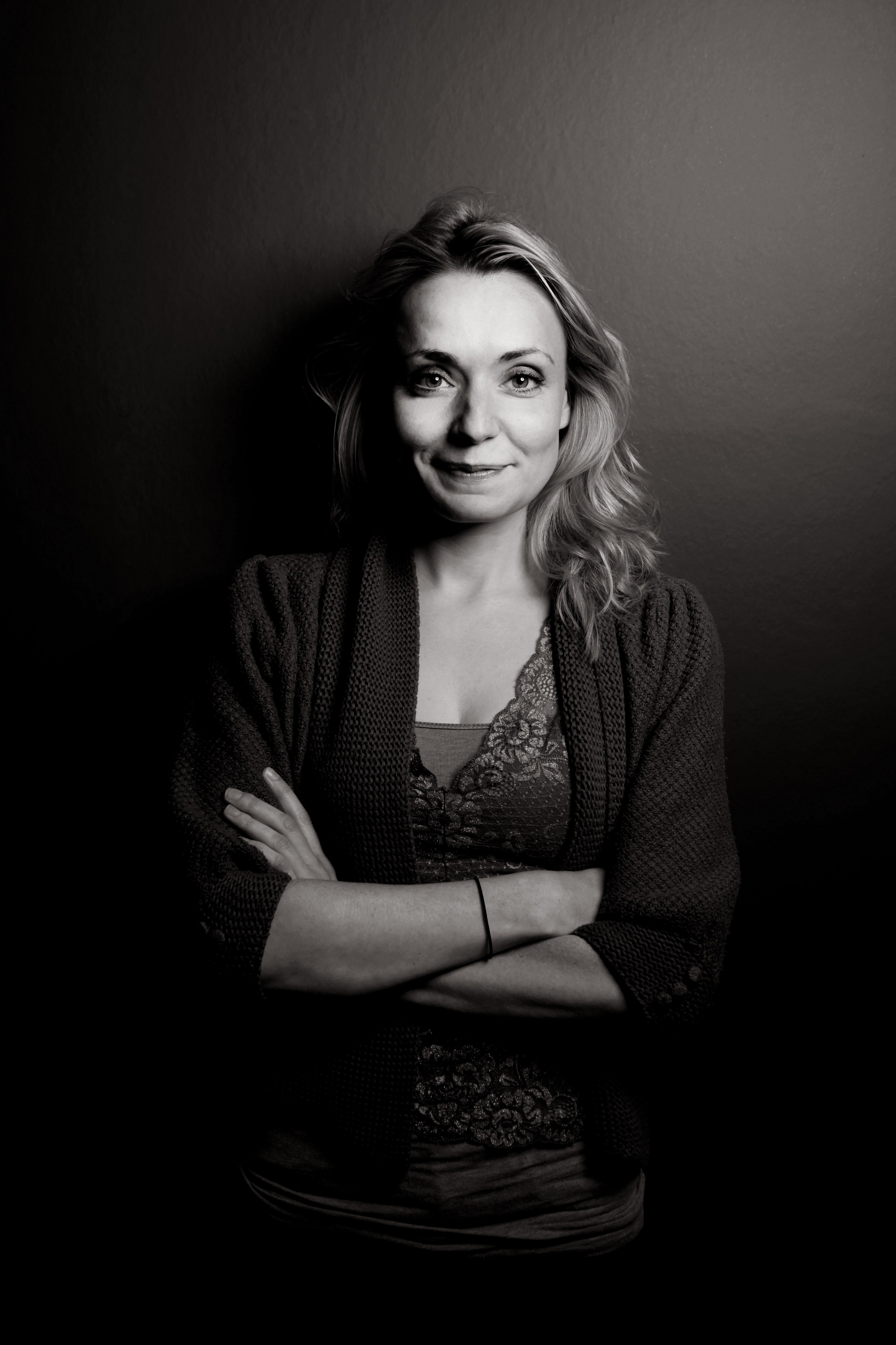
- Bottomley in 2012
- Born: 27 April 1979 (age 47); Rochdale, Greater Manchester, England
- Education: Royal Scottish Academy of Music and Drama (2001)
- Occupation: Actress
- Years active: 2001–present
- Known for: Early Doors; Back to Life; The End of the F***ing World

Christine Bottomley (born 27 April 1979) is an English actress. Her television roles include playing Kirsty in EastEnders (2001), Melanie in Early Doors (2003–2004), Susie Ward in Heartbeat (2003), and Zoey Wyatt in Shameless (2006). Other credits include Massive (2008), Hope Springs (2009), Land Girls (2009), and Hush (2008).

More recently she has starred in Fearless (2017), The End of the F***ing World (2017–2019), The Nest (2020), Back to Life (2019–2021), Domina (2021), and Sherwood (2024).

== Early life ==
Christine Bottomley was born in Rochdale, Greater Manchester, and grew up in a flat above the family's chemist shop. She went to several local youth drama groups before embarking on a course at the Royal Scottish Academy of Music and Drama, from where she graduated in 2001.

== Career ==
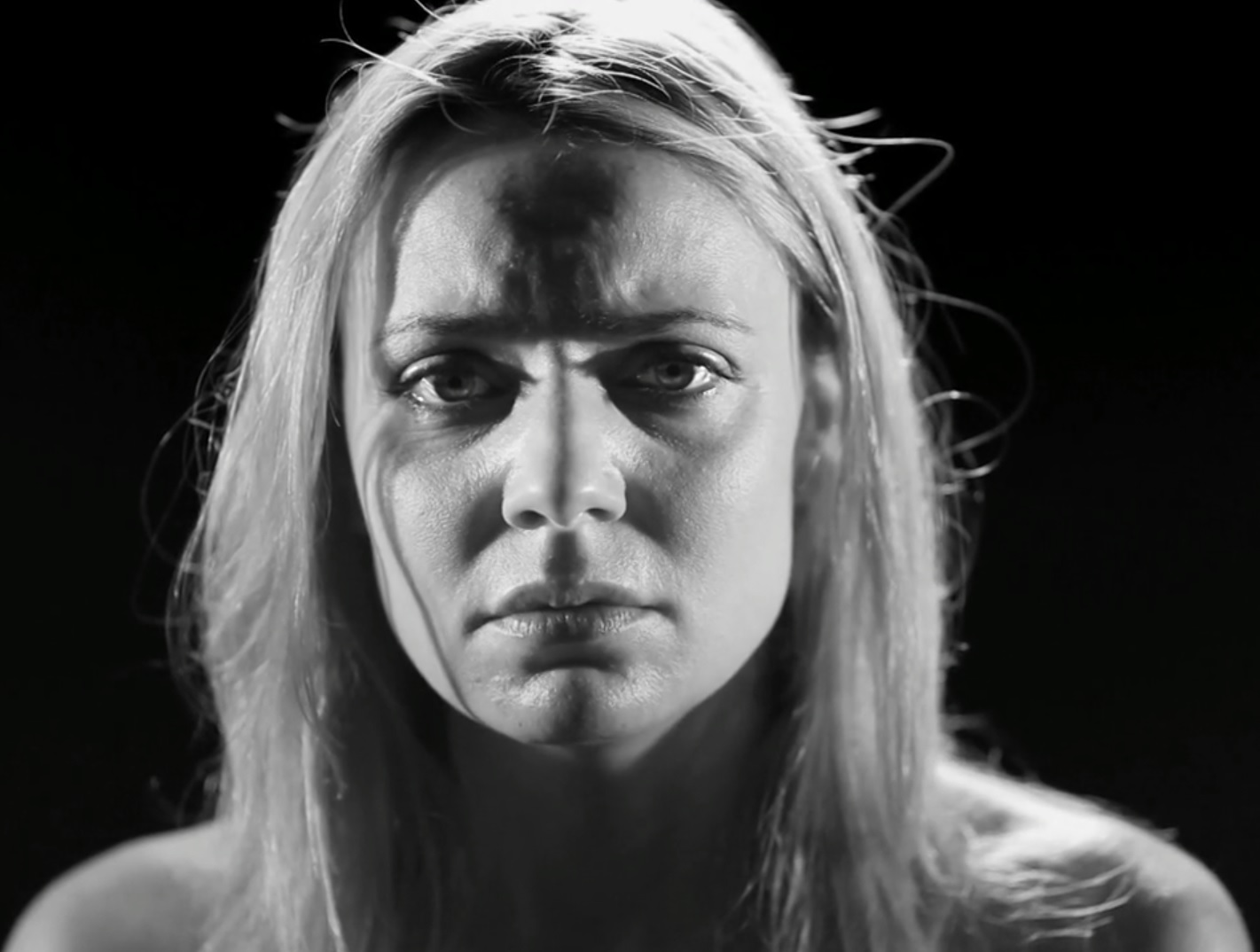
Bottomley in 2012

Following graduation, she made her screen debut as Kirsty in EastEnders (2001). She played a regular role from 2003–2004, as Melanie in the BBC2 sitcom Early Doors. Bottomley has had numerous parts on television, including episodes of the second series of Torchwood (2008), the comedy series Massive (2008), the drama series Hope Springs (2009), and Land Girls (2009). One of her first film roles was in Hush, in 2008.

In 2010, she was nominated for Best New Actress at the London Film Critic's Circle Awards for her portrayal of Lisa Thompson in The Arbor. She is a three-times winner of Best Actress at the BBC Audio Drama Awards; in 2014 for My Boy; 2017 for The Sky is Wider, and 2018 for Solitary.

== Filmography ==
=== Film ===
Year	Title	Role	Notes
2006	Venus	Hospital Nurse	
2007	The Waiting Room	Fiona	
2007	Death of a Socialist	Alice	Short film
2008	Hush	Beth	
2010	The Arbor	Lisa Thompson	
2010	Little White Lies	Mum	Short film
2011	Lost Christmas	Helen	
2012	All in Good Time	Molly Batt	
2012	Strawberry Fields	Emily	
2013	Charlie Says	Liz	Short film
2013	Out of Darkness	(unknown)	Short film
2013	Man in the Moon	Scarlet	
2014	Keeping Rosy	Sarah	
2017	Cowboy Dave	Debbie	Short film
2017	Funny Cow	Funny Calf's Mum	
2018	Peterloo	Female Reformer	
2022	Typist Artist Pirate King	Joan	
2024	Robin and the Hoods	Bridget	
2024	What I Am	Caroline	Short film
2025	Misper	Pam Shade	
2025	The Healer	Helen	Short film

=== Television ===
Year	Title	Role	Notes
2001	EastEnders	Kirsty	4 episodes
2002	The Inspector Lynley Mysteries	Bride	Episode: "Missing Joseph"
2002	Holby City	Danni Simmons	Episode: "High Risk"
2002	The Bill	Sandie	Recurring role; 5 episodes (series 18)
2002	Dalziel and Pascoe	Christine Fitzgerald	Episode: "For Love Nor Money"
2003	Burn It	Girl in Pub	Series 1; episode 6 (uncredited role)
2003	Heartbeat	Susie Ward	Recurring role; 5 episodes (series 12)
2003	Grease Monkeys	Tracie	Episode: "Girl Crazy"
2003–2004	Early Doors	Melanie	Series regular; 11 episodes (series 1 & 2)
2004	Sex, Footballers and Videotape	Mel	TV film
2004	Murder Prevention	Sally Brook	2 episodes: "False Prophet: Parts 1 & 2"
2005	Comedy Lab	(unknown)	Episode: "Speeding"
2006	Shameless	Zoe Wyatt	Episode: "Dark Friends"
2006	The Street	Yvonne O'Neill	Series regular; 6 episodes
2006	Vincent	Selina Kenyon	Series 2, episode 1
2006	Simon Schama's Power of Art	Fillide	Episode: "Caravaggio"
2006	Blue Murder	Mandy Breeley	Episode: "Make Believe"
2006–2007	The Innocence Project	Sarah Shawcross	Series regular; 8 episodes
2007	Instinct	Milly	TV film
2007	Sound	Lou	TV film
2007	Sea of Souls	Mary Dunbar	2 episodes: "The Prayer Tree: Parts 1 & 2"
2008	The Palace	Natalie	Recurring role; 3 episodes
2008	Torchwood	Maggie	Episode: "A Day in the Death"
2008	Tess of the D'Urbervilles	Kate	Recurring role; 3 episodes
2008	Massive	Lou	Series regular; 6 episodes
2009	Hope Springs	Shoo Coggan	Series regular; 8 episodes
2009	Land Girls	Annie Barratt	Series regular; 5 episodes
2010	Survivors	Clare	Series 2, episode 5
2010	The Secret Diaries of Miss Anne Lister	Ann Walker	TV film
2011	Midsomer Murders	Blaze Leadbetter	Episode: "The Oblong Murders"
2011	In with the Flynns	Sarah	Episode: "Whistleblowing"
2011	Inspector George Gently	Terri Molloy	Episode: "Goodbye China"
2011	Moving On	Caroline	Episode: "Tour of Duty"
2012	Secrets and Words	Valerie King	Episode: "Help Me If You Can"
2013	Silent Witness	DI Kate Warren	2 episodes: "True Love Waits: Parts 1 & 2"
2013	Great Night Out	Julie	Series regular; 6 episodes
2013	Frankie	Diane Preston	Series 1, episode 3
2013	New Tricks	Becky Belgrade	Episode: "Into the Woods"
2013	Vera	Lisa Strachan	Episode: "Prodigal Son"
2014	DCI Banks	Katy Heath	2 episodes: "Wednesday's Child: Parts 1 & 2"
2014	Undeniable	Emma Rawlins	TV mini-series; 2 episodes
2014–2016	In the Club	Vicky Brierly	Series regular; 12 episodes (series 1 & 2)
2015	Cucumber	Lynne	Series 1, episode 3
2017	Fearless	Jenna Brooks	Series regular; 6 episodes
2017	The Tunnel	Helena Carver	Recurring role; 2 episodes (series 3)
2017–2019	The End of the F***ing World	Gwen	Recurring role; 10 episodes (series 1 & 2)
2018	Hard Sun	Maggie Sweeting	Episode: "One Thousand, Eight Hundred Days"
2018	Torvill & Dean	Mavis Dean	TV film
2019	Flack	Sally Henderson	Episode: "Anthony"
2019–2021	Back to Life	Mandy	Series regular; 11 episodes (series 1 & 2)
2020	The Nest	Zoe	Series regular; 5 episodes
2021–2023	Domina	Scribonia	Series regular; 13 episodes (series 1 & 2)
2022	Silent Witness	Florence Clarke	Episode: "History: Part 3"
2024	Sherwood	Rachel Crossley	Main role; 6 episodes (series 2)
2024	Ridley	Katharine Penrose	2 episodes: "A Sleeping Tiger: Parts 1 & 2"
2024	The Wives	Annabelle Morgan	2 episodes (series 1)
2025	Waterloo Road	Samantha Drake	2 episodes (series 16)
2025	Shakespeare & Hathaway: Private Investigators	Rina Shrewsbury	Episode: "Such a Mad Marriage Never Was Before"
2026	Shetland	Emily Linden	6 episodes (series 11)
2027	Nightsleeper	Tanya	1 episode (series 2)

== Radio ==
Year	Date	Title	Role	Strand	Station
2004	29 November	Double Acts: Scissors and Ribbon	Lisa	Afternoon Play	BBC Radio 4
2007	23 February	Money Magic	Kathy	Friday Drama	BBC Radio 4
2008	15–22 March	The Dark Side	Annie	Saturday Drama	BBC Radio 4
2011–2012	June 2011 – October 2012	Everyone Quite Likes Justin	Lisa	Comedy	BBC Radio 4 Extra
2012	17 March	"Tony Teardrop"	Carly	The Wire	BBC Radio 3
2012	19 December	My Boy	Lisa		BBC Radio 4
2013	12 March	Meic Povey – Take me to Hafod Owen	Vicky		BBC Radio 4
2013	1 October	Man in the Moon	Scarlet		BBC Radio 4
2013	11–15 November	Children in Need: Holding on to you	Jo	15 Minute Drama	BBC Radio 4
2014	31 January – 3 February	Tony Teardrop	Carly		BBC Radio 4
2014	2 March	Lorca's Rural Trilogy	Martirio	Drama on 3	BBC Radio 3
2014	15 June	Writing Lives: Treats	Reader		BBC Radio 4
2014	30 November	Dream of White Horses	Sarah	Drama on 3	BBC Radio 3
2015	25–29 May	Amicable	Sally	15 Minute Drama	BBC Radio 4
2015	29 May	Time for One More Question	Melanie		BBC Radio 4
2015	11–18 October	Reading Europe – Poland: Entanglement	Olga Kuzniecow		BBC Radio 4
2015	28–29 November	Blood, Sex and Money	Severine		BBC Radio 4
2016	6–7 July	States of Mind	Ella	Afternoon Play	BBC Radio 4
2016	25 September	Peter the Great: The Gamblers	Sophia	Tsar	BBC Radio 4 Extra
2016	22 October	Between Ballards Ears	Actor	Between the Ears	BBC Radio 3
2016	11 December	The Tidebreak	Mrs Williams	Drama on 3	BBC Radio 3
2017	7 July	The Archivist	Clare		BBC Radio 4
2017	7 October	Solitary	Mandy	Between the Ears	BBC Radio 3
2018	8–19 January	Stone (series 7)	Sarah		BBC Radio 4
2018	22 January – 2 February	The Truth About Hawaii	Lizzie	15 Minute Drama	BBC Radio 4
2018	1–9 May	The Wings of the Dove	Susie Stringer	Henry James	BBC Radio 4 Extra
2018	9 July	My Mother's Daughter	Helen		BBC Radio 4
2019	26 February	Debbie Purdy	Debbie Purdy	Test Case	BBC Radio 4 Extra
2019	30 April	What's He Building in There?	Kate		BBC Radio 4
2019	17–21 June	Reading Europe – Lullaby	Louise		BBC Radio 4
2019	14 July	The Masque of Anarchy		Drama on 3	BBC Radio 3
2019	27 September	This Changeling Self	She		BBC Radio 4
2019	6 October	The Mother	Karpov / The Landlady	Drama on 3	BBC Radio 3
2019	28 November	Monique & Me	Adult Cara		BBC Radio 4
2019	24 December	The Christmas Present	Holly		BBC Radio 4
2020	3–13 February	24 Kildare Road	Hayley		BBC Radio 4
2021	2 March	The Ventriloquist's Dummy	Jess		BBC Radio 4
2021	18 April	Killer	Dani	Drama on 3	BBC Radio 3
2022	18–26 January	Money, Sex and Blood (series 3)	Maria	Fault Lines	BBC Radio 4
2022	29 March	Waterloo Station	Christa		BBC Radio 4

== Theatre credits ==
Year	Title	Role	Venue	Ref
2000	The Pleasureman	Various roles	Citizens Theatre, Glasgow	
2001	Dracula	Lucy Westerman	Royal Scottish Academy of Music and Drama	
2004	Ladybird	Lera	Royal Court Theatre, London	
2004	Flush	Holly	Soho Theatre, London	
2005	Rutherford and Son	Mary	Royal Exchange Theatre, Manchester	
2005	Osama the Hero	Mandy	Hampstead Theatre, London	
2005	A Single Act	Michelle	Hampstead Theatre, London	
2007	Alaska	Emma	Royal Court Theatre, London	
2009	Uncle Vanya	Sonya	Young Vic, London	
2015	How To Hold Your Breath	Jasmine	Royal Court Theatre, London	

== Awards ==
Year	Work	Award	Category	Result	Ref.
2010	The Arbor	London Film Critics' Circle Awards	Best Supporting Actress	Nominated	
2014	My Boy	BBC Audio Drama Awards	Best Actress	Won	
2017	States of Mind: The Sky is Wider	BBC Audio Drama Awards	Best Actress	Won	
2018	Solitary	BBC Audio Drama Awards	Best Actress	Won	
