= John Lanigan (hurler) =

Irish hurler

Personal information
- Native name: Seán Ó Lonagáin (Irish)
- Born: 17 June 1912 Rossmore, County Tipperary, Ireland
- Died: October 1988 (aged 76) Thurles, County Tipperary, Ireland

Sport
- Sport: Hurling
- Position: Left wing-back
Club
- Years: Club
- Thurles Sarsfields
Club titles
- Tipperary titles: 4
Inter-county
- Years: County
- 1936–1940: Tipperary
Inter-county titles
- Munster titles: 0
- All-Irelands: 0
- NHL: 0

John Lanigan (17 June 1912 – October 1988) was an Irish hurler. His league and championship career with the Tipperary senior team lasted five seasons from 1936 to 1940.

Born in Rossmore, County Tipperary, Lanigan enjoyed his first hurling successes with Thurles CBS. Here he won a Harty Cup medal. Lanigan first appeared for the Thurles Sarsfields club at juvenile and underage levels. He eventually joined the club's senior team winning four county championship medals.

Lanigan made his debut on the inter-county scene when he was selected for the Tipperary minor team in 1929. He enjoyed two championship seasons with the minor team, culminating with the winning of an All-Ireland medal in 1930. Lanigan was added to the Tipperary senior team for the 1936 championship and was a member of the team for the following five seasons.

In retirement from playing, Lanigan became involved in team management and coaching. As manager and selector with the Thurles Sarsfields senior team he helped the team to win ten county championship medals between 1955 and 1965. Lanigan was an All-Ireland-winning selector with the Tipperary senior team in 1971.
