= Trollied =

Television series

- Genre: Sitcom
- Created by: Anne Marie O'Connor; Paul Doolan; Ash Atalla
- Showrunner: Anne Marie O’Connor
- Written by: Various
- Directed by: Paul Walker; Jonathan Gershfield; Paul Murphy; Paul Harrison
- Starring: Jason Watkins; Jane Horrocks; Mark Addy; Chanel Cresswell; Nick Blood; Joel Fry; Carl Rice; Beverly Rudd; Rita May; Lorraine Cheshire; Faye McKeever; Stephanie Beacham; Dominic Coleman; Chris Geere; Stephen Tompkinson; Sarah Parish
- Country of origin: United Kingdom
- Original language: English
- No. of series: 7 (+5 Specials)
- No. of episodes: 71 (list of episodes)

Production
- Producers: Sue Howells; Rachel Salter; Alexander Smith
- Editors: Mark Davies; Nick Ames; Tim Marchant; Nigel Cattle
- Running time: 30 minutes (inc. adverts); 60 minutes (inc. adverts)(Christmas Specials)
- Production company: Roughcut TV

Original release
- Network: Sky One
- Release: 4 August 2011 – 23 December 2018

Trollied is a British television sitcom about employees in a fictional supermarket named "Valco", which debuted on Sky One on 4 August 2011 and ended on 23 December 2018. The series was filmed in a purpose-built replica supermarket in the Bottle Yard Studios in Bristol throughout April and May 2011 for the first series with the second series being filmed in June and July 2012.

At the conclusion of series 1, Sky 1 confirmed that the series had been recommissioned for two additional series of 13 episodes each, and a Christmas Special in 2012. The third series began airing from 22 August 2013 and ended on 7 November 2013. A second Christmas Special for 2013 aired on 24 December 2013. On 20 March 2014 it was announced that Sky had commissioned a fourth series of Trollied which aired in October 2014. The fourth series started filming in Bristol in June 2014 and began transmission on 3 November 2014 and concluded on 22 December 2014. A fifth series began airing on 2 November 2015 and ended on 14 December 2015. A Christmas Special aired on 23 December 2015. In April 2016, Jason Watkins confirmed that a sixth series had been commissioned, with filming to begin in June. A sixth series began airing on 7 November 2016, ending with a Christmas Special on 19 December 2016. A seventh series began filming on 11 July 2017, with a Christmas Special set to precede it. On 28 November 2017, it was announced that the Christmas Special would air on 24 December 2017. A seventh series began airing on 2 January 2018. On 23 August 2018, it was announced that Trollied would end with a final Christmas special, which broadcast on 23 December 2018.

== Plot summary ==
The show takes place in the fictional supermarket of Valco in Warrington, Cheshire, where the hapless staff deal with the everyday problems of running a value supermarket in the north west of England. The show explores the relationships between the staff, customers and managers as romances and rivalries blossom on the shop floor, along with a realistic supermarket atmosphere that customers and store employees in reality can relate to. This includes customer stereotypes and rivalries with other store branches such as Valco in Wigan.

Originally the show was going to be set in Bradford, West Yorkshire where the creator Anne Marie O'Connor is from.

== Cast and characters ==
- Gavin Strong (portrayed by Jason Watkins) — Gavin is Valco's store manager and a long-term employee of the company. He is mild-mannered and dedicated to his work. He is a widower and it has taken sometime for him to find love again. He was clueless to the fact that his deputy manager, Julie Cook, was attracted to him and he later became romantically involved with members of staff including Anna and Cheryl. He briefly left Valco's store in Warrington to take up the position of area manager of the entire Valco chain, but later returned. (Series 1–7)
- Julie Cook (portrayed by Jane Horrocks) — Julie had worked at Valco since leaving school. She was often disliked by her fellow co-workers due to her bitter attitude which was attributed to the fact that her fiancé left her for another woman; however, they later warm to her when she begins to show her softer side. Julie is offered the permanent position of deputy manager when Leanne takes maternity leave and decides not to return. She had secretly been in love with store manager, Gavin Strong, since joining the Valco team and had often attempted to gain his affections. At a Christmas party, her final attempt was once again unsuccessful, only this time Gavin discovered she was in love with him. She decided to leave Valco and later became co-store manager of Widnes. She later returned to briefly visit Gavin at Valco for Christmas. (Series 1–3, guest Series 5)
- Andy Richmond (portrayed by Mark Addy) — Andy was head butcher at Valco for many years and has worked alongside Kieran at the meat counter. He sees himself as a ladies man and would often take fun in winding up the staff and customers alike. When Andy is later reunited with Sarah, 'the one that got away' he decided to choose her over his job and leaves Valco to start a new life with Sarah in Scarborough. (Series 1–3)
- Katie McVey (portrayed by Chanel Cresswell) — Katie was originally a checkout operator at Valco, and later went on working as a kiosk assistant, and then a checkout supervisor. She became romantically involved with Kieran, the butcher, and both left Valco to start a new life together. However, it is revealed that she and Kieran broke up and Katie soon returned upon receiving the position of HR manager and later working her way up to her current position as deputy store manager. She found love for a second time at Valco with Daniel Wilson. (Series 1–3, Series 5–7)
- Kieran (portrayed by Nick Blood) — Kieran was deputy butcher as Valco, and has worked with Andy and the meat counter, which whom he finds annoying to work with but at the same time they have become the best of mates. He is attracted to Katie, and later they get together and both decide to leave Valco. (Series 1–3)
- Leighton (portrayed by Joel Fry) — Leighton was a store assistant and his career is his whole life. He is friendly, hard-working and optimistic, while he is also simple and gullible. He loves the attention of his co-workers and is needy of Valco's customers. (Series 1–3)
- Colin (portrayed by Carl Rice) — Colin was initially store assistant. He attempts to get away with doing as little work as possible and all he is interesting in is smoking, drinking and getting tattoos and he has a filthy mind. It appeared that he loathed his co-worker, Lisa; however, it seems they are the perfect match as they are alike in many ways and later start their own family. (Series 1–7)
- Lisa (portrayed by Beverly Rudd) — Lisa is a checkout operator at Valco. She hates just about everyone, is crude and is not at all interested in her job. It initially appears that she loathes Colin the most, but it soon becomes evident that they make the perfect couple and often sneak off to have sex and aren't the least bit shy in sharing the sordid details with their co-workers. She and Colin have now started their own family. (Series 1–7)
- Margaret (portrayed by Rita May) — Margaret received the position at Valco as part of a senior citizens work scheme. She was a housewife for many years and now that her children have all grown up and left home, she has decided to get out more and beginning at Valco was the first step. At first she is a deli counter assistant and works her way up to her current position as pharmacy assistant. She is easily confused and very forgetful, regularly testing the patience of her co-workers, but she is also warm and friendly in nature. She has been married to Alan, who is never seen, for 50 years and regularly talks about him. (Series 1–7)
- Sue Benson (portrayed by Lorraine Cheshire) — Sue is a customer service assistant and best friend to her co-worker, Linda, with whom she regularly gossips with about the other staff members and customers. Sue is a mother of three and later discovers she is pregnant with her fourth child. (Series 1–7)
- Linda Stubbings (portrayed by Faye McKeever) — Linda is co-customer service assistant and best friend to Sue. She spent three years with Neville, but the pair split, later reuniting in the Christmas day 2018 episode. (Series 1–7)
- Lorraine Chain (portrayed by Stephanie Beacham) — Lorraine replaced Gavin as store manager and launched the new 'No Nonsense' food range to Valco. She was plain-speaking and often crude with her overuse of the word 'bastard' and later turned on several members of staff, including Leighton and Andy, and those who didn't didn't follow her strict view of how Valco should be run. Her verbal abuse toward Julie caused her to suffer a nervous breakdown and take a temporary leave of absence. Lorraine was later fired from her position and Gavin returned to the job. (Series 2)
- Neville (portrayed by Dominic Coleman) — Neville is divorcee father of two and has lost everything to his ex-wife and therefore is forced to start again from the ground up taking a job a Valco. Initially starting as a kiosk assistant, Neville works his way up checkout operator and is currently working as a butcher. He found love with Linda, with her soon finding him too much to bear. Most of his Valco colleagues find him annoyingly dull and take advantage of his passive nature, especially Colin and Lisa. He reunities with Linda in the Christmas day 2018 special. (Series 2–7)
- Sharon (portrayed by Jo Enright) — Sharon was head baker and often enjoyed pranking her co-workers. (Series 2)
- Ian (portrayed by Victor McGuire) — Ian becomes Valco's security guard. He is inexperienced in his work, as he is not the best judge of character when it comes to criminals and is very trusting. He is gay and married. (Series 2–6)
- Richard France (portrayed by Chris Geere) — Richard became Valco's new head of strategy and received the position in order to modernize the chain; however, his ideas began to clash with Gavin's view of how the company should be run and it became evident that Richard was trying to push Gavin out. Richard was soon dismissed from the job. (Series 3)
- Dave (portrayed by Danny Kirrane) — Dave was a fishmonger on the supermarket fish counter. He had no experience working with fish but was enthusiastic about his work. (Series 3)
- Ray (portrayed by Adeel Akhtar) — Ray was fishmonger at Valco and was obsessed with fish, and very much the opposite of his assistant, Dave, who had no knowledge of fish whatsoever. Ray and Dave, at first, do not get along, as Dave views Ray as weird but they eventually begin to hit it off. (Series 3)
- Anna (portrayed by Elizabeth Bower) — Anna is Spanish and was checkout operator at Valco. She was Gavin's girlfriend and took the job just so she could be close to him, much to Julie's dismay. (Series 3)
- Daniel Wilson (portrayed by Samuel Anderson) — Daniel joined Valco as assistant manager to Gavin and the two get along very well. He fell for Charlie, and following her departure, he became romantically involved with co-worker, Katie. (Series 4–6)
- Rose (portrayed by Miriam Margolyes) — Rose became a checkout operator at Valco, and happens to be Colin's nan. She wants the best for Colin. Lisa, his girlfriend, does not meet Rose's expectations. (Series 4)
- Charlotte "Charlie" O'Connor (portrayed by Aisling Bea) — Charlie is the daughter of Brendan O'Connor, the owner of the entire Valco chain who believes that she should learn the business. She is dim-witted and oblivious to work concepts. Daniel is responsible for showing her the ropes and the two eventually begin to hit it off. (Series 4–5)
- Harry (portrayed by Jack Carroll) — Harry is a checkout operator. He is probably the brightest person at Valco having nine A* in his GCSEs. He is sarcastic and has a crush on Linda. (Series 4–7)
- Brian (portrayed by Stephen Tompkinson) — Brian becomes the new pharmacist at Valco; having previously worked for Boots, he has decided not to reveal why he left. (Series 4–7)
- Cheryl Fairweather (portrayed by Sarah Parish) — Cheryl is the manager of rival chain Lauda, a new store opening directly opposite Valco. There is instant chemistry between Cheryl and Gavin and the pair eventually become an item. She later joins the Valco team as regional manager, becoming Gavin's boss. (Series 5–7)
- Heather (portrayed by Jessie Cave) — Heather is a store assistant at Valco. She is young, innocent, and naive. She also has a crush on Gavin. (Series 5–7)
- Duncan Trench (portrayed by Rufus Hound) — Duncan was the representative of Pleasure Foods Sales, a new line of food products within Valco. He is annoying and arrogant and slowly driving Gavin mad. (Series 6)
- Holly (portrayed by Georgia May Foote) — Holly is a Valco employee from another store and immediately takes an interest in Daniel. She is extremely jealous and Katie begins to see a dark side to her sweet nature. (Series 6)
- Shai (portrayed by Nikhil Parmar) — Shai becomes Valco's newest store assistant and seems to have no common sense or social skills whatsoever. (Series 6–7)
- Donna Calabrese (portrayed by Jessica Gunning) — Donna becomes Valco's new security guard. Taking the job far too seriously, like Ian she still can't manage to do it quite right. (Series 7)
- Lou Chettle (portrayed by Sally Phillips) — Possibly the most inept employee Valco has ever hired, Lou is hired as night manager when Valco becomes a 24-hour store, for which trouble ensues. (Series 7)
- Craig (portrayed by Danny Mac) — Craig is a store assistant at Valco and is briefly Linda's boyfriend. (Series 7)

=== Notable guest appearances ===
Guest appearances on the series include, Louise Redknapp (2011), Ian Botham (2012), Kelly Brook (2013), Geri Halliwell (2013), Carol Vorderman (2014), Kay Burley (2014), Andrew Flintoff (2014), and Richard Wilson (2015).

== Location ==
The series was filmed on a set built by Sky TV at the Bottle Yard Studios in Bristol, UK. Between series 3 & 4, the BBC2 motoring entertainment show Top Gear destroyed some of the set by driving through it with three 1980's era hatchbacks. The segment aired on Top Gear Series 21, Episode 1.

Trollied episode 'The Wedding', was partly filmed at the cruise terminal at the Port of Dover, which was used as the location for the Dublin and Holyhead Ferry Ports in scenes which sees Gavin (Jason Watkins) and the others panicking they are going to miss his & Cheryl’s (Sarah Parish) wedding.

== International broadcast ==
Trollied was broadcast in Australia on Network Ten, first airing Thursday nights from 27 September 2012 at 11.15 pm. However, Network Ten stopped broadcasting the series, and instead, all seven series became available to view on the Australian streaming service Stan. Series 6 became available to the service as of 6 January 2017, while Series 7 started in April 2018.

In the United States, the show airs on selected PBS affiliates. Although not a direct adaptation of Trollied, NBC previewed their new comedy series Superstore on 30 November 2015. Many have seen Superstore as the American equivalent of Trollied.

== Reception ==
=== Critical reception ===
Following the debut of Trollied, Ian Richardson, manager of the Morrisons supermarket in Thornbury, Bradford, wrote an article in The Guardian newspaper, saying the show was the topic of the discussion in the staff canteen and that he felt the attention to detail on the set was excellent, making a realistic setting. In Mr Richardson's article he commented that the show portrayed many similarities with his supermarket, but he could not relate to the use of bad language on the shop floor or poor customer service levels. He felt that it was a shame there was not more customer interaction.

Reviews for the series were mixed. In a review for The Guardian, Zoe Williams commented that the series is "A puerile, lazy comedy". On reviewing the first episode, Alice-Azania Jarvis of The Independent said that "In all, it wasn't bad. There was no reason to switch over. No reason to tune out. It was lightly amusing, which is enough for what it was. But it's not going to be something to go out of your way for. It's not appointment TV." Keith Watson of the Metro stated that "Trollied is worth watching but it's the minor characters that make you laugh".

=== Ratings ===
Series	Time slot	Episodes	Premiered		Ended		Ave. viewers (in millions)
Series	Time slot	Episodes	Date	Viewers (in millions)	Date	Viewers (in millions)	Ave. viewers (in millions)
1	Thursday 9:00PM	8	4 August 2011	2.00	15 September 2011	0.94	1.15
2	Friday 9:00PM	13	31 August 2012	0.76	16 November 2012	0.61	0.72
3	Thursday 9:00PM	13	22 August 2013	0.75	7 November 2013	0.53	0.58
4	Monday 8:30PM	8	3 November 2014	0.72	22 December 2014	0.58	0.64
5	Monday 9:00PM	8	2 November 2015	0.58	14 December 2015	0.46	0.53
6	Monday 9:00PM	8	7 November 2016	0.62	19 December 2016	0.61	0.54
7	Tuesday 10:00PM	8	2 January 2018	0.55	20 February 2018	0.32	TBA

== DVD releases ==
The home media distribution rights of Trollied were initially held by Fremantle Home Entertainment, in which they released series one, two and three in individual sets and a collected box set, followed by series four, between 2011 and 2015. After which, rights to the series were acquired by Network, where they released series five, six, a box set comprising the first six series, and finally, series seven, between 2016 and 2018. Following the broadcast of the stand-alone finale episode in December 2018, it remained unreleased on home media until 2023, when Network released it as part of a complete series box set. Following Network's liquidation in 2023, the complete series was made available in 2024 via Old Gold Media/Spirit Entertainment.

DVD title	Release date (Region 2)	No. of episodes	No. of discs	Details	Ref.
Complete Series 1	17 October 2011	8	2	182 minutes; 1.78:1 (16:9) aspect ratio; English Dolby Digital 2.0; English subtitles; Distribution: FremantleMedia (UK); Roadshow Entertainment (Australia); Rating: BBFC: rated 15; ACB: rated MA15+; Special features: "Why I Hate Shopping" (cast and crew interviews); Behind The Scenes; Video Diaries (featuring Nick Blood & Joel Fry); Out Takes; Other release: Region 4 – 21 November 2012 (this is currently the only series to be released in Australia)	
Complete Series 2	31 December 2012	14	2	Includes 2012 Christmas special; 334 minutes; 1.78:1 (16:9) aspect ratio; English Dolby Digital 2.0; English subtitles; FremantleMedia (UK distribution); BBFC: rated 15	
Complete Series 3	30 December 2013	14	2	Includes 2013 Christmas special; 334 minutes; 1.78:1 (16:9) aspect ratio; English Dolby Digital 2.0; English subtitles; FremantleMedia (UK distribution); BBFC: rated 15	
Series 1–3	6 October 2014	36	6	Includes 2012 & 2013 Christmas specials; 850 minutes; 1.78:1 (16:9) aspect ratio; English Dolby Digital 2.0; English subtitles; FremantleMedia (UK distribution); BBFC: rated 15; Special features: see individual releases	
Complete Series 4	5 January 2015	8	1	176 minutes; 1.78:1 (16:9) aspect ratio; English Dolby Digital 2.0; English subtitles; FremantleMedia (UK distribution); BBFC: rated 15	
Complete Series 5	11 January 2016	9	2	Includes 2015 Christmas special; 223 minutes; 1.78:1 (16:9) aspect ratio; English Dolby Digital 2.0; English subtitles; Network (UK distribution); BBFC: rated 12; Special features: 50th Episode behind-the-scenes featurette	
Complete Series 6	13 March 2017	8	1	Includes 2016 Christmas special; 180 minutes; 1.78:1 (16:9) aspect ratio; English Dolby Digital 2.0; English subtitles; Network (UK distribution); BBFC: rated 12	
Complete Series 1–6	17 April 2017	61	10	Includes 2012, 2013, 2015 & 2016 Christmas specials; 1432 minutes; 1.78:1 (16:9) aspect ratio; English Dolby Digital 2.0; English subtitles; Network (UK distribution); BBFC: rated 15; Special features: see individual releases	
Complete Series 7	12 November 2018	9	2	Includes 2017 Christmas special; 222 minutes; 1.78:1 (16:9) aspect ratio; English Dolby Digital 2.0; English subtitles; Network (UK distribution); BBFC: rated 15	
The Complete Series	24 April 2023	71	13	Includes 2012, 2013, 2015, 2016, 2017 & 2018 Christmas specials; 1691 minutes; 1.78:1 (16:9) aspect ratio; English Dolby Digital 2.0; English subtitles; Network (UK distribution); BBFC: rated 15; Special features: see individual releases	
The Complete Series (reissue)	22 July 2024	71	13	Includes 2012, 2013, 2015, 2016, 2017 & 2018 Christmas specials; 1691 minutes; 1.78:1 (16:9) aspect ratio; English Dolby Digital 2.0; English subtitles; Old Gold Media/Spirit Entertainment (UK distribution); BBFC: rated 15; Special features: see individual releases	
