= Damian Lanigan =

British writer

Damian Lanigan is a British writer. He has written two novels - Stretch, 29 and The Chancers. He is the writer and series creator of BBC Three sitcom Massive. He wrote the play Dissonance, which debuted at the Williamstown Theater Festival in 2007 before being premiered in New York City at the Bay Street Theater, Sag Harbor in 2010.
