= Joel Fry (actor) =

English actor and musician

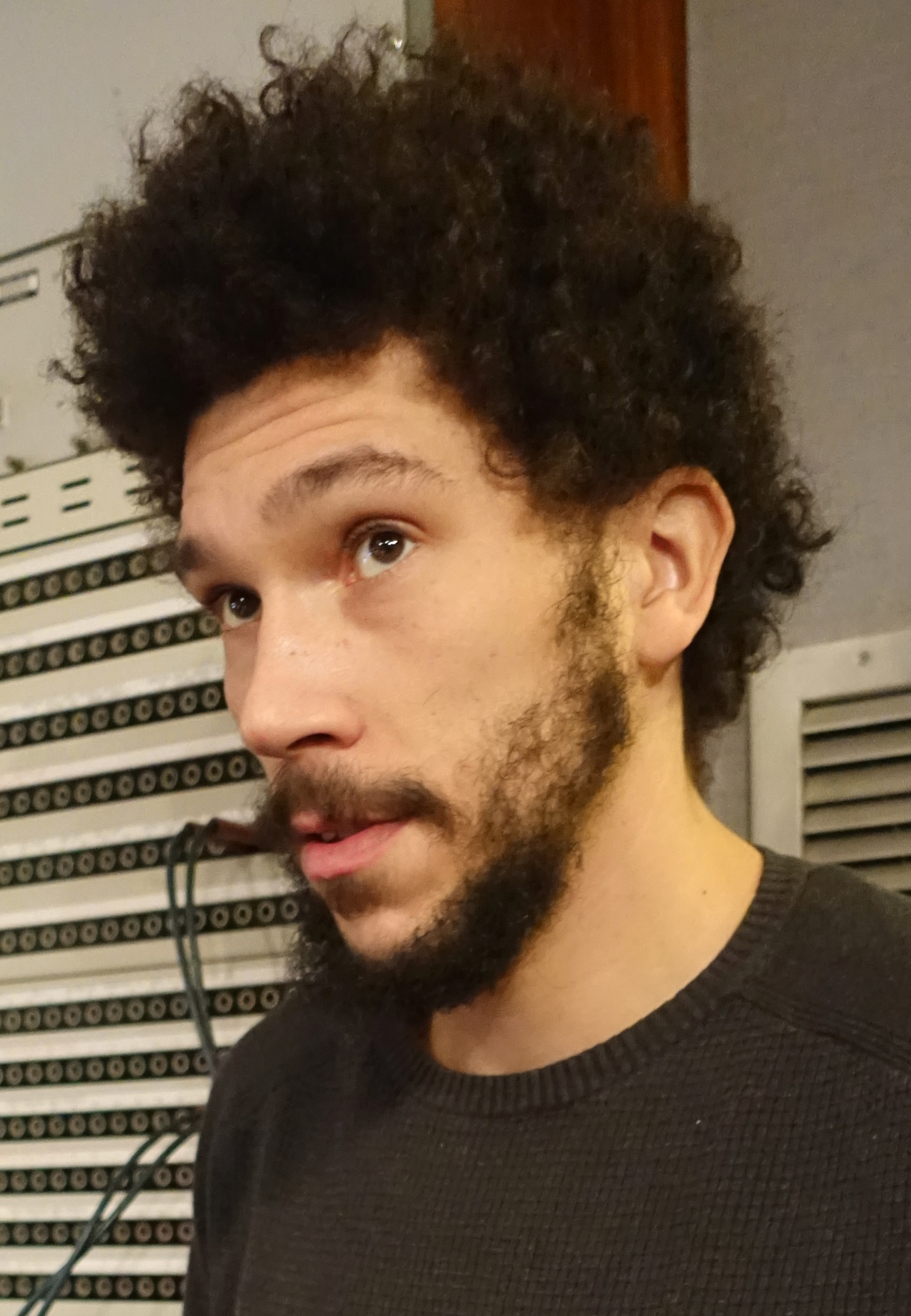
- Fry in 2017
- Born: 1984 or 1985 (age 41–42); London, England
- Education: Royal Academy of Dramatic Art
- Occupations: Actor, musician
- Years active: 2006–present

Joel Fry (born 1984 or 1985) is a British actor and musician. On television, he is known for his roles in the BBC series White Van Man (2011–2012), Twenty Twelve (2012) and W1A (2014–2017); the sitcoms Trollied (2011–2013) and Plebs (2013–2016) on Sky One and ITV; and the HBO series Game of Thrones (2014–2015) and Our Flag Means Death (2022–2023). His films include 10,000 BC (2008), Yesterday (2019), and Bank of Dave (2023).

== Career ==
From London, Fry studied acting at the Royal Academy of Dramatic Art (RADA), graduating with a BA in Acting degree in 2005.

On television, he is known for portraying the characters Hizdahr zo Loraq in the series Game of Thrones and Frenchie in Our Flag Means Death. Further television credits include White Van Man, Trollied, Plebs, Twenty Twelve, and W1A. In film, he appeared as Lu'kibu in 10,000 BC, Rocky in the 2019 romantic comedy film Yesterday, and Jasper Badun in the 2021 crime comedy-drama Cruella.

In 2023, Fry starred in a main role as 'Hugh', the solicitor to Burnley banker Dave Fishwick (played by Rory Kinnear) in the film Bank of Dave, released on Netflix in January 2023.

In 2024, Fry played Antonio in London's Trafalgar Theatre production of The Duchess of Malfi.

== Music ==
Fry is a former member of the band Animal Circus, which released the EP Snakes and Ladders in 2012, and is featured in two songs on the 2022 Our Flag Means Death soundtrack, where he performs as his character, Frenchie.

== Filmography ==
=== Film ===
Year	Title	Role	Notes
2008	10,000 BC	Lu'kibu	
2010	Tamara Drewe	Steve Culley	
2017	Paddington 2	Postman Joe	
2018	Benjamin	Stephen	
2019	Denmark	The Captain	
2019	Yesterday	Rocky	
2020	Love, Wedding, Repeat	Bryan	
2020	Silent Night	Seamus	
2021	Cruella	Jasper Badun	
2021	In the Earth	Dr. Martin Lowery	
2021	A Boy Called Christmas	Matt	
2023	Bank of Dave	Hugh	
2023	Haunting of the Queen Mary	Patrick Caulder	
2023	The End We Start From	R	
2024	Paddington in Peru	Postman Joe	
2025	American Sweatshop	Bob	

=== Television ===
Year	Title	Role	Notes
2006, 2009	The Bill	Darrel Cunningham / Baxter Ryan	5 episodes
2008	Massive	Swing	Main cast, 6 episodes
2009	No Signal!	Various characters	6 episodes
2011–2012	White Van Man	Darren	Main cast, 13 episodes
2011–2013	Trollied	Leighton	Main cast, 35 episodes
2012	Twenty Twelve	Karl Marx	Recurring role, 4 episodes
2012	Bedlam	Liam	1 episode
2012	Public Enemies	Darren Nunn	Miniseries, 3 episodes
2013–2016	Plebs	Stylax Rufus Eurysaces	Main cast, 22 episodes
2014–2015	Game of Thrones	Hizdahr zo Loraq	Recurring role, 8 episodes
2014, 2017	W1A	Karl Marx	2 episodes
2015	Death in Paradise	Steve Taylor	1 episode
2015	You, Me and the Apocalypse	Dave Bosley	Miniseries, 10 episodes
2015–2017	Drunk History	Gilbert Gifford & Albert, Prince Consort	2 episodes
2016	Ordinary Lies	Billy 'Toke' Tokington	Main cast, 6 episodes
2018	Requiem	Hal	Miniseries, 6 episodes
2019	This Time with Alan Partridge	Rod	1 episode
2022–2023	Our Flag Means Death	Frenchie	Main cast, 18 episodes
2024	Inside No. 9	Finn	Episode: "Boo to a Goose"
2024	Doctor Who	Trev Simpkins	Episode: "Joy to the World"
2026	Alice and Steve	Daniel	Main cast, 6 episodes

== Discography ==
=== Animal Circus ===
- 2012 – Snakes and Ladders

=== Accolades ===
Year	Award	Category	Nominee(s)	Result	Ref.
2022	Peabody Awards	Entertainment	Our Flag Means Death	Nominated	
