= Murder of Rhys Jones =

English murder (2007)

Coordinates: 53.449661°N 2.880150°W

- Undated photograph of Jones
- Date: 22 August 2007
- Location: Croxteth, Liverpool, England
- Convicted: Sean Mercer
- Charges: Murder
- Verdict: Guilty
- Sentence: Life imprisonment (22 years minimum)

On 22 August 2007, eleven-year-old Rhys Milford Jones was shot dead in Liverpool, England, while walking home from football practice. The murder drew national attention and led to the conviction of Sean Mercer, aged 16 at the time, who was sentenced to life imprisonment with a minimum term of 22 years.

== Background ==
Rhys Jones was the second-born son of Stephen and Melanie Jones. He had one brother, Owen (born 1990). Rhys, who would have turned 12 five weeks after his death, had just left Broad Square Primary School on the Norris Green housing estate, and was due to start secondary school at Fazakerley High School in September 2007. His former headteacher and neighbours said he was a friendly and popular boy who loved football.

== Murder ==
Jones, who played for the Fir Tree Boys football club, was on his way home from football practice alone on the evening of 22 August 2007. As he was crossing the Fir Tree pub car park on the Croxteth Park estate, Liverpool, a hooded youth riding a silver mountain bike approached. He then held out a Smith & Wesson handgun at arm's length, firing three shots, later determined to be the wrong bullets for the gun. It was originally believed that one of the shots hit Jones in the neck, but during the trial, the pathologist revealed that the bullet had entered his back above his left shoulder blade and then exited from the front right side of his neck.

Melanie Jones rushed to the scene when she heard that her son had been shot. By the time she had reached him, he was unconscious. Paramedics tried for 90 minutes to resuscitate him, but he was pronounced dead shortly after arriving at Alder Hey Children's Hospital. Local radio station Radio City 96.7's programming on the night of the incident, in particular the 10 pm – 2 am show, was dedicated to an amnesty for witnesses and a talk on gun crime. Radio City also launched their anti-gun-crime campaign (backed by the Jones family), In Rhys's Name Get Guns Off Our Streets, after the incident.

== Arrests and investigation ==
Four people aged between 15 and 19 were arrested and later released in connection with the crime. Two further arrests (both teenagers) were made, but both suspects were soon released on bail pending further enquiries. The police appealed to the public for information, stating that they needed help in finding those who had committed the crime. The murder weapon was described as a black handgun with a long barrel. More than 300 officers and gun crime specialists were deployed in the hunt for the killer.

Steve and Melanie Jones made a fresh appeal for witnesses to come forward on 19 September, four weeks after the murder, which was reconstructed on Crimewatch on 26 September. In the episode, Melanie Jones appealed directly to the murderer's mother to turn her son in. It led to 12 people calling into the programme, all of whom gave police the same name. Despite reports that the killer's name was widely known and had appeared on internet sites and in graffiti, police continued their appeal for witnesses to come forward.

On 15 April 2008, Merseyside police confirmed that 11 people (all aged between 17 and 25) had been arrested in connection with the murder. Six more suspects of a similar age were arrested the next day in connection with the murder; one for murder and the other five for assisting an offender. One of these men had already been charged with possessing a firearm. All six of them were remanded in custody by Liverpool Magistrates on 17 April 2008. Another man was charged in connection with the case on 18 April 2008, and remanded the same day.

On 16 December 2008, at the end of a nine-week trial in the Crown Court at Liverpool, Sean Mercer (a member of the Croxteth Crew gang) was found guilty of murder. Mercer, by then aged 18, was sentenced to life imprisonment, being ordered to serve a minimum term of 22 years, which is set to keep him in prison until at least 2030 and the age of 40. Other gang members James Yates, Nathan Quinn, Boy "M" (who could not be named as he was still under 18), Gary Kays, and Melvin Coy were convicted of assisting an offender. Another defendant aged under 18, Boy "K", later revealed as Dean Kelly, was convicted of four related offences. Kays and Coy were both sentenced to seven years.

Sentencing for four of the defendants was delayed until the following month. In January 2009, Yates was sentenced to seven years, Dean Kelly to four years, and Nathan Quinn to two years. A 16-year-old was sentenced to a two-year supervision order. Parents of the gang members, including Mercer's mother and the parents of Yates, were later tried and convicted for perverting the course of justice. On 28 October 2009, Yates had his sentence increased to 12 years imprisonment, following a referral to the Court of Appeal by the Solicitor General Vera Baird QC as being "too lenient".

On 2 November 2009, Mercer stabbed Jake Fahri (Jimmy Mizen's murderer) in prison, apparently having crafted a knife from a pair of tweezers. Fahri survived and was transferred to another prison.

Following his release from prison, Kelly died on 6 April 2023 from combined drug intoxication at the age of 31.

== Gangs ==
Residents in the Croxteth area have said that there were many problems which parents were warned about by local police anti-social behaviour; in reaction to this, Merseyside Police made the area around the pub into a "designated area", meaning that officers could disperse groups and move people away from the area.

Mercer and the others convicted of involvement in the murder were known to be members of the Croxteth Crew, a criminal gang in Croxteth. The murder came the day before the first anniversary of the killing of Liam Smith, an alleged member of a rival gang, the Norris Green Strand Crew, who was shot dead by members of the Croxteth Crew as he walked out of Altcourse Prison on 23 August 2006.

Jones's murder was later revealed to be a result of Mercer's failed attempt to shoot one or more rival gang members from the Strand Crew who had come into Croxteth, instead missing and hitting Jones as he walked home from football practice. The youth gang phenomenon, and youth gangs of Liverpool in particular, drew high media attention after the murder.

== Tributes and public reaction ==
Jones was a dedicated supporter of Everton Football Club, and had a season ticket along with his father and brother. Players of the team laid a floral tribute, football boots, and football shirts at the scene of the crime, and players and fans paid tribute to him in a minute-long applause at the home game against Blackburn Rovers on 25 August.

After a suggestion from Liverpool Echo columnist Tony Barrett, which was supported by many Echo readers, Everton's local rivals Liverpool FC agreed to play the beginning of Z-Cars – the theme that traditionally greets the arrival of the Everton team onto the Goodison Park pitch – prior to playing Liverpool's own theme ahead of their UEFA Champions League game with Toulouse FC on 28 August. This was followed by a period of applause; the Liverpool players and staff, Toulouse players, and match day officials wore black armbands during the game.

Jones was buried in a private ceremony on 6 September 2007, following a funeral service at Liverpool Cathedral, which was attended by more than 2,500 people. His family issued a public invitation for well-wishers to attend the service, where mourners were requested to wear bright clothes or football strips. During the service, Steve Jones read a poem he had written for his son, and Everton footballer Alan Stubbs read from the Bible.

The Rhys Jones Memorial Fund raised money to fund a new community centre close to where Jones died. The Rhys Jones Community Centre on Langley Close, Croxteth Park opened on 31 August 2013.

Starting on 24 April 2017, a four-part ITV drama Little Boy Blue aired based on the murder. It was met with positive reviews where viewers described how hard it was to watch. However, the drama was criticised by a senior police officer who described her portrayal in it as "simply wrong". She said the ITV programme, although based on a real event, is a drama and therefore details had been dramatised and should not be taken as fact. Boy "X", a member of Mercer's gang who ultimately testified via video link against the gang, was given the name "Kevin" in the drama, though Boy "X"'s real name was never made public.
