= List of Luther episodes =

Luther is a British psychological crime drama television series that premiered on BBC One in the UK on 4 May 2010. The series centres on DCI John Luther (played by Idris Elba), a highly talented detective working in London to solve a series of high-profile murders. Co-stars include Ruth Wilson as Alice Morgan, Warren Brown as DS Justin Ripley, Steven Mackintosh as DCI Ian Reed, and Saskia Reeves as Det Supt Rose Teller. As the series progresses Nikki Amuka-Bird joins as the recently promoted DCI Erin Gray, and Dermot Crowley is promoted to a starring role as Det Supt Martin Schenk, and Michael Smiley continues portraying Benny Silver. Patrick Malahide appears as George Cornelius in the fourth and fifth series.

As of 4 January 2019, 20 episodes of Luther have aired, concluding the fifth series. A sequel film, Luther: The Fallen Sun, aired on 24 February 2023. All episodes and the film were written by series creator Neil Cross.

== Series overview ==
Series	Episodes	Originally released		Avg. UK viewers (millions)
Series	Episodes	First released	Last released	Avg. UK viewers (millions)
1	6	4 May 2010	8 June 2010	4.83
2	4	14 June 2011	5 July 2011	6.43
3	4	2 July 2013	23 July 2013	5.98
4	2	15 December 2015	22 December 2015	7.92
5	4	1 January 2019	4 January 2019	9.45
Film		24 February 2023		–

== Episodes ==
=== Series 1 (2010) ===
The first series tells a single crime story each episode for the first four episodes, and then ends with a two-part story, with other narrative elements developing across the series.

No. overall	Episode	Directed by	Written by	Original release date	UK viewers (millions)
1	Episode 1	Brian Kirk	Neil Cross	4 May 2010	6.35
DCI John Luther (Idris Elba) returns to active duty several months after suffering a nervous breakdown related to the capture of a serial kidnapper/murderer named Henry Madsen (Anton Saunders), whom he had allowed to fall from a great height and is now in a coma. On his first day back, Luther solves a double homicide by unravelling the bizarre behaviour of the murdered couple's daughter, Alice Morgan (Ruth Wilson). Despite pursuing her relentlessly, he is unable to prove her guilt. Luther also pursues his estranged wife Zoe (Indira Varma), whom he still loves, and ends up in a violent altercation with her new boyfriend, Mark (Paul McGann).
2	Episode 2	Brian Kirk	Neil Cross	11 May 2010	5.80
A sniper begins targeting police officers all over London, and Luther must track him down. The sniper, traumatised by his experiences in war, is being driven to his brutal crimes by his father, who – despite being in prison – has complete control over his son's actions. Luther stages a television interview, insulting the sniper and drawing him out at great personal risk. Meanwhile, Alice continues to stalk Luther, becoming increasingly obsessive and threatening.
3	Episode 3	Sam Miller	Neil Cross	18 May 2010	4.56
Luther pursues a serial killer and occult writer named Lucien Burgess (Paul Rhys), who kidnaps a mother every decade and drains them of their blood. Things become complicated when Burgess accuses Luther of having attacked him, making it difficult for Luther to continue the case through legal means. Luther continues to communicate with Alice, and forms an unusual friendship with her; she proceeds to hire a group of girls to beat up Mark in an attempt to emasculate him and drive Zoe back to Luther. Meanwhile, Henry Madsen awakens from his coma; though he is not yet able to testify, when he does so he will be able to destroy Luther's career.
4	Episode 4	Sam Miller	Neil Cross	25 May 2010	4.57
A serial killer continues targeting women who are alone at night. He takes a piece of jewellery from each of them, and gives one of their necklaces to his unknowing wife, as a birthday gift. He escalates rapidly, and Luther's team is forced to enlist the help of the killer's wife, in order to track him down. He is successfully taken alive, but his wife assaults him in a fit of rage, striking him with a hammer in the back of the head. In an attempt to win Luther's friendship, Alice impersonates a doctor and lights a fire in the hospital, taking advantage of the distraction to fatally smother Henry Madsen.
5	Episode 5	Stefan Schwartz	Neil Cross	1 June 2010	3.61
An art dealer's wife is taken hostage, and the kidnappers demand a set of valuable diamonds in exchange for her life. The husband goes to the police for help, because his wife has swallowed the diamonds, and he fears that if this is revealed, the kidnappers will kill her to get them. Events spin rapidly out of control when it is revealed that Luther's colleague DCI Ian Reed (Steven Mackintosh) had knowledge of the robbery and allowed it to go ahead in exchange for a portion of the profits. Reed kills his criminal contact to cover his trail and then the kidnapper himself. He flees, finally killing Zoe in an attempt to draw Luther out, and frames Luther for the crime.
6	Episode 6	Stefan Schwartz	Neil Cross	8 June 2010	4.11
Luther, framed for Zoe's murder, chooses to run from the police until he can prove his innocence. His boss, Det Supt Rose Teller (Saskia Reeves), has strong regrets for having taken Luther back from suspension, despite having received advice not to. Luther is almost shot by a Special Branch sniper at a meeting with Ian Reed. Teller believes in Reed, but her colleague, Det Supt Martin Schenk, initially does not. However, thanks to Schenk's interview with Mark, he soon realises that Reed may be the culprit rather than Luther. Luther plots to take revenge on Reed with the assistance of Alice and Mark. Luther disagrees with the means by which Alice and Mark vote to handle Reed.

=== Series 2 (2011) ===
The second series consists of two two-part stories, with a third story running across all four episodes.

No. overall	Episode	Directed by	Written by	Original release date	UK viewers (millions)
7	Episode 1	Sam Miller	Neil Cross	14 June 2011	6.48
Luther, still plagued by Zoe's death, faces a serial killer wearing a Punch mask who wishes to emulate London folklore figure Spring-heeled Jack, and Luther tries to rescue Jenny Jones, the daughter of an old acquaintance, from the dangerous world of drugs, pornography, and prostitution.
8	Episode 2	Sam Miller	Neil Cross	21 June 2011	6.11
Luther must rescue Ripley before Cameron sets out his final murdering scheme: kidnapping, gassing, and disposing of the bodies of schoolchildren. Meanwhile, Jenny's ruthless and vengeful boss is demanding compensation for Luther's having stolen her "property".
9	Episode 3	Sam Miller	Neil Cross	28 June 2011	6.36
What appears to be a deranged killer soon begins killing at random, but there is a larger twist than Luther thinks. Meanwhile, Jenny's tormentor Toby demands that Luther help him gain information about a rival's operation; when Luther can't deliver on time, Toby threatens Jenny's life. Detective Gray discovers Luther is hiding something and asks Ripley to help her.
10	Episode 4	Sam Miller	Neil Cross	5 July 2011	6.77
The random killings are being carried out by twins, one of whom Luther has arrested, but the other is still on the loose. It is up to Luther to capture or kill the twin who is at-large. Meanwhile, Luther must try to keep Jenny's ex-boss from discovering Toby's death and his own colleagues from discovering his activities.

=== Series 3 (2013) ===
Series 3 follows the structure of series 2, consisting of two two-part stories, with a third story running across all four episodes.

No. overall	Episode	Directed by	Written by	Original release date	UK viewers (millions)
11	Episode 1	Sam Miller	Neil Cross	2 July 2013	6.43
Luther hunts for a killer who lurks in his victims' houses before killing them and then steals their shoes. The killer is escalating, so Luther must try to find him before he strikes again. At the same time, Luther is distracted by an ongoing case concerning the murder of a cyber troll. Luther meets and befriends a woman named Mary while driving, starting a good rapport with each other. Erin Gray, who has recently been transferred to anti-corruption, takes Ripley to DSU George Stark, who is preciding over a case into Luther’s corruption history. Stark and Gray fits Ripley with a wire and have him inspect Luther for any corrupt or criminal activity, threatening both Ripley and Luther’s careers if he chooses not to comply. Luther interrogates a lead but doing so, holds him over a ledge to get him to talk, nearly getting caught by a listening Gray and Stark. Luther and Ripley are sent to speak with the father and mother of the cybertroll and interrogate them on information. Luther finds fingerprint evidence that could imply the father’s guilt. Luther calls the father over to ask for a follow up interrogation but the father chooses to put his hand into a blender instead to prevent his hand being identified. Eventually, Luther is able to track the pattern of deaths for the first case and attempts to call the next potential victim but Ripley, fresh from being informed of the father putting his hand in the blender, angrily confronts and attacks Luther for seemingly tipping the father off. Schenk orders both of them to get it together and to leave for the night. Ripley meets with Gray to organise a testimony against Luther. Luther is unable to pass on the message to the next victim. The killer breaks into the victim’s house, sneaks into the attic and kills her husband when he goes to investigate. The victim hides in a cupboard but is quickly found by the killer.
12	Episode 2	Sam Miller	Neil Cross	9 July 2013	5.95
As the killer strikes again, the team works hard to try and track him down, which hunt leads them to a top criminal now residing in a retirement home. The team must stop the killer before he attacks a group of young female nurses having a night in. Luther and Ripley also hunt for the murderer of the cyber troll, but their sympathies threaten to cloud their professional judgement. Meanwhile, Luther realizes that a case is being built against him, by one of his very own, but Ripley might also be willing to help bring Luther down. Ripley gives testimony towards Luther’s guilt to anti-corruption, while Luther breaks into their safehouse, takes down the incriminating evidence and steals the testimony, in front of Ripley, Stark and Gray. Stark is left bitter and angry from the encounter. Listening to the recording after the fact, Luther quickly realizes that Ripley’s testimony actually exonerates his guilty. He meets with Mary and both of them decide to start a relationship.
13	Episode 3	Farren Blackburn	Neil Cross	16 July 2013	5.57
Luther is assigned to hunt a vigilante killer, Tom Marwood, who murders those he deems to have lost their right to life. The case probes the interests of the media, and soon the team has a political and criminal nightmare on their hands. Anti-corruption interrogates Mary, with Gray informing her of the death of Luther’s ex wife Zoe as well as other crimes which can be connected to him. Mary, left traumatized by the experience, confronts Luther. While he is able to explain the circumstances, Mary chooses to take a break in their relationship. Luther confronts Stark later about the encounter and threatens him not to go near her again. When Marwood kidnaps Terence Corran, a convicted child sex offender, with the intent of having the public vote to have him lynched, driving up his public support, the team locate him due to the public nature of the lynching. Luther stays to save Corran while Ripley chases Marwood, who when cornered shoots and kills him. Luther finds Ripley’s body and cries into him, as Marwood breaking into Luther’s house and aggressively goes after a scared Mary.
14	Episode 4	Farren Blackburn	Neil Cross	23 July 2013	5.96
Luther is framed for the murder of Ripley and attempted murder of Mary. While being moved to a secure location he is broken free by Alice who helps him predict Marwood's next moves. Marwood is traced to an abandoned building where he is planning on executing a convicted drunk driver. He escapes and tracks down Mary, (Luther's love interest) killing Stark and wounding Gray, protecting her but Alice and Luther outwit him and he is apprehended alive against his intent to die as a martyr. Alice escapes police custody again and Luther is exonerated from the accusation of Ripley's death.

=== Series 4 (2015) ===
Series 4 consists of one two-part story.

No. overall	Episode	Directed by	Written by	Original release date	UK viewers (millions)
15	Episode 1	Sam Miller	Neil Cross	15 December 2015	8.19
On a leave of absence from the police force, Luther is lying low in a rundown cottage on the English coast, mourning Ripley’s death. One day, he is visited by DCI Theo Bloom and DS Emma Lane at the Met, who reveal that Alice has seemingly been found dead, drowned after a botched diamond deal with criminals. Luther, unable to accept this, travels to London and uses criminal informant Errol to discover more information in regards to the botched deal. Errol reveals that mob boss George Cornelius orchestrated the deal. Luther takes Cornelius captive from his home in broad daylight and shackles him to a radiator to get him to say what happened. Cornelius reveals that he orchestrates the deal but had no idea who Alice was or her intentions with the diamonds. Meanwhile, a gruesome serial killer has struck the city. With a trail of clues leading from one crime scene to the next, Schenk, Bloom and Lane work to investigate the case. Bloom consults Luther on the case and determine that the criminal must be doing something with the missing body parts. Unfortunately, investigating a mysterious cupboard, Bloom accidentally triggers a bomb mechanism, killing him instantly. Luther, shocked by the event, abandons Cornelius and returns to the bullpen in order to finish the case. Working with a grieving Lane, Luther determines the whereabouts of the killer and him and Benny investigates his home. The killer is able to escape before Luther can capture him.
16	Episode 2	Sam Miller	Neil Cross	22 December 2015	7.64
On the trail of a cannibalistic killer suffering from Cotard syndrome, Luther is dogged at every step by ghosts from his past. Isolated and on edge, it takes every fibre of his being to keep it together. Could a cold case help to unlock a mystery that's tormenting him? Meanwhile, the serial killer is still on the loose. Benny's hacking skills have revealed a list of hundreds of potential victims but, with a rapidly escalating number of crime scenes, Luther must use all his ingenuity to work out where the murderer is headed next. Discovering it's all part of a macabre end game, Luther is forced to put himself and his new colleague Emma into the heart of danger to try to stop the killing.

=== Series 5 (2019) ===
Series 5 consists of a single, serialized narrative over four episodes.

No. overall	Episode	Directed by	Written by	Original release date	UK viewers (millions)
17	Episode 1	Jamie Payne	Neil Cross	1 January 2019	10.36
When a series of seemingly indiscriminate killings become ever more audacious, Luther and new recruit DS Catherine Halliday are confounded by a tangle of leads and misdirection that appears designed to protect an untouchable corruption. To make matters more complex, the son of Luther's old adversary George Cornelius has gone missing and he believes the detective has something to do with it.
18	Episode 2	Jamie Payne	Neil Cross	2 January 2019	9.39
Alice reveals the circumstances of her miraculous survival, having managed to escape Cornelius’s men, who attempted to double cross her fighting over the diamonds, faking her death to ensure Cornelius didn’t go after her. From there Alice emerged months later, kidnapped Alistair and attempted to broker an unsuccessful deal with Cornelius for the diamonds. In the present, Luther attempts to hide Alice from Schenk and Halliday, who discuss the case and hypothesis that the suicide of the serial killer seemed orchestrated and that there is more to what’s going on behind the scenes. Later in the night, Cornelius and his men attack Luther’s home, leading him and Alice to run away and hide in Alice’s old home as a safehouse. Alice shows a kidnapped Alistair to Luther, and the two spend time reflecting together before returning Alistair to Cornelius. Unsatisfied with the weakness that his son has shown impending on his legacy, Cornelius kidnaps and brutally tortures Benny and orders Luther to give up Alice, or else he faces more harm. Luther and Halliday investigate an increasingly erratic Jeremy Lake as the actual killer, speaking directly with him on the previous case and noticing a mysterious brain scan he is looking at. With Luther faced with giving Alice to Cornelius, Alice takes the choice out of his hand, impersonates a prostitute, infiltrate the party for Alistair’s return, sneaks into his room while he is sleeping and kills him with a sharp knife into his ear before leaving the scene in secret. In private, Lake is cleaned and treated roughly by Vivienne as they both grow increasingly concerned over his condition and what little time they have left for each other.
19	Episode 3	Jamie Payne	Neil Cross	3 January 2019	9.18
As Luther works to rescue Benny from Cornelius' clutches, he is forced to quickly evacuate Alice after she kills Alistair. Cornelius, left even more angered by the death of his son, hires an enforcer to hunt after Luther. Luther is able to save Benny from Cornelius’ clutches and hides both him and Alice with Mark North, who is now happily remarried and having fixed his life around. The enforcer finds where Errol is and uses him to track Benny’s, and for that matter Luther and Alice’s, location, before killing him. Under orders by Luther, Halliday infiltrates Jeremy Lake’s office and finds a scan of a brain, making startling realisation about Jeremy Lake. Halliday comes to the hypothesis that Jeremy Lake is dying from a brain tumor, with the tension of the tumor leading towards his psychotic behavior and killings. Luther and Halliday raid Lake’s home and find Viviene Lake attempting to kill a target. Halliday and Luther are able to apprehend Vivienne and engage to search for Jeremy but Luther receives a phonecall from an enforcer of George Cornelius who tells him to turn himself over to be killed. Benny chooses to stand up for Luther, Alice and Mark and confronts the enforcer but is quickly killed as Luther is left emotionally overwhelmed by the event and unsure of what to do. Alice is left even more shocked and traumatized by the event.
20	Episode 4	Jamie Payne	Neil Cross	4 January 2019	8.87
After the death of Benny, Luther confronts George Cornelius and organises a deal with him to find where Mark and Alice are being held and where his enforcer is. While together they upstage the enforcer, he is quickly killed by Cornelius, who takes a photo to make it look like Luther killed the man before leaving. Luther is able to save Mark and Alice, working with them to hide their involvement in both deaths, much to Mark’s shock and Alice’s disinterest. Schenk is informed of Benny’s death and finds evidence pointing towards Cornelius. Alice, disillusioned with Luther, tells Mark to never come near Luther again for his own safety and goes after Cornelius directly, staging at his house and preparing to kill him. The attempted assassination is stopped just as the police arrive to apprehend Cornelius for the death of Benny. Cornelius, confronted by Schenk, shows photo evidence of Luther’s involvement in the enforcer’s death, with Schenk being given no choice but to apprehend him. As this is happening, Jeremy Lake ups his body count by kidnapping and killing more and more innocent people and making residence at a residential house. Luther is interrogating Viviene Lake to give up Jeremy’s location, eventually convincing her based on the little time Jeremy has left before his death. Halliday is called by Schenk about Luther’s possible involvement in the enforcer’s death, which Luther is keenly aware of but moves ahead against Lake regardless. Luther and Halliday find the house and are confronted by ghastly corpses of those killed by Lake. Luther is able to confront Lake as he is attacking Halliday, and brutally beats him with aggressive force. While Lake is apprehended, Halliday is left apprehensive, believing Luther set her up as a trap against him. Before the conversation can continue, Alice arrives and fatally shoots Halliday in the head and shoots Luther in the side. Alice mocks and belittles Luther based on his carelessness towards the death in his life, believing him to be a villain who uses people and lets them die for him. Luther and Alice continue their fight into a construction building, while the police chase after Luther, with the two bartering back and forth, unable to kill the other based on their shared experience. Alice is finally knocked off a landing, and while Luther tries to save her, she chooses to fall, seemingly to her death on a platform below. The police catch up to Luther and arrest him on murder charges, with Schenk mournfully cuffing him, with the series ending with an emotionally and physically broken Luther being marched away to a prison van.

=== Film (2023) ===
A feature film sequel, Luther: The Fallen Sun, was released in select cinemas on 24 February 2023, before its streaming release on 10 March 2023, by Netflix.

Title	Directed by	Written by	Original release date
Luther: The Fallen Sun	Jamie Payne	Neil Cross	24 February 2023
A serial killer terrorizes London while disgraced detective John Luther sits behind bars. Haunted by his failure to capture the cyber psychopath who now taunts him, Luther decides to break out of prison to finish the job by any means necessary.

== Ratings ==
Luther : UK viewers per episode (millions)

Series	Episode number					
Series	1	2	3	4	5	6
1	6.35	5.80	4.56	4.57	3.61	4.11
2	6.48	6.11	6.36	6.77	–	
3	6.43	5.95	5.57	5.96	–	
4	8.19	7.64	–			
5	10.36	9.39	9.18	8.87	–	

Audience measurement performed by Broadcasters' Audience Research BoardBARB

== Special ==
No.	Title	Written by	Original release date
–	"Meet the Luthers"	Neil Cross	18 March 2016
A Sport Relief spoof that supposedly takes a look at DCI John Luther's life outside of the force.
