= Luther: The Calling =

Novel by Neil Cross

- Cover
- Author: Neil Cross
- Language: English
- Genre: Mystery fiction
- Publisher: Simon & Schuster
- Publication date: 4 August 2011
- Publication place: United Kingdom
- Pages: 368
- ISBN: 978-0-85720-337-3
- Followed by: Luther (TV series)

Luther: The Calling by Neil Cross is a tie-in novel based on the BBC crime drama Luther. Two further Luther novels were anticipated, but have not appeared.

== Summary ==
The novel introduces the character of Detective Chief Inspector (DCI) John Luther. The novel is a prequel to the television series and focuses on the traumatic case involving a child killer named Henry Madsen. The novel expands on and explains several elements of the TV series, such as the breakup of the Luthers' marriage, and the corruption of DCI Ian Reed. The final events in the book mirror those portrayed at the start of Series 1 of the television series, which aired 15 months prior to the novel's release.

== Reception ==
Sue Turnbull of The Age describes the book as providing "some clever but uncomfortable reading". She concludes by comparing the novel to the television series stating "What this book offers is bleaker, more confronting and, well, terrifying. Be prepared". John O'Connell from The Guardian summarised the novel by stating "the key murders in The Calling are so repulsive and their perpetrator so plausible that at times I had to force myself to keep reading. But I'm glad I did." Rob Farquhar of the Carins Post commended Neil Cross on the creation of DCI John Luther describing Luther as a man "possessed of brilliance and by an animal ferocity that he keeps from all but the monsters he seeks out". He concluded by stating fans of the "TV series will love this".

In 2012, Luther: The Calling won the Ngaio Marsh Award for Best Crime Novel.

== See also ==
- Luther (TV series)
- List of Luther characters
- List of Luther episodes
