= List of Luther characters =

This is a list of fictional characters in the British psychological crime drama television series Luther, its international remakes and film continuation.

== Overview ==
Character	Portrayed by	Series					Film
Character	Portrayed by	1	2	3	4	5	Film
DCI John Luther	Idris Elba	Main	Main	Main	Main	Main	Main
Alice Morgan	Ruth Wilson	Main	Main	Featured		Main	
DCI Ian Reed	Steven Mackintosh	Main					
Zoe Luther	Indira Varma	Main					
Mark North	Paul McGann	Main	Main			Recurring	
DSU Rose Teller	Saskia Reeves	Main					
DS Justin Ripley	Warren Brown	Main	Main	Main	Featured		
DCI/DSU Martin Schenk	Dermot Crowley	Main	Main	Main	Main	Main	Main
DS/DCI Erin Gray	Nikki Amuka-Bird		Main	Main			
Jenny Jones	Aimee-Ffion Edwards		Main				
Baba	Pam Ferris		Main				
Toby Kent	David Dawson		Main				
Mary Day	Sienna Guillory			Main			
DSU George Stark	David O'Hara			Main			
DS Benny Silver	Michael Smiley	Recurring	Recurring	Recurring	Main	Main	
DCI Theo Bloom	Darren Boyd				Featured		
DS Emma Lane	Rose Leslie				Main		
Megan Cantor	Laura Haddock				Main		
George Cornelius	Patrick Malahide				Main	Main	
DS Catherine Halliday	Wunmi Mosaku					Main	
Jeremy Lake	Enzo Cilenti					Main	
Vivien Lake	Hermione Norris					Main	
Palmer (hitman)	Anthony Howell					Featured	
DCI Odette Raine	Cynthia Erivo						Main
David Robey	Andy Serkis						Main

== Main characters ==
=== John Luther ===
John Luther
- Luther character
- First appearance: Series 1, Episode 1
- Created by: Neil Cross
- Portrayed by: Idris Elba

In-universe information
- Nickname: Luther
- Gender: Male
- Title: Detective Chief Inspector
- Occupation: Police officer
- Spouse: Zoe Luther
- Significant others: Mary Day; Alice Morgan
- Nationality: British

Detective Chief Inspector John Luther, portrayed by Idris Elba, works for the Metropolitan Police Service, in the Serious Crime Unit. He is a legendary figure on the force both for his dedication and his ingenious approaches to solving cases. However, the horrors of Luther's job have given rise to emotional demons which often put him at odds with colleagues and loved ones. Because of this, he constantly breaches protocol and uses unorthodox (and sometimes illegal) methods, such as breaking into properties without warrants to find clues or violently threatening suspects or witnesses. He is also given to belligerent fits of anger. Nevertheless, he is known to hate firearms, and he refuses to kill or directly cause the death of suspects.

Luther studied English at University, where he met future spouse Zoe.

Luther returns from leave to investigate the double murder of Alice Morgan's parents, and quickly realises that she committed the crime. However, Morgan's methodical destruction of evidence keeps Luther from conclusively proving her guilt. A peculiar relationship develops between Luther and Morgan, and Luther approaches her for help on occasion. Morgan insinuates herself into Luther's relationship with Zoe with the intention of helping their marriage, yet her means only further complicate Luther's personal problems.

When Zoe is shot and killed by Luther's best friend, the corrupt Detective Chief Inspector Ian Reed, Luther – known for his violent temper – is blamed for the murder because Reed sets up the crime scene to implicate him. Luther subsequently becomes the focus of a citywide manhunt. Events transpire during which Alice kills Reed during a confrontation between him, on one side, and her, Luther, and Zoe's boyfriend Mark on the other, at a deserted Waterloo station. After providing proof that Reed murdered Zoe, Luther is allowed to return to the service, where he has now been assigned to the reorganised Serious and Serial Crime Unit, headed by DSU Schenck.

At the start of the second series, Luther has moved into an unmaintained flat at the Aylesbury Estate and shows suicidal tendencies. Luther also desires to leave the Met. He is approached by Caroline Jones, the wife of one of his former suspects, who asks him to locate her delinquent daughter, Jenny. When Luther tracks down Jenny and rescues her from a pornography shoot, the production's backers, Toby Kent and his grandmother, "Baba", violently pressure the inspector to hand her back. Rather than doing so, Luther strikes an illegal deal to provide them with information, in exchange for setting Jenny free. When Jenny kills Toby in self-defence, Luther manages to cover up her crime and threatens Baba with a visit from Alice if she continues to harass Jenny and her mother.

In Series 3, Luther is secretly being investigated by anti-corruption for his involvement in previous criminal activities. Ripley is persuaded to wear a wire and give testimony against Luther behind his back but instead chooses to exonerate him. As this is going on, Luther begins to fall in love and date a woman named Mary. Conflict escalates when Luther deals with the increasing pressure of anti-corruption nearly ruining his relationship and the threat of vigilante killer Tom Marwood. Seeing potential to reason with him, Luther chooses to give a deadline to try and prove Marwood’s beliefs of criminals needing to die wrong. This ends up backfiring and in the resulting aftermath, Marwood ends up killing Ripley and attacking Mary, pinning Luther as an accomplice to both. Working alongside a returning Alice, Luther is able to defeat Marwood and despite losing the love of Mary and plagued by the death of Ripley, decides to pursue a relationship with Alice.

In Series 4, Luther takes a leave of absence out of London, still mourning Ripley, when he is brought back by the news of the death of Alice, seemingly being killed in a botched criminal diamond deal in Europe. Luther tracks down and captures crime lord George Cornelius, who was responsible for the plot and ties him to a radiator. After interrogating him, Luther is forced to assist with a criminal investigation when the presiding detective is killed in an explosion, while Cornelius escapes and plans a scheme against Luther. Luther tracks down the killer and later gives the stolen diamonds to Cornelius to settle their score with each other, as he is left emotionally cold from the death of Alice.

In Series 5, as Luther deals with one overarching disturbing case alongside new partner Catherine Haliday, he is forced to deal with a returning Cornelius who wants to locate his kidnapped son. Luther is surprised to find a somehow alive Alice concocted the scheme and deals with increasing consequences as Cornelius hunts them down, torturing and later having an enforcer kill Benny and later framing him for the murder of said enforcer. Alice, increasingly upset with Luther, turns against him, killing Haliday and engaging in a fight across a railing which leads to Alice seemingly falling to her death.

In Luther Fallen Sun, Luther is arrested for his involvement in the previous deaths. With him previously investigating the circumstances of murders enacted by psychopath millionaire David Robey, Luther’s previous corruption is brought up to the public and with the other supporting evidence, he is found guilty and imprisoned for multiple years in jail. Urged to return to the case, Luther breaks out of jail and proceeds where he left off on the case without any police support, actively hunted down by them. Eventually, Luther defeats Robey and in lieu of being sent for jail, a MI5 operative meets with him, seemingly with a job.

Idris Elba said of his character, "You know when you watch the news and someone has killed their children? And your instinct is to be like, 'Oh, if I got my hands on them'? Well, his instinct is to do that but he's a police officer. And when he does get his hands on them, he doesn't necessarily follow procedure. He will be as vindictive as the criminal".

=== Alice Morgan ===
Alice Morgan
- Luther character
- First appearance: Series 1, Episode 1
- Created by: Neil Cross
- Portrayed by: Ruth Wilson

In-universe information
- Gender: Female
- Occupation: Criminal fugitive research scientist
- Significant other: John Luther

Alice Morgan, played by Ruth Wilson, is a research scientist with a genius-level IQ. When first introduced, Alice has murdered her parents – and their dog – in such a calculated fashion, that not even Luther is able to prove her guilt, of which he is absolutely certain. Alice's core belief, that nothing in life ultimately matters, comes into direct conflict with Luther's own beliefs. She frequently insinuates herself into Luther's professional and personal life, both as an enemy and ally, with behaviours ranging from stalking him and those close to him, to helping him avoid criminal prosecution. She also provides Luther with a unique insight into the criminal mind. Luther describes Alice as a malignant narcissist.

At the beginning of Series 2, Alice is in a mental institute following the events of Series 1 (she had confessed to killing Ian Reed). Luther goes to visit her, whereupon it is revealed she tried to kill herself by cutting her wrist. While visiting, Luther offers Alice an apple. She declines it, but after he leaves, he throws his half-eaten apple over the wall of the mental institute's gardens in which Alice is walking. When she picks the apple up, it is revealed that Luther has stolen a swipe card and given it to Alice to help her escape.

After escaping, she visits him one last time, asking Luther to come away with her to travel overseas. However, he refuses, as he cannot shake his dedication to being a police officer, and – he says: "I am who I am, and you are who you are". Alice then leaves him behind. She returns in the Series 3 season finale, when Luther is wrongly accused of arranging for DS Ripley's murder by a killer vigilante. After freeing him from police custody, Alice aids Luther in proving his innocence, and in the vigilante's capture. Having made her interest in developing a relationship with Luther clear, after again evading arrest, she meets up with Luther, and the episode ends as they debate what to do next.

Alice's apparent death in Belgium is announced in the first few minutes of Series 4. It is revealed that she and Luther have secretly been in regular communication by burner phone, and had been planning to flee to São Paulo. Her apparent death, and Luther's investigation of it, is a key component of the two-episode series.

Morgan is eventually revealed to be alive in Series 5, having faked her death when she realized Luther was never truly going to run away with her. Luther attempts to protect her and himself from Alice's robbery of crime boss George Cornelius, but eventually their relationship reaches its inevitable destruction when Morgan murders DS Catherine Halliday. Ultimately culminating in a struggle with Luther and Morgan falling to her apparent death and Luther's arrest for the deaths of Morgan, Halliday, and Benny Silver. Series creator Neil Cross later confirmed that Alice survived the fall. She is set to return in an unspecified capacity in Luther 3.

=== Justin Ripley ===
Justin Ripley
- Luther character
- First appearance: Series 1, Episode 1
- Last appearance: Series 4, Episode 1
- Created by: Neil Cross
- Portrayed by: Warren Brown

In-universe information
- Gender: Male
- Title: Detective Sergeant
- Occupation: Police officer

Detective Sergeant Justin Ripley, played by Warren Brown, is a young policeman eager to be partnered with a detective like Luther, but he doesn't quite realise what doing so will entail.

After Luther is framed for Zoe's murder and flees, Ripley is the only one who believes that he is innocent and aids Luther in destroying the main piece of evidence against him. Ripley is arrested at the end of Series 1, after saving a fugitive Luther's life from a police marksman. For this action, he is put back in uniform and told he will remain in uniform for two years (though he keeps his rank of sergeant). At the beginning of Series 2, Luther has Ripley reinstated as a detective and puts him back on his team. DS Gray remarks that DS Ripley was a rising star but has now tarnished his career. At the end of Series 2 episode 1, Ripley is kidnapped by Cameron Pell, who tortures him throughout the next episode before Ripley manages to escape and aid in Pell's arrest.

In Series 3, Ripley is questioned by DSU George Stark and DCI Erin Gray, who are attempting to bring down Luther. At first, Ripley seems to be helping them, but he later tells them he has been honoured to work with Luther. In episode 3, Ripley chases the vigilante killer Tom Marwood into an alleyway and corners him. Despite Marwood's insistence, Ripley refuses to back down, so Marwood fatally shoots him. His death is avenged when Marwood is captured by Luther in episode 4.

Post death, Ripley is briefly seen talking to Luther in a flashback at the start of Season 4.

=== Martin Schenk ===
Martin Schenk
- Luther character
- First appearance: Series 1, Episode 3
- Created by: Neil Cross
- Portrayed by: Dermot Crowley

In-universe information
- Gender: Male
- Title(s): Detective Superintendent; Detective Chief Inspector
- Occupation: Police officer

Detective Superintendent Martin Schenk, played by Dermot Crowley, initially works for Police Complaints and is universally feared for his steel-trap mind. A highly intuitive and observant individual, who appears unassuming, Schenk is determined to rid the force of corrupt officers which, despite Schenk's high regard for Luther's abilities, may include Luther himself.

In The Calling, he investigated Luther for the first time after Luther set Julian Crouch's Jaguar on fire. He tells Zoe that he is married, and that he used to be a murder detective until he was stabbed.

Schenk appeared in episodes 3 to 6 in Series 1 and returned in Series 2 to head up the new Serious and Serial Crime Unit, replacing Rose Teller as DCI Luther's boss.

As the series goes along and despite how he is originally depicted as a rival, Schenk develops a trusted friendship with Luther and the rest of the Serious and Serial Unit, doing whatever he can to assist even when he disagrees with them breaking the rules and are on the run from the law. This unfortunately comes with tragedy with the deaths of Ripley, Benny and Halliday and later the incarceration of Luther in the series finale.

Between Series 5 and Fallen Sun, Schenk is depicted as having retired from his position at Serious and Serial Crime Unit after Luther’s arrest for multiple past crimes. He is reinstated by the new SSCU head Odette Rain as a consultant to oversee the hunt for an escaped Luther, assisting him where possible and rescuing him from a frozen lake.

=== Benny 'Deadhead' Silver ===
Benny Silver
- Luther character
- First appearance: Series 1, Episode 3
- Last appearance: Series 5, Episode 4
- Created by: Neil Cross
- Portrayed by: Michael Smiley

In-universe information
- Nickname: Deadhead
- Gender: Male
- Title: Detective Sergeant
- Occupation: Police officer tech support

DS Benny "Deadhead" Silver, played by Michael Smiley, was first introduced in Series 1, when Luther needed some technological expertise. In Series 2, he has become a full-time employee of the new Serious and Serial Crime Unit. He gets his nickname Benny Deadhead from his laid back nature. In his first appearance, as well as the final two episodes of Series 2, he is shown to have an interest in role-playing games as well as World of Warcraft. This knowledge comes in handy in Series 2, when the SSU is trying to catch twin killers for whom murder is part of a game.

In Series 5, he becomes a more pivotal part of the cast in the criminal sideplot, using his tech skills to help Luther and a returning Alice Morgan against the threat of crime boss George Cornelius, who wants them both dead for the capture and later murder of his son. For his part, Cornelius finds and electrically tortures Benny for multiple days for his involvement before Luther finds and rescues him. Laying low at Mark North’s apartment to hide, Benny unknowingly tips Cornelius off to their location where he sends an enforcer against them. In one last act, Benny takes a stand against the enforcer but is murdered for his troubles, much to Luther’s horror. His death is avenged through the killing of the enforcer by Cornelius himself and later Cornelius’s own arrest by Schenk.

=== Erin Gray ===
Erin Gray
- Luther character
- First appearance: Series 2, Episode 1
- Last appearance: Series 3, Episode 4
- Created by: Neil Cross
- Portrayed by: Nikki Amuka-Bird

In-universe information
- Gender: Female
- Title(s): Detective Chief Inspector; Detective Sergeant
- Occupation: Police officer

DCI Erin Gray, played by Nikki Amuka-Bird, is a new member of the team in Series 2 as DS Grey. She is highly intelligent, capable and ambitious, She makes it clear in episode 1 she doesn't want her name tarnished like Ripley's, and she keeps her distance from Luther. Luther keeps her on because she is good at her job and eager to please. During a fire evacuation (a false alarm by Luther) she witnesses him leaving Shenk's office, she attempts to find evidence of wrongdoing by having Shenks account audited, but Ripley eliminates the evidence to protect Luther.

Without evidence, she is accused of attempting to smear Luther and is humiliated when she confronts him. She leaves the Serious and Serial Unit under a cloud. Between Series 2 and 3 she joins anti corruption and is inexplicably promoted to Detective Chief Inspector; apparently missing the rank of Inspector completely. Working with Detective Superintendent George Stark in an investigation against Luther, Grey convinces Ripley to wear a wire to prove Luther is clean. She starts a fake relationship with Ripley to throw Luther off the scent. Grey is last seen being taken to hospital following an attack from the vigilante killer Tom Marwood.

=== Ian Reed ===
Ian Reed
- Luther character
- First appearance: Series 1, Episode 1
- Last appearance: Series 1, Episode 6
- Created by: Neil Cross
- Portrayed by: Steven Mackintosh

In-universe information
- Gender: Male
- Title: Detective Chief Inspector
- Occupation: Police officer

Detective Chief Inspector Ian Reed, played by Steven Mackintosh, is Luther's peer and closest friend. Prior to the events of Series 1, he had been married four times.

A long time associate of Luther, Reed is initially presented as the foil to Luther's liberal interpretations of the law. The pair socialise together and Reed visits Luther regularly to play chess whilst the former is on gardening leave. Upon Luther's return, he regularly collaborates on investigations with both Reed and DS Justin Ripley. When Luther's ex-wife Zoe leaves him, it is Reed who comes to his side.

Secretly, Reed lives a double life in which he takes bribes via money launderer Bill Winingham to look the other way on certain pre-arranged crimes. This arrangement brings him to the attention of American kidnapper Daniel Sugarmann, who kidnaps James and Jessica Carrodus for a ransom of precious jewels. When the crime is discovered and begins to go south, Reed covertly attempts to orchestrate the get away of the gang in order to insulate himself. Instead, he ends up strangling Bill, shooting Sugarmann in front of Luther, and killing Zoe whilst attempting to entrap John.

Luther, Mark, and Alice pursue Ian, who goads Mark in a successful attempt to anger him. As a result, Mark has Alice shoot Ian, killing him.

=== Zoe Luther ===
Zoe Luther
- Luther character
- First appearance: Series 1, Episode 1
- Last appearance: Series 1, Episode 6
- Created by: Neil Cross
- Portrayed by: Indira Varma

In-universe information
- Gender: Female
- Occupation: Legal representative
- Spouse: John Luther
- Significant other: Mark North

Zoe Gillian Luther (née Cornell), played by Indira Varma, is John Luther's estranged wife and a human rights lawyer. During their separation, she has fallen in love with her colleague, Mark North, and finally feels happy with her life. Luther, distraught that she has met someone else, gives into violent rages. Through various events, including a one-time post-breakup sexual encounter with Luther, Zoe is sorely tempted to return to her marriage, but she realises things would only go back to the way they were and she ultimately leaves him.

Zoe is killed by Ian Reed in the penultimate episode of Series 1. While being held at gunpoint, she tries to defend herself with a kitchen knife, simultaneously talking to Luther on the telephone, who hears the murder take place.

=== Rose Teller ===
Rose Teller
- Luther character
- First appearance: Series 1, Episode 1
- Last appearance: Series 1, Episode 6
- Created by: Neil Cross
- Portrayed by: Saskia Reeves

In-universe information
- Gender: Female
- Title: Detective Superintendent
- Occupation: Police officer

Detective Superintendent Rose Teller, played by Saskia Reeves, is Luther's boss in the Serious Crimes Unit during Series 1. Having stuck her neck out to get Luther reinstated following his mental breakdown, she realises it may be hard to play modern-day police politics whilst supporting Luther's unique style of policing. DSU Teller does not return in Series 2, and Luther's new commander, Martin Schenk notes obliquely that good cops sometimes suffer for the misdeeds of the bad ones, suggesting that Teller may have taken the fall for DCI Reed's corruption. Luther makes a brief direct reference to her methodology in the Series 5 finale during an interrogation.

=== Mark North ===
Mark North
- Luther character
- First appearance: Series 1, Episode 1
- Created by: Neil Cross
- Portrayed by: Paul McGann

In-universe information
- Gender: Male
- Occupation: Lawyer
- Significant other: Zoe Luther

Mark North, played by Paul McGann, is a human rights lawyer and, Zoe says: "the polar opposite of Luther". Mark fell in love with Zoe and believed she would be much happier with him than with her husband, which causes considerable friction with Luther.

Alice Morgan frequently harasses Mark and, on one occasion, has him beaten up by a group of female gang members in an attempt to get Zoe and Luther back together, before Luther insists that she stop. This only fuels Mark's dislike for Luther, and Mark becomes increasingly desperate to extract Zoe from the situation. However, after Zoe's death and learning her killer's true identity, Mark plays a part in Ian Reed's death. By the beginning of Series 2, Luther and Mark have become friendly, and Luther trusts Mark to the extent that he uses his house as a safehouse for Jenny Jones.

In Series 5, Mark returns and has since married another woman and fixed his life around since his last appearance in Series 2. He assists Luther with housing Alice and Benny from George Cornelius. They are later tracked down by an enforcer and despite the fatal efforts of Benny, Alice and Mark are left in a meat freezer to die. After the enforcer is killed by Cornelius, Mark and Alice are rescued and made to cover up the death as Mark becomes increasingly disturbed with Luther’s new coldness. Cleaning up evidence at his apartment, Alice warns Mark to stay away from Luther in order to protect himself, with Mark expressing that she doesn’t need to be this callous. At this moment, his wife returns with Alice making a getaway from the scene.

=== Emma Lane ===
Emma Lane
- Luther character
- First appearance: Series 4, Episode 1
- Created by: Neil Cross
- Portrayed by: Rose Leslie

In-universe information
- Gender: Female
- Title: Detective Sergeant
- Occupation: Police officer
- Nationality: British

Detective Sergeant Emma Lane, played by Rose Leslie the newest recruit to the Serious and Serial Unit, Emma finds herself working side by side with the legendary John Luther, after the death of her former boss DCI Theo Bloom.

Growing up, Emma has always been the posh one – perhaps not a natural fit among the crack troops the Serious and Serial Unit. But there's plenty of grit behind her privileged exterior and she is ready to fight tooth and nail for the line of duty. After killing the killer in self defense, Emma is raked with guilt for her actions. She does not make any appearance in Series 5, implied to have left her position between series with a new partner Catherine Halliday taking her role, being one of the few official partners of Luther’s to survive the show.
