= Hard Sun =

2018 British crime drama TV series

- Genre: Drama; Crime drama; Science fiction
- Created by: Neil Cross
- Written by: Neil Cross
- Starring: Jim Sturgess; Agyness Deyn; Nikki Amuka-Bird; Owain Arthur; Lorraine Burroughs; Richard Coyle; Dermot Crowley; Varada Sethu; Jojo Macari; Adrian Rawlins; Derek Riddell; Ukweli Roach; Joplin Sibtain
- Composer: Neil Davidge
- Countries of origin: United Kingdom; United States
- Original language: English
- No. of series: 1
- No. of episodes: 6

Production
- Executive producers: Neil Cross; Kate Harwood; Elizabeth Kilgarriff
- Producer: Hugh Warren
- Cinematography: Si Bell; David Luther; Christopher Ross
- Running time: 54–56 minutes
- Production company: Euston Films

Original release
- Network: BBC One (UK); Hulu (US)
- Release: 6 January – 10 February 2018

Hard Sun is a British six-part pre-apocalyptic crime drama television series, created and written by Neil Cross, starring Agyness Deyn and Jim Sturgess as the principal characters, DI Elaine Renko and DCI Charlie Hicks. The series is a BBC co-production with the American streaming service Hulu.

The series contains six episodes. It premiered on BBC One on 6 January 2018, with all six episodes subsequently available on the same day via BBC iPlayer. The series premiered on Hulu in the United States on 7 March 2018. The series has also been acquired by the Seven Network in Australia, ZDF in Germany and SVT in Sweden. The series was released on DVD and Blu-ray on 19 February 2018. The show was inspired by the David Bowie song "Five Years".

Writer Neil Cross has since expressed his wish to continue the series beyond its first run, claiming he has sketched out a potential five-year story arc. It was cancelled after one season.

== Premise ==
Hard Sun is a pre-apocalyptic crime drama set in contemporary London. The protagonists are two mismatched police officers, Charlie Hicks and Elaine Renko, who stumble upon proof that a mysterious cosmic event will destroy the earth in five years, a fact the government is trying to keep secret to avoid complete anarchy. The duo is pursued by MI5 operatives who are trying to silence them for good.

== Cast and characters ==
- Jim Sturgess as Detective Chief Inspector Charlie Hicks
- Agyness Deyn as Detective Inspector Elaine Renko
- Nikki Amuka-Bird as Grace Morrigan
- Owain Arthur as Detective Sergeant Keith Greener
- Lorraine Burroughs as Simone Hicks
- Richard Coyle as Thom Blackwood
- Dermot Crowley as Father Dennis Chapman
- Varada Sethu as Detective Sergeant Mishal Ali
- Jojo Macari as Daniel Renko
- Adrian Rawlins as Detective Sergeant George Mooney
- Derek Riddell as Detective Chief Superintendent Roland Bell
- Ukweli Roach as Will Benedetti
- Joplin Sibtain as Detective Sergeant Herbie Sarafian
- Aisling Bea as Mari Butler

== Reception ==
=== Critical reception ===
Reviews for the first season were mixed. On the review aggregation website Rotten Tomatoes, the first season holds a 50% approval rating with an average rating of 6.46 out of 10, based on 30 reviews. The website's critical consensus reads, "Hard Sun's heady mix of narrative and visual flourishes buckle under a surfeit of clichés that ultimately weigh it down and leave the show a muddled mess." Metacritic, which uses a weighted average, assigned the season a score of 46 out of 100 based on 9 critics, indicating "mixed or average reviews".

== Episodes ==
No.	Title	Directed by	Written by	Original release date
1	"The Sun, The Moon, The Truth"	Brian Kirk	Neil Cross	6 January 2018
2	"One Thousand, Eight Hundred Days"	Brian Kirk	Neil Cross	13 January 2018
3	"Luke 21:25"	Nick Rowland	Neil Cross	20 January 2018
4	"Can You Hear Him Now?"	Nick Rowland	Neil Cross	27 January 2018
5	"Not the End of the World"	Richard Senior	Neil Cross	3 February 2018
6	"Sun Day"	Richard Senior	Neil Cross	10 February 2018
