= Luther: The Fallen Sun =

2023 film by Jamie Payne

- Release poster
- Directed by: Jamie Payne
- Written by: Neil Cross
- Based on: Luther by Neil Cross
- Produced by: Peter Chernin; Neil Cross; David Ready; Jenno Topping; Idris Elba
- Starring: Idris Elba; Cynthia Erivo; Dermot Crowley; Andy Serkis
- Cinematography: Larry Smith
- Edited by: Justine Wright
- Music by: Lorne Balfe
- Production companies: BBC Film; Chernin Entertainment
- Distributed by: Netflix
- Release dates: 24 February 2023 (United Kingdom and United States); 10 March 2023 (Netflix)
- Running time: 129 minutes
- Countries: United Kingdom; United States
- Language: English

Luther: The Fallen Sun is a 2023 crime thriller film directed by Jamie Payne and written by Neil Cross. It serves as a film continuation of the television series Luther. The film stars Idris Elba (who also serves as a producer on the film), reprising his role as police detective John Luther, with Cynthia Erivo and Andy Serkis. The film is about the detective's efforts to stop a wealthy serial killer's complex schemes.

Luther: The Fallen Sun was released in select theaters on 24 February 2023, before its streaming release on 10 March 2023, by Netflix. A sequel is in development.

== Plot ==
David Robey, a wealthy trader and serial killer, blackmails and kidnaps cleaner Callum Aldrich. DCI John Luther is assigned to the case and promises Callum's mother, Corinne, he will find her son. Concerned about his involvement, Robey digs up dirt on the various illegal acts Luther has committed as a police officer, resulting in him being fired, prosecuted and imprisoned. (Note: Overlapping with developments depicted in the final 2019 episode of Luther Series 5.)

Years later, Robey coaxes Corrine and the parents of other victims to a house where he burns their children's corpses. Corrine visits Luther in prison, admonishing him for not finding her son's killer. Robey transmits an audio recording of him murdering Callum to Luther in prison via radio. Luther informs DCI Odette Raine, the new head of Serious and Serial Crime, of the broadcast. He liaises with prison guards and former associate McCabe to break him out. Raine brings in retired DSU Martin Schenk as a consultant. Luther traces Robey to Piccadilly Circus, where Raine deploys SCO19. The two confront him there, but some people he has blackmailed cause a distraction by publicly killing themselves. Robey escapes into the London Underground after fighting Luther and murdering an armed police officer.

Robey kidnaps Raine's daughter, Anya. He blackmails Raine to bring him Luther in exchange for Anya’s life. Raine meets with Luther, points a gun at him, and forces him to climb into a car trunk. She has a change of heart and reluctantly agrees to work with him. They visit Robey's ex-wife Georgette and discover he owns property abroad. DS Archie Woodward, Raine's subordinate, is blackmailed by Robey into killing Georgette but is intercepted by Schenk. Archie commits suicide. Luther and Raine travel to Robey's mansion in rural Norway, where they discover he tortures kidnapped victims to death on a live stream called "The Red Bunker". The two are overpowered, and Robey tries to force them to hurt each other to save Anya. Luther reveals Georgette told the police the location and they are en route. After a brutal fight, the three are able to escape the bunker, and Luther chases Robey into a frozen lake, where Robey drowns. Luther is rescued by police divers and Schenk. Recovering from his injuries back in London, he is approached by a senior MI5 official, who, it is implied, offers him a job in lieu of going back to prison.

== Cast ==
- Idris Elba as John Luther, a brilliant but disgraced former Detective Chief Inspector who escapes prison to pursue Robey.
- Cynthia Erivo as Odette Raine, the current head of the Serious and Serial Crime Unit (SSCU), hunting down Luther and Robey.
- Dermot Crowley as Martin Schenk, the retired former head of the SSCU and Luther's former boss.
- Andy Serkis as David Robey, a wealthy and psychopathic millionaire turned high body count serial killer, who uses surveillance technology to manipulate and kill civilians.
- Thomas Coombes as Archie Woodward, Raine's subordinate in the SSCU and one of Robey's blackmail victims.
- Hattie Morahan as Corinne Aldrich, the mother of Robey victim Callum Aldrich.
- Lauryn Ajufo as Anya Raine, Odette's teenage daughter.
- Vincent Regan as Dennis McCabe, a criminal associate of Luther who helps him escape
- Henry Hereford as Brian Lee, one of Robey's blackmail victims.

In addition, Einar Kuusk as Arkady Kachimov, Robey's right-hand man, and Tara Fitzgerald in an uncredited role as Georgette, Robey's ex-wife and victim.

== Production ==
The concept of a film adaptation for the BBC series was broached in August 2013, when series creator Neil Cross revealed he had written a script for a prequel to the series.

In July 2020, Idris Elba stated that there were no "formal plans" for another season of the show, but expressed his desire to return to the role in a film, and that this was close to happening. The film was confirmed in September 2021 for release on Netflix, with Cynthia Erivo and Andy Serkis starring alongside Elba.

Elba announced on 10 November 2021 that filming had begun. Filming took place in London, Iceland and at Lite Studios in Brussels, Belgium.

Lorne Balfe composed the original score, incorporating motifs from Massive Attack's ”Paradise Circus”, which was used as the theme for the television series. The film also features a cover of the aforementioned song.

== Release ==
Luther: The Fallen Sun had a limited theatrical release in select theaters on 24 February 2023, before its streaming release on 10 March 2023, by Netflix.

=== Critical response ===
On the review aggregator website Rotten Tomatoes, 67% of 100 critics' reviews are positive, with an average rating of 6.0/10. The website's consensus reads: "Longtime fans will be happy to have more of Idris Elba's brilliant detective, but Luther: The Fallen Sun is a fairly uninspired addition to his case files." Metacritic, which uses a weighted average, assigned the film a score of 53 out of 100, based on 32 critics, indicating "mixed or average" reviews.

== Sequel ==
In November 2025, it was confirmed that a new Luther movie was in development at Netflix. Ruth Wilson is expected to return in the role of Alice Morgan, having last appeared in the fifth series of the television show, and Dermot Crowley will return as DSU Martin Schenk.
