= Luther 3 =

- Directed by: Jamie Payne
- Written by: Neil Cross
- Based on: Luther by Neil Cross
- Produced by: Peter Chernin; Neil Cross; Idris Elba; Gina Carter; Tim Lewis
- Starring: Idris Elba; Ruth Wilson; Dermot Crowley; Stephen Dillane; Anya Chalotra; Kyle Soller; Ian Hart; Niamh Algar
- Cinematography: Martin Ruhe
- Production companies: BBC Film; Chernin Entertainment
- Distributed by: Netflix
- Countries: United States; United Kingdom
- Language: English

Luther 3 is an upcoming crime thriller film directed by Jamie Payne and written by Neil Cross. It serves as the sequel to Luther: The Fallen Sun (2023) and a film continuation of the crime thriller drama series Luther. It stars Idris Elba (who also serves as a producer on the film), reprising his role as police detective John Luther, alongside Ruth Wilson, Dermot Crowley, Stephen Dillane, Anya Chalotra, Kyle Soller, Ian Hart, and Niamh Algar.

== Cast ==
- Idris Elba as John Luther, a brilliant but disgraced former Detective Chief Inspector.
- Ruth Wilson as Alice Morgan, a research scientist with a genius-level IQ.
- Dermot Crowley as Martin Schenk, the retired former head of the SSCU and Luther's former boss.
- Stephen Dillane
- Anya Chalotra
- Kyle Soller
- Ian Hart
- Niamh Algar

== Production ==
In November 2025, it was announced that a sequel to Luther: The Fallen Sun (2023) was in development, with Jamie Payne and Neil Cross returning to direct and write, and Idris Elba reprising the titular role. Ruth Wilson returns as Alice Morgan from Luther (2010–2019), after previously not appearing in The Fallen Sun. Principal photography began in February 2026, with Stephen Dillane, Anya Chalotra, Kyle Soller, Ian Hart, and Niamh Algar joining the cast.
