= Good Cop =

British police procedural TV series (2012)

- Genre: Police procedural
- Created by: Stephen Butchard
- Written by: Stephen Butchard
- Directed by: Sam Miller; Susan Tully
- Starring: Warren Brown; Michael Angelis; Tom Hopper; Kerrie Hayes; Mark Womack; Philip Hill-Pearson; Aisling Loftus; Stephen Graham; Stephen Walters
- Opening theme: Armies by Tricky
- Composer: Paul Englishby
- Country of origin: United Kingdom
- Original language: English
- No. of series: 1
- No. of episodes: 4

Production
- Executive producer: Jessica Pope
- Producer: Rebecca Hodgson
- Cinematography: Tony Slater-Ling
- Running time: 60 minutes
- Production company: BBC Productions

Original release
- Network: BBC One; BBC One HD
- Release: 30 August – 13 October 2012

Good Cop is a British police procedural television series, written and created by Stephen Butchard, that first broadcast on BBC One on 30 August 2012. The plot centres on an ordinary police constable, John Paul Rocksavage (Warren Brown), whose life changes forever when his best friend and colleague, Andy Stockwell (Tom Hopper), is attacked and killed in a savage ambush.

A single series of four episodes was broadcast weekly at 9:00pm on Thursdays from 30 August 2012. Following the shooting of two police officers in Tameside, Greater Manchester, on 18 September 2012, the BBC postponed the final episode, originally scheduled for Thursday 20 September at 9:00pm. The BBC announced on 28 September that the final episode would air on Saturday 13 October 2012, at a later timeslot of 10:30pm. Consequently, viewing figures for the final episode were much lower than the rest of the series.

The complete series was released on DVD on 15 October 2012, three weeks later than the expected date of 24 September 2012. The series was also released on Region 4 DVD in Australia on 5 June 2013. The BBC stated on 4 February 2013 that Good Cop would not return for a second series although no reason for the cancellation was given.

== Plot ==
Good Cop is set in the city of Liverpool. It follows the work and private lives of John Paul Rocksavage (Warren Brown), a beat police constable working for the Liverpool Metropolitan police, who is partnered with long term friend Andy Stockwell (Tom Hopper).

At home, Rocksavage lives with his disabled father, Robert (Michael Angelis), and reads to him regularly when he is off duty. With each episode, he is reading a different book, all of which have some parallels to Rocksavage's own story. In the first episode, he reads an excerpt from Treasure Island; in the third, a chapter of the Invisible Man; and in the fourth, the first chapter of Crime and Punishment. Rocksavage is also having a secret affair with his dad's married carer, Justine (Christine Tremarco).

Outside of work, Rocksavage is trying to win back his ex-girlfriend, Cassandra (Aisling Loftus), who has returned from the United States with his six-year-old daughter, Libby. Cassandra has a new boyfriend, but Rocksavage struggles to accept this and with the help of his father, does all he can to be a part of Cassandra's life. Rocksavage is also mentoring a teenage informant, Kyle Smart (Shaun Mason), a car thief with a good ear for crimes taking place within the local community.

When Stockwell is attacked and killed in a savage ambush on a routine call out to a domestic disturbance, Rocksavage's life is changed forever. He finds himself partnered with rookie WPC Amanda Morgan (Kerrie Hayes), whom he takes his anger and resentment out on, whilst coming head-to-head with the chief of the Criminal Investigation Department (CID), DCI Craig Costello (Mark Womack), who is overseeing the investigation into Andy's death. After coming face to face with one of Stockwell's killers, Noel Finch (Stephen Graham), Rocksavage crosses the line from law enforcer to law breaker, and soon realises there is no way back.

== Cast ==
- Warren Brown as PC John Paul Rocksavage
- Michael Angelis as Robert Rocksavage
- Tom Hopper as PC Andy Stockwell
- Kerrie Hayes as PC Amanda Morgan
- Mark Womack as DCI Craig Costello
- Philip Hill-Pearson as DC Liam Frainey
- Aisling Loftus as Cassandra Stanton
- Stephen Graham as Noel Finch
- Stephen Walters as Callum Rose
- Joe Macaulay as Jonjo Heinz
- Shaun Mason as Kyle Smart
- Christine Tremarco as Justine
- Johann Myers as PC Gary Walton
- Carl Rice as PC Phil Davenport
- Michael J. Tait as PC Darren Skinner
- Kevin Harvey as Sergeant Middleton
- Jodie Comer as Amy

== Trivia ==
Jodie Comer has a small role in one episode as a waitress who is harassed by Stephen Graham's character. Impressed by Comer's performance, Graham recommended her to his agent, who agreed to represent her; seven years later, after winning the 2019 BAFTA Award for Best Actress for her performance in Killing Eve, Comer thanked Graham for being her mentor and introducing her to his agent.

== Episodes ==
No.	Title	Directed by	Written by	Original release date	UK viewers (millions)
1	"Episode 1"	Sam Miller	Stephen Butchard	30 August 2012	4.82
A bad day for constable Rocksavage begins with an encounter with his estranged girlfriend, Cassandra, and his daughter Libby; a confrontation with a vicious thug, Noel Finch, in a cafe; and later his partner constable Andy Stockwell is fatally injured in a targeted attack by Finch and his gang members. Rocksavage encounters Finch, and is forced by circumstances to shoot him.
2	"Episode 2"	Sam Miller	Stephen Butchard	6 September 2012	4.17
Noel Finch is dead, and Rocksavage soon starts to receive phone calls from one of Finch's associates, Callum Rose, who knows that he was involved in the murder - culminating in a blackmail demand for £100,000. Rose begins to follow Rocksavage, discovering where his estranged girlfriend and current girlfriend live. Rocksavage says he will pay all he can raise, which is £35,000. Later, he beats and then kills Rose after breaking into his home.
3	"Episode 3"	Sue Tully	Stephen Butchard	13 September 2012	4.39
Rocksavage takes photos of his daughter Libby, Cassandra, and her new boyfriend. This causes him more grief, which is compounded when he gives a heartfelt eulogy at Andy's funeral. Two possible witnesses to the murder of Callum Rose are interviewed but the evidence is inconclusive. One witness, Bradley Pearson, becomes involved in a domestic dispute, resulting in a siege concluded by Rocksavage's intervention. Homicide detectives bring in Jonjo Heinz, identified by Rocksavage as a third gang member who attacked Andy, but he is released due to a lack of hard evidence. Rocksavage plants the murder weapon used to kill Finch and Rose in Heinz's home.
4	"Episode 4"	Sue Tully	Stephen Butchard	13 October 2012	Under 4.23
Rocksavage recovers the gun from where he planted it and later breaks into Jonjo Heinz's house, apparently intending to kill him. However, before he can confront Heinz, the police arrive to search the property, forcing Rocksavage to flee. Heinz is arrested and held for drugs-related charges, but the police find insufficient evidence to charge him with Andy's murder. Rocksavage meets Cassandra and tells her that he wants to be part of his daughter's life. Morgan agrees to pose as a student to catch two men who have been attacking young women, but when the undercover operation goes wrong, Rocksavage decides to take action.
