= Luther (TV series) =

British crime drama television series

- Genre: Crime drama; Police procedural; Psychological thriller
- Created by: Neil Cross
- Written by: Neil Cross
- Starring: Idris Elba; Ruth Wilson; Steven Mackintosh; Indira Varma; Paul McGann; Saskia Reeves; Warren Brown; Dermot Crowley; Nikki Amuka-Bird; Aimee-Ffion Edwards; Kierston Wareing; Pam Ferris; David Dawson; Sienna Guillory; David O'Hara; Michael Smiley; Darren Boyd; Rose Leslie; Laura Haddock; Patrick Malahide; Wunmi Mosaku; Enzo Cilenti; Hermione Norris
- Opening theme: "Paradise Circus" by Massive Attack
- Composer: Paul Englishby
- Country of origin: United Kingdom
- Original language: English
- No. of series: 5
- No. of episodes: 20 (list of episodes)

Production
- Producer: Katie Swinden
- Running time: 51–63 minutes
- Production company: BBC Studios Drama Productions

Original release
- Network: BBC One
- Release: 4 May 2010 – 4 January 2019

Related
- Luther: The Fallen Sun

Luther is a British psychological crime thriller television series starring Idris Elba as DCI John Luther and Ruth Wilson as Alice Morgan, written by Neil Cross. The detective Luther must make cases against criminals while the murderer Morgan has a complicated relationship with him. The first series is composed of six episodes which ran in May and June 2010. A second series of four episodes aired on BBC One in June and July 2011, and a third was commissioned in 2012 composed of four episodes which aired in July 2013. A two-episode fourth series was broadcast in December 2015, and a fifth series of four episodes premiered on 1 January 2019. BBC Studios handled distribution for the TV series.

A feature film continuation, Luther: The Fallen Sun, was released in select cinemas on 24 February 2023, before its streaming release on 10 March 2023, by Netflix. Starring Elba, Andy Serkis and Cynthia Erivo, the film was written by Cross. A second film is in development.

Elba has been awarded a Critics' Choice Television Award, Golden Globe Award, and Screen Actors Guild Award for his performance as John Luther. The series has also received eleven Primetime Emmy Award nominations in various categories, including four nominations of Elba for Outstanding Lead Actor in a Miniseries or Movie.

== Plot ==
John Luther is a Detective Chief Inspector (DCI) working for the Serious Crime Unit in series one, and the new "Serious and Serial" unit from series two. A dedicated police officer, Luther is obsessive, possessed, and sometimes violent. However, Luther has paid a heavy price for his dedication; he has never been able to prevent himself from being consumed by the darkness of the crimes with which he deals.

For Luther, the job always comes first. His dedication is a curse and a blessing, both for him and those close to him. In the first episode of the series, he investigates brilliant psychopath and murderer Alice Morgan. Ultimately, he is unable to arrest her due to lack of evidence, but as the series progresses, she becomes both his nemesis and unlikely companion. As she pursues her infatuation with him, he gradually relents as he is able to glean insight from her about some of the cunning criminals he pursues. After Alice helps Luther avenge the death of his estranged wife Zoe, Luther aids her escape from a secure facility and she flees the country. In Alice's absence, Luther's life is dominated by his police work once again, culminating in the murder of his partner and protégé Justin Ripley in the third series. Alice reappears following Ripley's death, and finally convinces Luther to leave London with her.

When the fourth series begins, Luther is living a reclusive life on the English coast. After learning of Alice's apparent death in mysterious circumstances, he is persuaded to return to London and resume his role as a DCI. It ultimately transpires that Alice faked her own death after her life with Luther did not match their expectations. Two years later she returns to extort money from organised crime boss George Cornelius, who sabotaged her previous diamond exchange. Embroiled in her schemes again, Luther's relationship with Alice heads towards its destructive climax.

== Cast and characters ==
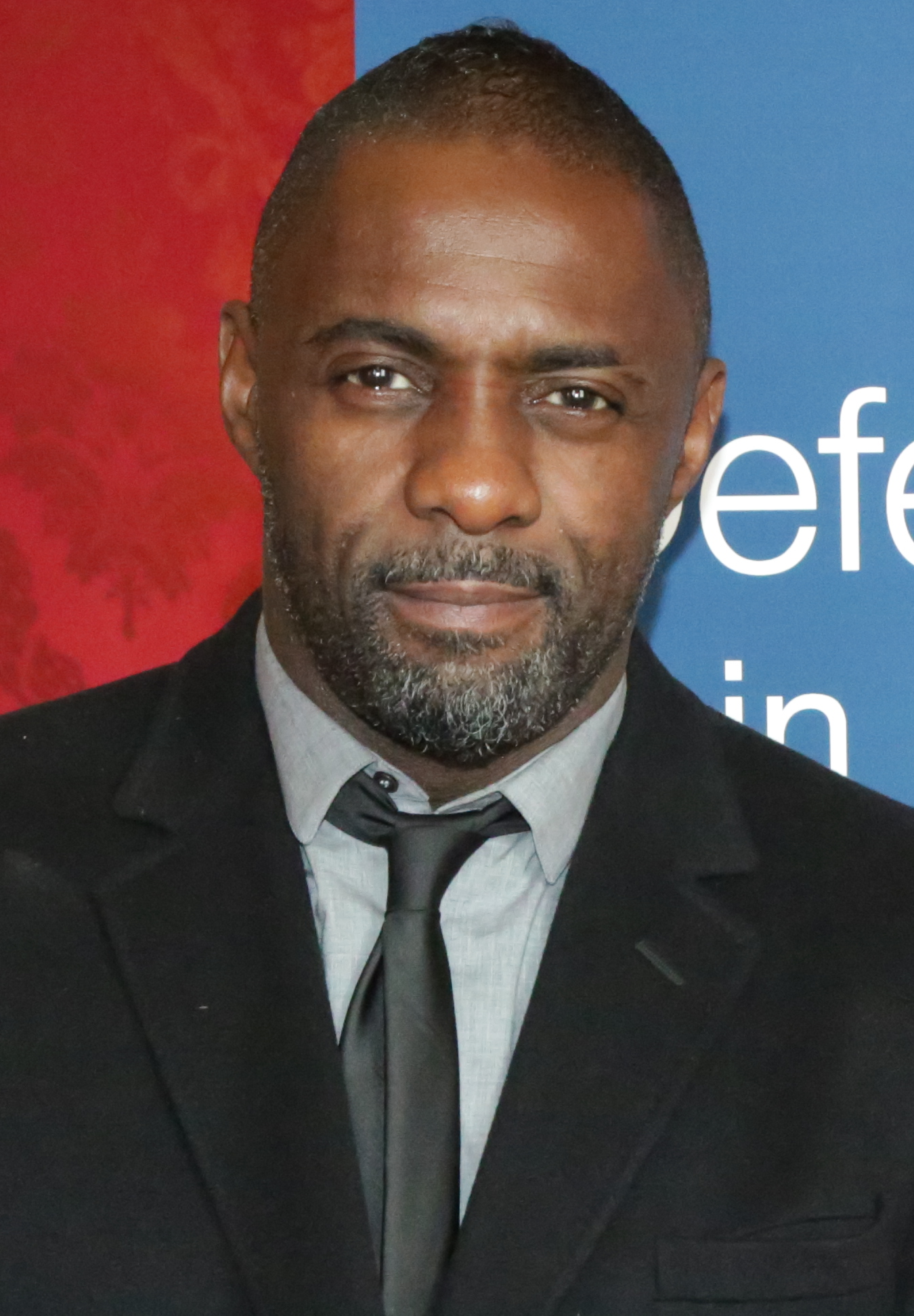
Idris Elba stars as the show's eponymous character, Detective Chief Inspector John Luther.

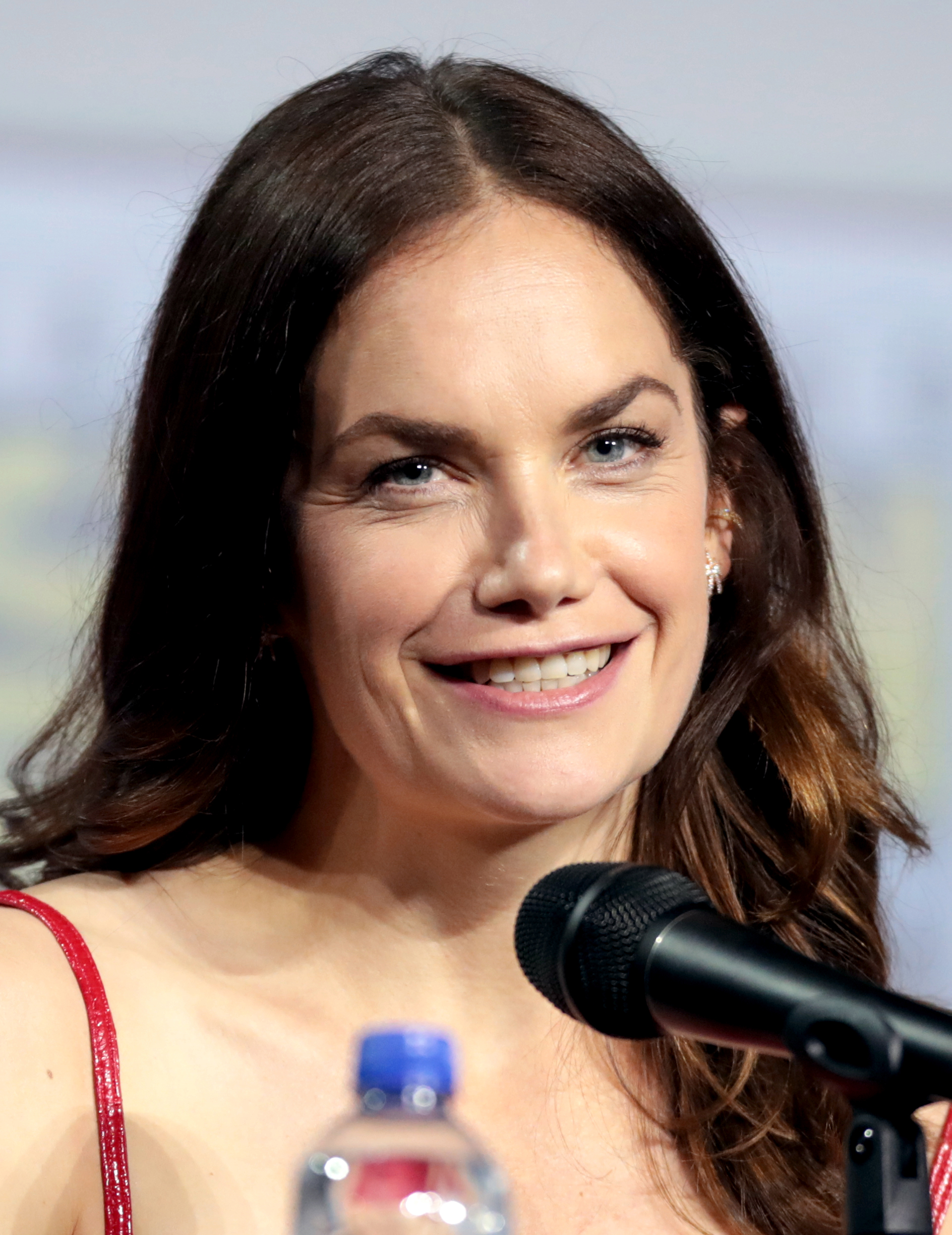
Ruth Wilson co-stars as criminal fugitive and Luther's love interest Alice Morgan.

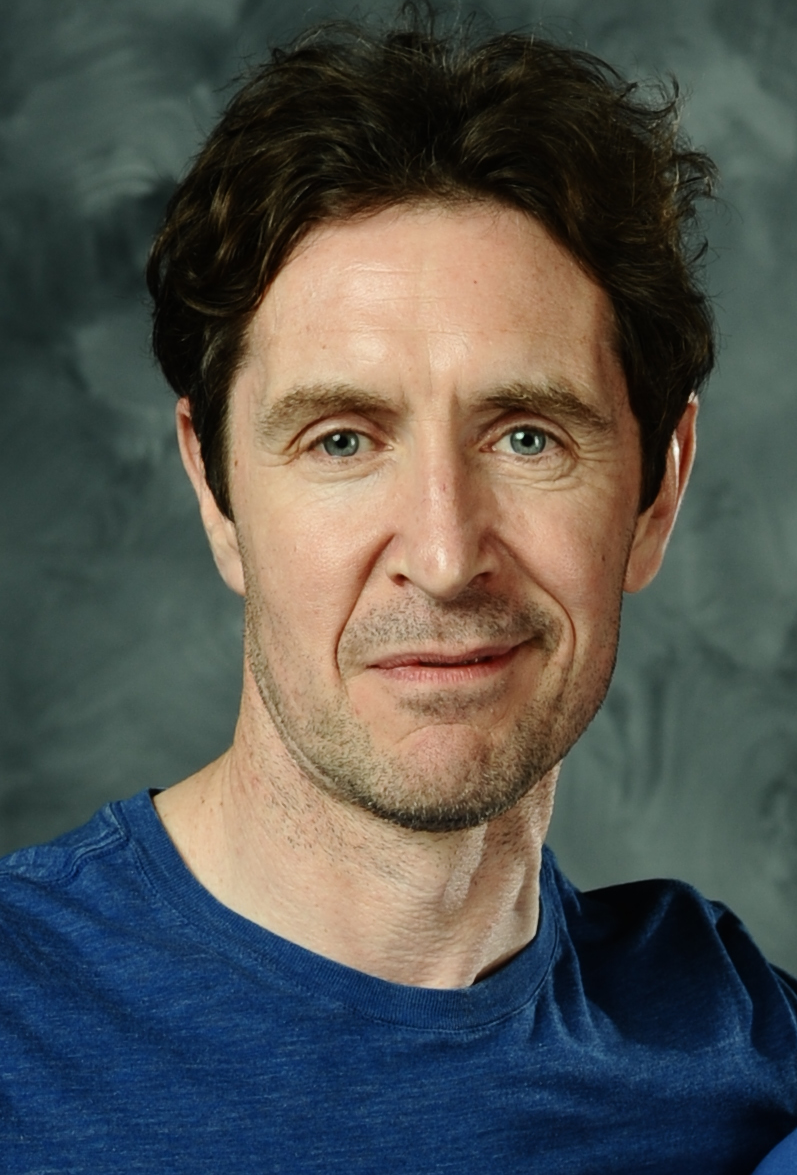
Paul McGann co-stars as human rights lawyer Mark North.

Character	Portrayed by	Series					Film
Character	Portrayed by	1	2	3	4	5	Film
DCI John Luther	Idris Elba	Main	Main	Main	Main	Main	Main
Alice Morgan	Ruth Wilson	Main	Main	Featured		Main	
DCI Ian Reed	Steven Mackintosh	Main					
Zoe Luther	Indira Varma	Main					
Mark North	Paul McGann	Main	Main			Recurring	
DSU Rose Teller	Saskia Reeves	Main					
DS Justin Ripley	Warren Brown	Main	Main	Main	Featured		
DCI/DSU Martin Schenk	Dermot Crowley	Main	Main	Main	Main	Main	Main
DS/DCI Erin Gray	Nikki Amuka-Bird		Main	Main			
Jenny Jones	Aimee-Ffion Edwards		Main				
Baba	Pam Ferris		Main				
Toby Kent	David Dawson		Main				
Mary Day	Sienna Guillory			Main			
DSU George Stark	David O'Hara			Main			
DS Benny Silver	Michael Smiley	Recurring	Recurring	Recurring	Main	Main	
DCI Theo Bloom	Darren Boyd				Featured		
DS Emma Lane	Rose Leslie				Main		
Megan Cantor	Laura Haddock				Main		
George Cornelius	Patrick Malahide				Main	Main	
DS Catherine Halliday	Wunmi Mosaku					Main	
Jeremy Lake	Enzo Cilenti					Main	
Vivien Lake	Hermione Norris					Main	
DCI Odette Raine	Cynthia Erivo						Main
David Robey	Andy Serkis						Main

== Episodes ==
Series	Episodes	Originally released		Avg. UK viewers (millions)
Series	Episodes	First released	Last released	Avg. UK viewers (millions)
1	6	4 May 2010	8 June 2010	4.83
2	4	14 June 2011	5 July 2011	6.43
3	4	2 July 2013	23 July 2013	5.98
4	2	15 December 2015	22 December 2015	7.92
5	4	1 January 2019	4 January 2019	9.45
Film		24 February 2023		–

=== Series 1 (2010) ===
The first series of Luther aired in 2010 and received positive reviews from critics, getting an average of 5.9 million viewers per episode.

=== Series 2 (2011) ===
In August 2010, the BBC announced that it had commissioned a second series for 2011. Filming started in late September/early October 2010. Originally planned to be broadcast as two two-hour episodes, it was shown as four one-hour episodes. The first episode was shown on BBC One on 14 June 2011.

=== Series 3 (2013) ===
In August 2011, the BBC One controller announced that a third series had been commissioned.

Filming of the four-episode series started in November 2012. Sienna Guillory was cast as Luther's new love interest. Other guest stars included Lucian Msamati and Ned Dennehy. The third series began airing on 2 July 2013 and concluded on 23 July.

=== Series 4 (2015) ===
On 19 November 2014, it was announced that a two-episode special would be aired on the BBC in 2015. Filming began in March 2015 and ended April 2015. BBC Home Entertainment later confirmed that the Region 1 version of the Series 4 DVD would be released on 15 December 2015, coinciding with the air date of the fourth series. On 24 October 2015, BBC One confirmed via their Facebook page that series 4 of Luther would air in December 2015 on BBC One.

In November 2015, it was announced that Luther was confirmed to air in the United States on BBC America for a three-hour one-night event on 17 December 2015.

The first episode of the fourth series aired on BBC One on 15 December 2015.

=== Series 5 (2019) ===
The BBC announced a fifth series composed of four episodes on 12 June 2017. Filming started in early 2018. Ruth Wilson was confirmed to be returning as Alice Morgan for series five. Series 5 directed by Jamie Payne premiered on 1 January 2019, and was broadcast over consecutive nights through to 4 January.

=== Film series (2023–present) ===
In September 2021, Netflix announced a feature film continuation of Luther with Elba reprising his role and Cross writing. Andy Serkis and Cynthia Erivo also joined the cast, with Dermot Crowley reprising his role as Schenk. The film, Luther: The Fallen Sun, was released in select cinemas on 24 February 2023, before its streaming release on 10 March 2023, by Netflix.

In November 2025, a second film, under the working title of Luther 3, was announced. Elba will reprise his roles along with Ruth Wilson, whose character did not appear in the previous film, and Crowley.

== Production ==
Creator Neil Cross conceived the series under the working title of The Calling, which was later used as the title of the novel prequel. Cross has said that Luther is influenced by both Sherlock Holmes and Columbo; the nature of Luther's intellect and its application to solving crimes is comparable to Holmes's, whereas the show's use of the inverted detective format was inspired by Columbo.

The first series was filmed in and around London, England, and produced by BBC Drama Productions. Brian Kirk, Sam Miller and Stefan Schwartz each directed two episodes and show creator Neil Cross wrote all six of the episodes. Leila Kirkpatrick was the line producer for the entire program and Katie Swinden was the producer for a number of episodes. Tim Fleming provided cinematography for two episodes. Katie Weiland and Victoria Boydell were involved in film editing, with Weiland editing two episodes. Andy Morgan was responsible for all casting, Paul Cross provided production design and Adam A. Makin was behind the show's art direction.

The show is filmed in various locations around Central, North, West and East London including the Barbican Estate, Elephant and Castle, Westfield Shopping Centre (Shepherd's Bush), Renaissance Hotel (Heathrow Airport), Ealing Hospital, Cranbrook Estate (Bethnal Green), Victoria Park, Waterloo station, Holloway, Shoreditch and the Docklands.

== Critical reception ==
Series one was met with positive reviews, according to aggregate review site Rotten Tomatoes, where it holds a 91% approval rating, based on 23 reviews. The site's consensus reads: "Gritty and ambiguous, Luther is a captivating drama bolstered by a powerhouse performance from Idris Elba in the title role." It holds a Metacritic score of 82 out of 100, based on 11 collected reviews, indicating "universal acclaim". However, The Guardian's Stuart Heritage was initially critical of the show, and compared it to the American series FlashForward, in that both series arrived with a large amount of hype but delivered an anticlimactic end product. However, by the fifth episode, Heritage had changed his views and called it Idris Elba's best work since The Wire.

The show's second series was met with equally positive reviews and holds a 100% approval rating on Rotten Tomatoes, based on 13 reviews. The site's consensus reads: "Luther delves into darker territory in its second series, and Idris Elba's outstanding performance makes this a police procedural of uncommon weight and heft." It holds a Metacritic score of 78 out of 100, based on 9 collected reviews, indicating "Generally favorable reviews". Variety and The Hollywood Reporter admiringly highlighted the darker tone, Elba's performance, and the production. In the third quarter of 2011, the top-rated shows on BBC America were Doctor Who, Top Gear, and Luther, which together gained the network its highest quarterly ratings ever.

Series three was again met with positive reviews and holds an 88% approval rating on Rotten Tomatoes, based on 25 reviews. The site's consensus reads: "Idris Elba shines in the title role of Luther despite familiar circumstances that benefit from the shortened season." It holds a Metacritic score of 76 out of 100, based on 19 collected reviews, indicating "Generally favorable reviews".

Series four received positive reviews, with a 79% approval rating on Rotten Tomatoes, based on 14 reviews. The site's consensus reads: "Idris Elba remains the best thing about Luther in an all-too-brief season which packs a lot of plot into a short time frame." It holds a Metacritic score of 68 out of 100, based on 11 reviews, indicating "Generally favorable reviews".

After a four-year hiatus, the Series five broadcast in 2019 met with positive reviews, garnering an 85% approval rating on Rotten Tomatoes, based on 40 reviews. The site's consensus reads: "Luther returns in fine form from its extended exodus with a grisly mystery and the welcome reappearance of Ruth Wilson's psychotic villain, Alice Morgan."

== Broadcast outside of the United Kingdom ==
The first series of the show premiered in Australia on ABC1 on 15 October 2010 and in the United States on BBC America two days later. The second series debuted in the United States on BBC America on 29 September 2011 and Australia on ABC1 on 24 February 2012. The third series ran in the United States on BBC America on four consecutive nights beginning 3 September 2013. The fifth series premiered in the United States on BBC America on 2 June 2019. The deal also includes the network to show the first six seasons of another series produced by the BBC, Death in Paradise, airing on Thursdays at 7 pm and airing on Fridays at 8 am ET part of the "Morning Mysteries" morning mystery crime drama block.

== Soundtrack ==
Paul Englishby composed Luther's soundtrack. He incorporated many pop and rock songs into the soundtrack, using these generally in the end credits. A CD titled Luther – Songs and Score From Series 1, 2 and 3 was released on 19 August 2013 and contains many of the themes and songs used in the television series. The opening theme song is a shorter version of "Paradise Circus" by Massive Attack from the album Heligoland (2010) with vocals provided by Hope Sandoval.

== Awards and nominations ==
Year	Association	Category	Nominee(s)	Result
2010	Crime Thriller Awards	Best Supporting Actress	Saskia Reeves	Nominated
2010	Satellite Awards	Best Actor – Miniseries or Television Film	Idris Elba	Nominated
2010	Satellite Awards	Best Actress – Miniseries or Television Film	Ruth Wilson	Nominated
2010	Royal Television Society Craft & Design Awards	Graphic Design - Titles	Momoco	Nominated
2011	Golden Globe Awards	Best Actor – Miniseries or Television Film	Idris Elba	Nominated
2011	NAACP Image Awards	Outstanding Actor in a Television Movie, Mini-Series, or Dramatic Special	Idris Elba	Won
2011	NAACP Image Awards	Outstanding Television Movie, Mini-Series, or Dramatic Special	Luther	Nominated
2011	Primetime Emmy Awards	Outstanding Lead Actor in a Miniseries or Movie	Idris Elba	Nominated
2012	Critics' Choice Television Awards	Best Actor in a Movie/Miniseries	Idris Elba	Nominated
2012	Critics' Choice Television Awards	Best Movie/Miniseries	Luther	Nominated
2012	Golden Globe Awards	Best Actor – Miniseries or Television Film	Idris Elba	Won
2012	NAACP Image Awards	Outstanding Actor in a Television Movie, Mini-Series, or Dramatic Special	Idris Elba	Nominated
2012	NAACP Image Awards	Outstanding Television Movie, Mini-Series, or Dramatic Special	Luther	Nominated
2012	Primetime Emmy Awards	Outstanding Directing for a Miniseries, Movie, or Dramatic Special	Sam Miller	Nominated
2012	Primetime Emmy Awards	Outstanding Lead Actor in a Miniseries or Movie	Idris Elba	Nominated
2012	Primetime Emmy Awards	Outstanding Miniseries or Movie	Luther	Nominated
2012	Primetime Emmy Awards	Outstanding Writing for a Miniseries, Movie, or Dramatic Special	Neil Cross	Nominated
2012	Royal Television Society Awards	Drama Series	Luther	Won
2012	Satellite Awards	Best Actor – Miniseries or Television Film	Idris Elba	Nominated
2012	Satellite Awards	Best Miniseries or Television Film	Luther	Nominated
2013	Crime Thriller Awards	Best TV Drama	Luther	Nominated
2013	Crime Thriller Awards	Best Leading Actor	Idris Elba	Nominated
2013	Crime Thriller Awards	Best Supporting Actor	Warren Brown	Nominated
2013	Crime Thriller Awards	Best Supporting Actress	Ruth Wilson	Nominated
2013	Royal Television Society Craft & Design Awards	Tape & Film Editing - Drama	Katie Welland	Won
2014	Critics' Choice Television Awards	Best Movie/Miniseries	Luther	Nominated
2014	Critics' Choice Television Awards	Best Supporting Actor in a Movie/Miniseries	Warren Brown	Nominated
2014	Golden Globe Awards	Best Actor – Miniseries or Television Film	Idris Elba	Nominated
2014	NAACP Image Awards	Outstanding Actor in a Television Movie, Mini-Series, or Dramatic Special	Idris Elba	Won
2014	NAACP Image Awards	Outstanding Television Movie, Mini-Series, or Dramatic Special	Luther	Nominated
2014	Primetime Emmy Awards	Outstanding Lead Actor in a Miniseries or Movie	Idris Elba	Nominated
2014	Primetime Emmy Awards	Outstanding Miniseries	Luther	Nominated
2014	Primetime Emmy Awards	Outstanding Writing for a Miniseries, Movie, or Dramatic Special	Neil Cross	Nominated
2014	Royal Television Society Awards	Actor: Male	Idris Elba	Won
2016	BAFTA Television Awards	Best Actor	Idris Elba	Nominated
2016	Golden Globe Awards	Best Actor – Miniseries or Television Film	Idris Elba	Nominated
2016	NAACP Image Awards	Outstanding Television Movie, Mini-Series, or Dramatic Special	Luther	Nominated
2016	NAACP Image Awards	Outstanding Actor in a Television Movie, Mini-Series, or Dramatic Special	Idris Elba	Nominated
2016	Critics' Choice Television Awards	Best Actor in a Movie/Miniseries	Idris Elba	Won
2016	Screen Actors Guild Award	Outstanding Performance by a Male Actor in a Miniseries or Television Movie	Idris Elba	Won
2016	Primetime Emmy Awards	Outstanding Lead Actor in a Limited Series or Movie	Idris Elba	Nominated
2016	Primetime Emmy Awards	Outstanding Television Movie	Luther	Nominated
2016	Primetime Emmy Awards	Outstanding Cinematography for a Limited Series or Movie	Luther	Nominated

== Adaptations ==
=== American version ===
In 2014, Fox started developing an American TV series version of Luther, with Cross writing and executive producing the series, and Elba, Peter Chernin (of the Chernin company), Katherine Pope, and BBC Worldwide Prods' Jane Tranter and Julie Gardner as executive producers. The project was helmed by 20th Century Fox TV, Chernin Entertainment, and BBC Worldwide Prods. The project was formally dropped in 2017.

=== Russian version ===
In 2014, Channel One Russia was developing a Russian TV series version of Luther, with Konstantin Lavronenko, starring as Klim. The series was first broadcast on 31 January 2016.

=== Korean version ===
On 5 February 2018, South Korean TV network Munhwa Broadcasting Corporation (MBC) announced that it will broadcast a Korean version of Luther. The adaptation will be broadcast in November 2018 and is produced by the MBC Drama Production Group. In August 2018, Shin Ha-kyun was cast as male lead.

The series title was changed later into Less Than Evil (나쁜 형사, lit. "Bad Detective"). It aired on MBC on 3 December 2018.

=== Indian version ===
Indian actor Ajay Devgan announced that he'll be starring in the Indian adaptation of Luther, titled Rudra: The Edge Of Darkness. The first season of the series premiered on 4 March 2022 on Disney+ Hotstar.

=== French version ===
The French television channel TF1 has ordered a remake of the British television series which is filmed in the city of Paris and its suburbs. The first episode of the French version gained 4.8 million viewers.

== Novel ==
In August 2011, Cross released a tie-in prequel novel Luther: The Calling following the broadcast of the second season, focusing on the events surrounding the Henry Madsen case briefly seen in the first episode. Two further novels were ordered, but were never released.
