= Philip Hill-Pearson =

British actor (born 1987)

- Born: 16 June 1987 (age 38); Bradford, West Yorkshire, England
- Occupation: Actor
- Years active: 2010–present

Philip Hill-Pearson is a British actor. He is best known for his roles as Bruce Donnelly in Shameless (2010) and as D.C. Clough in Coronation Street (2016–2018).

== Early life ==
He trained at East 15 Acting School, graduating in 2009. Shortly after graduating from the drama school, he was cast as Bruce Donnelly in the comedy drama series Shameless.

== Career ==
He went on to work in a range of differing television programmes, including Good Cop and Doctors, and also films such as United, with David Tennant, and Steven Spielberg's adaptation of Michael Morpurgo's War Horse. Alongside his extensive work in British film and television, Pearson also worked with the Hull Truck Theatre on their stage production of The Rise and Fall of Little Voice in 2011, playing the role of Billy.

== Filmography ==
=== Film ===
Year	Title	Role	Ref.
2011	United	Eddie Colman	
2011	Tinker Tailor Soldier Spy	Norman	
2011	War Horse	Wounded Soldier	
2021	Boiling Point	Mark	

=== Television ===
Year	Title	Role	Notes
2010	Shameless	Bruce Donnelly	7 episodes
2011-2025	Emmerdale	Jared Haynes	12 episodes
2012	Good Cop	D.C. Liam Frainey	4 episodes
2013	WPC 56	Frank Marshall	5 episodes
2013, 2015	Doctors	Jay Scagell / Norman Wattle	3 episodes
2014	Common	Tony	TV film
2015	No Offence	Jimmy Webb	Episode #1.3
2016	Vera	Lee Stonnall	Episode: "The Sea Glass"
2016–2018	Coronation Street	D.C. Hough	Recurring role
2017	Three Girls	Barrister	Episode #1.3
2017	Gunpowder	Sir Everard Digby	3 episodes
2019	The Bay	Ryan Foley	4 episodes
2020	The English Game	Tom Hindle	6 episodes
2021	The North Water	McKendrick	4 episodes
2021	All Creatures Great and Small	Rob Benson	Episode: "Where the Heart Is"
2022	Ridley	Stewart Daley	Episode: "Hospitality"
2023	Smother	Leon	5 episodes
2023	The Long Shadow	P.S. Robert Ring	Episode #1.7
2023	Time	Orla's Bar Boss	Episode #2.2
2024	The Jetty	Rob	Episode #1.1
2025	Casualty	Detective Simon Bell	2 episodes
2025	Toxic Town	Max	1 episode
2025	Andor	Plug	2 episodes
2025	Suspect: The Shooting of Jean Charles de Menezes	Frank (Surveillance officer)	1 episode
2026	A Woman of Substance	Joe Lowther	4 episodes

== Theatre credits ==
Year	Title	Role	Notes
2011	The Rise and Fall of Little Voice	Billy	Hull Truck Theatre
