= Sherwood (2019 TV series) =

Animated television series

- Genre: Science fiction; Cyberpunk; Adventure
- Created by: Diana Manson; Megan Laughton
- Developed by: Justin Trefgarne
- Written by: Justin Trefgarne
- Directed by: Bruce Carter
- Voices of: Anya Chalotra; Tyler Posey; Aneurin Barnard; Jamie Chung; Rachel House; Adetokumboh M'Cormack; Joseph Fiennes
- Composers: Roahn Hylton; Jacob Yoffee
- Countries of origin: United States; Ireland; New Zealand
- Original language: English
- No. of seasons: 1
- No. of episodes: 10

Production
- Executive producer: Nanette Miles
- Editor: Matt Tate
- Running time: 21-22 minutes
- Production companies: Giant Animation; Toybox Animation; Baby Octopus; YouTube Originals

Original release
- Network: YouTube Premium
- Release: March 6, 2019

Sherwood is an animated science fiction web series created by Diana Manson and Megan Laughton that premiered on March 6, 2019, on YouTube Premium. It is a new telling of the Robin Hood legend. Some reviewers have noted the focus on socioeconomic class, as Robin lives among "the impoverished 99%," leading rebels who will overthrow the Sheriff, who lives in an Upper City housing "the wealthy citizens of Sherwood." Others also noted the focus on class difference, with Robin and her comrades trying to "overcome inequality and fight for justice." Apart from this, others said the series has a cyberpunk feeling to it.

The show had a world premiere in Sydney, Australia, in March 2019. In April 2020, Sherwood was one of the originals that Google decided to make freely available in light of COVID-19 pandemic.

== Premise ==
In the year 2270, in the dystopic 23rd century, 14-year-old hacker Robin Loxley and her friends battle the Sheriff of Nottingham in a Britain devastated by environmental disaster.

== Characters ==
=== Main ===
- Robin Loxley (voiced by Anya Chalotra) is the main protagonist of the series. She often has to fight and steal from the Sheriff of Nottingham, to protect Sherwood. She is called "Insurgent Hood" by the Sheriff and his allies, also once takes the alias of "Marian Johns." She is presumed killed in the Upper City's destruction.
- Iniko (voiced by Tyler Posey) is one of the main protagonists, the pilot of the submarine Amphy, and a self proclaimed Sea Pirate.
- Gisbourne (voiced by Aneurin Barnard) is the son of the Sheriff of Nottingham and is the Head of Security of the Regime. He often commands the Drobos and attempts to catch the Insurgents.
- Sheriff Nottingham (voiced by Joseph Fiennes) is the main antagonist of the Sherwood series and rules the Upper City. He is the head of the Regime, with Gisbourne as his Head of Security (and son). Betrayed by his son, he is presumed killed in the Upper City's destruction as Robin.

=== Supporting ===
- Tui (voiced by Rachel House) is like a mother to Robin, and helps her around the Kelp Farm.
- Gripper (voiced by Adetokumboh M'Cormack) is part of Robin's crew and acts like a father to Juba.
- Rose Trefgarne (voiced by Jamie Chung) is a protagonist, often helping out the main cast. Formerly a resident of The Upper City, she now resides in Sherwood.
- Thomas Loxley (voiced by Darrill Rosen) is a scientist and inventor, and is the father of Robin Loxley.
- Juba (voiced by Neneh Conteh) is a small girl with dark skin and light blonde hair like Gripper and who is a refugee before she came to Sherwood.

== Production ==
The idea for the series was originally posed by Diana Manson and Megan Laughton, of a New York company named Baby Octopus, in 2016, to Justin Trefgarne. Additionally, the show is, according to Trefgarne, aimed at "the pre-teen market," and is focused "on positive female empowerment." The production company, Baby Octopus, worked with the Computer Science in Media team of Google to help imagine "world of the future and what it meant for design, travel, technology and society," and to inspire "young women and girls on their role in technology of the future." Trefgarne, in an August 2018 post on his website, noted that he was commissioned to write the pilot script in 2016, with YouTube ordering nine additional episodes in January 2017, and continued production, with an original release date in November 2018. He also stated that the series is "inspired by the classic Manga Akira," a Japanese cyberpunk manga series set in a post-apocalyptic and futuristic Neo-Tokyo, more than two decades after a mysterious explosion destroyed the city.

In February 2019, a number of behind-the-scenes specials were released about the show. In the first one, on February 22, director Bruce Carter talked about the setting of the show in a futuristic London, which those in this story call "Sherwood," with the story based around Robin and her "merry band" of followers. In the same special, executive producer Nanette Miles said that the show would inspire "lots of young girls," production designer Daniel McKay called Robin a "tinkerer" who can easily adapt technology, and production coordinator Freya Walker Smith called her a "cool girl" who fights for herself and a "powerful heroine who can code." In the second special, on February 26, music producers Jacob Yoffee and Roahn Hylton said they wanted to make the audience pay attention and listen to what is going on in the story, trying to make the world larger and feel more realistic. Yoffee also said that Bruce Carter, wanted a futuristic sound, with world music "more infused" into the mainstream and said they worked with Mickey Shiloh, on all the songs. Hylton also described Robin as a hero "everyone can get behind," with her theme having a "superhero element" to it, plus a "bit of sadness" because she is searching "for her identity." In the last special, on February 28, Anya Chalotra, who voices Robin, said that if she was 14, Robin would be her friend and would inspire (and empower) her. Chalotra further called Robin self-sufficient and dedicated to "making the world a better place" which is more equal, talked about the challenge of playing such a "complex character" and stated she "sets an amazing example of a young leader." At the same time, Erin Rainaldi, a software engineer from Verily who works on the show, said that it's important to show that women and girls are just as good at "technology and tinkering" than boys, saying it sets an example for young girls, and Jamie Chung, who voices Rose, called Robin fun and a rebel, hoping the show does the same in speaking to young girls. Bernadette Carter, a software engineer from Google called Robin a "strong female lead," not letting others tell her what to do, while balancing it with compassion for others, and is determined and dedicated to her goals.

== Episodes ==
=== Season 1 (2019) ===
No.	Title	Written by	Original release date
1	"The Future Robin Hood"	Justin Trefgarne	March 6, 2019
In a 23rd-century flooded city, a teenager named Robin recognizes her path forward, different than anything she ever thought, when she puts on a gauntlet once owned by her father.
2	"Robin Gives to the Poor"	Justin Trefgarne & Robby Hoffman	March 6, 2019
Robin and her fellow vigilantes have a goal: protecting a crucial new source of nourishment from Sheriff Nottingham and his minions, the drobos.
3	"Robin Dives Deep"	Justin Trefgarne & Robby Hoffman	March 6, 2019
After they are trapped under the sea, Robin and her newfound friends learn the reality about what happened in the past to their home.
4	"Robin Picks a Fight"	Justin Trefgarne & Craig Martin	March 6, 2019
Attempting to ensnare Robin, the Sheriff hosts a fighting contest. Will she go for the bait, or stay away?
5	"Robin Breaks the Code"	Justin Trefgarne	March 6, 2019
A strange machine from the Upper City is poisoning Sherwood's freshwater supply. What will Robin and her comrades do?
6	"Robin Lost at Sea"	Justin Trefgarne	March 6, 2019
Iniko and Robin work together to fix his submarine, stranded in the ocean, before they meet certain doom.
7	"Robin Under Siege"	Justin Trefgarne & Craig Martin	March 6, 2019
In a bold move, Nottingham launches a large-scale raid against those living in the Lower City, putting everyone in jeopardy.
8	"Robin Meets Her Maker"	Justin Trefgarne & Mike Lew	March 6, 2019
Robin talks to her father face-to-face in their first interaction ever. Evil remains, with Nottingham determined to eliminate her as a threat once and for all...
9	"Robin Rebuilds"	Justin Trefgarne & Craig Martin	March 6, 2019
After the attack in the previous episode, Sea Croppers try to bounce back, as a mysterious person helps them, someone who Robin and her friends do not expect to see...
10	"Robin Rises"	Justin Trefgarne	March 6, 2019
After Gisbourne causes a self-destruct sequence to begin, affecting the Upper City, Robin has the horrifying realization: only she can stop it.

== Reception ==
Common Sense Media, a family-friendly media review site, gave the series an aggregate of three stars, stating its themes made it suitable for older viewers. Alexis Gunderson of Paste Magazine listed it as one of the 13 Best Original TV Shows on YouTube Premium in 2019. Gunderson said that while it may look similar to Star Wars: The Clone Wars, it is an original, with visually layered scenes and set in a "distressing believable" dystopia, while saying she appreciates it for its own merits, calling it a compelling family-friendly animation. Apart from this, in the show's first week on YouTube, the show's first episode garnered seven million views, something which series writer and developer Justin Trefgarne said he was delighted by.

== See also ==
- List of films and television series featuring Robin Hood
