= Single Father (TV series) =

- Genre: Drama
- Written by: Mick Ford
- Directed by: Sam Miller
- Starring: David Tennant; Suranne Jones; Laura Fraser
- Composer: Murray Gold
- Country of origin: United Kingdom
- Original language: English
- No. of series: 1
- No. of episodes: 4

Production
- Executive producers: Anne Mensah; Nicola Shindler
- Producer: Peter Gallagher
- Production locations: Glasgow and Paisley
- Editor: Katie Weiland
- Production companies: Red Production Company; BBC Scotland

Original release
- Network: BBC One
- Release: 10 October – 31 October 2010

Single Father is a four-episode 2010 BBC television drama centred on Dave (David Tennant), a photographer attempting to look after his children as a single father after the death of his partner, Rita (Laura Fraser), in a road traffic accident. The series also explores the complicated and growing romance between Dave and Rita's best friend, Sarah (Suranne Jones). The series began airing on BBC One on 10 October 2010 at a 9pm timeslot, with 5 million viewers.

== Plot ==
Photographer Dave Tiler lives with his partner Rita, their three children, and Rita's older daughter of unknown paternity, Lucy. Dave also has an older daughter named Tanya (who has a son of her own, and works as Dave's assistant) from his first marriage. Rita works at a school with her best friend Sarah, who is unsure about whether to start a family with her partner Matt. The Tilers' lives are thrown into chaos when Rita is hit and killed by a police car; the children try to come to terms with the death of their mother, and Dave struggles to cope with raising them alone. Dave and Sarah share a grief-stricken kiss, and are unsure of their attraction to each other.

When Lucy starts a quest to find her real father, the shocking results leading Dave to question the paternity of his and Rita's other children. In anger at Rita's dishonesty in keeping Lucy's paternity and her relationship with the father a secret, and questioning Rita's fidelity, Dave sleeps with Sarah, who is angry and hurt when Dave starts post-coitally ranting about Rita. At the same time he begins to doubt if the three other children are really his. Dave faces growing financial problems, problems with his grief-stricken children, and potentially losing Lucy to her biological father. Meanwhile Matt discovers that Sarah has cheated on him with Dave, and sleeps with Tanya as revenge, leading to a showdown at Dave's house. Ultimately, Dave must slay the ghosts of the past, and decide whether to pursue new love with Sarah.

== Cast ==
- David Tennant – Dave Tiler
- Laura Fraser – Rita Morris
- Suranne Jones – Sarah, Rita's best friend
- Isla Blair – Beatty, Rita's adoptive mother
- Warren Brown – Matt, Sarah's partner
- Rupert Graves – Stuart, Lucy's biological father
- Mark Heap – Robin, Anna's husband
- Neve McIntosh – Anna, Rita's adoptive sister
- Natasha Watson – Lucy, Rita's 15-year-old daughter with Stuart
- Chris Hegarty – Paul, Rita and Dave's 11-year-old son
- Robert Dickson – Ewan, Rita and Dave's 9-year-old son
- Millie Innes – Evie, Rita and Dave's 6-year-old daughter
- Jenni Keenan Green – Michelle, Dave's first wife
- Sophie Kennedy Clark – Tanya, Dave's 18-year-old daughter by his first marriage to Michelle, who also has a three-year-old son
- Stephen McCole – Jimbo, Dave's friend with whom he plays football
- Gabriel Green McGillivray – Samuel, Tanya's 3-year-old son
- Charlotte Pyke – Francine, Stuart's wife
- Mariam Metreveli – Jemma, Stuart's daughter with Francine
- Sesili Metreveli – Alice, Stuart's daughter with Francine

== Production ==
As a BBC Scotland production, the series was mostly filmed on location in Glasgow. Some of the court scenes, including the exterior of the courthouse, were filmed at Paisley Sheriff Court and several of its staff were cast as extras. Some scenes were shot in Edinburgh at the Caledonian Hotel, Point Hotel, Calton Hill and in Princes Street Gardens.

== Critical reception ==
Single Father received mixed reviews from critics. Tim Dowling of The Guardian thought it "emotionally draining" and found Tennant "superb". However, John Preston writing in The Daily Telegraph thought it was "hopelessly contrived and lacking in either emotional veracity or plausibility".
