= The Sister (TV series) =

British psychological thriller 2020

- Genre: Thriller
- Written by: Neil Cross
- Directed by: Niall MacCormick
- Starring: Russell Tovey; Bertie Carvel; Amrita Acharia; Nina Toussaint-White; Amanda Root; Paul Bazely
- Country of origin: United Kingdom
- Original language: English
- No. of series: 1
- No. of episodes: 4

Production
- Running time: 47–76 minutes
- Production company: Euston Films

Original release
- Network: ITV
- Release: 26 October – 29 October 2020

The Sister is a British psychological thriller television series directed by Niall MacCormick, and adapted by Neil Cross from his novel Burial. The four-part series stars Russell Tovey, Bertie Carvel, Amrita Acharia and Nina Toussaint-White and was first broadcast on ITV from 26 to 29 October 2020. It was released as a Hulu original in 2021. The original title was Because the Night.

== Cast ==
- Russell Tovey as Nathan Redman
- Bertie Carvel as Robert "Bob" Morrow
- Amrita Acharia as Holly Fox
- Amanda Root as June Fox
- Paul Bazely as Graham Fox
- Simone Ashley as Elise Fox
- Nina Toussaint-White as DCI Jacki Hadley
- Ewan Bailey as DCI William Holloway

== Episodes ==
No. overall	No. in season	Title	Directed by	Written by	Original release date	Viewers (millions)
1	1	"Episode 1"	Gary Badger	Neil Cross	26 October 2020	7.01
Nathan has been hiding a dark secret but, one rainy evening, an unwelcome face from his past knocks on his door.
2	2	"Episode 2"	Niall MacCormick	Neil Cross	27 October 2020	5.48
Nathan realises his loved ones are at risk as secrets are exposed and a surprising link is revealed between past events and the present.
3	3	"Episode 3"	Niall MacCormick	Neil Cross	28 October 2020	5.32
The truth is revealed as Nathan and Bob go digging in the woods. And just when Nathan hopes his long nightmare might be over, Bob inflicts another twist of the knife.
4	4	"Episode 4"	Niall MacCormick	Neil Cross	29 October 2020	5.26
Bob reveals his true intentions, and Nathan fights back with everything he has. But how far is he prepared to go?

== Critical reception ==
The series received generally positive reviews from critics. Lucy Mangan of The Guardian described the drama as "a supernaturally-tinged dose of nail-bitery, doled out in suspenseful chunks". She praised the acting of lead Russell Tovey, whose portrayal of an "Everyman, suffering as an essentially good person trapped in a worsening hell not of his own making" made the viewing "absolutely agonising" and his depiction of guilt "genuinely moving". She considered the supernatural element "well-handled, even if I wish the connection between ghosts et al and our internal but very real horrors had been more fully explored rather than merely hinted at." Sean O'Grady of The Independent thought that, although the drama is filmed in "horror-movie cliché" of "dark, rainy nights in shadowy woods with ghoulish dialogue" that made it "ideal for near-Halloween viewing", the "strength of the cast and the very clever, subtle way" Neil Cross told the story saved it from being risible, and Cross had achieved the aim of making "the viewers sleep with the lights on".
