= Mind's Eye (radio series) =

Radio series

- Genre: Radio drama
- Running time: 30 minutes
- Country of origin: United Kingdom
- Language(s): English
- Starring: Dermot Crowley; Cathy Belton; Mark Lambert
- Written by: Gemma McMullen; Gerry Casey; John Murphy
- Directed by: Owen O'Callahan
- Recording studio: BBC studios in Belfast
- Original release: 2008
- No. of series: 1
- No. of episodes: 5
- Audio format: Stereophonic sound

Mind's Eye is a series of BBC radio dramas set in Dublin, concerning the effect of apparent paranormal phenomena on two psychotherapists, Lorcan Molloy and his daughter Aoife. Lorcan is mourning the recent death of his wife Jennifer, and also wishing for grandchildren from Aoife, who prefers her life as a single professional.

Lorcan and Aoife are presented with a series of cases which may represent spiritual possession, precognition, contact with angels, haunting and poltergeists. A freelance paranormal investigator and journalist, Fergus Rayner, who was a detective in the Dublin Garda before his obsession with the paranormal ended his career, inserts himself into each investigation, to the dismay of the Molloys. Not only does Fergus pester them with his ideas, he frequently writes newspaper articles containing wild accusations. Lorcan himself caused the end of Fergus' career by recommending him for psychiatric evaluation, after Fergus decided a particularly gruesome murder was actually a case of possession. Fergus claims that this was a "liberation" for him, but he may still harbor resentment towards Lorcan, who is beset with doubts about his ability to help people through his work, and indeed whether or not he ought take the paranormal more seriously, if only to help him understand his patients' state of mind. Aoife resolutely clings to the rational approach. A doctor at the local hospital, Brian Walsh, is involved with some of the cases, and is also interested in Aoife herself. Their relationship develops through the series, conflicting with Aoife's desire to devote herself to supporting her father. In the last episode, they take a trip to Paris together.

The series was conceived by Gemma McMullen and Gerry Casey, who wrote the first three episodes. The final two were written by John Murphy.

== Cast ==
- Lorcan Molloy - Dermot Crowley
- Aoife Molloy - Cathy Belton
- Fergus Rayner - Mark Lambert
- Brian Walsh - Richard Orr

== Episodes ==
Each episode starts with the same monologue by Lorcan:

My name is Lorcan Molloy. I am a psychotherapist. As a psychotherapist one needs to be aware. The less aware we are of our motives, feelings, thoughts, actions, perceptions, the more they control us, and the more we stay stuck in old patterns that don't work anymore. Relief from symptoms lies in discovering and incorporating into our constant everyday consciousness those things which are being masked. The key is awareness. After 30 years I know this as a fact. I know that if I were perfectly aware, I would have no symptoms. I would learn from my mistakes. I would not hurt the ones I love, nor be drawn to those who hurt me. I know all these facts, and yet...

- Virtuoso - a frail resident of an old peoples' home claims her hands are possessed by some other force. Despite severe rheumatoid arthritis, she is suddenly able to play the piano with virtuosity.
- Faith - A man claims an angel appeared to prevent him from having an accident in his car. Fergus claims the man has a doppelganger.
- Whispers - A young boy may be under attack by a poltergeist.
- Prophet - A murderer released after serving his sentence suddenly claims to be able to foresee crimes.
- Lodgers - An apparently thriving boarding house in Dublin has no visible guests, but plenty of activity.

== Notes ==
The name "Aoife" is pronounced "Eefa" and is an Irish name corresponding to the English "Eva".
