= Anya Chalotra =

English actress (born 1995/1996)

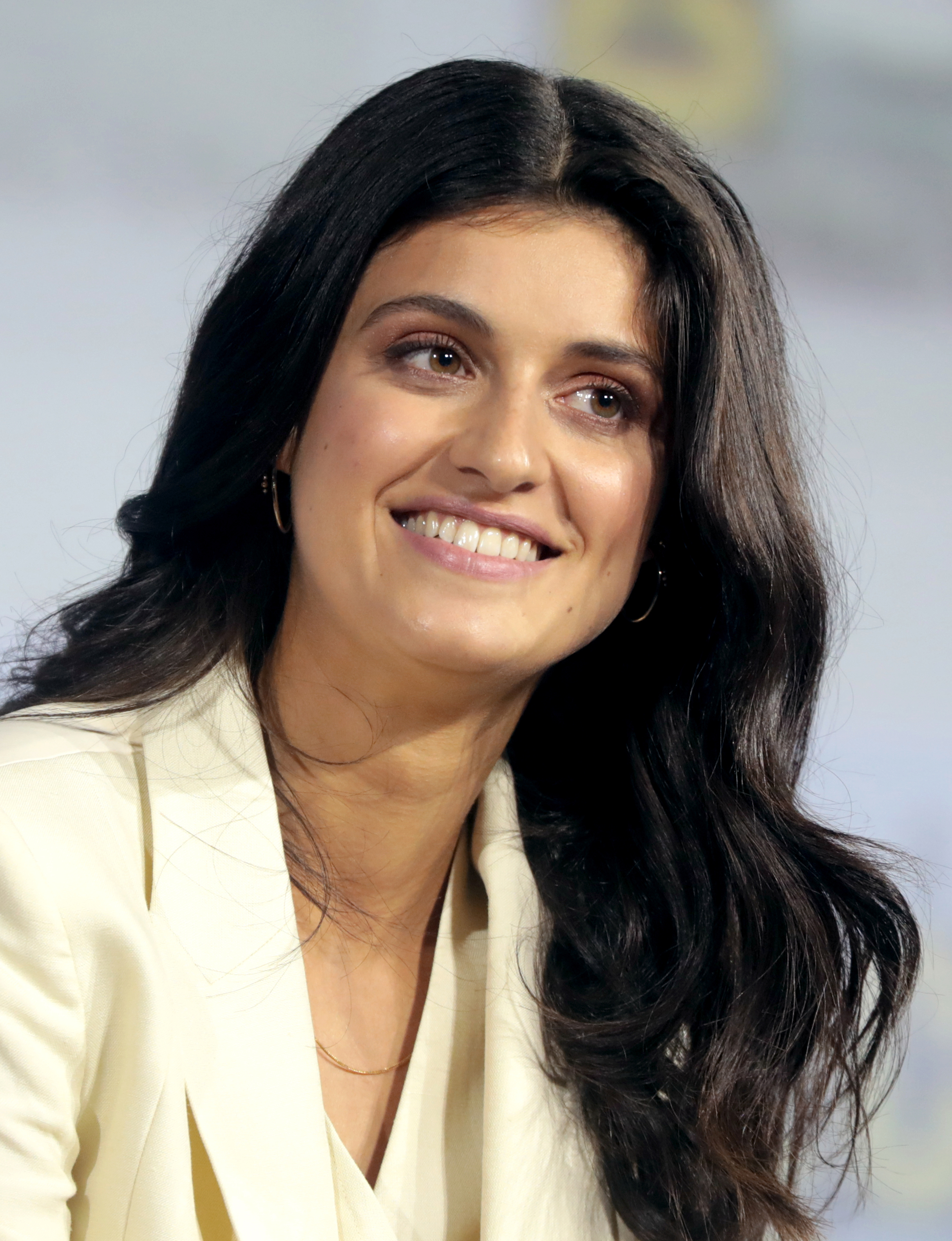
- Chalotra in 2019
- Born: 1995 or 1996 (age 30–31); Wolverhampton, England
- Education: Guildhall School of Music and Drama
- Occupation: Actress
- Years active: 2017–present

Anya Chalotra (born 1995 or 1996) is an English actress known for her performances across stage and screen. Following her professional debut in Much Ado About Nothing (2017) at Shakespeare's Globe, she made her screen debut in the BBC One drama series Wanderlust (2018) and The ABC Murders (2018). She gained wider recognition for her starring role as Yennefer in the Netflix fantasy series The Witcher (2019–present).

== Early life and education ==
Anya Chalotra was born in Wolverhampton, to an Indian father and an English mother. She was raised in Lower Penn, South Staffordshire, alongside an older sister and a younger brother. Chalotra attended St Dominic's Grammar School in Brewood, where she first began performing in school productions and youth theatre groups. To pursue a career in acting, she moved to London to complete a foundation course at the London Academy of Music and Dramatic Art (LAMDA), followed by a three-year degree at the Guildhall School of Music and Drama.

== Career ==
=== Theatre ===
Chalotra began her career on the stage and went on to star in several critically acclaimed productions. In 2017, she made her professional debut as Hero in Matthew Dunster's Much Ado About Nothing at Shakespeare's Globe. She subsequently earned acclaim for her performance as Jyoti in Nadia Fall's production of April De Angelis' The Village at Stratford East in 2018, and for her supporting role as Sabine in Jonathan Kent's production of David Hare’s Peter Gynt at the National Theatre in 2019. The Guardian's Michael Billington described her as "compelling," noting her transition from a "strong-willed adolescent to fiery militant."

She earned further critical acclaim for her performance as Zula when she returned to the stage in 2023 to lead Conor McPherson's stage adaptation of Cold War, directed by Rupert Goold at the Almeida Theatre, a role she performed through early 2024. The Times lauded her "extraordinary élan and ease," as the impassioned, impulsive Zula, noting she appeared "barely to be acting at all," while The telegraph described her as “a bewitching revelation"

=== Film and television ===
Chalotra made her screen debut in 2018 as Jennifer Ashman in the BBC comedy-drama series Wanderlust. That same year, she appeared as Lily Marbury in the BBC adaptation of Agatha Christie's The ABC Murders. Shortly after, it was announced that she had been cast as Yennefer in the Netflix fantasy drama The Witcher. Her performance was widely praised and established the role as her international breakthrough. Following a seven-year tenure in the role, Chalotra completed filming the series in late 2025; the fifth and final season is scheduled for release in late 2026. During the production of the series, she also starred in the Sky Arts short film No Masks (2020), which was based on real-life testimonies of frontline workers during the COVID-19 pandemic.

In 2023, it was announced that Chalotra would star in the satirical thriller Two Neighbors, which premiered at the Edinburgh International Film Festival in 2025. In February 2026, it was announced that she had joined the cast of the second Luther feature film for Netflix, alongside Idris Elba.

== Acting credits ==
=== Film ===
Year	Title	Role	Notes	Ref.
2025	The Witcher: Sirens of the Deep	Yennefer	Voice	
2025	Two Neighbors	Becky		
TBA	Luther 3 †	TBA	Post-production	

=== Television ===
Year	Title	Role	Notes	Ref.
2018	Wanderlust	Jennifer Ashman	Miniseries; 5 episodes	
2018	The ABC Murders	Lily Marbury	Miniseries; 3 episodes	
2019	Sherwood	Robin Loxley	Voice; 10 episodes	
2019–present	The Witcher	Yennefer	Main role	
2020	No Masks	Dr. Anuja	TV Short film	
2024	Twilight of the Gods	Sif	Voice; 3 episodes	
2024–present	Creature Commandos	Circe	Voice; 3 episodes	

=== Theatre ===
Year	Title	Role	Theater	Ref.
2017	Much Ado About Nothing	Hero	Shakespeare's Globe	
2018	The Village	Jyoti	Theatre Royal Stratford East	
2019	Peter Gynt	Sabine	Royal National Theatre	
2021	Maryland	Mary 2	Theatre Royal Stratford East	
2023–2024	Cold War	Zula	Almeida Theatre	

=== Audio ===
Year	Title	Role
2019	Sense and Sensibility	Marianne
2020–2021	The Cipher	Sabrina
2023	Moriarty: The Silent Order	Agatha

== Awards and nominations ==
Year	Award	Category	Work	Result	Ref
2017	The Stage Awards	Best Actress in a Play	Much Ado About Nothing, Shakespeare's Globe	Nominated	
2018	UK / West End BroadwayWorld Awards	Best Actress in a Play	The Village, Theatre Royal Stratford East	Nominated	
2020	IMDb STARmeter Awards	Breakout Star	The Witcher	Won	
