= Sam Miller =

English film director

- Born: 28 September 1962 (age 63); Saxmundham, England
- Occupations: Television and film director Film producer Actor

Sam Miller (born 28 September 1962) is a British television director and former actor from Saxmundham, England. As an actor, he is known for his role as Sgt. John Maitland in the ITV police procedural drama The Bill from 1990 to 1993. As a director, he has worked on the BBC television dramas Cardiac Arrest, This Life and Luther. He works with London-based production company Mustard Film Company. He is the father of the actor and footballer William Miller, who played Oliver Twist in the 2007 television adaptation.

Miller has received three Emmy nominations for Outstanding Directing for a Miniseries, Movie or a Dramatic Special, one in 2012 for Luther and two in 2021 for I May Destroy You for the episodes "Eyes Eyes Eyes Eyes" and "Ego Death" (with Michaela Coel).

== Filmography ==
=== Film ===
Director

- Among Giants (1998)
- Elephant Juice (1998) (Also co-producer)
- No Good Deed (2014)

Narrator

- Krakatoa: The Last Days (2006)

=== Television ===
Director

| Year | Title | Director | Executive Producer | Notes |
|---|---|---|---|---|
| 1995 | Cardiac Arrest | Yes | No | 4 episodes |
| 1996 | This Life | Yes | No | 3 episodes |
| 1997 | King Leek | Yes | No | TV pilot |
| 2003–2009 | Spooks | Yes | No | 6 episodes |
| 2004 | Murder City | Yes | No | 2 episodes |
| 2006 | Tripping Over | Yes | No | 3 episodes |
| 2010 | Single Father | Yes | No | Miniseries |
| 2010–2015 | Luther | Yes | No | 10 episodes |
| 2012 | Good Cop | Yes | No | 2 episodes |
| 2015 | Fortitude | Yes | No | 2 episodes (Also co-producer) |
| 2015 | American Crime | Yes | No | Episode 7 |
| 2015 | Flesh and Bone | Yes | No | 1 episode |
| 2016 | Luke Cage | Yes | No | Episode 6 |
| 2017 | Guerrilla | Yes | No | 2 episodes (Also associate producer) |
| 2017 | Rellik | Yes | Yes | 3 episodes |
| 2018 | Daredevil | Yes | No | Episode 39 |
| 2019 | Just Roll with It | Yes | No | episode 6 |
| 2020 | Snowpiercer | Yes | No | 2 episodes |
| 2020 | I May Destroy You | Yes | Yes | 12 episodes |
| 2022 | Surface | Yes | Yes | 4 episodes |
| 2023 | Black Mirror | Yes | No | Episode "Loch Henry" |
| 2024 | A Gentleman in Moscow | Yes | Yes | 5 episodes |
| 2026 | Steal | Yes | Yes | 3 episodes |

TV movies

- King Girl (1996)
- Quite Ugly One Morning (2004)
- The Quatermass Experiment (2005)
- Krakatoa - The Last Days (2006)
- Danny Boy (2021)

Acting roles

| Year | Title | Role |
|---|---|---|
| 1988 | The Great Escape II: The Untold Story | Air Reconnaissance Officer |
| 1990 | Murder East - Murder West | Christian |
| 1990-1993 | The Bill | Sgt. John Maitland |
| 1992 | Fergie & Andrew: Behind the Palace Doors | Prince Andrew, Duke of York |
