= Warren Brown (actor) =

British actor (born 1978)

- Born: Warren Martin Brown; 11 May 1978 (age 48); Warrington, Cheshire, England
- Occupation: Actor
- Years active: 1994–present

Warren Martin Brown (born 11 May 1978) is an English actor, widely known for his roles as Donny Maguire in Shameless and Andy Holt in Hollyoaks, DS Justin Ripley in the BBC crime drama Luther and as Sergeant Thomas "Mac" McAllister in the British-American action television series Strike Back, starting with Strike Back: Retribution.

== Early life ==
Warren Brown was born in Warrington, England. He studied at the University of Salford.

== Career ==
After appearing in two episodes of the television series Shameless, Warren played the evil Andy Holt in Channel 4's Hollyoaks. Brown was nominated for a number of awards for his performance in the show including Best Villain, Best Actor, Most Spectacular Scene and Best Exit at the 2006 British Soap Awards. Brown's character Holt met his demise in February 2006.

Brown won a role in the short-lived ITV show Jane Hall in the summer of 2006. This was followed in March 2007 by his role as Tommo in ITV's Mobile. Also in 2007 he starred as Chris in one episode of Casualty. In September 2007 he starred in the second series of BBC Three's Grownups, playing barman Alex Salade and has played the part since. In the 2009 Comic Relief Special of Two Pints of Lager and a Packet of Crisps, which was a crossover between Grownups, Two Pints and Coming of Age, he played Alex again.

In 2008, Brown performed the voiceover for the film trailer of Gomez: A True Story, based on the life of boxer Michael Gomez and starring Emmerdale's Kelvin Fletcher. In October 2008, Brown played the role of Marky in E4's zombie drama Dead Set. In November 2008, he appeared in Casualty, but not playing the same character as he did in 2007. In 2009 Brown appeared in the three part BBC Iraq war drama Occupation, alongside James Nesbitt and Stephen Graham Brown has appeared in two episodes of The Bill playing Jake Clegg, who was a part of the operation of trafficking young girls illegally. These episodes were titled "The Forgotten Child".

From May 2010, he appeared as the regular character of DS Justin Ripley in the BBC drama Luther, a role that he reprised in June 2011 in the second series of Luther. Brown left the series in 2013. Brown appears in the deadmau5 music video for the song "I Remember", also starring Stephen Graham, Aston Kelly (Graham's brother), Greg Walsh and ex-Coronation Street actress Emma Edmondson. In October 2010, Brown appeared as Matt in the BBC drama Single Father. In February 2012, he played one of the main characters in the BBC drama series Inside Men. He appeared as a member of Bane's Mercenary Security in The Dark Knight Rises, the third instalment of Christopher Nolan's Batman trilogy.

First broadcast in August 2012, Brown starred as PC John-Paul Rocksavage in the four-part BBC police drama Good Cop. From 2017, he plays Sergeant Thomas "Mac" McAllister in Retribution, the British-American action television series, in the sixth series and second revamp of Strike Back opposite Daniel MacPherson. The eighth series finished filming and aired in February 2020.

Brown has appeared in many audio dramas for the company Big Finish Productions, the most notable of which including a recurring role in their UNIT series, a spin-off based around the military organisation that regularly appeared in Doctor Who, since 2016, and playing Keith Burrow in Big Finish's original eight-part thriller Transference. In 2020, Brown would make his debut appearance in the television series, in the episode "Praxeus", albeit as a different character, former police officer Jake Willis, who was looking for his husband.

In 2023, Brown featured as a main cast member in BBC One drama Ten Pound Poms. For his portrayal of Terry Roberts, he was awarded the Best Actor trophy in the Fiction portion of the Golden Nymph Awards at the Monte-Carlo Television Festival.

== Kickboxing ==
Brown has competed at world-level in Muay Thai (Thai kickboxing) and is a two-time World Champion.

== Filmography ==
=== Film ===
Year	Title	Role	Notes
2008	Gomez: A True Story	Voice over	
2011	Boxed	Steve	Short film
2011	Up There	Slab Boy Joey	
2012	The Dark Knight Rises	Mercenary Security #1	
2012	Byzantium	Wee Gareth	
2012	Borrowed Time	Nigel Petite	
2014	Get Some	Hunter	Short film
2015	Captain Webb	Captain Matthew Webb	
2015	Kicking Off	Little Wigsy	
2017	Cargo	Kevin	
2017	The Hatton Garden Job	Senior Officer Trotter	
2018	Genesis	Secretary Jordan Bruce Ainsney	
2018	Blood, Sweat and Terrors	Hunter	Segment: "Get Some"
2018	Three Sacks Full of Hats	Mick	Short film
2019	Transference	Keith	
2019	This Is the Winter	Vince	Short film
TBA	The Chelsea Cowboy	Priddle	Post-production

=== Television ===
Year	Title	Role	Notes
2004–2005	Shameless	Donny Maguire	2 episodes: "We're Getting Married" and "Welcome to the Family"
2005–2006	Hollyoaks	Andy Holt	20 episodes
2006	Jane Hall	Policeman 2	2 episodes
2007	Casualty	Chris Ryder	Episode: "Life's Too Short"
2007	Life on Mars	David Trotman	Episode #2.4. Uncredited role
2007	Mobile	Tiny Tommo	Mini-series; 3 episodes: "The Engineer", "The Soldier" and "The Boss"
2007–2009	Grownups	Alex	Series 2 and 3; 12 episodes
2008	Coming Up	Campbell	Episode: "And Kill Them"
2008	Spooks: Code 9	Luke Blackwell	Episode #1.4
2008	Dead Set	Marky	Mini-series; 5 episodes
2008	Casualty	John Fullman	Episode: "The Line of Fire"
2008	The Bill	Jake Clegg	2 episodes: "Forgotten Child: Parts 1 and 2"
2009	Two Pints of Lager and a Packet of Crisps	Alex	Episode: "Comic Relief Special: When Janet Met Michelle"
2009	Occupation	Lee Hibbs	Mini-series; 3 episodes
2009	Criminal Justice	PO Paul Gibby	Series 2; 3 episodes
2010	Single Father	Matt	Mini-series; 4 episodes
2010	Accused	David Wade	Episode: "Alison's Story"
2010–2015	Luther	DS Justin Ripley	Series 1–4; 16 episodes Nominated—Crime Thriller Award for Best Supporting Actor on Television; Nominated—Critics' Choice Television Award for Best Supporting Actor in a Movie/Miniseries
2011	Walk Like a Panther	Ricky Rickson	Episode #1.1
2011	Moving On	Frank	Episode: "Donor"
2011	Merry Widows	Vicar, Matthew	Unknown episodes
2012	Inside Men	Marcus	Mini-series; 4 episodes
2012	Good Cop	John Paul Rocksavage	Mini-series; 4 episodes
2012	Homefront	Joe Mancetta	6 episodes
2013	Agatha Christie's Marple	Arthur Jackson	Episode: "A Caribbean Mystery"
2013	By Any Means	Jack Quinn	Mini-series; 6 episodes
2015	Playhouse Presents	Mr. Grimme	Episode: "King for a Term"
2015–2017	X Company	Neil Mackay	Series 1–3; 28 episodes
2016	Comedy Playhouse	Martin	Episode: "Broken Biscuits"
2016	Moving On	Liam	Episode: "Burden"
2017	Liar	Tom Bailey	6 episodes
2017–2020	Strike Back	Sgt. Thomas 'Mac' McAllister	Series 6–8; 27 episodes
2020	Doctor Who	Jake Willis	Episode: "Praxeus"
2021	GamesMaster	Himself	Episode 2
2022	Desperate Measures	Patrick	Main cast, 4 episodes
2022	Trigger Point	Karl Maguire	5 episodes
2022–2024	The Responder	Raymond Mullen	Series 1 and 2; 10 episodes
2023–2025	Ten Pound Poms	Terry Roberts	Main cast, series 1 and 2; 12 episodes
2024	The Gathering	Paul	Main cast, 6 episodes
2025–2026	A Taste for Murder	DCI Joe Mottram	Lead role, 6 episodes
2026	MobLand	Finch	Recurring role
2026	Time	Albie	Series 3, Episode 1

=== Video games ===
Year	Title	Role	Notes
2020	Watch Dogs: Legion	Dalton Wolfe	Voice
