= Neil Cross =

British novelist and scriptwriter

- Born: Neil Claude Gadd; 9 February 1969 (age 57); Bristol, England
- Education: University of Leeds
- Occupations: Novelist, crime writer and television scriptwriter
- Children: 2
- Writing career
- Notable works: Luther; Spooks; Doctor Who; Hard Sun
- Website: www.neil-cross.com

Neil Claude Cross (né Gadd; born 9 February 1969) is a British novelist and scriptwriter, best known as the creator of the drama series Luther and Hard Sun. He is also the showrunner for the TV adaptation of The Mosquito Coast, which began airing in 2021.

== Life and career ==
Neil Claude Gadd was born in Bristol on 9 February 1969, to unhappily married parents, Alan and Edna (née Noyes) Gadd. He was the youngest of their four children. His mother ran away when he was five, returned two years later and took him to Edinburgh with Derek Cross, a White South African who was to become his stepfather and whose surname he would adopt.

Neil Cross graduated from the University of Leeds in 1994 with a degree in English and Theology, and received his master's degree in English in the year following. His initial career was solely as a novelist, beginning with Mr In-Between, which was published in 1998 (and adapted into a film in 2001).

His novel, Always the Sun, which was long-listed for the Booker Prize, Burial and Captured; and has written a memoir Heartland, which was short-listed for the PEN/Ackerley Prize for literary autobiography of excellence. His most recent novel, Luther: The Calling, was published in 2011. In 2019 it was announced he was adapting Burial into what became the ITV series The Sister.

In 2011, Cross was included in Variety magazine's list of "10 Screenwriters to Watch".

== Filmography ==
=== Television ===
Production	Episodes	Network
Spooks	The Criminal (2006); The Virus: Part 1 (2007); The Virus: Part 2 (2007); Infiltration (2007); Isolated (2007); New Allegiances (2008); Split Loyalties (2008); Nuclear Strike (2008)	BBC One
The Fixer	Episode 4 (2008)	ITV
Luther	Series creator, all episodes (2010–2019)	BBC One
Whistle and I'll Come to You	TV Movie (2010)	BBC Two
Doctor Who	"The Rings of Akhaten" (2013); "Hide" (2013)	BBC One
Crossbones	Series co-creator, 5 episodes (2014)	NBC
Hard Sun	Series creator, all episodes (2018)	BBC One
The Sister	Series creator, all episodes (2020)	ITV
The Mosquito Coast	Series co-creator, 3 episodes (2021–2023)	Apple TV+
The Iris Affair	Series creator (2025)	Sky Atlantic

=== Film ===
Production	Role	Distributor
Mr In-Between (2001)	Adapted by Peter Waddington, from Cross' novel	Verve Pictures
Mama. (2013)	Co-written with Andy Muschietti & Barbara Muschietti	Universal Pictures
Pacific Rim (2013)	(uncredited script doctor)	Warner Bros. Pictures
Luther: The Fallen Sun (2023)	Writer and producer (continuation of the series)	Netflix
Luther 3	Writer and producer	Netflix

== Bibliography ==
- Mr In-Between (1998), initially to be entitled Adrenochrome
- Christendom (1999)
- Holloway Falls (2003)
- Always the Sun (2004)
- Heartland (a memoir) (2006)
- Natural History (2007)
- Burial (2009)
- Captured (2010)
- Luther: The Calling (2011)

== Awards and nominations ==
=== Luther Series 1 ===
- Winner, Luther, Mystery Writers of America Edgar Award for Best Teleplay in 2010 (Episode 1).
- Nominee, Luther, Mystery Writers of America Edgar Award for Best Teleplay in 2010 (Episode 4).
- Nominee, Luther, NAACP Image Award, Outstanding Television Movie, Mini-Series or Dramatic Special

=== Luther Series 2 ===
- Nominee, Neil Cross, Primetime Emmy Award 2012, Outstanding Writing for a Miniseries, Movie or a Dramatic Special
- Nominee, Luther, Primetime Emmy Award 2012, Outstanding Miniseries or Movie
- Winner, Luther, Creative Diversity Network, Radio Times Drama award 2011
- Winner, Luther, Royal Television Society, Best Drama Series 2011
- Nominee, Luther, Broadcast Television Journalists Association Critics' Choice Television Awards 2012, Best Movie/Miniseries

=== Luther Series 3 ===
- Nominee, Neil Cross, Primetime Emmy Award 2014, Outstanding Writing for a Miniseries, Movie or a Dramatic Special
- Nominee, Luther, Primetime Emmy Award 2013, Outstanding Miniseries

=== Books ===
- Winner, Luther: The Calling, Ngaio Marsh Award, 2012
- Longlisted, Luther: The Calling, Theakston's Old Peculier Crime Novel of the Year Award 2012
- Finalist, Captured, Ngaio Marsh Award, New Zealand, 2011
- Finalist, Burial, Ngaio Marsh Award,(NZ) 2010
- Shortlisted, Heartland, PEN/Ackerley Prize for literary autobiography 2006
- Long-listed, Always the Sun, Man Booker Prize 2004
