= Dermot Crowley =

Irish stage, film and television actor (born 1947)

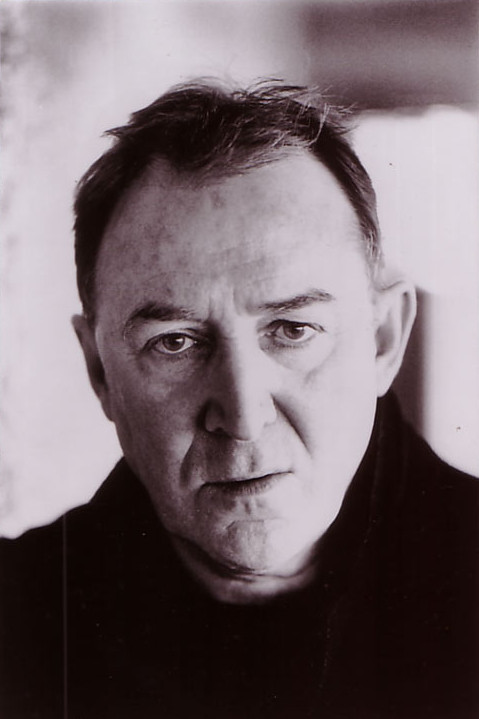
- Born: 19 March 1947 (age 79); Cork, Ireland
- Occupation: Actor
- Years active: 1976–present

Dermot Crowley (born 19 March 1947) is an Irish stage, film and television actor.

== Life and career ==
=== Theatre ===
Crowley's stage work has included a leading role in an Olivier Award winning production of Conor McPherson's The Weir, which played in the United Kingdom, Ireland and the United States in the late 1990s. His first television role was playing George Bernard Shaw in the UK TV series Victorian Scandals in 1976.

In 2011, he appeared in The Cripple of Inishmaan with the Druid Theatre Company at the Kirk Douglas Theatre in Los Angeles. He won the L.A. Drama Critics Circle Award for Featured Performance.

=== Film and television ===
Crowley played General Crix Madine in Return of the Jedi. He played Sgt. François Duval in Son of the Pink Panther. Crowley went on to appear in Call Red, Father Ted as Father Liam Deliverance, Dangerfield, Jonathan Creek, A Touch of Frost, Holby City, The Bill, Midsomer Murders and Luther, among others. In 1987 Crowley auditioned for the role of the Seventh Doctor in Doctor Who. Footage of his screen test was included on the special features of the DVD release of Time and the Rani.

Crowley also appeared as the crooked Mr. Simpson in The Adventure of the Clapham Cook, which was the very first episode of Agatha Christie's Poirot in 1989. He read the voice of Molloy on the Naxos 2003 Audiobook of Samuel Beckett's novel Molloy.

He appeared in the feature film The Best Offer in 2013. In 2012 he starred in a new series Hunted for BBC One and HBO. He played George Ballard, an MI6 Spy Chief in episodes 4 and 5.

Crowley often appears on BBC radio in drama such as Mind's Eye. In 2013, he played Pat Whyte in Father Figure. In 2017, he played the role of Lazar Kaganovich in the political satire, The Death of Stalin.

== Filmography ==
=== Film ===
Year	Title	Role	Notes
1976	The Fruits of Philosophy	George Bernard Shaw	
1982	Giro City	Flynne	
1983	Return of the Jedi	General Crix Madine	Also known as Star Wars Episode VI: Return of the Jedi
1983	Octopussy	Lieutenant Kamp	
1983	Teamwork	Patrick Molloy	
1985	The Doctor and the Devils	Mr. Webb	
1987	Little Dorrit	Mr. Simpson	
1990	Wilt	Braintree	
1990	The March	Roy Cox	
1993	Son of the Pink Panther	Sergeant François Duval	
1994	Staggered	Dr. Barnet	
2000	The Legend of Bagger Vance	Dougal McDermott	
2002	Before You Go	Father Cunningham	
2006	Babel	Barth	
2008	Gud, lukt och henne		
2009	Holy Water	Father Grogan	
2013	The Best Offer	Lambert	
2014	Mrs. Brown's Boys D'Movie	P.R. Irwin	
2015	The Lady in the Van	Priest	
2015	National Theatre Live: Everyman	Death	
2017	The Foreigner	Hugh McGrath	
2017	The Death of Stalin	Lazar Kaganovich	
2018	Black '47	Judge Bolton	
2022	The Wonder	Sir Otway	
2023	Luther: The Fallen Sun	DSU Martin Schenk	
2023	Baltimore	Donal	
TBA	Luther 3	DSU Martin Schenk	Filming

=== Television ===
Year	Title	Role	Notes
1986	Call Me Mister	Detective Sergeant McBride	10 episodes
1989	Agatha Christie's Poirot	Arthur Simpson	1 episode
1991–2007	The Bill	Various roles	4 episodes
1996	The Sculptress	Father Julian	4 episodes
1996	Father Ted	Father Liam Deliverance	Episode: Rock a Hula Ted
1998	Jonathan Creek	Norman Stangerson	Episode: "Time Waits for Norman"
1998	Falling for a Dancer	Neeley Scollard	Television film
2002	Ultimate Force	Jack Cullen	Episode: The Killing Of A One-Eyed Bookie
2005	Bleak House	Mr. Vholes	6 episodes
2006	Midsomer Murders	Peter Hatchard	Episode: Down Among The Dead Men
2007	Foyle's War	Henry Townsend	Episode: Casualties of War
2008	New Tricks	Derek Bennett	Episode: Final Curtain
2009	Margaret	Airey Neave	Television film
2010–2019	Luther	DSU Martin Schenk	18 episodes
2012	Raw	Dan Kelly	6 episodes
2013	Father Figure	Pat Whyte	6 episodes
2024	The Woman in the Wall	James Coyle	4 episodes
