= Murder on the Home Front =

- Genre: Crime drama; Police procedural
- Written by: David Kane
- Directed by: Geoffrey Sax
- Starring: Patrick Kennedy; Tamzin Merchant; Emerald Fennell; James Fleet; David Sturzaker; Iain McKee; Ryan Gage
- Composer: Robert Lane
- Country of origin: United Kingdom
- Original language: English
- No. of series: 1
- No. of episodes: 2

Production
- Executive producers: Gareth Neame; Sally Woodward Gentle
- Producer: Christopher Hall
- Cinematography: David Higgs
- Editor: Paul Knight
- Running time: 60 minutes
- Production company: Carnival Film & Television

Original release
- Network: ITV
- Release: 9 May – 16 May 2013

Murder on the Home Front is a two-part British television crime drama, written by David Kane and directed by Geoffrey Sax, that first broadcast on ITV on 9 May 2013. The series, which stars Patrick Kennedy and Tamzin Merchant in the principal roles, follows Dr. Lennox Collins (Kennedy), a home office pathologist new to murder cases who teams up with his receptionist, Molly Cooper (Merchant) to investigate a serial killer operating at the height of the Blitz. The series' script was based upon the memoirs of Molly Lefebure, secretary to the former Second World War Home Office pathologist Keith Simpson.

The series aired as a single presentation on PBS in the United States on 16 February 2014. Executive producer Sally Woodward Gentle said of the production, "With Geoffrey Sax directing Davy Kane’s witty and fast paced script, we hope to depict London in the Blitz as a city living life on the edge." The series was released on DVD via Universal Pictures on 29 July 2013.

== Cast ==
- Patrick Kennedy as Dr. Lennox Collins
- Tamzin Merchant as Molly Cooper
- Emerald Fennell as Issy Quennell
- James Fleet as Professor Henry Stephens
- David Sturzaker as DI Freddie Wilkins
- Iain McKee as DS Brady
- Ryan Gage as Danny Hastings
- John Heffernan as Wilfred Zeigler
- John Bowe as Ronald Terry
- Richard Bremmer as Charlie Maxton
- Susie Blake as Miss Jenkins
- Ria Zmitrowicz as Wilma Grey
- Siobhan Hayes as Jenny Hatton
- Patrick Knowles as Rosanski

== Episodes ==
No.	Title	Directed by	Written by	Original release date	Viewers (millions)
1	"Part 1"	Geoffrey Sax	David Kane	9 May 2013	5.04
When several young women are found murdered, DI Freddy Wilkins believes the obvious suspect is loner Wilfred Ziegler, but Home Office pathologist Lennox Collins and his secretary Molly Cooper have their doubts and employ ground-breaking forensic techniques to ensure the right man is brought to justice.
2	"Part 2"	Geoffrey Sax	David Kane	16 May 2013	4.30
As the story of the “Nazi Strangler” is leaked to the newspapers, Lennox and Molly face a battle not only with their bosses but also with the police when they try to save a seemingly innocent man from the gallows. As more victims of the Nazi Strangler turn up, they put their own lives at risk in a quest for the truth.

== Reception ==
The series broadcast to strong critical acclaim, with Sarah Rainey of The Telegraph writing; "A decent, gritty portrayal of Second World War Britain - one that doesn’t pretend life on the Home Front was a cosy tea party of do-it-yourselfers and make-do-and-menders - [which] has been a long time coming."

Alison Graham of the Radio Times commented; "Imagine a cross between Foyle's War and Silent Witness and you have Murder on the Home Front. It’s one of those brown, wartime dramas where lights are dim, ITMA’s on the radio and everyone is terribly plucky. A strange mix of the jaunty and the gruesome, though there’s a loving attention to period detail; even the bomb-sites look hand-crafted."

Keith Watson of the Metro was however slightly more scathing, writing; "The acting is spot on, but the tone is a touch wobbly. At times a cartoonish skit on 1940s stereotypes – think The Fast Show’s Cholmondeley Warner [sic] – Murder on the Home Front wants it all ways, throwing in the kind of grisly gore that’s customary in modern serial killer cases, but feels at odds with jaunty banter that’s saucily tongue-in-cheek."
