= The Last Weekend (TV series) =

- Genre: Psychological thriller
- Written by: Mick Ford, based on The Last Weekend by Blake Morrison
- Directed by: Jon East
- Starring: Rupert Penry-Jones; Shaun Evans; Genevieve O'Reilly; Claire Keelan; Alexander Karim
- Composer: Rob Lane
- Country of origin: United Kingdom
- Original language: English
- No. of series: 1
- No. of episodes: 3

Production
- Executive producer: Sally Woodward Gentle
- Producer: Christopher Hall
- Running time: 3x45 min
- Production company: Carnival Films

Original release
- Network: ITV
- Release: 19 August – 2 September 2012

The Last Weekend is a three-part psychological thriller television series produced by Carnival Films in 2012 for ITV, based on the Blake Morrison novel of the same name. Set over a long weekend in East Anglia, the story centres on a rival friendship that spirals out of control as personal revelations force each character to re-assess their views of one another.

== Plot ==
Ian (Shaun Evans) and Em (Claire Keelan) receive a surprise invitation from an old friend. Ollie (Rupert Penry-Jones) invites the couple to spend a weekend in the Suffolk countryside with him and Daisy (Genevieve O'Reilly). The couples expect an idyllic holiday, but the competitive edge to the men's relationship soon rises to the surface, with irreversible consequences.

== Cast and crew ==
- Rupert Penry-Jones as Ollie
- Shaun Evans as Ian
- Genevieve O'Reilly as Daisy
- Claire Keelan as Em
- Hugh Mitchell as Archie

Mick Ford adapted the novel for television and Jon East directed the series. Sally Woodward Gentle was the executive producer for Carnival Films, while Christopher Hall served as series producer.

== Reception ==
The Last Weekend was met with positive reviews, and received an average of four to five stars from all publications rating the serial.

Time Out's Gabriel Tate called it a "sophisticated deconstruction of friendship and the modern class system."

Stuart Jeffries of The Guardian praised the first episode, saying "fine writing, trenchant class analysis …. there was so much to enjoy in The Last Weekend. I don't know if Blake Morrison's novel is any good, but if it's half as accomplished as Mick Ford's adaptation then last year's Booker prize winner must be stripped of the award. Ford's writing is surely the best in TV drama since Steven Moffat's Sherlock."

The Independent's Archie Bland wrote "no one is to be entirely trusted, [the] gun is definitely going to go off, and I'm looking forward to finding out who fires it."

Euan Ferguson of The Observer commented, "The passive-aggressive golf game between 'old chums' Ollie and Ian had every twitch of the tension of an Ayckbourn endgame without the leavening humour, and this was a good thing: gripping, and I realise I am in terrible danger of saying that we've again got the finest TV in the world."

Leading up to the final episode Inside Soap wrote "one thing we've enjoyed most about this drama is the sense of creeping dread that has built up in its short run." The Don't Miss column described Shaun Evans' performance as "brilliant".

In its Pick of the Day TV Times gave The Last Weekend five stars, calling it "brilliant". The publication anticipated a "thrilling yet unsettling end to what has been a great drama, with a disturbing yet subtle performance from Shaun Evans as Ian."

== Awards ==
Award	Result	Category	Recipient
RTS Programme Awards 2011/2012	Nominated	Original Title Music	Rob Lane
Music & Sound Awards 2013	Nominated	Original Composition (TV Programme)	The Last Weekend
