= Alexander Wilson (English writer) =

English writer, spy and MI6 officer (1893–1963)

- in uniform
- Born: Alexander Joseph Patrick Wilson; 24 October 1893; Dover, Kent, England
- Died: 4 April 1963 (aged 69); Ealing, London, England
- Other names: Geoffrey Spencer, Gregory Wilson, Michael Chesney
- Occupations: Writer, teacher, spy, hospital porter
- Employer(s): Islamia College, MI6
- Known for: Polygamy, fabrication
- Spouse: Gladys Kellaway (m. 1916) Dorothy Wick (m. 1927) Alison McKelvie (m. 1941) Elizabeth Hill (m. 1955)
- Children: 7, including Dennis B. Wilson
- Relatives: Ruth Wilson (granddaughter)

Alexander Joseph Patrick "Alec" Wilson (24 October 1893 – 4 April 1963) was an English writer, spy, MI6 officer, and polygamist. He wrote under the names Alexander Wilson, Geoffrey Spencer, Gregory Wilson, and Michael Chesney.

After his death, his family discovered that he had been a serial polygamist, who had lied to many people. As of 2018, documents that could shed light on his activities remain classified as "sensitive" by the Foreign and Commonwealth Office, under section 3(4) of the Public Records Act 1958.

The effect of his deceptions on his wives and descendants were dramatised in the 2018 BBC miniseries Mrs Wilson, in which his granddaughter, actress Ruth Wilson, portrayed her grandmother Alison (Wilson's third wife).

== Early life and education ==
Wilson was born in Dover, the eldest son and second of four children of Alexander Wilson (1864–1919), from Winchester, Hampshire, and Annie Marie (née O'Toole; 1865–1936), from Carlow, County Carlow, Leinster, who were married in 1886. Wilson's paternal grandfather, Hugh Wilson (1839–1870), was born in Winchester, Hampshire, where he married Elizabeth Bracken (b. 1842) in 1863. (Hugh helped found the Army Hospital Corps and participated in the Second Opium War (1860) in China, consequently receiving the China War Medal. Hugh died at the age of 30–31 in 1870, and was buried in the grounds of Netley Hospital, Hampshire.) The couple had only one child, Alexander Wilson, Alec's father.

Wilson's father had a 40-year career in the British Army, progressing from a 15-year-old bugler to a Lieutenant Colonel Quartermaster in the Royal Army Medical Corps by the time he died in 1919. (The elder Wilson served throughout the Boer War, consequently receiving the Queen's South Africa and King's South Africa medals. He was mentioned in dispatches for managing and supplying hospital ships and trains from the Western Front during World War I. In 1918 he was responsible for all medical supplies to the British Army in Europe. He was buried on the Isle of Sheppey, Kent.)

In his childhood Alec Wilson's family followed his father to Mauritius, Singapore, Hong Kong and Ceylon. Alec was educated at St. Joseph's College, Hong Kong, a prominent private school, and St Boniface's Catholic College in Plymouth, where he played amateur football.

== First marriage and World War I ==
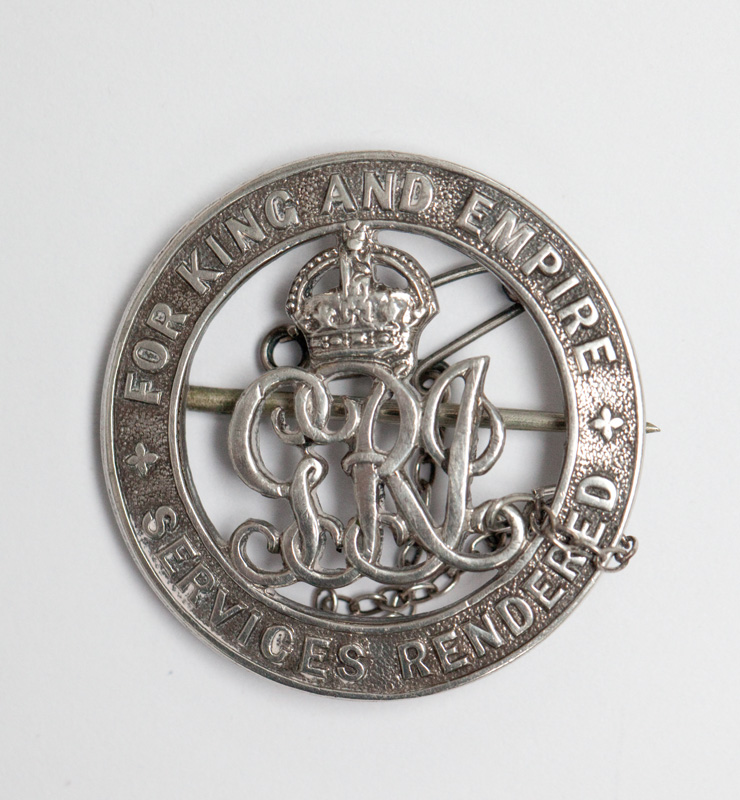
Silver War Badge, for honourable discharge due to wounds or sickness in World War I, and intended to be worn on civilian clothes.

Wilson enlisted in the Royal Naval Air Service in 1914, at the start of World War I, according to a reference in a War Office document which also indicated that he had crashed his aircraft. In 1915 he was commissioned as a second lieutenant in the Royal Army Service Corps, escorting motor transports and supplies to France. He sustained disabling injuries to his knee and shrapnel wounds to the left side of his body which led to his being invalided out of the Army in 1917, and for which he was awarded the Silver War Badge.

In March 1916 Alec married his first wife, Gladys Ellen Kellaway (1896–1981), in Lyndhurst, Hampshire. He tried to reenlist in 1917, but due to his medical record was unsuccessful. He joined the merchant navy in 1919, serving as a purser – first on a Scottish shipping line, then on a requisitioned German liner, SS Prinzessin, which sailed from London to Vancouver via South Africa, China and Japan. While working on the Prinzessin, he was arrested and prosecuted, apparently for theft, in Vancouver in September 1919, a day after his father's death. He received a six-month sentence of hard labour at Oakalla Prison near Burnaby, British Columbia.

From 1920 to 1925 Alec and Gladys managed a touring repertory theatre company and lived in Thame, eastern Oxfordshire. In his romantic comic novel The Magnificent Hobo (1935), a touring theatrical company moves from town to town.

== Second marriage and academic appointment ==
In 1925 Wilson answered an advertisement in The Times for a position as Professor of English Literature at Islamia College at the University of Punjab in Lahore (now part of Pakistan). Wilson was interviewed and appointed by the college's principal, Abdullah Yusuf Ali, an author and educator who translated the Quran. Biographer Tim Crook discovered that Wilson had fabricated the credentials which led to his appointment. Wilson provided a portrait of Abdullah in his second novel, The Devil's Cocktail (1928), as principal of the fictional Sheranwalla College in Lahore.

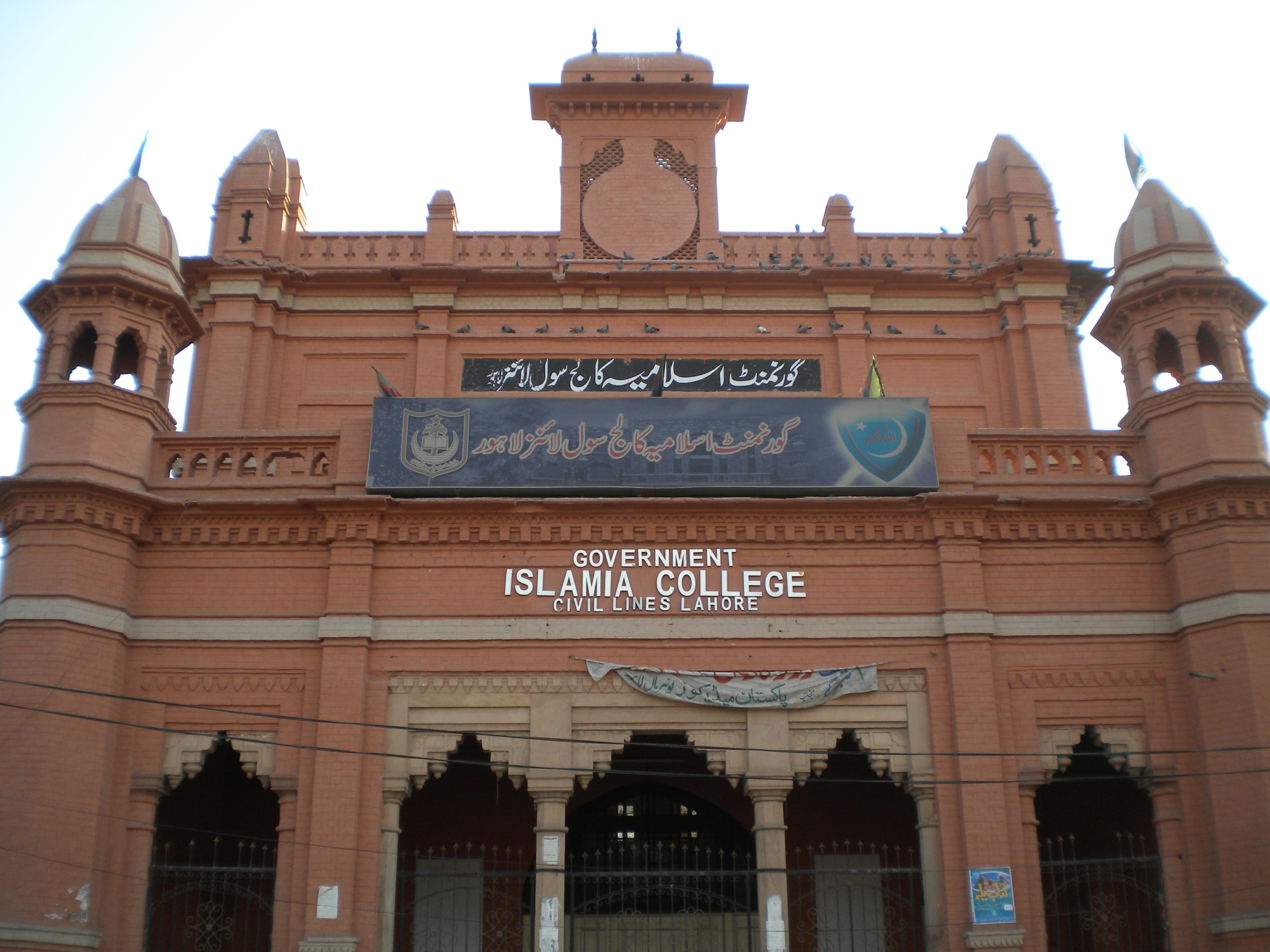
Islamia College, where Alec Wilson taught from 1925 and served as principal from 1928 to 1931.

Leaving behind Gladys and his children, Adrian Wilson (b. 1917), Dennis B. Wilson (b. 1921), and Daphne Wilson (b. 1922), Wilson left for British India in October 1925.

En route to British India, Wilson met actress Dorothy Phyllis Wick (1893–1965) on the SS City of Nagpur, bound from Liverpool to Karachi. Wick was on a tour in the place of Dame Sybil Thorndike.

Wilson married Dorothy in Lahore some time in 1928, while he was still married to Gladys, his first wife. Although a public wedding ceremony apparently took place at the Sacred Heart Cathedral, Lahore, no certificate has been found to confirm that a formal marriage occurred. For a while the Wilsons made their home at 11 Mason Road in Lahore.

Wilson travelled around the North-West Frontier and learned Urdu and Persian. He set up and led Islamia College's University Training Corps and was appointed an honorary Major in the British Indian Army Reserve. At the time the all-Muslim college's students were a minority in Lahore. Sons of Waziristan Chiefs and farmers from the North West Frontier received training here for the British Indian Army.

Wilson succeeded Yusuf Ali as ninth principal of Islamia College in November 1927 and resigned in March 1931. In his 1939 application to join the Emergency War Officers' Reserve, Wilson claimed that he had been the editor of a daily newspaper in Lahore between 1931 and 1934. He also stated that he'd spent time in Arabia, Ceylon, and Palestine.

Crook suggests that Wilson's role at Islamia College may have been a cover for work conducted on behalf of British intelligence agencies as a recruiter and informant. Crook maintains that Yusuf Ali had connections with intelligence work. The Soviet Comintern was active in subversion and insurrection, and the British authorities were combating an increasing number of terrorist plots and assassinations between 1928 and 1932. Tensions were raised by hunger strikes and the Lahore Conspiracy Case, during which pro-independence activists died and others were sentenced to death.

== Writing career ==
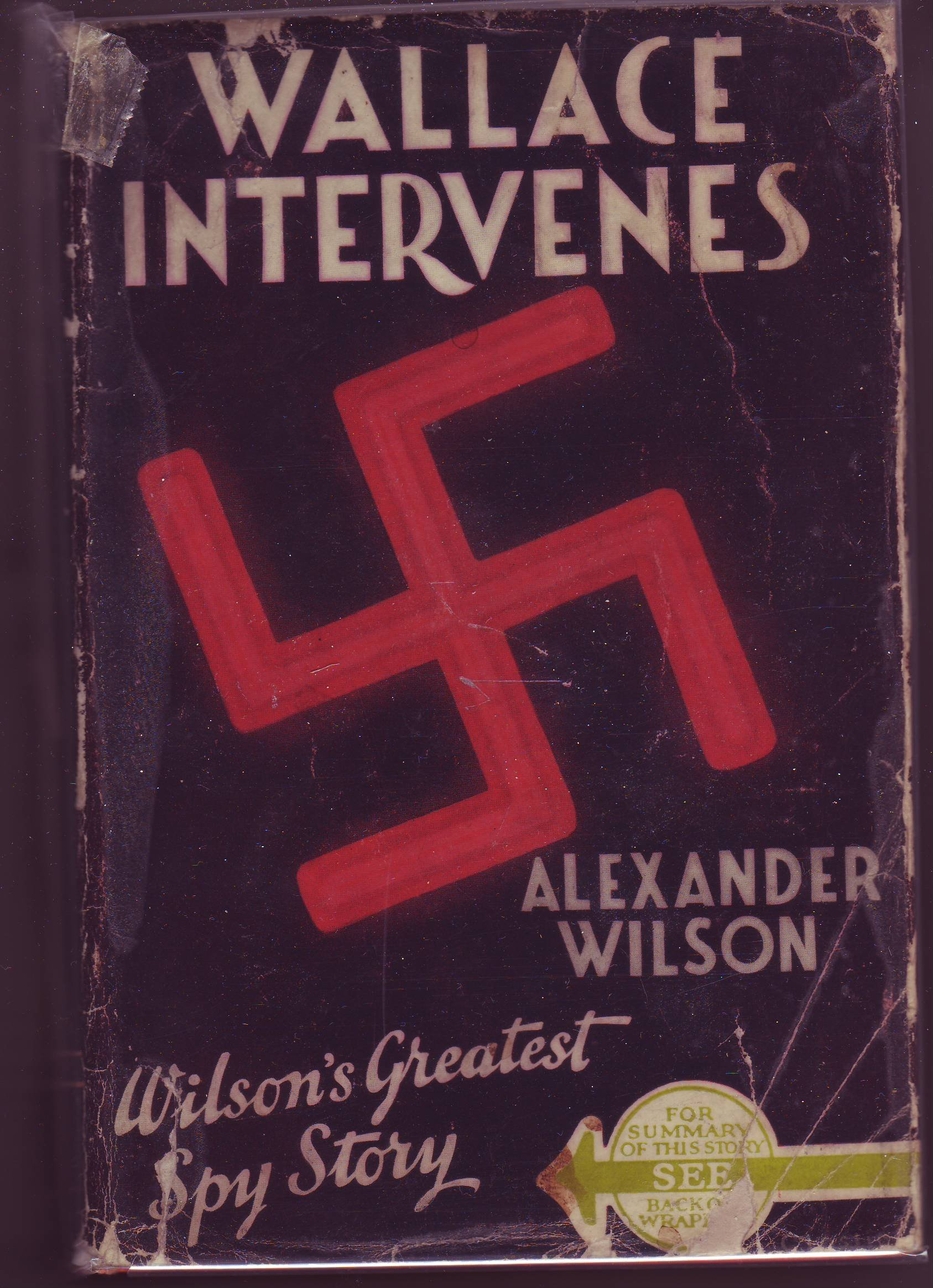
The cover of the spy novel Wallace Intervenes by Alexander Wilson, published in 1939

While in Lahore, Wilson began writing spy novels and received his first contract for The Mystery of Tunnel 51 from Longmans, Green & Co. in 1927. Tunnel 51 and eight subsequent novels featured the struggle of Sir Leonard Wallace, his intelligence officers and his agents against terrorism and subversion in the British Empire, the influence of the Soviet Union, the tentacles of global organised crime, and Nazi Germany. The Wallace character appears to be closely based on the first "C" (chief, or director) of MI6, Mansfield Smith-Cumming. There is no documentary evidence that Wilson had any connections at this time with MI6 (the Secret Intelligence Service), MI5 (the Security Service), IPI (the Indian Political Intelligence in London), or the Indian Intelligence Bureau in Delhi. But his Wallace shared with Smith-Cumming a wooden limb, grey eyes, and "a wife whose forename began with 'M' ".

In addition, Wilson published two crime thrillers, Murder Mansion (1929) and The Death of Dr. Whitelaw (1930).

From 1933 Wilson's publisher was Herbert Jenkins, and his novels included titles in the Sir Leonard Wallace series and others in the crime, romance, comedy and thriller genres. Apart from books that he wrote under his own name, he also published under three pseudonyms. In 1933 Confessions of a Scoundrel was published under the pseudonym "Geoffrey Spencer" — the surname used by Smith-Cumming when he rented MI6's headquarters at 2 Whitehall Court. As "Gregory Wilson" Alec wrote The Factory Mystery and The Boxing Mystery for The Modern Publishing Company in 1938. Between 1938 and 1939, as "Michael Chesney", he wrote a trilogy of spy novels of imperial adventure that featured Colonel Geoffrey Callaghan, Chief of Military Intelligence as central character: Callaghan of Intelligence, "Steel" Callaghan, and Callaghan Meets His Fate. What appear to be his last two novels, Chronicles of the Secret Service and Double Masquerade, were published by Herbert Jenkins in 1940.

Wilson wrote "forceful, exciting, thrilling, vibrant, vivid, intriguing, daring" stories, according to reviewers in The Telegraph, The Observer, The Scotsman and The Times Literary Supplement. In January 1940 The Observer's reviewer, Maurice Richardson, said Wallace Intervenes "is another spy story featuring Hitler in person, if not name. This time he is kidnapped, put in a trunk, and successfully impersonated by Sir Leonard Wallace, Chief of the Intelligence Service. This comes at the end of an exciting love-duel in which one of our younger agents has to seduce a beautiful Austrian Baroness, who fortunately turns out to be on our side all the time".

In 2015–16 Allison & Busby re-published nine of Wilson's Wallace of the Secret Service novels.

In total, Wilson wrote and published 24 novels and edited three academic books, aside from four unpublished manuscripts.

== Third marriage and World War II intelligence work ==
A pregnant Dorothy Wilson returned to England in 1933, where her son, Michael Chesney, was born in Paddington. The birth certificate listed the father as Alexander Douglas Chesney Wilson, a Major with the Middlesex Regiment. Crook's research in the Middlesex Regiment's archives did not find a Major by that name. And the only photograph that Michael had of Alec Wilson showed him wearing the uniform of an Officer in one of the Punjab Regiments of the British Indian Army.

Alec arrived in London in 1934, but left Dorothy and their baby son and returned to Gladys, his first and still-legitimate wife and his family, who now lived in Southampton. He stayed with Gladys for only 18 months.

After a falling out over finances with Gladys' Aunt Ruth, Alec moved back to London in 1935 to live with Dorothy and Michael. He told Gladys that he would find a place for them all to live. Instead, he and Dorothy lived in Little Venice. Michael later suspected that his father had been involved in intelligence activities as an agent in the 1920s and 1930s. He remembered seeing his father meet Joachim von Ribbentrop at the German Embassy in Carlton House Terrace in London in the spring of 1938, and recalled other meetings with men with whom his father spoke fluent German. A letter written by Dorothy in 1936 mentions that Alec intended to travel to Spain during that country's civil war.

Bankruptcy forced Alec to move with Dorothy and Michael to Yorkshire in 1940. In 1941 Alec finally left Dorothy, departing in uniform on a train after kissing his son Michael goodbye for the last time.

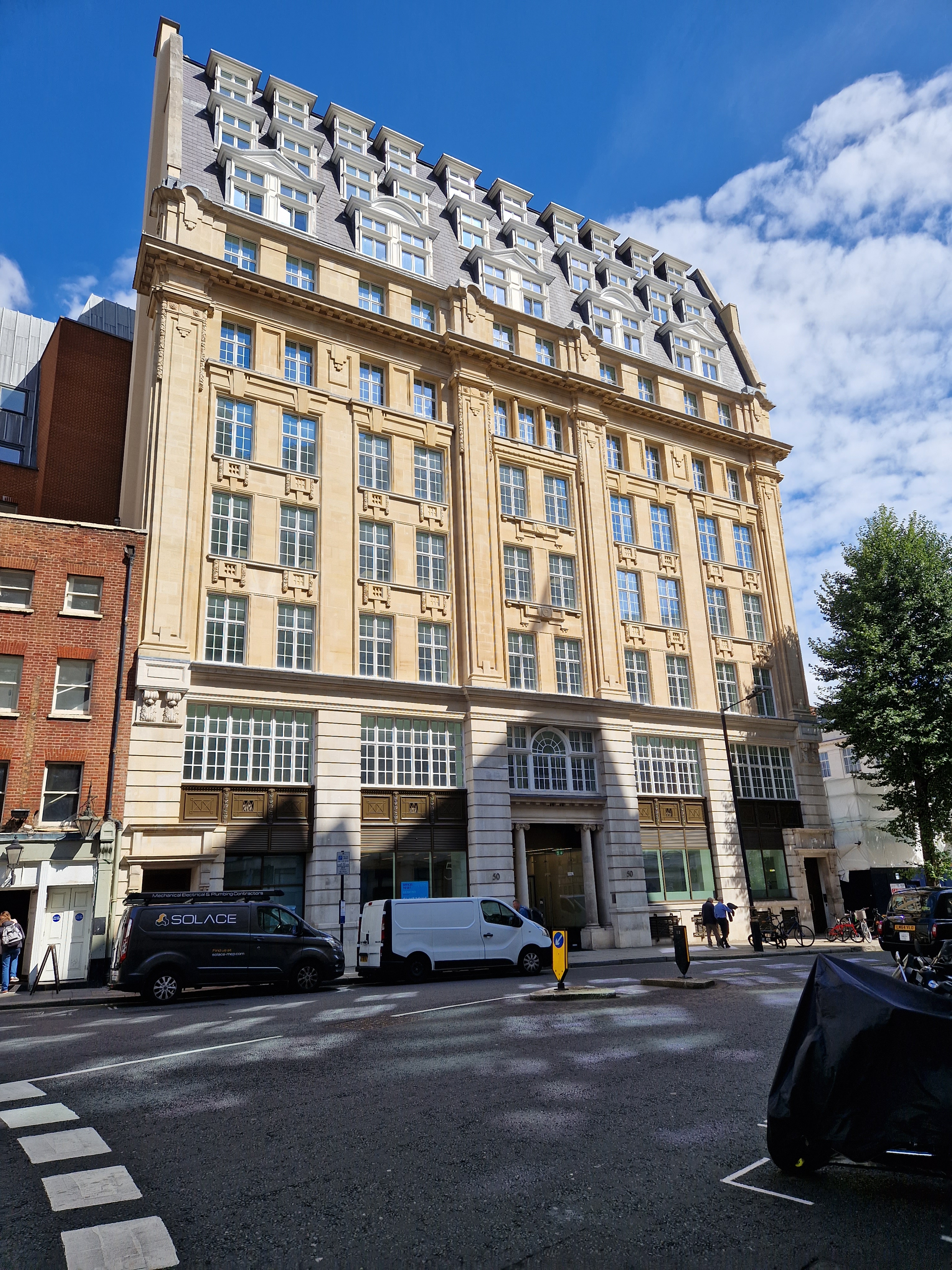
Broadway Buildings, Westminster, WW II headquarters of the SIS.

By 1940 Wilson was working as a translator for Secret Intelligence Service (which became known at the time as MI6) in Section X, which conducted communications surveillance of embassies. There he met Alison Mary McKelvie (1920–2005), a secretary for the Service. When her apartment became uninhabitable during a German bombing raid on London, she moved in with him. In 1941 Wilson married Alison, who became his third wife. Although he had shown her a divorce certificate, it was later found to have been falsified. Wilson was almost 30 years older than Alison. They had two sons: Gordon Wilson (b. 1942) and Nigel Wilson (b. 1944).

In 1942 a maternal uncle told Dorothy's son, Michael, aged nine, that Alec had been killed in the Battle of El Alamein. But Wilson was living with Alison in London at the time. While a Lieutenant Colonel Wilson, who had served with the Punjab Regiment, is listed as killed at El Alamein by artillery fire, his photograph and personal history is not that of Alec Wilson.

Foreign Office files released to The National Archives at Kew in May 2013 confirmed that a translator of Hindustani, Persian and Arabic had joined the SIS in October 1939 and had been forced to resign in October 1942. Although the translator's name is redacted, it is likely to be Alexander Wilson, since the details disclosed match those included in the first part of a memoir, written by Alison Wilson for her two sons, and quoted in Crook's 2010 biography of Wilson.

The Foreign Office documents included a 1943 file marked "The Case of the Egyptian Ambassador", an MI5 investigation into alleged espionage by ambassador Hassan Nachat Pasha and his staff in London from the beginning of the war. The documents reveal that the SIS/MI6 translator, presumably Wilson, was accused of embellishing translations of intercepted telephone calls to and from the Embassy. The agent investigating Wilson's translations, Alex Kellar, was later found to have been working for the KGB mole at MI5, Anthony Blunt. A report noted that the translator had faked a burglary at his flat and had been in serious trouble with the police.

In one of the 1943 documents, MI5's Director General, Brigadier Sir David Petrie, states that the fact Wilson was no longer in the service was "...perhaps some small compensation for the amount of trouble to which his inventive mind has put us all. A fabricator, such as this man was, is a great public danger". Then-Chief of the Secret Intelligence Service, Sir Stewart Menzies, wrote: "I do not think it at all likely that we shall again have the bad luck to strike a man who combines a blameless record, first-rate linguistic abilities, remarkable gifts as a writer of fiction, and no sense of responsibility in using them!"

Crook believes that Wilson could have been the victim of an attempt by Blunt to discredit MI6. Wilson may have faked the burglary to hide from Alison that he'd sold her jewellery to buy antibiotics to treat her post-natal infections. Alison Wilson reported in her memoirs that the police had not investigated the alleged burglary, nor did she recall that Wilson had been in trouble with the police as a result. Crook proposes that the British government took steps to prevent Wilson from "obtaining any kind of official or responsible employment" ever again, ending his publishing career and plunging him and his families into poverty.

In 1942 Wilson told Alison that MI6 had decided he should go into the field as an agent. He said his subsequent misadventures, including being declared bankrupt, though never discharged, and being jailed for petty theft, were part of the cover he had to adopt for operational reasons.

In January 1944 The Times of London carried a notice declaring Alex Wilson bankrupt. At this time, he lived in Hendon.

After his dismissal, Wilson worked in cinema management until 1948, when he was prosecuted at Marylebone Police Court and received a three-month jail sentence for embezzling funds from a Hampstead cinema. It was his second appearance before the court, having been prosecuted and fined in 1944 for allegedly posing as an Indian Army colonel and "wearing false decorations". Wilson said that the Hampstead sentence was to enable him to monitor fascist groups in Brixton prison.

== Fourth marriage and post-World War II work ==
By the mid-1950s Wilson was working as a hospital porter in a casualty unit in West London, when he met and, in 1955, married a nurse, Elizabeth Hill (1921–2010), with whom he had a son, Douglas Wilson, that same year. In later years Wilson continued to pretend to work at the Foreign Office while actually working as a clerk at a wallpaper factory. After Elizabeth moved to Scotland with Douglas in 1957, Wilson again lived with Alison.

On 4 April 1963, aged 69, Wilson died of a heart attack in Ealing, and was buried in Milton Cemetery, Portsmouth. His tombstone notes that he was "also known as Alexander Douglas Gordon Chesney Wilson", describes him as an "author and patriot", and quotes Shakespeare's Othello: "He loved not wisely but too well". The monument is feet away from the grave of fellow MI6 agent Commander Lionel Crabb.

== Uncovering Wilson's parallel lives ==
Wilson never divorced any of his wives, "instead keeping the women ignorant of each other's existence as he juggled his many separate lives and parallel families." One way he avoided detection was "by changing his middle name on marriage certificates".

Her husband's multiple marriages came to Alison Wilson's notice only after Alec's death in 1963, when she discovered from his papers that his first wife was Gladys. Alison telephoned Gladys to inform her of Alec's death and of his other family. Dennis Wilson said that they thought the call had come from Alec's landlady. Alison asked Gladys to pretend to be Alec's relative at his funeral, so as not to upset Alison's sons, Gordon and Nigel. As a result, neither Gordon, Nigel, nor Daphne knew about one another or about their father's bigamy. Alison never found out that her husband was also married to Dorothy and Elizabeth.

Alison Wilson wrote a two-part memoir in an attempt to make sense of her husband's deceptions, lamenting that "he had not only died, he had evaporated into nothing." Her grandchildren were allowed to read her memoir only shortly before her death.

All of Alec's wives kept his secrets, maintaining the image of him as a heroic figure for the sake of his children.

In 2005, Wilson and Dorothy's son, Michael (then aged 73), asked his son's friend, journalist and academic Tim Crook, to investigate his father's life. An actor and poet, Michael had changed his name by deed poll to Mike Shannon. Crook spent six years on the project, publishing the results in a 2010 book entitled The Secret Lives of a Secret Agent: the Mysterious Life and Times of Alexander Wilson.

Crook uncovered Wilson's marriage to Gladys, whose son Dennis told him about the funeral arrangements, and so revealed the marriage to Alison. Alison's sons told him that they had been contacted by Elizabeth's son, Douglas Ansdell, and so had discovered Alec's fourth wife.

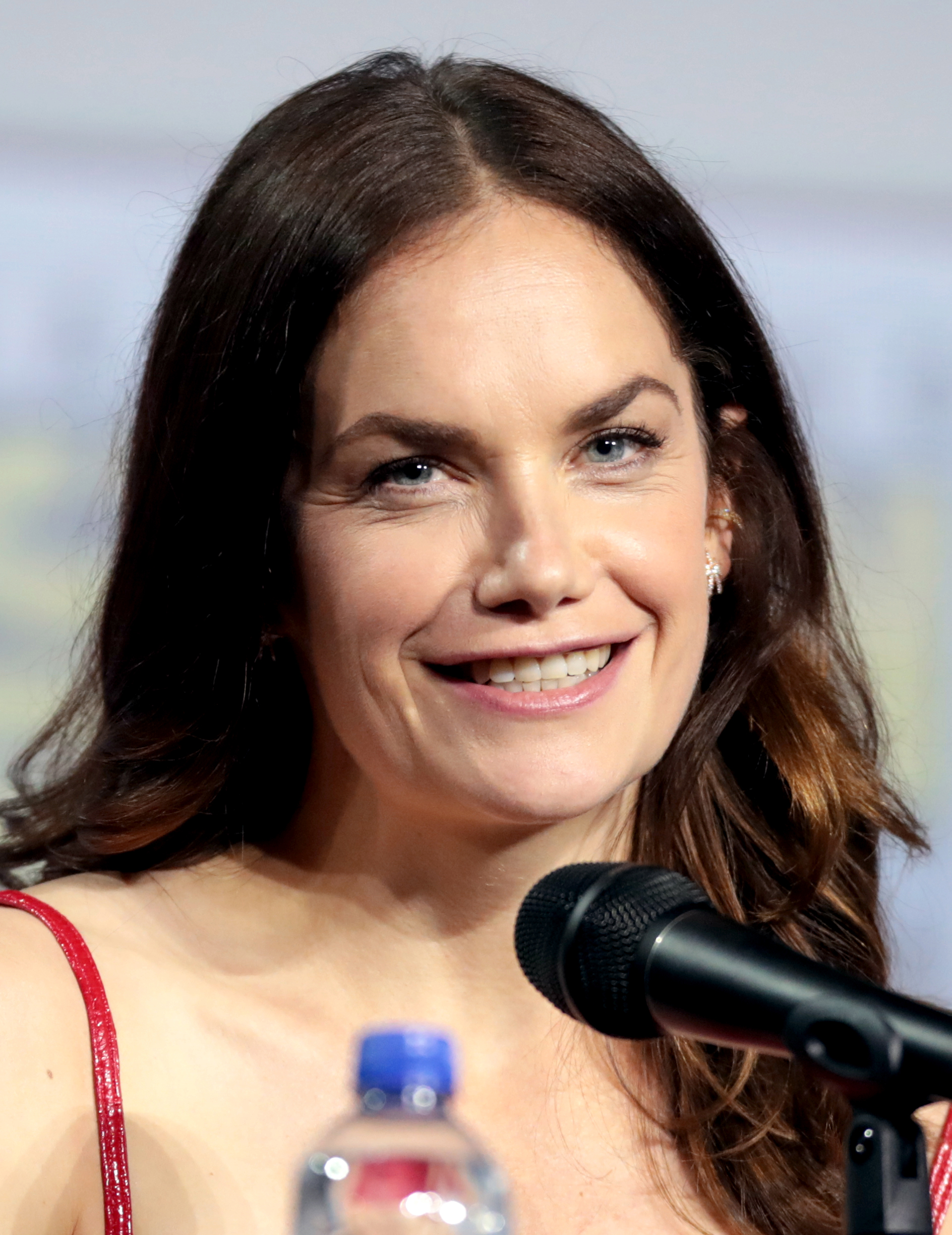
Actress Ruth Wilson, granddaughter of Alec and Alison Wilson, in 2019

Crook concludes that Wilson's spy novels reveal details of intelligence work so precise as to indicate first-hand experience. Wilson may have been encouraged to write them by the intelligence services to portray themselves as all-powerful, Crook says. And the lack of evidence about Wilson's life may be due to an intelligence operation meant to expunge all traces of him from public records, Crook told a reporter.

All of Alec Wilson's surviving offspring with their families, 28 persons in all, met for the first time in December 2007 in Hampshire. Each of Alec's children wore a badge indicating who their parents were. Since that first meeting the extended family has tried to meet regularly.

Actress Ruth Wilson, daughter of Nigel, is one of Alec's grandchildren, and discovered that the children of Mike Shannon were also professionals working in playwriting, filmmaking and drama education. Ruth's brother, Sam Wilson, a senior BBC journalist, wrote an article in The Times in 2010 that explored the impact of Alexander Wilson's complicated private life on his various families.

== Mrs Wilson ==
Crook's book on Wilson and his numerous articles inspired the production of the BBC's 2018 three-part drama Mrs Wilson, starring Iain Glen as Alec Wilson. Ruth Wilson, daughter of Nigel Wilson, portrayed her own grandmother, Alison Wilson, and was also an executive producer. Mrs Wilson was nominated in three categories (mini-series, leading actress, supporting actress) at the 2019 BAFTA awards.

== Descendants ==
Wilson had seven children with his four wives in sequence as in the table below:

Wives and children of Alec Wilson
Spouse	Children		
Gladys Kellaway (m. 1916, d. 1991)	Adrian Wilson (1917–1998)	Dennis B. Wilson (1921–2022)	Daphne Wilson (b. 1922)
Dorothy Wick (m. ca. 1927, d. 1965)	Michael Wilson, who later changed his surname to Shannon (1933–2010)		
Alison McKelvie (m. 1941, d. 2005)	Gordon Wilson (b. 1942)	Nigel Wilson (b. 1944), m. Mary Metson. Parents of four children including Ruth Wilson	
Elizabeth Hill (m. 1955, d. 2010)	Douglas Wilson, who later changed his surname to Ansdell (b. 1955)		

== Books by Alexander Wilson ==
Wilson wrote and published 24 novels:

- 1928: The Mystery of Tunnel 51. London: Longmans, Green and Co.
- 1928: The Devil's Cocktail. Longmans, Green and Co.
- 1929: Murder Mansion. Longmans, Green and Co.
- 1930: The Death of Dr. Whitelaw. Longmans, Green and Co.
- 1933: The Confessions of a Scoundrel (as "Geoffrey Spencer".) T. Werner Laurie.
- 1933: The Crimson Dacoit. Herbert Jenkins.
- 1933: Wallace of the Secret Service. Herbert Jenkins.
- 1934: Get Wallace! Herbert Jenkins.
- 1934: The Sentimental Crook. Herbert Jenkins.
- 1935: The Magnificent Hobo. Herbert Jenkins.
- 1936: His Excellency, Governor Wallace. Herbert Jenkins.
- 1937: Microbes of Power. Herbert Jenkins.
- 1937: Mr Justice. Herbert Jenkins.
- 1937: Double Events. Herbert Jenkins.
- 1938: Wallace At Bay. Herbert Jenkins.
- 1938: The Factory Mystery (as "Gregory Wilson".) Modern Publishing Company.
- 1938: The Boxing Mystery (as "Gregory Wilson".) Modern Publishing Company.
- 1938: Callaghan of Intelligence (as "Michael Chesney"). Herbert Jenkins.
- 1939: Wallace Intervenes. Herbert Jenkins.
- 1939: Scapegoats for Murder. Herbert Jenkins.
- 1939: "Steel" Callaghan (as "Michael Chesney".) Herbert Jenkins.
- 1939: Callaghan Meets His Fate (as "Michael Chesney".) Herbert Jenkins.
- 1940: Chronicles of the Secret Service. Herbert Jenkins.
- 1940: Double Masquerade. Herbert Jenkins.

Wilson also edited three academic books:

- 1926: Selected English Prose Stories for Indian Students (co-edited with Mohammad Din). Shamsher Singh & Co.
- 1928: Four Periods of Essays. Rai Sahib M Gulab Singh & Sons.
- 1930: Selected English Essays. Uttar Chand Kapur & Sons.

A further four of his manuscripts remain unpublished:

- Murder in Duplicate (as AJP Wilson).
- The Englishman from Texas.
- Out of the Land of Egypt (ca. 1958, as Col. Alan C. Wilson).
- Combined Operations (ca. 1961, title assigned by Dennis Wilson).
