= Christopher Hall (producer) =

English television producer (born 1957)

- Born: Christopher John Hall; 30 March 1957 (age 69); London, England
- Occupations: Television producer; former assistant director
- Spouse: Jane Studd (m. 1988)
- Children: 2
- Parent(s): Leslie Caron; Sir Peter Hall
- Relatives: Jennifer Caron Hall (sister); Edward Hall (half-brother); Rebecca Hall (half-sister)

Christopher John Hall (born 30 March 1957) is an English television producer. He has produced dramas primarily for the BBC, ITV, Sky and Channel 4 networks, and worked for major British production companies, including Kudos, Carnival Films, Hat Trick Productions, World Productions, Tiger Aspect Productions and Sid Gentle Films.

== Personal life ==
Hall was born in London, the son of French actress and dancer Leslie Caron and English stage, opera and film director Sir Peter Hall. He has a sister, Jennifer Caron Hall, and four half-siblings, including director Edward Hall and actress, writer/director Rebecca Hall. Hall was educated at Eaton House Belgravia, Bedales School and St Catharine's College, Cambridge.

He is married to Jane Studd, with whom he has two sons, Freddie Hall, director and assistant director, and Ben Hall, actor.

== Career ==
Hall with his mother Leslie Caron and Maurice Chevalier on the set of Gigi (1958)

Hall started his career as an assistant director on feature films with David Hare (Strapless in 1989 and Paris by Night), Ken Russell (The Lair of the White Worm in 1988), and as a floor manager or assistant director on TV shows such as Inspector Morse and Porterhouse Blue. Working his way up through the grades, he became a line producer and then a fully fledged producer. In 1996, he produced The Final Passage, directed by his father Peter Hall, which won BAFTA and RTS awards for Cinematography.

One of his best-known productions is The Lost World (2001) starring Peter Falk, Bob Hoskins, James Fox, and Matthew Rhys. The production was noted for stripping the Conan Doyle text of racial overtones. He also produced the television film Archangel (2005) for the BBC, starring Daniel Craig, which was adapted from a 1998 Robert Harris thriller by Dick Clement and Ian La Frenais and filmed on location in Moscow and Latvia.

In 2011, for Hat Trick and ITV, Hall produced Case Sensitive starring Olivia Williams. Hound of the Baskervilles (2002), which starred Richard E. Grant, John Nettles, Ian Hart, Richard Roxburgh and Geraldine James and received a BAFTA nomination for best sound, was another of Hall's productions. Aristocrats, based on the Stella Tillyard biography of the Lennox sisters in 1999, was another major production.

One of Hall's drama productions, made as a Christmas show for the BBC in 2003, was the BAFTA-winning The Young Visiters starring Jim Broadbent, Hugh Laurie, Bill Nighy, Sally Hawkins and Simon Russell Beale. It was narrated by Alan Bennett, and directed by David Yates. The score, by Nicholas Hooper, won the BAFTA award for Original Television Music.

In 2005, he received a Primetime Emmy Award nomination for producing Pride (2004).. This was a ground breaking drama where the talents of a natural history filmmaker, John Downer, were combined with the Henson Company to produce a Simon Nye drama about a young lioness voiced by Kate Winslet.

In 2011, he produced Hidden, a four-part drama written by Ronan Bennett, starring Philip Glenister, and was creative producer on Labyrinth. He served as producer on a 2012 adaptation of The Last Weekend by Blake Morrison, scripted by Mick Ford for Carnival Films and ITV. In 2013, he produced the Carnival Films ITV pilot Murder on the Home Front. He also completed a ten-part series Dracula for NBC and Sky Living, starring Jonathan Rhys Meyers. He produced the 13-part medical drama Critical for Sky One and Hat Trick written by Jed Mercurio.

Hall produced The Durrells (2016–2019), four series based on Gerald Durrell's books about his family's life on the Greek island of Corfu. He produced two series of Bloodlands, starring James Nesbitt for Hattrick. His production Showtrial for World Productions aired in 2021. Between 2022 and 2024 he produced the ten-part series Day of the Jackal starring Eddie Redmayne for Carnival Films, Sky, Peacock and NBC Universal which was shot in Hungary, Croatia, Austria and England. He is currently producing Honey a six part drama for Sid Gentle Films, The BBC and ZDF.

== Productions ==
As producer

Honey (2026)

- The Day of the Jackal (2024)
- Showtrial (2021)
- Bloodlands (2021)
- The Durrells (2016–19)
- Critical (2015)
- Dracula (2013)
- Murder on the Home Front (2013)
- The Last Weekend (2012)
- Labyrinth (2012)
- Hidden (2011)
- Case Sensitive (2011)
- Ice (2011)
- The Fixer (2008)
- Burn Up (2008)
- The Commander (4) (2006–2007)
- Trial & Retribution (6) (2005–2007)
- Archangel (2005)
- Pride (2004)
- The Young Visiters (2003)
- The Hound of the Baskervilles (2002)
- The Lost World (2001)
- Other People's Children (2000)
- Blue Murder (2000)
- Aristocrats (1999)
- The Final Passage (1996)

As associate producer

- Agatha Christie's Poirot (1996)
- The Fragile Heart (1996)
- Bugs (1995)
- Anna Lee (1994)
- London's Burning (1990–1994)
