= Family (2024 film) =

Psychological horror film by Benjamin Finkel

- Theatrical release poster
- Directed by: Benjamin Finkel
- Written by: Benjamin Finkel
- Produced by: Benjamin Finkel; Samantha Housman; Lynette Howell Taylor
- Starring: Ruth Wilson; Cameron Dawson Gray; Ben Chaplin; Ryan Lucy; Allan Corduner; Beau McConnell
- Cinematography: Elisha Christian
- Edited by: David Barker; Julia Bloch
- Music by: Logan Nelson
- Production companies: 51 Entertainment; Fifth Season
- Distributed by: Vertical
- Release dates: March 8, 2024 (SXSW); September 25, 2026 (Limited)
- Running time: 95 minutes
- Country: United States
- Language: English

Family is a 2024 American psychological horror film written and directed by Benjamin Finkel in his feature directorial debut. The film stars Ruth Wilson, Ben Chaplin, Cameron Dawson Gray, Ryan Lucy, Allan Corduner and Beau McConnell.

The film premiered at the SXSW Film Festival on March 8, 2024, where it won the Kickstarter NextGen Award, before receiving a commercial theatrical and VOD release by Vertical on September 25, 2026.

== Premise ==
A 10-year-old girl finds herself trapped in a haunting fantasy world after believing her parents are trying to kill her.

== Cast ==
- Ruth Wilson as Naomi
- Cameron Dawson Gray as Johanna
- Ben Chaplin as Harry
- Ryan Lucy
- Allan Corduner
- Beau McConnell

== Production ==
Writer-director Benjamin Finkel began developing the story at age 14, drawing heavily from his own childhood experiences following the loss of his father to cancer. Principal photography took place primarily in a single domestic location, utilizing a small indie cast and sparse special effects to amplify a claustrophobic atmosphere of domestic dread.

== Release ==
Family held its world premiere at the SXSW Film Festival on March 8, 2024, taking home the Kickstarter NextGen Award. In August 2026, Vertical acquired distribution rights and set the film for a limited theatrical release and digital VOD release in the United States on September 25, 2026.

== Reception ==
On the review aggregator website Rotten Tomatoes, 64% of 11 critics' reviews are positive, with an average rating of 6.00/10.

Meagan Navarro of Bloody Disgusting gave the film a positive feedback and a 3 out of 5 rating and wrote: A strange, unwieldy slice of arthouse horror that’s heightened by Benjamin Finkel’s knack for viscerally disturbing horror and imagery. Katie Rife of IndieWire gave the film a positive review and a B- rating and she said: Much of “Family” plays like a calling card, for its director and for its young star.

Caryn James of The Hollywood Reporter was impressed and gave the film a positive feedback, she wrote: The film becomes increasingly tense and emotionally wrenching, even as Finkel ramps up genre touches that come to feel superfluous. J Hurtado of ScreenAnarchy was amazed by the emotional depth of the film, he said that: There is a deep emotional resonance to Family that allows it to connect and convey the terror and sadness of loss that betrays the fact that this is Finkel’s first feature. Heart-breaking and horrifying, Family is incredible.

Matt Donato of Collider also gave the film a positive review and a 7 out of 10 rating and he wrote: Family goes for big swings in the back half but takes the phrase “Home Sweet Hell” to heart, delivering something uniquely unsettling that never concedes its ideas to appease the masses.

=== Accolades ===
Year	Event	Category	Recipient	Result	Ref.
2024	SXSW Film Festival	Kickstarter NextGen Award	Family	Won	
