= Mrs Wilson (TV series) =

British television series

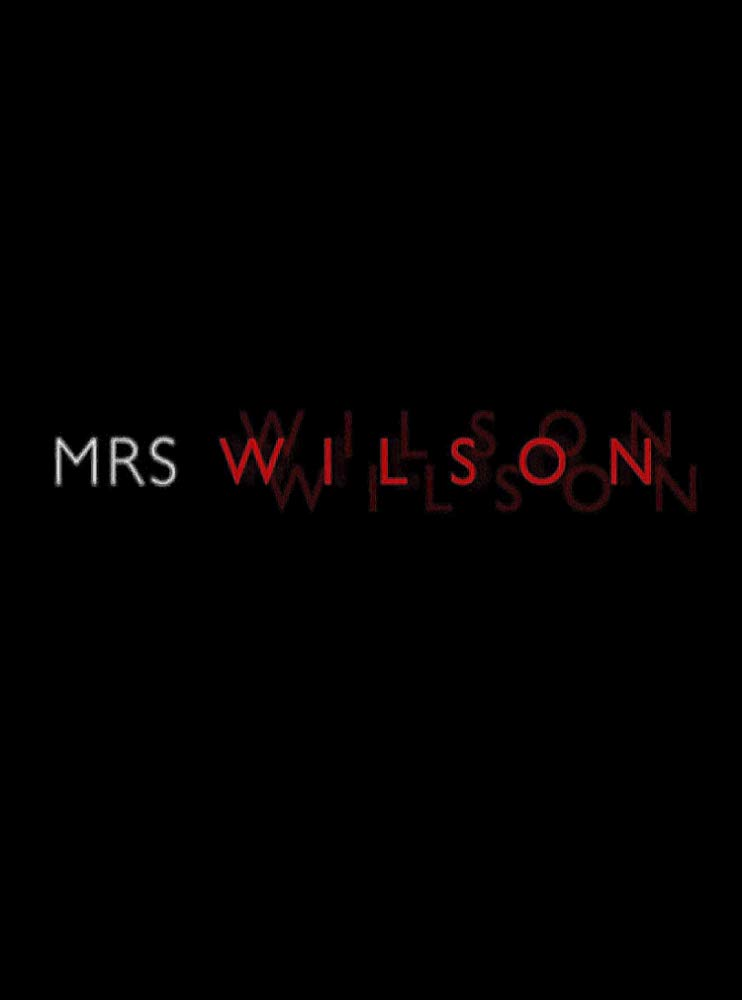
- Genre: Historical drama
- Written by: Anna Symon
- Directed by: Richard Laxton
- Starring: Ruth Wilson; Iain Glen; Anupam Kher; Patrick Kennedy; Otto Farrant; Calam Lynch; Fiona Shaw; Keeley Hawes
- Country of origin: United Kingdom
- Original language: English
- No. of episodes: 3

Production
- Executive producers: Ruth Wilson; Ruth Kenley-Letts; Neil Blair; Lucy Richer; Rebecca Eaton
- Producer: Jackie Larkin
- Production locations: London; Northern Ireland
- Running time: 56–58 minutes
- Production company: Snowed-In Productions

Original release
- Network: BBC One
- Release: 27 November – 11 December 2018

Mrs Wilson (formerly known as The Wilsons) is a 2018 British historical drama serial, executive-produced by and starring Ruth Wilson. The actress plays her real-life grandmother, a widow who uncovers a mysterious and secret life following the death of her husband. It first aired on BBC One in the United Kingdom on 27 November 2018 and debuted in the United States on PBS Masterpiece on 31 March 2019. It aired in Ireland on RTÉ2 in May–June 2021.

== Plot ==
In 1963, Alison Wilson's happy home life is shattered upon the death of her husband, novelist and former MI6 officer Alexander "Alec" Wilson. Everything she knew about her husband of 22 years quickly unravels when she discovers she is not the only Mrs Wilson. She tries to shield her two sons as she reconciles her marriage with her husband's activities as a foreign intelligence officer.

== Cast ==
- Ruth Wilson as Alison Wilson
- Iain Glen as Alexander "Alec" Wilson
- Anupam Kher as Shahbaz Karim
- Patrick Kennedy as Dennis Wilson
- Otto Farrant as Nigel Wilson
- Calam Lynch as Gordon Wilson
- Fiona Shaw as Coleman
- Keeley Hawes as Dorothy Wick
- Elizabeth Rider as Gladys Wilson
- Gemma McElhinney as Elizabeth Wilson
- Wilf Scolding as Mike Shannon

== Episodes ==
No.	Title	Directed by	Written by	Original release date	U.K. viewers (millions)
1	"Episode 1"	Richard Laxton	Anna Symon	27 November 2018	9.41
In Ealing in 1963, housewife Alison Wilson is stunned when Alec, her husband of 22 years, dies of a sudden heart attack. As she grieves with their two sons, Gordon and Nigel, she is even more stunned when another woman arrives at her door claiming to be Mrs Gladys Wilson, Alec's widow. Alison, who met Alec while working at Secret Intelligence Service headquarters during the war, realises her husband lied about being divorced. The Mrs Wilsons agree to cooperate with the burial to avoid a public scandal and Gordon and Nigel discovering the truth. Alison's investigation continues when she discovers a third wife through Karim, Alec's handler in India.
2	"Episode 2"	Richard Laxton	Anna Symon	4 December 2018	8.91
Alison finds Dorothy, whom Alec married while stationed in India before the war. Dorothy, who discovered Alec's affair with Alison, left London during the war and told their son, Michael, that Alec was killed during one of the battles of el Alamein. Alison also realises that Alec's lies were not merely about his wives; Blakefield House, a large estate used as a hospital during the war, was not the ancestral family home they would live in one day, as he had told Alison and their sons. Alison discovers that before the war, Alec's handler introduced him to Dorothy, an actress, as part of his cover in Lahore. Dorothy believed Gladys was Alec's sister and married him in a sham ceremony when she became pregnant. Karim tells Alison that Alec saved hundreds of lives through his work as a spy, and she must let it go – but she refuses.
3	"Episode 3"	Richard Laxton	Anna Symon	11 December 2018	8.75
At the end of the war, Alec is arrested for theft, which he claims is a cover to infiltrate fascists in prison. In 1963, Gordon reveals that he knows Blakefield is not theirs and that he once saw his father working in a hospital as a porter. Alison is determined to prove to her sons that their father indeed worked in the Foreign Office. Alec's boss at MI6 tells her that Alec was a pathological liar who was sacked in 1942 for fabricating intelligence but Karim insists he was set up by a double agent who wanted Alec's job, to feed intelligence to Moscow. Just when Alison's faith in Alec seems restored, a young boy and his mother arrive at the Wilson home looking for his father – Alec. The boy believes Alec is a doctor and his mother, a nurse, announces herself as Mrs Wilson. In 1967, Alison finds peace by becoming a nun and is finally able to tell the truth to her sons. The series ends by showing all of Alec Wilson's living descendants, who first met their extended families in 2007 and by stating that in 2018, the Foreign Office still refused to release its files on Alec Wilson, declaring them to be too sensitive.
