= Hugh Mitchell (actor) =

English actor

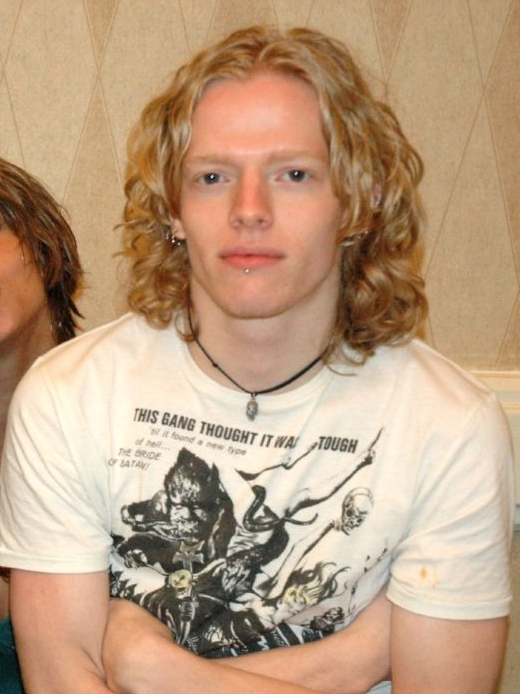
- Mitchell in 2008
- Born: 7 September 1989 (age 36); Winchester, Hampshire, England
- Occupation: Actor
- Years active: 2002–2016

Hugh Mitchell (born 7 September 1989) is an English professional photographer and former actor, best known for playing Colin Creevey in Harry Potter and the Chamber of Secrets. He also appeared in The White Queen as Richard Welles, alongside Max Irons.

Mitchell attended The Pilgrims' School, Winchester, from 1999 to 2003. After Pilgrims' he went to the King Edward VI School, Southampton, from 2003 to 2006 and later Peter Symonds College.

== Filmography ==
=== Film ===
Year	Title	Role	Notes
2002	Harry Potter and the Chamber of Secrets	Colin Creevey	
2002	Nicholas Nickleby	Young Nicholas Nickleby	
2003	State of Mind	Adam Watson	TV movie
2003	Wondrous Oblivion	Hargreaves	
2003	Henry VIII	Prince Edward	TV movie
2003	Interviews with Students	Himself	Video documentary short
2005	Tom Brown's School Days	Ron Green	TV movie
2005	Beneath the Skin	Josh Hintlesham	TV movie
2006	The Da Vinci Code	Young Silas	
2009	Tormented	Tim	
2012	The Last Weekend: Behind the Scenes	Himself	Documentary short

=== Television ===
Year	Title	Role	Notes
2006	Judge John Deed	Macdonald Brock	TV series; 1 Episode: "Lost Youth"
2007	Waking the Dead	Mark Lennon	TV series; 2 episodes: "Double Bind: Part 1"; "Double Bind: Part 2"
2010	Life of Riley	Ben	TV series; 1 Episode: "Crazy"
2012	The Last Weekend	Archie	TV series; 3 episodes: Episodes #1.1 and #2.3
2012	Parade's End	Bennett 2nd Lieutenant	TV series; 1 Episode: "Episode #1.5"
2013	The White Queen	Richard Welles	TV series; 2 episodes: "The Storm" and "The Price of Power"
2013	Whitechapel	William Tierney Clarke	TV series; 1 Episode: "Episode #4.4"
2015	Holby City	Teddy Framton	TV series; 1 Episode: "Series 17:31 Lifelines"
2016	Wallander	Pontus Ericsson	TV series; 1 Episode: "Series 4:2 A Lesson in Love"

=== Video games ===
Year	Title	Role	Notes
2007	Harry Potter and the Order of the Phoenix	Colin Creevey	Voice
