= Ruth Wilson =

English actress

Ruth Wilson MBE
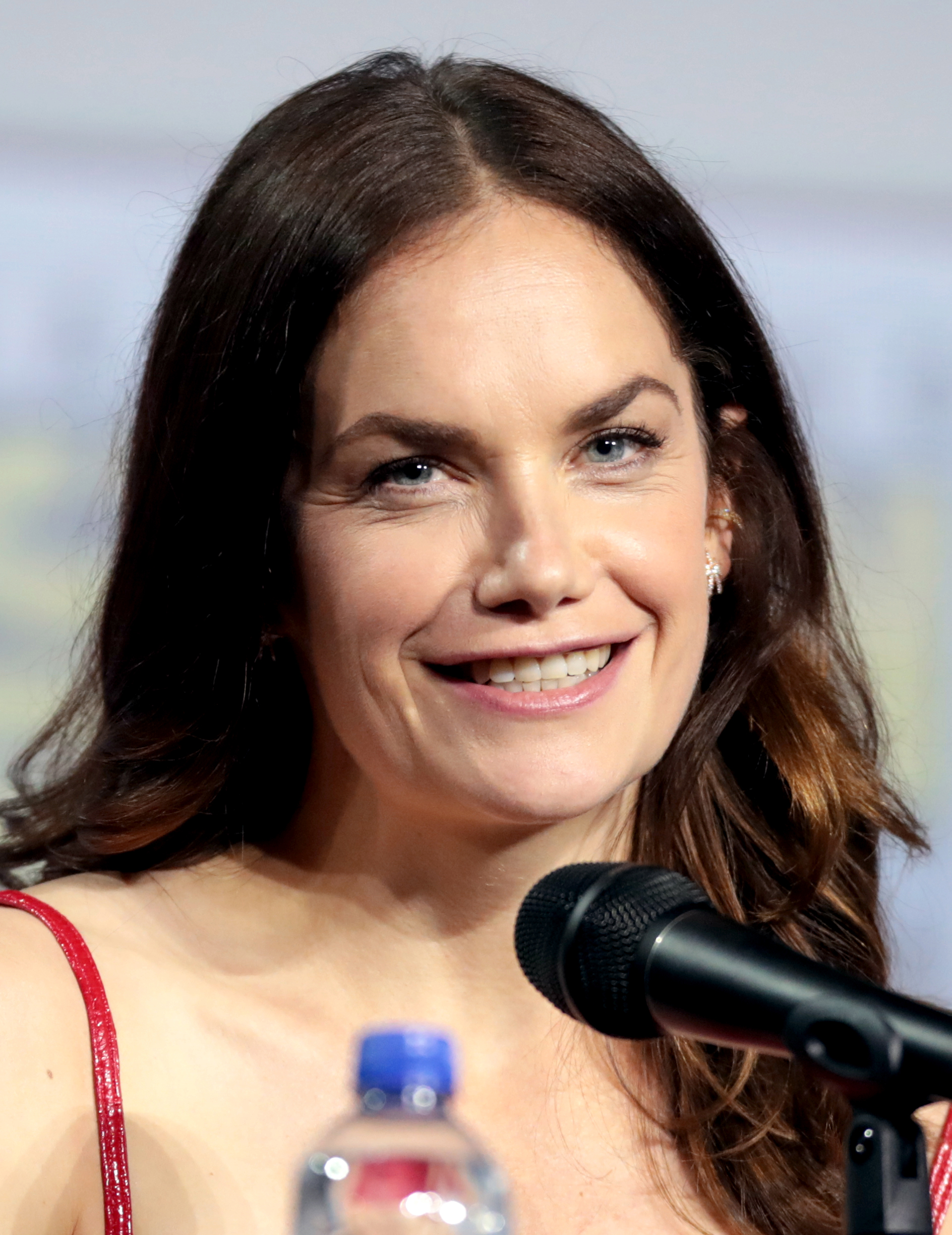
- Wilson at the 2019 San Diego Comic-Con
- Born: 13 January 1982 (age 44); Ashford, Surrey, England
- Education: University of Nottingham; London Academy of Music and Dramatic Art
- Occupation: Actress
- Years active: 2003–present
- Relatives: Alexander Wilson (grandfather); Dennis Wilson (half-uncle)
- Awards: See awards

Ruth Wilson (born 13 January 1982) is an English actress. She has played the title character in Jane Eyre (2006), Alice Morgan in the BBC psychological crime drama Luther (2010–2013, 2019), Alison Lockhart in the Showtime drama The Affair (2014–2018), and the title character, her real-life paternal grandmother, in Mrs Wilson (2018). From 2019 to 2022, she portrayed Marisa Coulter in the BBC/HBO fantasy series His Dark Materials, and for this role she won the 2020 BAFTA Cymru Award for Best Actress. Her film credits include The Lone Ranger (2013), Saving Mr. Banks (2013), I Am the Pretty Thing That Lives in the House (2016), and Dark River (2017).

Wilson is a three-time Olivier Award nominee and two-time winner, earning the Best Actress for the title role in Anna Christie, and the Best Supporting Actress for her portrayal of Stella Kowalski in A Streetcar Named Desire. She is also a two-time Tony Award nominee for her performances in Constellations and King Lear on Broadway. She has won a Golden Globe for her role in The Affair and received nominations for a British Academy Television Award for Best Actress and a Golden Globe Award for Best Actress – Television Series Drama for the title role in Jane Eyre.

== Early life and education ==
Wilson was born in Ashford, Surrey, the daughter of Nigel Wilson, an investment banker, and Mary Metson, a probation officer. She has three older brothers. She is the granddaughter of novelist and MI6 officer Alexander Wilson and his third, bigamously-married, wife, Alison (née McKelvie). Her paternal great-grandmother was Irish. Wilson grew up in Shepperton, Surrey, and was raised as a Catholic.

She attended Notre Dame School, Surrey, an independent Catholic school for girls located in Cobham, before attending sixth form at Esher College. She attended Riverside Youth Theatre in Sunbury-on-Thames where she appeared in productions of The Curse of Fladsham House and The Wyrd Sisters. As a teenager, she worked as a model. She studied history at the University of Nottingham, and while there was also involved in student drama at the Nottingham New Theatre. She graduated from Nottingham in 2003 and from the London Academy of Music and Dramatic Art (LAMDA) in July 2005. Afterwards, she co-founded Hush Productions. During her time at Nottingham, she participated in the TV war strategy game Time Commanders, helping her teammates fight in the Battle of Pharsalus, and in the Tony Livesey TV gameshow Traitor.

== Career ==
Prior to her role in Jane Eyre, Wilson had one professional screen credit, in Suburban Shootout, a situation comedy she appeared in with Tom Hiddleston. In 2006–2007, she filmed the second series of Suburban Shootout, a new Agatha Christie's Marple mystery (Nemesis) for ITV, and Stephen Poliakoff's BBC television drama Capturing Mary as the young Mary.

Wilson appeared in Gorky's Philistines in 2007, playing Tanya, at the Royal National Theatre from May until August. In June, she presented the 2007 Lilian Baylis Awards. Other projects in 2007 included a guest appearance in the sitcom Freezing as Alison Fennel (BBC2, 21 February 2008); narration of the documentary The Polish Ambulance Murders (BBC4, 5 February 2008); and the portrayal of a mentally ill doctor in the dramatised documentary The Doctor Who Hears Voices (Channel 4, 21 April 2008).

From 23 July to 3 October 2009, she appeared as Stella Kowalski in the Donmar Warehouse revival of A Streetcar Named Desire. On 15 November 2009 AMC Television and ITV premiered the 2009 TV miniseries remake of The Prisoner, in which Wilson played the Village doctor, "No. 313". She played "Queenie" in an adaptation of Andrea Levy's Small Island, which aired on BBC1 in December 2009 and also aired in the United States on PBS in 2010.

From 2010, she appeared in the British psychological police drama Luther as Alice Morgan, a research scientist and highly intelligent individual described by Luther as a narcissist. While Wilson could not appear in series four of Luther due to filming clashing with The Affair, she returned for series five.

From 4 August to 8 October 2011, Wilson starred in the title role of Eugene O'Neill's Anna Christie at the Donmar Warehouse alongside Jude Law. Her performance prompted The Guardian to devote an editorial to Wilson's "courageous, edgy and compelling talent".

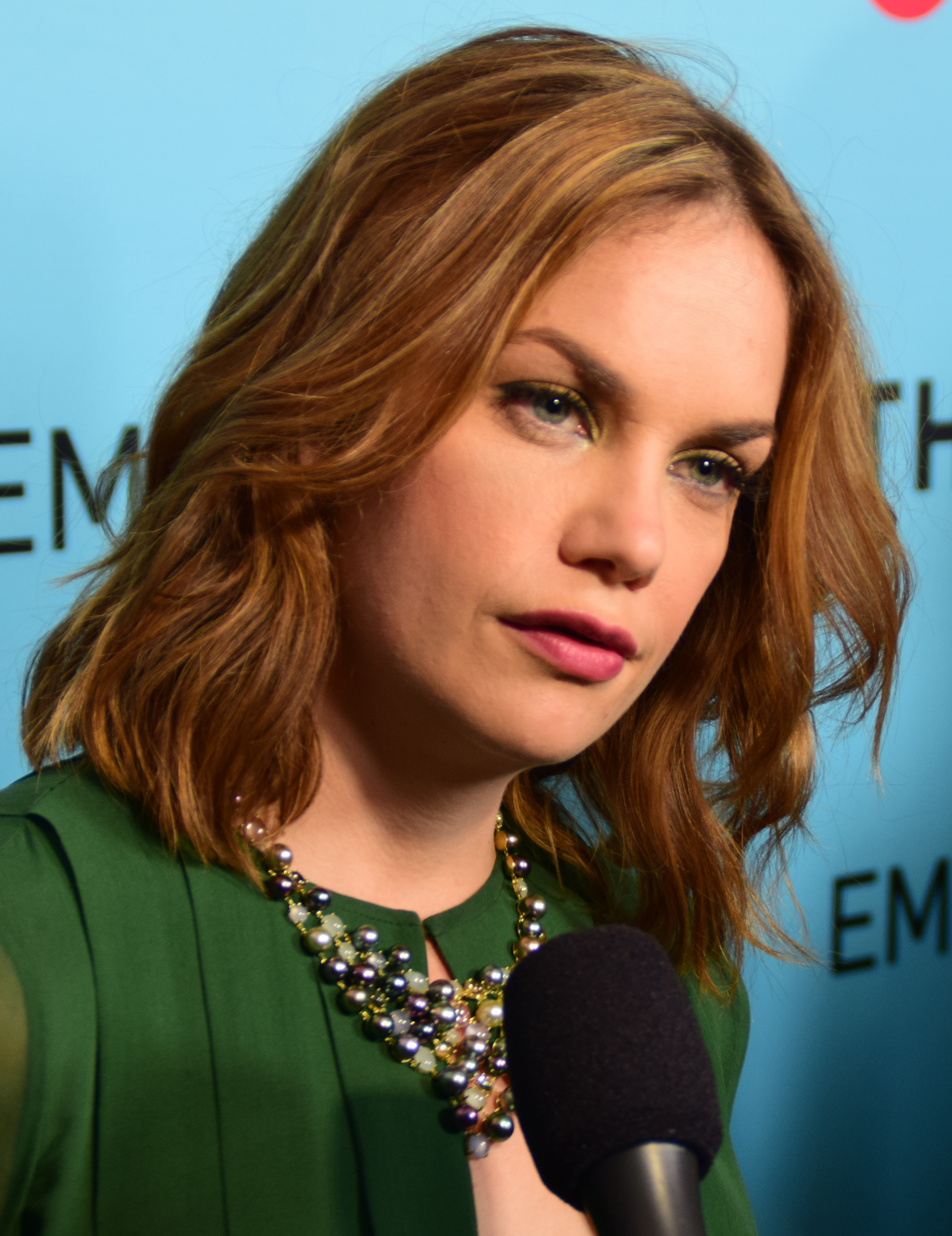
Wilson at Showtime's The Affair FYC Screening and Panel in 2015

In 2014, Wilson began starring as Alison Bailey in the drama television series The Affair, created by Sarah Treem and Hagai Levi. She won the Golden Globe Award for Best Actress – Television Series Drama in January 2015 for her performance in the series' first season. She departed the series in 2018 after four seasons. It was reported in December 2019 that Wilson's departure was due to "frustrations with the nudity required of her, friction with Treem over the direction of her character, and what she ultimately felt was a 'hostile work environment'".

Wilson made her Broadway debut in Constellations, a play written by Nick Payne, at the Samuel J. Friedman Theatre. She starred alongside Jake Gyllenhaal throughout the play's run from 12 January to 14 March 2015. She received a Tony Award nomination for Best Actress in a Play for her performance.

Her film I Am the Pretty Thing That Lives in the House, directed by Oz Perkins, premiered at the 2016 Toronto International Film Festival. From December 2016 to February 2017, Wilson starred in the title role of Hedda Gabler in a new version by Patrick Marber at the Royal National Theatre. The production, and Wilson's performance in particular, received critical acclaim.

In November 2018, Wilson starred as the title character Alison Wilson—her real-life grandmother—in the BBC drama Mrs Wilson. Alison Wilson was the third of four wives of former MI6 officer and novelist Alexander Wilson. They were married for 22 years. After his death in 1963, Alison discovered another wife of her husband, with whom she eventually collaborated on the funeral. In order not to create extra shock for his children, the other wife and her children attended the funeral as "distant relatives". Alison died in 2005 without knowing about her husband's two other wives. Wilson was also the executive producer for the series.

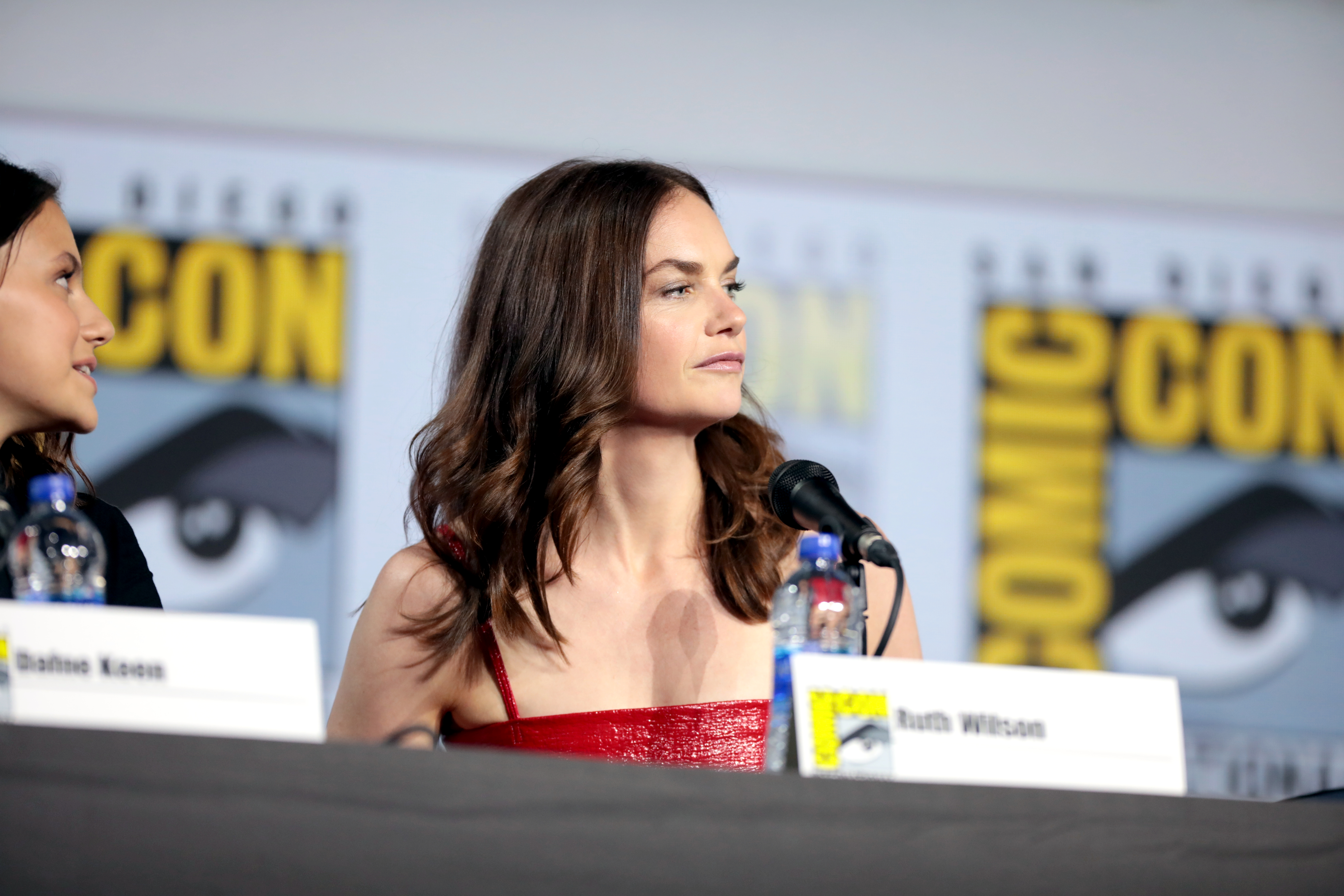
Wilson speaking at the 2019 San Diego Comic-Con

In October 2020, Wilson won the BAFTA Cymru Award for Best Actress for her portrayal of Marisa Coulter in His Dark Materials. In November 2020, it was announced that she would be starring as Norwegian diplomat Mona Juul in a filmed version of J. T. Rogers' Tony Award-winning play Oslo.

In 2024, Wilson starred as the BBC journalist Emily Maitlis in the series A Very Royal Scandal.

== Other activities ==
In September 2024, Wilson was named as an ambassador of dementia charity Alzheimer's Research UK.

== Honours ==
Wilson was appointed a Member of the Order of the British Empire (MBE) in the 2021 Birthday Honours for services to drama.

== Personal life ==
Wilson has been in a long-term relationship with an unnamed American writer. In 2023, Wilson stated that, while she does believe in connections and has a strong relationship herself, she doesn't believe in institutions such as marriage.

== Filmography ==
Key
†	Denotes films that have not yet been released

=== Film ===
Year	Title	Role	Notes
2007	Get Off My Land	Woman	Short film
2012	Anna Karenina	Princess Betsy Tverskoy	
2013	The Lone Ranger	Rebecca Reid	
2013	Saving Mr. Banks	Margaret Goff	
2013	Locke	Katrina (voice)	
2015	Suite Française	Madeleine Labarie	
2015	Eleanor	Eleanor	Short film
2016	The Complete Walk: All's Well That Ends Well	Helena	Short film
2016	I Am the Pretty Thing That Lives in the House	Lily	
2017	How to Talk to Girls at Parties	PT Stella	
2017	The Dying Hours	Ellie	Short film
2017	Dark River	Alice Bell	
2018	The Little Stranger	Caroline Ayres	
2021	True Things	Kate	Also producer
2022	See How They Run	Petula Spencer	
2024	Family	Naomi	Also executive producer
2025	Urchin	voice of Meditation Tape	
2026	Victorian Psycho	Mrs. Pounds	
TBA †	Andorra	Miss Quay	Post-production
TBA †	Luther 3	Alice Morgan	Filming

=== Television ===
Year	Title	Role	Notes
2003	Time Commanders	Herself	Episode: "Pharsalus"
2004	Traitor	Herself	Episode 5
2006	Jane Eyre	Jane Eyre	Miniseries, 4 episodes
2006–2007	Suburban Shootout	Jewel Diamond	10 episodes
2007	Agatha Christie's Marple	Georgina Barrow	Episode: "Nemesis"
2007	Capturing Mary	Young Mary	Television film
2007	A Real Summer	Mary / Geraldine	Television film
2008	Freezing	Alison Fennel	Episode: "#1.2"
2008	The Doctor Who Hears Voices	Dr. Ruth	Television film
2009	Small Island	Queenie	Miniseries, 2 episodes
2009	The Prisoner	313 / Doctor	Miniseries, 6 episodes
2010–2019	Luther	Alice Morgan	13 episodes
2014–2019	The Affair	Alison Bailey	Main role, 42 episodes
2017	Reported Missing	Narrator	Series 1, 3 episodes
2018	Mrs Wilson	Alison Wilson	Miniseries, 3 episodes, also executive producer
2019–2022	His Dark Materials	Marisa Coulter	Main role, 21 episodes
2020	James and the Giant Peach with Taika and Friends	Earthworm	Miniseries, 1 episode
2021	Oslo	Mona Juul	Television film
2023	The Woman in the Wall	Lorna Brady	Main role, 6 episodes, also executive producer
2024	A Very Royal Scandal	Emily Maitlis	Miniseries, 3 episodes
2025	Down Cemetery Road	Sarah Trafford	TV series

=== Theatre ===
Year	Title	Role	Venue(s)	Ref.
2005	Good		Sound Theatre	
2007	Philistines	Tanya	Lyttelton Theatre / Royal National Theatre	
2009	A Streetcar Named Desire	Stella Kowalski	Donmar Warehouse	
2010	Through a Glass Darkly	Karin	Almeida Theatre	
2011	Anna Christie	Anna Christie	Donmar Warehouse	
2013	The El Train	Mrs Rowland, Rose	Hoxton Hall	
2015	Constellations	Marianne	Samuel J. Friedman Theatre	
2016–2017	Hedda Gabler	Hedda Gabler	Royal National Theatre	
2019	King Lear	Cordelia / Fool	Cort Theatre	
2022	The Human Voice	Woman	Harold Pinter Theatre	
2023	The Second Woman	Virginia	The Young Vic	
2025	A Moon for the Misbegotten	Josie Hogan	Almeida Theatre	

=== Radio ===
Year	Title	Role	Channel
2008	The Mayor of Casterbridge	Elizabeth-Jane	BBC Radio 4
2009	The Promise	Lika	BBC Radio 3
2009	The Lady of the Camellias	Marguerite Gautier	BBC Radio 4
2010	Spitfire!	Daphne	BBC Radio 4

=== Audiobooks ===
Year	Title	Role	Notes	Ref.
2008	Dolphin Song	Narrator	White Giraffe Series (abridged)	
2020	To the Lighthouse	Narrator	Penguin Classics edition of Virginia Woolf's novel	
2023	Galatea	Narrator	Madeline Miller short story	
2024	His Dark Materials: The Golden Compass	Narrator	Philip Pullman trilogy, Book 1	
2025	His Dark Materials: The Subtle Knife	Narrator	Philip Pullman trilogy, Book 2	
2025	His Dark Materials: The Amber Spyglass	Narrator	Philip Pullman trilogy, Book 3	
TBA	Harry Potter: The Full-Cast Audio Editions	Bellatrix Lestrange	Audible Exclusive	

== Awards and nominations ==
Year	Association	Category	Work	Result	Ref.
2007	British Academy Television Award	Best Actress	Jane Eyre	Nominated	
2007	Broadcasting Press Guild	Best Actress	Jane Eyre	Nominated	
2007	Golden Globe Award	Best Performance by an Actress in a Miniseries or Television Film	Jane Eyre	Nominated	
2007	Satellite Awards	Best Actress – Miniseries or Television Film	Jane Eyre	Nominated	
2010	Satellite Awards	Best Actress – Miniseries or Television Film	Luther	Nominated	
2010	Laurence Olivier Award	Best Actress in a Supporting Role	A Streetcar Named Desire	Won	
2012	Laurence Olivier Award	Best Actress	Anna Christie	Won	
2014	Golden Globe Award	Best Actress – Television Series Drama	The Affair	Won	
2015	Satellite Awards	Best Actress in a Drama Series	The Affair	Nominated	
2015	Tony Award	Best Leading Actress in a Play	Constellations	Nominated	
2015	Theatre World Award		Constellations	Honoree	
2017	Satellite Awards	Best Actress in a Drama Series	The Affair	Nominated	
2017	British Independent Film Award	Best Performance by an Actress in a British Independent Film	Dark River	Nominated	
2017	Laurence Olivier Award	Best Actress	Hedda Gabler	Nominated	
2019	British Academy Television Award	Best Actress in a Leading Role	Mrs Wilson	Nominated	
2019	British Academy Television Award	Best Mini-Series	Mrs Wilson	Nominated	
2019	Broadcasting Press Guild	Best Actress	Mrs Wilson	Nominated	
2019	Drama League Award	Distinguished Performance	King Lear	Nominated	
2019	Drama Desk Award	Outstanding Featured Actress in a Play	King Lear	Nominated	
2019	Tony Award	Best Featured Actress in a Play	King Lear	Nominated	
2020	BAFTA Cymru	Best Actress	His Dark Materials	Won	
2021	British Independent Film Award	Best Actress	True Things	Nominated	
2021	Stockholm International Film Festival	Best Actress	True Things	Won	
2021	Satellite Awards	Actress in a Miniseries, Limited Series or Motion Picture made for Television	Oslo	Nominated	
2023	BAFTA Cymru	Best Actress	His Dark Materials	Nominated	
2024	RTS Northern Ireland Television Awards	Best Actor – Female	The Woman in the Wall	Won	
2025	National Television Awards	Best Drama Performance	A Very Royal Scandal	Nominated	
2025	Evening Standard Theatre Awards	Best Actress	A Moon for the Misbegotten	Nominated	
