= Pride (2004 film) =

- DVD cover
- Written by: Simon Nye
- Directed by: John Downer
- Starring: Kate Winslet; Helen Mirren; Rupert Graves; Sean Bean; Jim Broadbent; Robbie Coltrane; Martin Freeman; John Hurt
- Theme music composer: George Fenton
- Country of origin: United Kingdom
- Original language: English

Production
- Executive producers: Delia Fine; Simon Curtis; Laura Mackie
- Producers: John Downer; Christopher Hall
- Running time: 110 minutes

Original release
- Network: BBC
- Release: 2004

Pride is a 2004 British television comedy-drama film about two lion cubs as they grow up and face the harsh realities of adulthood. Produced by the BBC and shown on A&E in the U.S., the film features the voices of numerous British actors and uses CG technology to enhance footage of actual lions and other animals. Jim Henson's Creature Shop provided the special effects and animatronics for the film. It was shot in Tanzania's Serengeti National Park.

== Plot ==
Suki, her cowardly brother Linus, and their conceited cousin Fleck are all lion cubs. When two rogue lions, Dark and Harry or otherwise known as "The Wanderers", attack and while the lionesses help, they kill Fleck's mother Eve leaving him an orphan. Suki and Linus decide to go exploring and find out how the Wanderers got across the river. Their mother Macheeba thought it impossible for the Wanderers to get across as there are Nile crocodiles in the river. Suki and Linus find a dead tree making a bridge, which is probably how the Wanderers got across. Elephants destroy the bridge leaving the cubs (and the Wanderers) trapped. When they meet Dark, he saves them from a pack of spotted hyenas, and Suki develops a crush on him. She and Linus have no choice but to swim across the river, and they successfully do.

As the cubs become teenagers, Suki and Linus are taught to hunt. Suki does not want to hunt and becomes a vegetarian. Fleck thinks that Suki and Linus do not like him because he is an orphan. Often in the film, Linus tries to practice hunting but is humiliated twice (being urinated on by an olive baboon, and trying to hunt a banded mongoose, but is chased up a tree by a herd of cape buffalo). When Suki, Fleck, and Linus are adults, Suki refuses to hunt/contribute to the pride as she sees it as cruelty to kill animals, therefore rendering her useless or another mouth to feed to the other lions, and, seeing as she does not see that she fits in, leaves the pride and becomes a Wanderer. After a year with the Wanderers, Suki now has Dark's cubs but still refuses to hunt. One night Harry, who killed Fleck's mother, eats all but one of Suki's cubs, Rory. Harry claims they went missing and threatens for her last cub to "go missing" if she does not contribute. That night Suki overhears Harry talking to Dark about striking another attack on the pride saying they will kill them all. Outraged, Suki goes back to warn her pride about the impending attack.

On her way back, Suki meets Lush, a lion who left the pride to see the rest of the world. Suki asks him to help her find some food and help fight the Wanderers. She hunts for the first time to provide food for the pride as they have not eaten for a while. Since the pride will not accept Fleck, he decides to join the Wanderers. Soon a fight erupts on the mountain top containing Harry and Linus where Harry dies by falling off the cliff side after Dark refuses to help him because Dark had just found out what Harry did to his cubs. Both Fleck and Dark leave after the battle, with Fleck threatening his revenge, claiming he will come back with an entire group of "highly-trained lions." Suki mates with Lush and has his cubs as Linus decides to leave to see the rest of the world and vows to come back when he is needed.

== Voice cast ==
- Kate Winslet as Suki
- Helen Mirren as Macheeba
- Rupert Graves as Linus
- Sean Bean as Dark
- Jim Broadbent as Eddie
- Robbie Coltrane as James
- Martin Freeman as Fleck
- John Hurt as Harry
- Kwame Kwei-Armah as Lush
