= Patrick Kennedy (actor) =

English actor (born 1977)

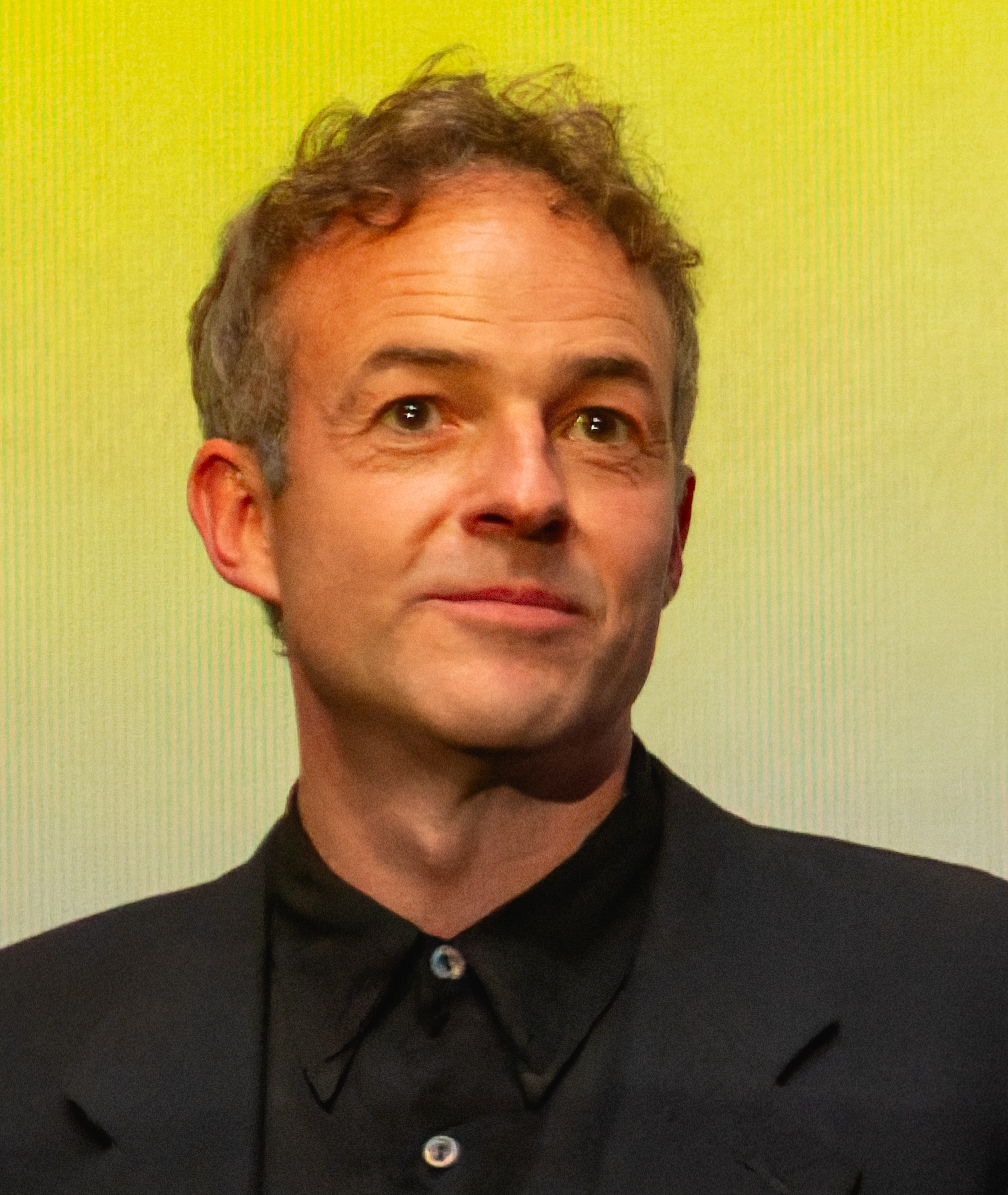
- Kennedy in 2025
- Born: 26 August 1977 (age 49); London, England
- Occupations: Actor; director
- Years active: 2002–present

Patrick Kennedy (born 26 August 1977) is an English actor and director.

== Education ==
He studied English literature and language at St John's College, Oxford, and then attended LAMDA.

== Career ==
Kennedy's first screen role was in Peter Greenaway's The Tulse Luper Suitcases, followed by the role of Julian Bell in the BBC's Cambridge Spies.

Kennedy's first lead role was playing Richard Carstone in the BBC adaptation of Charles Dickens' Bleak House, and he followed this with roles in Joe Wright's Atonement, Steven Spielberg's Munich, Richard Linklater's Me and Orson Welles, and Michael Hoffman's The Last Station.

Kennedy recurred on the television series Boardwalk Empire in 2012, earning a nomination for the Screen Actors Guild Award for Outstanding Performance by an Ensemble in a Drama Series, and played the role of McKechnie in the Susanna White-directed and Tom Stoppard-written Parade's End.

Kennedy's recent television roles have included Will in Atlanta (season 3), Mark Bolton in Liaison, Neil in Peep Show (series 8), a principal role in ITV's Murder on the Home Front, alongside Tamzin Merchant, a lead opposite Brendan Gleeson in the HBO pilot The Money, Sampson in ITV's Downton Abbey, Jock Colville in Churchill's Secret with Michael Gambon and directed by Charles Sturridge, and recurring roles in Hulu's The First, Mrs Wilson for the BBC, and Allston Wheatley in Scott Frank's The Queen's Gambit for Netflix. He appeared in several episodes of The Day of the Jackal as the target UDC's partner.

Kennedy's other film roles include Lieutenant Waverly in Spielberg's War Horse, Roger Donaldson's The November Man, Bill Condon's Mr Holmes (with Ian McKellen), Babak Najafi's London Has Fallen, Lt. Col. Guy L'Estrange in Mike Leigh's Peterloo; and as Edward Aveling opposite Romola Garai in Susanna Nicchiarelli's Miss Marx.

Kennedy's stage roles include Lysander in A Midsummer Night's Dream at the Bristol Old Vic (directed by David Farr); George Holly in Michael Grandage's production of Suddenly Last Summer with Diana Rigg and Victoria Hamilton in the West End; the lead role of Jonathan in Everything Is Illuminated at The Hampstead Theatre; Camille in Therese Raquin, at the National Theatre, directed by Marianne Elliott; Tom in The Glass Menagerie, for Shared Experience; Oliver in Polly Stenham's No Quarter, directed by Jeremy Herrin at the Royal Court; and Don Caspar in Anna Ziegler's Photograph 51, with Nicole Kidman, directed by Michael Grandage at the Noel Coward Theatre.

In 2017, Kennedy took the lead roles in Harold Pinter's The Lover and The Collection, directed by Michael Kahn for the Shakespeare Theatre Company, Lansburgh Theatre, Washington D.C.

Kennedy has worked on several films with the British artist Nathaniel Mellors, playing the recurring Neanderthal character Voggen Williams in The Sophisticated Neanderthal Interview, Neanderthal Container, and the pub lecher, Uncle Tommy, in the Ourhouse series.

In 2018, Kennedy wrote and directed the short film The Human Voice, starring Rosamund Pike, adapted from the Jean Cocteau play La Voix Humaine. Kennedy portrayed astronaut Michael Collins in the documentary of the Apollo 11 mission, 8 Days: To the Moon and Back, shown on BBC2 on 10 July 2019.

== Filmography ==
=== Film ===
Year	Title	Role	Notes
2002	Nine Lives	Tim	
2003	The Tulse Luper Suitcases, Part 1: The Moab Story	Joris Salmon	
2005	Mrs Henderson Presents	Pilot	
2005	Munich	English Reporter in Munich Underground	
2006	A Good Year	Trader #2	
2007	Atonement	Leon Tallis	
2008	In Tranzit	Peter	
2008	Me and Orson Welles	Grover Burgess (Ligarius)	
2008	Scratch	Simon	Short film
2009	The Last Station	Sergeyenko	
2011	War Horse	Lt. Charlie Waverley	
2011	Pirates of the Caribbean: On Stranger Tides	English Father	
2014	The November Man	Edgar Simpson	
2014	Dreaming of Leo	Jonathan	Short film
2015	Mr. Holmes	Thomas Kelmot	
2016	London Has Fallen	John Lancaster, MI5 Intelligence Chief	
2016	So Good to See You		Short film
2018	Peterloo	Lt. Col. Guy L'Estrange	
2019	Star Wars: The Rise of Skywalker	First Order Officer	
2020	Miss Marx	Edward Aveling	
2025	Blue Moon	E. B. White	
2026	Ink	Bernard Shrimsley	

=== Television ===
Year	Title	Role	Notes
2002	Spooks	Radio Operator (uncredited)	Episode: "Traitor's Gate"
2003	Cambridge Spies	Julian Bell	Miniseries; 2 episodes
2004	The Inspector Lynley Mysteries	Gideon Martin	Episode: "A Traitor to Memory"
2005	The Somme	Sgt. R. H. Tawney	TV film
2005	Bleak House	Richard Carstone	Miniseries; 12 episodes
2008	The 39 Steps	Harry Sinclair	TV film
2008	Consuming Passion: 100 Years of Mills & Boon	Gerard Mills	TV film
2008	Einstein and Eddington	William Marston	TV film
2010	Married Single Other	Dr. Dominic	Episode: "Chink"
2011	Black Mirror	Section Chief Walker	Episode: "The National Anthem"
2012	Parade's End	McKechnie	3 episodes
2012	Boardwalk Empire	Dr. Douglas Mason	7 episodes
2012	Peep Show	Neil	3 episodes
2013	Murder on the Home Front	Lennox Collins	TV film
2013	Downton Abbey	Terence Sampson	3 episodes
2014	The Money	John Castman	TV film
2015	Person of Interest	Dr. Shane Edwards	Episode: "Karma"
2016	Churchill's Secret	Jock Colville	TV film
2016	The Collection	Gambon	2 episodes
2018	Mrs Wilson	Dennis Wilson	Miniseries; 3 episodes
2018	The First	Ollie Bennett	3 episodes
2019	8 Days: To the Moon and Back	Astronaut Michael Collins	BBC2 TV documentary
2019	World on Fire	Campbell	Episode #1.3
2020	The Queen's Gambit	Allston Wheatley	3 episodes
2021	Around the World in 80 Days	Sir Henry Rowbotham	Episode #1.5
2022	Atlanta	Will	Episode: "The Old Man and the Tree"
2023	Death in Paradise	David Cartwright	2 episodes
2023	Liaison	Mark Bolton	6 episodes
2024	Franklin	Strachey	2 episodes
2024	Senna	Ron Dennis	6 episodes
2024	The Day of the Jackal	Teddy	5 episodes
2025	Dept. Q	Liam Taylor	5 episodes

== Theatre ==
Year	Production	Role	Venue
2002	Maps of Desire	Charles	Southwark Playhouse, London
2003	A Midsummer Night's Dream	Lysander	Bristol Old Vic
2003	Les Liaisons Dangereuses	Danceny	Bristol Old Vic
2004	Suddenly, Last Summer	George	UK Tour
2006	Everything Is Illuminated	Jonathan	Hampstead Theatre, London
2006	Therese Raquin	Camille	National Theatre, London
2010	The Glass Menagerie	Tom	Shared Experience Tour
2010	Measure for Measure	Lucio	Touring Company, London
2013	No Quarter	Oliver	Royal Court Theatre
2015	Photograph 51	Donald Caspar	Noël Coward Theatre
2016	Oil	Samuel	Almeida Theatre
2017	The Lover	Richard	Shakespeare Theatre Company, Washington, D.C.
2017	The Collection	James	Shakespeare Theatre Company, Washington, D.C.
