= Dennis Wilson (poet) =

British poet (1921–2022)

- Born: 25 June 1921
- Died: 28 June 2022 (aged 101)
- Occupation: Poet
- Parents: Alexander Wilson; Gladys Kellaway
- Relatives: Ruth Wilson (niece)

Dennis B. Wilson (25 June 1921 – 28 June 2022) was a British poet known mainly for his writings as a soldier in World War II.

== Biography ==
Poems he wrote during the 1944 Normandy landings were published for the first time in 2012 by Kultura Press with the assistance of Tim Crook, a researcher at Goldsmiths College who was working on a biography of Wilson's father, the writer and spy Alexander Wilson. His mother was Alexander Wilson's first wife, Gladys.

He had two siblings, and had four half-siblings through his polygamous father's further three marriages.

In 2018, he was depicted by the actor Patrick Kennedy in the BBC drama about Alexander Wilson, Mrs Wilson. Also appearing in the series was his real-life niece, actress Ruth Wilson, portraying her grandmother.

Wilson turned 100 in June 2021, and died on 28 June 2022, at the age of 101.

== Publications ==
- The Poetry of a Marriage. Kultura Press. 2008. ISBN 978-0954289973.
- Haughtyculture or the Gardening Muse. Kultura Press. 2011. ISBN 978-0954289997.
- Elegy of a Common Soldier and Other Poems. Kultura Press. 2012. ISBN 978-1908842008.
- A Celebration of Children. Kultura Press. 2012. ISBN 978-1908842015.
- From Bard To Verse and Poetic Epics. Kultura Press. 2012. ISBN 978-1908842022.
