= Emma Pierson =

English actress (born 1981)

- Born: Emma Jane Pierson; 30 April 1981 (age 45); Plymouth, Devon, England
- Occupation: Actress
- Years active: 1999–present

Emma Jane Pierson (born 30 April 1981) is an English actress. Her appearances in television programmes include the role of Anna Thornton-Wilton in the BBC television drama Hotel Babylon, and SunTrap, Days Like These, Beast, I Saw You, Charles II: The Power and The Passion, The Worst Week of My Life, Bloodlines, Coupling, Time Gentlemen Please, Dead Boss and Killing Eve.

== Early life and education ==
The daughter of a nurse and a Royal Navy submariner, Pierson was born Emma Jane Pierson on 30 April 1981 in Plymouth, Devon. Her father, Charles, was stationed at Faslane Naval Base on the Clyde where Emma spent the first four years of her life.

When she was in her teens, Pierson lived with her parents and three siblings in North Bradley, near Trowbridge, Wiltshire, attending Grittleton House School and then later St Laurence School in nearby Bradford on Avon where she began taking acting lessons.

After leaving school in 1997, Pierson performed in amateur productions with the North Bradley players, appearing in a number of plays including Chekhov's Uncle Vanya.

Pierson gained the role of Becky Radcliffe in the BBC children's drama series Grange Hill while studying law at the City of Bath College.

== Career ==
After leaving Grange Hill, Pierson took on the role of Jackie Burgett in Days Like These, an ITV sitcom set in Luton and adapted from the American comedy series That '70s Show. However, Days Like These proved unsuccessful and the series was cancelled after only ten of its thirteen episodes were aired.

Pierson has continued to appear in comedy series, including various episodes of the Channel 4 sketch show Armstrong and Miller, Beast with Alexander Armstrong and The Worst Week of My Life with Ben Miller. In 2002, following the departure from the series of Julia Sawalha, Pierson played new character student barmaid Connie in the second series of sitcom Time Gentlemen Please, written by Al Murray and Richard Herring, and appeared in an episode of the sitcom Coupling.

Pierson's roles have included comedy dramas Bedtime and Legend of the Tamworth Two. In 2010 she starred in the Radio 4 comedy series "House on Fire".

Pierson has appeared the dramas Stranded, the Hallmark channel's version of Swiss Family Robinson, BBC political drama The Project, Charles II and an as yet unreleased low-budget film, The Engagement, from the director of Sirens, John Duigan.

In 2005, Pierson played the role of policewoman Justine Hopkin in the two-part ITV drama, Bloodlines. She has since acted in other dramas, such as Riot at the Rite, a period drama about Russian dancer Nijinsky, and Hotel Babylon, a BBC series based on the book of the same name by Imogen Edwards-Jones and portraying life behind the scenes in a London hotel.

In the 2006 indie film The Lives of the Saints, Pierson played the character Tina. This was her first major film role, after lesser roles in Virtual Sexuality and Guest House Paradiso early in her career.

In 2016, Pierson portrayed an adoptive mother (Jess) whose worst nightmare came true when her daughters biological mother turns up and tries to destroy her family in the BBC Three series "Cuckoo".

== Filmography ==
=== Film ===
Year	Film	Role
1999	Virtual Sexuality	Fiona
1999	Guest House Paradiso	Saucy Wood Nymph
2001	Dumping Elaine	Waitress
2002	Stranded	Sarah Robinson
2002	I Saw You	Zoë
2002	The Project	Juliette
2003	Uncle Douglas	Sarah Tomkinson
2004	The Legend of the Tamworth Two	Jenny West
2005	Angell's Hell	Flo
2005	Bloodlines	Justine Hopkin
2005	Riot at the Rite	Romola
2006	The Lives of the Saints	Tina
2010	Barbie in A Mermaid Tale	Kayla
2011	Nancy, Sid and Sergio	Nancy
2014	Sophia Grace and Rosie's Royal Adventure	Princess Cordelia
2015	Absolutely Anything	Miss Pringle

=== Television ===
Year	Title	Role	Notes
1999	Days Like These	Jackie Burget	Main role
1999	Grange Hill	Becky Radcliffe	?
2000	Beast	Jade	Main role
2001	Armstrong and Miller aka: The Armstrong and Miller Show	N/A	Various episodes
2001	Absolutely Fabulous	Kasha	Episode: "Small Opening"
2001	Bedtime	Sapphire	Main role (series 1)
2002	Coupling	Jennifer	Episode: "The Girl with One Heart"
2002	Time Gentlemen Please	Connie	Main role (series 2)
2003	A Touch of Frost	Alice Thompson	Episode: "Held in Trust"
2003	My Hero	Dr Chelsea	Episode: "Big"
2003	Charles II: The Power and The Passion	Nell Gwynn	1 episode
2004	The Worst Week of My Life	Sophie Cook	Main role
2004	The Last Chancers	Kirby	Main role
2005	Twisted Tales	Jane	Episode: "The Irredeemable Brain of Dr. Heinrich Hunsecker"
2005	The Brief	Kelly Byrne	Episode: "Forever on the Mind"
2006	Morning Glory	Herself	Episode 1.10
2006–2009	Hotel Babylon	Anna Thornton-Wilton	Main role
2007	Talk to Me	Ally	Various episodes
2007	Who Gets the Dog	Tara	1 episode
2008	Little Dorrit	Fanny Dorrit	Various episodes
2010	Money	Selina Street	Main role
2012	Dead Boss	Mrs Bridges	Episodes 1, 3
2013	Death in Paradise	Anna Jones	Episode 2.3
2013	Love Matters	Cox	Episode: "Officially Special"
2013	Up the Women	Eva	Main role
2015	SunTrap	Melody	Main role
2015	The Kennedys	Jenny	Main role (series 1)
2016	Cuckoo	Jess	Recurring role (series 3)
2019	Killing Eve	Gemma	Recurring role (series 2)

=== Music videos ===
Year	Artist	Track	Role
2003	Thea Gilmore	"Juliet"	Girl in a Cage

=== Video games ===
Year	Game	Role	Notes
2011	Dark Souls	Anastacia of Astora/Dusk of Oolacile	Voice
2020	Xenoblade Chronicles: Definitive Edition	Nene	Voice
