= Hotel Babylon =

Hotel Babylon may refer to:

== Television ==
- Hotel Babylon (BBC series), a 2000s BBC drama series
- Hotel Babylon (music programme), a 1990s ITV late night music programme

== Literature ==
- Hotel Babylon (novel), a novel by Imogen Edwards-Jones
- The Grand Babylon Hotel, a novel by Arnold Bennett

== Film ==
- The Grand Babylon Hotel (1916 film), a British silent thriller film directed by Frank Wilson
- The Grand Babylon Hotel (1920 film), a German silent mystery film directed by E.A. Dupont

== Other uses ==
- Babylon Rotana Baghdad Hotel, a hotel in Baghdad, Iraq
