= Anna Wilson-Jones =

English actress (born 1970)

- Born: Anna Louise Wilson Jones; 8 October 1970 (age 56); Woking, Surrey, England
- Occupation: Actress
- Years active: 1993–present
- Spouse: Steve John Shepherd
- Children: 3

Anna Wilson-Jones (born 8 October 1970) is an English actress. She is known for her roles as Juliet Miller in the television series Hotel Babylon and main character Tim Bisley's ex-girlfriend Sarah in the series Spaced.

== Acting career ==
In 1999, she appeared as Katie May in the six part mockumentary Boyz Unlimited. In 2000, she appeared as Sandra Harrison in the last episode of Inspector Morse, "The Remorseful Day". From 2004 to 2005, she was in the Sky One television series Hex, as Jo Watkins, and in 2006 the Channel 4 adaptation of the novel Sugar Rush, as Anna. She has also appeared in As If, Monarch of the Glen, Wonderful You, Waterloo Road, Rosemary & Thyme in 2003 in the episode "The Language of Flowers" and Ashes to Ashes. Wilson-Jones has also featured in Midsomer Murders in 2005 and 2013; the 2005–6 ITV parapsychology drama afterlife in which she plays Jude Bridge, the former wife of Robert Bridge (played by Andrew Lincoln); and from June 2007 she appeared as Sally in an ITV drama serial The Time of Your Life. In 2009 she joined the cast of Hotel Babylon as Juliet Miller, hotel general manager.

In late 2011, she appeared in "The National Anthem", the first episode of the anthology series Black Mirror. She also starred in "The Night Watch" based on the novel by Sarah Waters released in 2012 for the BBC. She played the character of Julia Standing, a lesbian writer, who lived in London during the Second World War. Wilson-Jones has also featured in Misfits as Laura, in season 2. Also in 2011, she played Rosalind Rydell in two episodes of the first season of DCI Banks, "Cold is the Grave: Part 1" and "Cold is the Grave: Part 2". She also played Davinia in Series 2 of the Channel 4 series PhoneShop, broadcast in 2011. In 2016, Wilson-Jones joined the cast of the ITV drama Victoria, playing the part of Emma Portman, Viscountess Portman, one of Queen Victoria's ladies-in-waiting. She has been a regular in all three series to date. She also served as the narrator for the novel Victoria, written by the television series' creator, Daisy Goodwin. On 9 January 2017, Jones appeared as Ellie Timpson in Silent Witness in the episode "Discovery". On 10 February 2018, Jones appeared as Linda Ashworth in Casualty.

== Personal life ==
She is married to actor Steve John Shepherd. They have three children.

== Filmography ==
Year	Film	Role	Other notes
1998	Vigo: A Passion for Life	Genya Lozinska	
2001	Tomorrow	Claire	
2002	Mrs Caldicot's Cabbage War	Veronica	
2003	The Mother	Helen	
2003	The Silent Treatment	Sara	(Short)
2003	Killing Time	Woman	(Short)
2004	Gladiatress	Lofacta	
2009	Another Thing	Brunette woman	(Short)
2016	Noro	Meryl	(Short)
2016	Take Down	Frances Herrick	
2016	Away from Me	Sarah	(Short)
2018	Ghosted	Sherry	(Short)
2019	The Last Boy	Jenna	
Year	Television series	Role	Other notes
1994	The Bill	Stephanie Kerry	TV series, 1 episode
1998	Berkeley Square	Lady Wakeley	TV mini-series, 1 episode
1999	Spaced	Sarah	TV series, 4 episodes
1999	Wonderful You	Gina, Henry's sister	TV mini-series, 7 episodes
1999	Boyz Unlimited	Katie May	TV series, 6 episodes
2000	Inspector Morse	Sandra Harrison	TV series, 1 episode
2000–2001	Monarch of the Glen	Justine Thatcher	TV series, 6 episodes
2001	Randall & Hopkirk (Deceased)	Freya	TV series, 1 episode
2001	Life as We Know It	Olivia	TV series, 1 episode
2001	Big Bad World	Alice	TV series, 1 episode
2001–2002	As If	Gabi	TV series, 1 episode
2002	Covert	Mother	(TV Short)
2003	Jonathan Creek	Sergeant Heather Davey	TV series, 1 episode
2003	Rosemary & Thyme	Kate Pritchard	TV series, 1 episode
2003	The Vice	Elizabeth	TV series, 1 episode
2004	Murder in Suburbia	Grace Bailey	TV series, 1 episode
2004	Red Cap	Lt. Col. Julia MacKesy	TV series, 1 episode
2004	Roman Road	Jenny	TV movie
2004	NY-LON	Tabitha	TV mini-series, 3 episodes
2004	The Brief	Glen Farmer	TV series, 1 episode
2004–2005	Hex	Jo Watkins / Jo	TV series, 10 episodes
2005	The Stepfather	Sasha Munro	TV movie, billed as Anna Wilson Jones
2005–2006	Afterlife	Jude Bridge	TV series, 13 episodes
2005; 2013	Midsomer Murders	Marianna Hartley (2005); Emma Harris (2013)	"Bantling Boy" "Death and the Divas"
2006	Sugar Rush	Anna	TV series, 3 episodes, billed as Anna Wilson Jones
2006	Waterloo Road	Heather Davenport	TV series, 3 episodes, billed as Anna Wilson Jones
2007	The Time of Your Life	Sally	TV mini-series, 6 episodes
2007; 2010	Brilliant!	Sylvia	TV mini-series, 2 episodes
2008	Ashes to Ashes	Joan Cale	TV series, 1 episode
2009	Hotel Babylon	Juliet Miller	TV series, 8 episodes
2010	Come Rain Come Shine	Christina Mitchell	TV movie, billed as Anna Wilson Jones
2010	Misfits	Laura	TV series, 1 episode
2011	Black Mirror	Jane Callow	TV series, 1 episode ("The National Anthem")
2011	PhoneShop	Davinia	TV series, 1 episode
2011	DCI Banks	Rosalind Rydell	TV series, 2 episodes
2011	Law & Order: UK	Camilla Mallon	TV series, 1 episode
2011	The Night Watch	Julia Standing	TV movie
2012	The Life and Adventures of Nick Nickleby	Ms Knag	TV mini-series, 4 episodes
2012	Switch	Phoebe	TV series, 1 episode
2012	Lewis	Stanza Massey	TV series, 1 episode
2016	Marley's Ghosts	Katie Paine	TV series, 1 episode
2016	New Blood	Helen Matherson	TV series, 1 episode
2016–2019	Victoria	Lady Emma Portman	TV series, 19 episodes
2017	Silent Witness	Ellie Timpson	TV series, 1 episode
2018	Succession	Charlotte	TV series, 2 episodes
2018	Shakespeare & Hathaway: Private Investigators	Lady Tania Bede	TV series, 1 episode
2018	Casualty	Linda Ashworth	TV series, 1 episode
2019	Cleaning Up	Janet	TV series, 1 episode
2019	A Confession	Jackie	TV series, 5 episodes in post-production
2020	Agatha Raisin	Tiggy Laggat-Brown	TV series, 2 episodes "The Deadly Dance"
2020	Vera	Orla Cossdale	TV series, Episode: "The Escape Turn"
2020	Breeders	Mrs Hickson	TV series, Episode: "No Places"
2020	The Christmas Ball	Sarrah	TV movie
2022	Industry	Holly	TV series, 1 episodes
2024	Criminal Record	Hester Ash	TV series, 2 episodes
2024	Bridgerton	Lady Livingston	Recurring role, 6 episodes
2024	Showtrial	Tamara Baudin-Kenny	TV series, 5 episodes
