= The Stork Club =

The Stork Club may refer to:

- The Stork Club, a nightclub in New York City, New York, from 1929 to 1965
- The Stork Club, London a nightclub in London
- The Stork Club (film), a 1945 film directed by Hal Walker
- The Stork Club (book), a 2006 book by Imogen Edwards-Jones
