= The History of Tom Jones: a Foundling (TV series) =

British television series

- Genre: Historical
- Based on: Tom Jones by Henry Fielding
- Written by: Simon Burke
- Directed by: Metin Hüseyin
- Starring: Max Beesley; Samantha Morton; John Sessions
- Theme music composer: Jim Parker
- Country of origin: United Kingdom
- Original language: English
- No. of series: 1
- No. of episodes: 5

Production
- Producer: Suzan Harrison
- Running time: 60 minutes
- Production company: BBC

Original release
- Network: BBC One
- Release: 9 November – 7 December 1997

The History of Tom Jones – A Foundling is a five-part TV series produced by the BBC in 1997. It features Max Beesley in the title role, alongside Brian Blessed and Samantha Morton.

It is based on the 1749 picaresque novel of the same name by Henry Fielding.

== Plot ==
The plot follows the life of the protagonist, Tom Jones, a charming rascal. Born to a serving wench, but having grown up in the care of Squire Allworthy, he becomes enamoured of his neighbour's daughter, Sophia Western. It follows Tom's adventures in London.

== Cast ==
- John Sessions as Henry Fielding
- Benjamin Whitrow as Squire Allworthy
- Brian Blessed as Squire Western
- Max Beesley as Tom Jones
- Samantha Morton as Sophia Western
- Frances de la Tour as Aunt Western
- Ron Cook as Mr Partridge
- Richard Ridings as Reverend Thwackum
- Christopher Fulford as Mr Square
- Michael Cronin as Dr Blifil
- Sylvester McCoy as Mr Dowling
- James D'Arcy as Blifil
- Peter Capaldi as Lord Fellamar
- Michelle Fairley as Mrs Fitzpatrick
- Lindsay Duncan as Lady Bellaston
- Kathy Burke as Honour
- Brian Pettifer as Parson Supple
- Camille Coduri as Jenny Jones
- Celia Imrie as Mrs Miller
- Kelly Reilly as Nancy Miller
- Matt Bardock as Jack Nightingale
- Sara Kestelman as Mrs Wilkins
- Tessa Peake-Jones as Bridget Allworthy
- Doreene Blackstock as Abigail
- Richard O'Callaghan as Mr Fitzpatrick
- Roger Lloyd Pack as Anderson
- Brian Hibbard as George Seagrim
- Con O'Neill as Captain Blifil
- Rachel Scorgie as Molly Seagrim
- Jane Danson as Betty Seagrim
- Alexei Sayle as Puppeteer
- Neil Dudgeon as Puppeteer's Assistant
- Paul Barber as Adderley
- Julian Firth as Northerton
- Rupert Holliday-Evans as Lord Connaught
- Amy Marston as Susan
- Norman Lovett as Mr Follett
- June Whitfield as Mrs Whitfield
- Tim Healy as Mr Nightingale Sr

== Episodes ==
| No. | Title | Original release date |
|---|---|---|
| 1 | "Episode 1" | 9 November 1997 |
Abandoned at birth, Tom Jones is adopted by kindly Squire Allworthy. He grows up and falls in love with Sophia Western, daughter of neighbour Squire Western. Unfortunately, she is already betrothed to Blifil and Tom is forced to leave home to seek his fortune in the outside world.
| 2 | "Episode 2" | 16 November 1997 |
Having left home, Tom Jones gets caught up in a Jacobite rebellion, while his love Sophia attempts to escape the threat of marriage to Mr Blifil. At the White Heart Inn a case of mistaken identity causes confusion.
| 3 | "Episode 3" | 23 November 1997 |
Sophia is hotly pursued by Tom on the road to London and both face perils along the way. They encounter a lecherous puppeteer, scheming Harriet Fitzpatrick and voracious Lady Bellaston before being reunited.
| 4 | "Episode 4" | 30 November 1997 |
Tom falls into fashionable company and Sophia is the object of the unwarranted affections of Lord Fellmar. She is saved by the arrival of her father but Bilfil is still pursuing her hand in marriage.
| 5 | "Episode 5" | 7 December 1997 |
With all the characters having entered into a finely balanced web of misunderstandings, schemes and romps, Tom is now faced with a sinful lowness of fortune. This final episode resolves all in a torrent of uncovered truths and happy endings.
