= Doon Mackichan =

British actress, comedian and writer (born 1962)

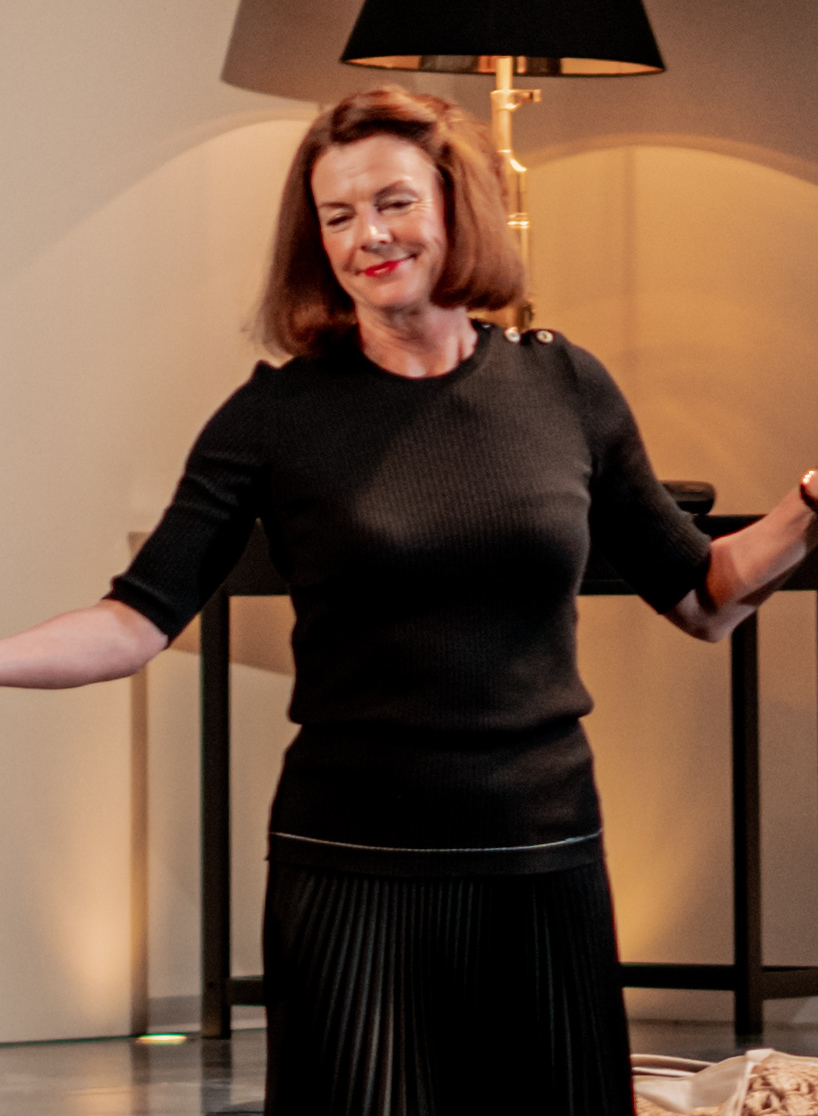
- Mackichan appearing in Bitter Wheat at the Garrick Theatre in 2019
- Born: Sarah Doon Mackichan; 7 August 1962 (age 64); London, England
- Occupations: Actress; comedian; writer
- Years active: 1985–present
- Spouse: Anthony Barclay (m. 1997; div. 2005)
- Children: 3

Sarah Doon Mackichan (/məˈkiːxən, -ˈiːkən/; born 7 August 1962) is a British actress, comedian and writer. She co-wrote and co-starred in the double-Emmy-award-winning sketch comedy series Smack the Pony (1999–2003, 2017). Mackichan frequently collaborates with Chris Morris, Armando Iannucci and Steve Coogan, having played multiple characters in the comedy series The Day Today (1994) and Brass Eye (2001). She played the role of Cathy Whyte in the BBC One sitcom Two Doors Down (2013, 2016–2023, 2025).

Mackichan was nominated for Best Female Comedy Performance at the 2014 British Academy Television Awards for her performance in the ITV2 sitcom Plebs (2013–2018). She was nominated for Best Female Television Comic at the 2014 National Comedy Awards for her performance in the sitcom Toast of London (2013–2015). She won critical praise for her performance alongside John Malkovich in the theatre show Bitter Wheat (2019).

== Early life and education ==
Mackichan was born on 7 August 1962 in London and at the age of 1 moved with her family to the Scottish town of Paisley. She studied drama at Manchester University.

== Career ==
Mackichan had her television debut in comedy series Five Alive, shown by Channel 4 between 1987 and 1988, along with Brian Conley (also making his television debut), Peter Piper, Joanna Brookes and Andrew Secombe. In series 2, shown in 1988, Andrew Secombe was replaced by Phil Nice.

Mackichan, one of the writers and stars of the Channel 4 comedy series Smack the Pony, has appeared in a number of Chris Morris radio and television comedy series such as On the Hour, The Day Today and Brass Eye. Mackichan's own BBC Radio show, Doon Your Way, was broadcast in 1996. She also appeared in the sitcoms Beast and Bedtime, and was a regular performer in Knowing Me, Knowing You... with Alan Partridge and The Mary Whitehouse Experience. She appeared in several of The Comic Strip Presents... films in the early 1990s, and appeared in the 1995 comedy The Glam Metal Detectives. In 2009, she appeared as Jane Thomason, the news producer for the BBC in Taking the Flak. She portrayed Cherie Blair in the Channel 4 satirical drama A Very Social Secretary, and appeared in the Channel 4 sitcom Nathan Barley. She portrayed a BBC news presenter, Louise Marlowe, in series 4 of The Sarah Jane Adventures in 2010.

In film, Mackichan played Victoria Lender in 1997's The Borrowers and teamed up with her former Smack the Pony co-stars for the 2004 film Gladiatress. Also in 1998 she appeared in the BBC TV mini-series of Dickens' novel Our Mutual Friend as Sophronia Lammle.

On stage, she appeared with Matt Di Angelo and David Haig in the Joe Orton black farce Loot. In July 2011, Mackichan performed alongside Julian Barratt in Nikolai Gogol's comedy The Government Inspector at the Young Vic Theatre, London. Later in 2011, she played the part of Frances in April de Angelis' play Jumpy at the Royal Court Theatre. Since 2013, Mackichan has starred in Toast of London as Steven Toast's (Matt Berry) quirky agent Jane Plough.

She has narrated several TV series including The Honey Trap and Bank of Mum and Dad. She has also voiced characters in several animated series including Bob and Margaret, Stressed Eric, Don't Eat the Neighbours and Bromwell High.

She fronted a TV ad campaign for Hallmark in the UK, and appeared alongside Darren Boyd as one half of a married couple for a series of Direct Line insurance TV ads in 2012.

She was a contestant in the 2003 BBC charity singing contest Comic Relief does Fame Academy, in which she came fourth.

She has appeared twice on the BBC panel show QI, in series C, episode 2, ("Cummingtonite", 2005) and series E episode 11, ("Endings", 2007).

From 2013 until 2018, Mackichan played Flavia, a recurring character, in the ITV comedy Plebs, for which she was nominated for the British Academy Television Award for Best Female Comedy Performance in 2014. She played Cathy in the BBC comedy Two Doors Down from 2013 until 2022, when she decided to quit the show to concentrate on other acting roles. In June 2023 it was announced she would be returning to this role in the forthcoming series.

In 2017 she played Feste in the Royal National Theatre's production of Twelfth Night and television film Death on the Tyne in 2018. Mackichan appeared as the Archangel Michael in the Amazon Prime/BBC mini-series Good Omens and as Sarah in Channel 4 comedy-drama Pure in 2019.

In 2019 she appeared as Sondra in David Mamet's Bitter Wheat at the Garrick Theatre. Writing in The Guardian, Michael Billington praised her as having given the show's best performance.

Mackichan was cast as the Archangel Michael in seasons 2 and 3 of the series Good Omens.

In 2024, Mackichan won the Bafta Award for Best Actress Television for her work in Two Doors Down.

== Personal life ==
In 1997, Mackichan married the actor Anthony Barclay. In 1998, she swam the English Channel as part of a six-person relay team.

Mackichan and Barclay were divorced in 2005, after having three children together. She then lived with her children in Clapham, South London. In 2016, she was living in Hastings, East Sussex.

In March 2016, Mackichan was part of a team of well-known people who attempted to sail around a section of Britain in just five days, as part of the BT Sport Relief Challenge: Hell on High Seas.

== Acting credits ==
=== Film ===
Year	Title	Role	Notes
1997	The Borrowers	Victoria Lender	
1999	With or Without You	Deirdre	
2000	Wild About Harry	Tara Adair	
2003	Indian Dream	Penny	TV film
2004	Gladiatress	Dwyfuc	
2004	Churchill: The Hollywood Years	Radio Host	Deleted scenes
2005	A Very Social Secretary	Cherie Blair	TV film
2006	The Good Housekeeping Guide	Lydia	TV film
2011	Anuvahood	Patricia	
2012	Acts of Godfrey	Jacqui	
2012	Never Had You	Miss Bewson	Short
2013	Homeboys	Sue	TV film
2013	Two Doors Down	Cathy	TV film, pilot to TV series
2014	Breaking the Bank	Caroline	
2015	Draw on Sweet Night	Lady Elizabeth Kytson	
2016	Scarlet	Female Shopper	Short
2017	National Theatre Live: Twelfth Night	Feste	
2018	Death on the Tyne	Emily	TV film
2018	Winterlong	Barbara	
2018	Happy New Year, Colin Burstead	Sandy	
2022	The Sea Beast	Queen	Voice role

=== Television ===
Year	Title	Role	Notes
1986	Five Alive	Various roles	15 episodes
1986, 1989	Hale and Pace	Various roles / Have a Nice Time Presenter	2 episodes
1990	Harry Enfield's Television Programme	Dont's Daughter	2 episodes
1990	Birds of a Feather	Nurse	Episode: "Parting"
1990	Up Yer News	Various roles	
1991	The Mary Whitehouse Experience	Various roles	Episode: "Series 1, Episode 1"
1991	London's Burning	Female Journalist	Episode: "Series 4, Episode 10"
1992	Sean's Show	Scriptwriter	Episode: "Blind Date"
1992–1993	The Comic Strip Presents...	Various roles	5 episodes
1994	The Day Today	Various roles / Collaterlie Sisters	Series regular, 7 episodes
1994	Knowing Me Knowing You with Alan Partridge	Shona McGough	Episode: "Show 1"
1994	Knowing Me Knowing You with Alan Partridge	Wanda Harvey	Episode: "Show 6"
1995	The Glam Metal Detectives	Various roles	Series regular, 5 episodes
1995	Knowing Me Knowing You with Alan Partridge	Liz Heron	Episode: "Knowing Me Knowing Yule with Alan Partridge"
1995	Agony Again	Debra	7 episodes
1997	I'm Alan Partridge	Jenny	Episode: "Watership Alan"
1997	Brass Eye	Various roles	4 episodes
1998	Our Mutual Friend	Sophronia Lammle	Mini-series, 4 episodes
1998	Bob and Margaret	Various roles / Moira	6 episodes, voice role
1998–2000	Stressed Eric	Maria Gonzalez / Alison Scabie	Series regular, voice role, 13 episodes
1999–2003, 2017	Smack the Pony	Various roles	Series regular, 24 episodes
2000	The Strangerers	Galadriel	2 episodes: "Space Cadets" and "Angels"
2000	The Canterbury Tales	Alison	Episode: "The Journey Back", voice role
2000–2001	Beast	Kirsten	Series regular, 12 episodes
2001	Brass Eye	Swanchita Haze	Episode: "Paedophilia"
2001	Don't Eat the Neighbours	Lucy	
2001	Bob and Margaret	Various roles	Episode: "A Very Fishy Christmas", voice role
2002	Bedtime	Faith	Series 2 regular, 6 episodes
2002	Wire in the Blood	Amanda Vane	2 episodes: "Shadows Rising, Parts 1 & 2"
2005	Nathan Barley	Her Preposterous Voice	Mini-series, 1 episode
2005	Twisted Tales	Sandra Barnes	Episode: "Cursed House"
2005	The Comic Strip Presents...	Diana	Episode: "Sex Actually"
2005	Bromwell High	Carol Jackson / Various roles	Series regular, voice role, 13 episodes
2008	Modern Toss	Various roles	Series regular, voice role, 6 episodes
2009	Taking the Flak	Jane Thomason	Series regular, 7 episodes
2010	New Tricks	Gillian Withall	Episode: "Left Field"
2010	The Sarah Jane Adventures	Louise Marlowe	Episode: "The Nightmare Man"
2012	Me and Mrs Jones	Selina	Episode: "Series 1, Episode 6"
2012	Little Crackers	Mum	Episode: "Darren Boyd's Little Cracker: Le Concert de L'ecole"
2013	Quick Cuts	Sue	3 episodes
2013–2015	Toast of London	Jane Plough	Series regular, 18 episodes
2013–2018	Plebs	Flavia	Series regular, 20 episodes
2014	Psychobitches	Various roles	Mini-series, 3 episodes
2015	Mountain Goats	Norma	Episode: "Homeless"
2016	Mid Morning Matters with Alan Partridge	The Partridge Playhouse Players / Caller	3 episodes, voice roles
2016	The Rebel	Doctor McGill	Episode: "Law"
2016–2025	Two Doors Down	Cathy	Series regular 1–5 and 7, 36 episodes
2019	Pure	Sarah	Recurring role, 4 episodes
2019–2026	Good Omens	Archangel Michael	Recurring role, 8 episodes
2020	Flack	Victoria	Episode: "Duncan"
2020	The Duchess	Cheryl	3 episodes
2022	Toast of Tinseltown	Jane Plough / Brooke Hooberman (credited as Cocoah Mankind)	6 episodes
2023	Funny Woman	Miss Sykes	2 episodes: "Series 1, Episodes 1 and 3"
2023	Death in Paradise	Melanie Parker	1 episode: "Christmas Special"
2025	The Scarecrows’ Wedding	Various roles	1 Episode
2026	Ludwig	Portia Lowery	1 Episode
2026	Living the Dream	Various roles	

=== Theatre ===
Year	Title	Role	Venue	Notes
1987	To Kill a Mockingbird	Mayella	Birmingham Repertory Theatre, Birmingham	
1988	'Tis Pity She's a Whore	Annabella	Stephen Joseph Theatre, Scarborough	
1990	The Square		Battersea Arts Centre, London	
1991	Abigail's Party	Beverly Moss	Cambridge Theatre, London	also, UK Tour
1992	Me and My Friend	Julia	Minerva Studio, Chichester Festival Theatre, Chichester	
1992	Killers	Veronica	Royal Court Theatre, London	
1994	Road	Carol/Lane/Valerie	Royal Court Theatre, London	also, UK Tour
1994	The Queen and I	Diana, Princess of Wales	Leicester Haymarket Theatre, Leicester	
1995	Mother Courage and Her Children	Yvette Pottier	Royal National Theatre, London	
1996	A Midsummer Night's Dream	Helena	Almeida Theatre, London	also, International Tour
1999	Sacred Heart	Kate	Royal National Theatre, London	
1999	Emma	Emma Woodhouse	Watford Palace Theatre, Watford	
2003	Excuses!	Olivia	Soho Theatre, London	
2007	A Respectable Wedding	The Wife	Young Vic, London	
2007	Boeing-Boeing	Gretchen	Comedy Theatre, London	
2008	Loot	Faye	Tricycle Theatre, London	
2011	The Government Inspector	Anna Andreyevna	Young Vic, London	
2012	Jumpy	Frances	Royal Court Theatre, London & Duke of York's Theatre, London	
2017	Twelfth Night	Feste	Royal National Theatre, London	
2019	Bitter Wheat	Sondra	Garrick Theatre, London	

== Awards and nominations ==
Year	Award	Category	Work	Result
2012	WhatsOnStage Awards	Best Supporting Actress In A Play	Jumpy	Nominated
2014	BAFTA Television Awards	Best Female Comedy Performance	Plebs	Nominated
2014	British Comedy Awards	Best Female Television Comic	Toast of London	Nominated
2024	BAFTA Scotland Awards	Best Actress Television	Two Doors Down	Won

== See also ==
- List of British actors
