= The Mother (2003 film) =

- US Theatrical poster
- Directed by: Roger Michell
- Written by: Hanif Kureishi
- Produced by: Kevin Loader
- Starring: Anne Reid; Daniel Craig; Steven Mackintosh; Cathryn Bradshaw; Oliver Ford Davies; Anna Wilson-Jones; Peter Vaughan
- Cinematography: Alwin H. Küchler
- Edited by: Nicolas Gaster
- Music by: Jeremy Sams
- Production company: BBC Films
- Distributed by: Momentum Pictures
- Release date: 16 May 2003 (Cannes); 14 November 2003
- Running time: 112 minutes
- Country: United Kingdom
- Language: English
- Budget: $2.5 million
- Box office: $3 million

The Mother is a 2003 British drama film directed by Roger Michell and written by Hanif Kureishi. It stars Anne Reid, Daniel Craig, Peter Vaughan, Steven Mackintosh, and Cathryn Bradshaw.

The film had its world premiere at the 2003 Cannes Film Festival in the Directors Fortnight section.

== Plot ==
May is a woman from Northern England. Her life has been constrained by the expectations of society and her husband. When her husband dies during a visit to their adult children in London, she has a chance to start again and pursue her love of drawing.

May is quiet but when her son Bobby tries to make her sit down and have a cup of tea she refuses, saying she might never get up and that she won't become invisible like all the neighbouring grandmothers and widows. May returns to London with Bobby to the horror of Helen, Bobby's wife.

May initiates a sexual affair with Darren, a warm and attractive younger man who is renovating Bobby and Helen's house and who is also her daughter Paula's boyfriend. Paula says he is a sweet man but weak. He has a wife and autistic son but lives in his van outside their house. Darren appears to share May's interest in art and the unlikely pair form an understanding.

May moves from Bobby's house to Paula's and discovers Paula is having therapy because her mother didn't cuddle her enough. At a writing group organised by Paula, May writes a short account of being a depressed mother of two young children. It is a very public explanation, perhaps, for her lack of affection. Paula introduces her mother to Bruce, a man near May's age. Paula wants her mother to find out if Darren will leave his wife and what he thinks of her. May agrees, but can only avoid Paula's later questions.

Paula stumbles upon a sketchbook filled with May's drawings of a naked man and a woman performing fellatio on him. She surmises the man is Darren, and shows the sketches to Bobby. He says it must be a fantasy but Paula suspects her mother is having an affair with Darren, and is angry.

After sex with May, Darren helps himself to medication in Helen's bathroom cabinet without caring what they are. May offers to pay for him to travel, with her, but then seeing his reluctant response says, 'what a silly idea'.

Paula invites her mother and Bruce on a double date with herself and Darren. May leaves when Paula makes a show of kissing Darren, and Bruce pursues her. He takes her home and rapes her. May goes to Paula's but finds no comfort as Paula is pleased to think her mother and Bruce were probably intimate. Paula tells May that she has given Darren an ultimatum to leave his wife by the following day, and, expecting that he will, tells May that she must leave.

Bobby tells Darren he must finish the conservatory or leave as he has a deadline and wants to sell the house. Darren is disillusioned and frustrated by his life and his lack of autonomy and fights with May, seeking to assert himself by making May perform fellatio on him. May wants to please Darren but is reluctant because he is being rough and aggressive. Things only become worse when May reveals that the financial "help" she had earlier promised him would be a plane ticket, to allow them to travel together, rather than cash as he had been anticipating. Darren loses his temper and insults her, before proceeding to smash up the conservatory he had been working on for Bobby.

Later, Paula tells her mother that what might make her feel better would be to hit her. May agrees and Paula punches May in the face, calling her a whοrе. They visit Bobby's house where Helen is showing an estate agent round, and Darren is busy repairing the conservatory with Bobby. May has a black eye that she explains as an argument and says she 'got the message', before saying goodbye to everyone, refusing a lift to the station and preferring to leave alone.

May returns home, but only long enough to collect her passport, before walking away with her suitcase, sketchbooks and passport in hand.

== Cast ==
- Anne Reid as May, Bobby and Paula's mother, Toots' widow
- Daniel Craig as Darren, Bobby's friend and Paula's lover, a skilled carpenter
- Peter Vaughan as Toots, May's husband and Bobby and Paula's father
- Danira Gović as Au Pair
- Steven Mackintosh as Bobby, son of May and Toots, and brother to Paula
- Cathryn Bradshaw as Paula, daughter of May and Toots, and sister to Bobby
- Anna Wilson-Jones as Helen, Bobby's wife
- Oliver Ford Davies as Bruce, an older man, May's date
- Harry Michell as Harry, Bobby and Helen's son
- Rosie Michell as Rosie, Bobby and Helen's daughter

== Production ==
Anne Reid revealed that she was so anxious at the prospect of filming sex scenes with Daniel Craig that on the night before the scenes were to be filmed, she got drunk and then burst into tears. Said Reid, "I rang my son and I was weeping and he said, ‘Look Mum, it’s a great part, if you’re inhibited it’s not going to work so just go for it'".

== Critical reception ==
On review aggregate website Rotten Tomatoes, The Mother has a score of 78% based on 91 reviews. The site's critics consensus reads, "Reid gives a fearless, realistic performance in depicting an older woman's sexual blossoming." On Metacritic, the film has a score of 72 based on 27 reviews.

Stephen Holden of The New York Times called Reid "achingly believable" and said Craig brings an "undertone of volatile macho arrogance seething below a cultivated surface". Holden opined The Mother is better than Roger Michell's two best-known films, Notting Hill and Changing Lanes, and that "screenwriter Hanif Kureishi's even-handed view of the characters' frustrations and fantasies is infused with an unwavering Chekhovian compassion". With its centring on an older woman and a younger man, the film also received comparisons to Rainer Werner Fassbinder's Ali: Fear Eats the Soul.

Critic Roger Ebert gave the film three and a half out of four and praised the performances of Reid, Craig, and Bradshaw. He concluded, "By the end, 'The Mother' has told us all we need to know about the characters, except how to feel about them. It shows how people play a role and grow comfortable with it, and how that role is confused with the real person inside. And then it shows the person inside, frightened and pitiful and fighting for survival. I have a lot of questions about what happens in this movie. I am intended to."

Peter Bradshaw of The Guardian was more critical. Though he lauded Reid and Craig's performances as well as the film's opening sequence, he called the film a "contrived and self-important drama". The film's third act was also criticised as descending into melodrama.

Filmmaker John Waters named the film one of the ten best of 2004.

== Awards and honours ==
=== Wins ===
- 2004 London Critics Circle Film Awards

ALFS Award - Anne Reid

=== Nominations ===
- 2004 BAFTA Awards

BAFTA Film Award - Anne Reid

- 2004 British Independent Film Award - Anne Reid
- 2004 Cinemanila International Film Festival

Lino Brocka Award - Roger Michell

- European Film Awards

2004 Audience Award - Daniel Craig and Anne Reid
2003 European Film Award - Anne Reid and Hanif Kureishi

- 2004 London Critics Circle Film Awards

ALFS Award - Daniel Craig, Hanif Kureishi, Film of the Year

- 2004 Shanghai International Film Festival

Golden Goblet - Roger Michell

== Home media ==
Sony Home Entertainment released The Mother on DVD on October 12, 2004. The release includes a commentary track by director Roger Michell and producer Kevin Loader.
