= Days Like These (TV series) =

- Created by: Bonnie Turner Terry Turner; Mark Brazill; Caryn Mandabach; Linda Wallem
- Directed by: Bob Spiers
- Starring: Max Wrottesley; Trevor Cooper; Ann Bryson; Rosie Marcel; Steve Steen; Sara Stockbridge; Harry Peacock; James Carlton; Emma Pierson; Jamie Beck
- Music by: Graham Jarvis
- Opening theme: "Days Like These" by Asia
- Country of origin: United Kingdom
- Original language: English
- No. of series: 1
- No. of episodes: 13

Production
- Executive producers: Marcy Carsey; Caryn Mandabach; Tom Werner; Linda Wallem
- Producer: John Bartlett
- Camera setup: Multi-camera
- Running time: 21 minutes
- Production company: The Carsey-Werner Company

Original release
- Network: ITV
- Release: 12 February – 14 July 1999

Related
- That '70s Show

Days Like These is a British television remake of the American sitcom That '70s Show. Directed by Bob Spiers, it was broadcast Fridays at 8.30 pm on ITV in 1999 and used many of the same names (Eric Forman, Kitty Forman), or slight alterations (Donna Palmer instead of Donna Pinciotti, Jackie Burget instead of Jackie Burkhart, etc.). It was set in the real-life town of Luton, England, in the 1970s. It was cancelled after six episodes and only 10 of the 13 produced episodes were aired, although the entire series was eventually aired in a very late night weeknight slot.

== Cast ==
- Max Wrottesley as Eric Forman
- Trevor Cooper as Ron Forman (Red Forman)
- Ann Bryson as Kitty Forman
- Rosie Marcel as Donna Palmer (Donna Pinciotti)
- Steve Steen as Bob Palmer (Bob Pinciotti)
- Sara Stockbridge as Midge Palmer (Midge Pinciotti)
- Harry Peacock as Dylan Jones (Steven Hyde)
- James Carlton as Michael McGuire (Michael Kelso)
- Emma Pierson as Jackie Burget (Jackie Burkhart)
- Jamie Beck as Torbjørn Rasmussen (Fez)
