= Max Beesley =

British actor and musician

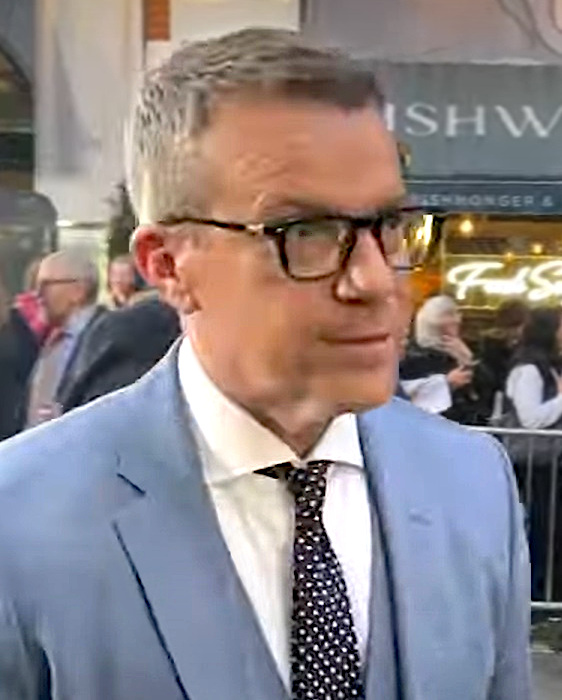
- Beesley at The Gentlemen premiere 2024
- Born: Maxton Gig Beesley Jr. 16 April 1971 (age 55); Burnage, Manchester, England
- Education: Guildhall School of Music and Drama
- Occupations: Actor; musician; writer; producer; director; composer
- Years active: 1983–present
- Spouse: Jennifer Noelle
- Children: 2

Maxton Gig Beesley Jr. (born 16 April 1971) is an English actor and musician. His television and film credits include The History of Tom Jones, a Foundling (1997), The Match (1999), Hotel (2001), Kill Me Later (2001), The Last Minute (2001), Bodies (2004–2006), The Last Enemy (2008), Survivors (2008–2010), Mad Dogs (2011–2013), Suits (2013), Empire (2015–2016), Ordinary Lies (2015), Jamestown (2017–2019), The Outsider (2020), The Midwich Cuckoos (2022), Operation Fortune (2023) and Hijack (2023–present). In 2024, he appeared as boxing promoter Henry Collins in Guy Ritchie's The Gentlemen (2024).

== Early life ==
Beesley was born on 16 April 1971 in Burnage, Manchester. His father, Maxton Beesley Sr, is a professional jazz drummer and actor, and his mother was a jazz singer who performed under the stage name Chris Marlowe. He has a step-brother, Jason Milligan, who is also an actor. His middle name was inspired by the American actor Gig Young.

Beesley has studied at the Chetham's School of Music, and at the Guildhall School of Music and Drama. Beesley is an advocate for method acting, being tutored by Sheila Gray, owner of the independent acting studio in Manhattan.

== Career ==
=== Acting ===
Beesley came to prominence with his first major acting role in BBC's The History of Tom Jones, a Foundling, a 1997 television mini-series based on the book of the same name. In 1999, he played the lead role of Wullie Smith, in the Scottish comedy film The Match, working with Isla Blair, Samantha Fox and Richard E Grant.

In 2001, he played a bank robber in the film Kill Me Later, alongside Selma Blair. The same year, he starred as Antonio in Mike Figgis' movie Hotel. In 2004, he starred in the ethics challenging BBC Three dark medical drama Bodies, which ran until 2006, and won best drama at the Royal Television Society awards. In 2006, he starred as Charlie, the hotel Deputy Manager in the BBC One series Hotel Babylon.

In June 2007, Beesley starred in the ITV series Talk to Me. He also starred in the film Red Roses and Petrol, alongside Malcolm McDowell, and in the BBC One thriller The Last Enemy, with Benedict Cumberbatch and Robert Carlyle. In October 2008, he was one of the lead characters in BBC One's remake of the 1970s drama Survivors, as remorseless former criminal Tom Price. The series consisted of six episodes, with a second series of six episodes transmitted in January 2010. He starred in the ITV drama The Reckoning in April 2011. Beesley gained more exposure with American audiences with a recurring role on Suits, in 2013 and from October 2015 with another recurring role, this time in the US spy drama Homeland, opposite Claire Danes, as ex-British special forces bodyguard Mike Brown. From 2016 to 2018 he starred in Jamestown as Henry Sharrow, depicting the first English settlers to colonise Virginia in 1609.

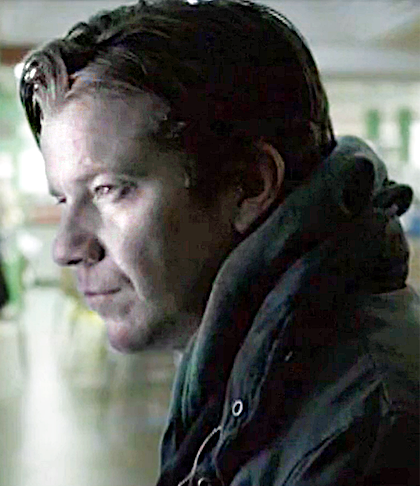
Beesley in The Reckoning in 2011

He was cast as Seale Bolton in The Outsider on HBO in June 2019, which aired from January 2020. In 2021, he starred as Ben Harris in Operation Fortune: Ruse de Guerre, opposite Jason Statham. 2021 also saw him return to television, starring in The Midwich Cuckoos opposite Keeley Hawes for Sky TV. In 2022, Beesley joined the cast of Hijack for Apple TV opposite Idris Elba and Neil Maskell.

In 2024, he starred as boxing promoter Henry Collins in Guy Ritchie's The Gentleman for Netflix, alongside Theo James, Kaya Scodelario, and Ray Winstone.

=== Voice and advertising ===
Beesley is also a voice over artist and has worked for multiple TV advertisements and documentaries including ITV, NFU Mutual's insurance, Energizer's lithium batteries, and PC World. He also provided the voiceover for Manchester United's season review DVD. He appeared in a TV campaign for the UK recruitment company Jobsite, and was also featured on their homepage.

=== Music ===
Beesley is also a session musician, and solo artist, having had a successful career before becoming an actor. He was a chorister at Manchester Cathedral and studied at Chetham's School of Music. He also studied percussion and classical piano at the Guildhall School of Music & Drama with soul singer Omar and toured with the Brand New Heavies on keyboards and percussion. He has also toured or recorded with George Benson, Earth, Wind & Fire, Stevie Wonder, The JB's and Zero 7. He is also a vibraphone player.

Beesley has performed in concert as a percussionist and pianist for Robbie Williams, Take That, Jamiroquai, and the Paul Weller Movement. He played percussion and piano at Williams' Knebworth gigs in summer 2003 and at Hyde Park for Live 8 London. Williams' first concert of his Close Encounters Tour in Perth on 30 November 2006 saw Beesley as percussionist for the second half of the show. He also played drums during the performance of "Rudebox" at Williams' second Brisbane concert and during a BBC Electric Proms show.

In 1989, at the age of 18, his first ever boss was Paul Weller. In 1993, Beesley was a member of the jazz band Incognito, but in 1994, after an eight-month tour with them, decided to end his music career and start acting. On 28 October 2006, Beesley appeared as a special guest pianist for James Brown during his performance at the Roundhouse in London as part of the BBC's Electric Proms festival. In 2020, he recorded his first solo album titled Groove Spectrum at Capitol Studios in Los Angeles with Grammy-winning producer/mixer Al Schmitt mixing the album. It features Paul Weller, Robbie Williams, Fred Durst, Lisa Stansfield, jazz pianist Christian Sands, Tommy Blaize, Antonique Smith, John Turrell, Omar, and Francci Richards. A multi-instrumentalist, Beesley wrote, played, and scored the album.

He recorded his first solo instrumental album Zeus in January 2023 in Los Angeles with luminaries Steve Gadd, Walt Fowler, Christian Sands, Dean Parks, Luis Conte, and producing collaborator Jerry Meehan on bass. The album will be released towards the end of 2023 through Legere Records and features the vibraphone, one of the instruments Beesley is mainly associated with. He wrote, arranged, mixed, and produced the album under his "Max Beesley's HIGH VIBES" banner, and will tour the record in 2024 in both Europe and Japan. Critics cite the record as being heavily influenced by the music of Herbie Hancock, The Brecker Brothers, and vibraphonist Roy Ayers.

== Filmography ==
Key
| † | Denotes projects that have not yet been released |

=== Film ===
| Year | Title | Role | Notes | Ref. |
|---|---|---|---|---|
| 1999 | The Match | Wullie Smith | | |
| 2000 | It Was an Accident | Mickey Cousins | | |
| 2000 | Five Seconds to Spare | William | | |
| 2001 | Kill Me Later | Charlie Anders | | |
| 2001 | The Last Minute | Billy Byrne | | |
| 2001 | Hotel | Antonio | | |
| 2001 | Glitter | Julian "Dice" Black | | |
| 2002 | Anita and Me | Hairy Neddy | | |
| 2003 | The Emperor's Wife | Emperor | | |
| 2003 | Red Roses and Petrol | Johnny Doyle | | |
| 2004 | Torque | Luther | | |
| 2005 | Her Name Is Carla | Jack | | |
| 2013 | Pawn | Billy | | |
| 2019 | Married Young | Jake | | |
| 2019 | Line of Descent | Commissioner Bates | | |
| 2023 | Operation Fortune: Ruse de Guerre | Ben Harris | | |
| 2026 | Jack Ryan: Ghost War | Liam Crown | | |
| TBA | Deville † | A. Bell | Filming | |

=== Television ===
| Year | Title | Role | Notes | Ref. |
|---|---|---|---|---|
| 1987 | Last of the Summer Wine | Passerby | Episode: "Who's Feeling Ejected Then?" | |
| 1996 | Thief Takers | Kitson | Episode: "Déjà Vu" | |
| 1997 | The Broker's Man | Joe Goodwin | Episode: "Dangerous Bends" | |
| 1997 | The History of Tom Jones: a Foundling | Tom Jones | Miniseries; 5 episodes | |
| 2002 | Fields of Gold | Mark Hurst | Miniseries; 2 episodes | |
| 2004–2006 | Bodies | Rob Lake | Series regular; 17 episodes | |
| 2005 | Bloodlines | DC Jake Bannerman | Miniseries; 2 episodes | |
| 2005 | Hustle | Jake Henry | Episode: "Old Acquaintance" | |
| 2006 | Goldplated | Charity MC | Episode: "The Charity Dinner" | |
| 2006–2009 | Hotel Babylon | Charlie Edwards | Series regular; 22 episodes | |
| 2007 | Talk to Me | Mitch Moore | Miniseries; 4 episodes | |
| 2008 | The Last Enemy | Michael Ezard | Miniseries; 5 episodes | |
| 2008–2010 | Survivors | Tom Price | Series regular; 12 episodes | |
| 2010 | CSI: Crime Scene Investigation | Thomas Stewart | Episode: "Blood Moon" | |
| 2011 | The Reckoning | Mark Dobson | Miniseries; 2 episodes | |
| 2011–2013 | Mad Dogs | Steve "Woody" Woods | Series regular; 14 episodes | |
| 2013 | Suits | Stephen Huntley | Recurring role; 7 episodes | |
| 2015 | Ordinary Lies | Mike Hill | Series regular; 6 episodes | |
| 2015 | Strike Back | Ray McQueen | Episode: "Legacy" | |
| 2015 | Homeland | Mike Brown | Episode: "The Tradition of Hospitality" | |
| 2015–2016 | Empire | Guy | Recurring role; 3 episodes | |
| 2017–2019 | Jamestown | Henry Sharrow | Series regular; 24 episodes | |
| 2019 | Flack | Anthony Henderson | Episode: "Anthony" | |
| 2020 | The Outsider | Seale Bolton | Recurring role; 3 episodes | |
| 2022 | The Midwich Cuckoos | Paul Haynes | Series regular; 7 episodes | |
| 2023–present | Hijack | DI Daniel O'Farrel | Series regular; 13 episodes | |
| 2024 | The Gentlemen | Henry Collins | Recurring role; 3 episodes | |
| 2025 | Suspect: The Shooting of Jean Charles de Menezes | Andy Hayman | Miniseries; 4 episodes | |
