= The Reckoning (2011 TV series) =

- Genre: Crime drama
- Written by: Chris Lang
- Directed by: Jim O'Hanlon
- Starring: Ashley Jensen; Max Beesley; Sophie Stuckey; Jams Thomas; Daniel Ryan; Jane Perry; Aidan McArdle; Peter Wight
- Composer: Samuel Sim
- Country of origin: United Kingdom
- Original language: English
- No. of series: 1
- No. of episodes: 2

Production
- Executive producers: Jeremy Gwilt; Chris Lang
- Producer: Kit Williams
- Production locations: London, England, UK
- Running time: 60 minutes
- Production company: TXTV

Original release
- Network: ITV
- Release: 18 April – 19 April 2011

The Reckoning is a British television drama starring Ashley Jensen and Max Beesley. It was broadcast in two parts by ITV on 18 and 19 April 2011.

== Plot ==
Sally Wilson, a single mother, has been bequeathed £5 million, but she must kill a man in order to get the money. Sally doesn't know what to do and confides in her ex-policeman boyfriend Mark, now a security guard.

== Cast ==
- Ashley Jensen as Sally Wilson
- Max Beesley as Mark Dobson
