= The Stork Club (book) =

2006 book by Imogen Edwards-Jones

- Author: Imogen Edwards-Jones
- Language: English
- Genre: Non-fiction, Biography
- Published: 2006 Bantam Press
- Publication place: United Kingdom
- Media type: Print, Hardback
- Preceded by: Air Babylon
- Followed by: Fashion Babylon

The Stork Club (ISBN 0593056086) is a 2006 book by British author and journalist Imogen Edwards-Jones. The book, based on the author’s Daily Telegraph column "Shall I Be a Mother?", is an autobiographical account of Edward-Jones’ attempts to conceive. The book outlines Imogen Edwards-Jones’ treatment by IVF.
