= The Time of Your Life (TV series) =

Television series

- Genre: Drama
- Written by: Charlie Martin (also creator); Jan McVerry; Julie Rutterford; Andrew Payne
- Directed by: David Blair
- Starring: Genevieve O'Reilly
- Composer: Stephen McKeon
- Country of origin: United Kingdom
- Original language: English
- No. of series: 1
- No. of episodes: 6

Production
- Producers: Julie Clark; Charles Elton; Barney Reisz
- Running time: 60 minutes (including adverts)
- Production company: ITV Productions

Original release
- Network: ITV
- Release: 18 June – 23 July 2007

The Time of Your Life is a British television series made by ITV Productions for ITV, and aired in the summer of 2007.

== Cast ==
- Genevieve O'Reilly as Kate
- Anna Wilson-Jones as Sally
- Geraldine James as Eileen
- Robert Pugh as Toby
- Olivia Colman as Amanda
- Joe Duttine as Joe
- Mark Bazeley as Pete
- Jemima Rooper as Emma
- Augustus Prew as Dexter
- David Westhead as Dave
- Victoria Hamilton as Esther

== Synopsis ==
The drama series tells the story of Kate (portrayed by Genevieve O'Reilly) who has awoken from an 18-year coma to find the world that she once knew has slipped away.

Initially she is unable to come to terms with the fact her parents are older and her friends look so different, but as the weeks go by she adjusts to a world with the internet, mobile phones and global companies. Kate is also shocked by her friends, especially Sally (Anna Wilson-Jones), with whom she briefly lives. She also is unaware that her parents were on the verge of divorce when she woke. For their part, Eileen (Geraldine James) and Toby (Robert Pugh) are pretending nothing was awry.

However, Kate's life will never be resolved until she discovers the truth of why she was assaulted at the school leaving party 18 years previously. All her friends seem to have reasons why they want to forget that night. Kate needs to know why she survived and her fellow school pupil Brian Wellings was killed. Brian's father, Jack, follows Kate to try and discover the truth.

The series also stars Olivia Colman, who plays Amanda, one of Kate's childhood friends who has married her teacher, Joe Duttine, playing Joe, who had a crush on Kate when they were younger and Mark Bazeley as Pete, Kate's childhood sweetheart, who has become a successful businessman, with a fiancée, Emma (Jemima Rooper).

Kate later ends up together with Amanda's son Dexter (Augustus Prew).

The series aired on the Seven Network in Australia between August and October 2007.
