= SunTrap =

- Also known as: Woody (working title)
- Genre: Sitcom
- Created by: Neil Webster; Charlie Skelton
- Written by: Neil Webster; Charlie Skelton
- Starring: Kayvan Novak; Bradley Walsh; Emma Pierson; Jamie Demetriou
- Opening theme: "Stone Cold Sober" by Paloma Faith
- Composer: Todd Kinnon (uncredited)
- Country of origin: United Kingdom
- Original language: English
- No. of series: 1
- No. of episodes: 6

Production
- Production location: Gran Canaria
- Running time: 30 minutes
- Production company: Happy Tramp Productions

Original release
- Network: BBC One
- Release: 27 May – 1 July 2015

SunTrap is a British television sitcom produced by Happy Tramp Productions for the BBC. The series was created and written by Neil Webster and Charlie Skelton. The storyline follows Woody (Kayvan Novak), an undercover journalist who is a master of disguises but forced to go on the run after an undercover plot is foiled by his corrupt editor. He escapes to a Spanish island where his former mentor Brutus (Bradley Walsh) is now living and running a bar. Initially not pleased to see his protégé, Brutus realises that by letting Woody solve investigations, using a variety of disguises, he can make a profit.

The series was filmed entirely in Gran Canaria with El Faro bar in Puerto de Mogán standing in for Brutus' bar. For the first series six episodes were produced to air on BBC One and the initial one was broadcast on 27 May 2015. The show was not renewed for a second series following negative reviews.

== Episode list ==
| No. | Title | Directed by | Written by | Original release date |
|---|---|---|---|---|
| 1 | "Look Who's Talking" | Ben Palmer | Charlie Skelton; Neil Webster | 27 May 2015 |
| 2 | "In the Line of Fire" | Ben Palmer | Charlie Skelton; Neil Webster | 3 June 2015 |
| 3 | "The Big Sleep" | Ben Palmer | Charlie Skelton; Neil Webster | 10 June 2015 |
| 4 | "Casino" | Ben Palmer | Charlie Skelton; Neil Webster | 17 June 2015 |
| 5 | "The Usual Suspects" | Ben Palmer | Charlie Skelton; Neil Webster | 24 June 2015 |
| 6 | "Overboard" | Ben Palmer | Charlie Skelton; Neil Webster | 1 July 2015 |

== Regular cast ==
- Kayvan Novak as Woody
- Bradley Walsh as Brutus
- Emma Pierson as Melody
- Jamie Demetriou as Zorro
- Diana Payan as Lorenza
- Keith Allen as Señor Big
- Alan Williams as Donald
- Bea Segura as Captain Carmelita
- Bill Holland as Sergeant Juan
