= Bloodlines (TV series) =

British two-part TV drama

- DVD cover
- Created by: Mike Cullen
- Directed by: Philip Martin
- Starring: Emma Pierson; Kevin McNally; Robert Pugh; Kieran O'Brien; Max Beesley
- Composer: Nicholas Hooper
- Country of origin: United Kingdom
- Original language: English
- No. of series: 1
- No. of episodes: 2

Production
- Executive producer: Andy Harries
- Producer: Shefali Malhoutra
- Production locations: London, England, UK
- Cinematography: Julian Court
- Running time: 90 mins each. (w/advertisements)
- Production company: Granada Television

Original release
- Network: ITV
- Release: 31 January – 1 February 2005

Bloodlines is a two-episode British detective fiction thriller starring Emma Pierson as rookie police officer Justine Hopkin. The series, produced by Granada Television and directed by Philip Martin, premiered on ITV on 31 January 2005 at 9 PM, with episode two airing on 1 February 2005, again at 9 PM. Episodes one and two are each 90 minutes in length. Initially envisioned as returning series, ITV chose not to recommission Bloodlines after viewing figures fell well below the expected target.

== Plot ==
After Elaine Hopkin (Jan Francis) is found dead, the victim of an apparent suicide, her firstborn Mark (Kieran O'Brien) refuses to inform his father James (Kevin McNally) who is locked up for murder. Sister Justine (Emma Pierson), a police officer, goes to visit him, only to learn he has just been released. After the autopsy concludes asphyxiation, she compromises DC Jake Bannerman (Max Beesley)'s official investigation by taking actions against procedure.

== Cast ==
- Emma Pierson as P.C. Justine Hopkin
- Kevin McNally as James Hopkin
- Robert Pugh as D.C.I. Paul Jordan
- Max Beesley as D.C. Jake Bannerman
- Kieran O'Brien as Mark Hopkin
- Andy Rashleigh as D.I. Derek Thompson
- Jan Francis as Elaine Hopkin

== Episodes ==
No.	Title	Directed by	Written by	Original release date	UK viewers (millions)
1	"Episode 1"	Phillip Martin	Mike Cullen	31 January 2005	5.67m
WPC Justine Hopkin finds her mother dead at her home. She decides to visit her estranged father James in prison to break the news, but learns that he has already been released. The post mortem shows her mother was murdered, and James is the prime suspect. Justine tracks James down at his old haunts, but he protests his innocence. Her boss and mentor DCI Jordan orders her not to interfere in the investigation. Justine meets with her father's former colleague, DI Derek Thompson, hoping to find new information on the case that resulted in her father’s wrongful conviction for murder. She catches Thompson on film with a prostitute and threatens him with blackmail unless he helps her clear her father’s name. But then she finds Thompson murdered.
2	"Episode 2"	Phillip Martin	Mike Cullen	1 February 2005	4.41m
Justine asks her brother Mark to provide an alibi for her after the meeting with DI Derek Thompson goes horribly wrong. Once again, the evidence points to James Hopkin. DCI Paul Jordan loses patience with Justine when she continues to defend her father and points the finger at Jordan himself, knowing he was close to her father when the original murder was committed. DC Jake Bannerman and DCI Jordan enlist Mark in the hunt for the elusive James. Unlike his sister, Mark is not convinced of his father’s innocence. Taking matters into her own hands, Justine forces a meeting between her father and the father of Charles Cole, the man Hopkin was convicted of murdering, but the meeting triggers a series of tragic events.
