= Material Girl (TV series) =

- Genre: Romantic comedy Drama
- Written by: Joshua St.Johnston; Colin Bytheway; Ben Ockrent; Imogen Edwards-Jones; Jess Williams
- Starring: Lenora Crichlow; Dervla Kirwan; Michael Landes
- Country of origin: United Kingdom
- Original language: English
- No. of seasons: 1
- No. of episodes: 6

Production
- Producer: Chrissy Skinns
- Running time: 60 minutes
- Production company: Carnival Film & Television

Original release
- Network: BBC One
- Release: 14 January – 18 February 2010

Material Girl is a British romantic comedy produced by Carnival Films, that first aired on BBC One on 14 January 2010. It stars Lenora Crichlow, Dervla Kirwan, and Michael Landes.

Set in the fashion world, it was inspired by the book Fashion Babylon by Imogen Edwards-Jones. It was described in one of the early promotional items as "a romantic comedy about a young fashion designer battling an evil ex-boss, a sexy-but-devilish business partner and snobby fashionistas to get her break in work and love".

== Cast ==
- Lenora Crichlow as Ali Redcliffe, a young fashion designer attempting to make a name for herself
- Dervla Kirwan as Davina Bailey, the current hot designer, who is not about to allow an upstart like Ali take her spotlight
- Michael Landes as Marco Keriliak, fashion businessman, Ali's business partner
- O. T. Fagbenle as Chris, motorcycle courier and Ali's ex-boyfriend
- Nick Blood as Alex, Davina's fashion assistant, Ali's friend and gay flatmate
- Ingrid Oliver as Mimi Throckmorton, Ali's friend, stockist at a fashion magazine-cum stylist
- Anna Brewster as Lydia Kane, supermodel and Ali's friend
- Esther Smith as Trish, Ali's studio receptionist
- Joanna Kanska as Dorota, Ali's studio dressmaker
- Malcolm Sinclair as Mitchell Crompton, leading fashion critic
- Sadie Pickering as Louise, works for fashion magazine
- Lindsey Coulson as Christina Redcliffe, Ali's mother
- Anthony Calf as Anthony Chatsworth, an influential fashion magazine editor, had affair with Mimi
- Charlie Carter as Paparazzi, stitches up Lydia Kane for Mitchell

== Episodes ==
No.	Title	Directed by	Written by	Original release date	UK viewers (millions)
1	"Episode 1"	Cilla Ware	Joshua St Johnston	14 January 2010	3
2	"Episode 2"	Cilla Ware	Colin Bytheway	21 January 2010	2.8
3	"Episode 3"	Sarah O'Gorman	Ben Ockrent	28 January 2010	2.6
4	"Episode 4"	Sarah O'Gorman	Imogen Edwards-Jones	4 February 2010	2.4
5	"Episode 5"	Philip John	Jess Williams	11 February 2010	2.58
6	"Episode 6"	Philip John	Colin Bytheway	18 February 2010	1.4

== Reception ==
The first episode gained 3 million viewers with a 12% audience share, which fell to 2.6 million (11% share) for the third episode.

Critical reviews of the series based on the pilot were mixed, with the London Evening Standard calling it a "jaw-droppingly, buttock-clenchingly dreadful pieces of television". Reviewing the first episode for The Guardian, Sam Wollaston said: "OK, it's silly and deeply shallow. It's also gorgeous, fizzy, bitchy, self-indulgent, obviously bad for you but dangerously addictive. Careful, Material Girl could become a habit."

== DVD release ==
The first series was released in the United Kingdom on DVD on 22 February 2010.
