= Danira Gović =

Croatian actress (born 1973)

- Born: Danira Gović; 1972 (age 53–54); Šibenik, SR Croatia, SFR Yugoslavia (now Croatia)
- Occupation: Actress
- Years active: 2002–present
- Relatives: Drazen Govic

Danira Gović (also billed as Danira Govich; born (billed 1972/1973)) is a Croatian actress, best known for a recurring role in the British television comedy-drama series Hotel Babylon.

== Biography ==
After having finished her education in a secondary economic school in her native city of Šibenik, Danira arrived in London in 1993, where she initially worked as a babysitter.

Her temporary job turned into a permanent residence in Britain. After babysitting, she worked for a while in a store, selling bras, and then she got a waitressing job in London's Royal National Theatre, where she observed various actors and plays. She went to an audition and got accepted, gaining a scholarship to cover her costs of education.

After many tries, she was in the right place at the right time: she got a role in BBC series Hotel Babylon, playing Croatian chambermaid Tanja Mihajlov and then she got promoted to Head of Housekeeping after former Head of Housekeeping Jackie Clunes played by Natalie Mendoza left.

She has also played a noticed role in Zabranjena ljubav, on RTL Televizija in Croatia, as Angelina, a reticent hairdresser.

== Filmography ==
=== Film roles ===
Film
Year	Title	Role	Notes
2003	The Mother	Au Pair	Playing with Anne Reid and Daniel Craig
2004	Sex Traffic	Croatian Girl	British television film

=== Television roles ===
Film
Year	Title	Role	Notes
2002	Manchild	Karina	British TV-series
2006-2009	Hotel Babylon	Tanja Mihajlov	British TV-series (one of the main roles)
2007-2008	Forbidden Love	Angelina	Croatian TV-series
2010	Mamutica	Irena Grgić	Croatian crime drama series
2011-2012	Loza	Tonka	Croatian telenovela
2016	Winnetou & Old Shatterhand	Wife Tadeusz	German TV Miniseries
2018	Rest In Peace	Anita Bajic	TV series
2020	Novine	Lijecnica Mandic	TV series
2022	Metropolitanci	Lidija Cvirn	TV series
