= Anthony Barclay =

British actor

- Occupation: Actor
- Years active: 1992–present
- Known for: Judge John Deed, Common as Muck, New Tricks
- Spouses: Doon Mackichan (m. 1997; div. 2005): Antonia Fiber-Barclay
- Children: 4

Anthony Barclay is an English actor. He has appeared in productions including Kevin Costner presents: The First Christmas for ABC/ Disney, Foundation for Apple TV, Colosseum for History, Domina for Sky Atlantic, The Irregulars for Netflix, Britannia for Sky Atlantic and Common as Muck for the BBC. He played Anthony Berg in Shaun Severi's film Citizen versus Kane which won the Canal+ Award at Clermont Ferrand International Film Festival and which earned Barclay a Best Actor nomination.

Barclay is the son of Danny Williams, a 1960s balladeer best known for the song "Moon River" which got to No. 1 in 1961 before going on to have hits in both the UK and the US.

Barclay has three children with former wife Doon Mackichan and one child with current wife, Antonia Fiber-Barclay.

== Career highlights ==
He played Young Buddy in Stephen Sondheim's Follies in the West End, and worked again with Sondheim as The Balladeer in Sam Mendes' production of Assassins at London's Donmar Warehouse. Notable roles in theatre include: Aziz in Sasha Wares production of Timberlake Wertenbaker's Credible Witness at The Royal Court alongside actress Olympia Dukakis; Hogarth in The Iron Man by Ted Hughes and Pete Townsend at The Young Vic Theatre; Feste in Lucy Bailey's production of Twelfth Night at The Royal Exchange; Agamemnon in The Iphigenia Quartet at The Gate Theatre, London and Japheth in John Caird and Stephen Schwartz's production of the musical Children of Eden in London's West End.

Television appearances include: Kevin Costner presents: The First Christmas as King Herod, Foundation (season 2) as Councilor Sutt, Domina as the character Corvinus, Britannia (season 2) as Josephus the Levantine a.k.a. The Traveller, Jesus: His Life as Herod Antipas, Carla Lane's Screaming as Florian, Common as Muck as Sunil, Coronation Street as Karl Harper, Judge John Deed as Sir Tim Listfield and in New Tricks as Carlos Alvarez.

Barclay spent 2010-13 working with Steven Berkoff in Berkoff's Biblical Tales at the Hampstead Theatre; in Oedipus: After Sophocles at the Nottingham Playhouse, the Liverpool Playhouse, the Pleasance Grand in Edinburgh and the Memminger Theatre in South Carolina for the Spoleto Festival, US; and Line-Up/Gas in the Steven Berkoff Season at the Jermyn Street Theatre in London; notable because Berkoff was one of the main inspirations for Barclay as a young actor after he saw Berkoff's production of West at the Donmar Warehouse.
