= Beast (TV series) =

- Genre: Sitcom
- Created by: Simon Nye
- Directed by: Martin Dennis
- Starring: Alexander Armstrong; Doon Mackichan; Sylvestra Le Touzel; Steven Alvey; Emma Pierson
- Country of origin: United Kingdom
- Original language: English
- No. of series: 2
- No. of episodes: 12

Production
- Running time: 30 minutes

Original release
- Network: BBC One
- Release: 13 January 2000 – 10 February 2001

Beast is a BBC One sitcom based in a veterinary surgery. Two series of six episodes each were made, with the first broadcast in early 2000 and the second in 2001. Set in Gloucestershire, the sitcom centres around Nick (Alexander Armstrong), a country vet who has a strong dislike of most animals, particarly guinea pigs. Stuck in his dead-end job, he has inherited the ownership of the practise from his father. He also has poor interpersonal skills and these tend alienate people, particularly the young female owners of his patients. Armstrong notes "the only reason he stays being a vet is because he can meet some foxy bird." His receptionist/ manager Kirsten (Doon Mackichan) is only person who keeps his sanity at bay, whom is also a close friend and ally. His colleagues and fellow vets include the priggish and haughty Briony (Sylvestra Le Touzel), wet and dull Andrew (Steven Alvey) and Jade (Emma Pierson), the youngest member of staff, who is known for her eccentricites and odd behaviour.

Following the show's cancellation, subsequently in 2006, Fox network planned to produce a US version of the series. Emmy award-winning comedy writer and producer Tucker Cawley adapted Nye's script for the pilot episode.

== Cast and characters ==
- Alexander Armstrong as Nick, the lead character, a vet and owner of the practice which he inherited from his Father.
- Doon Mackichan as Kirsten, the practice manager.
- Sylvestra Le Touzel as Briony, the most experienced Vet at the practice.
- Steven Alvey as Andrew, the third and final vet at the practice.
- Emma Pierson as Jade, a trainee veterinary assistant.

== Episodes ==
=== Series 1 (2000) ===
No. overall	No. in series	Title	Original release date
1	1	"Juggling with Guinea Pigs"	13 January 2000
2	2	"The Love They Call Stalking"	20 January 2000
3	3	"Should We Hug?"	27 January 2000
4	4	"Frightening Shorts"	3 February 2000
5	5	"Twin Pekes"	10 February 2000
6	6	"Talking Dirty"	17 February 2000

=== Series 2 (2001) ===
No. overall	No. in series	Title	Original release date
7	1	"Cow"	6 January 2001
8	2	"Cat"	13 January 2001
9	3	"Pig"	20 January 2001
10	4	"Dogs"	27 January 2001
11	5	"Lamb"	3 February 2001
12	6	"Snake"	10 February 2001

== Home media ==
The complete series of Beast was released on region 2 DVD by Network on 17 March 2014.
