= Hotel (2001 film) =

2001 film by Mike Figgis

- Directed by: Mike Figgis
- Written by: Mike Figgis; Heathcote Williams
- Produced by: Andrea Calderwood; Mike Figgis; Annie Stewart; Lesley Stewart; Ernst Etchie Stroh
- Starring: Saffron Burrows; Salma Hayek; Lucy Liu; Burt Reynolds; Julian Sands; David Schwimmer
- Cinematography: Patrick Alexander Stewart
- Edited by: Adam Barton
- Music by: Mike Figgis; Anthony Marinelli
- Production companies: Moonstone Entertainment; Channel 4
- Distributed by: Metro-Goldwyn-Mayer; United Artists
- Release date: 12 September 2001
- Running time: 114 minutes
- Countries: Italy; United Kingdom
- Language: English
- Box office: $29,813

Hotel is a 2001 British-Italian comedy horror-thriller film co-written and directed by Mike Figgis. It stars Salma Hayek, Rhys Ifans, David Schwimmer, Lucy Liu, Burt Reynolds, and John Malkovich.

== Plot ==
While a British film crew are shooting a version of The Duchess of Malfi in Venice, they in turn are being filmed by a sleazy documentary primadonna while the strange hotel staff share meals which consist of human meat. The story expands to involve a hit man, a call girl and the Hollywood producer.

The film itself makes several mentions of the Dogme 95 style of film-making, and has been described as a "Dogme film-within-a-film."

== Cast ==
- Lucy Liu as Kawika
- John Malkovich as Omar Jonnson
- David Schwimmer as Jonathan Danderfine
- Saffron Burrows as Duchess of Malfi
- Salma Hayek as Charlee Boux
- Rhys Ifans as Trent Stoken
- Burt Reynolds as Flamenco Manager
- Julian Sands as Tour Guide
- Danny Huston as Hotel Clerk
- Max Beesley as Antonio
- Valentina Cervi as Hotel Maid
- Chiara Mastroianni as Hotel Nurse
- Andrea Di Stefano as Assassin
- Mark Strong as Ferdinand
- Danny Sapani as AJ
- Ornella Muti as Flamenco Spokesman
- Laura Morante as Greta

== Reception ==
The film was not a financial success and received mixed reviews. Roger Ebert noted this and pointed out the complex nature of the film:

Many critics have agreed that Hotel is not successful, but I would ask: Not successful at what? Before you conclude that a movie doesn't work, you have to determine what it intends to do. This is not a horror movie, a behind-the-scenes movie, a sexual intrigue or a travelogue, but all four at once, elbowing one another for screen time. It reminds me above all of a competitive series of jazz improvisations, in which the musicians quote from many sources and the joy comes in the way they're able to keep their many styles alive in the same song.... The movie has to be pointless in order to make any sense.

On the review aggregator website Rotten Tomatoes, 41% of 27 critics' reviews are positive, with an average rating of 4.9/10. The website's consensus reads: "Hotel earns a handful of points for sheer ambition, but they aren't enough to carry the movie over its steep pretensions."
