= Gladiatress =

- Directed by: Brian Grant
- Written by: Nick Whitby
- Produced by: Graham Broadbent; Justin Lin; Lawrence Bender
- Cinematography: Witold Stok
- Edited by: Fiona Colbeck
- Music by: James Seymour Brett
- Production companies: Mission Pictures; Stock Productions
- Distributed by: Icon Entertainment International; MGM Home Entertainment
- Release date: 2004
- Running time: 85 minutes
- Country: United Kingdom
- Language: English

Gladiatress is a 2004 British comedy film, starring Sally Phillips, Fiona Allen and Doon Mackichan. It is partly a parody of 2000's Gladiator.

== Plot ==
Three unlikely heroines Worthaboutapig (Sally Phillips), Dwyfuc (Doon Mackichan) and Smirgut the Fierce (Fiona Allen) set out to thwart a Roman invasion and save Celtic Britain.

== Cast ==
- Worthaboutapig – Sally Phillips
- Dwyfuc – Doon Mackichan
- Smirgut the Fierce – Fiona Allen
- General Rhinus – David Hayman
- Caesar – Ronan Vibert
- Jean Marcosivellauniviromandiboule – Philippe De Groussouvre
- Dubonet Warrior – Rory MacGregor
- Mrs Goatsplitter – Pam Ferris
- Welsh Suitor – Brendan O'Hea
- Chamberlain – William Chubb

== Filming ==
It was filmed at various locations in the UK between 11 November and 23 December 2002. Filming locations included the Bourne Woods and Frensham Ponds near Farnham in Surrey, Butser Ancient Farm in Hampshire, and West Wittering in West Sussex.

== Critical reception ==
Total Film gave the DVD release of Gladiatress one star out of five and described the film as "a painfully laugh-free vehicle for the usually talented stars of TV's Smack The Pony".
