= Imogen Edwards-Jones =

British writer, author and journalist

- Born: Birmingham, England
- Education: Malvern Girls' College; University of Bristol; City University London
- Occupation: Journalist
- Years active: 1990s–present
- Known for: author, journalist, writer, broadcaster
- Website: www.imogenedwardsjones.com

Imogen Edwards-Jones (born June 1968, in Birmingham) is a British writer, author and journalist, who blogs for doyoutravel.com and Get the Gloss.

== Biography ==
Edwards-Jones was educated at Malvern Girls' College, a boarding independent school in the spa town of Malvern in Worcestershire, which merged with another school in 2006 to form Malvern St James School, followed by the University of Bristol, where she gained a degree in Russian, and then City University London.

Edwards-Jones is best known for the Babylon series of exposés based on her 2004 book, Hotel Babylon from an insider's view of the non-stop world of the hotel staff and guests alike.

In 2006, Edwards-Jones had a regular column in The Daily Telegraph, detailing her attempts at IVF which resulted in the birth of her daughter. She blogs for doyoutravel.com and Get the Gloss.

Edwards-Jones is married to the BBC's Creative Head of Comedy Talent, Kenton Allen. Candace Bushnell is her daughter's godmother.

== Works ==
=== Babylon series ===
- Hotel Babylon (2004, with "anonymous", see also BBC series Hotel Babylon based on this book)
- Air Babylon (2005, with "anonymous", in development by Carnival Films for television)
- Fashion Babylon (2006, with "anonymous", see also BBC series Material Girl loosely based on this book)
- Beach Babylon (2007, with "anonymous")
- Pop Babylon (2008, with "anonymous")
- Wedding Babylon (2009, with "anonymous")
- Hospital Babylon (2011, with "anonymous")
- Restaurant Babylon (2012, with "anonymous")

=== Other books ===
- The Taming of Eagles: Exploring the New Russia (1993) (with Joth Shakerley)
- My Canapé Hell (2000)
- Big Night Out (2002) (with Jessica Adams, Maggie Alderson and Nick Earls)
- Shagpile (2002)
- The Wendy House (2003)
- Tuscany for Beginners (2004)
- Ladies' Night (2005) (with Jessica Adams, Maggie Alderson and Chris Manby)
- The Stork Club (2006)
- In Bed With... (co-edited with Kathy Lette, 2009, with Jessica Adams, Maggie Alderson, et al.)
- The Witches of St Petersburg (2018)
