= Hotel Babylon (TV series) =

2006–2009 British television drama series

- Intertitle
- Created by: Tony Basgallop
- Based on: Hotel Babylon by Imogen Edwards-Jones
- Starring: Tamzin Outhwaite; Nigel Harman; Anna Wilson-Jones; Dexter Fletcher; Martin Marquez; Michael Obiora; Natalie Mendoza; Ray Coulthard; Max Beesley; Danira Gović; Alexandra Moen; Amy Nuttall; Emma Pierson
- Country of origin: United Kingdom
- Original language: English
- No. of series: 4
- No. of episodes: 32 (list of episodes)

Production
- Running time: 60 minutes
- Production company: Carnival Films

Original release
- Network: BBC One; BBC HD
- Release: 19 January 2006 – 14 August 2009

Hotel Babylon is a British television drama series based on the 2004 book of the same name by Imogen Edwards-Jones, that aired from 19 January 2006 to 14 August 2009, produced by independent production company Carnival Films for BBC One. The show followed the lives of workers at a glamorous five-star hotel.

The show was cancelled after its fourth series, leaving the series 4 finale cliffhanger unresolved.

== Cast and characters ==
=== Main cast ===
Cast of Hotel Babylon (2006)

Cast of Hotel Babylon (2009)

- Tamzin Outhwaite as Rebecca Mitchell – (series 1–2) former general manager.
- Max Beesley as Charlie Edwards – (series 1–3, guest series 4) the former general manager, former deputy manager, former head receptionist
- Dexter Fletcher as Tony Casemore – (series 1–4) the head concierge.
- Emma Pierson as Anna Thornton-Wilton – (series 1–4 episode 3) the former head receptionist.
- Natalie Mendoza as Jackie Clunes – (series 1–3) the former head of housekeeping.
- Martin Marquez as Gino Primirola – (series 1–4) the head barman.
- Michael Obiora as Ben Trueman – (series 1–4) the acting head receptionist, formerly receptionist.
- Ray Coulthard as James Schofield – (recurring series 1, main series 2–4) the food and beverage manager.
- Alexandra Moen as Emily James – (series 3–4) the PR manager.
- Lee Williams as Jack Harrison – (series 3) former general manager, former deputy manager.
- Nigel Harman as Sam Franklin – (series 4) the hotel owner.
- Anna Wilson-Jones as Juliet Miller – (series 4) the general manager.
- Danira Gović as Tanja Mihajlov – (recurring series 1–3, main series 4) the head of housekeeping, formerly maid.
- Amy Nuttall as Melanie Hughes – (series 4) the receptionist.

==== Sam Franklin ====
Sam Franklin
- Hotel Babylon character
- Portrayed by: Nigel Harman
- Duration: 2009
- First appearance: Episode 4.01
- Last appearance: Episode 4.08
In-universe information
- Occupation: Hotel Owner
- Spouse: Juliet Miller (divorced)

Sam Franklin arrives at the beginning of the fourth series, when London is brought to a halt by terrorist alarms. He becomes involved in affairs when he encourages the staff to open the hotel to as many people as possible, and it is revealed that he is the ex-husband of Juliet, who is overseeing the closure of the hotel. The charismatic, attractive businessman was previously unsuccessful but due to investments in a Chinese wind farm has now become a multi-millionaire. When a potential deal falls through, he steps in and buys the hotel himself, saving it from closure.

When he loses everything except the hotel, he becomes heavily involved in management, leading to tensions between himself and his ex-wife. Despite their divorce, they decide to celebrate their wedding anniversary and thereafter renew their sexual relationship. However, when he discovers that she had had an abortion when he left, they break up, and he begins to fall for Emily, the PR manager.

==== Juliet Miller ====
Juliet Miller
- Hotel Babylon character
- Portrayed by: Anna Wilson-Jones
- Duration: 2009
- First appearance: Episode 4.01
- Last appearance: Episode 4.08
In-universe information
- Occupation: General Manager
- Spouse: Sam Franklin (divorced)

Juliet Miller (previously Franklin) arrived originally as a bailiff when the hotel was facing closure in the opener of series four, but took the job of general manager when ex-husband Sam bought Babylon. She is described as professional and first rate at her job, Juliet takes no prisoners and has no room for sentiment when livelihoods and millions of pounds are at stake. Juliet has no issue making tough decisions but when it comes to her personal life she is thrown off course when former husband Sam turns up at the hotel. However, the two decided to work together and became friendly together. However, in episode 5, a brief incident involving Meredith Sutton made a rupture in the relationship. Meredith Sutton was a consultant who Sam hired to build the hotel's management team. However, Meredith was actually Sam's girlfriend and Juliet grew jealous and briefly left Hotel Babylon. Meredith Sutton opted for the job and Sam agreed until he found out a minute later that she had tampered with the exercise. Sam went after Juliet and managed to get her to return.

Preceded by Jack Harrison	General Manager of Hotel Babylon; 2009	Succeeded by N/A

==== Tony Casemore ====
Tony Casemore
- Hotel Babylon character
- Portrayed by: Dexter Fletcher
- Duration: 2006–2009
- First appearance: Episode 1.01
- Last appearance: Episode 4.08
In-universe information
- Occupation: Head Concierge
- Children: Liz Casemore

Tony Casemore is played by actor Dexter Fletcher. He first appeared in Series 1, Episode 1. Emily James stated that Casemore knows London inside out. The character is currently the head concierge but his previous role was Deputy Manager. Casemore is married and has two children; his daughter appears in Series 3. It is revealed in Series 3 that his family are often irritated at him for being at work a lot of the time. Casemore takes his work very seriously and gets annoyed when Rebecca Mitchell says the word concierge sounds "seedy". He uses his knowledge of London to help the guests anyway he can, in some cases this includes finding prostitutes. Casemore has a good friendship with his fellow workers at the hotel, in particular Anna; their relationship could be described as paternal as well as good friends.

Dexter Fletcher said on his character, "Yes he is a good family man and he always tries to make the right decision. The writers are really challenging Tony's values this series." "He sacrifices a lot in order to create a comfortable family life at home for his wife and children, and there is always that unintentional clash because he does work so hard he never gets to see his family." "When his daughter Liz turns up at the hotel for an audition a lot of home truths hit him and he is forced to reassess his position both as a father and within the hotel."

==== Gino Primirola ====
Gino Primirola
- Hotel Babylon character
- Portrayed by: Martin Marquez
- Duration: 2006–2009
- First appearance: Episode 1.01
- Last appearance: Episode 4.08
In-universe information
- Occupation: Head Barman
- Brothers: Ginelli Primirola

Gino Primirola is played by actor Martin Marquez. He first appeared in the series in Series 1, Episode 1. Gino has worked at the bar in the hotel for many years. A native of Rome, Italy, he grew up in Spain and still has a strong Spanish accent.

He currently holds the Barman of the Year Award (2007). He is known as a creative mixologist, developing new drinks.

==== James Schofield ====
James Schofield
- Hotel Babylon character
- Portrayed by: Ray Coulthard
- Duration: 2006–2009
- First appearance: Episode 1.01
- Last appearance: Episode 4.08
In-universe information
- Occupation: Food and Beverage Manager

James Schofield is played by Ray Coulthard. He is the food and beverage manager, although in series three it was revealed that he is on a permanent diet, after having lost weight following the advice of a man who stayed at the hotel.

From the beginning of the series, James is shown to be somewhat socially conservative, serving as something of a foil for Gino, who has more of a sympathy for the poor and less fortunate stemming from his own upbringing. In series two, James is also shown to have a gambling addiction after selling his BMW car to pay for his gambling addiction. James also secretly reveals to Ben that his wine tasting skills are a fraud and possesses no talent for wine tasting!

==== Emily James ====
Emily James
- Hotel Babylon character
- Portrayed by: Alexandra Moen
- Duration: 2008–2009
- First appearance: Episode 3.01
- Last appearance: Episode 4.08
In-universe information
- Occupation: PR Manager
- Parents: Damien Rushby (father); Mrs Rushby (nee James) (mother)

Emily Rushby (work name Emily James) is played by Alexandra Moen. She appeared at the beginning of the third series posing as a journalist attempting to seize incriminating information from the staff before revealing herself as the new manager of PR, much to the chagrin of the staff. It was revealed in the second episode of the fourth series that she is the daughter of the hotelier, Damien Rushby, who briefly becomes owner of Babylon, however she wishes to find her own way in the hotel industry. Emily can speak fluent German which is revealed when she pretends to be a Liechtenstein princess for Sam's PR fake wedding. Emily purchased the engagement ring from famous Jeweler 'Polished Diamonds' which was custom made. Ben acts out as one of the United Kingdom's richest men marrying the princess and falls in love with Emily briefly.

==== Benjamin "Ben" Trueman ====
Ben Trueman
- Hotel Babylon character
- Portrayed by: Michael Obiora
- Duration: 2006–2009
- First appearance: Episode 1.01
- Last appearance: Episode 4.08
In-universe information
- Occupation: Acting Head Receptionist

Benjamin "Ben" Trueman is played by Michael Obiora. He is openly gay, proud of his sexuality, and often provides comic relief. He is a receptionist and works with Head Receptionist, Anna Thornton-Wilton.

Growing up he took cocaine with his friend as revealed in Series 2. In the same series, it is revealed his friend is now a rapper and books into Hotel Babylon, Ben avoids him as it is well known he is homophobic. It is later revealed that Ben once kissed him when they were younger revealing this may be behind his hatred of gay men.

He is friends with the rest of staff but accuses Rebecca and Charlie of being racist out of anger of being the first to be told he and the rest of staff could lose their jobs in the second Series Finale.

Michel Obiora said on Ben Trueman from BBC.com, "Playing a gay character really brought out my feminine side and my girlfriend really liked it. She said I smiled a lot more and used my hands more to gesticulate. She really liked my camp side. She also thinks I take more time over my appearance now which I wasn't aware of."

Preceded by Anna Thornton-Wilton	Head Receptionist of Hotel Babylon; 2009-	Succeeded by incumbent

==== Melanie Hughes ====
Melanie Hughes
- Hotel Babylon character
- Portrayed by: Amy Nuttall
- Duration: 2009
- First appearance: Episode 4.07
- Last appearance: Episode 4.08
In-universe information
- Occupation: Receptionist

Melanie Hughes, played by actress Amy Nuttall, lands the job as the new receptionist at Hotel Babylon quite by accident when her boyfriend abandons her on the steps of Hotel Babylon in series four. After bluffing her way into the vacant post Ben takes her under his wing and turns ugly duckling Mel into a swan.

==== Tanja Mihajlov ====
Tanja Mihajlov
- Hotel Babylon character
- Portrayed by: Danira Gović
- Duration: 2006–2009
- First appearance: Episode 1.01
- Last appearance: Episode 4.08
In-universe information
- Occupation: Head of Housekeeping

Tanja Mihajlov is played by Danira Gović. Tanja is a member of the cleaning staff and plays a major role in the plot of first episode of Hotel Babylon. After she is viciously attacked by a woman in charge of the budget of the American rock band Junk Dogs (residing in the hotel), the staff schemes to get even with the malicious woman. Tanja was attacked because when she entered the Junk Dogs' room, she saw the woman sniffing cocaine. The lady was furious at Tanja and hit her, leaving several bruises on Tanja's face. While Tanja was struggling, she kept on saying "Dosta, dosta! (Enough, Enough!)"

In series 2 (episode 2) she is caught up with her horrific past in Croatia during the Croatian War of Independence. A guest named Michael Dović, an esteemed construction entrepreneur and family man from Croatia checks in. Tanja remembers his voice from the war during which he killed her friends and neighbours. He was then known as Dragan Milandroković. She confides to Charlie, but he thinks that she's probably mistaken because of her trauma. Disappointed about the hotel management's attitude towards her problem, she takes matters into her own hands desperate to prove she's right and to make the mercenary pay for his misdeeds.

Charlie looks up Milandroković's name on the Internet and finds a bunch of horrible and notorious articles about him. About Dović, on the other hand, he doesn't find anything incriminating. In fact, Dović even set up an orphanage for children with parents killed in the civil war. But when he anticipates Tanja's assault on Dović, he realizes that he has had a plastic surgery and got a completely new identity. In the end Charlie helps her by having Milandroković discreetly arrested and kicked out of the hotel.

Tanja is from Croatia, and has an accent when speaking English, but is nevertheless well understood by the rest of the hotel staff. She speaks in her mother tongue on several occasions, often when she's furious because of something. In the first episode she says after being beaten up: "E, lipo je meni mater rekla 'Vrati se ti, kćeri, u Šibenik, oni su ti svi ludi!'" (I should've listened to my Mum when she said 'Come back to Šibenik, honey, they're all crazy!). Later, after being frustrated at the hotel manager who was trying to keep things hushed up, she says, "Ma, razumiš ti vraga crnoga!" ("You don't freakin' understand anything!").

Tanja mentions Šibenik, the Croatian city in which Danira Gović was born and raised. This implies that Tanja is a Dalmatian girl who speaks the Ikavian accent.

Preceded by Jackie Clunes	Head of Housekeeping of Hotel Babylon; 2009-	Succeeded by incumbent

In Series 4 she becomes a main character appearing in the title card.

==== Anna Thornton-Wilton ====
Anna Thornton-Wilton
- Hotel Babylon character
- Portrayed by: Emma Pierson
- Duration: 2006–2009
- First appearance: Episode 1.01
- Last appearance: Episode 4.03
In-universe information
- Occupation: Former Head Receptionist
- Spouse: Charlie Edwards (2009-)
- Children: Scarlett Rose Edwards

Anna Edwards (née Thornton-Wilton) is played by actress Emma Pierson. She has been a main character since the series began. She is a comical character who isn't very intellectual, and she often follows her heart instead of her head, which provides humour in the show. She wears high heels and a very glossy 'Scarlet Rose' shade of lipstick as part of her receptionist uniform, but this adds to her 'ditzy' demeanour, increasing the comedic aspects of her character.

Anna arrived in episode 1 from 'The Chesterton' hotel to interview for the position of Deputy Manager at Hotel Babylon. Although a likely candidate for the job, she was beaten to the post by Charlie Edwards. Rebecca asked her to stay at Hotel Babylon as Head Receptionist, the post which Charlie gave up for Deputy Manager.

Anna is aspirational. She works in the luxury hotel business because not only does she feel completely at home - it's the only way she can afford to be a part of it. She's gorgeous but knows it, and as far as she's concerned it's only a matter of time before she bags a wealthy and eligible man. Her sole ambition is to marry into the lifestyle she believes she deserves. But her plans become unstuck when Anna finds herself head over heels in love and not with the wealthy entrepreneur she's always dreamed of. Anna's posh persona is as fake as her hyphenated family name, as Series 2 reveals.

In Series 2 Episode 3, it is revealed that Anna's family are not so grand after all. A grand ball is organized for guest Lady Catherine Stanwood (played by Kelly Brook). Lady Catherine was once a former work-colleague of Anna's at 'The Chesterton' hotel before Catherine married Lord Stanwood. Anna is shocked and deeply envious of Catherine's new status which forces Anna to lie and self-promote herself to "Hotel Deputy Manager In-Waiting" to boost her perceived status in the hotel. Later, during the ball, Anna's actual role in the hotel is revealed to Catherine which prompts Catherine to accuse Anna of being a 'fake'. Anna's father is publicly revealed by Catherine, to be a council clerk and her mother, a school dinner lady. In a separate scene in the same episode, Anna also privately reveals to Charlie that her real family name is only 'Thornton', not 'Thornton-Wilton', which Anna has used throughout her career to elevate her social standing. Later, Lady Catherine and Anna are friends again. Catherine also confirms a rumour to Anna that 'The Chesterton' had a staff party celebrating Anna's departure.

Before the events of the first series, it was revealed that Anna had slept with Charlie Edwards when they worked together at 'The Chesterton' hotel, prior to the beginning of the series. They eventually began dating in Series 3, though they later broke up and Charlie seemingly abandoned her for good.

Anna is personable, and is close friends with the rest of the staff in the hotel. At the end of Series 3 she begins dating a surgeon; however, she rejected his proposal of marriage when she found he was using her to have children. She also had a tempestuous relationship with Emma Pierson. It was Pierson who said of Anna, "She has grown up a bit and changed a little but she is still naughty and irreverent underneath." Having had two years of getting to know each other Anna and Jackie eventually managed to settle their differences, getting along rather well despite dealing with Emily, a new female colleague on the floor, interrupting their dynamic.

In the first episode of Series 4, Anna appears pregnant, but the father is not disclosed to the audience. She later discovers that her colleagues are taking bets on who they believe the father is, leading to some fallout between them. In order to quiet the rumor mill she asks Darren, one of the hotel's waitstaff, to pretend to be the father; he subsequently becomes infatuated with her, leading to further drama. Further antics play out when it is revealed that a cache of emeralds is secreted away somewhere within the hotel; Anna subsequently uncovers clues relating to its location and retrieves the gems, returning some of them.

Later in the series, Anna goes into labor during the workday. Charlie returns to the hotel as a result, and is revealed to be the father of her child. He proposes to Anna, and she accepts, naming her healthy baby daughter Scarlett Rose, named after her lipstick. The three of them depart the hotel at the series' conclusion, the remainder of the emeralds hidden up her sleeve.

Preceded by Charlie Edwards	Head Receptionist of Hotel Babylon; 2006–2009	Succeeded by Ben Trueman

==== Charlie Edwards ====
Charlie Edwards
- Hotel Babylon character
- Portrayed by: Max Beesley
- Duration: 2006–2008, 2009
- First appearance: Episode 1.01
- Last appearance: Episode 4.03
In-universe information
- Occupation: Former General Manager
- Spouse: Anna Thornton-Wilton (2009-)
- Children: Scarlett Rose Edwards

Charles "Charlie" Edwards is played by Max Beesley. He first appeared in Series 1, Episode 1 and last appeared in Series 4, Episode 3 to propose to Anna. After the departure of Rebecca Mitchell (Tamzin Outhwaite), Charlie became manager. Beesley also narrates the series mostly informing the viewers of hotel events and activities (e.g. the hotel rating system and hotel thefts). He has also been in prison for a year

Not a lot of his past is mentioned in the show. He has worked in other hotels, such as the Chesterton. The BBC character description describes his past as "complex". Charlie also has a brother, Dan, who appears in an episode of the second series (played by Chris Coghill). He is indicated to be considerably less successful than Charlie and to have got on the wrong side of the law several times.

Edwards spent 12 months in prison after being sentenced for 18 months. He informed guest "Bones" or Mr Wiltshire (full name not mentioned) of his sentence. This was because of fraud. He did not mention this on his application form and therefore nearly got fired. Several times, Charlie uses skills that he might've picked up within the prison system, such as criminal knowledge or fighting ability (shown during an episode in the second series, where he manages to subdue a staff member holding a guest hostage with a swift and accurate punch).

During the first series, Edwards was dating Jackie. They reserved rooms to spend the night. Their relationship was kept discreet at the start. Charlie kissed Rebecca at the staff Christmas party in series two. They arranged to have dinner soon after, but due to complications involving Charlie's younger brother, never did. They eventually agreed to keep their relationship professional, though Rebecca kissed him goodbye in the series two finale. Charlie and Anna dated in series 3, but split up just before Charlie left.

Charlie comes under a lot of pressure when he replaces Rebecca as the general manager of Hotel Babylon. He receives an email that informs that the hotel's profits are down by a lot and is then unable to pay the cleaners due to a mix up with wages. He is forced to take out a loan with a friend from when he was in prison to pay the cleaners however, his friend wants the money back sooner than Charlie can get it back. Charlie is called up to a room by Jackie who has accidentally killed a thug who was stealing from cleaners. Charlie realises the thug was taking the money to pay back Charlie's debt and so helps Jackie, with the aid of Tanja, dispose of the body. Charlie then leaves when his friend, Hutch, makes him an offer to travel with him.

Max Beesley said about Charlie, "It's a bit different playing the General Manager now because there is more responsibility for Charlie. Even though he is not running around like a headless chicken, like he was in the first series, he has to be more centred because there is a lot of pressure on him."

He is the father to Anna's daughter, Scarlett Rose. He has moved to New York with Anna and Scarlett.

Preceded by Rebecca Mitchell	General Manager of Hotel Babylon; 2007–2008	Succeeded by Jack Harrison
Preceded by Unknown	Deputy Manager of Hotel Babylon; 2006–2007	Succeeded by Jack Harrison

==== Jack Harrison ====
Jack Harrison
- Hotel Babylon character
- Portrayed by: Lee Williams
- Duration: 2008
- First appearance: Episode 3.04
- Last appearance: Episode 3.08
In-universe information
- Occupation: Former General Manager

Jack Harrison is played by Lee Williams. He first appeared in Series 3, Episode 4. He was general manager. The character joined the staff of Hotel Babylon in its 3rd Series, intending to be the Deputy Manager, but after Charlie Edwards (played by Max Beesley) left, the general manager position became vacant and he was promoted to general manager. In Episode One of Series Four after more than a year as manager it was revealed that Jack had left the hotel and was replaced by Juliet; Tony hinted that Jack had taken the blame for the imminent closure of Hotel Babylon and was sacked by the directors of the hotel.

Preceded by Charlie Edwards	General Manager of Hotel Babylon; 2008-2009	Succeeded by Juliet Miller
Preceded by Charlie Edwards	Deputy Manager of Hotel Babylon; 2008	Succeeded by N/A

==== Jackie Clunes ====
Jackie Clunes
- Hotel Babylon character
- Portrayed by: Natalie Mendoza
- Duration: 2006–2008
- First appearance: Episode 1.01
- Last appearance: Episode 3.05
In-universe information
- Occupation: Former Head of Housekeeping

Jackie Clunes is played by Natalie Mendoza. She first appeared in Series 1, Episode 1 and was a fictional character until she was written out in Series 3, Episode 5. She is Australian and many of her staff are immigrants, some are even revealed to be in the country illegally in series 1 and she herself was almost deported after it was revealed her visa had run out.

Jackie has a son and was almost married. However, her fiancée left her which made her an illegal immigrant due to her being on his visa. Jackie had a new five-month visa in series 1 after cutting a deal with immigration.

Jackie is in charge of cleaners at the hotel whom she treats with respect. She often looks after the cleaners and refers to them as "her girls". She has a friendly relationship with most of the other staff. In series 1, she has somewhat of a rivalry with Anna.

Jackie left after an accident left a thug dead in the hotel. She confronted the thug in a room after he stole from the cleaners due to a debt Charlie had with his client. The thug attacked Jackie, prompting her to run into the bathroom and lock the door. Jackie sprayed shampoo on the floor and grabbed an ornament to use as a weapon. The thug broke into the bathroom and walked towards Jackie, however slipped on the shampoo and hit his head on the edge of the bath, which killed him instantly. With the aid of Charlie and Tanja, Jackie had the body disposed of, and Jackie and her son flew back to Australia.

Preceded by Unknown	Head of Housekeeping of Hotel Babylon; 2006-2008	Succeeded by Tanja Mihajlov

==== Rebecca Mitchell ====
Rebecca Mitchell
- Hotel Babylon character
- Portrayed by: Tamzin Outhwaite
- Duration: 2006–2007
- First appearance: Episode 1.01
- Last appearance: Episode 2.08
In-universe information
- Occupation: Former General Manager

Rebecca Mitchell is played by Tamzin Outhwaite. She was arguably the main character, appearing first on cast introduction in the opening credits. However, at the end of series 2 she is written off and has not appeared in the series since. She was the general manager of Hotel Babylon until she resigned; she was generally quite strict with staff but seemed to have good relationship with them.

During the first series Rebecca has a troubled marriage and often sleeps in the hotel when she is left at home alone. Rebecca's marriage does recover; however, she does divorce her husband eventually and in the second series finds out her now ex-husband is in a romantic relationship with a friend of hers.

Rebecca is usually quite strict with staff and often got annoyed with Anna for being late for work on numerous occasions in the first series. In the second series she has a romantic relationship with Charlie. However she becomes suspicious of him when she sees him with another woman and it is presumed they have split up since she left.

Rebecca left at the end of Series 2. After the hotel was nearly taken over by hotel tycoon Donovan Credo, Rebecca was forced to lay off Jackie, James, Ben, Gino and Anna, before revealing to Tony that he and Charlie have been selected to stay. Tony's reaction to this prompts Rebecca to take action to call off the deal, preventing Credo buying out and gutting Hotel Babylon. This one false move causes Rebecca to lose the trust of her staff. On leaving her office, Rebecca tells Charlie to "make himself comfortable". When she has left, he sits down and reads an email on the screen that names him as Hotel Babylon's new general manager. He chases after Rebecca, asking her what's going on. She tells him she is leaving, because all in all the hotel ruined her marriage and her life.

Preceded by Unknown	General Manager of Hotel Babylon; 2006–2007	Succeeded by Charlie Edwards

=== Guests ===
The show often attracts well known actors and celebrities, normally posing as guests staying at the hotel.

Series 1

- Martin Ball
- Keith Allen
- Joan Collins
- Susie Amy
- Dugald Bruce Lockhart
- Les Dennis
- Steve Pemberton
- Anthony Head
- Rachael Stirling
- Anamaria Marinca
- Jamie Theakston
- Zoe Tapper
- Craig Kelly
- Lesley Nicol

Series 2

- John Schwab
- Chris Moyles
- David Walliams
- Zöe Salmon
- Christopher Parker
- Danny Dyer
- Kelly Brook
- Kacey Ainsworth
- Chantelle Houghton
- Ronni Ancona
- Russ Abbot
- Samuell Benta
- Cherie Lunghi
- Jennifer Ellison
- Julian Clary
- Gina Bellman
- Mark Heap
- Richard Bacon
- Alexander Armstrong
- Vanessa Feltz
- Jerry Hall
- John Sessions

Series 3

- Adèle Anderson
- Bonnie Langford
- Samantha Bond
- John Barrowman
- Jude Law
- Travis Oliver
- Kwame Kwei-Armah
- Megan Dodds
- Anita Dobson
- Daniel Lapaine
- Jeremy Sheffield
- Alan Davies
- Joe Montana
- Jon Culshaw
- Paula Abdul
- Nicola Stephenson
- Lesley Garrett
- Lee Sharpe
- Marc Bannerman
- Donna Air
- James Lance
- Nigel Quashie
- Nicholas Rowe
- Don Gilet
- Nathaniel Parker
- Bob Goody
- Abigail Peel
- Sophie Wu
- Paul Kaye
- Jason Watkins
- John Marquez

Series 4

- Preeya Kalidas
- Chris Bisson
- Ernest Ignatius
- Abi Titmuss
- Ben Fogle
- Patrick Baladi
- Caroline Catz
- Honor Blackman
- Tony Robinson
- Michael Winner
- Christopher Cazenove
- Frances Barber
- Alex Zane
- Denise van Outen
- James Fleet
- Janet Ellis
- Darius Danesh
- Kelly Osbourne
- John Savident
- Hugh Dennis
- Michelle Collins
- Thaila Zucchi
- Ruby Turner

== Episodes ==
There were four series broadcast, each consisting of 8 episodes. An episode is one hour long, although rebroadcasts in other countries are edited for length. An episode also begins and ends with a short comment from one of the main characters outlining that episode's theme.

=== Series overview ===
Series	Episodes	Originally released	
Series	Episodes	First released	Last released
1	8	19 January 2006	9 March 2006
2	8	15 February 2007	12 April 2007
3	8	19 February 2008	8 April 2008
4	8	19 June 2009	14 August 2009

=== Series 1 (2006) ===
No. overall	No. in series	Title	Directed by	Written by	Original release date	Viewers (millions)
1	1	"Episode 1"	Alrick Riley	Tony Basgallop	19 January 2006	5.15
Head receptionist Charlie (Max Beesley) wants to move up the ranks in hospitality and gets interviewed by General Manager Rebecca (Tamzin Outhwaite) for the job of Deputy Manager. His contender in the role for deputy manager is Anna (Emma Pierson) with whom he had a brief fling in the past. On the plus side, the beautiful Head of Housekeeping Jackie (Natalie Mendoza) has started inviting him to assignations in guest bedrooms. To prove his worth for this job, he manipulates a world famous rock band into spending as much money and trashing as much of the hotel as possible. Thanks to their hard-nosed manager Nina (Rachael Stirling) things don't exactly go to plan at first, but when she assaults one of the chambermaids, Charlie takes matters into his own hands. With the help of the rest of the staff, Charlie organises a surprise party to teach her a lesson, and extract as much money as possible from the band. Rebecca, meanwhile, is having troubles of her own – she is avoiding going home. Charlie eventually gets the job but is dismayed to find that Anna has taken his old post of Head Receptionist. And his troubles don't end there – he has been spotted by a suspicious limousine driver who claims to know him and implies he has something to hide.
2	2	"Episode 2"	Alrick Riley	Tony Basgallop	26 January 2006	5.13
Rebecca puts Charlie in charge of keeping suicidal guest Mr Machin (Anthony Head) alive, while concierge Tony has to deal with the repercussions of mistaking a legitimate guest for a hooker. But this is the least of Charlie's worries as Rebecca's re-branding of his job has severely rocked his confidence. The staff help an elderly ex-worker celebrate her 50th wedding anniversary, forcing Rebecca to reflect on her own marriage. Meanwhile, shady limousine driver Pete (Craig Kelly) becomes ever more demanding as he threatens to divulge whatever it is he knows about Charlie's mysterious past.
3	3	"Episode 3"	Alrick Riley	Howard Overman	2 February 2006	5.34
Wealthy Russian student Natasha (Anamaria Marinca) begs Charlie to help her organise a green card wedding at the hotel. Charlie only agrees after Tony reminds him of how much cash they could make from delivery scams at the event, realising it's the one way he can raise the money to bribe Pete out of telling Rebecca about his past. Finding an agreeable suitor is easy enough, but can they convince Natasha's billionaire father Vladimir (Matthew Marsh), and more importantly Rebecca, that the wedding is genuine? The whirlwind of wedding plans catch Rebecca on a personal level, but it's obsessive compulsive guest Mr Daniels (Steve Pemberton) who makes her realise that hiding in the hotel isn't going to solve her own relationship problems. Charlie's scams earn him enough to pay off Pete, but the whole affair has made Rebecca suspicious. She takes the initiative, and delves a little into his employment history.
4	4	"Episode 4"	Iain B. MacDonald	Harry Wootliff	9 February 2006	5.26
When Anna bumps into – literally – wealthy American lawyer Richard (Matt Day), she becomes convinced they're fated to be together. In a delusional whirl, she stops at nothing to get this man (and the lifestyle) that she's after. And if it means breaching the 'strictly no guest/staff relationships' rule, well, Anna's always felt rules were meant to be broken. With Rebecca on her back, only the quick thinking of fellow receptionist Ben keeps Anna's indiscretions under wraps. Charlie is happy to let beautiful female guest Alice (Susie Amy) massage his bruised ego after colleague and love interest Jackie goes off on a date. Alice turns out not to be all that she seems, robbing her date and making off with Pete. When the date is found drugged in his room the next day, Charlie realises he's had a narrow escape, and that he should value Jackie more. Meanwhile, James and Gino bicker over the treatment of a couple who won a stay at Hotel Babylon in a competition. Rebecca confronts Pete over Alice, but he replies by suggesting she might be surprised by the background of some of her staff. Fortunately for Charlie, she's distracted by a visit from her husband Mark (James Weber Brown).
5	5	"Episode 5"	Iain B. MacDonald	Toby Whithouse	16 February 2006	4.52
Below stairs, we witness a world the guests never normally get to see – the immigrant labour that really makes the place work. A raid on the hotel by Immigration Officers forces Jackie into a dilemma when she's reminded by the officials about her own immigration status. What can she do to stop them deporting her? Gino has less serious problems – in order to keep the tips from a particularly generous guest flowing, he has to pretend to be gay. Can even Ben help him convince in the role? Meanwhile, Charlie is asked by a guest, Liz Sykes (Lisa Faulkner) to help cover up an affair she's been conducting at the hotel. Rebecca takes a hard line with him and orders him not to intervene, disarming him by implying she knows something about his fraudulent past. When Liz's lover, John Fuller, returns to the hotel with yet another woman, Charlie realises that Liz is being spun a line. A quick phone call leads to an uncomfortable confrontation for John. But Charlie's actions lead to an inevitable showdown when Rebecca realises he's disobeyed her. Fighting to save his job, Charlie manages to turn the tables on her.
6	6	"Episode 6"	Iain B. MacDonald	Howard Overman	23 February 2006	4.71
Already spooked after Tony tells them a grisly tale of murder at a nearby hotel, Anna and Charlie are further unsettled by the disappearance of security guard Jagdeep. Anna delivers a bottle of whiskey to a sheik, who is staying at the hotel after buying antique pistols at a Sotheby's auction. On her way back, she becomes convinced that she's heard a guest murder his wife. Charlie refuses to take her seriously, despite having seen the guest, Mr Johnson, arguing with his wife earlier. Mr Johnson's behaviour – like sneaking his suitcases out in the middle of the night – worries Anna. With Charlie's help, she snoops around in his room, and discovers blood in the bath and a bag of rope, tape and rubber gloves. In the bowels of the hotel, Charlie discovers Jagdeep seriously ill in a toilet cubicle. Meanwhile, Anna is terrified when Mr Johnson tries to make her accompany him. Seeing how scared she is, Charlie finally agrees to confront him, but when they go to his room they find a young, drunk, woman tied up in his wardrobe. A returning Mr Johnson is hit on the head by Anna – and Charlie finally phones Rebecca. She finds that Mr and Mrs Johnson were attempting to retrieve the pistols bought by the sheik. To do this, they abducted one of the sheik's wives – the woman in the wardrobe – and Mrs Johnson had swapped places with her. Given the option of arrest or a cover-up, all parties decide on keeping things quiet – and Rebecca finally escapes for her romantic holiday.
7	7	"Episode 7"	Keith Boak	Imogen Edwards-Jones & Tony Basgallop	2 March 2006	5.74
When £3,000 goes missing from the room of wealthy guest Lady Patton (Joan Collins), stolen by someone using a staff pass, Rebecca comes down hard on the staff. Suddenly everyone is a suspect facing instant dismissal if found guilty. Riled and suddenly untrusting, she not only interviews all of the staff, but also calls in an auditor – much to the distress of Gino and Jackie, whose stocktake figures are complete fantasy. Meanwhile, Anna is leading a teenage virtuoso violinist into naughtiness. Derek the doorman manages to persuade Rebecca, via Charlie to interview his wayward son for a job at the hotel. The lad is rubbish, though. About to break the bad news to Derek, Charlie realises the awful truth from something the doorman says – Derek must be the hotel thief. Rebecca must maintain her professional stance and hand Derek his P45. The anguish doesn't end there, despite Tony's good work in heading-off ball-crunching auditor Ms Merchant with some well-placed bribes. A disgruntled hotel guest surprises everyone by revealing himself to be a hotel inspector – and issuing a damning threat!
8	8	"Episode 8"	Keith Boak	Tony Basgallop	9 March 2006	5.62
The surprise arrival of the hotel chain's European Director Adrian unsettles the staff further. Only Rebecca knows he's there for more than purely business reasons – the two of them had a fling a few months before. Adrian proves to be only the start of their worries: a star witness, Mr Wiltshire, is being housed at the hotel during the course of an infamous gangland trial. Tony is nervous about the risk to staff and Charlie has the unenviable task of looking after the guest. Whilst Tony attempts to foment a mutiny amongst the staff, Rebecca finds herself being wooed by Adrian with an offer of promotion abroad – and a new life with him. Meanwhile, Charlie builds up a rapport with Mr Wiltshire, and realises that he's come to the hotel just to die away from prison. Rebecca is put on the spot when her husband arrives for a surprise anniversary dinner organised by the staff. Forced to choose between her career and her marriage, she hesitates. But before she can make up her mind, gunshots ring out from the ninth floor – where Charlie is trying to protect Mr Wiltshire!

=== Series 2 (2007) ===
No. overall	No. in series	Title	Directed by	Written by	Original release date	Viewers (millions)
9	1	"Episode 1"	Andy Wilson	Tony Basgallop	15 February 2007	5.79
Mr and Mrs Poldark (Russ Abbot and Cherie Lunghi), who've both undergone plastic surgery, check into the hotel separately. They want to recuperate before their 20th wedding anniversary celebrations. But the staff become involved in various escapades, trying to prevent the couple from meeting. Meanwhile, prominent MP Theresa Evans (Ronni Ancona) is forced to hide in the hotel following the news that her husband Robert (William Scott-Masson) has had an affair. And below stairs the war with rival hotel The Burlington reaches new levels of drama when Babylon's bar stools go missing. How will the Babylon staff retaliate? Other famous faces checking in are Chris Moyles and Chantelle Houghton and former EastEnder Kacey Ainsworth as Maria Henson.
10	2	"Episode 2"	Andy Wilson	Simon Block	22 February 2007	5.91
A Premiership football team checks into the hotel ahead of a must-win big match. They make the mistake of upsetting the hotel staff, who begin planning a satisfying revenge. Meanwhile, a weird group of guests, all dressed in black and named after Cornish villages, arouse Anna's interest. To her horror she discovers they're an 'end of the world cult'. Will she be able to escape their clutches?
11	3	"Episode 3"	Andy Wilson	Andy Rattenbury	1 March 2007	6.39
Glamour arrives in the shape of Viscount and the new Viscountess Stanwood and their fabulous Viennese Charity Masked Ball, hosted by Julian Clary. However, Anna's arched eyebrows are raised even further when she recognises her old pal and fellow chamber maid Caz Simpson, aka the now Lady Catherine Stanwood, on the arm of Lord Stanwood. Anna's envy quotient reaches an all-time high. Can she help herself to a piece of the action? Elsewhere, homophobic rap artist Switchback decides to give old school friend Ben the time of his life at a party in his suite. Is there more to Ben and Switchback's friendship than meets the eye?
12	4	"Episode 4"	Paul Whittington	Jack Lothian	8 March 2007	5.49
High-flying businessman Robert Kane (Mark Heap) proposes to his girlfriend, Lisa (Sian Brooke), in the restaurant. She's thrilled until she discovers he actually lost his job six months previously and is running out of money. Lisa dumps Robert, who heads toward the balcony with the aim of throwing himself off. Charlie talks him out of it and agrees to give Robert the vacant position of bellboy. But is Robert in the right state of mind to make a success of his new job? Meanwhile, Rebecca receives notice that her divorce is final and decides to hold a party with school time friends, and Jackie makes a shocking discovery about restaurant manager James...
13	5	"Episode 5"	Paul Whittington	Harriet Braun	22 March 2007	5.77
When a shop-assistant-turned-reality-show celebrity, Carrie Cottan (Jennifer Ellison), checks into Hotel Babylon, Gino becomes besotted with her. Carrie's famous for having an affair with TV presenter Marcus Walker, and is enjoying her 15 minutes of fame. Elsewhere in the hotel, Jackie is delighted when a novelist she admires, Francis Levington (Angus Wright), checks in prior to his latest book launch. She makes an excuse to meet him alone, but soon comes to regret her actions.
14	6	"Episode 6"	Paul Whittington	Imogen Edwards-Jones	29 March 2007	5.43
Tony loses out on the Concierge of the Year award because his services are deemed old-fashioned. Riled, he decides it's time to modernise his game. But when he gets involved with a gang of Russian drug dealers he soon find himself out of his depth. Meanwhile, Rebecca realises she has a serious mutiny on her hands after cancelling the Christmas party. She reinstates it, with Charlie's help, and he ends up proving his worth in more ways than one. Elsewhere, famous British actor and renowned sex addict, Aiden Spencer (Alexander Armstrong), is using the hotel for a press junket to promote his latest film. Head Receptionist Anna with his terrified PA, Elizabeth (Sally Bretton), and, pretending to be a journalist, gets the truth out of the actor about his "problem". Could this be Anna's dream ticket if she sells the tape to a real journalist?
15	7	"Episode 7"	Nigel Douglas	Harriet Braun	5 April 2007	5.34
Wanting to remain professional, Rebecca and Charlie agree to meet to discuss the new developments in their relationship. However, seeing them together ignites feelings of jealousy in Jackie. In the middle of juggling both women, Charlie's younger brother, Dan (Christopher Coghill), arrives at the hotel – which can only mean trouble. Meanwhile, the restaurant's wine list is looking worryingly short of top vintages When wealthy Mrs Klein (Jerry Hall) suggests a wine taste-off at the hotel to win a case of very expensive Petrus '61, James feels he has no option but to comply. But can he survive the event with his reputation intact?
16	8	"Episode 8"	Nigel Douglas	Simon Block	12 April 2007	5.87
Hotel Babylon is facing a takeover by Donovan Credo – infamous in the hotel trade for ousting the staff and bringing in his own 'drones'. Rebecca is to be kept on but Donovan allows her to keep only two members of staff. Rebecca chooses Charlie but makes him decide upon the other, dangling the managerial career carrot in front of him. Starting with Ben, one by one the staff are all given their notices. Tony learns he is the other member of staff to be kept on. However, he throws it back in their faces and walks out. When Charlie also decides to resign, Rebecca is forced to reveal to him that the Babylon Group are finding an alternative buyer (a Japanese company). Firing the staff was a stalling technique to give the Japanese more time to gather relevant information. Rebecca and Charlie work through the night ensuring the Japanese have everything they need to achieve a successful bid and at the very last minute they have succeeded. As Donovan walks out with his tail between his legs Charlie reassembles the team for a celebratory meeting. However, they feel that Rebecca has betrayed them. Rebecca leaves the hotel – for good. Charlie receives notification that he's to be made General Manager at Rebecca's recommendation.

=== Series 3 (2008) ===
No. overall	No. in series	Title	Directed by	Written by	Original release date	Viewers (millions)
17	1	"Episode 1"	Julian Simpson	Simon Block	19 February 2008	5.01
Following the departure of Babylon's General Manager Rebecca, Charlie steps up to fill her shoes. He's soon under pressure when Anna becomes embroiled in a moral dilemma involving fashion company De Rigueur. The answer lies in a DVD. Meanwhile it's Tony's 40th birthday and no-one seems to care, apart from an American guest (Paula Abdul). Charlie gives him the task of babysitting a party of jurors in a murder trial. Disillusioned, things begin to look up when an attractive female juror (Nicola Stephenson) invites him to her room with a life-changing proposition. Elsewhere Emily James, a journalist, is asking awkward questions about the hotel. The employees are happy to help until they realise they have been duped. But there is more to this than meets the eye, who is she and what is she up to?
18	2	"Episode 2"	Julian Simpson	Imogen Edwards-Jones	26 February 2008	5.34
Love is in the air as Valentine's night approaches, but the restaurant has received a damning review from restaurant critic Alexander Crawfield (Nathaniel Parker). New PR Emily rises to the challenge and convinces Charlie to hire hot celebrity chef, Otto Clark (Alan Davies), leaving the Head Chef, Adam Price (Jeremy Sheffield), out on a limb. Gino suspects that a pair of bronzed and beautiful guests are using one of the rooms to shoot porn and stream it over the internet. Jackie's doubt doesn't wash with the boys, but she manages to stay one crucial step ahead of them, and ultimately laughs all the way to the bank. Meanwhile, the romance bug has caught up with Charlie and Anna and it looks like its game on until Anna becomes too close to Lady Hamilton (Anita Dobson) and her very eligible son Giles. Charlie can't contain his jealousy, realising that money and class are the only things that seem to interest Anna after all. Unless both he and Anna have read the situation wrong?
19	3	"Episode 3"	Julian Simpson	Andrew Rattenbury	4 March 2008	4.62
Hotel tycoon, Donald Stern's daughter Naomi (Katie McGuiness) is marrying a wealthy American, Earl Archer (Michael Landes), and he wants her to have the best wedding possible. However with the wedding planner away, it's up to Emily and Anna to make it a success. Unfortunately Emily can't help reverting to her old party ways and causes chaos on Naomi's hen night. It will certainly prove a wedding to remember. As a result of the society wedding, Charlie introduces a system ensuring that the team get an equal reward from the tips for having to pull out all the stops. Ben is deemed the most reliable and is entrusted with keeping a watch over this money. However, temptation gets the better of him. Meanwhile Brad Shelford, 'Weightloss guru' (Don Gilet) is staying at Babylon for his promotional book tour. He arrives with gorgeous blonde, Carla on his arm, and immediately Gino is envious of his perfect lifestyle, but is Brad as happy as he makes out?
20	4	"Episode 4"	Andy Hay	Jack Williams	11 March 2008	4.84
It's the final rounds of auditions for new West End musical Princess Scrunchie. The hotel's alive with precocious kids and crazy showbiz parents, the worst being Scarlett Adams (Bonnie Langford). Tony is stunned when his thirteen-year-old daughter Liz arrives out of the blue and announces that she's in the final ten. Gino's brother, Ginelli, appears and finds himself helping Gino out behind the bar. The problem is that Ginelli can charm the birds from the trees, which Charlie puts to good use. Unfortunately this is what Gino feared and the truth about their brotherly relationship comes out. Jack Harrison is the last of the candidates for a new management role. Charlie gives him the awesome challenge of looking after Mr Delaney (Jon Culshaw). However the pressure soon gets to him, and Jack tries to make a speedy exit. A mysterious stranger saves Anna's life and she is eternally grateful – but who is he? After much investigation, she finds him staying at the hotel and discovers him to be her very own Mr. Wright. There is clearly chemistry, but he's called away and Anna's luck runs out, or does it?
21	5	"Episode 5"	Andy Hay	Marston Bloom	18 March 2008	4.98
Charlie is starting to realise the pressure of managing a five-star hotel when a report from head office shows profits are down. His day gets worse when it emerges the chambermaids haven't been paid. Hutch (Kwame Kwei-Armah) a friend of Charlie's, is an established diamond dealer, who’s arrived for an exclusive jewellery auction being hosted at the hotel. However rumours of a planned heist are making people jittery. When Hutch realises the auction might be cancelled, he becomes desperate, revealing to Charlie that the auction is his ticket to freedom. With Head Office on his back, the chambermaids at their wits end and his friend needing help, Charlie turns to ex cell-mate turned loan shark, Terry to secure the extra finance he needs. When a further payroll mistake means there's no money to pay Terry back, things go from bad to worse with serious repercussions for Terry's henchman, Sparks (Marc Bannerman). Charlie's world is closing in and his days at Hotel Babylon suddenly appear to be numbered. Can Hutch offer him a much needed lifeline?
22	6	"Episode 6"	Andy Hay	Howard Overman	25 March 2008	5.00
Jack has just been promoted to General Manager, and this year's big 'rom com' is being filmed in Babylon by a very emotional director (John Barrowman). Problems arise as leaks to the press, a lack of on-screen chemistry between Katy (Megan Dodds) and Tom (James Lance) and a gaffe by Jack all threaten the film, and ultimately Babylon's profits. It's up to Jack to save the day, but will he succeed? Anna is having a dilemma. Ned has just invited her for a weekend away in New York, but she can't get Charlie out of her head. Finding it hard to know what to do she confides in Rachel (Donna Air), an enigmatic young woman who seems to have it all. But Rachel has her own secrets and reasons for living the high life, and Anna resolves to bring Rachel the happiness she deserves, and also to make amends with Ned.
23	7	"Episode 7"	Sam Miller	Andrew Rattenbury	1 April 2008	4.45
Illusionist Dan Black (David Schneider) is in town to do his next big stunt – disappear from Trafalgar Square. Anna seeks out how to perform his stunts and easily masters the art of levitating. Eager to find out more of his secrets she coerces Ben into going to Black's room whilst he’s out performing. However, Black manages to get the last laugh. Chat show host, Eddie Palmer (Steven Pinder) asks Tony to get him some female company. Palmer insists on using one of his regular contacts, so Tony escorts Mei (Sophie Wu), a young looking, Chinese woman, to Palmer's room with dire consequences. Much to Gino's jealousy, the restaurant is a roaring success. James hopes to keep up this success by unveiling his meticulously planned new menu. But when James falls for one of the new waitresses, and the Burlington's GM turns up to see Gino, it raises more than a few eyebrows. But there's a shock in store for Babylon the next day.
24	8	"Episode 8"	Sam Miller	Simon Block	8 April 2008	Under 4.39
Soon to be famous faith healer, Jonah Slaughter (Nicholas Rowe), arrives at Babylon with his faithful assistant, Nathan (Adam Kotz), in tow. At the same time, a rather nervous Caroline (Samantha Bond) checks in and quickly situates herself in the bar. Finally, Martin (Peter Wight) arrives with an odd request – he wants his son's ashes to be stored in the hotel safe. When this isn't an option, Jack enlists James to look after the ashes, and guard them with his life. But there's more to these guests than meets the eye. Ned proposes to Anna, but celebrations are cut short when Anna hears what she believes to be a gunshot. On learning that Jack and Emily are being held hostage in a room, Anna joins the gang in a daring plan to rescue them.

=== Series 4 (2009) ===
No. overall	No. in series	Title	Directed by	Written by	Original release date	Viewers (millions)
25	1	"Episode 1"	Andy Hay	Jack Williams	19 June 2009	4.72
The new series starts with Hotel Babylon closing down, due to a drop on the stock exchange in Tokyo, and when a terror attack strikes with a Hindi engagement party happening, Hotel Babylon's staff are pushed to their very limits by new manager. Meanwhile, the manager's ex-husband buys the hotel after they look after him. Also Anna is pregnant. They are having a sweepstakes on who is the father and Anna finds out and is very upset. At the very end of the episode the owner's fortune disappears because of the Credit Crunch – the only thing he has left is Hotel Babylon.
26	2	"Episode 2"	Andy Hay	Andy Rattenbury	26 June 2009	3.88
A celebrity TV couple are busy with their joint 40th birthday celebrations at the hotel. Anna assumes they are perfect together, but uncovers a very different story behind closed doors. Meanwhile, Sam learns the hard way that it is not easy running a hotel when he ignores Juliet's advice and allows rival boxers to stay at Babylon, and the staff rumble a corrupt environmental standards inspector.
27	3	"Episode 3"	Andy Hay	Dave Logan	3 July 2009	Under 3.65
The team joins a treasure hunt around the hotel searching for valuable emeralds claimed to be hidden at Babylon. Anna takes the lead despite being so close to having her baby. An old face from Hotel Babylon returns to sweep Anna off her feet. Elsewhere, Gino gets duped by a dangerous con man staying at the hotel and Tony is tasked to look after a fading film star who isn't everything she seems. Last appearance of Anna and Charlie.
28	4	"Episode 4"	Jim Loach	Marston Bloom	17 July 2009	Under 3.71
Emily's estranged father, Damien Rushby, turns up at Hotel Babylon for a poker tournament, but she doesn't want to see him. Sam and Juliet face a number of inspections during the tournament, and they are sure it's something to do with Damien. In order to get back at her father, Emily helps another participant win the game. However, Sam is pushed into a game of poker, where he gambles the hotel and his money too, which he loses to Emily's father. The gang all try to help get back the hotel, but it doesn't end the way they wanted it to.
29	5	"Episode 5"	Jim Loach	Darin Henry	24 July 2009	Under 3.58
Sam decides to enrol Juliet and the gang on a team-building course to improve their performance. Meanwhile, a convention is being held at Hotel Babylon, where Gino meets a woman called Mary that he falls in love with. Ben helps Martin Armstrong, an ex-presenter for kids television, by giving him a room, which Juliet finds out about and offers him a job interview as well. In the end, Juliet resigns after a fall out with Sam over Martin. He later finds out that the woman in charge of the course was out to get Juliet's job, and returns to Hotel Babylon.
30	6	"Episode 6"	Jim Loach	Jonathan Brackley & Sam Vincent	31 July 2009	Under 3.59
The Hotel is in preparation for their first royal wedding, but it's cancelled at the last minute. However, Sam convinces Juliet and the staff to pose as the wedding party, because he's relying on the magazine revenue to pay off a hefty tax bill. James's restaurant is thrown into chaos when a sprightly octogenarian joins the ranks. Elsewhere, a teenage swimming prodigy films a sportswear advert at Babylon, with her supportive manager parents in tow. Tony assumes they have their daughter's best interests at heart, until he discovers a different scenario. In the episode, Emily shares a kiss with Ben!
31	7	"Episode 7"	Andy Hay	Jess Williams	7 August 2009	3.71
James & Gino are asked to oversee the extravagant funeral of a VIP guest, Christiano Cucci, at Hotel Babylon. As a result, Juliet promises James a promotion to director of food if the event is a success, but he feels Gino is obstructing his dream so he fires him. Meanwhile, a baby shower is being held at the hotel, and Sam is asked to help organise it, which leads to a one night stand with one of the party guests! A woman (called Isobel) is up for the job as a receptionist, working alongside Ben, however she is beaten to it by Melanie Hughes, who convinces her to turn down the position.
32	8	"Episode 8"	Andy Hay	Jack Williams	14 August 2009	3.42
After a succession of intimate dates, Sam and Juliet begin to fall in love again, but the resurfacing of a buried truth soon threatens their reconciliation. It is Tony's turn to host a get-together for his fellow concierges at Hotel Babylon, but when he is called back to work, his colleagues decide to teach him a lesson he is unlikely to forget. Meanwhile, Mel struggles to keep up the pretence of being an experienced five-star receptionist; Juliet is becoming suspicious. Ben, James and Tanya decide to give her the make-over of a lifetime, but is it enough to convince Juliet that Mel's good enough for Babylon? One of Juliet's old friends from a divorce group, Karen (played by Michelle Collins), applies for a singles night held at the hotel, which later turns into disaster when it's revealed that Juliet aborted her baby that she conceived with Sam. And Gino sets out to find the author of an erotic novel found in the office printer! This episode was the last one of the series. It ended with Sam standing outside of Juliet's office, wondering whether he should pursue his relationship with his ex-wife or if he should move on and attempt a future with Emily. Viewers never found out the answer to his question as the show was not continued for a fifth series.

== Location ==
A zoom out from the hotel's location at the end of Series 1, Episode 4, reveals the location of the hotel as being at Cleveland House, 33 King Street, a short distance north of St. James's Park.

== Reception ==
The show achieved high ratings at around 5 million viewers each episode and winning its time slot. The programme often beat shows shown on other channels in the same time slot, such as Eleventh Hour, Footballers' Wives, and Ladette to Lady, all shown on ITV. Despite Tamzin Outhwaite's departure at the end of series 2, the show managed to maintain similar figures to the first two series during the first half of series 3. However, after Max Beesley's departure at the middle of series 3, the show saw a decline in figures from 5 to 4 million viewers.

The finale of the first series obtained 5.74 million viewers; the second series opened with 5.79 million before rising to 6.6 million viewers for episode 2. The fourth series opened with 4.28 million (20.1%).

== Home media releases ==
The DVDs are released by BBC Worldwide through 2 Entertain. Series One was released on DVD in the UK on 19 March 2007, and in the US and Canada on 12 February 2008. This series was also released in high definition in the UK on HD DVD (Combo disc) and Blu-ray Disc on 5 November 2007. Series Two was initially slated for release in the UK on 30 September 2007 but was released on 17 March 2008. Internationally, it was released on 14 February 2008 in Australia and 5 August 2008 in the US and Canada. Series Three was released on DVD in the US and Canada on 3 March 2009 (released before it premiered on BBC America). In the UK, it was on 13 July 2009. Series Four was released on DVD on 17 August 2009 in the UK.

All series have been released digitally in SD and HD via the iTunes Store in the UK.

== Soundtrack ==
Hotel Babylon: The Music

Soundtrack album by Jim Williams and John Lunn
- Released: 7 March 2008
- Recorded: 2008
- Genre: Television soundtrack
- Length: 54:45
- Label: Sony BMG
- Producers: Jim Williams, John Lunn

Hotel Babylon: The Music, a musical album, was released in March 2008, a few days after the third episode of series three. The soundtrack was produced by Jim Williams and John Lunn.

=== Track listing ===
All tracks are written by Williams and Lunn.

No.	Title	Length
1.	"The Babylon Suite"	3:53
2.	"City Nights"	4:29
3.	"Habanera Smile"	4:11
4.	"Café Rush"	4:44
5.	"Tuesday Club"	5:03
6.	"Shift"	4:29
7.	"Chelsea Girl"	4:34
8.	"Swimming Under Water"	5:09
9.	"Casino"	3:40
10.	"Thames Light"	5:01
11.	"Walking the Line"	4:39
12.	"A Different Life"	4:53
Total length:		54:45
