= Tamworth Two =

Two english pigs

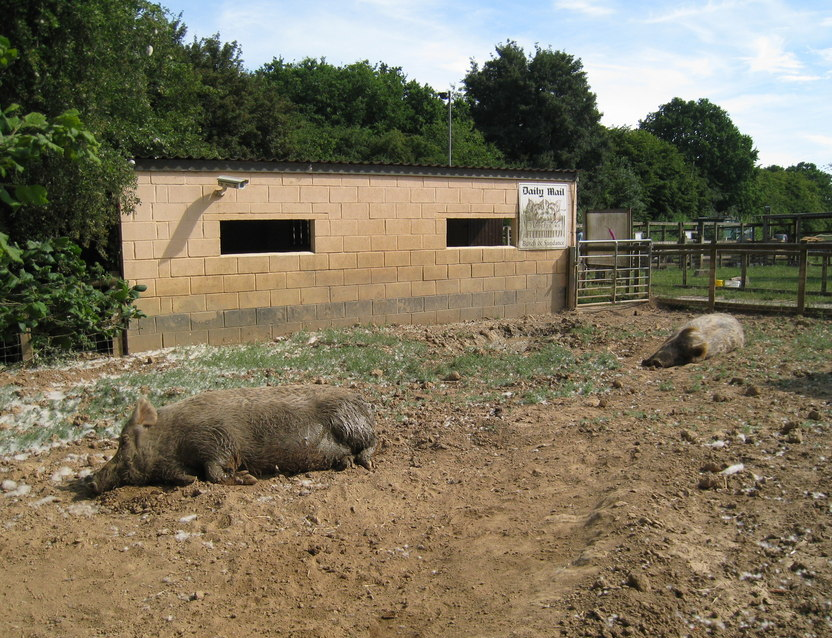
The Tamworth Two at their sanctuary in 2010

The Tamworth Two were a pair of pigs that escaped while being unloaded from a lorry at an abattoir in the English town of Malmesbury, Wiltshire in January 1998. The pigs (later named Butch and Sundance after Butch Cassidy and the Sundance Kid) were on the run for more than a week, and the search for them caused a huge media sensation, as well as immense public interest, both in Britain and abroad.

== Events ==
Butch (a sow) and Sundance (a boar) were sister and brother Tamworth pigs. Both were five months old when their owner took them by lorry to V & G Newman's Abattoir in Malmesbury on 8 January 1998. Just after they were unloaded from the truck, the two pigs escaped by squeezing through a fence and swimming across the River Avon, escaping into nearby gardens.

The two pigs spent most of their week of freedom in a dense thicket near Tetbury Hill. As the story of their escape broke, media interest in the escaped pigs soared across the country, the press dubbing the pair "Butch and Sundance" after the American outlaws. The American NBC network and several Japanese media outlets were among the international media to show a great interest in the story and to send reporters to cover the tale. The BBC reported on 16 January 1998: "Among nearly 100 journalists on the trail of the bolshy porker was NBC reporter Donatella Lorch, filming for Friday night's American news [who said]: ‘These pigs have become celebrities […] The British reaction to the whole thing is what has caught our attention and after all, we are the makers of Babe’".

The pigs were estimated to be worth £40–50 each, and their owner, Arnoldo Dijulio, a council road sweeper, stated that he still intended to send the pair to slaughter should they be recaptured. After making this statement, Dijulio was offered large sums of money by media outlets and animal lovers to save the pigs from the dinner table. Eventually, the Daily Mail newspaper bought the pigs from Dijulio in return for exclusive rights to their story.

Butch was eventually captured on the evening of 15 January, when she and Sundance were spotted foraging in the garden of a local couple, Harold and Mary Clarke. Sundance escaped into the thicket once again, but he was flushed out the next day by two springer spaniels and tranquilised with a dart gun. RSPCA Inspector Mike Harley said, "He had a very thick skin and two darts bounced off him". Sundance was taken to a veterinary surgery where the vet who examined him, Fran Baird, said: "He is a little bit shaky but doesn't appear to be any the worse for it. I am quite confident he will make a full recovery." He also said that Sundance would be spending the weekend at the surgery but that precautions had been taken to ensure he did not escape once more: "There are padlocks on the doors, which are more than six feet high and chained together. He's obviously quite bright. He's foxed a number of people for a number of days. I don't want to spend another day chasing around Malmesbury". Afterwards, it was discovered that Sundance was a crossbreed and that one of his parents had been a wild boar, possibly explaining his rebellious temperament.

The Tamworth Two even attracted observations in Parliament: ex-opposition Environment spokesman George Howarth compared the pair’s flight with that of the Conservative Party.

In June 2004, a campaign was launched to create a statue in Malmesbury to commemorate the Tamworth Two, together with a sculpture trail along the River Avon.

The two pigs lived at the Rare Breeds Centre, an animal sanctuary near Ashford in Kent. In 2009, readers of Press Gazette voted the Daily Mail’s coverage of the Tamworth Two 25th in a list of "the best British journalism scoops of all time". In March 2004, The Guardian reported a former Daily Mail executive as saying: "It may seem like a fun animal story, but at the time it was deadly serious. It was the most important story of the week – by far". The same report added: "It had become impossible to avoid the story. A contributor to Radio 4's Thought for the Day mused over them; the editor of The Independent, Andrew Marr, wrote about them in his letter to the readers. They even featured in an editorial in The Guardian".

The story of the Tamworth Two has been retold in media coverage of other animal escapes, including in December 2001 when a turkey escaped from a farm and walked three miles to a bird sanctuary and April 2009, when 180 pigs escaped from the lorry taking them to the Malton Bacon Factory in York after it was involved in an accident.

== Deaths ==
Butch died aged 13 on 8 October 2010, euthanised after becoming seriously ill. Davy McColm, manager of the centre's farm, put Butch’s demise down to old age. He added:

"Sundance seems to be quite happy with life at the moment. He's got a bit more space in the bed at night. He will be missing her. They were litter brother and sister, they've been together all their lives. He's an old fellow, he's a little bit arthritic and a bit slower than he used to be – thank goodness – but he's still pottering along".

At the time of Butch’s death, the centre was still receiving enquiries about the Tamworth Two.

Seven months later, Sundance, aged 14, suffering from arthritis, and "much quieter" after his sister's death, was euthanised on 23 May 2011. Commenting on Sundance’s death, Nikki Sara from the Rare Breeds Centre said: "He was getting old and was having trouble getting in and out of his bed. He was on the maximum dosage of pain killers and the farm manager decided that it wasn't fair on him". Talking about the Tamworth Two, she said: "They've been a great attraction here for the last 13 years, a real draw. We still get people coming in asking where they are".

== Television film ==
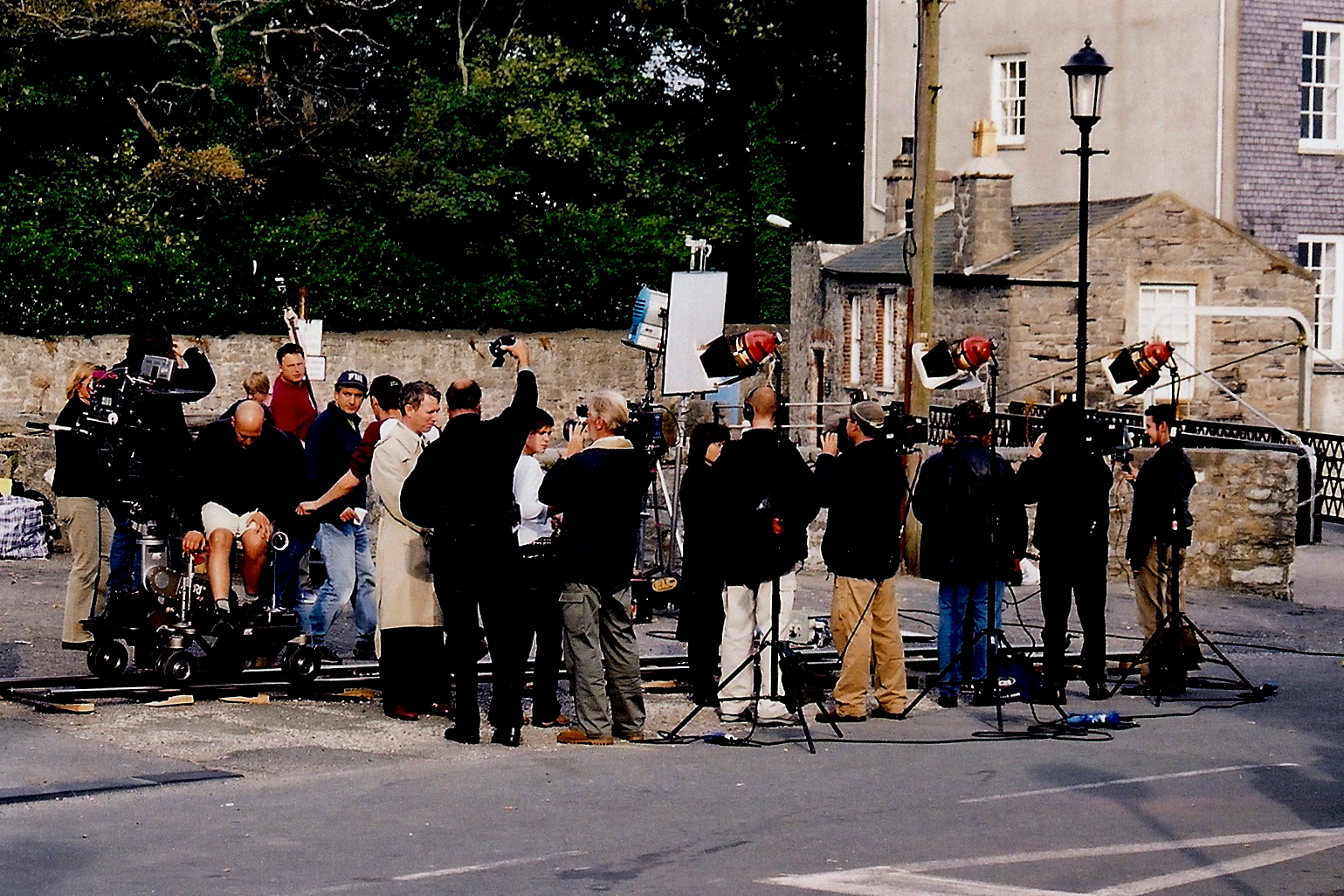
Filming of The Legend of the Tamworth Two

In 2003, the BBC produced and broadcast a 60-minute drama The Legend of the Tamworth Two where contrary to the truth, Butch was male, Sundance, female. Executive producer Sally Woodward told the BBC:

"The film tells how the story of Butch and Sundance became a legend, of how Britain once again took the underdog to their hearts – or in this instance, the under-pig – and in the process briefly made them the most famous fugitives in the world. It also shows how contrary human beings are in their relationship with animals – how we are only too happy to tuck in to a pork chop, but are outraged when we want to capture a pig that has stolen our heart".

== See also ==
- List of individual pigs
