= Babylon (Edwards-Jones series) =

Series of books by Imogen Edwards-Jones

The Babylon series is a series of books by British author Imogen Edwards-Jones which provide exposés of work places or industries using fictionalized characters enacting real incidents and stories based either on the author's own experiences, such as in Hotel Babylon, or on stories from anonymous insiders.

== Hotel Babylon ==
Hotel Babylon (2004) describes a fictional hour-by-hour account of life in a top London hotel over a 24-hour period. It exposes the exploits of the staff and guests alike. The BBC One series Hotel Babylon is based on this book.

== Air Babylon ==
Air Babylon (2005) describes as "a trawl through the highs, the lows, and the rapid descents of the travel industry". It combines various allegedly true incidents into a fictionalized day in the life of a duty manager at London Heathrow airport. The day ends with a plane journey from London to Dubai. In October 2007 it was announced that Carnival Films had begun development on a television adaptation of the book.

== Fashion Babylon ==
Fashion Babylon (2006) explores the world of fashion. The book follows the life and times of a small fashion house based in London. Over a six-month period from the day after the house's fashion show in London to their next season, the narrator describes the journey for producing a new fashion collection.

The book was adapted for television in 2010 as Material Girl.

== Beach Babylon ==
Beach Babylon (2007) is about the beach resort industry.

== Pop Babylon ==
Pop Babylon (2008) covers the year in the making of a boy band.

== Wedding Babylon ==
Wedding Babylon (2009) explores the wedding industry. The book lifts the veil on the excesses of the wedding industry - the scams which inflate the prices of everything from flowers to cakes to marquee hire and the wedding disaster stories of high jinxing at the altar and disastrous low comedy in the speeches.

It highlights how the potential for things to go horribly wrong is never higher than at a wedding and how the dream day is never far from becoming a nightmare.

Wedding Babylon follows the style of Hotel Babylon and Air Babylon. The book is published by Bantam Press.

== Hospital Babylon ==
Hospital Babylon (2011) is about 24 hours in an Emergency Department.

== Restaurant Babylon ==
Restaurant Babylon (2012) is about incidents from a number of top restaurants.
