= Armstrong and Miller (disambiguation) =

Armstrong and Miller are a British comedy double act.

Armstrong and Miller may also refer to:

- Armstrong and Miller (TV series), Paramount Comedy and Channel 4 television comedy sketch series, later retitled The Armstrong and Miller Show
- Armstrong and Miller (radio show), radio comedy sketch show

== See also ==
- The Armstrong & Miller Show, BBC television comedy sketch series
