= Sarah Alexander =

English actress (born 1971)

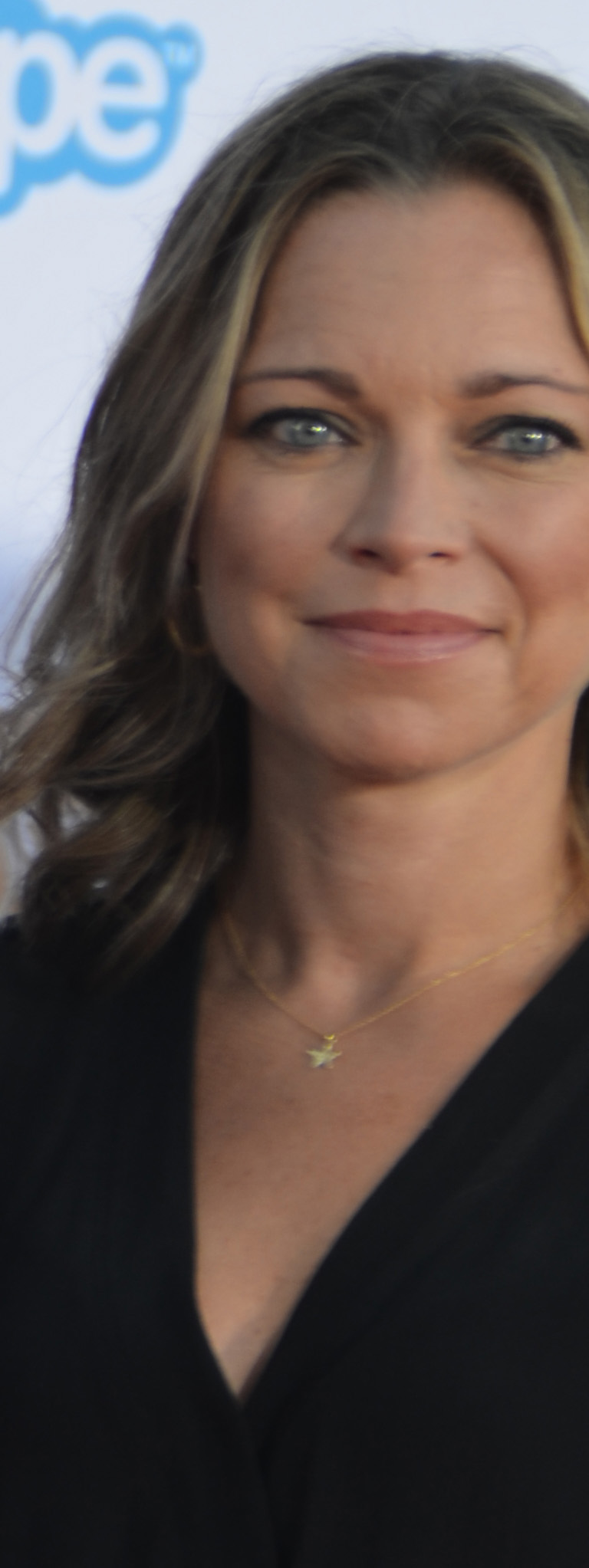
- Alexander in 2014
- Born: Sarah Smith; 3 January 1971 (age 55); Hammersmith, West London, England
- Occupation: Actress
- Years active: 1989–present
- Spouse: Peter Serafinowicz (sep. 2025)
- Children: 2

Sarah Smith (born 3 January 1971), known professionally as Sarah Alexander, is an English actress. She has appeared in British series including Armstrong and Miller, Smack the Pony, Coupling, The Worst Week of My Life, Green Wing, Marley's Ghosts and Jonathan Creek.

== Early life ==
Alexander was born on 3 January 1971 in Hammersmith, London. Her father, Frank Smith, was a television producer and director on factual shows such as Panorama; he died when she was still at school. She attended Godolphin and Latymer School in Hammersmith. At the age of 19, she left home after her A-levels and travelled to the Edinburgh Festival Fringe to get a start in acting. Her parents wanted her to continue to university, but she turned down a place at the University of Manchester to take her first professional acting job.

== Career ==
In 1992, Alexander appeared in The Bill, as a witness to an attempted robbery. The following year she played Muriel in an episode of the BBC comedy-drama Lovejoy. In 1994, she played Nicky, Damien's risk-addicted weather reporter girlfriend in Drop the Dead Donkey. In 1996, she played Beatrice in the British première of Octavio Paz's only play, Rappaccini's Daughter, at the Gate Theatre Studio. She has appeared in other theatre productions, including The Vagina Monologues, Hand in Hand, The Secretary Bird, Northanger Abbey, and as Lady Macbeth in Macbeth. In the mid-1990s, she met Ben Miller when they filmed an advertisement for disposable cameras together, and through him she met Alexander Armstrong. Miller and Armstrong became friends and collaborators, and Alexander went on to appear on their Channel 4 sketch show Armstrong and Miller (1997–2001), usually in the regular "Nude Practice" segment.

Alexander moved into comedy acting, in which she has since specialised. Her other sketch show work included Smith and Jones (1997–1998) and Smack the Pony (1999–2003), also writing for the latter. In the science-fiction comedy series Red Dwarf, she played the Queen of Camelot in "Stoke Me a Clipper". She appeared in the Midsomer Murders episode "The Garden of Death", as Fliss Inkpen-Thomas. In 2000, she appeared in the comedy The Strangerers, as well as becoming co-host of the final series of the current-affairs satire The 11 O'Clock Show, alongside Jon Holmes. She made her debut as Susan Walker in the BBC sitcom Coupling, which ran for four series from 2000 to 2004. Other British TV roles included Mel in The Worst Week of My Life and Angela Hunter in the hospital comedy Green Wing.

Alexander appeared as Alice Fletcher in NBC's short-lived remake of the British comedy series Teachers, before roles in the films I Could Never Be Your Woman and Stardust (both released in 2007). Her previous film credits include Seaview Knights (1994) and Going Off Big Time (2000). She also starred in the 2008 BBC dramedy Mutual Friends, and played Layla Barton in the BBC drama All The Small Things, which debuted in 2009.

Since 2011, she has played Mimi in the BBC Radio 4 comedy series The Gobetweenies. The first series was broadcast in 2011 and two more followed in 2012 and 2013. She starred in the 2012 BBC series Me and Mrs Jones. Since 2013, she has starred in the BBC One series Jonathan Creek as Polly Creek, wife of main character Jonathan, making her first appearance in the episode titled "The Clue of the Savant's Thumb" in 2013. She starred in the Dave comedy Undercover as DS Zoe Keller. In 2015–2016 she starred in the comedy series Marley's Ghosts on Gold. In 2019, she appeared as Undine Thwaite in the Epix series Pennyworth.

== Other work ==
Alexander has contributed to the BBC charity telethon Comic Relief, appearing in 2001 as a judge based on Nicki Chapman in a parody of Popstars, in 2003 as Liza Goddard in a spoof of Blankety Blank, and, in 2005, in a celebrity version of University Challenge. Since 2021, she has contributed to Mark Steel's podcast "What the F*** Is Going On?", appearing in sketches as "woman overheard in cafe", "tory MP Nadine Boris", and "phone-in show caller".

== Personal life ==
In 2001, aged 30, Alexander began a relationship with 72-year-old actor Gerald Harper. The following year, she left him for actor Peter Serafinowicz, whom she later married. They lived in west London and have two children together. Alexander and Serafinowicz separated in 2025 after 23 years.

== Filmography ==
=== Film ===
Year	Film	Role	Notes
1993	Pretty Princess	Ursula	Original title: Piccolo Grande Amore
1994	Seaview Knights	Jackie	
1999	The New Adventures of Pinocchio	Felinet	Direct-to-Video
2000	Summer in the Suburbs	Maisie	TV film
2000	Going Off Big Time	Stacey Bannerman	
2001	Bridget Jones's Diary	Daniel Cleaver's Lover	Uncredited
2004	Perfect Strangers	Alix Mason	TV film
2005	Harry	Kay	Short film
2007	I Could Never Be Your Woman	Jeannie	
2007	Stardust	Empusa	
2011	Faculty	Ellie Anderson	TV film
2015	We're Doomed! The Dad's Army Story	Gilda Perry	
2020	Sassy Justice	Julie Andrews	Video short
2022	The Silent Canary	Jane	Short film

=== Television ===
Year	Film	Role	Notes
1992	The Bill	Lesley Anderson	Episode: "Exit"
1992	Kappatoo	Melanie	Series regular, 7 episodes
1992	Natural Lies	Anne-Marie	1 episode
1992	Covington Cross	Third Girl	Episode: "The Hero"
1993	Lovejoy	Muriel	Episode: "Second Fiddle"
1993	You, Me and It	Emma	1 episode
1993	Chris Cross	Sam	Episode: "Turf Wars"
1994	Anna Lee	Mary Vincent	Episode: "The Cook's Tale"
1994	The Bill	Madeline Dexter	Episode: "Wild Justice"
1994	Drop the Dead Donkey	Nicky	Episode: "Damien and the Weather Girl"
1997	Red Dwarf	Queen	Episode: "Stoke Me a Clipper"
1997–1998	Alas Smith and Jones	Various roles	Recurring role, 12 episodes
1998	Noel's House Party	Girl at the Window	Recurring role, 4 episodes
1999	Tilly Trotter	Lady Agnes Myton	Miniseries, 2 episodes
1999	People Like Us	Madeline Goddard	Episode: "The Estate Agent"
1999–2003	Smack the Pony	Various roles	Series regular, 23 episodes
2000	The Strangerers	Rina	Series regular, 9 episodes
2000	Midsomer Murders	Fliss Inkpen-Thomas	Episode: "Garden of Death"
2000–2004	Coupling	Susan Walker	Series regular, 28 episodes
2001	Armstrong and Miller	Various roles	Recurring role, 7 episodes
2001	Dr. Terrible's House of Horrible	Beatrice Crown	Episode: "Voodoo Feet of Death"
2002	Look Around You	Scientist	2 episodes
2003	Comic Relief 2003: The Big Hair Do	'Lovely' Liza Goddard	TV special
2004–2006	Green Wing	Dr. Angela Hunter	Series regular, 13 episodes
2004–2007	The Worst Week of My Life	Mel Cook	Series regular, 17 episodes
2005	Look Around You	Ros Lamb	Episode: "Sport"
2006	Teachers	Alice Fletcher	Series regular, 6 episodes
2007	The Peter Serafinowicz Show	Various roles	2 episodes
2008	Mutual Friends	Liz	Series regular, 6 episodes
2009	All the Small Things	Layla	Series regular, 6 episodes
2010	Agatha Christie's Marple	Lydia Harsnet	Episode: "The Pale Horse"
2011	The Jury	Theresa Vestry	Series regular, 5 episodes
2011	The Gobetweenies	Mimi	Recurring role, 4 episodes
2012	Me and Mrs Jones	Gemma Jones	Series regular, 6 episodes
2013–2016	Jonathan Creek	Polly Creek	Recurring role, 5 episodes
2015	Undercover	Zoe	Series regular, 6 episodes
2015–2016	Marley's Ghosts	Marley Wise	Series regular, 9 episodes
2016	Drunk History	Elizabeth I	Episode: "Battle of Trafalgar/The Virgin Queen"
2019	Pennyworth	Undine Thwaite	Series regular, 6 episodes
2024	Father Brown	Harriet Sykes	Episode: "The Last Supper"
2025	Art Detectives	Rosa Conaghan	Recurring role, 4 episodes
2026	The Marlow Murder Club	Sophia	2 episodes
2026	The Forsytes	Alexandra Falconer	Series regular, 5 episodes (series 2)
