= Children's Hour with Armstrong and Miller =

- Genre: Comedy (spoof, parody)
- Running time: 30 mins
- Country of origin: United Kingdom
- Language: English
- Home station: BBC Radio 4
- Syndicates: BBC Radio 4 Extra
- Starring: Alexander Armstrong; Ben Miller; Charlie Condou; Melissa Lloyd; Tony Gardner; Jamie Theakston
- Written by: Armstrong and Miller; Mitchell and Webb
- Produced by: Jon Rolph
- Original release: 2 December – 30 December 1998
- No. of series: 1
- No. of episodes: 4
- Audio format: Stereo
- Website: www.bbc.co.uk/programmes/b00fqh9v

Children's Hour with Armstrong and Miller is a British four-part comedy programme broadcast on BBC Radio 4 between 2 December 1998 and 30 December 1998. It stars Alexander Armstrong and Ben Miller as media journalists. Armstrong is almost unrecognisable as the adenoidal Martin Bain-Jones with Miller playing Craig (often misnamed Crag) Children in a spoof music/children's/cultural review programme. No episode was broadcast on 23 December 1998 due to extended news coverage.

Each episode would see them attempting to get a scoop on the opposition by visiting various events such as music festivals and media parties; although most of the time they ended up making fools of themselves – on one occasion attempting to interview a non-existent band called Atering-Catering-Cat.

Their nemesis – Andy Thomas – "with his frightful show on Radio 1", is a constant throughout the four programmes, and would always upstage them and do his best to interfere with their plans, such as by stealing their passes for the Leeds music festival. Another constant is Peter Davies (aged 47), an obsessed fan who always manages to cross their paths.

The series bears repeated listening, with many subtle lines, but at times can be a little confusing as it goes backwards and forwards in time, segued by records that they play on their show. There are also many instances of innuendo, typically when the records end. One typical line from Bain-Jones is "... and I said no it won't, as it's water-based...", before realising they are on air again.
