= White Winter Hymnal =

Single by Fleet Foxes

from the album Fleet Foxes
- A-side: "White Winter Hymnal"
- B-side: "Isles"
- Released: July 21, 2008
- Recorded: 2007
- Genre: Folk
- Length: 2:27
- Label: Bella Union
- Songwriter: Robin Pecknold
- Producer: Phil Ek

Fleet Foxes singles chronology
"White Winter Hymnal" (2008)	"He Doesn't Know Why" (2008)

"White Winter Hymnal" is the first single from Fleet Foxes' debut 2008 self-titled album. Released by European label Bella Union on July 21, 2008, the single was issued on 7" vinyl as well as digital MP3 format. The B-side is the non-album track "Isles".

== Background ==
Former Cocteau Twins bassist Simon Raymonde, the head of record label Bella Union, was considering shutting the label down due to financial troubles, but after hearing a demo version of "White Winter Hymnal", he was motivated to continue going on and signed Fleet Foxes to the label based on how much he liked the song.

== Track listing ==
All songs written by Robin Pecknold.

1. "White Winter Hymnal" – 2:27
2. "Isles" – 3:06

== Critical reception ==
Time critic Josh Tyrangiel named this the #5 song of 2008. Pitchfork Media ranked it the #2 song of 2008 and #66 on their decade end list.

== Covers and use in media ==
"White Winter Hymnal" has been covered by several artists and featured in other media.

It was covered by ARORA on the album Sonosings (2009). It also appeared on Birdy's debut album Birdy (2011) and Kina Grannis's album Stairwells (2011).

In 2010, the song was parodied by The Fringemunks to recap Fringe episode 2.20, "Northwest Passage".

British vocalist Kim Wilde released a version on her 2013 Christmas album Wilde Winter Songbook, performed with her father Marty Wilde and brother Ricky Wilde.

In 2014 it was also covered by a cappella group Pentatonix on their album That's Christmas to Me. A performance similar to this rendition is featured in "Belly of the Beast," the seventh episode of Season 1 of Matlock.

In the eighth season of Danish TV series X Factor, it was covered by group Ivarsson, Bang & Neumann.

The song is used in the opening credits to the Hulu series, The Path. It also appears on the soundtrack for the 2015 movie Love the Coopers.

Phish performed an a cappella version as part of their 2017 "Baker’s Dozen" residency at Madison Square Garden.

In 2017, British television presenter and singer Alexander Armstrong covered the song on his Christmas album, In a Winter Light.

In 2021, this song was used for the Spanish Christmas Lottery commercial.

In 2024, this song was featured in the Netflix original series Sweet Tooth in season 3, episode 3.

== Certifications ==
Certifications for "White Winter Hymnal"
Region	Certification	Certified units/sales
New Zealand (RMNZ)	Gold	15,000^{‡}
United Kingdom (BPI)	Silver	200,000^{‡}
United States (RIAA)	Platinum	1,000,000^{‡}
^{‡} Sales+streaming figures based on certification alone.
