= In a Winter Light =

Studio album by Alexander Armstrong
- Released: 24 November 2017
- Genre: Vocal; easy listening
- Label: Rhino; East West
- Producer: Simon Franglen

Alexander Armstrong chronology
Upon a Different Shore (2016)	In a Winter Light (2017)

In a Winter Light is the third studio album by English comedian and actor Alexander Armstrong. It was released on 24 November 2017 as Armstrong's first Christmas album, and was recorded with the City of Prague Orchestra, Choir of New College Oxford, RAF Squadronaires Big Band and Jools Holland. It peaked at number 24 on the UK Albums Chart, achieving less commercial success than his first two albums. In a Winter Light contains two compositions written by Armstrong himself, "I Still Believe In Christmas" and "This Glorious Morrow".

== Track listing ==
No.	Title	Length
1.	"Angels in a Winter Light" (Prologue, Instrumental)	1:12
2.	"White Winter Hymnal"	1:49
3.	"The Christmas Song (Chestnuts Roasting on an Open Fire)"	3:09
4.	"This Glorious Morrow" (featuring The Choir of New College Oxford)	3:51
5.	"Let It Snow" (featuring Trebles of The Choir of New College Oxford)	2:03
6.	"I Still Believe in Christmas"	3:38
7.	"O Holy Night" (featuring Trebles of The Choir of New College Oxford)	4:56
8.	"Little Girl Blue" (featuring Jools Holland)	4:08
9.	"Girl in the Dark" (Instrumental Interlude)	1:18
10.	"Silent Night" (featuring The Royal Air Force Squadronaires)	3:17
11.	"There Is No Rose"	3:14
12.	"Winter Wonderland" (featuring The Royal Air Force Squadronaires)	2:18
13.	"In the Bleak Midwinter"	4:11
14.	"Bethlehem Down"	4:12
15.	"A Spotless Rose" (featuring The Choir of New College Oxford)	3:23
16.	"Angels in a Winter Light" (Epilogue, Instrumental)	1:09

== Critical reception ==
In a Winter Light was met with mainly positive reviews from the professional arts journalism website The Arts Desk, who called it "a pleasantly traditional affair". They said, "Unfortunately, Armstrong's baritone is not suited to everything. Take "White Winter Hymnal" by Fleet Foxes. The original was an ethereal piece of folk-rock. This choral version is so mannered it's almost like an Armstrong and Miller comedy sketch."

== Charts ==
Chart (2017)	Peak position
UK Albums (OCC)	24
