= The Children's Hour =

The Children's Hour may refer to:

== Literature ==
- The Children's Hour (play), a 1934 stage play by Lillian Hellman
- "The Children's Hour" (poem), 1860, by Henry Wadsworth Longfellow
- The Children's Hour, a 1953 set of children's books edited by Marjorie Barrows
- The Children's Hour, a novelette by Jerry Pournelle and S.M. Stirling in the Man-Kzin Wars series
  - The Children's Hour, a novel expansion of the Man-Kzin Wars novelette
- The Children's Hour (Australian magazine), published by S.A. Education Department
- The Children's Hour, a magazine published by T. S. Arthur & Son, Philadelphia in the 1870s
- Arthur Mee's Children's Hour (1928), an anthology by Arthur Mee

== Film and television ==
- The Children's Hour (film) (1961), an adaptation of the Hellman play
- These Three (1936), an adaptation of the Hellman play
- The Children's Hour (TV program), a US TV series 1970–1992

== Radio ==
- The Children's Hour (Children's Hour), a 1922–1964 BBC radio programme
- The Children's Hour (Australian radio)
- The Children's Hour (radio comedy), BBC Radio 4
- The Horn and Hardart Children's Hour (The Children's Hour), a 1920s–1950s US radio and TV program

== Music ==
- "The Children's Hour", a song for voice & piano by Charles Ives
- Children's Hour, New Zealand band that became the Headless Chickens
