= It's Not Rocket Science =

British television show

- Presented by: Rachel Riley; Ben Miller; Romesh Ranganathan
- Starring: Dr. Kevin Fong
- Country of origin: United Kingdom
- Original language: English
- No. of series: 1
- No. of episodes: 6

Production
- Running time: 60 minutes (inc. adverts)

Original release
- Network: ITV
- Release: 16 February – 22 March 2016

It's Not Rocket Science is a British television show that aired on ITV in 2016. It was presented by Rachel Riley, Ben Miller, and Romesh Ranganathan. The resident scientist was Kevin Fong.

== Episodes ==
The first series aired from 16 February until 22 March 2016. Negative reviews and low ratings resulted in the series not being recommissioned.

Episode	Original air date	Features	Guests
1	16 February 2016	Joey Essex tries to drive a car controlled by his thoughts and sprinter Adam Gemili attempts to outrun a Red Arrows jet.	Joey Essex, Luther Burrell and Adam Gemili
2	23 February 2016	Romesh attempts to beat a drone in a delivery van driven by rally driver Elfyn Evans. Ben is strapped inside a wrecking ball set on a course to hit Romesh and observes an experiment to simulate an explosion in space.	Elfryn Evans
3	1 March 2016	Rachel learns what life in space is like for British astronaut Tim Peake. Romesh is saved from being crushed by a falling fridge by the effect of friction. Eamonn Holmes and Ben launch rockets to prove that sugar can be an effective fuel.	Eamonn Holmes, Tim Peake and Calum Chambers
4	8 March 2016	An attempt is made to break the world record for bursting balloons with a laser. Rachel helps conduct an experiment to investigate the placebo effect and Ben meets a friendly robot.	
5	15 March 2016	Rachel visits a team building a car that they hope will be able to reach a speed of 1,000 mph. Ben survives being shot at with a flaming arrow.	Andy Green
6	22 March 2016	Rachel rides a bicycle along a tightrope sixty feet above the ground. Ben visits Germany to see nuclear fusion.	
