= Alexander Armstrong's Big Ask =

- Genre: Comedy
- Written by: Dan Gaster; Will Ing; Paul Powell; Steve Punt
- Directed by: Geraldine Dowd
- Presented by: Alexander Armstrong
- Starring: Dave Lamb (series 1)
- Country of origin: United Kingdom
- Original language: English
- No. of series: 2
- No. of episodes: 15

Production
- Production location: The London Studios
- Production companies: So Television; Black Dog Television

Original release
- Network: Dave
- Release: 30 May 2011 – 9 April 2013

Alexander Armstrong's Big Ask is a British comedy panel show hosted by Alexander Armstrong. The pilot was shown on Dave on 30 May 2011. The guests on the pilot were Robert Webb, Katy Brand and Griff Rhys Jones. After a positive reaction to the pilot, Dave ordered a full series which was filmed in October 2011 and broadcast from 6 February 2012. A second series began 26 February 2013.

== Series overview ==
Series	Episodes	Originally released	
Series	Episodes	First released	Last released
Pilot		30 May 2011	
1	6	6 February 2012	19 February 2013
2	7	26 February 2013	9 April 2013

== Episodes ==
=== Pilot (2011) ===
No. overall	No. in series	Guests	Original release date
1	Pilot	Katy Brand, Griff Rhys Jones, Robert Webb	30 May 2011

=== Series 1 (2012–13) ===
No. overall	No. in series	Guests	Original release date
2	1	Marcus Brigstocke, Graham Norton, Sandi Toksvig	6 February 2012
3	2	Jimmy Carr, Rufus Hound, Andi Osho	13 February 2012
4	3	Ed Byrne, Russell Kane, Mark Watson	20 February 2012
5	4	Clive Anderson, Sue Perkins, Daniel Sloss	27 February 2012
6	5	Jimmy Carr, Andrew Maxwell, Robert Webb	5 March 2012
7	6	Russell Kane, Andy Parsons, Steve Punt	12 March 2012
8	7	Series 1 Compilation Show	19 February 2013

=== Series 2 (2013) ===
No. overall	No. in series	Guests	Original release date
9	8	Jo Brand, Stephen Mangan, Tim Vine	26 February 2013
10	9	Marcus Brigstocke, Ed Byrne, Jack Whitehall	5 March 2013
11	10	Susan Calman, Reginald D. Hunter, Russell Kane	12 March 2013
12	11	Clive Anderson, Rebecca Front, Mark Steel	19 March 2013
13	12	Phill Jupitus, Andrew Maxwell, Jack Whitehall	26 March 2013
14	13	Clive Anderson, Jason Manford, Sandi Toksvig	2 April 2013
15	14	Series 2 Compilation Show	9 April 2013
