= Rex Armstrong =

English rugby union player

Reginald "Rex" Armstrong OBE (6 December 1897 – 17 February 1968) was a rugby union international prop who represented England in one international during 1925.

Armstrong was born in Newcastle upon Tyne and educated at the Newcastle University Medical School. He played for Durham Medicals, Northumberland and the Barbarians. During World War II he served with the RAMC and was awarded the OBE in 1944. In 1967 he became the first doctor to describe Foot-and-mouth disease in man in the UK. He died in Morpeth.

He was the grandfather of comedian and television presenter Alexander Armstrong.
