= Seaview Knights =

Seaview Knights is a 1994 British comedy film directed by Richard Kurti and starring James Bolam, Sarah Alexander and Clive Darby.

== Premise ==
King Arthur and the knights of the round table wake up to find themselves in modern Blackpool.

== Cast ==
- Sarah Alexander ... Jackie
- James Bolam ... Merlin
- Abigail Canton ... Whiplash
- Clive Darby ... Arthur
- Anita Dobson ... The Blind Concierge
- Hildegarde Neil ... The Psychiatrist
- Gary Tippings ... Lancelot
