= The Worst Week of My Life =

British TV sitcom (2004–06)

- Series title card
- Created by: Mark Bussell; Justin Sbresni
- Starring: Sarah Alexander; Ben Miller; Alison Steadman; Geoffrey Whitehead
- Country of origin: United Kingdom
- Original language: English
- No. of series: 3
- No. of episodes: 17

Production
- Executive producers: Cheryl Tayor; Mark Freeland
- Producer: Hat Trick Productions
- Running time: 30 minutes

Original release
- Network: BBC One
- Release: 12 March 2004 – 22 December 2006

The Worst Week of My Life is a British television sitcom, first broadcast on BBC One between March and April 2004. A second series was aired between November and December 2005 and a three-part Christmas special, The Worst Christmas of My Life was shown during December 2006. It was written by Mark Bussell and Justin Sbresni.

== Plotline ==
=== Series one ===
Essentially a comedy of errors, The Worst Week of My Life follows the premise that "anything that can go wrong, will go wrong". The story covers the week preceding the marriage of publishing executive Howard Steel and his fiancée Mel, the daughter of a high-court judge, Dick Cook. Humiliating situations ensue: Cassie, a colleague with whom Howard had a drunken one-night stand two years earlier, sets out to snare him and becomes obsessive; Howard accidentally kills his in-laws' dog, puts Mel's granny in hospital and loses the wedding ring (a family heirloom). At the end of the first series, Howard and Mel were wed, despite the many mishaps that had befallen the well-meaning but accident-prone groom.

=== Series two ===
The second series takes place in the week leading up to the birth of Howard and Mel's first baby, with Howard still a walking accident zone. With his father blowing up granny's cottage, into which the married couple were preparing to move, they stay with his wife's parents once again. During the course of the week, he is accused of sexual harassment at work, and mistakenly arrested for 'dogging'. He also manages to toast his father-in-law's CBE on a barbecue. Despite Howard knocking out the midwife, the series ends with the birth of a baby girl, Emily.

=== The Worst Christmas of My Life ===
A three-part Christmas special entitled The Worst Christmas of My Life was shown on BBC One in December 2006.

==== Episode One ====
Set: 23 December: (aired 19 December 2006)

After his office Christmas party, Howard takes his intoxicated boss Nicola in a cab to her home, after realising she's not fit to drive. During the cab ride, she vomits on him and, after taking a shower at her place, he is forced outside naked by Nicola, after she mistakes his nakedness for preparation to rape her. Howard turns up naked on his in-laws' doorstep, and proceeds to urinate on the Christmas goose after the power goes out, leading to a series of events which culminate in his falsely claiming to his wife and mother-in-law that his father-in-law is dead. Later, he crashes into his father-in-law, drags his unconscious body inside, causes his mother-in-law to faint, makes his wife suspicious about his naked escapade the previous night when Nicola apologises and returns his clothes, and finally destroys his wife's childhood dollhouse, which was to be a gift to their newborn daughter, while attempting to fix the damaged fuse that led to him urinating on the goose initially.

==== Episode Two ====
Set: 24 December: (aired 21 December 2006)

With Dick continuing to receive wreaths and read obituaries following his "death", his contempt for Howard deepens further when he discovers Howard bought a new car with the money he was expecting to receive from the will. A freak accident involving a strimmer leads to family friend Felicity's pedigree dog, who is regularly put out to stud, losing a testicle, with Howard once more taking the blame. He then takes baby Emily Christmas shopping in the local shopping centre, where he gets in a fight with a drunken Father Christmas and accidentally ends up pushing around the wrong pushchair. He eventually manages to swap the prams back and return the baby to its black parents and reclaim Emily, but Howard's despair is not over yet as he spills mulled wine over the local Vicar when he visits the house. Howard's visit to church on Christmas Eve sees him get in argument with Fraser over his refusal to publish his memoirs and another fight – this time with Eve's new love, Mitch, who Howard saw kissing another woman at the office Christmas party.

==== Episode Three ====
Set: 25 December: (aired 22 December 2006)

Howard receives a visit from police on Christmas morning following his fight with Mitch, while Eve is attempting suicide in the house and Fraser is accusing him of stealing his bagpipes. Meanwhile, Howard offers to help Dick repair the dollhouse but quickly the pair are glued together as their visitors, the Bledlow family (including Mel's ex-boyfriend, Ed), call in for Christmas lunch. With Howard fretting about a missing condom of his that the family dog took from his room earlier, he spots it and leaves the meal to try and reclaim it. But he ends up setting fire to the front room, damaging the presents that were to be opened after lunch.

== Main characters ==
Geoffrey Whitehead as Dick Cook on the receiving end of one of Howard's many mishaps.

- Ben Miller as Howard Steel, the hapless male lead. A book publisher by trade, Howard continually puts himself in dreadful situations and makes things worse by trying to either put things right or explain what had happened.
- Sarah Alexander as Mel Cook, Howard's fiancée and then wife, who remains in love with him despite his mishaps. However, Mel (who works as a vet) gradually loses patience with him as the story arc in each series progresses.
- Alison Steadman as Angela Cook, Mel's mother. Her main role in life appears to be to entertain guests at her country home, regularly worrying about the impression that will be set following Howard-led problems. Regardless of Howards's faults, Angela often tries to see the good in him and is friendlier to Howard than Dick. Whereas Dick doesn't understand why Mel loves Howard, Angela can see that the pair love each other and in the series one finale, Angela defends Howard after Dick refuses to give him the car keys to rescue Mel.
- Geoffrey Whitehead as Dick Cook, a High Court judge and Mel's father. He has little time for Howard and struggles to understand why Mel wanted to marry him.
- Janine Duvitski as Eve, Howard's assistant. She devotes much of her life to her work and has little social life outside helping Howard.
- Ronald Pickup as Fraser Cook, Dick's brother. Obsessed by his days in the army, Fraser will regularly offer rather pointless advice about life. He is initially a closet homosexual but finally comes out in Series 2 while in a relationship with his "travelling companion" Gerard (Terrence Hardiman).

=== Minor characters ===
- Raquel Cassidy as Cassie Turner, Howard's stalking co-worker who he had a one-night stand with (series 1). She is unable to accept he wants to marry Mel and goes to any length possible to try and marry him instead.
- Emma Pierson as Sophie Cook, Mel's troublesome younger sister (series 1). She asks Howard for relationship advice and then strongly criticises him when things do not work out. She is not in series 2 with no explanation as to her absence, however in The Worst Christmas of My Life (third series) it is revealed that she has moved to New Zealand when Howard talks to her over the phone.
- Dean Lennox Kelly as Dom, Howard and Eve's misogynistic co-worker and Howard's eventual best man. He develops a relationship with Mel's younger sister, Sophie in series one. At the end of series one Sophie announces to her parents that she and Dom are going to marry, to her parents' dismay. He does not appear in series two and similarly to Sophie, there is no explanation to his absence, but he is mentioned when Eve gives Howard his office desk items that he left.
- John Benfield as Ron Steel, Howard's laddish father. He has a lap dancer girlfriend, Trish, played by Lizzie Roper (series 1).
- Kim Wall as Mitch, Eve's new boyfriend (series 3). Eve quickly announces her plans to marry him but Howard feels compelled to tell her he saw him kissing another woman at the office Christmas party. Howard and Mitch end up fighting with nativity figures at Midnight Mass.
- Paul Brooke as the Vicar, who finds Howard hard work when preparing to carry out his wedding (series 1). After Emily is born, Angela and Dick are keen for her christening to be held at Winchester Cathedral and believe setting a good impression to the Vicar (a personal friend to the Bishop) when he calls on Christmas Eve (series 3) will seal their wishes. But Howard spills mulled wine over the Vicar, who has to be undressed to receive treatment.
- Terrence Hardiman as Gerard, Fraser's lover (series 2). Howard first meets him in the bath with Fraser. He leaves mid-way through the week in an effort to make Frazer tell the family about his homosexuality. He later returns for the last episode.
- Lizzie Roper as Trish, Ron Steel's lap dancer girlfriend (series 1). In series 2 it is revealed that she left Ron for his carpet fitter.

== Episode list ==
=== Series 1 ===
No. overall	No. in series	Title	Original release date
1	1	"Monday"	12 March 2004
2	2	"Tuesday"	19 March 2004
3	3	"Wednesday"	26 March 2004
4	4	"Thursday"	2 April 2004
5	5	"Friday"	9 April 2004
6	6	"Saturday"	16 April 2004
7	7	"Sunday"	23 April 2004

=== Series 2 ===
No. overall	No. in series	Title	Original release date
8	1	"Monday"	17 November 2005
9	2	"Tuesday"	24 November 2005
10	3	"Wednesday"	1 December 2005
11	4	"Thursday"	8 December 2005
12	5	"Friday"	15 December 2005
13	6	"Saturday"	22 December 2005
14	7	"Sunday"	29 December 2005

=== Series 3 ===
No. overall	No. in series	Title	Directed by	Written by	Original release date
15	1	"Episode 1"	Mark Bussell & Justin Sbresni	Mark Bussell & Justin Sbresni	19 December 2006
16	2	"Episode 2"	Mark Bussell & Justin Sbresni	Mark Bussell & Justin Sbresni	21 December 2006
17	3	"Episode 3"	Mark Bussell & Justin Sbresni	Mark Bussell & Justin Sbresni	22 December 2006

== Reception ==
The series were both critically acclaimed and popular, with the first series averaging 5 million viewers on BBC One. Reviewing the opening episode of the second series, Kathryn Flett wrote in The Observer that it "really made (her) giggle".

== International versions ==
An American pilot was ordered by the Fox network in 2005, but Fox decided not to proceed with the show. CBS also commissioned a pilot of the series entitled Worst Week. Adapted by Matt Tarses, Worst Week premiered on 22 September 2008, on CBS and was canceled 20 May 2009.

In 2014, Pro TV adapted the series as "O sǎptǎmână nebună" (first season), "Altă săptămână nebună" (second season) and "Un Crăciun nebun" (Christmas special).

In late 2015, a Greek version aired on Mega Channel with the title "Η χειρότερη εβδομάδα της ζωής μου" ("The worst week of my life").

== Availability ==
Series one and two, as well as the Christmas special, are available on Region 2 DVD. The Worst Week of My Life: Complete BBC Collection was released on Region 2 DVD on 26 November 2007. The first series is also available on Region 1 DVD, and had a Region 4 release in February 2008. A two-episode French version was produced in 2011 by Frédéric Auburtin. Beginning in 2020 UK Digital Channel Forces TV began broadcasting repeats of the series.
