= Rachel Riley =

English television presenter (born 1986)

Rachel Riley MBE
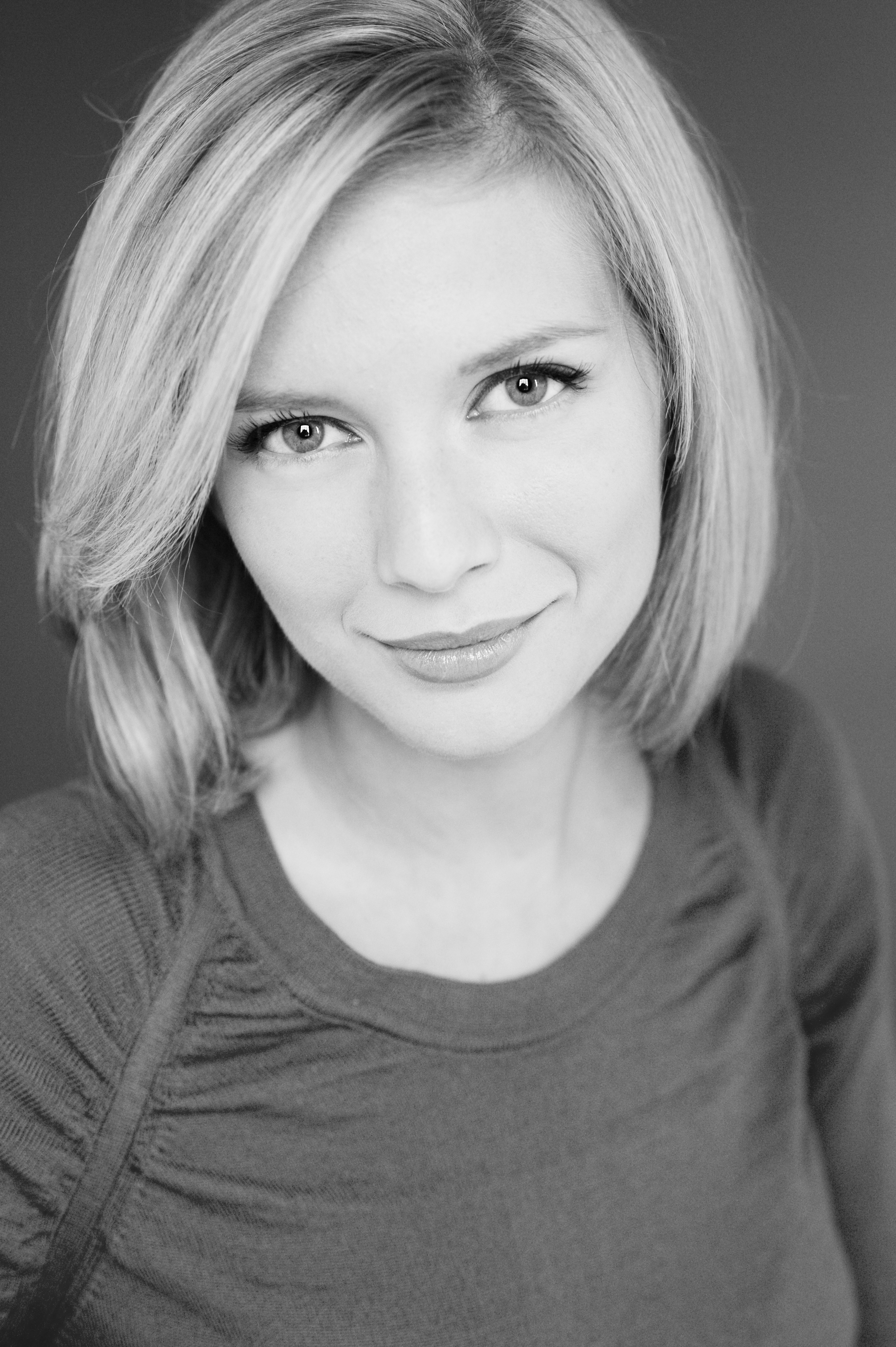
- Riley in 2011
- Born: Rachel Annabelle Riley; 11 January 1986 (age 40); Rochford, Essex, England
- Education: Oriel College, Oxford
- Occupation: Television presenter
- Years active: 2009–present
- Spouses: Jamie Gilbert (m. 2012; div. 2013) Pasha Kovalev (m. 2019)
- Children: 2

Rachel Annabelle Riley (born 11 January 1986) is an English television presenter. A mathematics graduate of Oriel College, Oxford, she joined the Channel 4 game show Countdown in January 2009 and also co-presents its comedy spin-off, 8 Out of 10 Cats Does Countdown.

Riley has co-presented The Gadget Show (2013–2014), It's Not Rocket Science (2016), and football programmes for Sky Sports. She competed in the eleventh series of Strictly Come Dancing in 2013. Her work promoting mathematics includes school visits and the book At Sixes and Sevens: How to Understand Numbers and Make Maths Easy (2021).

Riley is an anti-racism campaigner whose work includes Holocaust education and raising awareness of antisemitism. She was appointed a Member of the Order of the British Empire (MBE) in the 2023 New Year Honours for services to Holocaust education and antisemitism awareness. In 2025, she received the Freedom of the City of London for her work in these fields.

== Early life and education ==
Riley was born in Rochford, Essex, and grew up in Thorpe Bay, Southend-on-Sea. Her mother is Jewish, and Riley has described her maternal family's migration from Tsarist Russia during the pogroms.

She attended Thorpe Hall School and Southend High School for Girls. She achieved three A grades at A-level and an AS-level before studying mathematics at Oriel College, Oxford, where she graduated with a second-class degree.

While at university, Riley completed an internship at Deutsche Bank in the City of London. She subsequently decided against pursuing a career in finance.

== Television career ==
=== Countdown ===
Riley joined Countdown in January 2009, succeeding Carol Vorderman. Her appointment was announced alongside that of Jeff Stelling, who replaced Des O'Connor as the programme's main presenter. Riley's role involves displaying the letter and number selections and providing solutions to the numbers rounds.

Encouraged by her mother, Riley applied because of her interest in the programme's numbers rounds. She was selected from approximately 1,000 applicants despite having no previous television presenting experience.

From 2012, Riley also appeared in the same role on 8 Out of 10 Cats Does Countdown, the comedy spin-off hosted by Jimmy Carr.

=== Other presenting work ===
From 2013 to 2014, Riley co-presented The Gadget Show on Channel 5 with Jason Bradbury. She appeared in three series before being succeeded by Amy Williams.

In 2016, she co-presented the six-part ITV science entertainment series It's Not Rocket Science with Ben Miller and Romesh Ranganathan.

Later that year, Riley joined Sky Sports, presenting Friday Night Football with Stelling and Fantasy Football Club with Max Rushden and Paul Merson. She left Friday Night Football in 2017.

=== Strictly Come Dancing ===
In 2013, Riley competed in the eleventh series of Strictly Come Dancing, partnered with professional dancer Pasha Kovalev. They were eliminated in the sixth week following a dance-off against Abbey Clancy and Aljaž Škorjanec. Riley later described experiencing stage fright during the series and receiving cognitive behavioural therapy to help manage it.

== Mathematics and other work ==
Riley has visited schools to encourage interest in mathematics and science. She has also supported National Numeracy initiatives and encouraged girls to pursue science, technology, engineering and mathematics.

In October 2021, she published At Sixes and Sevens: How to Understand Numbers and Make Maths Easy.

Riley is a global ambassador and UK board member of Grassroot Soccer, a charity that uses football in adolescent health programmes.

In 2019, her promotion of Shell's energy initiatives drew criticism from environmental campaigners, who described the campaign as greenwashing.

In October 2026 Riley began hosting the new YouTube channel and podcast "The Maths of Everything".

== Campaigning and public activity ==
In 2018, Riley began publicly criticising the Labour Party's handling of antisemitism allegations under Jeremy Corbyn. She said that posters describing Israel as a racist endeavour had prompted her to speak out. The posters appeared during the dispute over Labour's adoption of the IHRA definition of antisemitism. The IHRA definition lists denying Jewish self-determination, including the claim that Israel's existence is a "racist endeavor", among its examples of antisemitism, to be assessed in their overall context. In September that year, she said she had no party allegiance.

In February 2019, The Times reported that she had attended discussions about establishing a centrist party separate from Labour. She also supported the Stop Funding Fake News campaign.

Riley was among the participants in a 2022 Center for Countering Digital Hate study of abusive Instagram messages sent to high-profile women. The organisation reported that Instagram had failed to act on 90% of the abusive messages it reported.

After the 2024 Bondi Junction stabbings, and before the facts of the incident emerged, Riley linked the attack to calls to "global intifada", stating: "If you want to know what 'globalise the intifada' looks like, see the Sydney mall", a post that, according to The Independent, was accused of "perpetuating Islamophobia". Riley deleted her post and said she was "sorry if this message was misunderstood", and stated that her comments were not meant to imply a link to Islamic extremism. (The perpetrator was later identified as Joel Cauchi, a 40-year-old mentally ill man from Toowoomba.) Channel 4 stated: "We have reminded Rachel of her obligations as a contributor to Channel 4 programming."

=== Legal proceedings ===
In February 2019, Riley and Tracy-Ann Oberman announced plans for legal action over social-media posts they regarded as defamatory or harassing. In July 2020, they withdrew a joint libel claim against a person who had shared a link to an article accusing them of harassing a teenage Labour supporter, and agreed to contribute to the defendant's legal costs.

In December 2021, Riley was awarded £10,000 in libel damages against Laura Murray, a former aide to Corbyn, over a tweet alleging that Riley had said Corbyn deserved to be violently attacked. The judge found in Riley's favour while also finding an element of provocation in her original post.

In November 2022, Riley was awarded £50,000 in libel damages against blogger Michael Sivier over an article alleging that she had supported and encouraged online abuse of a teenager. The High Court rejected his public-interest defence and ordered him to remove the article and not repeat the allegations.

== Personal life ==
Riley married Jamie Gilbert, whom she had met at Oxford, in August 2012. Their separation was announced in November 2013. She then began a relationship with Kovalev, her former Strictly Come Dancing partner, and they married in Las Vegas in June 2019.

The couple have two daughters, born in December 2019 and November 2021.

Riley is Jewish. She and Kovalev adopted a vegan diet in 2018.

She supports Manchester United. The club was her specialist subject on Celebrity Mastermind in 2012, when she finished joint second.

== Honours ==
Riley was appointed an MBE in the 2023 New Year Honours for services to Holocaust education and antisemitism awareness. In October 2025, she received the Freedom of the City of London in recognition of her Holocaust education and antisemitism campaigning work.

== Filmography ==
=== Television ===
Year	Title	Channel	Role	Notes
2009–present	Countdown	Channel 4	Co-presenter	With Jeff Stelling (2009–2011), Nick Hewer (2012–2021), Anne Robinson (2021–2022) and Colin Murray (2022–present)
2010	The IT Crowd	Channel 4	Herself	Cameo as herself on Countdown
2012–present	8 Out of 10 Cats Does Countdown	Channel 4	Co-presenter	With Jimmy Carr
2013–2014	The Gadget Show	Channel 5	Co-presenter	With Jason Bradbury
2013	Strictly Come Dancing	BBC One	Participant	5th celebrity to be eliminated
2014	Memory Slam	Watch	Presenter	
2016	It's Not Rocket Science	ITV	Co-presenter	With Ben Miller and Romesh Ranganathan
2016–2017	Friday Night Football	Sky Sports	Co-presenter	With Jeff Stelling
2016–2017	Fantasy Football Club	Sky Sports	Co-presenter	With Max Rushden and Paul Merson
2019	Celebrity Countdown	More4	Co-presenter	With Nick Hewer
2024	Beat the Chasers	ITV	Contestant	Won £20,000 for her chosen charity: The Angus Lawson Memorial Trust
2025	Shark! Celebrity Infested Waters	ITV1	Contestant	5-part reality show
2025	The Weakest Link	BBC One	Contestant, Winner	With Bonnie Langford
