= Epic Win =

- Genre: Comedy
- Created by: Andrew Brereton; Jamie Ormerod
- Written by: Gary Delaney; Henry Paker; Paul Powell; David Reilly
- Directed by: Jim Hickey; Gemma Rawcliffe; Richard Van't Riet; Barbara Lee
- Presented by: Alexander Armstrong
- Voices of: Joe Lycett
- Country of origin: United Kingdom
- Original language: English
- No. of series: 1
- No. of episodes: 6

Production
- Executive producer: Antonia Hurford-Jones
- Producers: Jim Hickey; Gemma Rawcliffe; Sarah Church; Gemma Nightingale; Lucie Rake; Richard Grocock
- Production location: BBC Television Centre
- Editors: Steve Charles; Crispin Holland; Dan Mellow; Nick Peto
- Running time: 35 minutes
- Production company: Unique

Original release
- Network: BBC One
- Release: 20 August – 24 September 2011

Epic Win is a British game show that aired on BBC One from 20 August to 24 September 2011 and was hosted by Alexander Armstrong.

== Format ==
In the programme, contestants complete individual challenges such as trying to dress whilst bouncing a football or cycling whilst trying to inflate hot water bottles. Those who complete their challenge win the Epic Win trophy and go to the "Epic Centre" to have the opportunity to win between £3 and £3,000, depending on what the celebrity panelists think this is worth. Those who fail a challenge have to exit through the "fail door".

When playing for the cash, the panel members each note down an amount between £1 and £1,000 depending on how impressed they are with somebody's skill. Successful contestants can then potentially win an amount up to the total that the panelists pledged. The contestant is then given a sequence of increasing amounts, with the option to stop at any time by pressing the red button. If the last amount announced before the button was pressed is equal to or lower than the panel's total, they win the cash (and Joe Lycett announces "EPIC WIN!"). If the contestant's total is higher than the panel's total, Joe Lycett announces "zero pounds" and they leave with nothing but the trophy and go through the fail door.

== Celebrity guests ==
No.	Celebrities	Original release date
1	Micky Flanagan, Jason Manford and Nina Wadia	20 August 2011
2	Micky Flanagan, Katy Brand and Rita Simons	27 August 2011
3	Micky Flanagan, Ed Byrne and Sunetra Sarker	3 September 2011
4	Micky Flanagan, Kevin Bridges and Alex Jones	10 September 2011
5	Patrick Kielty, Stephen K. Amos and Ann Widdecombe	17 September 2011
6	Micky Flanagan, Jason Byrne and Joe Swash	24 September 2011
