= Armstrong and Miller (radio show) =

British sketch comedy on BBC Radio 4

Armstrong and Miller was a short-lived radio programme that aired in March 1998. There were four 15-minute episodes and it was broadcast on BBC Radio 4. It starred Alexander Armstrong, Ben Miller, Samuel West and Tony Gardner.
