= I Could Never Be Your Woman =

2007 film by Amy Heckerling

- Theatrical release poster
- Directed by: Amy Heckerling
- Written by: Amy Heckerling
- Produced by: Cerise Hallam Larkin; Philippe Martinez; Alan Latham
- Starring: Michelle Pfeiffer; Paul Rudd; Sarah Alexander; Stacey L. Dash; Jon Lovitz; Fred Willard; Saoirse Ronan; Tracey Ullman
- Cinematography: Brian Tufano
- Edited by: Kate Coggins
- Music by: Mike Hedges
- Production companies: Templar Films; Bauer Martinez Entertainment; Formula Films; Lucky 7 Productions
- Distributed by: The Weinstein Company
- Release dates: May 11, 2007 (Spain); February 12, 2008 (United States)
- Running time: 97 minutes
- Country: United States
- Language: English
- Budget: $24 million
- Box office: $9.6 million

I Could Never Be Your Woman is a 2007 American romantic comedy film written and directed by Amy Heckerling and starring Michelle Pfeiffer and Paul Rudd, with Sarah Alexander, Stacey L. Dash, Jon Lovitz, Fred Willard, Saoirse Ronan, and Tracey Ullman. The film's title is a line from the 1997 song "Your Woman" by British artist White Town. It was released theatrically in several international markets beginning in Spain on May 11, 2007, while in the United States, it was released direct-to-DVD on February 12, 2008, receiving mixed to positive critic reviews.

== Plot ==
Forty-five-year-old divorced mother Rosie is a writer and producer for the television sitcom You Go Girl. Insecure about her age, she uses cosmetics to maintain her appearance. She has a close relationship with her thirteen-year-old daughter, Izzie, who confides in Rosie about her crush on Dylan, a boy in her class.

Despite her ex-husband's urging that she start dating again, Rosie is single. Due to the show's declining ratings, Rosie's boss Marty tells the writers to avoid any potentially controversial subjects. In an effort to revamp the show, Rosie decides to cast a new character. Taken with Adam, a bright and charming young man from one of her auditions, she casts him as a new, nerdy character to serve as a love interest for the arrogant and self-centered lead character, played by actress Brianna. Adam's character tests well, so Rosie persuades Marty to give him a chance.

Rosie continues to offer Izzie advice on Dylan, as she becomes smitten with Adam, who suggests they go clubbing. When he picks her up, he immediately bonds with Izzie through a video game she is playing to impress Dylan. While out, Rosie lies that she is 37, while Adam says he is 32. She is nervous about their age difference, but when he goes onto the dancefloor at the nightclub, she realizes they are equally free-spirited, and joins him. Kissing in Adam's car, Rosie admits she is actually 40, and is startled when Adam confesses he is actually 29.

Adam assures Rosie that he does not care about their age difference, and they continue their relationship. Nevertheless, Rosie's insecurity over her age surfaces, egged on by her internal conversations with Mother Nature, and she tells Adam she is not sure that their relationship will work, to his confusion.

Meanwhile, their relationship arouses the jealousy of Rosie's secretary, Jeannie. She sabotages them by stealing Adam's gifts to Rosie, as well as his phone, putting a sexy photograph of Brianna on it before dropping it in Rosie's handbag. Rosie continues to be nervous when she hears a recording of Adam flirting with Brianna (he was told to do so in order to make her the center of attention). Things become worse when Izzie has a failed double date with Dylan and becomes insecure about her appearance, something that concerns Rosie.

When Adam first appears on the show, he is an instant hit and becomes famous. This leads to Rosie becoming even more insecure and worrying he will take advantage of his fame and start looking at younger women. To make matters worse, You Go Girl is unexpectedly canceled. Shortly afterward, Adam is given a role in an upcoming sitcom, and Rosie is shocked to discover a speeding ticket sent to Adam showing him in a car with Brianna. Already in a foul mood, Rosie berates Izzie after a chance encounter with her friend, Henry Winkler, who reveals that Izzie and her friend had prank-called him and a number of other celebrities in her phone book.

Rosie confronts Adam with the photograph of him and Brianna, and even though he insists he has never been in a car with her before, she angrily breaks up with him. Despite this, Adam makes numerous attempts to reconcile, including refusing to film the new sitcom he has been offered until Marty hires her as a producer. Marty calls to offer Rosie a job as supervising producer on Adam's sitcom, but she declines. Later, while viewing a bloopers reel of You Go Girl, Rosie realizes it was filmed when the speeding ticket claimed Adam had been driving with Brianna, and correctly deduces that Jeannie was behind it.

Rosie accepts Marty's offer to work on Adam's sitcom, on the condition that Marty fires Jeannie, which he does. She then reconciles with Adam. Later, at a school talent show, she sees Izzie has finally won Dylan over and watches as they kiss. Mother Nature reminds Rosie that, in growing older, she is making way for a girl like Izzie to replace her.

== Cast ==
- Michelle Pfeiffer as Rosie Hanson
- Paul Rudd as Adam Pearl
- Sarah Alexander as Jeannie
- Stacey L. Dash as Brianna Minx
- Jon Lovitz as Nathan Mensforth
- Fred Willard as Marty Watkin
- Saoirse Ronan as Izzie Mensforth
- Tracey Ullman as Mother Nature
- Yasmin Paige as Melanie
- Rory Copus as Dylan
- O-T Fagbenle as Sean
- Twink Caplan as Sissy
- Henry Winkler as himself (uncredited)

Several British comedy actors have roles in the film, including Phil Cornwell, Olivia Colman, David Mitchell, Steve Pemberton, and Mackenzie Crook, as well as Irish comedy actors Graham Norton and Ed Byrne.

== Production ==
Heckerling's inspiration for I Could Never Be Your Woman came from her own personal life as a single mother raising a young daughter during the making of the Clueless television series. According to Missy Schwartz in an Entertainment Weekly article on the film, "Every day, she felt increasingly ambivalent about working in an industry that promotes unrealistic standards of beauty for young girls and considers women over 40 to be prehistoric beasts."

Heckerling sent her script for Woman to Paramount Pictures, but the studio was unnerved by the idea of backing a film about an older female protagonist. The script was eventually read by independent producer Philippe Martinez of Bauer Martinez Entertainment, and he picked up the film with a $25 million budget.

Principal photography began in August 2005 and ended later in the year. Although many scenes were shot in California, several scenes were shot in London to take advantage of tax incentives. To cut production costs even further, Martinez suggested to Michelle Pfeiffer to take a reduced salary ($1 million, plus 15% of the gross).

== Release ==
Martinez signed a deal with Metro-Goldwyn-Mayer (MGM) to distribute the film theatrically, and The Weinstein Company for DVD and non-pay TV distribution rights. MGM backed out upon learning about Pfeiffer's share in the film's revenue. After Martinez failed to find a theatrical distributor, the film was given a direct-to-DVD release in North America on February 12, 2008.

Internationally, I Could Never Be Your Woman received a theatrical release beginning in Spain on May 11, 2007, followed by several countries in Europe, Latin America, Asia, and Africa.

== Reception ==
On the review aggregator website Rotten Tomatoes, I Could Never Be Your Woman holds an approval rating of 67% based on 12 reviews, with an average rating of 6/10.

James Berardinelli of ReelViews gave the film three out of four stars, calling it "an enjoyable romantic comedy that has enough going for it to make it worth a recommendation" and adding that "Michelle Pfeiffer and Paul Rudd have adequate chemistry to pull off the romance." Joe Leydon of Variety described the film as "a desperately unfunny mix of tepid showbiz satire and formulaic romantic comedy".
