= Lucius Thompson-McCausland =

British economist (1904–1984)

Lucius Perronet Thompson-McCausland (12 December 1904 – 16 February 1984) was a British economist who took part in the Bretton Woods Conference and was a Treasury advisor during the sterling crisis in the 1960s.

Thompson was the son of Sir John Thompson and his wife Ada Tyrrell. His father was Chief Commissioner of Delhi between 1928 and 1932. He was educated at Repton School and was a scholar at King's College, Cambridge. He joined Herbert Wagg & Co in 1928 and the Financial News, and Moody's Economist service in 1929. He left the Financial News in 1934 and in 1939 left Moody's and joined the Bank of England as a temporary clerk and was assistant adviser from 1941 to 1949. He assumed the surname Thompson-McCausland by Royal Licence on 16 April 1942, in accordance with family settlement.

== Career ==
Thompson-McCausland had important roles at the Bank of England and accompanied John Maynard Keynes to the Bretton Woods conference in 1944 and, after Keynes' death in 1946, to the Havana Conference in 1948. He was advisor to the Governor of the Bank of England from 1949 until 1965. He became a governor of Repton School in 1953 and was chairman of the Governors from 1959 to 1970. From 1964 to 1969 he was chairman of the Corporation of Working Men's Colleges. In 1965 he left the Bank of England and became a Director of Dun and Bradstreet until 1975. He lived at Epcombs, Hertingfordbury, Hertfordshire, and was High Sheriff of Hertfordshire from 1965 to 1966. From 1965 to 1968, he was a consultant to the Treasury on the international monetary problems. In 1967 he became a Director of Tricentrol Ltd, becoming chairman in 1970. He also re-joined Moody's in 1970. From 1969 to 1980 he was principal of the Corporation of Working Men's College. In 1975 he left Dun and Bradstreet and Moody's, and in 1976 he left Tricentrol. He described his recreations as gardening and travel. He died on 16 February 1984.

== Personal life ==
Thompson married Helen Laura McCausland on 30 April 1930 and they had six children:

- Marcus (b. 1931)
- Marianne (b. 1932)
- Dominick (1936–1936, died in infancy)
- Benedict (b. 1938)
- Eileen (b. 1939)
- Emma (b. 1942)

Marcus became a clergyman. Benedict rowed in the 1959 Boat Race for Cambridge and became a banker. Emma married Dr. Henry Armstrong and they are the parents of actor and comedian Alexander Armstrong.
