= A Year of Songs =

Studio album by Alexander Armstrong
- Released: 6 November 2015
- Genre: Classical; operatic pop
- Length: 47:21
- Label: Rhino; East West
- Producer: Simon Franglen

Alexander Armstrong chronology
A Year of Songs (2015)	Upon a Different Shore (2016)

A Year of Songs is the debut studio album by English comedian and actor Alexander Armstrong. The album was released on 6 November 2015 by Rhino and East West. It debuted at six on the UK Albums Chart, and at one on the Official Classical Artist Albums Chart.

As of November 2016, the album has sold 187,671 copies in the UK.

== Track listing ==
No.	Title	Writer(s)	Producer(s)	Length
1.	"On Days Like These"	Quincy Jones; Don Black	Simon Franglen	3:41
2.	"Stranger in Paradise"	Robert Wright; George Forrest	Franglen	4:07
3.	"A Nightingale Sang in Berkeley Square"	Eric Maschwitz; Manning Sherwin	Franglen	4:00
4.	"Hushabye Mountain"	Richard M. Sherman; Robert B. Sherman	Franglen	3:27
5.	"Summertime"	George Gershwin; DuBose Heyward	Franglen	3:06
6.	"The Water Is Wide (O Waly Waly)"	Traditional	Franglen	4:35
7.	"Londonderry Air (Danny Boy)"	Frederic Weatherly	Franglen	4:38
8.	"Down by the Salley Gardens"	William Butler Yeats	Franglen	4:10
9.	"Over the Hills"	Traditional	Franglen	4:34
10.	"Ca' the yowes"	Traditional	Franglen	3:43
11.	"Bleak Midwinter"	Christina Rossetti	Franglen	3:33
12.	"Rothbury Hills"	Traditional	Franglen	3:47

== Charts ==
=== Weekly charts ===
Chart (2015)	Peak position
UK Albums (OCC)	6
UK Classical Artist Albums (OCC)	1

=== Year-end charts ===
Chart (2015)	Position
UK Albums (OCC)	32
