= Marley's Ghosts =

- Genre: Sitcom
- Starring: Sarah Alexander; Jo Joyner; Nicholas Burns; John Hannah; Mina Anwar (series 1)
- Country of origin: United Kingdom
- Original language: English
- No. of series: 2
- No. of episodes: 9

Production
- Running time: 30 minutes

Original release
- Network: Gold (United Kingdom)
- Release: 30 September 2015 – 23 November 2016

Marley's Ghosts is a British television sitcom which premiered on 30 September 2015 on Gold. The series revolves around magistrate Marley Wise (Sarah Alexander) who is able to see and talk with a trio of ghosts comprising her husband (John Hannah), her lover (Nicholas Burns), and the local vicar (Jo Joyner).

The second series aired on Gold in October and November 2016.

== Cast and characters ==
- Sarah Alexander as Marley Wise
- Jo Joyner as Vicar
- Nicholas Burns as Michael Walton, Marley's lover
- John Hannah as Adam Wise, Marley's husband
- Mina Anwar as Tina Jarvis (Series 1)

== Episodes ==
=== Series 1 (2015) ===
No. overall	No. in series	Title	Directed by	Written by	Original release date
1	1	"Episode One"	Ben Gosling Fuller	Daniel Peacock	30 September 2015
Forty-something magistrate Marley finds that her complicated life with an alcoholic husband and a workplace lover becomes even more complicated when her husband chokes to death on a chicken bone. Soon after, her lover is killed in a car accident, and the vicar who is driving the car dies of her injuries in hospital. She is puzzled and disturbed that she can see all their ghosts, and that they all move into her house, where only Marley can see or interact with them.
2	2	"Episode Two"	Ben Gosling Fuller	Daniel Peacock	7 October 2015
3	3	"Episode Three"	Ben Gosling Fuller	Daniel Peacock	14 October 2015

=== Series 2 (2016) ===
No. overall	No. in series	Title	Directed by	Written by	Original release date
4	1	"Dead Man's Chest"	Jonathan Gershfield	Daniel Peacock	19 October 2016
5	2	"Fit"	Jonathan Gershfield	Daniel Peacock	26 October 2016
6	3	"Blind Sided"	Jonathan Gershfield	Daniel Peacock	2 November 2016
7	4	"The Art Teacher"	Jonathan Gershfield	Daniel Peacock	9 November 2016
8	5	"Carly"	Jonathan Gershfield	Daniel Peacock	16 November 2016
9	6	"Christmas"	Jonathan Gershfield	Daniel Peacock	23 November 2016
