= Huge (film) =

- Film poster
- Directed by: Ben Miller
- Screenplay by: Ben Miller; Simon Godley
- Based on: Huge by: Jez Butterworth; Ben Miller; Simon Godley
- Starring: Noel Clarke; Johnny Harris; Ralph Brown; Thandiwe Newton; Tamsin Egerton; Russell Tovey
- Cinematography: Trevor Forrest
- Music by: Christian Henson
- Release date: 18 June 2010 (Edinburgh International Film Festival)
- Running time: 78 minutes
- Country: United Kingdom
- Language: English

Huge is a 2010 British comedy film. It is Ben Miller's debut as a director and an adaptation of a stage play written by Miller, Jez Butterworth and Simon Godley.

== Production ==
The play Huge was a hit at Edinburgh Festival Fringe and it took Miller fifteen years to get the film adaptation made. While the play was co-written with Jez Butterworth and Simon Godley, Butterworth was committed to working on Fair Game and was unable to take part in writing the film adaptation.

Thandiwe Newton's role was written for her but she had reservations so Miller worked with script editor Jay Basu to rewrite and incorporate Newton's suggestions.

== Cast ==
- Noel Clarke - Clark
- Johnny Harris - Warren Duggan
- Ralph Brown - Neil
- Thandiwe Newton - Kris
- Tamsin Egerton - Clarisse
- Russell Tovey - Carl

== Reception ==
The film was poorly received with a 14% rating at Rotten Tomatoes. Time Out gave the film one star and called the film "half-formed." The Guardian agreed calling the film "quite a finished product" but called it "an affectionate and promising debut" for filmmaker Miller. Empire gave the film two stars and called it "fatally unfunny."
