= Don't Ask Me Ask Britain =

2017 British comedy panel game show

- Genre: Comedy panel game
- Presented by: Alexander Armstrong
- Starring: Frank Skinner; Jonathan Ross
- Country of origin: United Kingdom
- Original language: English
- No. of series: 1
- No. of episodes: 6

Production
- Running time: 60 minutes (including adverts)
- Production company: Chalkboard TV

Original release
- Network: ITV
- Release: 18 April – 23 May 2017

Don't Ask Me Ask Britain was a British television comedy panel game show that aired on ITV from 18 April until 23 May 2017 and was hosted by Alexander Armstrong with Frank Skinner and Jonathan Ross as the team captains. The series was produced by Chalkboard TV for ITV. The goal is for the two teams to second-guess what the viewers will vote for in various questions by using an app and voting along live.

== Format ==
An app is available for iOS and Android devices where the viewers can vote along live to various questions. Skinner and Ross' teams must guess what will get the most votes. They'll get the points based on the percentage of people that went with their answer (for example, if an answer was voted by 30% of people, the team would get 30 points). There is also a round where Skinner and Ross must convince the viewers to agree with what they are arguing. They get the number of points based on what percentage agreed with them. The winner is the team with the most votes at the end of the show.

For the first three episodes, they would also go live to a family or a group of friends at their house to ask their opinion on the question. This however was scrapped from the fourth episode onwards.

== Episodes ==
The coloured backgrounds denote the result of each of the shows:

– Indicates Frank's team won.
– Indicates Jonathan's team won.

No.	Frank's guest	Jonathan's guest	Scores	Original release date
1	Jamelia	Deborah Meaden	203–190	18 April 2017
2	Nina Wadia	Sheila Hancock	217–179	25 April 2017
3	Caroline Quentin	Meera Syal	130–220	2 May 2017
4	Gabby Logan	Lolly Adefope	217–247	9 May 2017
5	Holly Walsh	Andi Oliver	217–313	16 May 2017
6	Adil Ray	Angela Barnes	270–239	23 May 2017

== International versions ==
The TV format, was exported in Italy on 2015 with the title Gli italiani hanno sempre ragione (The italians are always right), aired on Rai 1 in July, and hosted by Fabrizio Frizzi.

== Cancellation ==
On 24 November 2017, ITV cancelled the show, meaning that it would not return for a second series.
