= Upon a Different Shore =

Studio album by Alexander Armstrong
- Released: 28 October 2016
- Genre: Classical; operatic pop; classical crossover
- Length: 47:21
- Label: Rhino; East West
- Producer: Simon Franglen

Alexander Armstrong chronology
A Year of Songs (2015)	Upon a Different Shore (2016)	In a Winter Light (2017)

Upon a Different Shore is the second studio album by the English comedian and actor Alexander Armstrong. The album was released on 28 October 2016 by Rhino and East West. Unlike Armstrong's debut album A Year of Songs (2015), Upon a Different Shore sees him cover some songs that aren't pop standards, including "Firestone" by Kygo. It debuted at number 8 on the UK Albums Chart.

== Track listing ==
Standard edition
No.	Title	Length
1.	"Upon a Different Shore"	0:58
2.	"MacArthur Park"	7:01
3.	"The Vagabond"	3:00
4.	"Long Ago Forgotten"	0:38
5.	"Fields of Gold"	3:41
6.	"Studies in English Folksong #2"	1:24
7.	"Scarborough Fair / Canticle"	3:02
8.	"Golden Brown"	2:47
9.	"Firestone"	3:49
10.	"Sunday"	3:30
11.	"Between the Sunset and the Sea"	1:54
12.	"Without a Song"	3:11
13.	"The Day Thou Gavest"	0:39
14.	"Hymn Song"	3:27
15.	"High Hopes"	7:43
16.	"The Parting Glass (Armstrong's Goodnight)"	3:41
Total length:		50:34

== Studio personnel ==
- Recorded at Air Studios, North Seven Studios, Henry Licht Studio, Norbury Brook Studio
- Recorded by Peter Cobbin, Peter Hutchings, John Reynolds, Marcus Cliffe
- Engineering assistants: Fiona Cruickshank, John Prestage, Rhys Nord
- Pro Tools Programming: Andy Bradfield
- Mixed at Studio A London
- Mixed by Andy Bradfield

== Charts ==
=== Weekly charts ===
Chart (2016)	Peak position
Scottish Albums (OCC)	11
UK Albums (OCC)	8

=== Year-end charts ===
Chart (2016)	Position
UK Albums (OCC)	35
