= The Armstrong & Miller Show =

British TV sketch comedy on BBC One

- Series 1–2 title card
- Directed by: Dominic Brigstocke (series 1–2); Ben Kellett (series 3)
- Starring: Alexander Armstrong; Ben Miller; David Armand; Karen Hayley; Jim Howick; Katherine Jakeways; Lucy Montgomery; Tyger Drew-Honey; Dan Renton Skinner; Martha Howe-Douglas; Jessica Ransom
- Country of origin: United Kingdom
- Original language: English
- No. of series: 3
- No. of episodes: 19

Production
- Running time: 30 minutes
- Production company: Hat Trick Productions

Original release
- Network: BBC One
- Release: 26 October 2007 – 11 December 2010

Related
- Armstrong and Miller

The Armstrong & Miller Show is a British sketch comedy television show produced by Hat Trick Productions for BBC One. It features the double act Armstrong and Miller and a number of notable scriptwriters, including Andy Hamilton (co-creator of Outnumbered), and Jeremy Dyson (co-creator of The League of Gentlemen). It ran for three series between 2007 and 2010 and was nominated for two BAFTAs, winning one.

The series followed on from Armstrong and Miller on the Paramount Comedy Channel and Channel 4 between 1997 and 2001.

== Production ==
Three series of The Armstrong & Miller Show were produced by Hat Trick Productions for BBC One between 2007 and 2010. It marked the return of the comedy duo to TV since their previous sketch show Armstrong and Miller ended in 2001.

A fourth series was hinted at by Ben Miller in 2012, but there has been no mention of it since then.

== Recurring characters and jokes ==
- Two World War II RAF pilots who speak in upper-class accents but have the language and attitudes of stereotypical modern day teenagers, using colloquialisms such as "blud" and peppering their speech with "like", "innit" and "and shit".
- Brabbins and Fyffe, a pair of Flanders and Swann–like musicians who sing bawdy songs, sometimes hastily censored by the BBC.
- An insensitive but caring father (played by Armstrong) with the inability to sugar-coat difficult issues for his son (played by Tyger Drew-Honey).
- Roger (played by Miller) who continually returns home early and catches his wife and best friend Pete having an affair, but accepts their increasingly ludicrous explanations.
- Several Neanderthals who negotiate their way anachronistically through modern social difficulties such as job interviews, dinner parties and baby naming.
- Vox pops in which characters describe their quirks and mental illnesses and end with "so that's why I became a teacher", revealing them to be recruitment adverts.
- A plain-speaking satellite navigation system that advises a driver to avoid certain roads for non-traffic, often 'right-wing' tabloid related reasons, with a copy of Daily Mail always seen on the car dashboard.
- Dennis Lincoln-Park, a TV historian (played by Miller) who accidentally destroys priceless historical treasures.
- A man who tends to reveal too much information about his strange and disturbing hobbies while in polite company, following them up with "Was that a bit too weird?".
- A dentist who recounts sordid tales of tasteless encounters to which his patient, whose mouth is full of dental equipment, is unable to object.
- Parodies of public information films, voiced by Armstrong, whereby the obvious danger (a child standing on a stool and using a chip pan) is ignored in favour of a trivial change (using a chair instead of a stool).
- Various characters (played by Armstrong), including a children's TV presenter with two puppet sidekicks, a benevolent headmaster or a marriage counsellor, engaged in comforting or encouraging conversation with others. After his companions have left the room, Armstrong's character says the words "Kill them" into a hidden intercom in a distinctly "evil" tone of voice. After the credits of the final episode of series one this character is played by the producer with the order directed at Armstrong and Miller themselves.
- A Geordie window cleaner who gives a philosophical monologue consisting of ideas for solving various major crises facing the world, such as climate change or terrorism, before finishing with "but what do I know?"
- Jim (played by Miller), on honeymoon in Hawaii alone after his wife left him for the DJ on their wedding day, during which he trespasses on the honeymoon of another couple (Armstrong and Jakeways).
- Striding Man, a businessman (played by Armstrong), who is pursued by a team of researchers providing him with apparently useless and random information. He is fired in the final episode of series 2, but returns in series 3 as a secondary school headmaster.
- A guy who regularly wanders into expensive-looking shops to browse, only to be told by the salesman on hand to "fuck off" if he's not buying anything.
- An MI6 agent (played by Miller) is trying to do serious work, but his over-caring boss (played by Armstrong) makes light of these situations and forces the agent to partake in fun, children's activities.
- A PE teacher and ex-spy (Miller) who is persuaded to go undercover again, despite insisting that his under 12 boys Rugby team tag along.
- Various suave male characters whose intentions are dashed when the other characters in the sketch notice their hairstyle, with the words "Ugh. Ponytail!", and start dry vomiting.
- Miranda (played by Armstrong) and Pru (played by Miller) who attempt to run the Dandylions vegetarian restaurant, politely trying not to argue in front of the customers, until a customer's comment highlights their difficulties. A brawl is instigated by the proprietors with the words "Pru, it's kicking off!", perpetually ending with the same unfortunate customer, (Jim Howick), being thrown through a window.
- A selection of Regency-era suitors and spinsters whose mid-dance conversational advances are unexpectedly explicit.
- The British Prime Minister (played by Miller), who invariably leaves something vitally important behind after a successful meeting (such as his wife, or nuclear launch codes), but is too embarrassed to return and collect it.
- Doctor Tia (played by Armstrong), who "lives in Botswana, saving lives. Do you?". He addresses the camera about his insights into local culture, and the fruits of his work, only for the camera to reveal that he is secretly despised by the people he is trying to help.
- Various characters experiencing extraordinary success, only to reveal to the camera: "I'm wearing my wife's knickers."
- Three children's TV presenters who are publicly humiliated for their inappropriate behaviour, and have to apologise and explain their actions to their audience in child-friendly language. The descriptions in the official YouTube channel suggests that these characters are a parody of Blue Peter. The sketch performed for Red Nose Day 2011 explicitly referred to Blue Peter, as does the DVD release(episode 1 of series 2 only). It appears these sketches are based loosely on the sacking of presenter Richard Bacon and subsequent on-air explanation offered to its child audience.
- A parody of Jeeves and Wooster, with Mr Stafford (played by Armstrong) and his butler Veal (played by Miller). Stafford is a bigot who acts with criminal disregard for others, and then asks for Veal's help sorting out the mess. Veal is horrified.
- Tony Dorset, an old-school football manager and former player who is employed by Russian oligarch boss Dimitri. Tony lives in fear of Dimitri's fond spot for him, and his boss's Mafioso tendencies, and is never quite sure how to play the situation.
- Two out-of-touch Dracula-like vampires trying to get virgin blood as though they're 'on the pull', yet often beaten by more modern Twilight vampires.
- A series of dramatic or odd situations in which the climax is spoilt by someone remembering that they forget to put the bins out.
- An accident happening to Armstrong, then Miller coming on screen as himself, saying "Um, this isn't funny, but it actually happened to a friend of mine, so..." He then makes slight gestures toward the viewers, such as shrugging his shoulders and raising his eyebrows.
- Simpkins (Miller), a recent expatriate to France, who has forgotten his mother tongue. He eventually asks someone for twenty euros.
- Wild Cooking with Flint and Rory, a show about a pair of Geordie campers who say that they are going to cook something from the wild, but opt out for an easier, modern alternative due to small 'problems' with the thing they were going to cook.
- Couples being interviewed, which at the end of each one, reveals a fact that would end or cause difficulties in normal relationships.
- A seemingly ordinary man (played by Miller) who, while viewing items like a house or a car for sale, suddenly acts out various inappropriate scenarios, imagining he is (often arguing) with his wife, Sandra, and children, Jessica and Oliver.
- A serious and sometimes dramatic scene involving Armstrong and two women. At the end, Armstrong says, "Any chance of a threesome?" He then says, "No, ok," and agrees with whatever they were giving him in the scene.
- Two middle-aged, northern women (played by the leads) who own an Ann Summers style sexy lingerie store and rather than being discreet make cheeky comments about customers purchases (series 3 only).
- Terry Devlin, a Royal reporter who is always armed with a glass of wine but with little factual information about his subject. This doesn't stop him from sharing his lengthy 'expert' opinion on the happenings in the Royal household. He is often introduced by the news anchor after some unseen 'harrowing' report on a very serious tragedy, highlighting the often inane nature of royal 'news' in general.
- One notable sketch in series 1 had Armstrong playing a fictionalised version of himself appearing on the genealogy documentary series Who Do You Think You Are? in which he learns of the embarrassing backgrounds of his grandparents. Armstrong would appear on the actual programme in 2010, where it is discovered that he is a descendant of William the Conqueror.

== Chronology ==
Series	Episodes	First aired
1	7	26 October – 14 December 2007
2	6	16 October – 27 November 2009
3	6	30 October – 11 December 2010

A special compilation episode featuring clips from all three series was aired on 26 March 2011.

== Awards ==
Visitors to British Comedy Guide voted The Armstrong and Miller Show the "Best Sketch Show of 2007".

It received a nomination in the 2007 BAFTAs for Best Comedy Series before winning the actual award for the year 2009.

== DVD releases ==
All three series have been released on region 2 DVDs in single- and multiple-disc sets.

The first series was released on 24 November 2008. The second series was released on 23 November 2009. The third series was released on 6 December 2010.

Sets containing the first two and all three series were made available on 23 November 2009 and 6 December 2010, respectively.

== Book ==
The Armstrong and Miller book was released in 2010.
