= Ben Miller =

English comedian and actor (born 1966)

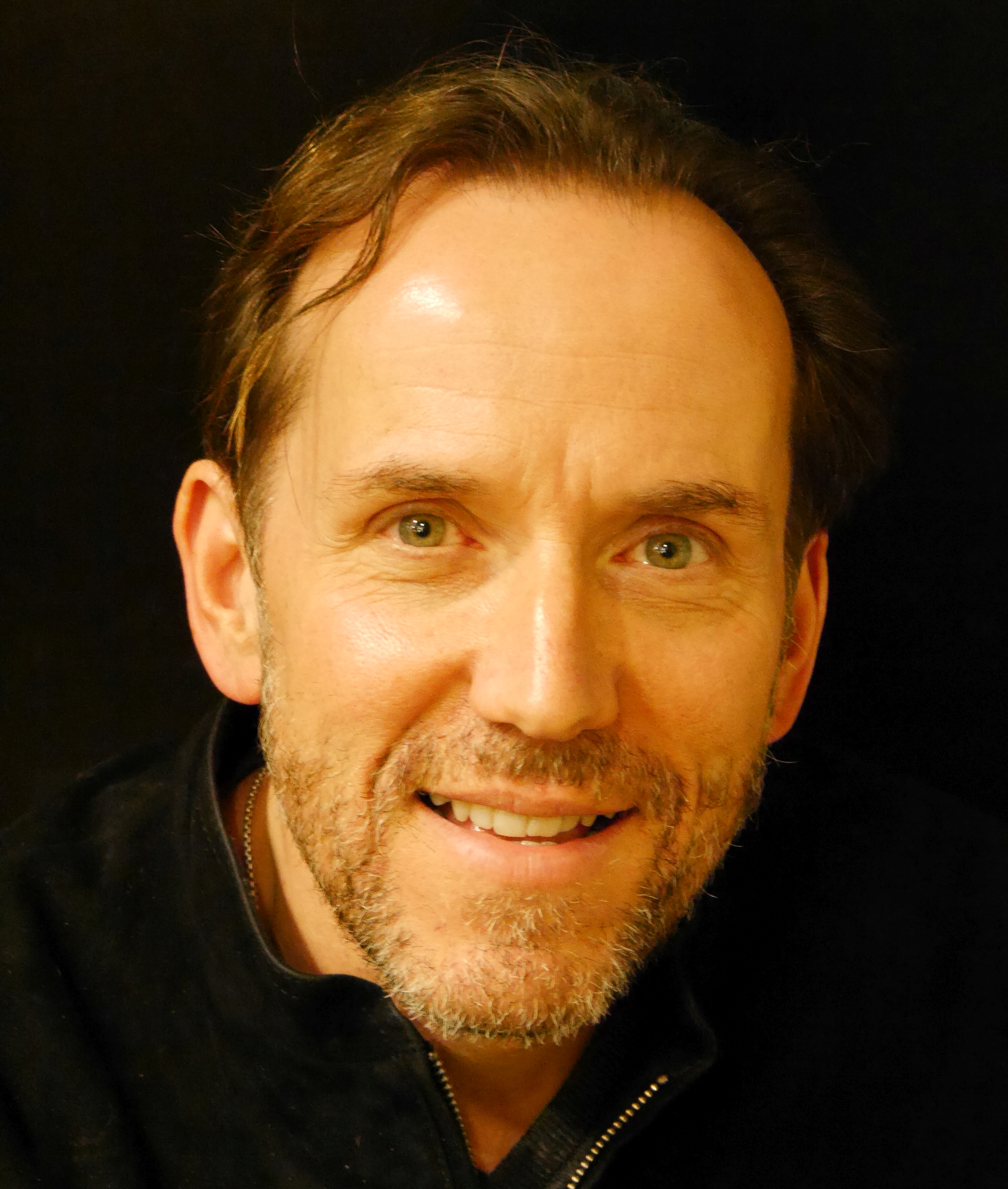
- Miller in 2019
- Born: Bennet Evan Miller; 24 February 1966 (age 60); London, England
- Education: St Catharine's College, Cambridge
- Occupations: Comedian; actor; author
- Years active: 1986–present
- Spouses: Belinda Stewart-Wilson (m. 2004; div. 2011) Jessica Parker (m. 2013)
- Children: 3
- Relatives: Alan Parker (father-in-law)

Bennet Evan Miller (born 24 February 1966) is an English comedian, actor, and author. He rose to fame as a member of the comedy duo Armstrong and Miller, with fellow comedian Alexander Armstrong. His credits include Armstrong and Miller (1997-2001), The Parole Officer (2001), Johnny English (2003), The Prince and Me (2004), The Worst Week of My Life (2005), Saxondale (2006), Primeval (2007-2011), Razzle Dazzle: A Journey into Dance (2007), Huge (2010), Death in Paradise (2011–2014), Molly Moon and the Incredible Book of Hypnotism (2012), What We Did on Our Holiday (2014), Horrible Histories (2015), It's Not Rocket Science (2015), Doctor Who - "episode: Robot of Sherwood" (2016), I Want My Wife Back (2016), Ballot Monkeys (2016), Johnny English Strikes Again (2018), Upstart Crow (2018), Sticks and Stones (2019), Bridgerton (2020), Professor T. (2021–2026), and Austin (2024).

== Early life and education ==
Bennet Evan Miller's parents were teachers. His father taught American literature at the City of Birmingham Polytechnic. His mother was from Neath, Wales. His paternal grandfather was a tailor in the East End of London, while his paternal great-grandmother taught English at South Cheshire College. He has two younger sisters. He is a distant cousin of Abraham Lincoln.

Miller was educated at Malbank School and Sixth Form College in Nantwich before studying Natural Sciences at St Catharine's College, Cambridge. As an undergraduate, he participated in theatre with his girlfriend, actress Rachel Weisz. He remained at Cambridge to undertake a PhD in solid state physics, with the title of his proposed thesis being "Novel quantum effects in low-temperature quasi-zero-dimensional mesoscopic electron systems".

He abandoned his thesis to pursue a career in comedy. His interest in comedy began when a friend asked him to help chauffeur the judges of the National Student Drama Festival, which was being held that year in Cambridge. Having finished his degree, he joined the Footlights in 1989 and worked with Andy Parsons, David Wolstencroft and Sue Perkins before he directed a revue.

== Career ==
Miller moved to London to pursue a career in comedy. He was introduced to fellow Cambridge graduate Alexander Armstrong in 1992, at the TBA Sketch Comedy Group, a comedy club which ran at the Gate Theatre Studio, Notting Hill throughout the 1990s. They performed their first full-length show together at the Edinburgh Fringe in 1994, and returned when they were nominated for the Perrier Comedy Award 1996.

Their success resulted in the commission of the television series Armstrong and Miller, which ran for four series from 1997 to 2001 – one on the Paramount Comedy Channel and three on Channel 4. In 1998, the duo also had their own radio show with the same name on BBC Radio 4, which featured many of the sketches and characters from their TV series. After a six-year break, the show was recommissioned for Hat Trick Productions as The Armstrong & Miller Show and three series have been produced. In 2008, they also had a second radio show, Children's Hour with Armstrong and Miller.

Miller also started acting in films, starring in Steve Coogan's first feature film, The Parole Officer (2001). In 2003 he played the role of Bough, sidekick to Rowan Atkinson's title character, in the film Johnny English. In 2004 he co-starred in the romantic comedy The Prince and Me.

In 2004 and 2005, he starred alongside Sarah Alexander in two series of the BBC television series The Worst Week of My Life. In 2006 he took part in a three-part Christmas special, The Worst Christmas of My Life. He starred as James Peregrine Lester in ITV's sci-fi drama Primeval (2007), and as children's dance instructor Mr Jonathan in the Australian mockumentary film Razzle Dazzle: A Journey into Dance.

He and Alexander Armstrong formed a production company named Toff Media in 2007. The company was dissolved in 2023.

Miller provided the voice for the ITV Digital and later PG Tips Monkey in a popular series of television advertisements featuring Johnny Vegas. In 2008, he appeared as television producer Jonathan Pope in Tony Jordan's series Moving Wallpaper on ITV1 and starred in Thank God You're Here.

In 2009, Miller appeared with Rob Brydon in an episode of QI (Series 6. 9). The two have often been mistaken for each other, and as a joke they dressed in similar shirts for the episode and shared an on-screen kiss.

In 2010, he made his directorial debut with the film Huge. In January 2011 he presented an episode of the BBC science series Horizon titled "What is One Degree?". Later in 2011 he reprised his role as James Lester in the TV series Primeval. From November 2011 he played the role of Louis Harvey in The Ladykillers at the Gielgud Theatre. On 23 July 2012, Miller began touring for his book, It's Not Rocket Science, from the Royal Society in London. He also appeared at the British Comedy Awards with Armstrong on Channel 4. In 2013, Miller took part in an episode of Room 101, and a Comic Relief special of game show Pointless. On 13 December 2014, he appeared in a Christmas edition of The Celebrity Chase.

From 2011 until the series three premiere in 2014, Miller starred in the BBC-French co-produced series Death in Paradise as Detective Inspector (DI) Richard Poole. A third series of Death in Paradise was commissioned for early 2014. On 9 April 2013 it was announced that Miller would be departing the series, to be replaced by actor Kris Marshall.

Miller explained he had personal reasons for the change: "It was the job of a lifetime, but logistically I just didn't feel I could continue. My personal circumstances just made it too complicated, but I will miss it like a lung. I love it here." Miller's wife had discovered she was pregnant after he had begun filming the first series. Their time apart caused strains on his relationship with her and their sons, so he wanted to spend more time with his family.

In 2014, Miller appeared in the feature film Molly Moon and the Incredible Book of Hypnotism. He also appeared with Billy Connolly and David Tennant in the film What We Did on Our Holiday. Miller guest starred in Doctor Who as the Sheriff of Nottingham in the third episode: "Robot of Sherwood".

Starring opposite Nancy Carroll and Diana Vickers, Miller played Robert Houston in the play The Duck House by Dan Patterson and Colin Swash. The show is a political satire based on the UK parliamentary expenses scandal.

In 2015, following the 800th anniversary of the Magna Carta, Miller starred as King John in Series 6 of Horrible Histories.

In October 2015, Miller along with Ruth Jones and Will Close, appeared in adverts for British supermarket Tesco as Roger with Jones as his wife Jo and Close as their son Freddie. In 2016, Miller co-presented alongside Rachel Riley and Romesh Ranganathan, the ITV entertainment series It's Not Rocket Science.

In February 2016 Miller issued a book, accompanied by a lecture tour, entitled The Aliens are Coming!, examining the question "are we alone in the universe?" That year, Miller played the role of Murray in the six-part BBC sitcom I Want My Wife Back, starring alongside Caroline Catz. In 2016 he appeared in the Channel 4 comedy Ballot Monkeys.

In 2018 he returned to the role of 'Bough', sidekick again to Rowan Atkinson's title character, in the film Johnny English Strikes Again. In September of that same year he played the role of Wolf Hall on the BBC sitcom Upstart Crow.

In November 2022, Miller released his seventh children's book Secrets of a Christmas Elf. In 2024, Miller acted as children's author Jullian Hartswood in the comedy drama Austin for Australian television network ABC TV, and produced by Northern Pictures and Lincoln Pictures.

== Personal life ==
Miller dated actress Rachel Weisz while they were both studying at Cambridge University during the early 1990s. He married actress Belinda Stewart-Wilson in 2004, and they had a son before divorcing in 2011. He married production executive Jessica Parker, the daughter of musician Alan Parker, in September 2013; they have a son and daughter. He has been diagnosed with obsessive–compulsive disorder (OCD). Despite reports to the contrary, in an interview with Roman Kemp on BBC Radio 5 Live in December 2024, Miller said he could not play the drums and did not know where this claim came from.

== Awards ==
In 2021, with the cast of Bridgerton, Miller received a nomination for the Screen Actors Guild Award for Outstanding Performance by an Ensemble in a Drama Series.

In 2025, Miller was nominated for a Logie award.

== Books ==
- It's Not Rocket Science (2014) Sphere ISBN 978-0-7515-4500-5
- The Aliens Are Coming!: The Exciting and Extraordinary Science Behind Our Search for Life in the Universe (2017) Sphere ISBN 978-0-7515-4504-3
- The Night I Met Father Christmas (2018) Simon & Schuster ISBN 978-1-4711-7153-6
- The Boy Who Made the World Disappear (2019) Simon & Schuster ISBN 978 - 1 - 4711 - 7267 - 0
- The Day I Fell into a Fairytale (2020) Simon & Schuster ISBN 978-1-4711-9243-2
- How I Became a Dog called Midnight (2021) Simon & Schuster ISBN 978-1-4711-9248-7
- Diary of a Christmas Elf (2021) Simon & Schuster ISBN 978-1-39850183-6
- How I Became a Dog Called Midnight (2022) Simon & Schuster ISBN 978-1-47119246-3
- The Night We Got Stuck in a Story (2022) Simon & Schuster ISBN 978-1-47119249-4
- Secrets of a Christmas Elf (2022) Simon & Schuster ISBN 978-1398515819
- Once Upon a Legend (2023) Simon & Schuster ISBN 978-1398515871
- Diary of a Big Bad Wolf (2024) Simon & Schuster ISBN 978-1398530362
- Robin Hood Aged 10 3/4 (2024) Simon & Schuster ISBN 978-1398515918
- Diary of a Puss in Boots (2025) Simon & Schuster ISBN 978-1398530393
- Diary of a Wicked Witch (2025) Simon & Schuster ISBN 978-1398541504
- The Night I Met Father Christmas (2025) Simon & Schuster ISBN 978-1398515802
- A Very Dangerous Pursuit (2026) HarperCollins ISBN 978-0008747459

== Filmography ==
=== Film ===
Year	Title	Role	Notes
1999	Plunkett & Macleane	Dixon	
2000	There's Only One Jimmy Grimble	Johnny Two Dogs	
2000	You Can't Dance		Short film
2000	Tip of My Tongue	Dave	Short film
2001	The Parole Officer	Colin	
2001	Birthday Girl	Concierge	
2003	Johnny English	Angus Jeremy Bough	
2003	The Actors	Clive	
2004	The Prince & Me	Søren	
2007	Razzle Dazzle: A Journey into Dance	Mr Jonathon	
2009	Within the Whirlwind	Krasny	
2010	4.3.2.1.	Mr. Philips	
2011	Johnny English Reborn	Angus Jeremy Bough	Scenes deleted
2014	The Incredible Adventures of Professor Branestawm	Mr. Bullimore	
2014	What We Did on Our Holiday	Gavin McLeod	
2017	Paddington 2	The Colonel	
2018	The Extraordinary Journey of the Fakir	Officer Smith	
2018	Johnny English Strikes Again	Angus Jeremy Bough	
2021	Off the Rails	Dan	
2022	This Is Christmas	Jonathan	
2024	Paddington in Peru	The Colonel	Cameo

=== Television ===
Year	Title	Role	Notes
1991	Murder Most Horrid	P.C. Watkins	Episode: "He Died a Death"
1992	The Pall Bearer's Revue		Episode: "Episode 3"
1993	French and Saunders		Episode: "The Silence of the Lambs"
1993	Paul Merton: The Series	Various	6 episodes
1995	You Bet!	Himself / various	Series 8, show 6
1995	Casualty	Daniel Murdoch	Episode: "Trials and Tribulations"
1995	Look at the State We're In!	Marty	Mini-series
1995	Sardines	Simon	TV film
1997	The Jack Docherty Show	Various	
1997–2001	Armstrong and Miller	Various Roles	27 episodes
1999	Hunting Venus	Gavin	TV film
1999	Passion Killers	Nick	TV film
1999	Coming Soon	Ben	TV film
1999	The Young Indiana Jones Chronicles: Daredevils of the Desert	French Officer	Video
2000	Cinderella	Dandini	TV film
2000	The Blind Date	Joe Maxwell	
2001	Dr. Terrible's House of Horrible	Rebenor	Episode: "Lesbian Vampire Lovers of Lust"
2002	Surrealissimo: The Trial of Salvador Dalí	Yoyotte	TV film
2002	The Book Group	Martin Logan	2 episodes
2002	Jeffrey Archer: The Truth	Roland Moxley-Nemesis	TV film
2004	Agatha Christie's Marple	Basil Blake	TV film; "The Body in the Library"
2004	Doc Martin	Stewart James	Episode: "The Portwenn Effect"
2004–06	The Worst Week of My Life	Howard Steel	17 episodes
2005	Malice Aforethought	Dr. Edmund Bickleigh	TV film
2005	Doc Martin	Stewart James	Episode: "Out of the Woods"
2006	Popetown	The Priest	10 episodes
2006	Saxondale	Bernard Langley	Episode: "Episode No. 1.6"
2007–11	Primeval	James Lester	30 episodes
2007–10	The Armstrong & Miller Show	Various Roles	19 episodes
2008–09	Moving Wallpaper	Jonathan Pope	18 episodes
2008	Moving Wallpaper: The Mole	Jonathan Pope	2 episodes; uncredited
2009	The Catherine Tate Show	Ghost of Christmas Past	Episode "Nan's Christmas Carol"
2009	QI	Himself	Comedy Panel Show; Episode "The Future"
2011–2014, 2021	Death in Paradise	DI Richard Poole	Series 1–3, 10; 18 episodes
2011	Episodes	Himself	1 episode
2011	Felix and Murdo	Various	
2013	Room 101	Himself	1 episodes
2014	This is Jinsy	Chief Acco / Berpetta	1 episode
2014	Doctor Who	Sheriff of Nottingham	Episode: "Robot of Sherwood"
2015	Horrible Science	Professor McTaggart (voice)/various	10 episodes
2015	Asylum	Dan Hern	3 episodes
2015	Mr. Bean: Funeral	Mourner who sits next to Mr. Bean	TV short
2015	Ballot Monkeys	Kevin Sturridge	5 episodes
2015	Horrible Histories	King John	1 episode
2016	It's Not Rocket Science	Co-presenter	
2016	I Want My Wife Back	Murray	
2017	Tracey Ullman's Show	Rupert Murdoch	2 episodes
2018	Tracey Breaks the News	Rupert Murdoch	
2018	Upstart Crow	Wolf Hall	Episode: "If You Prick Us, Do We Not Bleed?"
2019	Sticks and Stones	Chris Carter	Short Series; 3 episodes
2020	Bridgerton	Lord Featherington	Main role
2021–present	Professor T.	Jasper Tempest (Professor T.)	Main role
2021	Scotland: Escape to the Wilderness	Himself	Episode 3
2021	All Star Musicals	Himself	Christmas special
2022	The Great Celebrity Bake Off for Stand Up to Cancer	Himself	Series 5 episode 4; contestant & Star Baker
2022	Suspect	Richard	
2023	No Place Like Home	Himself	1 episode
2024–present	Austin	Julian Hartswood	8 episodes

== Filmmaking credits ==
Year	Title	Writer	Producer	Director	Notes
1995	Sardines	Yes	No	No	TV movie
1996	MindGym	Yes	No	No	Video game
1997–2001	Armstrong and Miller	Yes	No	No	27 episodes
2005	Starry Night	No	No	Yes	Short film
2006	Saxondale	No	No	Yes	Episode: "Pigeons"
2009–2010	The Armstrong and Miller Show	Yes	Yes	No	12 episodes
2010	Huge	Yes	No	Yes	
2011	Comedy Showcase	No	Yes	No	Episode: "Felix & Murdo"
2015	Horrible Science	No	Yes	No	10 episodes
2024	Austin	Yes	Yes	No	8 episodes
