= Armstrong and Miller (TV series) =

British comedy sketch television show

- Written by: Alexander Armstrong; Ben Miller; Bert Tyler-Moore; George Jeffrie; David Mitchell; Robert Webb; Michael McLeod; Aidan Hawkes
- Starring: Alexander Armstrong; Ben Miller
- Country of origin: United Kingdom
- Original language: English
- No. of series: 4
- No. of episodes: 27

Production
- Production company: Absolutely Productions

Original release
- Network: Paramount Comedy Channel (1997); Channel 4 (1999–2001)
- Release: 5 February 1997 – 23 February 2001

Armstrong and Miller – later retitled The Armstrong and Miller Show – is a comedy sketch television show that aired between 1997 and 2001 featuring Alexander Armstrong and Ben Miller, known together as Armstrong and Miller. Following a series on the Paramount Comedy Channel in 1997, a further three were made for Channel 4.

The duo moved to BBC One in 2007 with The Armstrong & Miller Show.

== Production ==
Four series were produced by Absolutely Productions. The first series was made for the Paramount Comedy Channel, the subsequent three series were broadcast on Channel 4 (Series 2 was also repeated on Paramount). The title was Armstrong and Miller for the first two series, and The Armstrong and Miller Show for the last two.

=== DVD release ===
The fourth series has been released on DVD.

== Chronology ==
Series	Title	Episodes	Start and end dates	Channel	Notes
1	Armstrong and Miller	6 × 25 mins	5 February – 12 March 1997	Paramount Comedy Channel	Channel 4 screened a 40m Armstrong And Miller compilation on 7 April 1997
2	Armstrong and Miller	7 × 25 mins	10 November 1997 – 5 January 1998	Channel 4	Repeated on Paramount Comedy Channel 7 January – 11 February 1998
3	The Armstrong and Miller Show	6 × 25 mins	13 August – 17 September 1999	Channel 4	Channel 4 screened a 30 min Armstrong And Miller's Festive Highlights compilation on 22 December 1999
4	The Armstrong and Miller Show	7 × 25 mins	12 January – 23 February 2001	Channel 4	Released on DVD
