= Alexander Armstrong =

English actor, comedian, broadcaster and singer (born 1970)

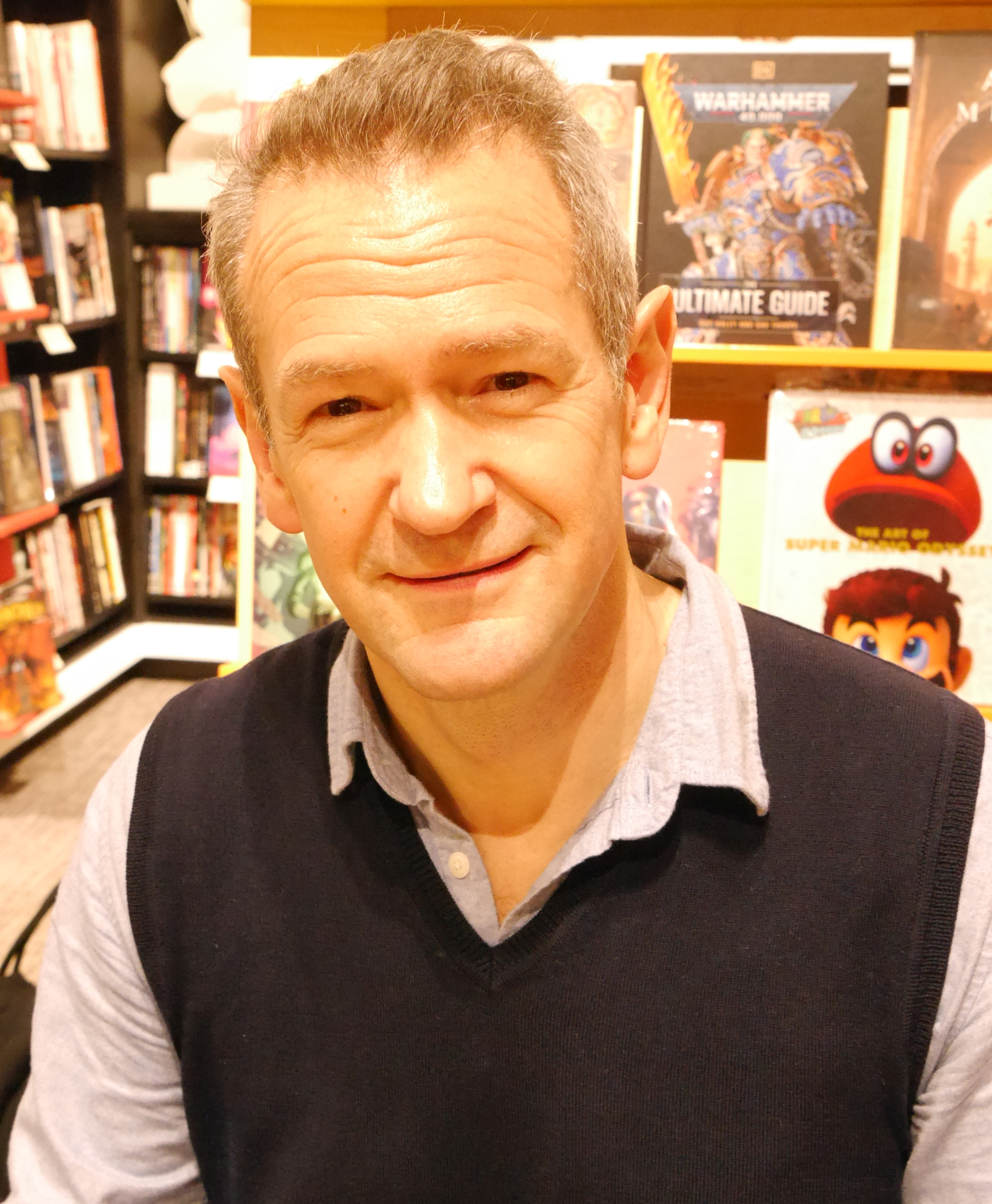
- Armstrong in 2024
- Born: Alexander Henry Fenwick Armstrong; 2 March 1970 (age 56); Rothbury, Northumberland, England
- Other names: Xander Armstrong; Alex Armstrong
- Education: Mowden Hall School; St Mary's Music School; Durham School; University of Cambridge
- Occupations: Actor; comedian; broadcaster; singer
- Years active: 1994–present
- Spouse: Hannah Snow (m. 2004)
- Children: 4
- Relatives: Rex Armstrong (grandfather); Lucius Thompson-McCausland (grandfather); Alastair King (brother-in-law); Giles Coren (brother-in-law)

Alexander Henry Fenwick Armstrong (born 2 March 1970), sometimes credited as Xander Armstrong, is an English actor, comedian, broadcaster and singer. He hosts the BBC One game show Pointless, and presents a show on Classic FM.

Armstrong is a member of the comedy duo Armstrong and Miller, with Ben Miller. His television credits include Armstrong and Miller, Beast, Life Begins, Hunderby and Danger Mouse. He is the voice of Mr Smith, Sarah Jane Smith's alien supercomputer in The Sarah Jane Adventures and the series four two-part finale of Doctor Who. He is also the narrator for the hit CBeebies show Hey Duggee.

Armstrong is a bass-baritone singer and has released three studio albums.

== Early life ==
Armstrong was born at Rothbury Community Hospital in Rothbury, Northumberland, on 2 March 1970, and grew up in Longframlington, the youngest of three children of Henry Angus Armstrong, a physician, and his wife Emma Virginia, a daughter of Lucius Thompson-McCausland. He was educated at Mowden Hall School in Stocksfield, St Mary's Music School, Edinburgh, where he was a chorister at St Mary's Episcopal Cathedral between the ages of 11 and 13, then, as a music scholar, at Durham School, and Trinity College, Cambridge, where he read English and was a choral scholar in the Choir of Trinity College, Cambridge, in which he sang bass baritone.

He plays the piano – a skill which has been seen in action in several The Armstrong & Miller Show sketches – and while in Edinburgh also played the cello, which he dropped at Durham in favour of the "much more masculine" oboe.

He joined the Footlights in his final year as part of the writing team for the 1992 revue and was Spooks creator David Wolstencroft's comedy partner.

== Career ==
After graduating in 1992, Armstrong moved to London with friends to pursue a career in acting and comedy. While waiting for acting roles, he worked in several north London bars and restaurants. He was eventually introduced to Ben Miller, who had also moved to London, through Jez Butterworth. In 1996, Armstrong and Miller performed at the Edinburgh Festival Fringe and were nominated for the Perrier Award.

=== Comedy ===
Armstrong and Miller co-starred in four series of Armstrong and Miller from 1997 to 2001, while also performing sketches in The Sunday Format. The duo decided to take a break and split for several years to forge their own solo careers. Armstrong renewed his partnership with Ben Miller for the award-winning The Armstrong and Miller Show in 2007. The Armstrong and Miller Book was released in October 2010.

Armstrong appeared in BBC Radio 4's The Very World of Milton Jones, broadcast between 1998 and 2001. He narrated the animated cartoon series The Big Knights in 1999; it first appeared on BBC1 that Christmas. That same year he also starred as Prince Charming in ITV's Christmas pantomime, alongside Ben Miller, Samantha Janus, Paul Merton, Harry Hill, Frank Skinner and Ronnie Corbett. Between early 2000 and early 2001, Armstrong starred as a misanthropic, animal-hating vet in the BBC One sitcom Beast, and he has also been the star of a series of TV commercials for Pimm's.

On BBC Radio 4, Armstrong played John Weak in the office sitcom Weak at the Top. He also played Martin Baine-Jones for the Times Online's Timeghost podcast. Between September and November 2010, Armstrong took The Armstrong and Miller Show on tour in the UK, completing 62 dates. This was the second time The Armstrong and Miller Show had toured, the first tour being in autumn 2001.

=== Television presenting ===
On 1 September 2006, Armstrong was chairman of the short-lived Channel 4 panel show Best of the Worst which featured team captains David Mitchell and Johnny Vaughan. Armstrong presented the short-lived ITV1 quiz series Don't Call Me Stupid, in which mismatched celebrities taught each other a subject they are passionate about before facing a studio quiz on their new topic. He has been a frequent guest host on the BBC's satirical Have I Got News for You, having appeared 32 times; he has, to date, made the most appearances of any guest, whether as host or panellist. In 2008, he was the presenter and narrator for When Were We Funniest? and was the only person to feature in all 12 episodes. Armstrong in The Independent was reported to not want to be "pigeonholed" as a presenter, preferring to focus on acting and comedy.

Armstrong has been the presenter of the BBC One game show Pointless, initially with former Cambridge University friend Richard Osman, since it began in 2009. He also presented a documentary, Alexander Armstrong's Very British Holiday, for the BBC on 8 November 2009 about the history of the "great British summer holiday" and his attempts to explore its modern version. On 30 May 2011, Armstrong hosted the pilot for a new panel show, Alexander Armstrong's Big Ask for Dave with Dave Lamb, Katy Brand, Griff Rhys Jones and Robert Webb. After a positive response to the pilot, Dave commissioned the first series, which first aired on 6 February 2012. In July 2011, Armstrong became a co-presenter on BBC One's The Great British Weather. In August 2011, he began presenting Epic Win on BBC One.

In 2012–2013, Armstrong co-hosted ITV series Prize Island with Emma Willis. On 3 January 2015, Armstrong and Rochelle Humes co-hosted entertainment special Frank Sinatra: Our Way on BBC One.

On 1 June 2015, Armstrong presented a documentary, Rome's Invisible City, which used 3D scanning technology to discover the underground spaces below the city. Subsequently, it was announced he would be making a three-part series exploring the lost and hidden sites of Florence, Naples, and Venice.

In 2015, Armstrong presented a three-part factual series for ITV, called Alexander Armstrong in the Land of the Midnight Sun, in which he travelled half-way round the Arctic Circle meeting its inhabitants and exploring their ways of life. In January 2016, he guest-presented Bruce's Hall of Fame on BBC One.

In 2017, Armstrong presented Don't Ask Me Ask Britain and Teach My Pet to Do That, both on ITV.

=== Singing and music ===
After over a decade in television and comedy, Armstrong returned to his musical roots and put together his own cover band, which plays a wide range of music from jazz to rock to pop classics. A classically trained bass baritone, he is the vocalist and is backed up by Harry the Piano on keyboards, Simon Bates on woodwind, Jeff Lardner on drums and Dave Swift on bass. The band's first tour ran from 19 September to 6 November 2013.

Armstrong mainly sang at his local parish church services or at weddings, away from the public eye. Armstrong impersonated Susan Boyle's Britain's Got Talent rendition of "I Dreamed a Dream" in the show Your Face Sounds Familiar and surprised the judges by singing in falsetto. He sang "Winter Wonderland" during the celebrities Christmas special of Pointless and "No Rhyme for Richard" from Blondel in BBC Two's Tim Rice: A Life in Song and collaborated with the Sixteen to record the single "Good King Wenceslas" to raise funds for the charity Crisis.

Since September 2014, Armstrong has presented the Saturday afternoon programme on the classical radio station Classic FM. He now also presents the mid-morning show on weekdays between 10 am and 1 pm.

Armstrong participated in VE Day 70: A Party to Remember on 9 May 2015, a televised commemorative concert from Horse Guards Parade in London, where he sang "We Must All Stick Together" by Ralph Butler and Raymond Wallace, and "London Pride", a patriotic song by Noël Coward. He sang in Songs of Praise: The Big Sing, broadcast on 20 September 2015, a special programme from the Royal Albert Hall to commemorate Queen Elizabeth II becoming the world's longest-serving monarch, singing "I Would Be True".

On 6 November 2015, Armstrong released his debut solo vocal album, A Year of Songs, on Warner Music Group's East West Records label. It reached number six on the UK Albums Chart in its first week and topped the UK Classical Chart, the first time a comedian/actor has reached number 1 in that chart. In January and February 2016 he carried out a 9-date UK tour with his band.

In June 2016 he began recording his second album, Upon a Different Shore, which was released on 28 October. It reached number eight on the UK Albums Chart.

In December 2017, he narrated Prokofiev's Peter and the Wolf for children. Armstrong's version was recorded under the Warner Classics label with the Royal Liverpool Philharmonic Orchestra.

A third studio album, In a Winter Light, was released in November 2017.

== Other work ==
In 1997, Armstrong and Ben Miller provided the voices for lead characters for the PC game Wings of Destiny, published by Psygnosis in 2000, as British airmen and Nazi officers covering the two comic-book plots in the game. From 2002 to 2009, Armstrong appeared in a series of British television adverts for the drink Pimm's. With Miller, he has formed a production company called Toff Media. In 2002, Armstrong provided the voice for the character "Horse" in the English dub of the series A Town Called Panic.

In 2009, Armstrong portrayed the British microcomputer innovator Clive Sinclair in the BBC docu-drama Micro Men. Set in the early 1980s, the film focused on the semi-broken friendship and rivalry between Clive Sinclair and Acorn Computers head Chris Curry when both companies were angling for the lucrative BBC computer literacy deal. Micro Men was directed by Saul Metzstein, and starred Armstrong opposite Martin Freeman as Chris Curry.

A book based on Armstrong's show Pointless, titled The 100 Most Pointless Things in the World, was published in the UK in October 2012 by Coronet, an imprint of Hodder & Stoughton. It was written by Armstrong and his Pointless co-host, Richard Osman.

Also, in 2012, Armstrong was the voice of Professor M for the animation breaks for the McLaren F1 team, with the animations called Tooned (also featuring the voices of Lewis Hamilton and Jenson Button) broadcast on Sky Sports F1.

In 2013, Armstrong and Miller appeared in the television advertising campaign for Spitfire Ale.

In 2014, Armstrong provided the narrator's voice for CBeebies animation Hey Duggee. In September 2014, it was announced that Armstrong would succeed David Jason as the voice of Danger Mouse in the 2015 revival of the 1980s animated series. Armstrong has done other voiceover work, including Mr Wolf and Captain Dog in Peppa Pig.

In 2019, Armstrong also cameoed in Horrible Histories: The Movie as Procurator Catus Decianus.

In January 2024, Armstrong participated in the fifth series of The Masked Singer UK as the character "Chicken Caesar". He was eliminated and unmasked in the second episode.

== Honours ==
In December 2015, Armstrong was awarded an honorary doctorate from Northumbria University.

In 2017, he was made president of the P. G. Wodehouse Society (UK).

== Personal life ==
Armstrong is descended from a North East landowning family, and his distant relation, William Armstrong, was created Baron Armstrong in 1887. Alexander's paternal grandfather was the rugby player and physician Rex Armstrong and his maternal grandparents were economist Lucius Thompson-McCausland, High Sheriff of Hertfordshire, and Helen Laura McCausland (6 April 1903 – February 2000), granddaughter of Captain Conolly Thomas McCausland (13 May 1828 – 25 June 1902), High Sheriff of County Londonderry, by his wife the Hon. Laura St John (12 June 1842 – 21 October 1919), daughter of the 15th Baron St John of Bletso. His McCausland ancestors held land at Drenagh in Limavady, County Londonderry, from the 18th century.

In 2004, Armstrong married Hannah Bronwen Snow; they have four sons. He met his wife, who is an events organiser for Harvey Nichols, when a friend introduced them. In July 2014 they moved from North Kensington, west London, to a 26-acre (11 ha) farm in Bledington in Gloucestershire near the Oxfordshire border.

In February 2011, Armstrong became President of the Literary and Philosophical Society of Newcastle upon Tyne, launching a million-pound appeal at a special gala event. He is a patron of several charities, including Family Links, the Charlie Waller Memorial Trust and Just A Drop.

== Political views ==
In an interview with The Independent in March 2012, Armstrong said that his family had traditionally voted for the Liberal Democrats. Armstrong described himself as a "floating voter", stating: "I'm not greatly impressed by party politics, but I am by individual people. I'm a centrist, and very suspicious of any tribalism." He also spoke of his support for the rural campaigning organisation the Countryside Alliance, saying: "I'd like people to be honest about what they don't like about country sports, because if it's actually the people you don't like then I'd much rather they would actually just say that." He has appeared in their advertisements and magazine to promote countryside shooting.

In August 2014, Armstrong was one of 200 public figures who were signatories to a letter to The Guardian expressing their hope that Scotland would vote to remain part of the United Kingdom in September's referendum on that issue.

In 2017, Armstrong urged the UK Government to do more to support music education and therapy, saying "in the weft and weave of politics I think these sorts of human stories get shoved to one side, but we have to make sure they are right up front and centre. It's not all about Brexit."

In 2020, Armstrong signed a letter in support of the LGB Alliance, to "stand in solidarity" with JK Rowling.

In 2024, Armstrong voiced his opposition to the Labour government's taxation of private school fees, saying that he wanted the best for his children. In the same interview, he voiced opposition to inheritance tax being charged on family farms, saying: "We're farmers, of farming stock. We're very much affected."

== Filmography ==
=== Television ===
==== Non-presenting roles ====
Year	Work	Role	Channel	Notes
1995	You Bet!	Doctor Watson	ITV	Series 8, show 6 Guest appearance
1995	The Thin Blue Line	Unnamed Gentleman	BBC One	S1E6 "Kids Today"; Guest appearance (credited as "Alex Armstrong")
1996	Sharpe	Lord John Rossendale	ITV	
1996	Troma's Basement	Himself		Credited as Xander Armstrong
1998	Is It Legal?	Nick	Channel 4	S3E5; Guest appearance
1998–2000	Stressed Eric	Ray Perfect		Voice only (credited as "Xander Armstrong")
1999	The Big Knights	Narrator	BBC One	Voice only (credited as "Xander Armstrong")
2000–2001	Beast	Nick	BBC One	
2001	Dr. Terrible's House of Horrible	Michael Masters	BBC Two	Episode 1
2002	I Saw You	Peter	ITV	
2002	TLC	Dr Stephen Noble	BBC Two	
2002	Time Gentlemen Please	Dean	Sky One	
2004–2006	Life Begins	Phil Mee	ITV	
2005	Marple	DI Craddock	ITV	"A Murder Is Announced"
2006	Saxondale	TV presenter	BBC Two	S1E2; Guest appearance
2007–2011	The Sarah Jane Adventures	Mr Smith	CBBC	Voice only
2007	After You've Gone	Dr Howard Banks	BBC One	S1E7; Guest appearance
2007	Hotel Babylon	Aiden Spencer	BBC One	S2E6; Guest appearance
2007	Christmas at the Riviera	Reverend Miles Roger	ITV	TV movie
2007	To the Manor Born	Adam Forbes-Hamilton	BBC One	Christmas special Guest appearance
2008	Doctor Who	Mr Smith	BBC One	S4E12 "The Stolen Earth" (voice only); S4E13 "Journey's End" (voice only)
2008	Mutual Friends	Patrick Turner	BBC One	
2009	Micro Men	Clive Sinclair	BBC Four	
2009–2012	Ben & Holly's Little Kingdom	Fairy Mayor/Lucy's Dad/Grandpapa Thistle	Nick Jr./Channel 5	Voice only
2010	The Trial of Tony Blair	David Cameron	More4	
2010	Reggie Perrin	David	BBC One	Series 2, 5 episodes Guest appearance
2011	Doctor Who	Reg Arwell	BBC One	S7EX "The Doctor, the Widow and the Wardrobe"
2011	Rev.	Patrick Yam	BBC Two	One episode
2011–present	Peppa Pig	Captain Daddy Dog/Mr. Wolf	Nick Jr./Channel 5	Voice only
2012	Hacks	David Bullingdon MP	Channel 4	
2012	Love Life	Dominic	ITV	
2012	Hunderby	Brother Joseph	Sky Atlantic	
2012–2014	Tooned	Professor M	Sky Sports F1	Voice only
2014	Not Going Out	Himself	BBC One	Series 7, Episode 5: "Pointless"
2014–present	Hey Duggee	Narrator	CBeebies	Voice only
2015–2019	Danger Mouse	Danger Mouse	CBBC	Voice only (also voices Danger Mouse in live stage show at Butlins in 2017)
2015	Cockroaches	Doctor	ITV2	
2015	The Sound of Music Live	Max Detweiler	ITV	UK adaptation of The Sound of Music Live!
2017	Lip Sync Battle UK	Himself	Channel 5	
2020	Have I Got 30 Years for You	Himself	BBC One	
2020	Michael McIntyre's The Wheel	Himself	BBC One	
2020	Anthony	Himself	BBC One	
2021	Who Wants to Be a Millionaire? Celebrity Special	Himself/Contestant	ITV	
2022	Celebrity Catchphrase	Himself/Contestant	ITV	
2022	The Wheel	Himself/Celebrity expert	BBC One	
2024	The Masked Singer UK	"Chicken Caesar"	ITV1	
2024	Beat the Chasers	Himself/Contestant	ITV1	(season 5 episode 6)

==== Presenting roles ====
Year	Title	Role	Channel	Notes
2003–present	Have I Got News for You	Guest presenter	BBC One	Most frequent guest presenter to have appeared on the show
2006	Best of the Worst	Presenter	Channel 4	
2009–present	Pointless	Co-presenter	BBC Two/BBC One	With Richard Osman until 2022, with rotating guest presenters each doing 11 episodes each since 2022.
2011	The Great British Weather	Co-presenter	BBC One	
2011	Epic Win	Presenter	BBC One	
2011–2013	Alexander Armstrong's Big Ask	Presenter	Dave	
2013	Your Face Sounds Familiar	Contestant	ITV	
2013	Prize Island	Co-presenter	ITV	With Emma Willis
2013	The 12 Drinks of Christmas	Co-presenter	BBC Two	With Giles Coren
2014	Alexander Armstrong's Real Ripping Yarns	Presenter	BBC Four	
2015	Frank Sinatra: Our Way	Co-presenter	BBC One	One-off special; with Rochelle Humes
2015	Sunday Night at the Palladium	Presenter	ITV	Guest presenter; 1 episode
2015	Alexander Armstrong in the Land of the Midnight Sun	Presenter	ITV	
2015	Rome's Invisible City	Presenter	BBC One	One-off special
2016	Bruce's Hall of Fame	Presenter	BBC One	Stand-in presenter for Bruce Forsyth
2017	Italy's Invisible Cities	Co-presenter	BBC One	With Dr. Michael Scott
2017	Don't Ask Me Ask Britain	Presenter	ITV	
2017	Teach My Pet To Do That	Presenter	ITV	
2017	A Very Royal Wedding	Presenter	ITV	One-off documentary
2017	Sheridan	Presenter	ITV	One-off special
2018	The Imitation Game	Presenter	ITV	Comedy panel show
2020	Britain's Favourite Christmas Songs	Presenter	Channel 5	One-off special
2021	The Queen and Her Cousins with Alexander Armstrong	Presenter	ITV	One-off documentary
2021	Iceland with Alexander Armstrong	Presenter	Channel 5	Three-part documentary series
2022	South Korea with Alexander Armstrong	Presenter	Channel 5	Three-part documentary series
2023	Alexander Armstrong in Sri Lanka	Presenter	Channel 5	Three-part documentary series
2023	Buckingham Palace with Alexander Armstrong	Presenter	Channel 5	Six-part documentary series
2025	Perfect Pub Walks	Presenter	More4	Four-part series
2026	Alexander Armstrong Across America	Presenter	Channel 5	Upcoming documentary series
2026	Alexander Armstrong In India	Presenter	Channel 5	Upcoming three-part documentary series

=== Film ===
Year	Work	Role	Notes
1994	There's No Business...	Tim	Starring Raw Sex
1997	Mojo	BBC Announcer (voice)	Credited as Xander Armstrong
1999	Plunkett & Macleane	Winterburn	
2001	Birthday Girl	Robert Moseley	Credited as Xander Armstrong
2005	Match Point	Mr Townsend	
2006	Scoop	Unnamed policeman	Guest appearance
2009	Skellig	Mr Hunt	
2010	Jackboots on Whitehall	Red Leader	
2019	Horrible Histories: The Movie – Rotten Romans	Catus Decianus	

=== Radio ===
- December 1998 – Children's Hour with Armstrong and Miller (BBC Radio 4)
- 2005–2006 – Weak at the Top (BBC Radio 4)
- July 2006 – Private Passions (BBC Radio 3)
- June 2020 – Hall of Fame (Classic FM)

== Video games ==
- 2000 – Team Buddies
- 2003 – Hidden & Dangerous 2

== Discography ==
=== Studio albums ===
Title	Details	Peak chart positions	Certifications
Title	Details	UK	Certifications
A Year of Songs	Released: 5 November 2015; Label: East West; Format: CD, digital download	6	BPI: Gold
Upon a Different Shore	Released: 28 October 2016; Label: East West; Format: CD, digital download	8	
In a Winter Light	Released: 24 November 2017; Label: East West; Format: CD, digital download	24	

== Bibliography ==
=== As author ===
Fiction

- Armstrong, Alexander (2024). Evenfall: The Golden Linnet. Farshore. ISBN 978-0008551582.
- Armstrong, Alexander (2026). Evenfall: The Tempest Stone. Farshore. ISBN 978-0008551612.
