= Armstrong and Miller =

British comedy double act

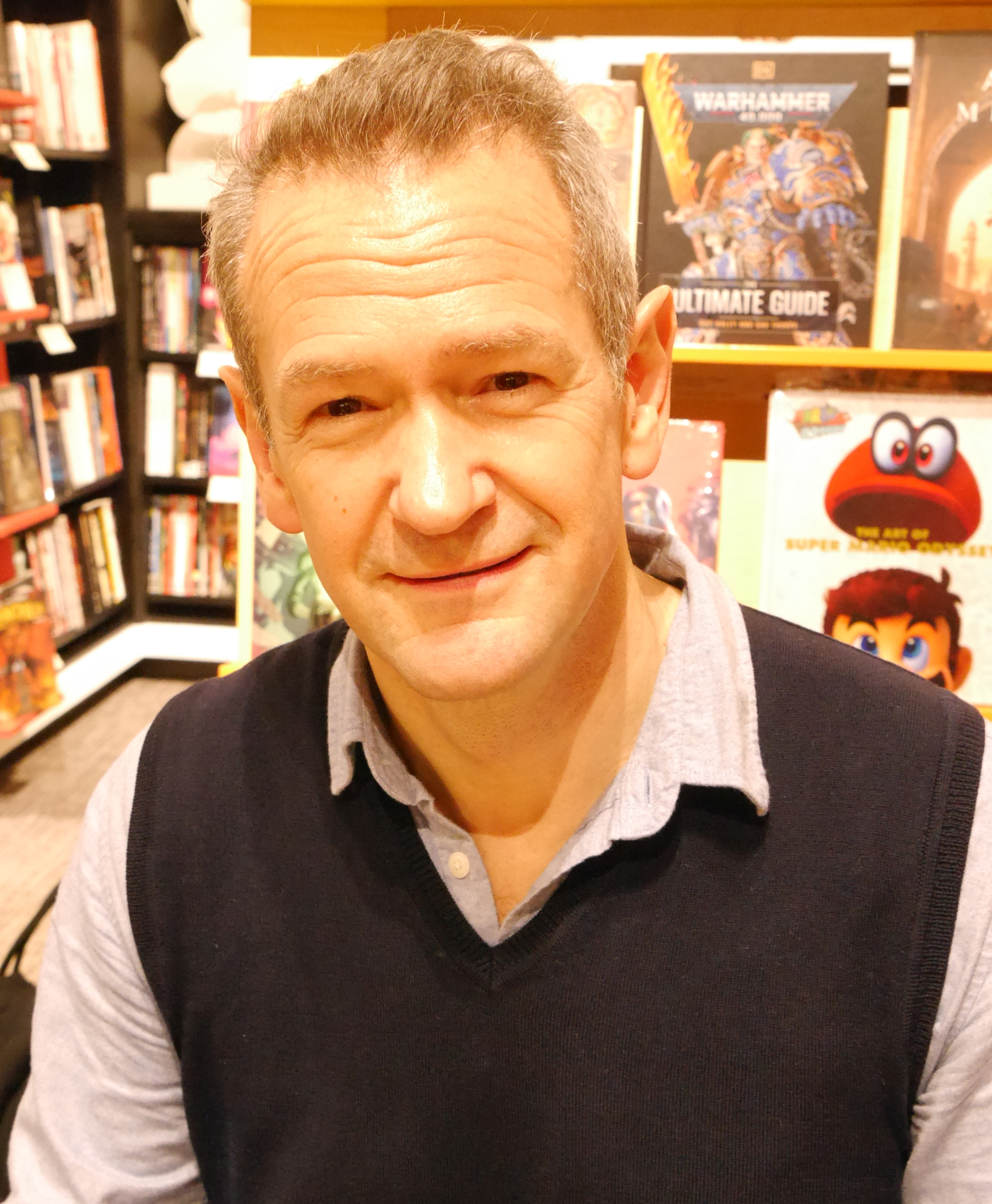

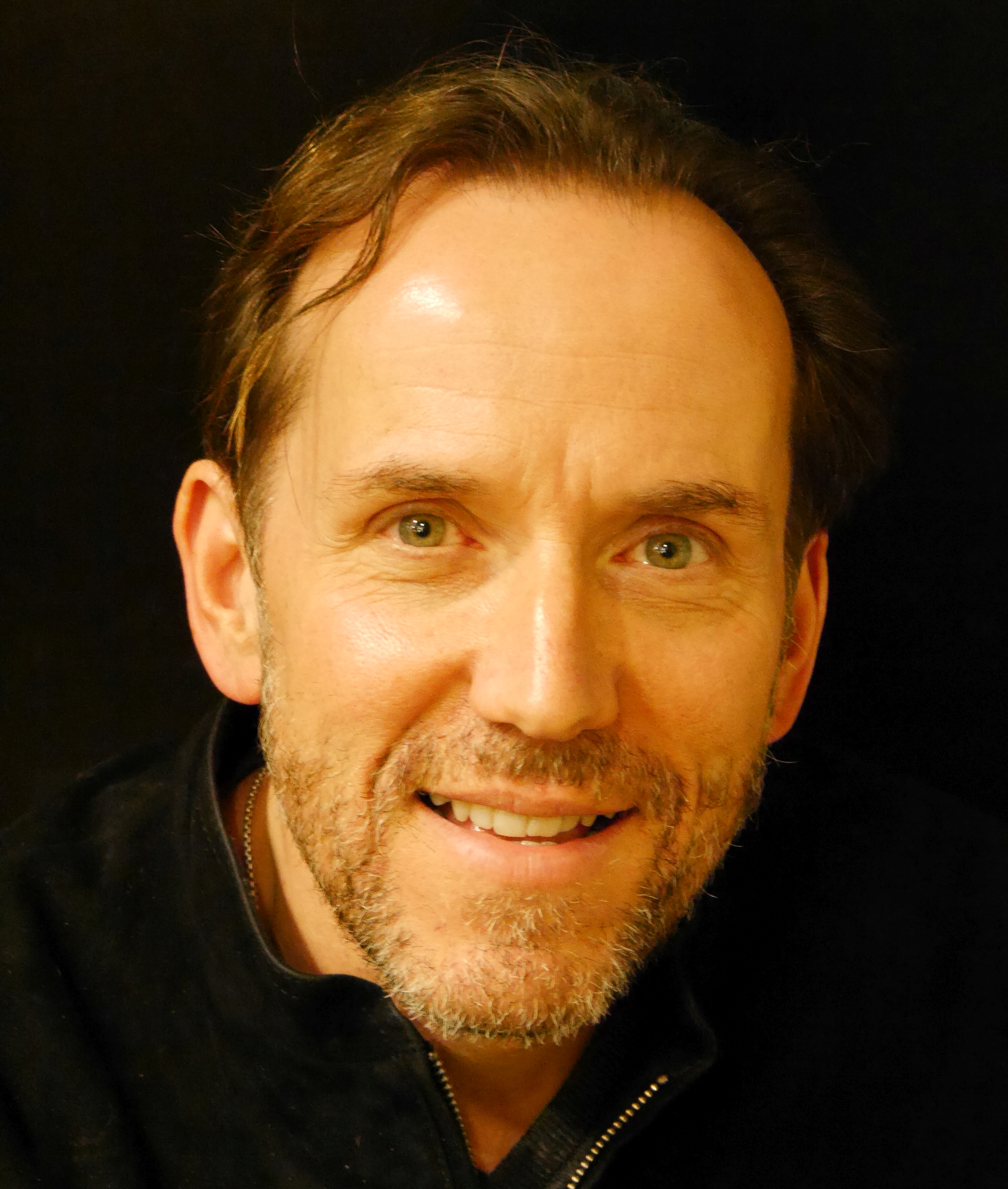
Armstrong in 2024 (left) and Miller in 2019 (right)
- Notable work: Armstrong and Miller (1997 TV series); The Armstrong & Miller Show (2007 TV series)

Comedy career
- Years active: 1997–present
- Medium: Television; radio; stage
- Genre: Sketch comedy
- Subjects: British culture; satire
- Members: Alexander Armstrong; Ben Miller

Armstrong and Miller are an English comedy double act consisting of the actor-comedians Alexander Armstrong and Ben Miller. They have performed in two eponymous television sketch shows, the satirical Timeghost podcast, and many individual television appearances.

== Works ==
=== Radio ===
Armstrong and Miller was a short-lived radio programme originally broadcast in March 1998. There were four 15-minute episodes and it was broadcast on BBC Radio 4. In addition to Alexander Armstrong and Ben Miller it starred Samuel West, and Tony Gardner.

The Children's Hour was a four-part comedy programme originally broadcast in 1998. It starred Alexander Armstrong and Ben Miller as media journalists Craig Children and Martin Bain-Jones in a spoof music/children's/cultural review programme.

=== Television ===
==== Saturday Live ====
Under the guise of Norwegian rock band "Strijka", Armstrong and Miller featured on several episodes of Saturday Live in 1996.

==== Armstrong and Miller ====
Four series of the show have been made by Absolutely Productions, the first airing in 1997. The first two were titled Armstrong and Miller, and the last two The Armstrong and Miller Show. The first series, shown on the Paramount Comedy Channel, had six episodes and the subsequent series, all first shown on Channel 4, consisted of seven episodes. The second series was immediately repeated on the Paramount Comedy Channel after its initial broadcast.

The fourth series of the show was released on DVD in the UK in 2006.

==== The Armstrong & Miller Show ====
After the conclusion of the first show, the duo split and branched into acting and presenting, amongst other things. After some five years in hiatus, they renewed their partnership for a new show produced by Hat Trick Productions for BBC One. The first studio recording took place on Friday, 23 February 2007, at BBC TV Centre and was first broadcast on 26 October 2007.

During an appearance on British chat show Friday Night With Jonathan Ross on Friday 25 September, it was confirmed that the second series of The Armstrong & Miller Show would begin airing on BBC One on 16 October 2009. There were six episodes in the series.

Following the success of the first few series, they published a book, The Armstrong & Miller Book, in early October 2010 based on the characters from the show. The third series of the show began airing on BBC One on 30 October 2010.

=== Podcasts ===
In August 2008 they launched a series of podcasts entitled Timeghost, parodying art and culture critics.

=== Other collaborations ===
In the mid 1990s the duo recorded wraparound segments for Troma films broadcast in the UK on the Bravo network, with Armstrong being credited as Xander Armstrong.

They also wrote and starred in So 90s, a weekly comedy show which aired on MTV Europe between 1997 and 1999. They collaborated on a one-off sitcom called Felix and Murdo, broadcast on Channel 4 on 28 December 2011.

They collaborated with fellow Footlights alumni Mitchell and Webb for the 2009 Red Nose Day fundraising event. They co-wrote and starred in several short sketches, including one incorporating Armstrong and Miller's World War II airmen characters.

Due to media commitments they rarely do nationwide tours, the most recent one taking place from September to November 2010.

In 2018, Armstrong and Miller presented a one-off show called We Are Most Amused and Amazed to mark the 70th birthday of Charles, Prince of Wales.

== Toff Media ==
The pair have formed a production company named Toff Media.
