= Piers Taylor =

British architect (born c. 1967)

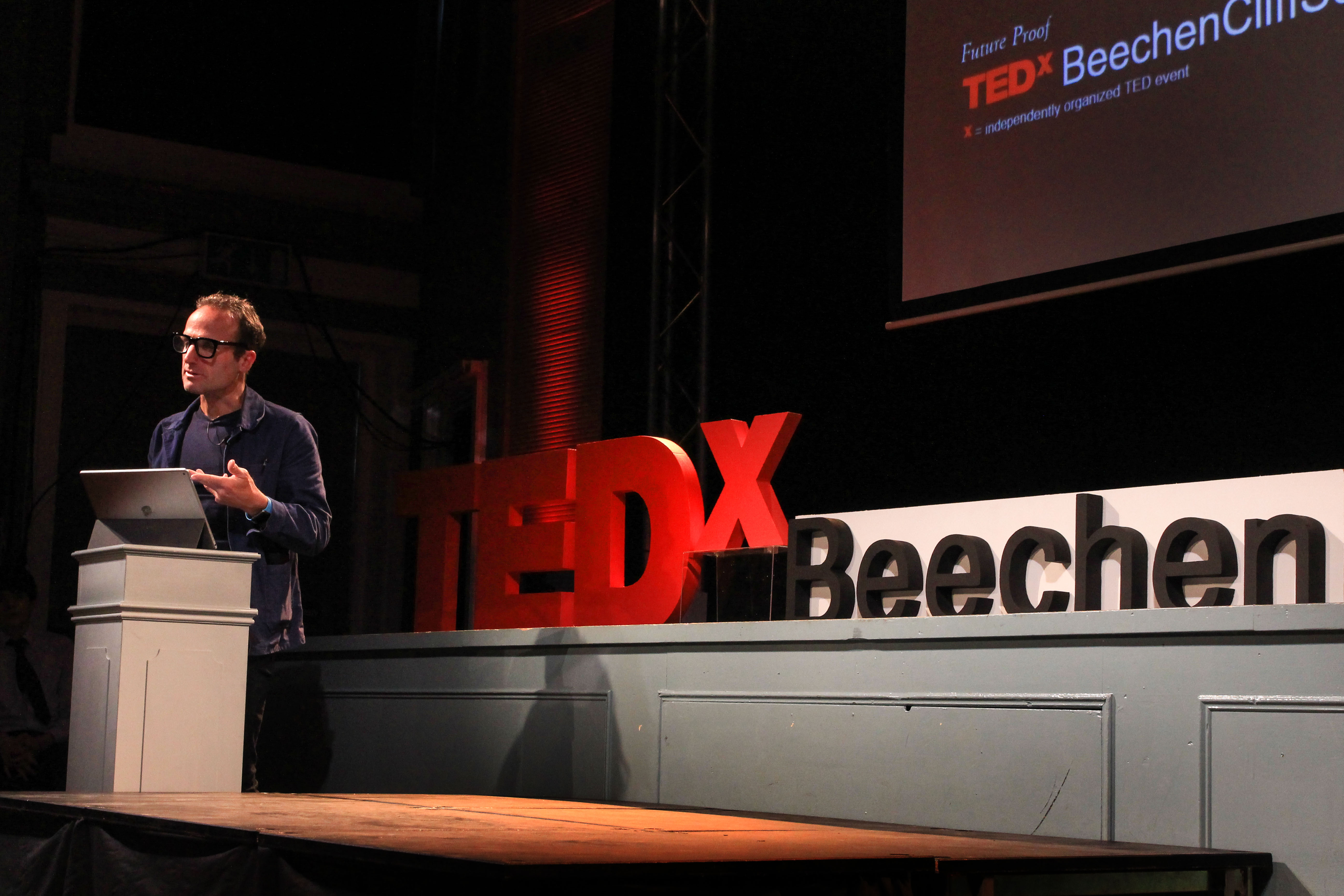
- Taylor at the 2017 TEDx Beechen Cliff School
- Born: c. 1967 (age 58–59); England
- Education: University of Technology Sydney
- Occupations: Architect and TV presenter
- Website: invisiblestudio.org

Piers Taylor (born 1967/1968) is a British chartered architect and co-presenter of BBC Two series such as The House That £100k Built and The World's Most Extraordinary Homes. His work has received awards from the Architects' Journal and the Royal Institute of British Architects. His approach to design is characterised by simplicity, cost-effectiveness and sustainability.

== Education ==
Taylor went to Australia when he was 22 years old to study at the University of Technology Sydney. He started in graphic design but changed to architecture after attending lectures by Australian architect Glenn Murcutt, who would become an inspiration for Taylor's career.

He was also a student at the Bartlett School of Architecture, later commenting about his experience with the toxic culture at the school, and mentioned walking out from a review panel with Simon Allford.

Since 2017, Taylor is pursuing a PhD degree at the University of Reading, with research in alternative design processes that incorporate making, under the supervision of Flora Samuel. He collaborated with Samuel in the 2021 Homes of the Future report for Vodafone, which predicts technological features such as home drones, the elimination of light switches, smart heating, and pet-caring robots.

== Career ==
In 2006, he founded the Mitchell Taylor Workshop together with Rob Mitchell, now Mitchell Eley Gould, resigning in 2012 to start his current practice, Invisible Studio. He decided to break with the prevailing corporate culture of mainstream architectural practices and conventional designs, sending an email to his contacts which talked about a studio "which is a provocative and polemical vehicle for collaboration, experimentation, research and education". Invisible Studio does not have employees, using collaborations for each project instead.

=== Selected projects ===
==== Moonshine ====
He was awarded the AJ's Small Projects 2009 prize for his own family home and studio, located in the woodland near Bath. Called "Moonshine", the home is a renovated 18th-century crenellated schoolhouse, with an added wing that Taylor built himself, carrying materials across a 600-metre steep incline due to a lack of vehicular access at the time. Taylor has since renovated the house for improved robustness and energy efficiency, 18 years after first building it. He replaced floors, walls, windows and roof with upgraded materials, and added cladding and insulation to achieve passive house standards.

==== Room 13 ====
Community art studio in Hareclive primary school in Hartcliffe, south Bristol that is run by the children who use it, working with artists in residence Shani Ali and Paul Bradley. Room 13 was finished in 2007 and won a RIBA National Award that year The building was constructed from raw concrete blocks, and features ceiling openings for light and ventilation.

==== Trailer (Equivalent #2) ====
A cabin made with unseasoned timber from the surrounding woods and supported with a steel chassis. It is clad in fibreglass and lined with recovered plywood, designed to be low cost and portable in public highways.

==== Ghost barn ====
Prototyping workshop in Wiltshire used by Invisible Studios and events such as the "Studio in the Woods". The project was optimized for building efficiency, for example with a single size for all timber pieces, and took less than two weeks to complete.

==== Wolfson Tree Management center ====
Two timber maintenance and staff facility buildings located in Westonbirt Arboretum in Gloucestershire, commissioned by the Forestry Commission. This project won the RIBA National Award 2017, the RIBA South West Award 2017, and the RIBA South West Sustainability Award 2017. Built in partnership with the engineering firm Buro Happold, the structures used timber from the arboretum, including English oak, larch, Corsican pine and Douglas fir, which was milled on site.

=== Teaching ===
Piers Taylor held a teaching position at the Architectural Association School of Architecture (AA), setting up and being the first Studio Master for the Design & Make Programme at Hooke Park. He continues to lead hands-on educational projects for architecture students such as the annual "Studio in the Woods". He was a speaker at the TEDx Beechen Cliff School in 2017, with a talk on architecture, and the TEDxBath 2018, with a talk on radical making.

=== Television and documentaries ===
From 2013 to 2017 Taylor co-presented, with Kieran Long, The House That £100k Built in BBC Two. In the spin off series, The £100k House: Tricks of the Trade, Taylor and co-host Robert Jamison help people with their home improvements while staying on a limited budget.

From 2017 he was a co-presenter along with actress and property developer Caroline Quentin of BBC Two's series The World's Most Extraordinary Homes, which is also in Netflix. In the show Taylor and Quentin visit properties in different countries and environments, including the 747 Wing House.

In 2020 Taylor was featured in the first episode of the documentary series Practice, created by architecture critic and curator Laura Mark and photographer and filmmaker Jim Stephenson. The film focuses on the process of architecture, and presents Taylor's own approach with conversations and shows him building a cabin in the woods.

== Style and approach ==
Taylor is known for stripped-back, innovative, cost and resource-effective designs which avoid extraneous elements to focus on light and space.

His practice is interested in environmental impact of their designs, focusing on the long-term carbon footprint. He was influenced by his years in Australia during the early stages of his careers, and by the three Australian architects Glenn Murcutt, Peter Stutchbury and Richard Leplastrier. Taylor's designs often try to follow Murcutt's dictum "touch the ground lightly", as best exemplified by his woodland timber structures.

== Personal life ==
Taylor is married and has three children.
