= Tony Duquette =

American artist

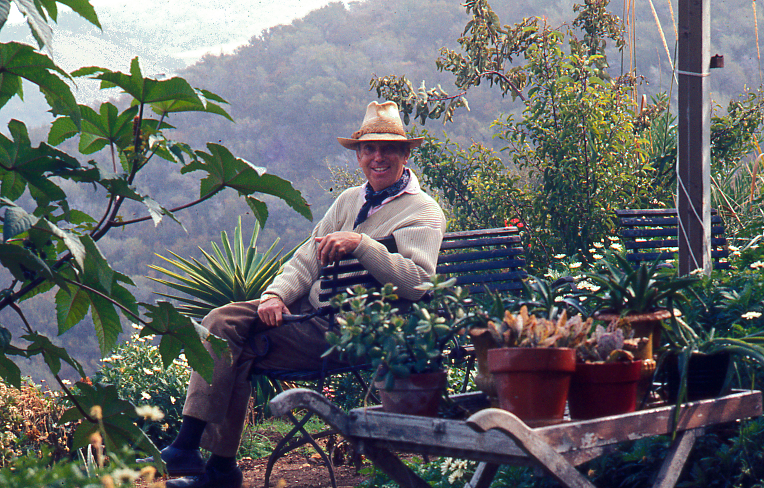
- Duquette at his ranch in Malibu
- Born: Anthony Duquette; 11 June 1914; Los Angeles, California, U.S.
- Died: 9 September 1999 (aged 85); Los Angeles, California, U.S.
- Occupations: Artist, designer, costume and set designer for stage and film
- Years active: 1935–1999
- Spouse: Elizabeth Duquette (1949–1995)
- Website: tonyduquette.com

Anthony Duquette (June 11, 1914 – September 9, 1999) was an American artist who specialized in designs for stage and film.

== Early life and education ==
Duquette was born in Los Angeles, California. He was the oldest of four children. He grew up between Los Angeles, where he wintered with his family, and Three Rivers, Michigan, where they lived the rest of the year. As a student, Duquette was awarded scholarships at both the Chouinard Art Institute in Los Angeles and the Yale School of the Theatre.

After graduating from Chouinard, he began working in advertising, creating special environments for the latest seasonal fashions. He also began to free-lance for designers such as William Haines, James Pendleton and Adrian. In the early 1940s, Duquette's parents and siblings moved permanently to Los Angeles, where Duquette had been living since 1935. During this time Duquette was discovered by designer and socialite Elsie de Wolfe. Through the patronage of de Wolfe and her husband Sir Charles Mendl, Duquette established himself as a prominent designer in Los Angeles. He worked increasingly for films, including many Metro Goldwyn Mayer productions under the auspices of producer Arthur Freed and director Vincente Minnelli.

== Career ==
=== 1935–1946 ===
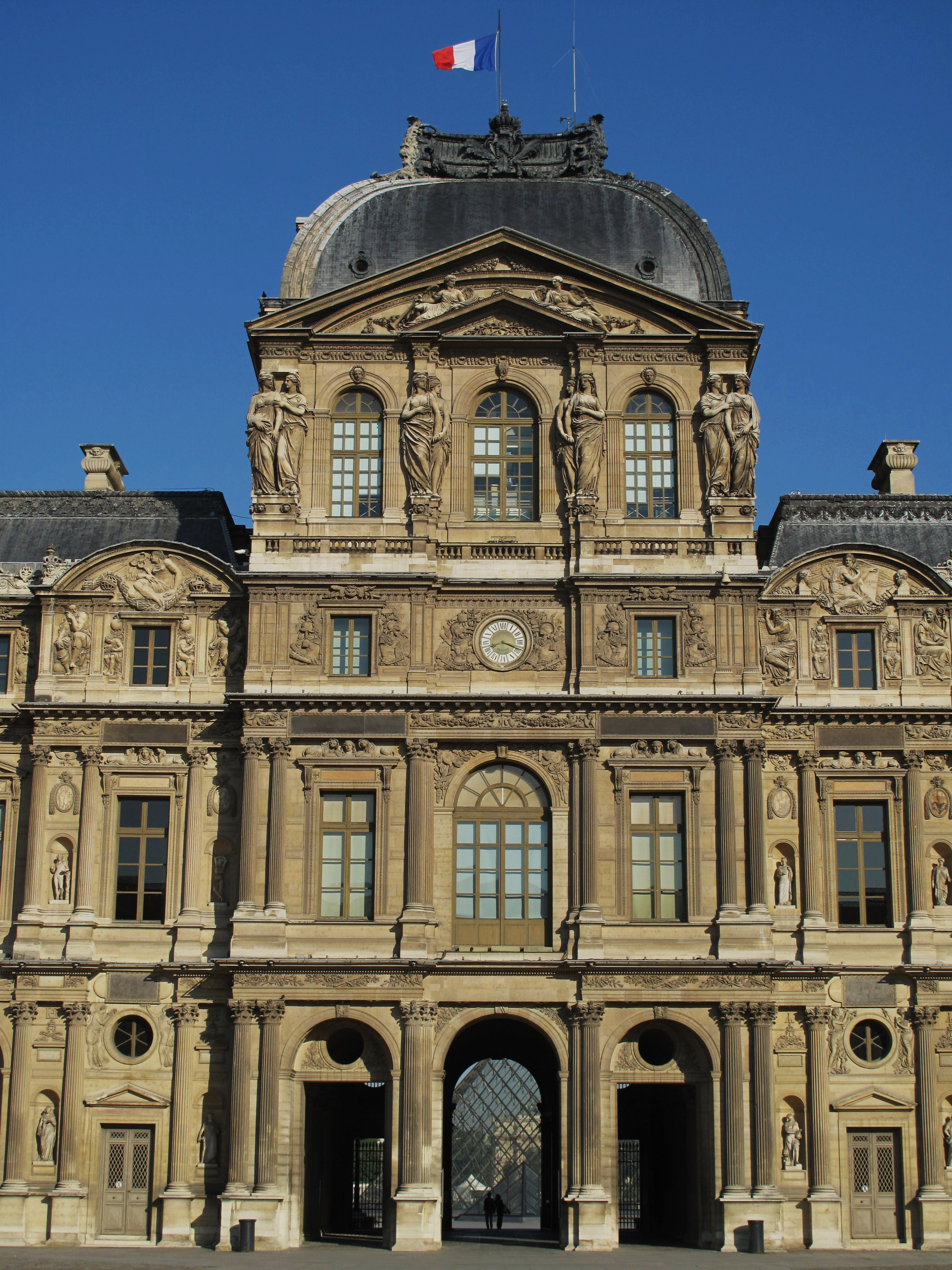
Duquette presented some of his work in the Louvre during the post-war years.

Duquette designed costumes and settings for the movies, interiors for Mary Pickford and Buddy Rogers, jewelry and special furnishings for Lady Mendl, as well as numerous night clubs and public places.

He served in the United States Army for four years during the Second World War and received an honorable discharge. After the liberation of Paris, he accompanied Sir Charles and Lady Mendl on their return trip to Europe and was introduced to their friends on the continent.

=== 1947–1960 ===
Upon his return from Europe in 1947, Duquette continued his works for private clients and for the theatre and motion pictures. He presented his first exhibition at the Mitch Liesen Gallery in Los Angeles in 1949 and shortly thereafter was asked to present his works at the Pavilion de Marsan of the Louvre Museum, Paris. Duquette was the first American artist to have a one-man show at the Louvre. Returning from a year in France, where he received design commissions from the Duke and Duchess of Windsor and the Alsatian industrialist Commandant Paul Louis Weiller, Duquette held a one-man showing of his works at the Los Angeles County Museum of Art.

There followed other one-man exhibitions of Duquette's works, including at the M. H. de Young Museum and Palace of the Legion of Honor in San Francisco, the California Museum of Science and Industry and Municipal Art Gallery in Los Angeles, the El Paso Museum of Art, the Santa Barbara Museum of Art, the Museum of the City of New York, as well as one-man exhibitions in Dallas, Chicago, Rio de Janeiro and Phoenix, Arizona.

In 1956, with his wife Elizabeth (known as Beegle), he opened a salon in the converted silent film studios of actress Norma Talmadge, where they entertained friends such as Arthur Rubenstein, Aldous Huxley and Jascha Heifitz.

=== 1960–1970s ===
During the 1960s and '70s, the Duquettes continued to travel extensively, working in Austria, Ireland and France as well as New York, Dallas, San Francisco, South America and Asia. Duquette created interiors for Doris Duke, Norton Simon, and J. Paul Getty, a castle in Ireland for Elizabeth Arden and a penthouse in the Hawaiian Islands. He also designed interiors for commercial and public spaces like the Hilton Hawaiian Village, Sheraton Universal Hotel, and sculptures and tapestries for the Ritz Carlton Hotel in Chicago as well as the Los Angeles Music Center and the University of California at Los Angeles. Designs for film and theatre include Yolanda and the Thief, Lovely to Look At, Kismet, and Ziegfeld Follies for MGM, as well as Jest of Cards, Beauty and the Beast, and Danses Concertantes for the San Francisco Ballet. Operas for which Duquette designed both costumes and settings include Der Rosenkavelier, The Magic Flute, and Salome. His designs for the original Broadway production of Camelot won Duquette the Tony Award for Best Costume Design.

His monumental work of environmental art Our Lady Queen of the Angels was created as a gift to the people of Los Angeles in honor of that city's lyrical name and in celebration of the bicentennial. This multi-sensorial exhibit was seen by hundreds of thousands of visitors over a three-year period at the California State Museum of Science and Industry at Exposition Park. As part of the unique experience of "ethnic angels," Duquette included a poetic narration by Ray Bradbury, spoken by Charlton Heston. Duquette embellished the celebratory experience with original music by Garth Hudson (reissued in 2005). The size of the building added to the effect, where from the 80 foot ceiling hung an 18-foot Madonna, dressed in an ornate and symbolic gown. She was surrounded by angels and alters and jeweled tapestries. All of this was enhanced by special lighting effects which changed the Madonna's facial color "to represent the four races." Duquette researched angels and learned every major world religion (Catholic, Jewish, Moslem, Buddhist, Hindu believes in the same eight archangels. "Duquette writes that his 'Angels' exhibit stresses over and over again 'the brotherhood of man, which is an implied theme of this 'celebration." He stated, "It is my hope that this celebrational environment, into which I have poured the aspirations of a lifetime, will transport the viewer to another dimension."

Duquette designed furniture and chandeliers for Long Beach-based Buffums including at branches in La Habra Fashion Square and Pomona Mall.

==== Cultural impact ====
In 1979, the Duquettes formed the Anthony and Elizabeth Duquette Foundation for the Living Arts, a non-profit public foundation whose purpose is to present museum-quality exhibitions of artistic, scientific, and educational value to the public and to purchase, promote and preserve Duquette's own works. Exhibitions have been presented by the foundation at California's Mission San Fernando and through the Los Angeles Unified School District including "Designs for the Theatre", "The Art of the Found Object" and "The Fabric Mosaic Tapestry". The foundation has sponsored exhibitions and lectures on the decorative arts in Los Angeles, San Francisco, New York, and Texas in conjunction with museums and other foundations and on the university level through the UCLA extension series. An exhibition was presented in San Francisco honoring Saint Francis of Assisi, the patron saint of that city. To house the exhibition, Duquette purchased an abandoned synagogue which he restored and renamed The Duquette Pavilion of Saint Francis.

=== 1980s–Death ===
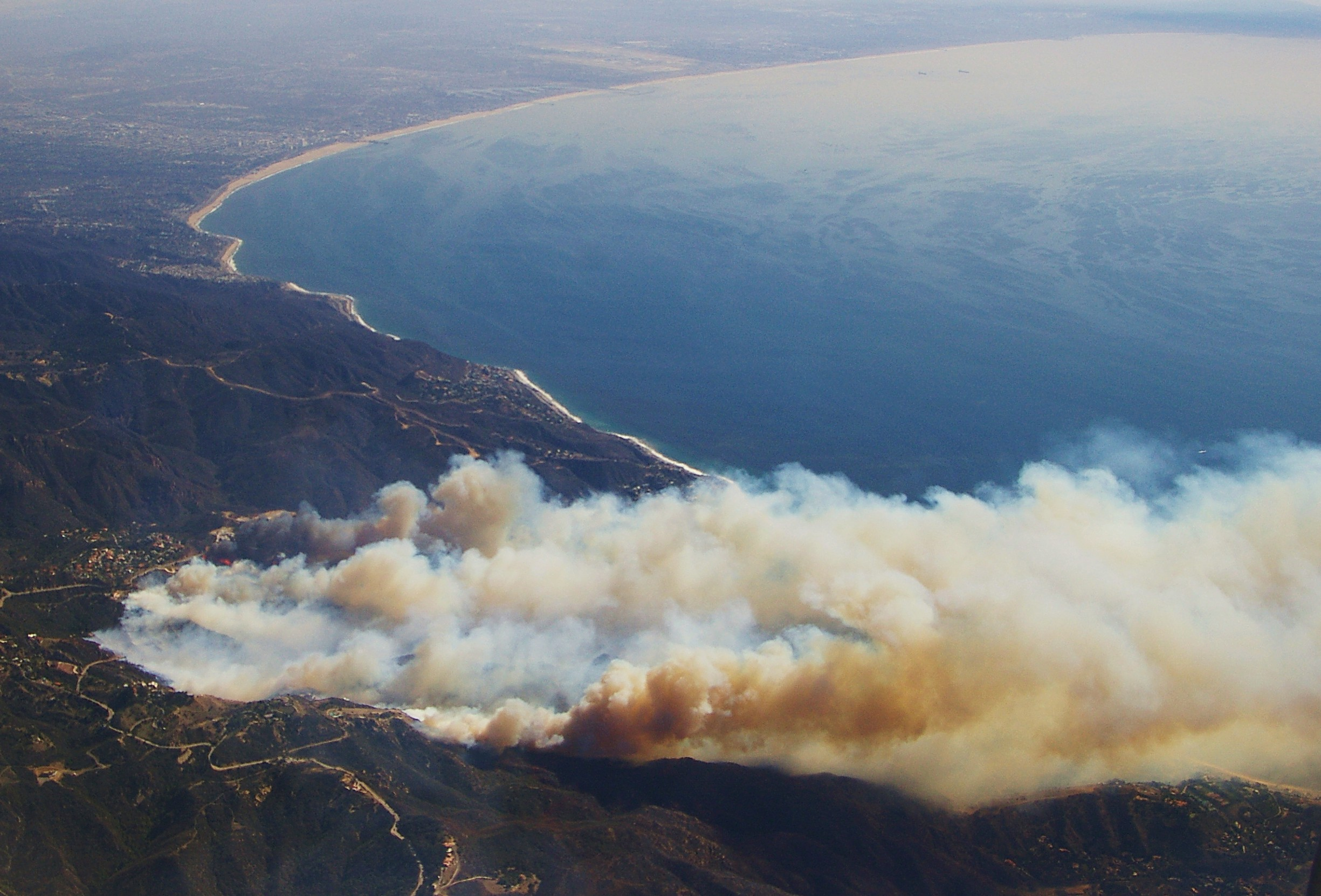
A fire such as this one in Malibu destroyed much of Duquette's work at his residence.

Final projects, which he completed with the assistance of his business partner and design collaborator of 30 years, Hutton Wilkinson, included interiors for an 18th-century Parisian apartment located on the Place de Palais Bourbon in Paris and interiors for the 12th century Palazzo Brandolini on the Grand Canal in Venice.

== Loss by Fire ==
=== Saint Francis fire of 1983 ===
Much of Duquette's original art in the Duquette Pavilion was destroyed in a fire. Included in the destruction was a work titled Celebrational Environments, consisting of 28-foot-tall metal sculptures and 20-by-20-foot jewel-studded fabric mosaic tapestries.

=== Malibu fire of 1993 ===
Following the fire in San Francisco, the Duquettes focused their efforts on construction at his 150-acre ranch in the Malibu Mountains of California. Calling it Sortilegium, which is Latin for "fortune-telling", Duquette strove to create a living work of art. After many years of work, this was also destroyed, by the Green Meadow fire of 1993. The work in progress had been extensively chronicled on television and by national and international magazines before its complete destruction. The Malibu property was bought in 2007 and architect David Randall Hertz was hired to design a home on one of the previous Duquette building pads. Following Duquette's legacy, Hertz designed a house from the wings of a Boeing 747-100, appropriately known as the 747 Wing House. Ten years later, Hertz purchased part of the property from Duquette's long time collaborator Hutton Wilkinson. He named the property Xanabu and continued restoring and revitalizing Duquette's legacy.

== Personal life ==
=== Marriage ===
In 1949, Duquette married artist Elizabeth "Beegle" Johnstone at a private ceremony at Pickfair, with Mary Pickford as matron of honor and Buddy Rogers as best man. The reception that followed was attended by Hollywood celebrities including Gloria Swanson, Greta Garbo, Fred Astaire, Vincente Minnelli, Louella Parsons, Hedda Hopper, Oscar Levant, Vernon Duke, and Marion Davies. The young couple collaborated on many design commissions and were active on the Hollywood social scene. After 46 years of marriage and artistic collaboration with Duquette, Elizabeth died from Parkinson's disease in Los Angeles. Up until his death at the age of 85, Duquette continued designing interiors, jewelry and works of art. For his 80th birthday, he created a new work entitled "The Phoenix Rising from His Flames", which was presented to UCLA at the Armand Hammer Museum of Art and Cultural Center in Los Angeles.

=== Death ===
On September 9, 1999, Duquette died of a heart attack at UCLA Medical Center in Los Angeles. He was 85 years old.

== Legacy ==
Duquette's house in Beverly Hills, "Dawnridge", continues as the headquarters for the design business, headed by Duquette's longtime collaborator Hutton Wilkinson.
