= The House That £100k Built =

- Genre: Factual
- Presented by: Kieran Long; Piers Taylor
- Country of origin: United Kingdom
- Original language: English
- No. of series: 3
- No. of episodes: 18 (list of episodes)

Production
- Executive producer: Annette Clarke
- Editor: Joff Wilson
- Production company: Remarkable Television

Original release
- Network: BBC Two; BBC Two HD
- Release: 18 September 2013 – 31 March 2017

The House That £100k Built is a British factual television series that was first broadcast on BBC Two on 18 September 2013. The programme was commissioned for a second series as well as a new series - The House that £100k Built: Tricks of the Trade in January 2014.

== Transmissions ==
Series	Episodes	Originally released	
Series	Episodes	First released	Last released
1	6	18 September 2013	23 October 2013
2	6	14 July 2015	18 August 2015
3	6	22 February 2017	31 March 2017

== Episode list ==
=== Series 1 (2013) ===
No. overall	No. in series	Title	Original release date	UK viewers (millions)
1	1	"Martin"	18 September 2013	2.63
2	2	"Sumati"	24 September 2013	1.99
3	3	"Ruth and Tony"	2 October 2013	2.08
4	4	"Tom and Zoe"	9 October 2013	2.19
5	5	"Jane and Andy"	16 October 2013	1.87
6	6	"Justin and Mary"	23 October 2013	2.02

=== Series 2 (2015) ===
No. overall	No. in series	Title	Original release date
7	1	"Wajid and Anam"	14 July 2015
8	2	"Marcus and Sholto"	21 July 2015
9	3	"Andrew and Claire"	28 July 2015
10	4	"Jo'ann and Andy"	4 August 2015
11	5	"Heidi and Steven"	11 August 2015
12	6	"Sue and Tim"	18 August 2015

=== Series 3 (2017) ===
No. overall	No. in series	Title	Original release date
13	1	"Alistair & Karen"	22 February 2017
14	2	"Derek & Christine"	1 March 2017
15	3	"Jason & Riikka"	8 March 2017
16	4	"Neil & Amanda"	15 March 2017
17	5	"Lesley & Kevin/Sue & Tim"	22 March 2017
18	6	"Jody & Lori"	31 March 2017

== Reception ==
Express & Star was disappointed by the series, saying the problem was that it was "obsessed with the budget, and cost cutting, and this made it a little depressing" and it "did not have the drama of some of the other house building programmes". Time Out gave the series two stars out of five.

Calor was concerned by a scene in the series showing how to recycle a gas cylinder as a light fitting. It warned of the dangerous nature of the activity and illegality. The scene was subsequently removed from the programme and BBC iPlayer. However the scene will be included on the Australian release, 7Two stating that it is common practice in Australia already.

== International broadcast ==
- Australia - On air promotions airing on 7Two from 9 January 2015 indicate the series will be airing on the channel in early 2015.
- United States - Netflix and Amazon Prime began streaming the program to the North American market in late 2019 early 2020.
