= David Randall Hertz =

American architect, inventor and educator

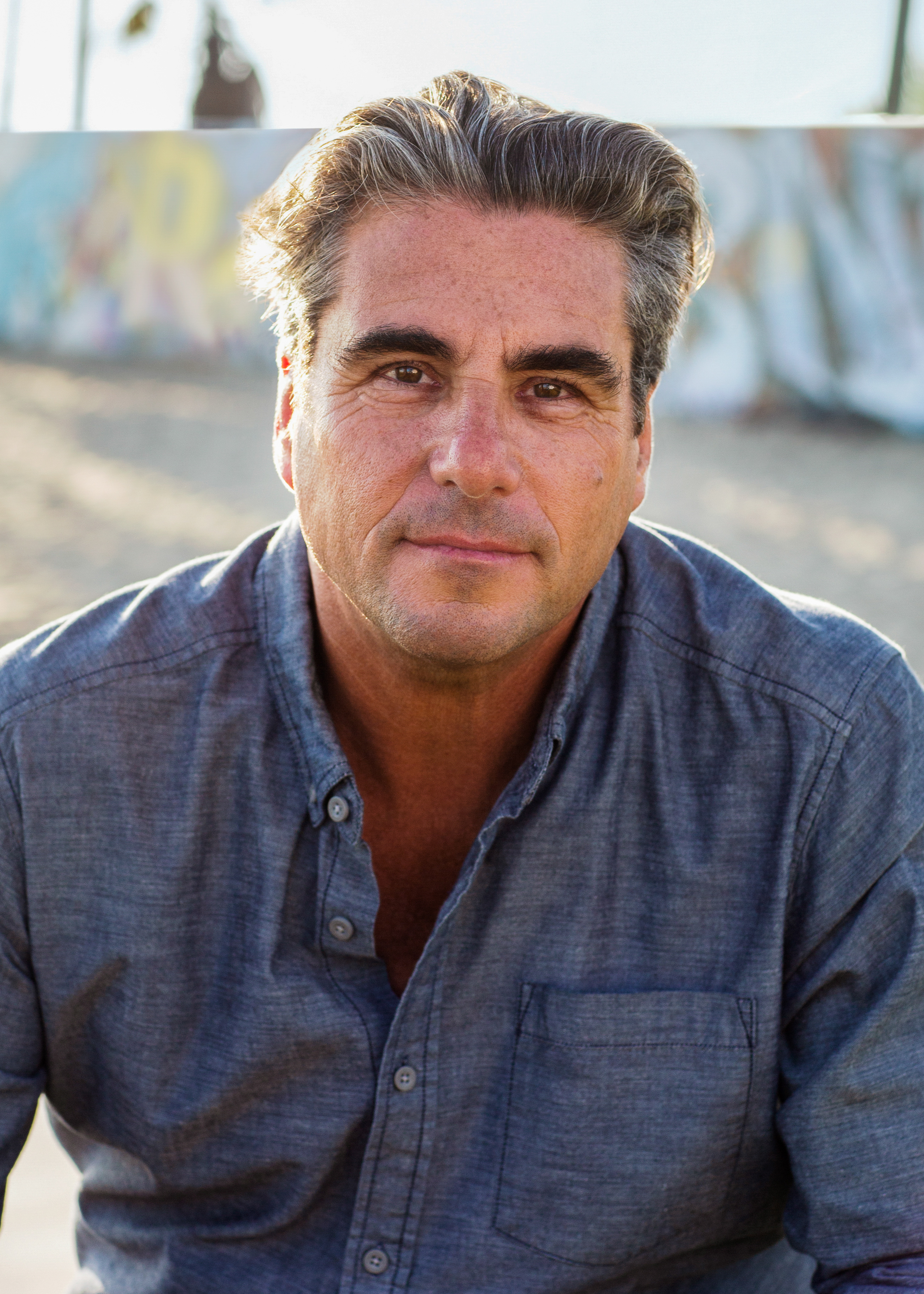
- Born: October 6, 1960; Los Angeles, California
- Education: Southern California Institute of Architecture
- Occupation: Architect
- Spouse: Laura Doss-Hertz
- Practice: Studio of Environmental Architecture
- Buildings: 747 Wing House
- Website: davidhertzfaia.com

David Randall Hertz (born October 6, 1960) is an American architect, inventor and educator. He is known for his work in sustainable architecture and as an early innovator in the development of recycled building materials.

== Biography ==
David Randall Hertz was born on October 6, 1960, in Daly City, California, to parents Joanne and Robert Hertz. The family moved to Los Angeles when Hertz was 6 months old and he grew up in Venice and Malibu.

Hertz got his start in architecture at a young age. In high school he was introduced to the building's designer, famed Los Angeles architect John Lautner. Hertz apprenticed under Lautner for four years. After receiving a degree from the Southern California Institute of Architecture in 1980, Hertz went on to work in the office of Frank Gehry before founding his firm, Syndesis, in 1983. That year, Hertz developed Syndecrete, a form of concrete that incorporates post-consumer and industrial waste, such as polypropylene carpet fibers and fly ash. It is lighter than traditional concrete and may have other waste products such as wood, crushed glass, or plastic chips added for decoration. In 1995 MoMA included Syndecrete in the "Mutant Materials in Contemporary Design" exhibit.

In 2004, Hertz became certified in Leadership in Energy and Environmental Design (LEED). In 2007 he founded Studio of Environmental Architecture SEA, based in Venice Beach, California. SEA focuses on environmentally sustainable buildings, including high-efficiency lighting and water systems, solar panels, and solar water heating. In 2008 the prestigious American Institute of Architects recognized Hertz as FAIA fellow. The fellowship is the highest membership honor for architects for their exceptional work and contributions to architecture and society. Hertz was the youngest member selected in AIA's 152-year history.

Hertz is involved in constructing environmentally beneficial residences and commercial buildings, primarily in and around Venice, California. His architectural and material work has been exhibited internationally. Hertz's recent speaking engagements include a presentation at TEDx in 2013 and 2015 promoting sustainability and green building. In 2014, American Institute of Architects (AIA) featured residences designed and built by Hertz in the Los Angeles Monograph Tour. In 2015, KCRW featured Hertz in their Art Talk episode "Daring and Inspirational Architecture Around the World". In 2016, he spoke at the Greenbuild Expo in Los Angeles on historical and cutting-edge technology of extracting drinking water from the air. In 2015 ORO Editions published a monograph titled The Restorative Home: Ecological Houses by David Hertz, which focuses on residential homes Hertz designed throughout his career. In 2016 a team led by Hertz won the Grand Prize of the Water Abundance XPRIZE. The competition's goal was to make more than 2,000 liters of water in 24 hours using 100% renewable energy at the cost of less than 2 cents/ liter. In April 2017, Hertz sold his home residence known as "Californication House" for US$14.6 million and purchased Tony Duquette's former property in Malibu.

Hertz and his wife Laura Doss-Hertz have partnered with the GO Campaign to fund sustainable water projects worldwide. Hertz is a board member of Heal the Bay, an environmental advocacy group based in Santa Monica, California. Hertz was featured on Apple TV+'s Home (2020 TV series) Episode 8. Home guides the audience inside the world's most extraordinary homes and unveils the boundary-pushing imagination of the visionaries who dared to dream and build them. In 2022, Hertz launched Resilience Fund for Advancing Climate Technologies. Hertz is the winner of 2022 Cooper Hewitt, Smithsonian Design Museum National Design Award for Climate Action. Hertz is a Class 1 Wildland Firefighter and a member of Los Angeles County Fire Brigade.

== Notable projects ==
Hertz's home residence in Venice was built in two phases and completed in 2003. It consists of four structures connected by enclosed bridges, inspired by Balinese architecture. Hertz designed the building as a testbed for many environmentally conscious building ideas. The house has rooftop solar heating panels for water, radiant heating, sustainable woods used throughout, and extensive use of his custom concrete, Syndecrete. Additionally, Hertz designed the large Syndecrete walls to work as a solar sink, absorbing the sun's heat during the day and slowly releasing it at night. The house has been featured in multiple commercials and TV shows, most prominently in the Californication (TV series).

In 2010 Hertz completed the renovation of an existing 45,000 square foot concrete warehouse for Mullin Automotive Museum in Oxnard, California. The museum holds a personal car collection of philanthropist Peter W. Mullin. Hertz added daylight and natural ventilation monitors, a solar photovoltaic roof, a green roof with a new elevator penthouse, and wind turbines to make the building more sustainable. Other additions included new and vintage Art Deco elements to keep in tune with the collection of 1920s and 1930s automobiles. 2021 the Mullin Automotive Museum was selected as the Museum of the Year by Octane magazine at the Historic Motoring Awards.

In 2013, Hertz completed his most ambitious and widely recognized project, the 747 Wing House in the Santa Monica Mountains. The house is built from a mothballed Boeing 747-100 airplane. The project was highly complex and required permits from 17 different government agencies and required CH-47 Chinook cargo helicopter to transport plane sections to the remote building site. Using large sections of prefabricated material, Hertz reduced the greenhouse emissions that bringing raw materials and removing waste material would have caused. The 747 Wing House has been featured in multiple magazine articles since its building process, and many fashion and editorial shoots have taken place there. The Netflix show The World's Most Extraordinary Homes featured the 747 Wing House on its pilot episode. The 747 Wing House was named as one of the world's most beautiful buildings.

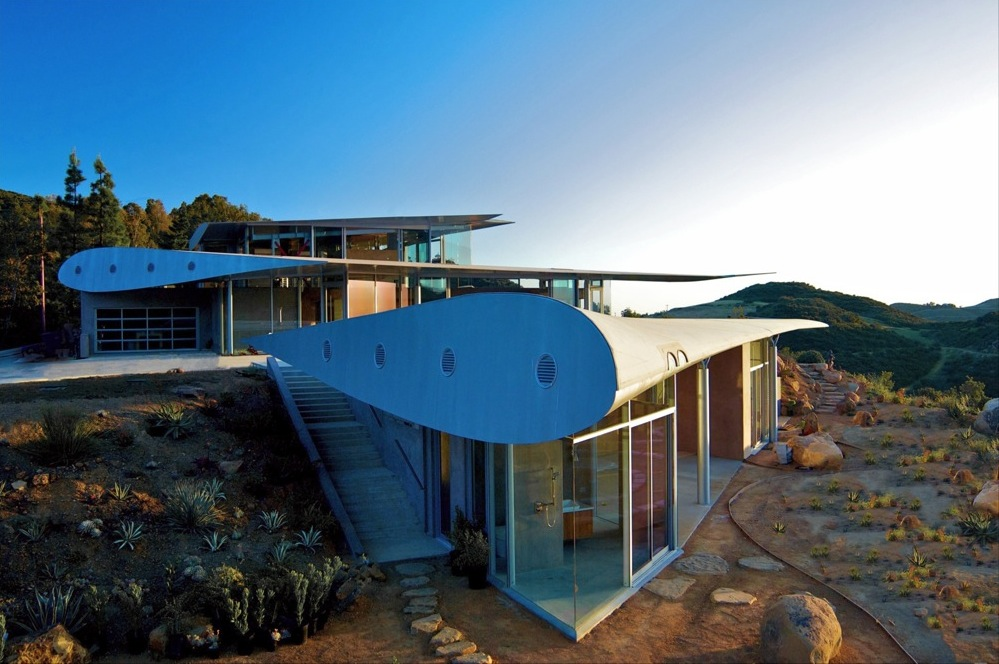

Another example of Hertz's creative use of unusual building materials is the "Panel House", in Venice Beach, California. The building's skin is made of prefabricated refrigeration panels, with a 6-inch thick foam core skinned with thin aluminum. Each panel is 30 inches wide x 30 feet tall and light enough for two people to install each one. The dull aluminum finish subtly changes with the colors of the sky. The house was constructed like a miniature skyscraper, utilizing a heavy metal frame in a poured-concrete base, making weight-bearing walls unnecessary. Large, automated windows provide ocean views from almost anywhere in the house. In 2009, the Panel House earned the Chicago Athenaeum Museum of Architecture and Design's American Architecture Award.

In 2018, a team led by Hertz won the Water Abundance XPRIZE competition with WEDEW, by achieving the goal of producing at least 2,000 liters of water in a single day for no more than two cents per liter. In 2020, Time magazine selected WEDEW as one of the 100 Best Inventions of 2020. In 2022, Hertz received the Cooper Hewitt, Smithsonian Design Museum National Design Award for Climate Action.

In 2021 Hertz completed the Sail House in Bequia, a small island in Saint Vincent and the Grenadines. The Sail House is a dappled array of structures, consisting of a primary residence and several guesthouses. The house has multiple sustainable features, including stormwater collection, reclaimed wood, passive ventilation, and photovoltaic panels. The prefabricated house pays homage to local maritime traditions and employs sustainability as its core concept. The Sail House was selected as the 2021 Jury Winner in Architizer A+Award, in Private House (XL >6000 sq ft category.

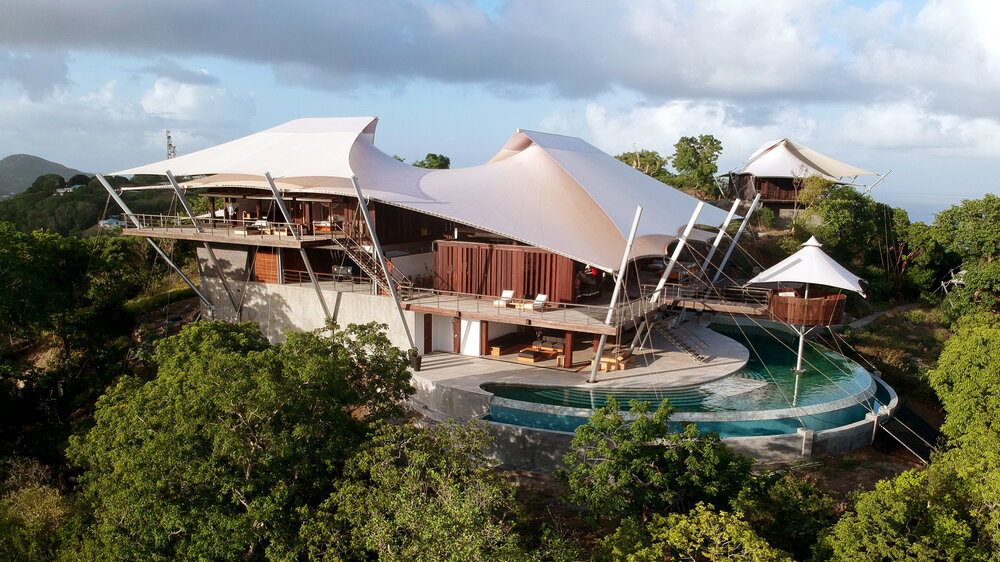

== Projects ==
- Red Rock Canyon House, Red Rock Canyon, NV - 1983
- Venable Studio, Venice, CA - 1989
- Stradella Road House, Bel Air, CA - 1994
- Californication House, Venice, CA - 1995
- Residence on Cold Creek, Malibu, CA - 1995
- Bay Residence, Brentwood, CA - 1997
- Tilt Up Slab House, Venice, CA - 1999
- Floating House, Venice, CA - 2000
- House on Horizon Hill, Yachats, OR - 2001
- Le Brun Residence, Mar Vista, CA - 2003
- Panel House, Venice CA - 2003
- Dreyfus/Hall Residence, Montecito CA - 2004
- Split House, Venice, CA - 2005
- Slat House, Marina Del Rey, CA - 2005
- Mesa Road House, Santa Monica, CA - 2006
- Beverly Grove, Beverly Hills, CA - 2006
- Californication House Phase II, Venice, CA - 2006
- Lee Residence, Pasadena, CA - 2006
- East Canal House, Venice, CA - 2007
- Boone Residence, Venice, CA - 2008
- Strand Residence, Manhattan Beach, CA - 2008
- Adelaide Residence, Santa Monica, CA - 2011
- Yale House, Santa Monica, CA - 2011
- Hermosa House, Hermosa Beach, CA - 2011
- Navy and Pacific House, Venice CA, 2012
- Linda Rosa Residence, La Jolla, CA - 2012
- 747 Wing House, Malibu, CA - 2013
- Butterfly House, Venice, CA - 2013
- Felix Trattoria, Venice, CA - 2016
- Westage Residence, Brentwood, CA - 2019
- Avocado Bungalow, Venice, CA - 2019
- Hollywood Bowl House, Venice, CA 2019
- Sail House, Bequia, Saint Vincent and the Grenadines 2021
- NRDC Natural Resources Defense Council Santa Monica, 2021

== Awards ==
=== 2022 ===
- Cooper Hewitt, Smithsonian Design Museum National Design Award for Climate Action
- Honor Award, Large Single Family Residential at AIALA Residential Architecture Award
- Finalist Architizer A+Award, Best Sustainable Firm

=== 2021 ===
- Jury Winner Architizer A+Award, Private House (XL >6000 sq ft)

=== 2020 ===
- Time magazine's 100 Best Inventions of 2020

=== 2018 ===
- Water Abundance XPRIZE Grand Prize Winner

=== 2015 ===
- Best of the Westside: Best Architecture Firm, awarded by The Argonaut magazine

=== 2014 ===
- AIA Los Angeles Monograph Tour of Venice Beach Residences

=== 2012 ===
- The Chicago Athenaeum American Architecture Award 2012 for the 747 Wing House
- AIA California Council Residential Design Awards 2012 for 747 Wing House
- The International Design Awards 2012 Gold for 747 Wing House

=== 2010 ===
- Selected for inclusion in :California Design Biennial. PMCA Pasadena Museum of Contemporary Art Action / Reaction

=== 2008 ===
- Elected to the College of Fellows of the American Institute of Architects

=== 2007 ===
- SCI ARC distinguished Alumni Award

=== 1996 ===
- Museum of Modern Art in New York: Syndecrete included in Permanent Collection
