= Kiss Me Kate (TV series) =

- Directed by: John Stroud; Nick Wood
- Starring: Caroline Quentin; Chris Langham; Amanda Holden; Darren Boyd
- Theme music composer: Philip Pope
- Country of origin: United Kingdom
- Original language: English
- No. of series: 3
- No. of episodes: 20

Production
- Executive producers: John Bishop; Geoffrey Perkins
- Producer: Nick Symons
- Running time: 30 minutes

Original release
- Network: BBC One
- Release: 4 May 1998 – 26 December 2000

Kiss Me Kate is a British sitcom that ran from 4 May 1998 until 26 December 2000. It followed the everyday life of a counsellor, Kate (Caroline Quentin), who not only must manage her clients' problems, but also must help her neighbours and unsuccessful business partner, Douglas, played by Chris Langham. Amanda Holden played Mel, the receptionist. Darren Boyd played the sweet, but foolish, Craig, the travel agent downstairs.

During the series, both Craig and Douglas fall for Kate. Mel and Craig become romantically involved, but Douglas continues to be in love with Kate. Kate then falls for Douglas's brother, Iain Cameron (Bill Nighy), a successful cardiac surgeon.

It was written by Chris Langham and John Morton, who had collaborated on People Like Us.

== Cast ==
=== Main ===
- Caroline Quentin, Kate Salinger
- Chris Langham, Douglas Fielding/Cameron
- Amanda Holden, Mel
- Darren Boyd, Craig Chapman

=== Recurring ===
- Cliff Parisi, Tony (Series 1 and 2 only)
- Mark Heap, Peter (Series 1 only)
- Holly Atkins, Alex (Series 2 only)
- Alex Leam, Holly (Series 2 only)
- Elizabeth Renihan, Jo (Series 3 only)
- Bill Nighy, Douglas' brother, Iain Cameron

== Series overview ==
Series	Episodes	Originally released	
Series	Episodes	First released	Last released
1	6	4 March 1998	8 June 1998
2	6	13 May 1999	15 June 1999
3	8	18 November 2000	26 December 2000

=== Series 1 (1998) ===
No.	Title	Original release date
1	"Secretaries"	4 May 1998
2	"Mike"	11 May 1998
3	"Calendar"	18 May 1998
4	"Speech"	25 May 1998
5	"Holidays"	1 June 1998
6	"Reunion"	8 June 1998

=== Series 2 (1999) ===
No.	Title	Original release date
7	"Closure"	13 May 1999
8	"Dad"	20 May 1999
9	"Money Matters"	27 May 1999
10	"One Night Stand"	3 June 1999
11	"Teeth"	8 June 1999
12	"On the Couch"	15 June 1999

=== Series 3 (2000) ===
No.	Title	Original release date
13	"The Italian Job"	18 November 2000
14	"Magnolia"	25 November 2000
15	"The Bahamas"	2 December 2000
16	"Oh Brother!"	9 December 2000
17	"Grandfather Clock"	16 December 2000
18	"The Party"	17 December 2000
19	"Kate's Niece"	23 December 2000
20	"Christmas"	26 December 2000

=== Comic Relief Sketch ===
No.	Title	Original release date
N–A	"Comic Relief sketch"	16 March 2001

== Filming locations ==
Filming took place at the now closed Carlton Television Studios in Nottingham in front of a live studio audience. At the beginning of each series the crew spent four days filming all exterior scenes at various locations in and around Nottingham.

The main building that housed the office and Kate's flat is situated on East Circus Street, Nottingham, directly opposite the Nottingham Playhouse.

The building used in the third series as the exterior of "Cafe Coffee" is in reality a casino located at the junction of St. Peters Gate and Bridlesmith Gate, Nottingham.

The building used as the location of Iain's flat is situated on Broadway in the Lace Market area of Nottingham.

Other locations used throughout the series include the University of Nottingham, the Peacock Inn at Redmile, Leicestershire and Nottingham's Victoria Embankment.
