= Caroline Quentin =

English actress and presenter (born 1960)

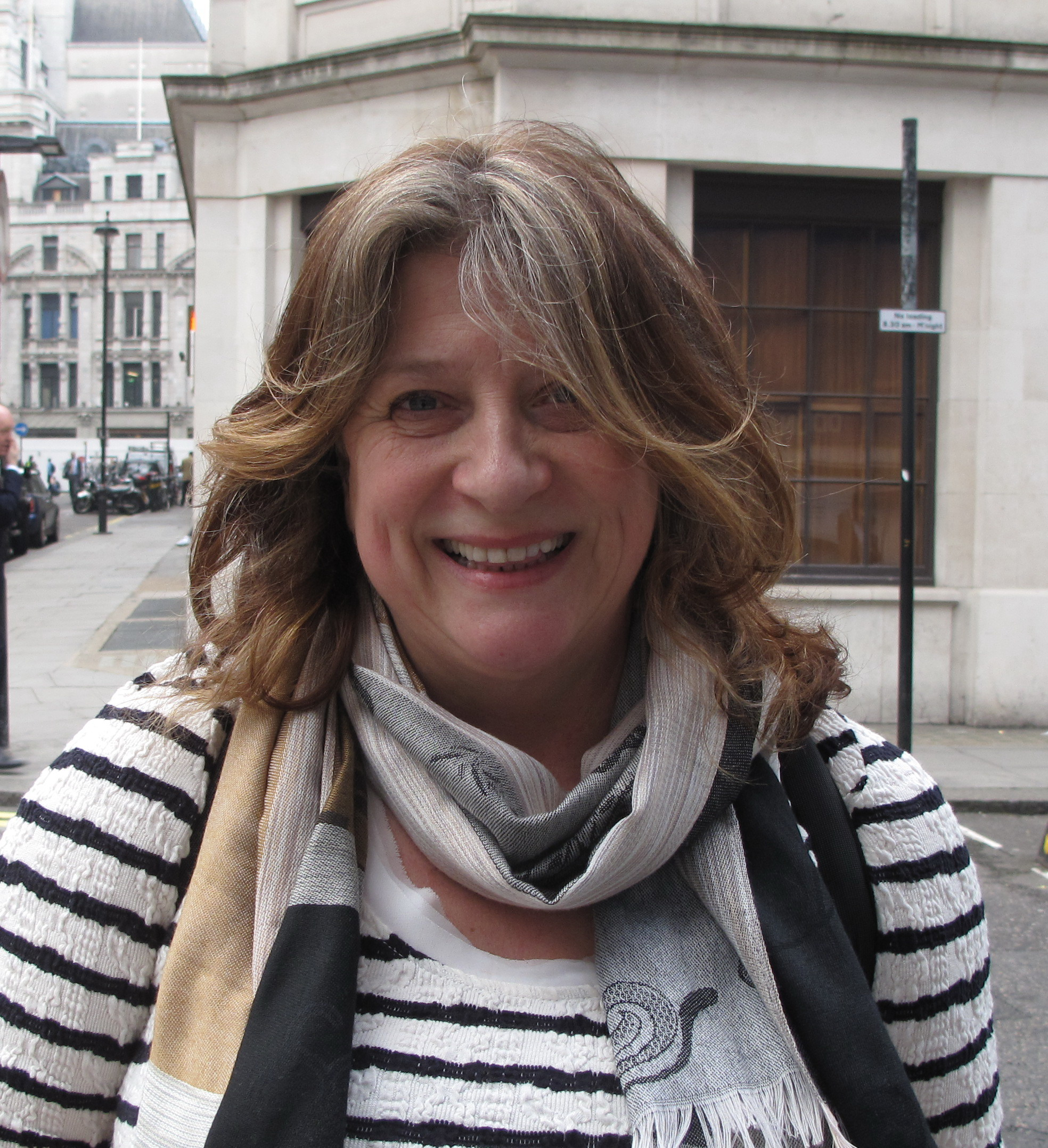
- Quentin in 2011
- Born: Caroline Amanda Jane Jones; 11 July 1960 (age 66); Reigate, Surrey, England
- Occupations: Actress; presenter; broadcaster; author
- Years active: 1980–present
- Spouses: Paul Merton (m. 1990; div. 1998) Sam Farmer (m. 2006)
- Children: 2

Caroline Quentin (born Caroline Amanda Jane Jones; 11 July 1960) is an English actress, broadcaster and television presenter. Quentin became known for her television appearances, portraying Dorothy in Men Behaving Badly (1992–1998), Maddie Magellan in Jonathan Creek (1997–2000), Kate Salinger in Kiss Me Kate (1998–2000) and DCI Janine Lewis in Blue Murder (2003–2009).

== Early life ==
Quentin was born in Reigate, Surrey, to Kathleen Jones and her husband Fred, a Royal Air Force pilot. She has three older sisters. She was educated at the independent Arts Educational School, in Tring, Hertfordshire, and appeared locally in the Pendley Open Air Shakespeare Festival.

== Career ==
=== Television ===
One of her earliest roles was in the Channel 4 comedy drama Hollywood Hits Chiswick, alongside Derek Newark as W.C. Fields.

Between 1992 and 1998, Quentin appeared as Dorothy in all 42 episodes of the sitcom Men Behaving Badly. From 1997 until 2000, Quentin starred alongside Alan Davies in Jonathan Creek playing investigative journalist Maddie Magellan, who uses Jonathan's mind to solve murder mysteries. In 1998 she starred in the first sitcom that was specifically built around her: Kiss Me Kate; that year she started the major role of Maggie Mee in the drama Life Begins, which returned for a third series in 2006. Quentin appeared in the television film Hot Money (2001), which was based on the true story of the theft of hundreds of thousands of pounds from the Bank of England.

ITV has produced five series of the police drama Blue Murder, in which Quentin plays against type in the main role DCI Janine Lewis. The pilot aired in the UK on 18 May 2003.

Quentin has appeared in Whose Line Is It Anyway?; in a pre-Men Behaving Badly role as a traffic warden in the Mr. Bean episode "The Trouble with Mr. Bean" in 1991; Room 101; Have I Got News for You; and the 2009–10 BBC comedy series Life of Riley, a sitcom about a dysfunctional blended family; and in the BBC Radio 4 improvisational comedy series The Masterson Inheritance, the Radio 4 comedy Any Bloke (starred with Jim Sweeney who was also in The Masterson Inheritance) and the popular BBC Radio 2 sitcom On the Blog. She appeared as Heather Babcock in an episode of Agatha Christie's Miss Marple, The Mirror Crack'd from Side to Side, in 2010. Also in 2010 she started appearing in Marks & Spencer's revamped food range advertisements.

In March 2011, a documentary entitled Caroline Quentin: A Passage Through India aired on ITV in the UK. The documentary followed Quentin as she traveled from the North of India to the South. Quentin presented Restoration Home on BBC Two. The programme looks into the history and families of the UK's derelict mansion houses which are being restored by their private owners. In 2012, Quentin began working on another documentary series, Cornwall with Caroline Quentin, which shows her travelling across Cornwall, for which she received some criticism due to apparently aiming the show at potential second home owners. She returned to present a second series of the show in 2013. In 2013, she hosted another documentary series, Caroline Quentin's National Parks for one series. Quentin starred in the Comedy Central series Big Bad World where she played the role of Jan, the mother of the main character Ben (Blake Harrison).

In 2015, she played the role of veterinary surgeon Angela Sim in an episode of Doc Martin, re-uniting with her Men Behaving Badly co-star Martin Clunes, and returned in 2017 and 2019. She played the role of Mrs Bumble in Dickensian (2015–2016). In November 2016, she guest presented an episode of The One Show.

Starting in 2017, Quentin was co-presenter of the BBC Two programme The World's Most Extraordinary Homes with architect Piers Taylor; 12 episodes were completed and aired. Subsequently, the series streamed on Netflix.

In 2020, Quentin participated in the eighteenth series of Strictly Come Dancing. She was partnered with Johannes Radebe. Quentin became the fourth celebrity to be voted off on 22 November 2020. Quentin later commented, "I have had the honour and privilege of working with some of the greatest dancers this country has ever known. I mean I really believe it, I think they are absolutely fantastic."

In May 2023 Quentin was featured in the BBC coverage of the Chelsea Flower Show, showing viewers around the garden of her home near Tiverton, Devon.

=== Theatre ===
Her early stage work had also included appearing in the chorus of the original English production of the musical Les Misérables in 1985.

In 2019 she played Lady Fancyfull in the Royal Shakespeare Company production of The Provoked Wife. In 2022 she played Mrs Malaprop in the Royal National Theatre's production of Jack Absolute Flies Again, earning her a Laurence Olivier nomination for Best Actress in a Supporting Role.

In 2023 she played elder Emma Hamilton and Mrs Cadogan in Jermyn Street Theatre's world premier production of Infamous by April de Angelis.

=== Music ===
In July 1996, Quentin released a single, a cover of the Exciters' hit "Tell Him", with her Men Behaving Badly co-star Leslie Ash under the name of "Quentin and Ash". The single spent three weeks in the UK Singles Chart, reaching number 25.

=== Recognition ===
Quentin received an Ian Charleson Award commendation for her Masha in The Seagull at the Oxford Theatre Company in 1991.

At the British Comedy Awards in 2004, Quentin won the "Best Comedy Actress" award for her performance in Von Trapped.

=== Book ===
In 2023, it was announced that Quentin had written a gardening book, titled Drawn to the Garden, about her own experience in running a vegetable and flower garden at her home on Devon, which she began sharing on Instagram during the COVID-19 lockdown. Included throughout the book are various watercolours and sketches by Quentin. Its release was planned for 15 February 2024.

== Personal life ==
Quentin was married to comedian Paul Merton from 1990 until their 1998 divorce. Quentin met Sam Farmer in 1998 on the set of Men Behaving Badly, where he was a runner. The couple have two children. Her daughter Rose is also an actress, and has appeared alongside her mother. In 2006, she married Farmer in Tiverton, Devon. They lived briefly in Morebath Manor near the village of Morebath, Devon, close to Tiverton, before moving to a smaller derelict farm nearby, which they renovated. Before moving to Devon, the couple lived at Walberswick, Suffolk.

Quentin has coeliac disease and is the patron of Coeliac UK. She is also president of the charity Campaign for National Parks.

== Filmography ==
Key
†	Denotes films that have not yet been released

=== Film ===
Year	Title	Role	Notes
1983	Party Party	Shirley	
1987	Billy the Kid and the Green Baize Vampire		
2001	Hot Money		
2010	Race for Life: Girls Just Want to Have Fun		Short film
2014	Love Me Tender	Woman	Short film
2021	Tiny Cow	April	Short film
2021	Father Christmas Is Back	Elizabeth Christmas	
2021	Miss Willoughby and the Haunted Bookshop	Sarah Clarkson	
2022	A Week in Paradise	Helen	
2022	Jack Absolute Flies Again	Mrs. Malaprop	National Theatre Live
2022	Christmas in the Caribbean	Amanda	

=== Television ===
Year	Title	Role	Notes
1980	The Squad	Vicky Banks	Episode: "Recruits"
1983	Video Stars	Fritzie Lang	Television film
1984	Dream Stuffing	Brenda	3 episodes
1984	Play for Today	Receptionist	Episode: "The Groundling and the Kite"
1987	Up Line	Patti Technology	Four-part series
1988	This Is David Lander	Tricia Worthington	Episode: "Not a Pretty Site"
1989	Shadow of the Noose	Mary Bennett	Television mini-series episode: "Beside the Seaside"
1989	Casualty	Jane Locke	Episode: "Banking for Beginners"
1990	Hale and Pace		Series 3, episode 1
1990	Harry Enfield's Television Programme	Various characters	4 episodes
1991	Josie		Series 1, episode 3
1991	The Bill	Ruth Otley	Episode: "Breakout"
1991–1993	Paul Merton: The Series	Dr. Gillespie/Frank's Wife	3 episodes
1992	Mr. Bean	Traffic Warden	Episode: "The Trouble with Mr. Bean"
1992	Don't Tell Father	Kate Bancroft	6 episodes
1992–1998	Men Behaving Badly	Dorothy	42 episodes — British Comedy Award for Top TV Comedy Actress — Nominated: British Comedy Award for Best TV Comedy Actress
1993	All or Nothing at All	Rebecca	Television mini-series episode 3
1993–94	Have I Got News for You	Panellist	2 episodes
1994	An Evening with Gary Lineker	Monica Despacos	Television film
1994	Entertainment Cops	Miss Pennyfarthing	Television film
1995	Jeremy Hardy Gives Good Sex		Short film
1995–1996	Whose Line Is It Anyway? (UK)	Herself	Series 7 episodes 1, 4, 9, 11, 12 and Series 8 episodes 3, 4, 6
1996	Paul Merton in Galton and Simpson's...	Caroline	Episode: "The Missing Page"
1996	ITV Chart Show	Interviewee	1 episode
1997–2000	Jonathan Creek	Maddy Magellan	18 episodes
1998–2001	Kiss Me Kate	Kate Salinger	22 episodes — Nominated: National Television Award for Most Popular Comedy Performer (1998)
1999	Hooves of Fire	Vixen	Voice, Television short
1999	The Nearly Complete and Utter History of Everything	Marcia Bournemouth	Television film
2001	The Innocent	Beth Pastorov	Two-part series
2001	Goodbye Mr. Steadman	Gina Ravelli	Television film
2001	Hot Money	Bridget Watmore	Television film
2002	Blood Strangers	Lin Beresford	Television film
2002–2003	Living Famously	Narrator	9 episodes; voice
2003–2009	Blue Murder	DCI Janine Lewis	19 episodes — Nominated: National Television Award for Most Popular Actress (2005)
2004	Von Trapped	Maria Moogan	Television film — British Comedy Award for Best TV Comedy Actress
2004–2006	Life Begins	Maggie Mee	Leading role — British Comedy Award for Best TV Comedy Actress (2004) — Golden Nymph Award for Outstanding Actress in a Drama Series (2005) — Nominated: National Television Award for Most Popular Actress (2004, 2005) — Nominated: TV Quick Award for Best Actress (2005)
2005	Footprints in the Snow	Julie Hill	Television film
2009–2011	Life of Riley	Maddy Riley	Main role; 20 episodes
2010	Agatha Christie's Marple: The Mirror Crack'd from Side to Side	Heather Badcock	Television film
2010	Just William	Mrs. Bott	2 episodes
2012–2013	Cornwall with Caroline Quentin	Presenter	2 series (18 episodes)
2012	In Love with Wilde	Duchess of Berwick	
2012	Dead Boss	Virna	Series 1, episode 5
2012	Switch	Gloria	Series 1, Episodes 1 and 6
2013	Dancing on the Edge	Deirdre	5 episodes
2013	Caroline Quentin's National Parks	Presenter	1 series
2013	Big Bad World	Jan	
2015, 2017, 2019	Doc Martin	Angela Sim	Guest role; 4 episodes
2015–2016	Dickensian	Mrs Bumble	1 series
2016	Wild Animal Reunions	Narrator	1 series
2016	The One Show	Guest presenter	1 episode
2017–2022	The Other One	Auntie Dawn	4 episodes
2017–present	The World's Most Extraordinary Homes	Co-presenter	12 episodes
2018	Walks with My Dog	Co-presenter	1 episode
2018	The World's Ugliest Pets	Presenter	1 episode
2020	Strictly Come Dancing	Herself	Contestant; series 18; Eliminated 4th
2020	Bridgerton	Lady Berbrooke	1 episode
2021	Midsomer Murders	Helen Welles	Episode: "Happy Families"
2021–present	Derelict Rescue	Narrator	
2022–2023	The Lazarus Project	Wes	11 episodes
2025	Beyond Paradise	Lotty Robson	Series 3 episode 5
TBA	The UK's National Parks with Caroline Quentin †	Presenter	Filming

=== Theatre ===
Year	Title	Role	Director	Venue	Notes	Ref.
1985	Les Misérables	Blind Beggar / Woman Worker / Whore	John Caird & Trevor Nunn	Palace Theatre, London	Press night	
1985–1986	Les Misérables	Blind Beggar / Woman Worker / Whore	John Caird & Trevor Nunn	Barbican Theatre	Original cast	
1987	The Colombian Cousin		Tim Whitby	Gilded Balloon, Teviot Row, Edinburgh		
1988	Merrily We Roll Along	Ensemble	Julia McKenzie	Shaftesbury Theatre	A part of "Sunday with Sondheim" gala	
1988–1989	Roots	Jenny Beales	Simon Curtis	Royal National Theatre		
1989–1990	Our Country's Good	2nd Lt. William Faddy	Max Stafford-Clark	Garrick Theatre		
1989–1990	Faith, Hope and Charity		Heribert Sasse	Lyric Theatre (Hammersmith)		
1990–1991	The Seagull		Mike Alfreds	Lilian Baylis Theatre		
1991	An Evening with Gary Lineker	Monica	Audrey Cooke	Duchess Theatre		
1993	The Game of Love and Chance	The Maid	Mike Alfreds & Neil Barlett	Royal Naitional Theatre		
1994	Mirandolina	Mirandolina	Dalia Ibelhauptaite	Lyric Theatre (Hammersmith)		
1995	Live Bed Show	Maria	Audrey Cooke	Garrick Theatre		
1998	The London Cuckolds	Ensemble	Terry Johnson	Lyttelton Theatre		
2007	Life After Scandal	Christine Hamilton	Anthony Clark	Hampstead Theatre	Original cast	
2011	Terrible Advice	Hedda	Frank Oz	Menier Chocolate Factory		
2012	Pippin	Berthe	Mitch Sebastian	Menier Chocolate Factory		
2014	Oh, What a Lovely War	Ensemble	Terry Johnson	Royal Stratford East		
2014	Relative Values	Moxie	Trevor Nunn	Harold Pinter Theatre		
2015	The Life and Times of Fanny Hill	Fanny Hill	April de Angelis	Bristol Old Vic		
2017	The Hypocrite	Lady Sarah Hotham	Phillip Breen	Hull Truck Theatre	Royal Shakespeare Company	
2018	Me and My Girl	Duchess of Dene	Daniel Evans	Chichester Festival Theatre		
2019	The Provoked Wife	Lady Fancyfulll	Phillip Breen	Swan Theatre	Royal Shakespeare Company	
2022	Jack Absolute Flies Again	Mrs Malaprop	Emily Burns	Royal National Theatre		
2022	Mrs. Warren's Profession	Kitty Warren	Anthony Banks	Theatre Royal Bath		
2023	Infamous	Emma Hamilton (1985) / Mrs Cadogan	Michael Oakley	Jermyn Street Theatre	Original cast	
2025	By Royal Appointment	The Dresser	Dominic Dromgoole	Theatre Royal, Bath		
2025	The Seagull	Irina Arkadina	James Brining	Lyceum Theatre, Edinburgh	Mike Poulton's adaptation of the play by Anton Chekhov	

=== Audio drama ===
Year	Title	Role	Notes
2016	Wooden Overcoats	Madame Lansbury Manning	Episode: "The Ghost of Piffling Vale"

== Awards and nominations ==
=== Film and television ===
Year	Award	Category	Work	Result	Ref
1995	British Comedy Awards	Top TV Comedy Actress	Men Behaving Badly	Won	
1997	British Comedy Awards	Best TV Comedy Actress	Men Behaving Badly	Nominated	
1998	National Television Awards	Most Popular Comedy Performer	Kiss Me Kate	Nominated	
2004	British Comedy Awards	Best TV Comedy Actress	Life Begins / Von Trapped	Won	
2004	National Television Awards	Most Popular Actress	Life Begins	Nominated	
2004	National Television Awards	Special Recognition Award		Won	
2005	National Television Awards	Most Popular Actress	Life Begins / Blue Murder	Nominated	
2005	Monte-Carrlo TV Festival	Outstanding Actress - Drama Series	Life Begins	Won	
2005	TV Quick Awards	Best Actress	Life Begins	Nominated	

=== Theatre ===
Year	Award	Category	Work	Result	Ref.
2023	Laurence Olivier Awards	Best Actress in a Supporting Role	Jack Absolute Flies Again	Nominated	

=== Audio ===
Year	Award	Category	Work	Result	Ref.
2012	Specsavers National Book Awards	Audiobook of the Year	The Woman Who Went to Bed for a Year by Sue Townsend	Won	

== Books ==
- 2024 Drawn to the Garden (Frances Lincoln) ISBN 9780711290556
- 2026 Drawn to Nature (Frances Lincoln) ISBN 9781805701347

== See also ==
- List of people diagnosed with coeliac disease
