= The World's Most Extraordinary Homes =

- Genre: Documentary
- Presented by: Piers Taylor; Caroline Quentin
- Country of origin: United Kingdom
- Original language: English
- No. of seasons: 2
- No. of episodes: 12

Production
- Camera setup: Single-camera
- Running time: 60 minutes
- Production company: Wall to Wall Media

Original release
- Network: BBC Two
- Release: 6 January 2017 – present

The World's Most Extraordinary Homes is a British documentary miniseries presented by Piers Taylor and Caroline Quentin and is broadcast on BBC Two. The series was also picked up by Netflix between March 2018 and July 2022.

== Synopsis ==
The documentary miniseries follows award-winning architect Piers Taylor and actress and property developer Caroline Quentin, who explore a range of architect-designed houses in both extreme locations around the world, and around various countries.

The first series focused on houses built in challenging surroundings, and how they were designed to respond to these environments. The second series focused on one country per episode, and traveled to different destinations in each nation.

Each episode is themed and named according to the houses' environments or location. To explore how the designs function both as works of architecture and as real houses, the hosts stay overnight, eat meals and spend time in the homes.

== Cast ==
- Piers Taylor
- Caroline Quentin

== Episodes ==
=== Season one ===
No. overall	No. in season	Title	Directed by	Original release date	UK viewers (millions)
1	1	"Mountain"	Ed St Giles	6 January 2017	2.25
747 Wing House by David Hertz Architects in Malibu, California; Tucson Mountain Retreat by DUST Architects in Tucson, Arizona; Te Kaitaka by Stevens Lawson Architects in New Zealand; House on the Rigi by AFGH Architects in Scheidegg, Switzerland
2	2	"Forest"	Ed St Giles	13 January 2017	1.71
Casa Levene by No.Mad Architects in Madrid, Spain; Tower House by Gluck+ Architects in the Catskill Mountains, New York; Shokan by Jay Bargmann in Catskill Mountains, New York; Under Pohutukawa by Herbst Architects in New Zealand
3	3	"Coast"	Ed St Giles	20 January 2017	N/A
Cabin Lyngholmen by Lund & Hagem Architects in Nordre Lyngholmen, Lillesand, Norway; House on the Cliff by GilBartolome Architects in Salobreña, Spain; Waterfall Bay House by Bossley Architects in Marlborough Sounds, New Zealand; Two Hulls by MacKay-Lyons Sweetapple Architects in Nova Scotia, Canada
4	4	"Underground"	Ed St Giles	27 January 2017	1.77
Ktima House by Camilo Rebelo and Susana Martins in Antiparos, Greece; Villa Vals by SeARCH and CMA Architects in Vals, Switzerland; Our Place by Ponting Fitzgerald in Queenstown, New Zealand; Dutch Mountain House by Denieuwegeneratie Architects in Huizen, Netherlands

=== Season two ===
No. overall	No. in season	Title	Directed by	Original release date	UK viewers (millions)
5	1	"Portugal"	Mike Ratcliffe & Will Hustler	28 February 2018	2.34
Wall House by Guedes Cruz Architects in Cascais, Portugal; Casa Na Gateira by Camarim Architects in Serra da Estrela, Portugal; Casa Monte by Pereira Miguel Architects in Grândola, Portugal; Casa Gerês by Carvalho Araújo Architects in Peneda-Gerês National Park, Portugal
6	2	"Switzerland"	Emma Webster	7 March 2018	1.23
Maison aux Jeurs by Lacroix Chessex in Trient, Switzerland; House in Brissago by Wespi de Meuron Romeo Architects in Brissago, Switzerland; Flexhouse by Evolution Design in Feldmeilen, Switzerland; Villa am See by Unger & Treina Architects in Weggis, Switzerland
7	3	"Japan"	Emma Webster	14 March 2018	1.31
House in Izura by Kotaro Anzai & Lifestyle Koubou in Kitaibaraki, Ibaraki, Japan; Jikka House by Issei Suma in Itō, Shizuoka, Japan; Optical Glass House by Hiroshi Nakamura & NAP in Hiroshima, Japan; Glass House for a Diver by Tetsuya Nakazono in Etajima, Japan
8	4	"USA"	Will Hustler	3 May 2018	1.12
Canal House by Marcio Kogan & Studio MK27 in Miami, Florida; Brillhart House by Brillhart Architecture in Miami, Florida; Spencer House by Guy Peterson in Sarasota, Florida; Prairie Residence by Rene Gonzalez in Miami, Florida
9	5	"Spain"	Mike Ratcliffe	10 May 2018	1.1
Rural House by RCR Arquitectes in Olot, Spain; Hemeroscopium by Ensamble Studio in Madrid, Spain; Solo House 2 by Office KGDVS in Matarraña, Spain; House of Three Sisters by Blancafort-Reus Architecture in Bullas, Spain
10	6	"India"	Will Hustler	16 May 2018	1.12
The House Cast in Liquid Stone by SPASM Design in Khopoli, India; The House of Three Streams by Malik Architecture in Western Ghats, India; The Riparian House by Architecture Brio in Karjat, India; Collage House by S+PS Architects in Navi Mumbai, India
11	7	"Norway"	Emma Webster	20 June 2018	1.18
Vega Cottage by Kolman Boye Architects in Vega Municipality, Norway; Summer House by Jensen & Skodvin Architects in Sylte in Norddal Municipality, Norway; Concrete House by Carl-Viggo Hølmebakk in Ottestad in Stange Municipality, Norway; Weekend House by Knut Hjeltnes Architects in Fosnavåg in Herøy Municipality, Norway
12	8	"Israel"	Emma Webster	27 June 2018	0.84
J House by Pitsou Kedem Architects in Herzliya Pituah, Israel; Residence in the Galilee by Golany Architects in Sea of Galilee, Israel; Barud House by Paritzki & Liani Architects in Jerusalem, Israel; House with Three Trees by Ron Fleisher & Golan Hadari Architects in Musmus, Israel

== Gallery ==
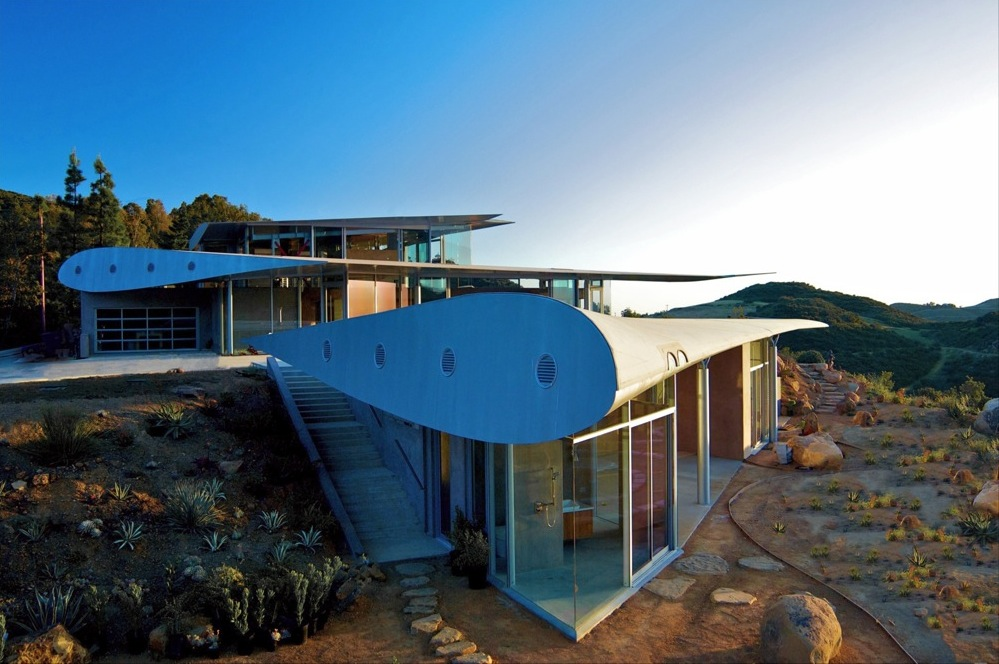
747 Wing House, Malibu, California, U.S.
(Season 1, Episode 1; "Mountain")

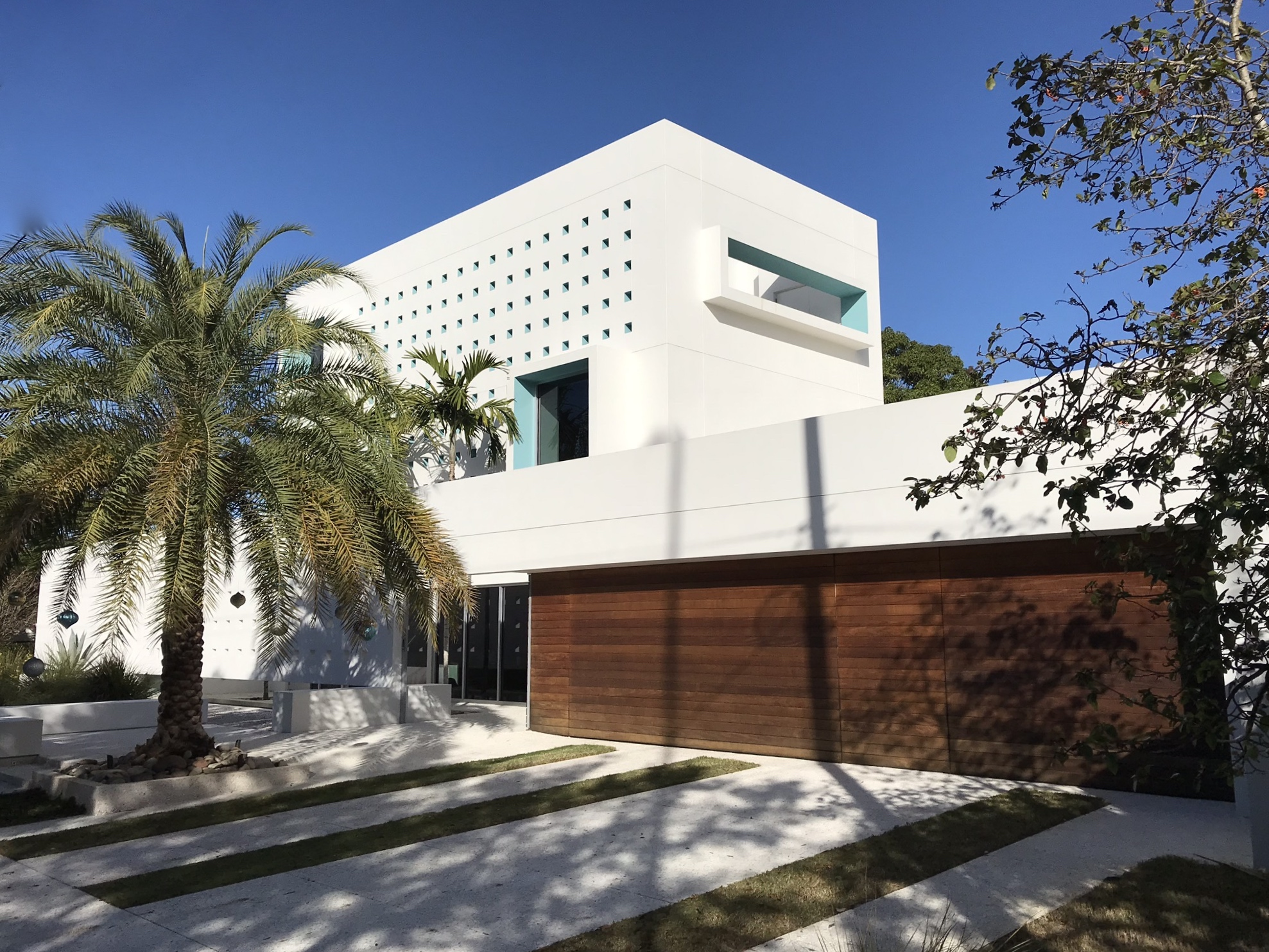
Spencer House, Sarasota, Florida, U.S.
(Season 2, Episode 4; "USA")

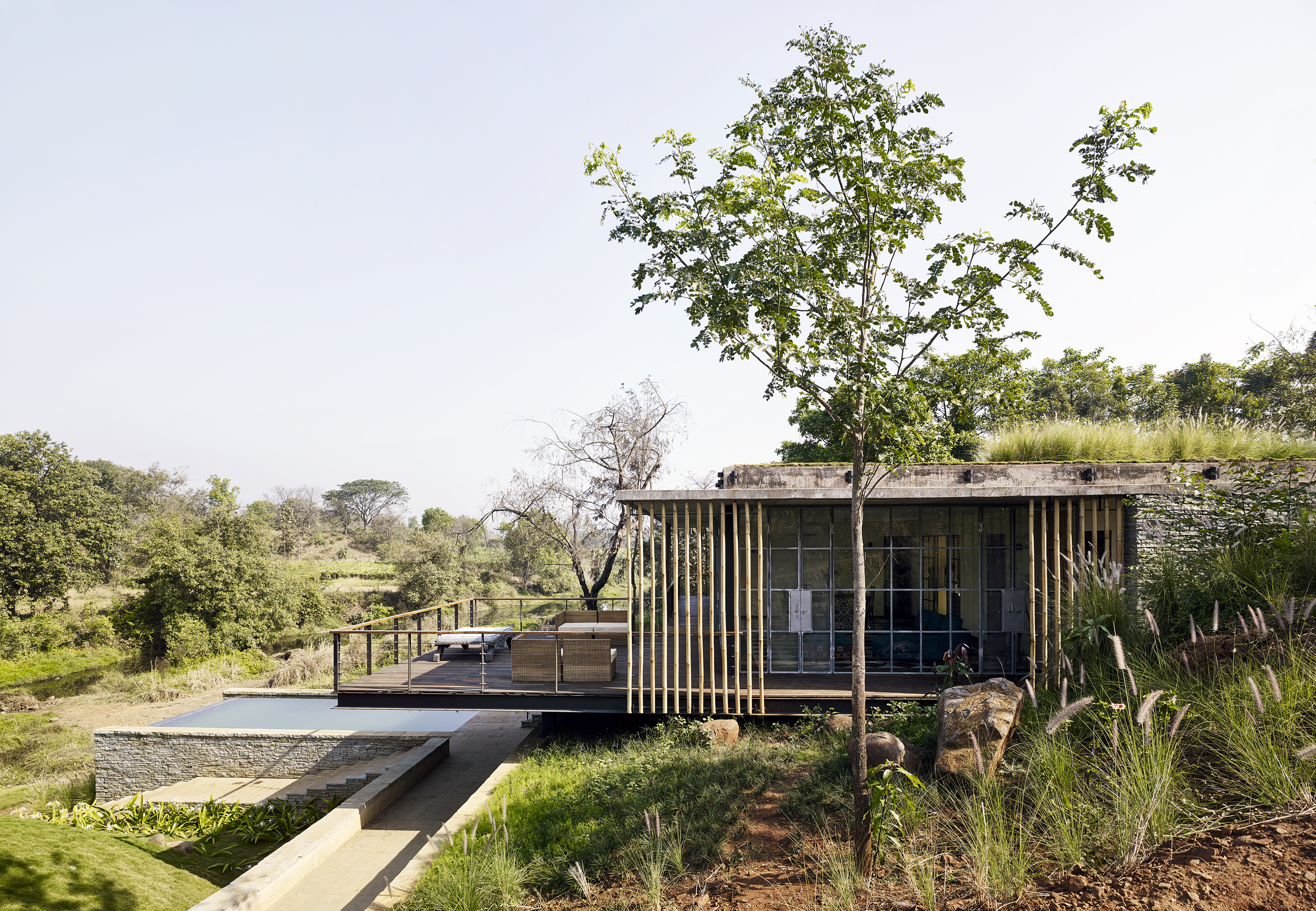
The Riparian House, Karjat, India
(Season 2, Episode 6; "India")
