= 747 Wing House =

Unique residential structure in Ventura County, California

Coordinates: 34°5′34″N 118°58′1″W

The 747 Wing House is a residential structure designed from the wings of a decommissioned TWA Boeing 747-131 (N93106). Located in the Ventura County portion of the Santa Monica Mountains, northwest of the city of Malibu, California, the house has been widely publicized internationally because of its unique design, its sustainable use of recycled materials, the dramatic transportation of the wings to the building site that was completed by a truck and helicopter, and its creative repurposing of abandoned infrastructure to achieve an architectural work of significance. The project was completed by American architect David Randall Hertz, a fellow of the American Institute of Architects, and his firm, the Studio of Environmental Architecture, in 2011. Working with associate Lucas Goettsche, Hertz assembled a team that was able to realize the project after many years of waiting on government approvals.

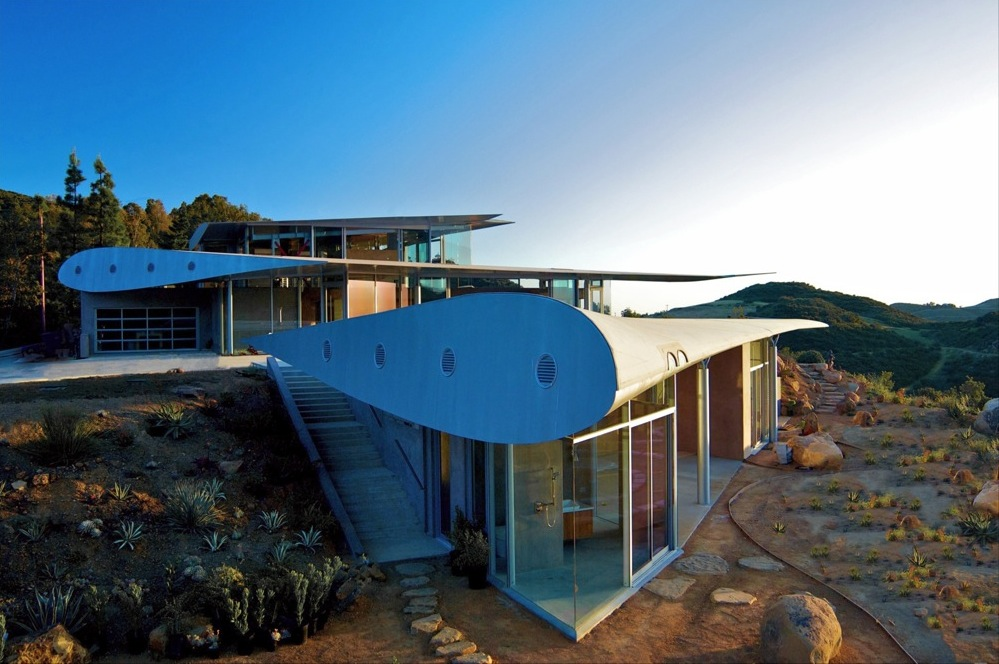
747 Wing House

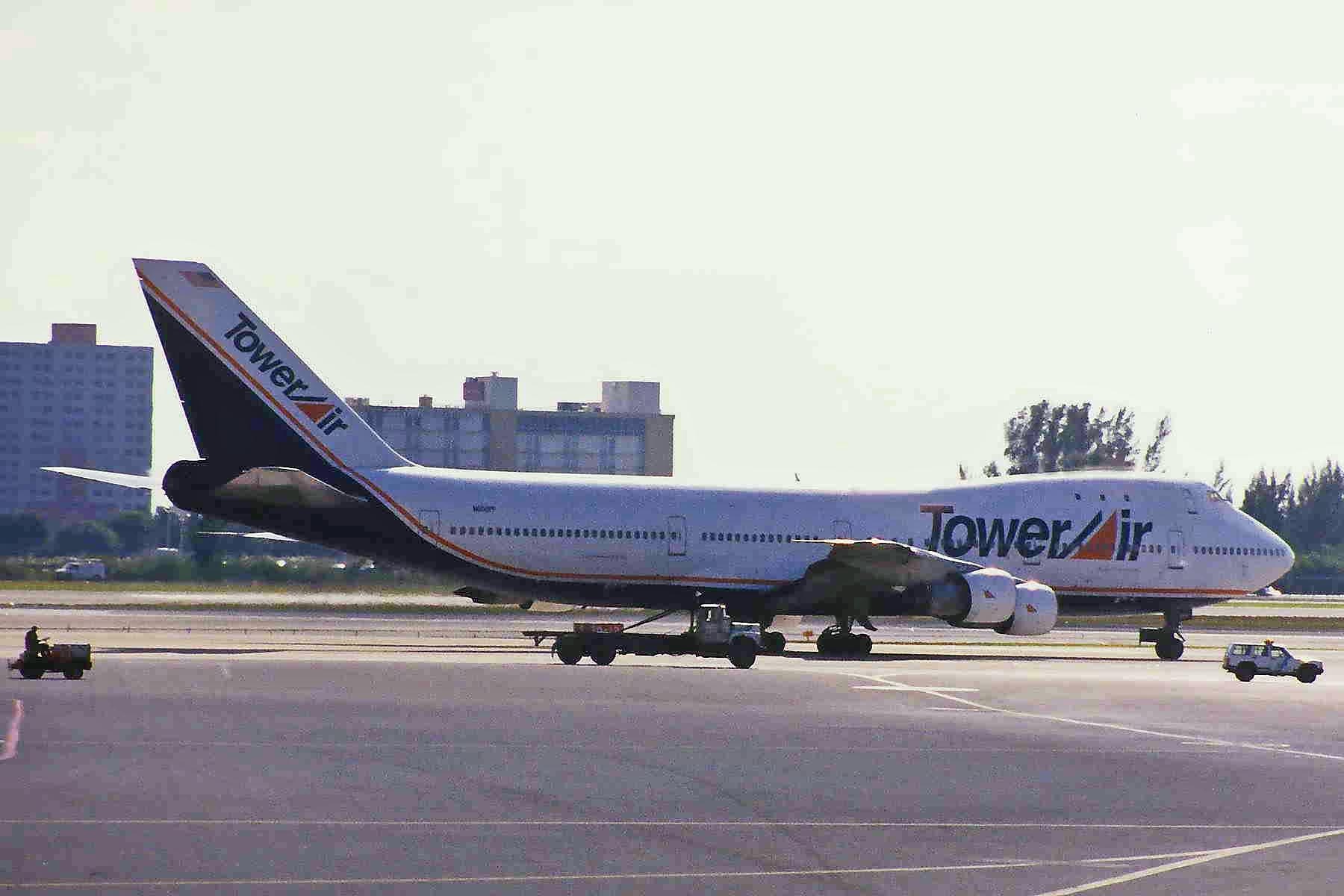
N608FF, the 747-100 that had its wings used for the site.

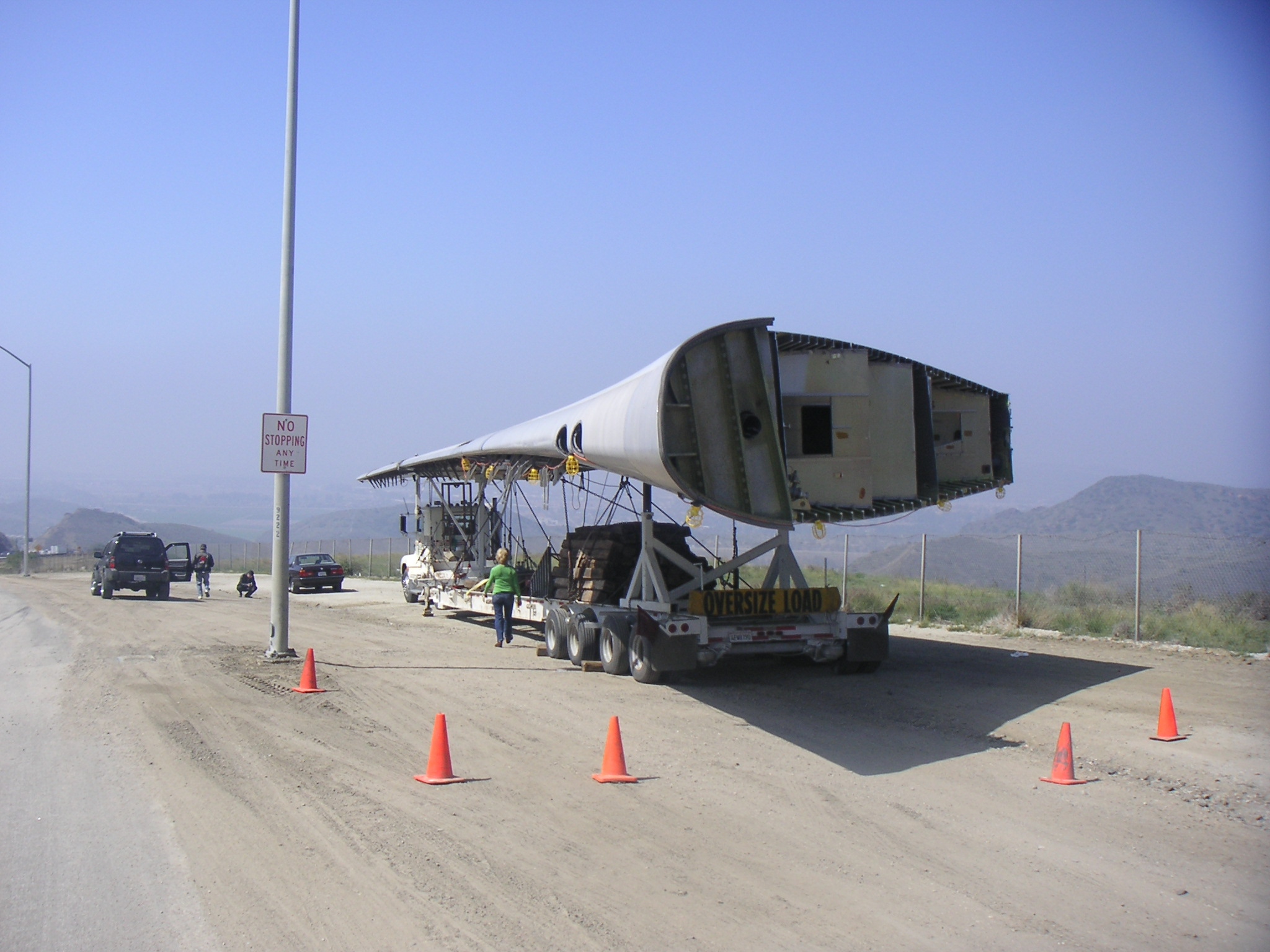
Wing on a semi-trailer

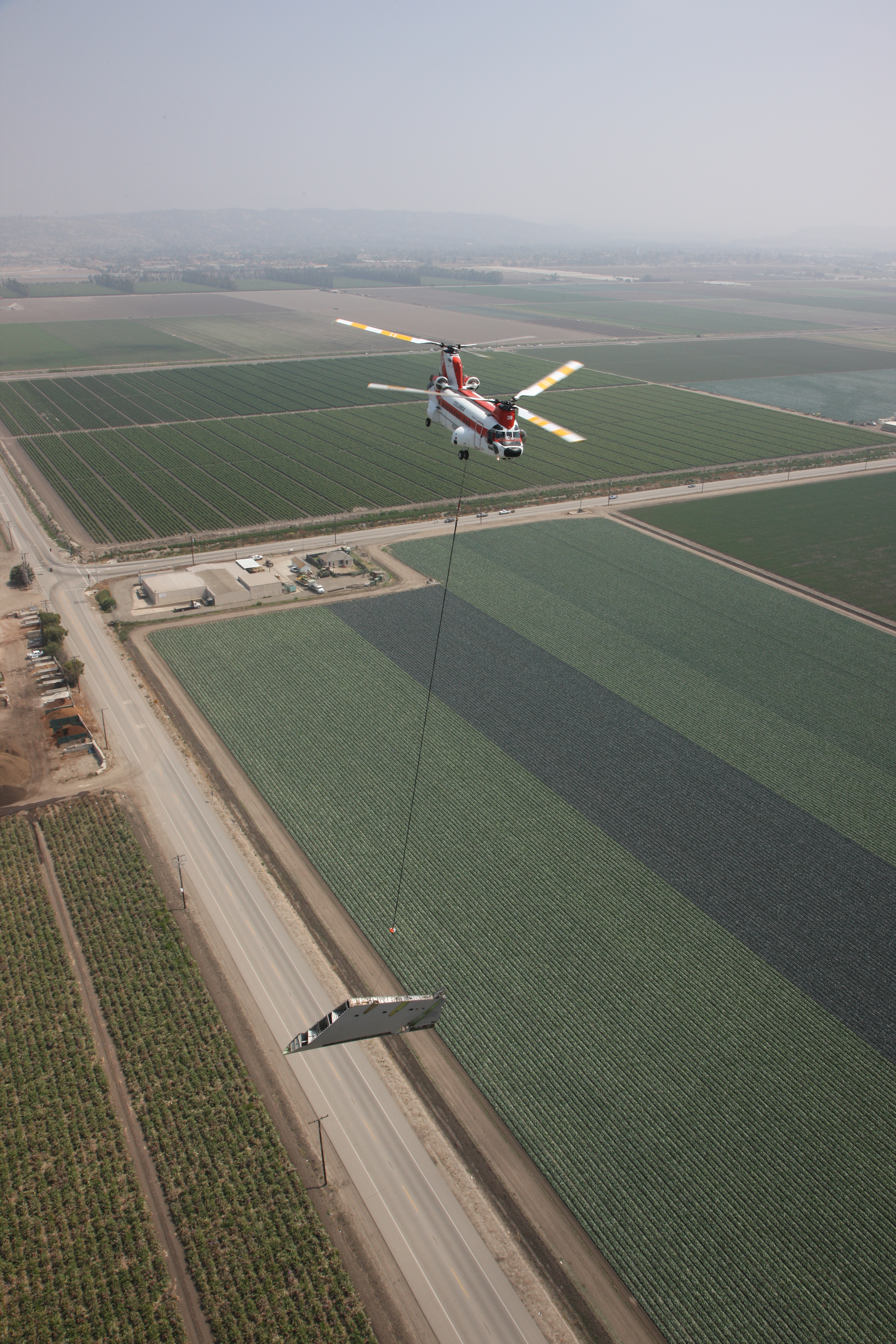
Colombia Helicopters Operated Columbia Model 234 Commercial Chinook carrying wing

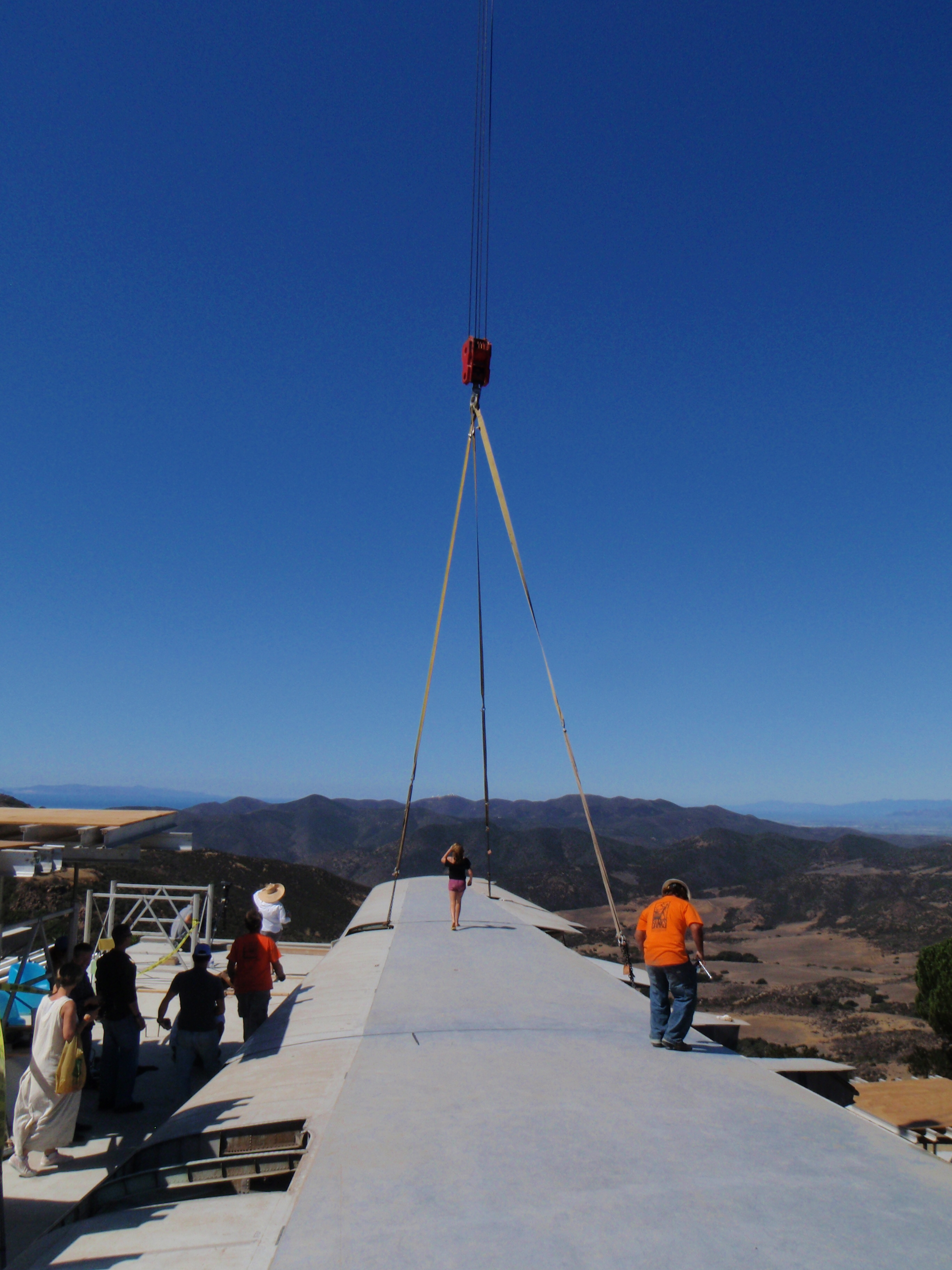
A wing lowered into place

== History ==
=== Site ===
The property was formerly owned and occupied by famous artist and Hollywood set designer Tony Duquette. Duquette's property was burned in the Green Meadow fire of 1993, which resulted in the complete destruction of over twenty-one of the structures that he and his wife had created from recycled objects and movie sets.

=== Concept ===
Whilst flying in the air and pondering the design, Hertz imagined a floating roof that would hang over the site to minimize structural obstructions of the views of a nearby mountain ridge. Hertz's initial concept sketches showed a site section with a curved ceiling and a roof form that reminded him of the wing section of an airplane. The wing, a self-supporting structure, cantilevers off the fuselage of an airplane like an outstretched arm. This requires little vertical support and only a few walls, which is ideal for a structure to minimize obstructions and maximize views. Creating a wing foil shaped roof would be complex and difficult to build conventionally. Through examining and exploring a variety of actual wing dimensions, Hertz determined that the wings from a 747 would fit on the existing pads and that they were already oriented to keep the views. The low profile of the wings was integrated into the ridge top, and the wing made to appear to cascade down and float above the ground. Utilizing the wings as 100% post-consumer recycled components and appropriating them in creative new ways is consistent with the existing context of Duquette's structures of found objects and emblematic of Hertz's thoughts on the "disposable" nature of our society.

=== Design ===
The main house comprises two separate buildings linked together on three levels and uses two wings and two horizontal stabilizers from a Boeing 747-131. The lower house is partially open air and has 18-foot-tall (5.5 m) ceilings topped with the left 747 wing. The upper structure creates the main house and uses the right wing as the main roof and two horizontal stabilizers as the roofs of the main bedroom and bathroom.

=== Execution ===
Hertz convinced the client to purchase the Boeing 747, originally worth about $25 million when Boeing completed it in 1970, for US$35,000. Mark Thompson of Thompson Aviation sold the airplane and his team detoxified, cut apart, and transported the plane for airlift. Using a laser and the cut-off saws at the Victorville Airport, home of the second largest airplane graveyard in the nation, the cockpit and tail were removed and the fuselage cut longitudinally. Next, transverse sectioning reduced large segments of fuselage and the wings to a manageable size for transport. A truck carried the parts, measuring 47 by 125 feet (14 by 38 m), successfully without damage. Seven California Highway Patrol vehicles escorted the truck during the night and closed multiple lanes of three major freeways, State Routes 2 and 15, and US Route 101, to accommodate the vehicle. The wings traveled from the Southern California Logistics Airport aircraft boneyard to Camarillo Airport in Camarillo, California, located 10 miles from the site. At that point, because each wing weighed approximately 20,000 lb (9,100 kg) and the only way to transport such heavy, unwieldy sections to a remote destination was from above (navigation by truck was deemed impossible), the wings needed to be cut in two for proper positioning for transport by helicopter, which was completed by a Columbia Model 234 operated by Columbia Helicopters Inc. of Portland, Oregon and took over two hours to complete. The helicopter positioned the wings on a large pile of tires at the site. The wings were then spliced back together and lifted onto columnar supports, attaching the custom fabricated steel brackets on the columns to the engine mounts on the wings. The wings touched the ground at few points creating minimal foundation requirements.

== Environmental features ==
Hundreds of airplanes had been retired to sit in the deserts of California and sold at the price of their principal raw material, aluminum. The idea of utilizing recycled components and appropriating them in creative new ways was certainly consistent with the existing context of the original Tony Duquette structures and envisioned by architect Hertz as a continuum of that concept as appropriated to today's concerns regarding minimizing primary raw material use in buildings.

The building is extremely light weight and features very few conventional materials. The main roof structure is almost entirely composed of the recycled wings. The use of the wings makes for a structure that uses materials more efficiently to achieve higher strength with less weight. Using the wings to achieve the curvilinear roof structure desired by the client saved a substantial amount of embodied energy, carbon dioxide output, and construction waste, compared to building a similar sized house made from conventional materials that would have to be transported up and down the mountain to the same location. Using the wing was also a substantial cost reduction. Even at $8–18,000 per hour for the helicopter and $30,000 for the 747, it was still a fraction of the cost of building a similarly shaped roof with conventional materials.

The 747 Wing House was built on the site where existing Duquette structures had burned. Some of the materials from the previous building were used as walkways. The use of the existing pad minimized site grading. The foundation used many of the existing concrete retaining walls but they were rebuilt and reinforced as required to meet new code regulations. This greatly reduced the amount of concrete needed to make the foundation and new walls. Because the wings are only supported in four primary places to the ground, the foundation was further minimized. Both main wings are held up entirely by the four large mounts that the engines originally hung from. By designing the weight distribution on the mounts, it allowed for the outside walls of the building to be made of high efficiency self-supporting glass instead of conventional load-bearing wooden walls. This maximizes solar gain for heating and allows the entire building to be opened to the outside. This also keeps it cool in the summers and minimizes the need for artificial light.

The home features an eight kilowatt solar array and a vacuum insulated hot water system as well as thermal solar systems for heating water. High performance glass and cellulose insulation is used in the wings to create an energy efficient building envelope.

== Future structures ==
The finished main house incorporates only the wings of the 747-131. Hertz also designed many outlying buildings that use the remaining portions of the 747 fuselage. An art studio building will use a 50-foot (15 m) long section of the upper fuselage as a roof, while the remaining front portion of the fuselage and upper first class cabin deck will be used as the roof of a guest house. The lower half of the fuselage, which forms the cargo hold, will form the roof of a barn. A meditation pavilion will be made from the entire front of the airplane, measuring 28 feet (8.5 m) in diameter and 45 feet (14 m) tall, in which the cockpit windows will form a skylight.

== Plane ==
The Boeing 747-131 was a Trans World Airlines (TWA) aircraft registered N93106. Its construction number was 19672 and it was the twenty-eighth 747 built. Boeing delivered the 747 to TWA on April 3, 1970, at a cost of approximately $25,000,000. It flew with TWA until 1992, when it was retired to the old El Mirage Air Force Base, before being purchased by Tower Air for its scrap value of $30,000.

== Gallery ==
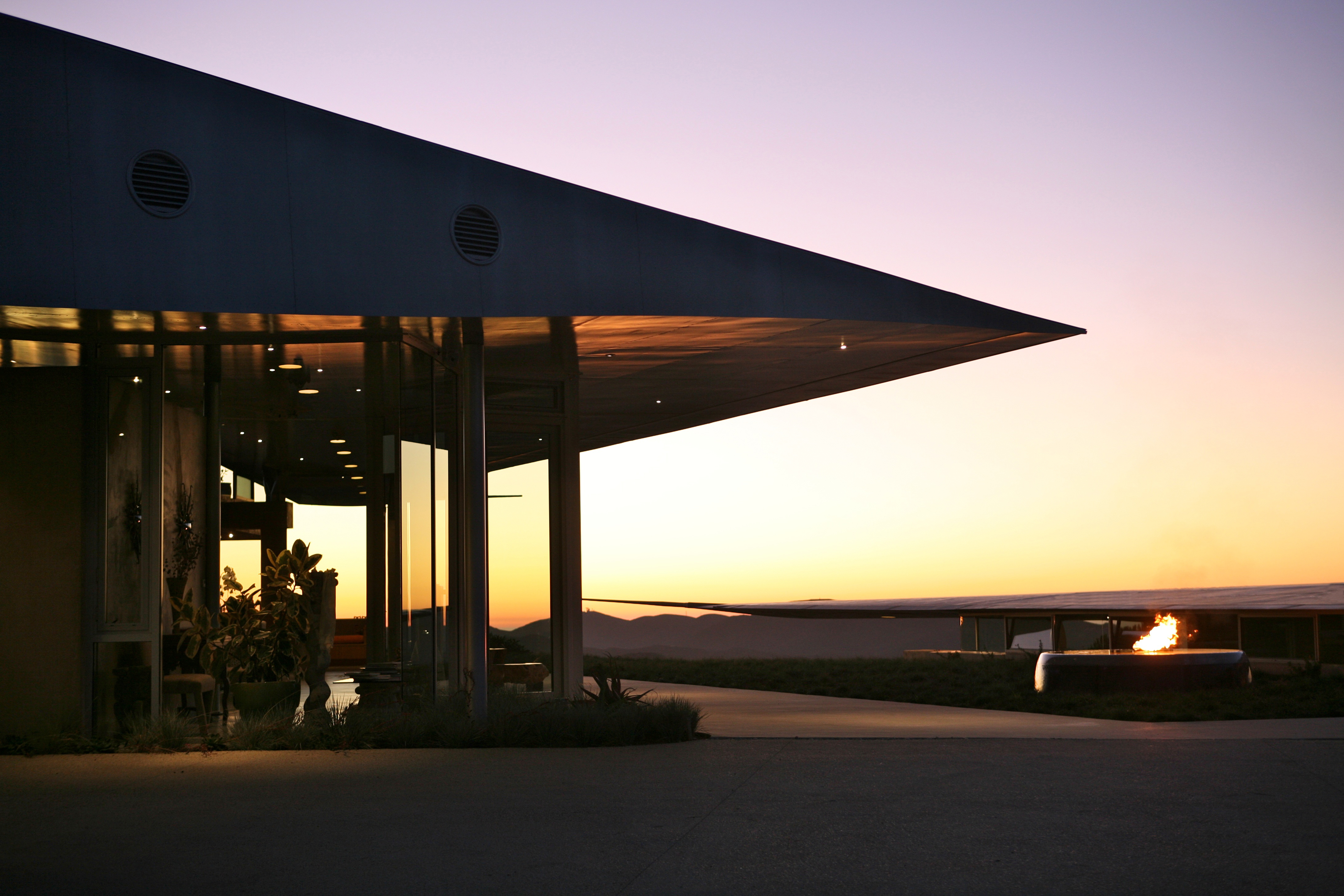

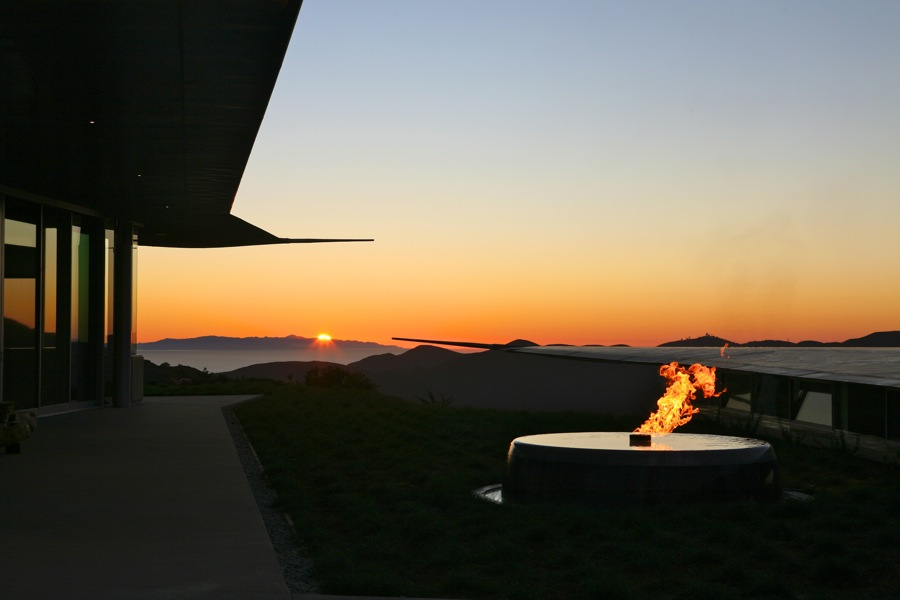

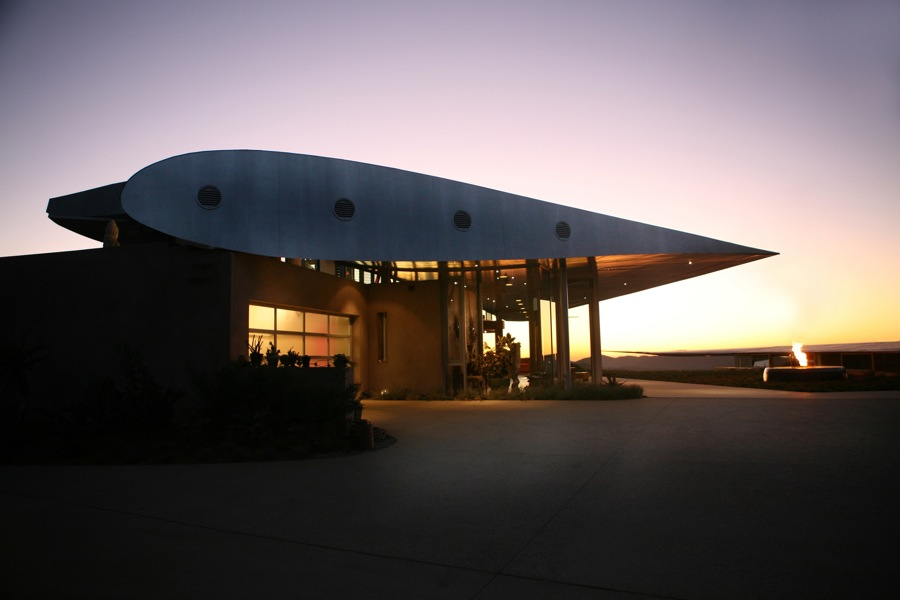

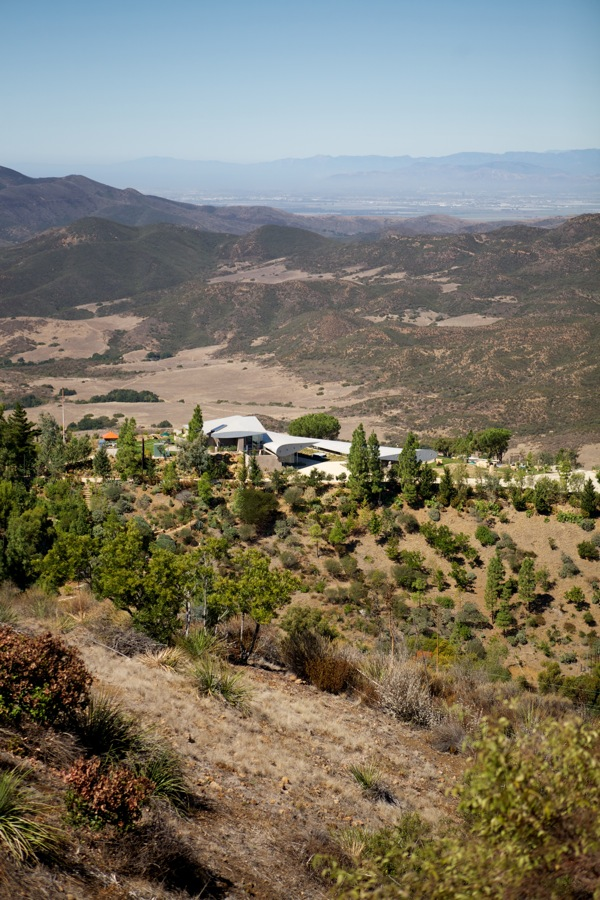

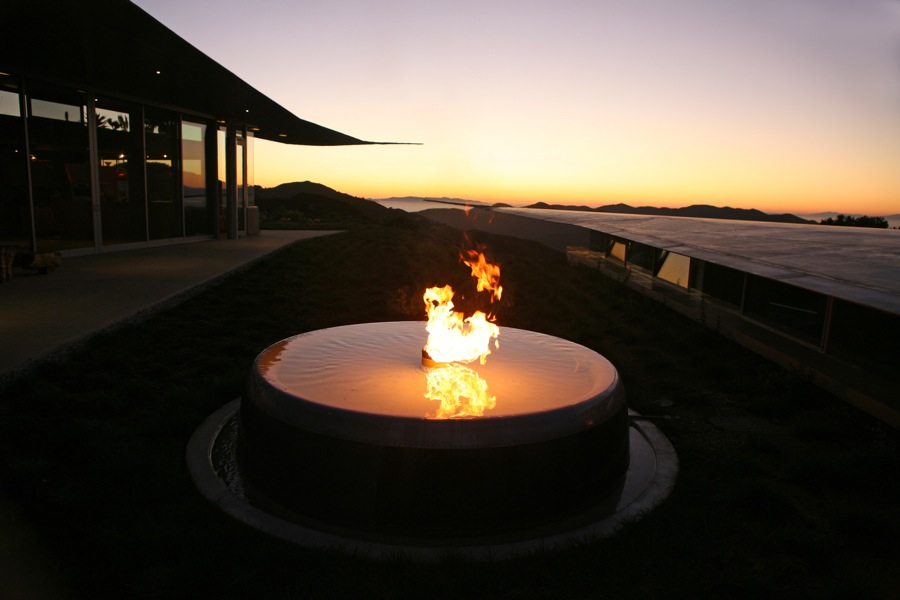

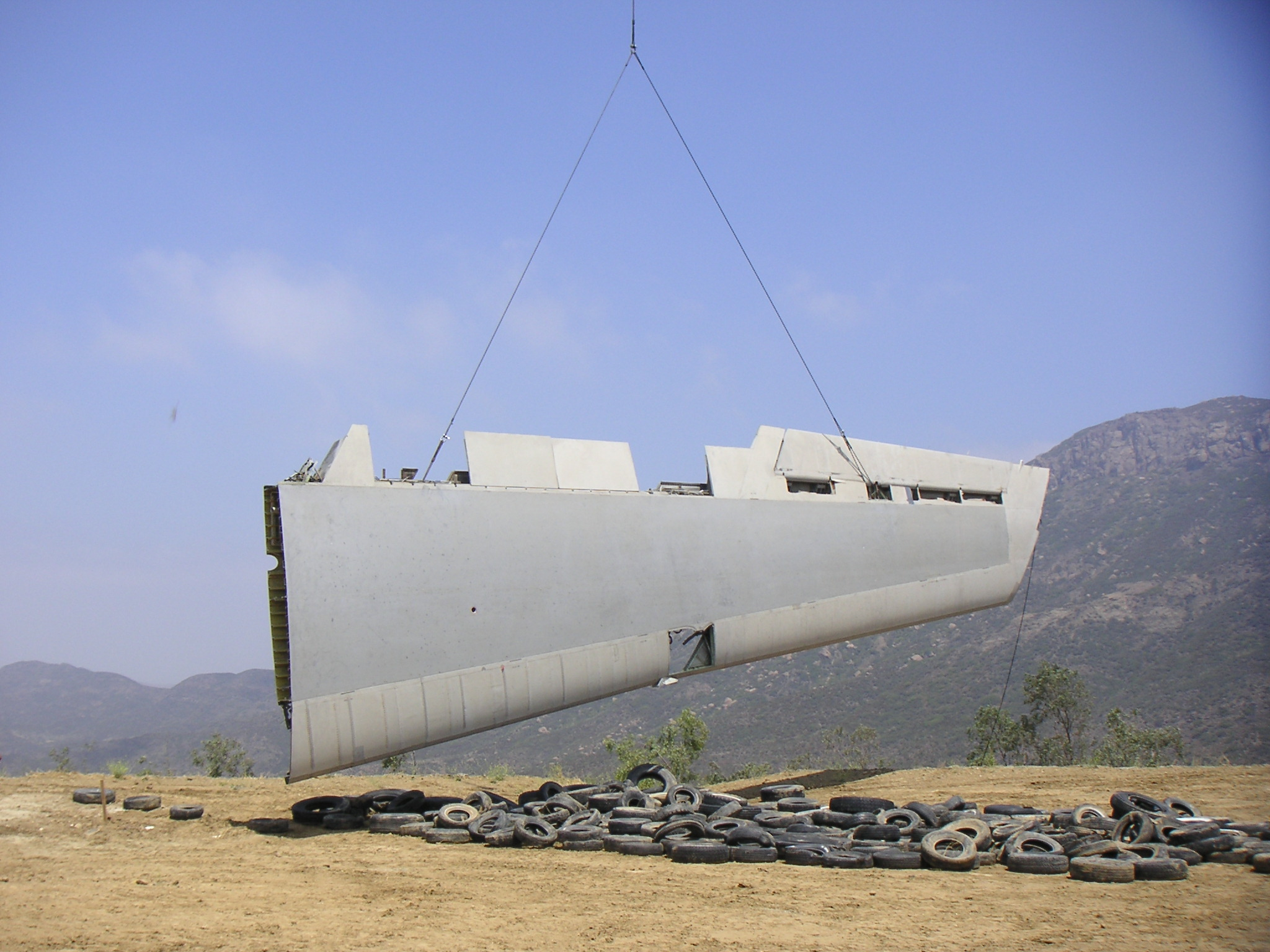

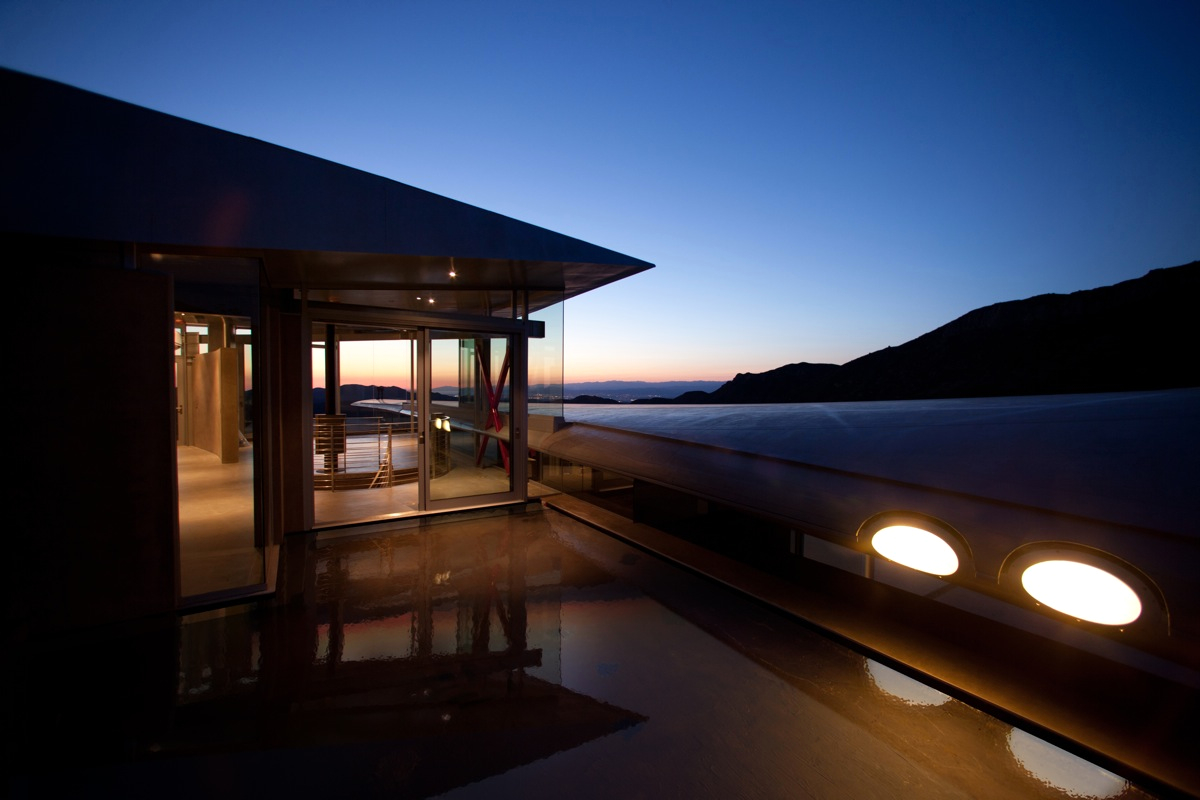

== See also ==
- David Randall Hertz
- Aircraft boneyard
- Boeing 747
- The World's Most Extraordinary Homes
