= Georgia Mackenzie =

British actress (born 1973)

- Born: 19 May 1973 (age 53)
- Occupation: Actress
- Years active: 1998–present
- Spouse: Richard Coyle (m. 2004; div. 2010)
- Relatives: Hazel Adair (grandmother)

Georgia Mackenzie (born 19 May 1973) is a British actress.

== Career ==
Mackenzie's notable screen credits include Sarah Beckenham in the BBC's BAFTA nominated series Outlaws, Jackie Haggar in ITV's Hot Money (since remade in Hollywood as Mad Money), and Sally opposite Kris Marshall in the rom-com Catwalk Dogs. She also played the role of Nurse Judy in the 2002 comedy series TLC.

On the big screen she has been seen as Paola Fonseca in Possession (2002), as Jane Graham opposite Timothy Hutton in The Kovak Box (2006), as TV chef Kathy King in Steel Trap (2007), and Teri in Franklyn (2008). Most recently, Georgia completed a well-received turn as LEA chief Jennifer Headley in BBC One's hit television drama, Waterloo Road.

In 2012, she appeared in Midsomer Murders "Murder of Innocence" as Susie Bellingham, and also in Vexed as Joanna Poynter. She also appeared in three episodes of Casualty "Secrets and Lies", "Mistakes Happen" (2013) and "Bad Timing" (2014) as Carol Walcott. In 2020, she appeared in Silent Witness "Hope: Part 1" as Ruth Cooper, and in Unforgotten as Dr. Leanne Balcombe, since 2018.

In 2019, Mackenzie narrated the documentary series Cop Car Workshop for the TV channel Dave. In 2020, she wrote an episode of Passions.

== Personal life ==
Mackenzie's father, Colin Mackenzie, was a journalist known for tracking down Ronnie Biggs in Rio de Janeiro. Her grandmother, Hazel Adair, was a screenwriter and producer who created the TV series Compact and Crossroads.

Mackenzie met actor Richard Coyle when they were filming Up Rising together in 1999. They married in 2004 and divorced in 2010.

== Filmography ==
=== Film ===
Year	Title	Role	Notes
1999	G:MT – Greenwich Mean Time	Rachel	
1999	The Criminal	Maggie	
2000	County Kilburn	Sue	
2002	Possession	Paola	
2006	The Kovak Box	Jane	
2007	Steel Trap	Kathy King	
2008	R.I.P. TV	Angela	Short film
2008	Franklyn	Teri	
2011	Demons Never Die	Helen Vora	
2014	The Man on Her Mind	Janet	
2021	Red	First Aon	Short film

=== Television ===
Year	Title	Role	Notes
1998	Undercover Heart	Hotel Receptionist	Mini-series; episode 3
1999	Passion Killers	Kim	Television film
1999–2000	A Touch of Frost	WPC Susan Kavanagh	Series 7; episodes 1 & 2: "Line of Fire: Parts 1 & 2"
2000	Up Rising	Harriet Revell	Episodes 1–5
2000	Trust	Tara Reeves	Television film
2000	Border Cafe	Ronnie	Mini-series; episodes 1–8
2001	Hot Money	Jackie Haggar	Television film
2002	TLC	Nurse Judy Conway	Episodes 1–6
2003	20 Things to Do Before You're 30	Zoe	Episodes 1–8
2003	Spine Chillers	Fleur	Episode 2: "Intuition"
2003	Trial & Retribution	PC Alison Daniels	Series 7; episodes 1 & 2: "Suspicion: Parts 1 & 2"
2004	Judas	Mary Magdalene	Television film
2004	Outlaws	Sarah Beckenham	Episodes 1–12
2005	The Robinsons	Nora	Episode 1
2005	Murphy's Law	Ellie Holloway	Series 3; episodes 1, 2 & 4–6
2005	Waking the Dead	DS Andy Stephenson	Series 5; episodes 1 & 2: "Towers of Silence: Parts 1 & 2"
2006	The Inspector Lynley Mysteries	Lisa Conroy	Series 5; episode 3: "Chinese Walls"
2007	Catwalk Dogs	Sally Purvis	Television film
2008	Honest	Catherine Flitt	Episodes 1–4
2009	Waterloo Road	Jennifer Headley	Series 5; episodes 5, 9 & 10
2012	Midsomer Murders	Susie Bellingham	Series 15; episode 2: "Murder of Innocence"
2012	Vexed	Joanna Poynter	Series 2; episode 6
2013–2014	Casualty	Carol Walcott	Series 27; episodes 43 & 44, and series 28; episode 20
2018–present	Unforgotten	Dr. Leanne Balcombe	Series 3–6; 10 episodes
2020	Silent Witness	Ruth Cooper	Series 23; episode 7: "Hope: Part 1"

=== Video games ===
Year	Title	Role	Notes
2013	Assassin's Creed IV: Black Flag	Additional multiplayer voices	
2017	Mass Effect: Andromeda	Bennas (voice)	
