= Steel Trap =

- Film poster
- Directed by: Luis Cámara
- Written by: Luis Cámara; Gabrielle Galanter
- Produced by: Daniel Baur; Oliver Simon
- Starring: Georgia Mackenzie; Mark Wilson; Pascal Langdale; Julia Ballard; Joanna Bobin; Annabelle Wallis; Adam Rayner; Frank Maier
- Cinematography: Patrick Popow
- Edited by: Wolfgang Weigl
- Music by: Florian Moser
- Distributed by: Splendid Film
- Release date: 7 November 2007
- Running time: 93 minutes
- Country: Germany
- Language: English

Steel Trap is a 2007 German horror and thriller film directed by Luis Cámara and starring Georgia Mackenzie, Mark Wilson, Pascal Langdale, Julia Ballard and Joanna Bobin. The musical score was composed by Florian Moser.

== Cast ==
- Georgia Mackenzie
- Mark Wilson
- Pascal Langdale
- Julia Ballard
- Joanna Bobin as Pamela Reynolds
- Annabelle Wallis
- Adam Rayner
- Frank Maier
- Svantje Wascher

== See also ==
- Holiday horror
