= Joanna Bobin =

English actress

- Born: Joanna Bobin; Abingdon-on-Thames, England
- Occupation: Actor
- Years active: 1982 - present
- Father: David Bobin
- Family: James Bobin (brother)

Joanna Bobin is a British actor and writer. She gained prominence as Lady Cowper in the Netflix period drama Bridgerton, for which she was nominated twice for a Screen Actor's Guild award, as well as films The Unbearable Weight of Massive Talent with Nicolas Cage and Alice Through the Looking Glass with Johnny Depp and Sacha Baron Cohen.

== Early life ==
Bobin was born in Abingdon-on-Thames and raised in Hampshire. She is the daughter of Susan Bobin (née Miller) and sports journalist and TV presenter David Bobin and sister of filmmaker James Bobin.

== Career ==
Bobin made her television debut at age 8 as Sophie, the daughter of Victoria, played by Liza Goddard in the BBC series follow-up to Take Three Girls, Take Three Women.

After studying at the University of London and Central School of Speech and Drama, Bobin launched her career primarily in television comedy, with guest leads in hit sitcoms and sketch shows such as TV Go Home, Broken News, Not Going Out, Rev, The IT Crowd and The Smoking Room, alongside Steve Coogan, Catherine Tate, Vic and Bob, Lee Mack and Ricky Gervais.

In 2007, Bobin joined the cast of the ITV hit series Secret Diary of a Call Girl as Belle's (Billie Piper) sister Jackie, a role she would play for all 3 seasons. In the interim, she appeared in Hustle and Holby City as well as the film Late Bloomers. with Isabella Rossellini and William Hurt.

As a writer, she had a comedy pilot in development with HBO.

Bobin played Alexandra Ascot in Alice Through the Looking Glass and Felicity "Flic" Jenner in the period drama Mr Selfridge. She also appeared in the film Grimsby with Sacha Baron Cohen. Bobin played Sarah Lawson in the David Hare miniseries Collateral.

In 2020 Bobin joined the cast of the Netflix period drama Bridgerton, originating the role of Lady Cowper. She also appeared in the films Gunpowder Milkshake with Lena Headey and The Unbearable Weight of Massive Talent with Nicolas Cage.

In 2026 she joined the cast of the Paramount+ crime drama series MobLand as Chief Inspector Tessa Richardson.

== Filmography ==
=== Film ===
Year	Title	Role	Notes
2007	Steel Trap	Pamela Reynolds	
2011	Late Bloomers	Karen	
2015	Miss You Already		
2016	Grimsby	Mrs Graves	
2016	Alice Through the Looking Glass	Alexandra Ascot	
2021	Gunpowder Milkshake	Rose	
2022	The Unbearable Weight of Massive Talent	Cheryl	

=== Television ===
Year	Title	Role	Notes
1982	Take Three Women	Sophie	2 episodes
2001	TVGoHome	Various	
2002	Fun at the Funeral Parlour	Penelope Granville	Episode: "The Balls of Doom"
2003	The Richard Taylor Interviews	Richard's Assistant	6 episodes
2004	The Smoking Room	Miranda	Episode: "Only Temporary"
2004	Vic and Bob's All Star Sketch Show	Various	
2004	Mile High	Natalie	1 episode
2004	Spinechillers	Isabella	1 episode
2005	Twisted Tales	Isabella Dyer	Episode: "Cursed Home"
2005	The Robinsons	Heather	1 episode
2005	Monkey Trousers	Various	4 episodes
2005	Broken News	Natalie Gosling	6 episodes
2007	The Scum Also Rises	Chloe	Television film
2007–2011	Secret Diary of a Call Girl	Jackie	10 episodes
2008	Doctors	Louise Standlish	Episode: "An Exercise in Truth"
2008	The Bill	Kelly Harper	Episode: "Lucky Lucky Lucky"
2008	Meebox	Various	Television film
2008	Genie in the House	Juliette	Episode: "Pony Tail"
2009–2010	Hustle	Hayley	2 episodes
2010	Holby City	Chloe Campbell	3 episodes
2010	Rev.	Debs	1 episode
2010	The IT Crowd	Journalist	Episode: "Reynholm vs Reynholm"
2013	Not Going Out	Rachel	Episode: "Rachel"
2013	Which is Witch?	Nicole	14 episodes
2014	Casualty	Carmen Aires	Episode: "Blood is Thicker Than Water"
2015	The Casual Vacancy	Joanna	1 episode
2016	Mr Selfridge	Felicity "Flic" Jenner	3 episodes
2018	Collateral	Sarah Lawson	2 episodes
2019	Timewasters	Cynthia Carlton-Palmer	"Timebender"
2019–2024	Bridgerton	Lady Cowper	23 episodes
2026	MobLand	CI Tessa Richardson	

== Awards and nominations ==
Year	Award	Category	Work	Result	Ref.
2021	Screen Actors Guild Awards	Outstanding Performance by an Ensemble in a Drama Series	Bridgerton	Nominated	
2025	Screen Actors Guild Awards	Outstanding Performance by an Ensemble in a Drama Series	Bridgerton	Nominated	
