= Annabelle Wallis =

British actress (born 1984)

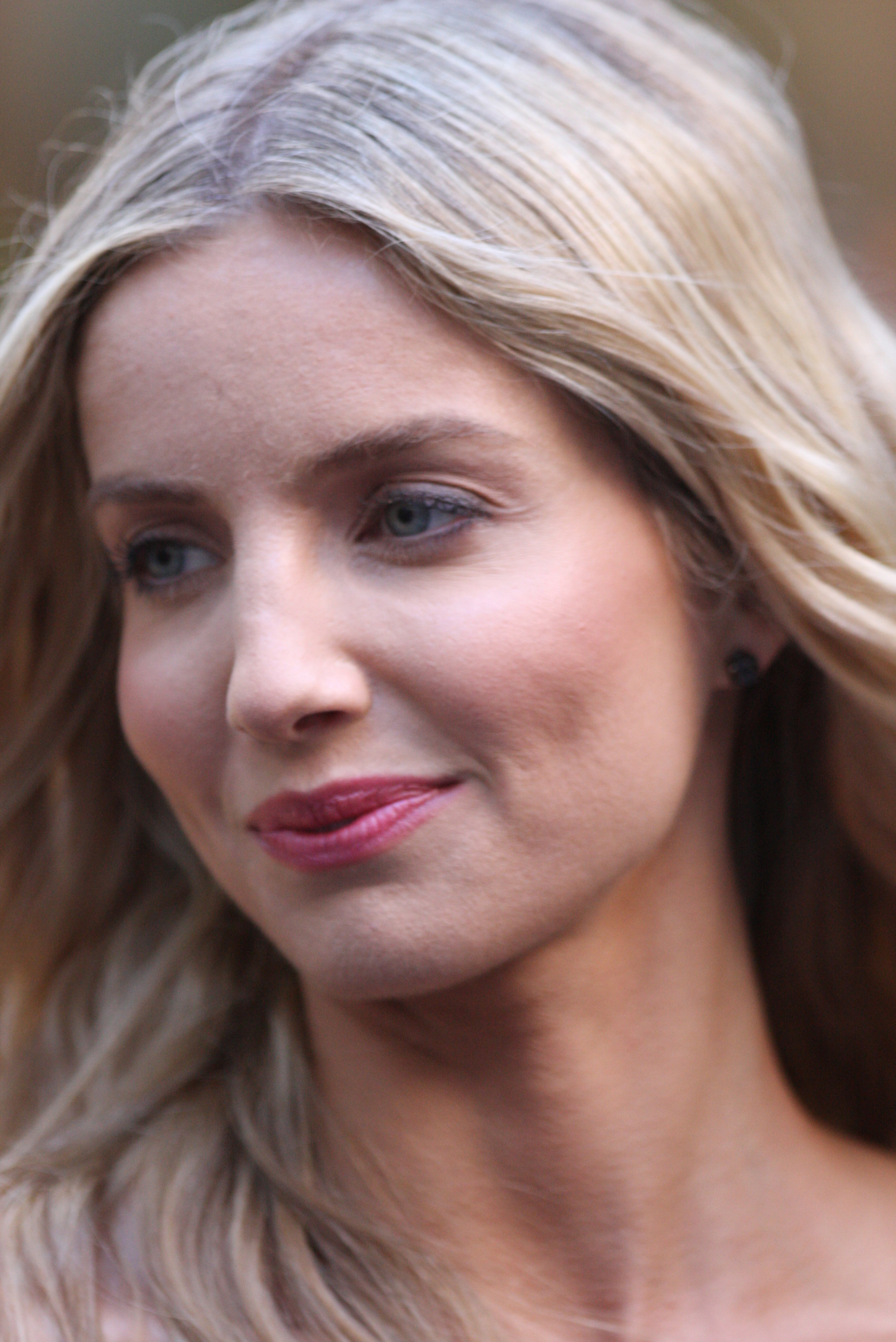
- Wallis in 2017
- Born: Annabelle Frances Wallis; 5 September 1984 (age 42); Oxford, England
- Occupation: Actress
- Years active: 2005–present
- Partner: Sebastian Stan (2022–present)
- Children: 1

Annabelle Frances Wallis (born 5 September 1984) is an English actress. She gained recognition for her work in British television, portraying Jane Seymour in the historical drama series The Tudors (2009–2010) and Grace Burgess in the period drama series Peaky Blinders (2013–2019). After a minor role in the superhero film X-Men: First Class (2011), she achieved international stardom for headlining the supernatural horror Annabelle (2014), earning an MTV Movie Award nomination. She went on to star in the action adventure film The Mummy (2017), the comedy film Tag (2018), the horror film Malignant (2021), and the thriller film Mercy (2026).

Wallis is a feminist and supports many charitable causes. She has been in a relationship with actor Sebastian Stan since 2022 and they have one child.

== Early life ==
Wallis was born on 5 September 1984 in Oxford, Oxfordshire, England. Her maternal great uncle was Irish actor Richard Harris. Her first cousins once removed include English actors Jared Harris, Jamie Harris, and director Damian Harris. On her father's side, she is a descendant of English singer Marie Lloyd. Her older brother Francis is a director who has worked for fashion designer Michael Kors and singers Pixie Lott and Birdy.

She was raised in the Portuguese municipality of Cascais, where her family immigrated when she was 18 months old. As a result of attending international schools, she speaks fluent English, Portuguese, French, and Spanish. She also learned Italian for her role in the film, Vanished into the Night.

== Career ==
=== 2005–2012: Career beginnings ===
In Portugal, Wallis appeared in several short films before she moved to London to pursue a career in film. In London, she did some advertisements and looked into drama schools before ultimately deciding to find an agent.

In 2005 she landed a lead role in the Indian film Dil Jo Bhi Kahey..., but it did not fare well at the box office. She landed small parts in True True Lie (2006) alongside Jaime King; and Body of Lies (2008), playing Mark Strong’s girlfriend. She starred in the B-movie Steel Trap (2008).

In television, her breakthrough was in season three of the Showtime drama series The Tudors (2009) as Jane Seymour, where she replaced actress Anita Briem. In the following years, she starred in the television film The Lost Future (2010) alongside Sam Claflin; and in the ABC series Pan Am (2011), which was cancelled after one season.

In 2011, she was directed by Madonna in W.E. and had a small part in X-Men: First Class. In 2012, she appeared in Jared Leto's documentary, Artifact, and in Snow White and the Huntsman, but was not credited.

=== 2013–2017: Peaky Blinders and blockbusters ===
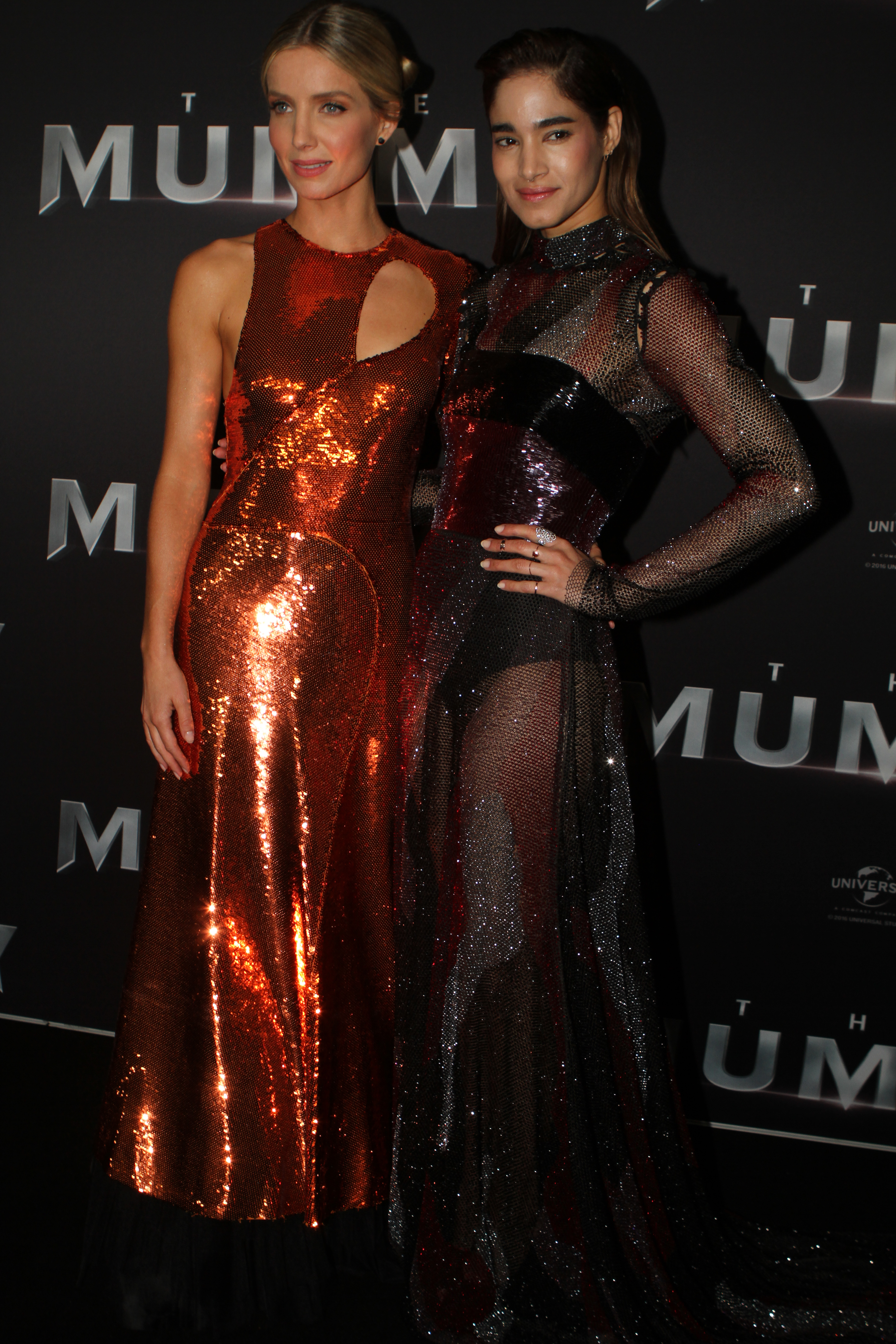
Wallis and Sofia Boutella at The Mummy premiere in Sydney

Wallis starred as Grace Burgess in the BBC drama Peaky Blinders from 2013 to 2016. The series received critical and public acclaim.

In 2014, she joined The Conjuring Universe with a leading role in the horror film Annabelle, directed by John R. Leonetti and produced by James Wan. The film was a box-office success but received negative reviews. However, critics praised Wallis's performance, and she was nominated at the 2015's MTV Movie & TV Awards for Best Scared-As-S**t Performance. She returned as Mia Form in Annabelle: Creation (2017).

In 2014, she also portrayed Muriel Wright, the original Bond girl, on the mini-series Fleming: The Man Who Would Be Bond alongside actor Dominic Cooper.

In 2016, she starred in the action comedy film Grimsby, the drama Come and Find Me and the psychological thriller war film Mine.

In 2017, Wallis joined the Dark Universe created by Universal Pictures and starred as archaeologist Jenny Halsey in The Mummy, a reboot of The Mummy franchise. Wallis did almost all of her stunts herself including a Zero-G scene that almost killed her. The film received negative reviews and was a box office bomb. The same year she joined Guy Ritchie's King Arthur: Legend of the Sword.

=== 2018–present: Diversification and leading parts ===
In 2018, Wallis landed a lead in the American comedy Tag as Rebecca Crosby. Later that year, she reunited with film director Alex Kurtzman for the Star Trek: Short Treks episode "Calypso", where she voiced the artificial intelligence Zora. She later reprised the character in a recurring role on Star Trek: Discovery.

In April 2018, she was announced as Cartier's ambassador for jewellery and the new face of the Panthère de Cartier watch.

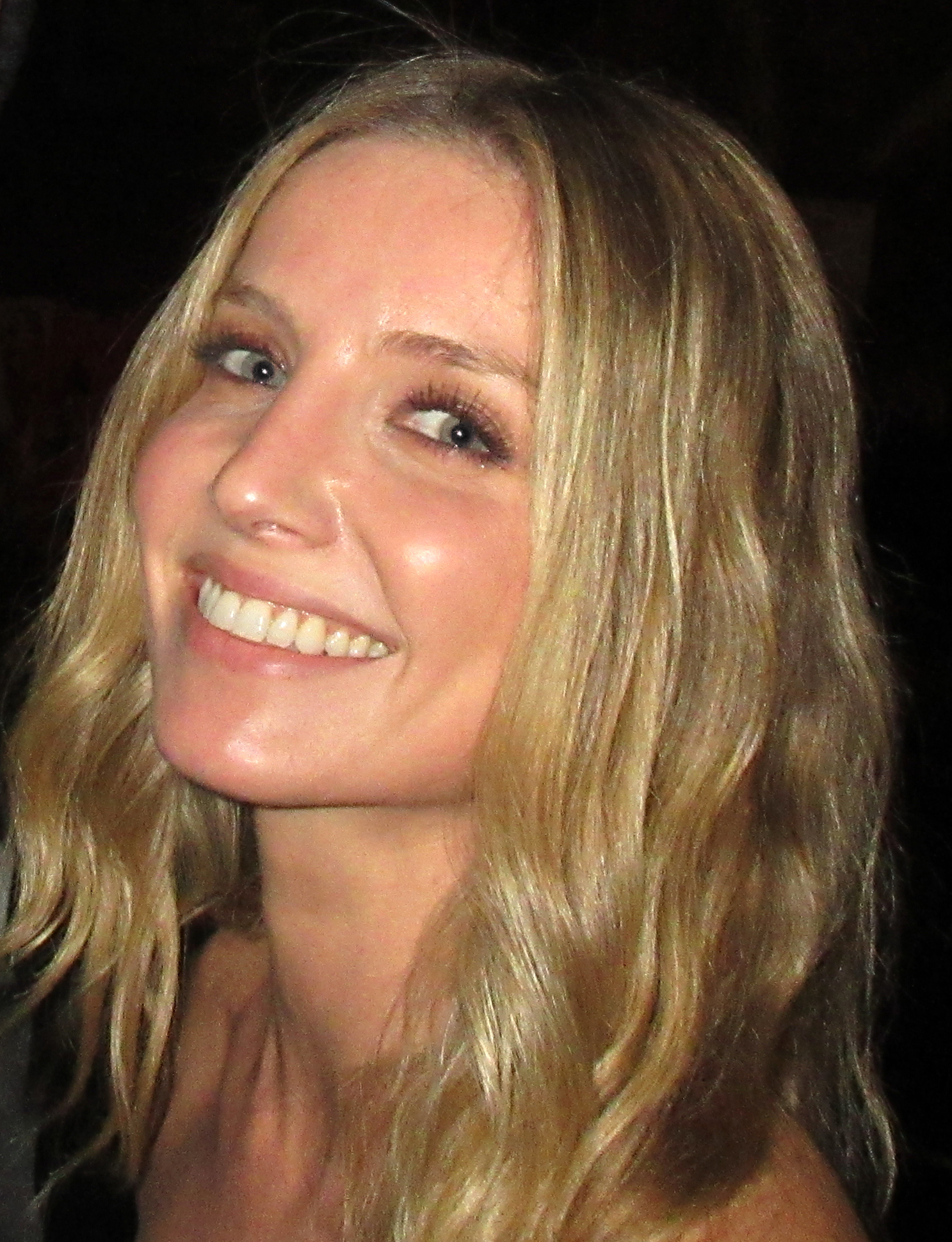
Wallis in 2019

In 2019, Wallis joined Showtime's mini-series The Loudest Voice as Laurie Luhn, Head of Booking at Fox News Channel and Roger Ailes's long-time "mistress". Luhn is one of Ailes's first victims to break silence and denounce him, alongside Gretchen Carlson. The series received generally favourable reviews and was nominated at the Golden Globe Awards for Best Limited Series or Television Film. Wallis's performance was praised and seen as "heartbreakingly powerful work" by the Chicago Sun Times. Later that year, Wallis reprised her role as Grace Shelby in the fifth season of Peaky Blinders.

In 2020, she starred in Robin Pront's thriller film The Silencing. Its premiere at the South by Southwest festival in March 2020 was cancelled due to the COVID-19 pandemic; it was finally released on DirecTV on 16 July 2020.

Also in 2020, Wallis starred as Princess Buttercup in Home Movie: The Princess Bride for Quibi to raise money for World Central Kitchen and she joined the cast of Floria Sigismondi's third film, The Silence of Mercy. Shooting ended in March 2021.

In 2021, Wallis starred in James Wan's horror film Malignant. Scheduled by Warner Bros to premiere in August 2020, the release was postponed due to the COVID-19 pandemic, opening on 10 September 2021, simultaneously in theaters and on HBO Max. The film is a tribute to the giallo genre, and follows Madison Mitchell, played by Wallis, who is "paralyzed by shocking visions of grisly murders," and as her torment continues, "discovers that these waking dreams are in fact terrifying realities." It is the first R-rated US movie to be released in China.

That same year, Wallis appeared in the science fiction action film Boss Level directed by Joe Carnahan, starring Frank Grillo and Mel Gibson and starred in Agata Alexander's science fiction thriller Warning, alongside Alice Eve and Alex Pettyfer. She also appeared in the Christmas black comedy Silent Night, directed by Camille Griffin, premiered at the Toronto International Film Festival in September. Wallis stars alongside Keira Knightley, Matthew Goode and Roman Griffin Davis.

In March 2024, Wallis joined Amazon MGM Studios' sci-fi thriller entitled Mercy, alongside Rebecca Ferguson and Chris Pratt. She also starred in Renato De Maria's 2024 Netflix film, Vanished into the Night, alongside Riccardo Scamarcio.

== Activism ==
Wallis is a feminist. In February 2018, she attended the Letters Live event curated by Net-à-Porter in Los Angeles, where she read a letter from suffragette Emmeline Pankhurst. The money raised was donated to Women for Women International.

Wallis supports Save The Children and participated to the #ChristmasJumper campaign in November 2018. In September 2019, she joined the U.n.I (You and I) project for UNICEF. She is committed to the NGO Choose Love (formerly Help Refugees), which provides humanitarian aid to refugees around the world and advocates for them. She attended the launch of Choose Love's store in Los Angeles in December 2019.

In April 2020, during the COVID-19 pandemic, Wallis teamed up with her friend and fashion designer Georgia Hardinge to raise funds for the charity Age UK. Along with other celebrities, she joined the movement #SaveWithStories in partnership with Save The Children and No Kid Hungry, which aimed to provide fun and education to children and parents stuck at home during the pandemic.

== Personal life ==
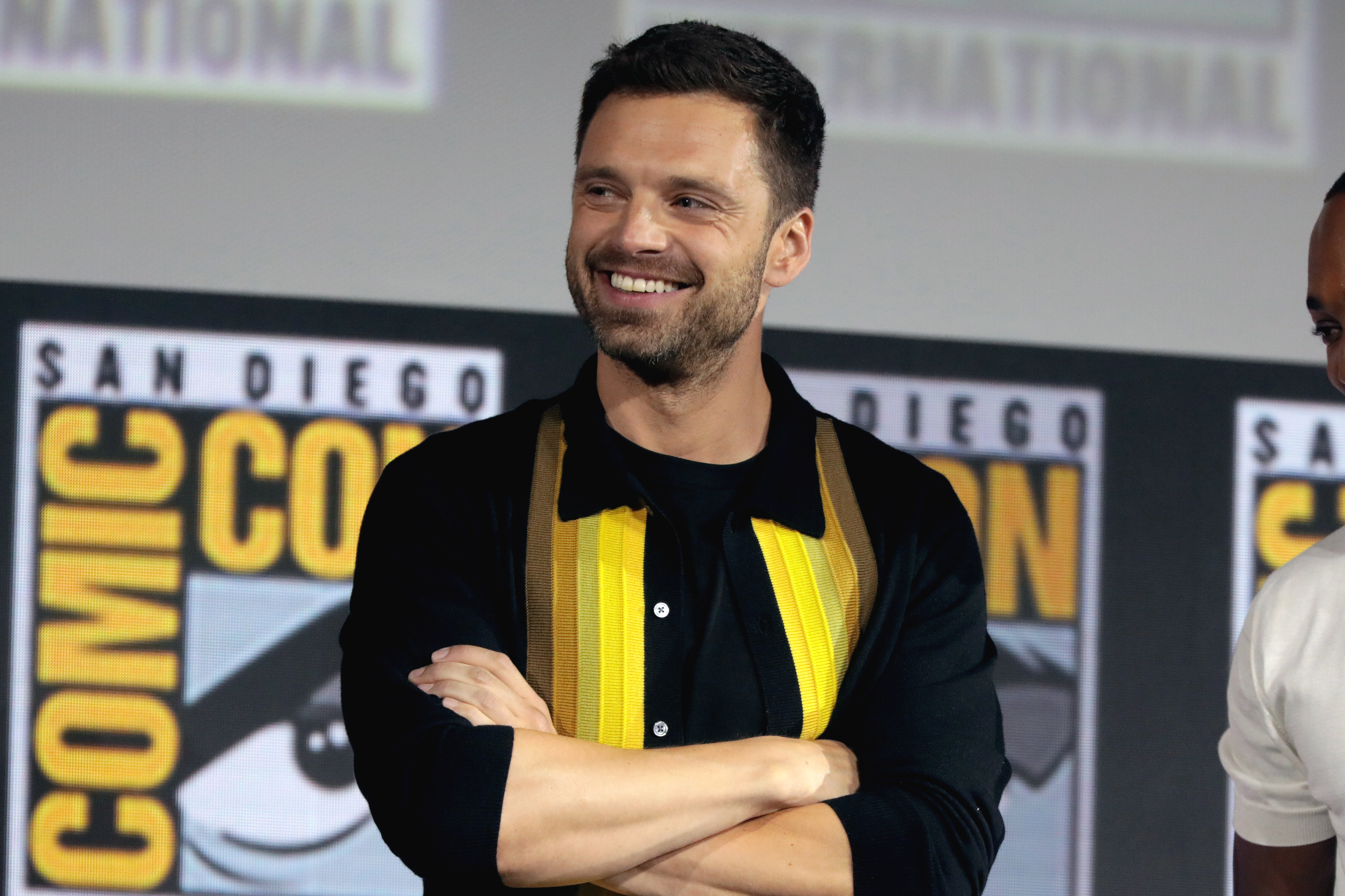
Wallis has dated Sebastian Stan (pictured) since 2022 and they have one child

Wallis was in a relationship with Burberry model James Rousseau from 2010 to 2014. From 2015 to 2017, Wallis was in a relationship with Coldplay lead singer Chris Martin. She appeared in the music video for Coldplay's "Hymn for the Weekend" and provided background vocals to their song "Up&Up". From 2018 to 2021, she was in a relationship with American actor Chris Pine.

Wallis has been in a relationship with Romanian-American actor Sebastian Stan since 2022. In May 2026, Deadline announced that they were expecting their first child together. In July 2026, Wallis gave birth to their first child.

== Filmography ==
=== Film ===
Key
†	Denotes films that have not yet been released

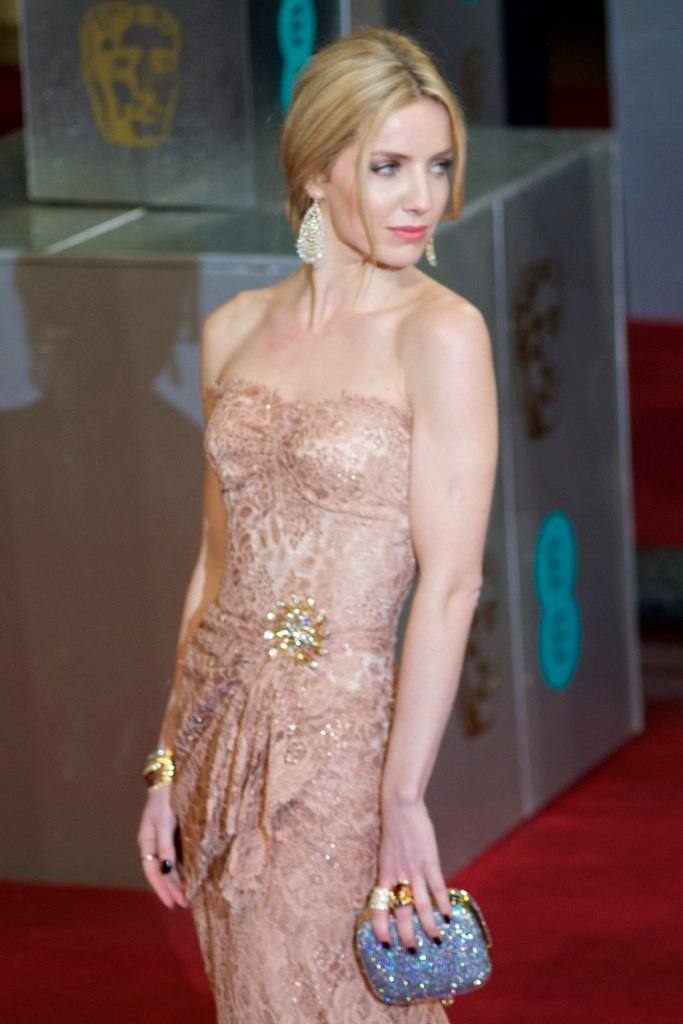
Wallis at the 2013 BAFTAs

Year	Title	Role	Notes
2005	Dil Jo Bhi Kahey...	Sophie Besson	Bollywood movie
2006	True True Lie	Paige	
2007	Steel Trap	Melanie	
2008	Body of Lies	Hani's Girlfriend in Bar	
2009	Right Hand Drive	Ruth	
2011	X-Men: First Class	Amy	
2011	W.E.	Arabella Green	
2013	Hello Carter	Kelly	
2014	Annabelle	Mia Form	
2014	Sword of Vengeance	Annabelle / Anna	
2016	Grimsby	Lina Smit	
2016	Come and Find Me	Claire Collins	
2016	Mine	Jenny	
2017	King Arthur: Legend of the Sword	Maid Maggie	
2017	The Mummy	Dr. Jenny Halsey	
2017	Annabelle: Creation	Mia Form	
2018	Tag	Rebecca Crosby	
2020	The Silencing	Sheriff Alice Gustafson	
2021	Boss Level	Alice	
2021	Malignant	Madison "Maddie" Lake-Mitchell / Emily May	
2021	Silent Night	Sandra	
2021	Warning	Nina	
2024	Vanished into the Night	Elena Walgren	
2026	Mercy	Nicole Raven	
2026	Mutiny	Angie Ellis	
2026	Unabomber	Christiana Morgan	
TBA	Pedro Pan †	Ms. Penny Powers	Post-production

=== Television ===
Key
†	Denotes television productions that have not yet been released

Year	Title	Role	Notes
2005	Jericho	Lizzie Way	Episode: "The Killing of Johnny Swan"
2007	Diana: Last Days of a Princess	Kelly Fisher	Television film
2009	Ghost Town	Serena	Television film
2009–2010	The Tudors	Jane Seymour	5 episodes
2010	The Lost Future	Dorel	Television film
2011	Strike Back: Project Dawn	Dana Van Rijn	2 episodes
2011	Pan Am	Bridget Pierce	4 episodes
2013–2019	Peaky Blinders	Grace Burgess	19 episodes
2014	Fleming: The Man Who Would Be Bond	Muriel Wright	2 episodes
2014	The Musketeers	Ninon de Larroque	Episode: "A Rebellious Woman"
2018	Star Trek: Short Treks	Zora	Voice; episode: "Calypso"
2019	The Loudest Voice	Laurie Luhn	7 episodes
2020	Home Movie: The Princess Bride	Princess Buttercup	Episode: "Chapter One: As You Wish"
2020–2024	Star Trek: Discovery	Zora	Voice; recurring role

=== Music videos ===
Year	Title	Artist	Notes
2014	"Divine Love"	Victoria+Jean	
2016	"Hymn for the Weekend"	Coldplay	
2019	"U.n.I. (You & I)"	Various	Charity song for UNICEF

== Discography ==
- A Head Full of Dreams, vocals on song "Up&Up".

== Awards and nominations ==
Year	Award	Category	Work	Result
2015	MTV Movie & TV Awards	Best Scared-As-Shit Performance	Annabelle	Nominated
2018	Alliance of Women Film Journalists	Most Egregious Age Difference Between the Leading Man and the Love Interest	The Mummy	Nominated
