= Passion Killers =

Passion Killers may refer to:

- Passion Killers (film), 1999 television film produced by Andy Harries
- Passion Killers (play), 1994 play by John Godber
- Passion Killers, 2008 novel by Linda Regan
- Passion Killers, an 1980s Yorkshire punk band with members who went on to form Chumbawamba
