= Hot Money =

2001 British TV crime drama film

- Caroline Quentin and Kate Williams as Bridget Watmore and Molly Stern
- Genre: Crime drama
- Written by: Terry Winsor
- Screenplay by: Neil McKay
- Directed by: Terry Winsor
- Starring: Caroline Quentin; Gerard Horan; Kate Williams; Georgia Mackenzie; Jay Simpson; Melanie Hill; Cliff Parisi
- Music by: Colin Towns
- Composer: Colin Towns
- Country of origin: United Kingdom
- Original language: English

Production
- Executive producer: Jeff Pope
- Producer: Jeremy Phillips
- Cinematography: John Daly
- Editor: Edward Mansell
- Running time: 90 minutes
- Production company: Granada Television

Original release
- Network: ITV
- Release: 12 December 2001

Hot Money is a British television crime drama film, written by Neil McKay and directed by Terry Winsor, first broadcast on ITV on 12 December 2001. Inspired by the Loughton incinerator thefts, the film stars Caroline Quentin as Bridget Watmore, a cleaner at the Bank of England who hatches a plot "for impoverished workers to pinch cash" before it is incinerated. The film was commissioned by ITV in January 2001, as one of two new projects to star Quentin, with the other, Blood Strangers, following in 2002. Nick Elliott, then controller of drama at ITV, described Quentin as being "...very good at playing very ordinary women." Filming began in February 2001.

The film received a 44% audience share between 9pm and 11pm, where it was screened against a Panorama investigative special programme on BBC One. Consolidated figures revealed the film drew 9.62 million viewers on its debut broadcast. Reception by newspaper critics ranged from "inadequate script" (Daily Telegraph) to "thrilling comedy caper" (Mirror). In 2008, the film was remade in the United States under the title Mad Money, starring Diane Keaton as Bridget, Katie Holmes as Jackie, Queen Latifah as Nina, and Ted Danson as Don. Lindsay Lohan was initially cast to play Jackie, but was replaced due to a lack of completion bond.

== Plot ==
Hot Money tells the story of three workers at the Bank of England incinerating plant in Essex. The trio, led by Bridget (Caroline Quentin), hatch a plan to steal thousands of pounds by stashing the notes in their underwear.

== Method ==
Each of the cages containing money set to be incinerated is locked with two padlocks; one black and one white. The key to the white padlock is held by supervisor Liz Hoodless (Melanie Hill), while the only person who holds a black key is boss Mr. Glover (Shaun Curry). Together, they open a cage, the money is counted, placed back in the cage, padlocked again with two new locks by Jackie Haggar (Georgia Mackenzie), and sent to the vault, before it is incinerated. Cleaner Bridget (Caroline Quentin) enlists the help of her colleagues Liz and Jackie to steal the money using the following method:

• While cleaning, Bridget discreetly takes two of the padlocks used to lock the cages of money to be incinerated, a black one and a white one.
• In the bathroom, Bridget spray paints the white padlock black, masking the scent with strong smelling toilet cleaner. She hides the painted padlock in a toilet cistern.
• Jackie, whose job it is to re-padlock the cages after they have been counted, retrieves the painted padlock from the toilet cistern and palms it to the counting room.
• In the counting room, Jackie collects a new white padlock, and pairs it together with the painted black padlock. She locks the cage closed.
• Passing Bridget, who is cleaning in the corridor, she whispers the number of the cage with the painted padlock on it.
• Liz, a supervisor who is a holder of the white key, throws away a cigarette packet containing the white key in to Bridget's bin as they pass in the corridor.
• Bridget heads to the vault, where she quickly locates the correct cage, unlocks the white padlock and the painted black padlock with the same white key, empties the money in to her bin, and locks it back up again with the original white padlock, and a genuine black padlock she stole earlier.
• Back in the bathroom, she meets Liz and Jackie, where they all fill their underwear with the stolen cash. Bridget returns the white key to Liz and washes the black paint off the white padlock with white spirit.
• Bridget returns the painted padlock, now back to being white, in to its case.
• The trio leave work with their contraband.

== Cast ==
- Caroline Quentin as Bridget Watmore
- Gerard Horan as Don Watmore
- Kate Williams as Molly Stern
- Georgia Mackenzie as Jackie Haggar
- Jay Simpson as Barry Weller
- Melanie Hill as Liz Hoodless
- Cliff Parisi as Bob Hoodless
- Christine Ellerbeck as Mrs. Riddell
- Shaun Curry as Mr. Glover
- Dickon Tolson as Sean
- Joan Hodges as Irene Haggar
- Josie Kidd as Nancy Weller
- Michael Jayes as Ralph Barnett-Leigh
- Melissa Lloyd as DS Sally Markham
- Michael Brogan as DI Jim Fenwick
- Richenda Carey as Judge Lucinda Winchcombe
