= David Bobin =

English sports journalist

- Born: November 1945; Hampshire, England
- Died: 24 May 2017 (aged 71)
- Occupations: Journalist, television presenter
- Children: James and Joanna

David Bobin (November 1945 – 24 May 2017) was an English sports journalist mainly known for his work on television.

== Biography ==
Bobin was educated at Abingdon School from 1957 to 1962 and was a keen rower.

He began his career as a newspaper journalist in Oxford and also worked for BBC Radio Oxford during the 1960s before graduating to television with Southern Television in 1975. He continued to appear on ITV with Southern's successor franchises Television South and Meridian Broadcasting. Bobin also served as anchor on the former's news programme Coast to Coast.

He left terrestrial television in 1993 when he joined Sky Sports where he has fronted their coverage of Spain's La Liga as well as appearing regularly as a presenter on Sky Sports News.

Bobin's son is British film director, writer, and producer James Bobin, who is best known for directing 2011 film The Muppets. His daughter Joanna Bobin is an actress.

Bobin's death at the age of 71 was first reported on the Twitter account of Sky Sports colleague Simon Thomas on 26 May 2017 and was subsequently reported by several news outlets.

== See also ==
List of Old Abingdonians
