= Outlaws (2004 TV series) =

- DVD cover
- Genre: Comedy drama
- Created by: Steve Coombes
- Written by: Steve Coombes
- Directed by: John Alexander; Harry Bradbeer; Richard Laxton
- Starring: Phil Daniels; Ray Emmet Brown; Georgia Mackenzie; Annabelle Apsion; Rebekah Staton
- Country of origin: United Kingdom
- Original language: English
- No. of series: 1
- No. of episodes: 12

Production
- Executive producers: Simon Heath; Gareth Neame
- Producer: Victoria Fea
- Cinematography: David Marsh
- Editor: David Barrett
- Running time: 30 minutes
- Production company: World Productions

Original release
- Network: BBC Three
- Release: 1 October – 17 December 2004

Outlaws is a British television comedy drama series, first broadcast on BBC Three on 1 October 2004, that ran for a total of twelve episodes across a single series. The series stars Phil Daniels as Bruce Dunbar, the head of a shifty legal firm dealing in criminal law, who trains new employee Theodore Gulliver (Ray Emmet Brown) in his fairly underhand methods. While Gulliver, fighting Dunbar's influence, tries to do his job as best he can, Dunbar has his own problems, from clients who ransack his offices, to dealing with his self-abusive teenage daughter. Produced by World Productions, the series was described as a mixture of black comedy and an accurate portrayal of the inner workings of the British legal system.

Alongside Daniels and Brown, the series also starred Georgia Mackenzie, Annabelle Apsion, and Rebekah Staton. Due to widespread critical acclaim and strong viewing figures, the series received a terrestrial broadcast, airing from 9 January 2005 on BBC Two. Tom Sutcliffe of The Independent commented that "Outlaws is brisk and funny and has a compelling frontman in Daniels. It is also informative about a world in which fine abstractions about justice and rehabilitation have crumbled into a set of cynical lash-ups. Panorama eat your heart out." Despite calls for a second series, Outlaws was not recommissioned by BBC executives and was subsequently axed.

The complete series was released on DVD on 28 March 2005.

== Cast ==
- Phil Daniels as Bruce Dunbar; partner of Bagnall & Dunbar and senior defence solicitor
- Ray Emmet Brown as Theodore Gulliver; junior partner of Bagnall & Dunbar and junior defence solicitor
- Georgia Mackenzie as Sarah Beckenham; a CPS prosecutor known for her strong success record
- Annabelle Apsion as Elaine Ross; custody sergeant with the local police force
- Rebekah Staton as Janey Wallace; Bagnall & Dunbar office receptionist
- Craig Parkinson as Spinky Sutherland; a fellow CPS prosecutor who has a strikingly-low success record, often losing the simplest of cases on minor technicalities.
- Danny Cunningham as DC Danny Simons; corrupt police officer with the local police force who often makes use of the "TICs" to increase his clean-up rates.
- Connor McIntyre as Superintendent Gary Jackson; the divisional head of the local police force, who is also in a relationship with Dunbar's ex-wife, and is stepfather to Dunbar's only daughter.
- Craig Fitzpatrick as Connor Reilly; a vulnerable teenager suffering from a mental health disorder which results in him repeatedly burning down the care homes that he has been sent to live in.
- Harmage Singh Kalirai as Mr. Singh; a local defence solicitor whom Dunbar often unloads his "useless" cases on, purely on the basis of Singh's reputation of "being the worst solicitor in town".
- Ian Hanmore as Judge Roberts; a magistrate court judge.
- Mary Cunningham as Judge Grainger; a fellow magistrate court judge.
- Andrew Readman as Judge Jackson; a fellow magistrate court judge who often berates Dunbar for his use of over-excessive claims about his clients' "deprived childhood(s)" and "deceased mother(s)".
- Marvin Brown as Flymo; a young gangster called Flymo because he always cuts the grass.

== Episodes ==
No.	Title	Directed by	Written by	Original release date
1	"The Good, The Bad and the Ugly"	Harry Bradbeer	Steve Coombes	1 October 2004
Gulliver's first day at the firm proves to be an eye-opener as he deals with a mental juvenile who has tried to burn down his children's home eleven times, and learns that the value of representing a thief who stole a £20 football shirt is much greater than he first thought. Dunbar attempts to get a suspected drug dealer off the hook by attempting to expose the corrupt activities of DC Simons.
2	"T.I.C. The Box"	Harry Bradbeer	Steve Coombes	8 October 2004
Gulliver's naivety in dealing with the police earns him a dressing down from Dunbar after his defence of a juvenile thief goes pear shaped. Dunbar's own attempt at bargaining with the police goes horribly wrong when he attempts to secure protection for a drug dealer who was caught speeding. Simons' chances of promotion are scuppered when a burglar defended by Gulliver decides to admit to his own TICs.
3	"Little Criminals"	Harry Bradbeer	Steve Coombes	15 October 2004
Dunbar's unimpressed when Gulliver tries to help a pimp's underage girlfriend, who has been detained after being caught riding in a stolen vehicle. Sarah makes herself unpopular by sticking to the letter of the law and providing Dunbar with evidence that assists in getting the case against a juvenile accused of murdering a police officer dropped. Gulliver continues to try to find an appropriate rehabilitation facility for Conor.
4	"The Value of Nothing"	Harry Bradbeer	Steve Coombes	22 October 2004
After Dunbar unexpectedly bags himself a date, he takes her back to the office for a little light relief. However, after failing to lock the officer door, the next morning he arrives to find he has been burgled. His day goes from bad to worse when he defends a conman who claims that the charge for his which he has been presented, of credit card theft, is not his MO - which he takes at face value. Big mistake...
5	"The Soft Spot"	Richard Laxton	Tony Basgallop	29 October 2004
A prostitute's love beads prove an interesting case for Dunbar.
6	"Sins of the Father"	Richard Laxton	Steve Coombes	5 November 2004
Dunbar is forced to take responsibility for his self-harming teenage daughter.
7	"Three Monkeys"	Richard Laxton	Richard Zajdlic	12 November 2004
Gulliver faces an identity crisis when called upon to defend a blind racist, while Dunbar refuses to intervene in a violent marriage.
8	"The Power and the Glory"	Richard Laxton	Jimmy Gardner	19 November 2004
Gulliver takes on a potentially explosive case when he tackles the anti-terrorism squad. Meanwhile, Dunbar finds himself left on the sidelines once again as he deals with the theft of a frozen steak.
9	"A Life of Grime"	John Alexander	Anita J. Pandolfo	26 November 2004
Dunbar finds himself on the wrong end of a court appearance for failing to make sufficient maintenance payments to his ex-wife. Gulliver gets a visit from his dad.
10	"Damaged Goods"	John Alexander	Steve Coombes	3 December 2004
Dunbar mentors a 14-year-old who is about to be placed under an Anti-Social Behaviour Order. Sarah celebrates the fact she's been accepted on a course to train as a district judge, but her joyous night ends on the wrong side of the law.
11	"A Dying Breed"	John Alexander	Jimmy Gardner	10 December 2004
When the head of a local haulier offers the firm all his legal business, Dunbar thinks his ship's come in. When Gulliver faces Sarah in court, he sees a different side to her.
12	"The Decline of English Murder"	John Alexander	Steve Coombes	17 December 2004
Will Dunbar be seduced by the chance of an easy life and a decent salary, or can Gulliver make him change his mind? Maybe a nice juicy murder will do the trick.
