= Vanished into the Night =

2024 thriller film

- Italian: Svaniti nella notte
- Directed by: Renato De Maria
- Screenplay by: Luca Infascelli; Francesca Marciano
- Based on: 7th Floor by Patxi Amezcua and Alejo Flah
- Produced by: Giacomo Durzi; Roberto Sessa
- Starring: Riccardo Scamarcio; Annabelle Wallis
- Cinematography: Daniele Massaccesi
- Edited by: Cristiano Travaglioli
- Music by: Jeff Russo
- Distributed by: Netflix
- Release date: July 11, 2024
- Running time: 1h 32m
- Languages: Italian; English

Vanished into the Night (Italian: Svaniti nella notte) is a 2024 Italian thriller film directed by Renato De Maria and starring Riccardo Scamarcio and Annabelle Wallis. It is a remake of Patxi Amezcua's 7th Floor (2013).

When their children disappear into thin air, two parents are told to come up with a 150,000 euros ransom and will do anything to bring them back.

The film was released online on July 11, 2024.

== Plot ==
Pietro Torre and Elena Walgren are in the process of seemingly going through an amicable divorce and custody battle. As she is a psychotherapist who does not speak Italian level well enough to work in Bari, she is a full-time mother to their children, Bianca and Giovanni. In their divorce negotiations, both bring up major problems: Pietro's gambling debt and Elena's prescription medication abuse.

Pietro takes the children for the weekend while Elena is meant to be away. The estranged couple seem to be amicable, but they have some issues. He takes them on his boat and they run into Nicola, with whom his kids want to interact. This makes Pietro uncomfortable.

Arriving at his country house, Pietro comes face-to-face with his creditor Santo. As he owes 250,000 euros, he is asked to sign over the property in lieu of the payment, but Pietro refuses and asks for more time. That evening, after he had put them to sleep in a far off room, Giovanni comes looking for him as he fears monsters. After Pietro gets him back to sleep, he finishes watching the football match, and then he discovers the kids are gone.

Elena calls as promised to say goodnight to the kids, so Pietro has to tell her they've disappeared. A ransom call comes, demanding 150,000 euros. Elena has arrived, and she insists that he ask Nico for help, as he is his wealthy childhood friend. Nico will give him the money by the morning only if Pietro goes in his boat to Greece and completes a transaction for him that night.

Pietro takes his boat at night to a small island's restaurant, where he must wait until he gets approached. He stays the whole evening and eventually is given a note to head back. As Pietro leaves, two men on jet skis board his boat with a duffel bag. After he orally confirms receipt of the bag, the nervous armed men wave their guns in his face until the cryptocurrency payment is complete.

During his return to Italy, Pietro is forced to seek help from the coast guard. He hides the duffel bag before they board. They get the motor running, but it is not fully functioning and cannot make it back to Bari. As soon as they hit land, Pietro hurries off to catch a bus to Bari with the bag. At Nico's, he is slow to get the cash, and the impatient Pietro punches him, but he gets the money.

Rushing to Elena's, Pietro finds the kids safe, initially not remembering that they had been having a sleepover at his place. Elena reacts as if she has no idea about the children being missing or the drug run Nico had sent him on to pay the ransom. Insisting Pietro is acting crazy, she threatens to call the police if he doesn't leave.

As he's heading back to his country house, Pietro receives a recording Elena made of him admitting to the drug run to Greece, blackmailing him to ensure he authorizes her taking Bianca and Giovanni to New York. Finding his kids at their riding lesson, they finally remember some details of having stayed in his house. Back at his house, he finds a discarded medication wrapper. Pietro hurries to Elena's apartment and the guard lets him in under the guise of seeking a forgotten passport. Finding the evidence he was seeking, Elena's Oxycodone missing a corner, he pieces together what happened.

Meeting Elena and the kids at the airport, Pietro takes her aside. Pietro makes her realize that he knows that she drugged their kids and took them herself as he watched the match on TV. Pietro insists that she fly alone, or he will have the children drug tested as evidence against her. Elena confesses, but blames him for being inflexible over custody.

Pietro takes the kids to the house. As they horse around in the living room, he calls Santo to collect the 150,000 euros, then sees Elena outside.

== Cast ==
- Riccardo Scamarcio as Pietro Torre
- Annabelle Wallis as Elena Walgren
- Massimiliano Gallo as Nicola
- Gaia Coletti as Bianca
- Lorenzo Ferrante as Giovanni

== Reception ==
On the review aggregator website Rotten Tomatoes, 43% of 7 critics' reviews are positive, with an average rating of 4.6/10.
