= Starbright (film) =

- Theatrical release poster
- Directed by: Francesco Lucente
- Written by: Joseph Bitonti; Olimpia Lucente
- Produced by: Francesco Lucente
- Starring: John Rhys-Davies; Diego Boneta; Alexandra Dowling; Ted Levine; Becky Ann Baker; Gbenga Akinnagbe; Tom Carey; John Westley; Christine Ebersole
- Cinematography: Francesco Di Giacomo
- Edited by: Julia Furch
- Music by: Ludek Drizhal
- Production companies: Ruby Max Entertainment; Lucente Filmed Entertainment
- Distributed by: Ruby Max Entertainment
- Release date: February 27, 2026 (United States)
- Running time: 148 minutes
- Country: United States
- Language: English

Starbright is a 2026 American fantasy film directed by Francesco Lucente and written by Joseph Bitonti and Olimpia Lucente. The film stars John Rhys-Davies, Diego Boneta, Alexandra Dowling, Ted Levine, Becky Ann Baker, Gbenga Akinnagbe, Tom Carey, and John Westley. The plot follows a young woman who discovers a fallen star and must protect it from dark forces that wish to exploit its power.

The film had a prolonged development; it was originally announced in 2010 with different casting before undergoing significant changes. Starbright was released in the United States on February 27, 2026, by Ruby Max Entertainment.

== Plot ==
On a weathered farm at the edge of a fading small town, Aisling (Alexandra Dowling), a young orphan, lives with her grandparents, Bud (Ted Levine), and Teresa (Becky Ann Baker). She yearns for adventure and romance.

One night, under the shadow of an eclipse, the sky splits open and a star falls to earth landing in the field of Aisling's farm. She leaves the house to check the landing site. A tiny star rests in a crater. It sparks and glows brilliantly.

Raphael (John Rhys-Davies), an archangel, appears. He places the living star into a locket at Aisling’s heart. Entrusted with the star's fragile, living light, Aisling becomes his unlikely guardian.

Aisling and Raphael are forced to run from the farmhouse, pursued by three ruthless criminals, Peter (Gbenga Akinnagbe), Martin (Tom Carey), and Nick (John Westley), who witnessed the star fall and a spark that turned a lead pipe into gold.

During their escape, Aisling and Raphael are rescued by Joshua (Diego Boneta).

== Cast ==
- John Rhys-Davies as Raphael
- Diego Boneta as Joshua
- Alexandra Dowling as Aisling
- Ted Levine as Bud
- Becky Ann Baker as Teresa
- Gbenga Akinnagbe as Peter
- Elisabeth Röhm as Zelda
- Christine Ebersole as Grace
- Tom Carey as Martin
- John Westley as Nick
- Gary Grubbs as Nick
- Lance E. Nichols as Robert

== Production ==
=== Development ===
The project was initially announced in October 2010 as a "3D fantasy fairytale adventure." At that time, it was reported that Irish actress Sarah Bolger had been cast in the lead role, with James Earl Jones attached to play the role of the archangel Raphael.

However, the film entered a lengthy period of development. When the film began production the cast had been changed, with Alexandra Dowling taking over the lead female role and John Rhys-Davies replacing James Earl Jones as Raphael.

=== Filming ===
Principal photography took place in various locations in the US, Canada and parts of Europe, utilizing both practical locations and visual effects to create the film's fantasy aesthetic. The cinematography was handled by Francesco Di Giacomo.

== Release ==
Starbright was released in theaters in the United States on February 27, 2026. The film is distributed by Ruby Max Entertainment. Marketing for the film emphasized its "modern fable" qualities and the return of John Rhys-Davies to the high fantasy genre.

== Reception ==
=== Box office ===
The film will begin its wide release theatrical run on February 27, 2026. Industry projections track the film for a moderate to good opening weekend.

=== Critical response ===
Early promotional material received mixed responses, with some critics praising the nostalgic 1980s fantasy tone. Collider described the trailer as "a heartfelt modern fable about courage, hope, and rediscovering the light within."
