= Come and Find Me =

2016 film by Zack Whedon

- Theatrical release poster
- Directed by: Zack Whedon
- Written by: Zack Whedon
- Produced by: Leon Clarance; Chris Ferguson; Brian Kavanaugh-Jones
- Starring: Aaron Paul; Annabelle Wallis; Enver Gjokaj; Garret Dillahunt
- Cinematography: Sean Stiegemeier
- Edited by: Greg Ng
- Music by: Nate Walcott
- Production companies: Automatik; Oddfellows Entertainment; Motion Picture Capital
- Distributed by: Saban Films
- Release date: November 11, 2016 (United States)
- Running time: 112 minutes
- Country: United States
- Language: English
- Box office: $4,052

Come and Find Me is a 2016 American drama film directed and written by Zack Whedon in his feature debut. The film stars Aaron Paul, Annabelle Wallis, Enver Gjokaj and Garret Dillahunt.

The film was released in a limited release and through video on demand on November 11, 2016, by Saban Films.

== Plot ==
When two people, David and Claire, leave a bus at the same stop, David follows Claire. She accuses him of stalking her. It is soon revealed that they are role playing and that they live together as boyfriend and girlfriend. One day, Claire suddenly disappears. After contacting her friends and workplace, David goes to the police. Detective Sloan can offer little hope beyond posting missing person flyers.

A year later, Claire's friend Buck shows up. While they are out discussing Claire, David drunkenly insists Buck dare him to jump from a ledge. The next morning, Buck says he must make a flight that afternoon, and David allows Buck to stay at his apartment while he runs errands. Instead, David rides the bus through the city, reminiscing about Claire. The bus driver forces him off the bus at the last stop, and David returns home early. David surprises Buck, who has trashed the apartment while searching for something. Buck knocks David unconscious and leaves.

After David contacts the police, Detective Sloan agrees to look into Buck and Claire. Looking for clues Buck may have missed, David finds a hidden cache of pictures, which leads him to a junkyard. While exploring it and questioning employees, he draws the attention of a man in a back room. Although initially friendly, he demands to know why David has come to his store to look for a missing person. When David does not answer to his satisfaction, the man tortures him with an electric prod. Finally satisfied, the man releases David and says he may not like what he finds.

That night, a man named Aleksandr breaks into David's home. After subduing Aleksandr, David learns he is a mobster based at the junkyard, who has been dispatched to learn more about David. Aleksandr says Claire killed his brother, and he intends to kill her if he finds her. Before David can finish interrogating Aleksandr, Detective Sloan comes to David's door. Sloan says his investigation into Claire and Buck has revealed that neither are who they say they are, having found no evidence to corroborate the backstories that they had told David. Sloan suggests Claire is troubled and advises David to forget about her.

Questioning Aleksandr further leads David to search Vancouver for clues, though Aleksandr says the mob will be looking for him now. In Vancouver, David questions a businessman's widow after finding his face among Claire's pictures. It turns up nothing, but a car begins following David, who panics and flees into the woods. A man chases him on foot, and David launches a surprise attack on him, crippling him. The SUV stops him before he can flee further and takes him to see Hall, who introduces himself as a U.S. government official. He tells David that Claire was an assassin for his organization and that she was killed shortly after she disappeared from David's life. Hall presents photographic evidence of Claire's death and asks David to stop researching her, saying the businessman's death was an assassination by Claire, and exposing her past could endanger David.

David initially agrees to stop but becomes suspicious of Hall. Catching on, Hall announces he can no longer allow David to leave. David causes the SUV to crash and escapes. In the police station, David spots a missing person photo of Claire under a different name and contacts a man who leads him to Buck, who is now going under the name Kyle. David leads Buck, Alexandr, and Hall all to the same meeting spot. While Hall's and Alexandr's men fight, David abducts Buck and demands he and Hall leave him alone. Buck rejects his demands, saying that David does not understand what kind of mess he has gotten himself into.

Hall immediately afterward takes him hostage. While David is being tortured for the location of Claire's pictures, someone breaks into Hall's warehouse and kills the guards. The assailant is revealed to be Claire. Claire and David return to their house to retrieve Claire's pictures, which she explains is evidence that Hall is a double agent. Before they can leave, however, Alexandr and Hall arrive outside. Both of them surround the house with armed attackers. Realizing that the situation is hopeless, David and Claire resign themselves to going out in a blaze of glory. They start a countdown for their final assault, then a flashback of happier times as a couple is shown.

== Cast ==
- Aaron Paul as David Larraine
- Annabelle Wallis as Claire Collins
- Garret Dillahunt as John Hall-Breyer
- Zachary Knighton as Charlie Eckhart
- Enver Gjokaj as Alexandr Nowzick
- Dean Redman as Jackson MacArthur
- Michael Kopsa as Rezart
- Chris Chalk as Buck Cameron / Kyle MacArthur
- Artine Brown as Detective Gill Ruxin
- Terry Chen as Detective Chris Sloan

== Production ==
Zack Whedon's script Come and Find Me appeared on the 2012 Black List of un-produced scripts. On June 18, 2015, it was announced that Aaron Paul would next star as David in the drama which Whedon would be making his directorial debut. Brian Kavanaugh-Jones would produce through Automatik Entertainment along with Chris Ferguson via Oddfellows Entertainment. Motion Picture Capital would finance the film, while its Leon Clarance would also be the producer. On June 22, 2015, Annabelle Wallis joined the film to play the role of Claire. On July 22, 2015, Garret Dillahunt also signed on to star in the film to play the girl's former handler with the government.

Principal photography on the film began on July 27, 2015, in Vancouver, British Columbia. Filming ended on August 28, 2015.

== Release ==
In May 2016, Saban Films acquired the U.S. distribution rights to the film. The film was released in a limited release and through video on demand on November 11, 2016.

== Reception ==
=== Box office ===
Come and Find Me grossed $4,052 worldwide, and $25,513 with home video sales.

=== Critical response ===
On review aggregator Rotten Tomatoes, the film holds an approval rating of 62%, based on 13 reviews, with an average rating of 5.32/10. On Metacritic, the film has a weighted average score of 46 out of 100, based on 7 critics, indicating "mixed or average" reviews.
