= Catwalk Dogs =

2007 British television film

- Opening Credits Title
- Created by: Maureen Chadwick; Ann McManus
- Written by: Simon Nye
- Directed by: Tim Sullivan
- Starring: Kris Marshall
- Country of origin: United Kingdom

Production
- Producer: Spencer Campbell
- Running time: 90 minutes

Original release
- Network: ITV
- Release: 21 October 2007

Catwalk Dogs is a British television film written by Simon Nye and produced by Shed Productions for ITV. It stars Kris Marshall and Georgia Mackenzie and was first shown on 21 October 2007. Filming took place between 17 and 24 June in Teddington.

== Plot ==
Catwalk Dogs is the story of Sally and Michael a couple who are coping with the trauma of miscarriage. The day Michael brings home pedigree puppy Archie it changes their lives forever. Archie is a Wire haired Fox Terrier.

With their relationship wavering under the emotional stress, Sally decides to leave Michael. As a bolt hole she moves in next door to her new-found doggie friend, Guy and his formidable mother, dog show judge and Rottweiler breeder, Mrs Jessop.

Michael goes to pieces when Sally leaves, losing his job and self-respect. He turns to Archie for solace and man's best friend leads him to the disparate but caring members of a local dog club who just might be able to help him win back Sally.

He then does.

== Cast ==
- Kris Marshall as Michael
- Georgia Mackenzie as Sally
- Dominic Rowan as Guy
- Diana Quick as Guy's mother
- Dave Lamb as Colin
- Rose Keegan as Jilly
- Kevin Horkin as himself, Pet Expert

== Reception ==
Catwalk Dogs had a rating of 4,920,000 viewers and ranked at #20 on ITV.
