= Nick Sidi =

English actor (born 1966)

Nicholas Sidi
- Born: 22 February 1966 (age 60); Manchester, Lancashire, England
- Occupation: Actor
- Spouse: Marianne Elliott (m. 2002)
- Children: 1

Nick Sidi (born 22 February 1966) is an English actor. He is the husband of Marianne Elliott and son-in-law of actress Rosalind Knight. He often plays drama or comedy roles on television and frequently appears in BBC dramas.

== Acting credits ==
Film
Year	Title	Role	Director
2006	Scenes of a Sexual Nature	Ludo	Ed Blum
2009	The Scouting Book for Boys	Patrick	Tom Harper
2011	Season of the Witch	Priest in Villach	Dominic Sena
2011	Mercenaries	Dragan	Paris Leonti
2017	The Death of Stalin	NKVD Officer Kobulov	Armando Iannucci

Television
Year	Title	Role	Notes
1996	This Life	Solicitor	Episode: "Happy Families"
1998	Coronation Street	Stuart Hamilton	Episodes #4370, #4374 & #4376
1998	Cold Feet	Neil	Episode #1.5
1999	City Central	Ben Holland	Episode: "The Grace of God"
1999	Passion Killers	George	Television film
1999	Jesus	Young Zealot	Television film
2000	Casualty	Nick Costello	Episodes: "Getting to Know You" & "Too Tight to Mention"
2001	Murder in Mind	Graham Oakes	Episode: "Mercy"
2001	Bob & Rose	Leo McKenzie	Episode #1.1
2002	Clocking Off	Sam Davidson	Series 3-4
2002	The Stretford Wives	Paul Simmons	
2003	Trust	Sammy Samuelson	All 6 episodes
2003	The Bill	John Rutherford	Episodes: "In High Demand" & "Ruthless"
2004	EastEnders	Dr Bamford	8 episodes
2004	No Angels	Jack Gardner	Episode #1.2
2004	Blue Murder	Tim	Episode: "Lonely"
2004	Holby City	Joe Paynter	Episode: "Elf and Happiness"
2005	Wire in the Blood	Dave Andrews	Episode: "Bad Seed"
2005	Silent Witness	DCI Wimber	Episode: "The Meaning of Death"
2005	Bodies	Ben Hill	Episodes #2.4, #2.5, #2.7, #2.9 & #2.10
2006	Hotel Babylon	Mr Lawrence	Episode #1.6
2006	The Catherine Tate Show	Man with Derek Faye	
2006	Vincent	Stephen Knight	Episode: "The Bodies Beneath"
2007	Waterloo Road	Roger Aspinall	Series 2
2007	Empathy	Robert Evans (murdered girl's father)	
2008	The Last Enemy	Professor John Moreton	
2008	Love Soup	Tom	Episode: "Sophisticated Lady"
2008	Pulling	Justin	Episode #2.5
2008	Consuming Passion: 100 Years of Mills & Boon	Nick	
2009	New Tricks	Brother Mark	Episode: "The War Against Drugs"
2009	Trinity	Richard Arc	Episodes #1.1 & #1.8
2009	The Thick of It	Martin Stone (Headmaster)	Series 3: Episode 4
2010	Hustle	Clifford Davies	Episode: "The Thieving Mistake"
2010	Ashes to Ashes	Graham McClean	Episode #3.2
2010	Alice	Man with Rabbit Feet	
2010	The IT Crowd	Lawyer	Episode: "Reynholm vs Reynholm" "Douglas and Divorce"
2010	Excluded	Peter	
2010	Spooks	Russian Ambassador	Episode #9.3
2010	Psychoville	Adrian	Episode: "Psychoville Halloween Special"
2011	Marchlands	Father Boyle	Episode #1.2 & #1.4
2011	Lewis	Stephen Blackmore	Episode: "Wild Justice"
2011	Sugartown	Ken	Episode #1.1
2011–2015	DCI Banks	Chief Superintendent Ron McLaughlin	
2012	National Theatre Live	Roger Shears and: Duty Sergeant; Mr. Wise; Man behind Counter; Drunk One; Voice Two	Play: The Curious Incident of the Dog in the Night-Time
2012	The Secret of Crickley Hall	Reverend Andrew	
2013	The Heart Fails Without Warning	Father	
2014	Rev.	George	Episode #3.4
2014	Grantchester	DCI Jacob Williams	Episode #1.5
2015	Inspector George Gently	Scott Parker	Episode: "Gently Among Friends"
2015	A.D. The Bible Continues	Ananias of Damascus	Episode: "The Road to Damascus"
2016	Silent Witness	Simon Forsyth	Episode: "River’s Edge"
2017	Prime Suspect 1973	Andrew Tennison	

=== Theatre ===
Date	Title	Role	Director	Theatre
3 May 2007 – 19 May 2007	Taking Care of Baby	Martin MacAuliffe	Anthony Clark	The Door, Birmingham Repertory Theatre
June 2007	Taking Care of Baby	Martin MacAuliffe	Anthony Clark	Hampstead Theatre, London
16 April 2008	Harper Regan	Seth Regan	Marianne Elliott	National Theatre
25 October 2011	13	Dennis	Thea Sharrock	Olivier Theatre, National Theatre
2 August 2012 – 27 October 2012	The Curious Incident of the Dog in the Night-Time	Roger Shears and: Duty Sergeant; Mr. Wise; Man behind Counter; Drunk One; Voice Two	Marianne Elliott	Cottesloe Theatre, National Theatre
12 March 2013 – 19 December 2013	The Curious Incident of the Dog in the Night-Time	Roger Shears and: Duty Sergeant; Mr. Wise; Man behind Counter; Drunk One; Voice Two	Marianne Elliott	Apollo Theatre
