= Rose Keegan =

British actress

- Education: Royal Central School of Speech and Drama
- Occupation: Actress
- Parents: Sir John Keegan (father); Susanne Keegan (mother)
- Website: http://rosekeegan.com/

Rose Keegan is a British actress of stage, film, and television. She trained at the Royal Central School of Speech and Drama. Her mother is the writer Susanne Keegan. Her father was the writer and military historian Sir John Keegan.

== Selected credits ==
=== Theatre ===
- Susan in Abigail's Party by Mike Leigh directed by Sarah Esdaile - ATG Tour
- Susan in Abigail's Party by Mike Leigh directed by Sarah Esdaile - Theatre Royal Bath/Tour
- Andy in Stepping Out by Richard Harris directed by Maria Friedman - Theatre Royal Bath/Tour
- Cunegonde in Candide, at the Gate Theatre, directed by David Farr
- Linda in A Message for the Brokenhearted, at Liverpool Playhouse/BAC, written by Gregory Motton and directed by Ramin Gray
- Norma in The Revengers' Comedies, at the Strand Theatre, written and directed by Sir Alan Ayckbourn
- Susannah in Bedroom Farce, Aldwych Theatre, written by Sir Alan Ayckbourn and directed by Loveday Ingram
- Model Girl in The Ghost is Here, New National Theatre, Tokyo, directed by Kazuyoshi Kushida
- Lana in Hushabye Mountain, at the Hampstead Theatre, written by Jonathan Harvey, directed by Paul Miller
- Comedy Satire and Deeper Meaning at The Gate Theatre written by Gregory Motton and directed by David Farr
- The Countess in The Beelzebub Sonata at The Gate Theatre directed by Duncan Ward

=== Film ===
- Hope Gap, written and directed by William Nicholson
- Thunderbirds, directed by Jonathan Frakes
- Match Point, directed by Woody Allen
- Magicians, directed by Andrew O'Connor
- The Mirror Crack'd
- Harry Potter and the Deathly Hallows – Part 1

=== Television ===
- Catwalk Dogs (ITV1),
- Lilies (BBC One),
- Hearts and Bones (BBC One),
- Gimme Gimme Gimme (BBC Two),
- Black Books (Channel 4),
- Miss Marple (BBC One).
