= TLC (TV series) =

Darkly surreal farcical sitcom (2002)

- Genre: Sitcom
- Written by: Fintan Coyle
- Directed by: Geoff Posner
- Starring: Reece Shearsmith; Alexander Armstrong; Georgia Mackenzie; Benedict Wong; Richard Griffiths; Tim Brooke-Taylor
- Country of origin: United Kingdom
- Original language: English
- No. of series: 1
- No. of episodes: 6

Production
- Producers: Geoff Posner; David Tyler; Jed Leventhall
- Cinematography: Rob Kitzmann
- Editor: Mark Wybourn
- Production company: Pozzitive Productions

Original release
- Network: BBC Two
- Release: 11 November – 16 December 2002

TLC (stylized tlc) is a darkly surreal farce-like sitcom set in a fictional NHS hospital called South Middlesex. Written by Fintan Coyle, co-creator of hit game show Weakest Link, it was first broadcast on the BBC on 11 November 2002 and ran over six episodes until 16 December. There were some very mixed opinions on the show among both critics and viewers, but it achieved decent ratings and featured an excellent comedy cast including Richard Griffiths, Alexander Armstrong and The League of Gentlemen's Reece Shearsmith. The series was released on DVD in the UK on 29 October 2007.

== Characters ==
Dr Laurence Flynn (Played by Reece Shearsmith): A very unfortunate young Surgical House Officer who's only just started his job at the hospital. He's still haunted by the fact that he failed his final medical exams first time round (something his co-workers will never let him forget) and is determined to redeem himself. He is neurotic, clumsy, lacking in self-confidence and generally just not cut out for his job, and, unfortunately for him, is not at all popular among the other staff at the hospital despite his best efforts to befriend them. As a result, the staff play a lot of very cruel and often sadistic practical jokes on him, (such as fooling him into trying to revive a dead patient, getting him sectioned under the mental health act, and giving him jabs for no reason at all) and poor Dr Flynn ends up teetering on the edge of sanity for most of the series. He often suffers from lack of sleep and ends up seeing and doing some very strange things as a result. He is madly in love with nurse Judy.

Dr Stephen Noble (Played by Alexander Armstrong): A Surgical Registrar at the hospital and Dr Laurence's mentor. He is Flynn's only friend and the two seem quite close, but he actually enjoys playing jokes on Flynn just as much as everyone else does, and even sets up a few himself. Dr Noble enjoys being a doctor, but he is endlessly cynical by nature. He sometimes gets blamed for screw-ups during surgery but manages to shift the blame onto the hapless Dr Flynn. He too suffers from lack of sleep and is addicted to coffee.

Nurse Judy Conway (Played by Georgia Mackenzie): An attractive Staff Nurse who stands guard over the precious coffee with her fellow nurses. She is very cool and level-headed, and can seem quite caring towards others, but she has a malicious side with a cruel sense of humour. She is fully aware of Dr Flynn's crush on her and often uses it to take advantage of him—delighting in making him the object of ridicule in front of others.

Nurse Terry Cheung (Played by Benedict Wong): An openly gay Theatre Nurse who rooms with Nurse Judy. Although Nurse Terry doesn't instigate any of the practical jokes on Dr Flynn, he is almost always a willing participant.

Gasman (Played by Erich Redman): A creepy German anaesthetist who works in the surgical ward of the hospital. He has a pain fetish and is genuinely obsessed with the idea of making others suffer as much as possible, meaning he is not particularly good at his job. His only real goal in life is to torture both his patients and his co-workers whenever he can.

Mr Benedict Ron (Played by Richard Griffiths): The hospital's director of surgery. He is a good-natured guy who's always kind to his patients but is an embarrassingly bad surgeon. He always gets away with his failed operations anyway, usually by blaming someone else.

Sister Charity Hope (Played by Llewella Gideon): The Ward Sister who is pretty much the only completely sane person in the hospital. She is a mother to all, likes to keep things under control, and wears gallstones as earrings.

Sid (Played by Tom Watt): The hospital porter, who is deadly slow at everything he does. He is not very good at what he does but is quite a good-natured guy, and has a secret crush on Sister Charity Hope.

Wheelchair Guy (Played by Martin Trenaman): An unlucky man who seems to permanently reside in the hospital. His legs don't normally work but he is almost cured every episode... Unluckily for him something also happens that stops the healing process each episode. The nurses don't seem too bothered by his plight. He eventually heals and leaves the hospital, but has an accident on a miniscooter soon afterwards.

Tim Brooke-Taylor also had a role as a surgeon who had a nervous breakdown and was only allowed back in the hospital as the Hospital Chaplain and who now constantly wants to try to operate on patients and is puzzled as to why God allows suffering.

== DVD release ==
The series was released on DVD in 2007. Aspect ratio is 16:9 and region is 2. There are no extra features.
