= Alexandra Dowling =

English actress (born 1990)

- Born: 22 May 1990 (age 36); Falmouth, Cornwall, England
- Occupation: Actress
- Years active: 2012–present

Alexandra Dowling (born 22 May 1990) is an Irish actress best known for her lead role as Queen Anne in the BBC One historical action drama series The Musketeers, which is based on the characters in The Three Musketeers by Alexandre Dumas. She is also known for her guest starring role as Roslin Frey in HBO's Game of Thrones.

== Early life ==
In 2012, Dowling graduated from Oxford School of Drama with a Diploma in Professional Acting.

== Career ==
In 2012, Dowling made her television debut in "The Drawing of the Dark", the eleventh episode of the final series of the BBC fantasy drama series Merlin, as a druid girl named Kara. She also appeared in the music video for "Love Is All I Got" by Feed Me and Crystal Fighters.

Dowling guest starred in "The Rains of Castamere", the ninth episode of the third season of HBO's television series Game of Thrones as Roslin Frey. She also appeared in "Elephants Can Remember" in the thirteenth series of ITV's Agatha Christie's Poirot, adapted from Agatha Christie's novel of the same name. This episode was aired on 9 June 2013, and also starred Zoë Wanamaker, Vanessa Kirby and David Suchet.

Dowling played the character Agnes in the action film Hammer of the Gods, also starring James Cosmo. The film is directed by Farren Blackburn and was released on 5 July 2013.

She is known for her role as Queen Anne in the BBC One drama series The Musketeers, based on Alexandre Dumas's novel The Three Musketeers,

Dowling portrayed Bertha in Joshua Stamp-Simon's stage adaption of St. John Emile Clavering Hankin's The Last of the De Mullins, which opened at Jermyn Street Theatre, London on 5 February and ended on 28 February 2015.

== Filmography ==
Films
Year	Title	Role	Notes
2013	Hammer of the Gods	Agnes	
2021	Itch	Sister Agatha	
2022	Emily	Charlotte Brontë	
2023	Falling Into Place	Emily	
2026	Starbright	Aisling	
TBA	The Silence of Mercy	TBA	Upcoming film

Television
Year	Title	Role	Notes
2012	Merlin	Kara	Episode: "The Drawing of the Dark"
2013	Game of Thrones	Roslin Frey	Episode: "The Rains of Castamere"
2013	Agatha Christie's Poirot	Marie McDermott	Episode: "Elephants Can Remember"
2014–16	The Musketeers	Queen Anne	Main cast
2023	The Doll Factory	Sylvia	2 episodes
2024	Sweetpea	Seren	3 episodes

Theatre
Year	Title	Role	Theatre
2015	The Last of the De Mullins	Bertha	Jermyn Street Theatre
2016	I Have Been Here Before	Janet Ormund	Jermyn Street Theatre
2016	While The Sun Shines	Lady Elizabeth	Theatre Royal Bath
2017	A Lie of the Mind	Beth	Southwark Playhouse
2018	Richard III and Romeo & Juliet	Lady Anne and Juliet	Shakespeare's Rose Theatre
2019	Vassa	Lipa	Almeida Theatre
