= The Silence of Mercy =

- Directed by: Floria Sigismondi
- Written by: Chris Basler
- Produced by: Payam Shohadai; Franklin Leonard; Marc Joubert; Steven Squillante
- Starring: Agnes Born; Raffey Cassidy; Alexandra Dowling; Annabelle Wallis
- Cinematography: Martin Ahlgren
- Edited by: Herbert Dwight Raymond IV
- Production companies: Luma Features; Wild Atlantic Pictures; The Black List Production
- Country: United States
- Language: English

The Silence of Mercy is an upcoming American independent drama film directed by Floria Sigismondi and written by Chris Basler.

== Cast ==
- Agnes Born as Roslyn
- Raffey Cassidy as Arild
- Alexandra Dowling
- Annabelle Wallis

== Production ==
In January 2019, Chris Basler's screenplay The Enclosed was one of ten included on the first GLAAD List, a joint venture between GLAAD and The Black List showcasing "the most promising unmade LGBTQ-inclusive scripts in Hollywood". On December 11, 2020, it was announced that Floria Sigismondi would direct the film, now titled The Silence of Mercy, with Annabelle Wallis starring. In March 2021, Agnes Born joined the cast of the film.

Principal photography took place from February 25 to April 15, 2021, in Ireland.
