= The Blind Date (TV series) =

- Genre: Crime drama
- Created by: Frances Fyfield
- Written by: Simon Booker
- Directed by: Nigel Douglas
- Starring: Zara Turner; Mark Letheren; Hazel Ellerby; Peter Wight; Samantha Beckinsale; Ben Miller; Regina Freedman; Roger Morlidge
- Composer: Hal Lindes
- Country of origin: United Kingdom
- Original language: English
- No. of series: 1
- No. of episodes: 2

Production
- Executive producers: Laura Mackie; Jo Wright
- Producer: Alison Davis
- Cinematography: Sean Van Hales
- Editor: Nigel Cattle
- Running time: 90 minutes
- Production company: LWT

Original release
- Network: ITV
- Release: 13 March – 20 March 2000

The Blind Date is a British television crime drama television series, written by Simon Booker, that first broadcast on ITV between 13 and 20 March 2000. The series, based upon the novel by Frances Fyfield, follows Lucy Kennedy (Zara Turner), a former police detective whose sister was murdered, and after a plot to ‘honey trap’ the prime suspect for the murder goes horribly wrong, Lucy's memories of the traumatic incident are revived when a friend of hers goes on a horrific blind date with the suspected killer.

The series co-starred Mark Letheren, Hazel Ellerby, Peter Wight and Ben Miller, and was filmed in and around Highgate, Archway and Muswell Hill. The first episode drew 8.63 million viewers, while episode two drew just over 8 million. The series was released on VHS on 27 March 2000, alongside a fellow Miller-fronted ITV drama, Passion Killers. This remains the only home video release to date.

== Cast ==
- Zara Turner as Lucy Kennedy
- Mark Letheren as Jack De Souza
- Hazel Ellerby as DCI Anthea Cooper
- Peter Wight as DI Harry Jenkins
- Samantha Beckinsale as Patty
- Ben Miller as Joe Maxwell
- Regina Freedman as Angela
- Roger Morlidge as John 'Owl' Jones
- Mark Aiken as Michael Smythe
- Maureen O'Brien as Mrs. Smythe
- Joanna David as Diana Kennedy
- Matthew James Thomas as Matthew Davey
- Michael Elwyn as Gordon
