= Loughton incinerator thefts =

1988–1992 bank incinerator thefts in England

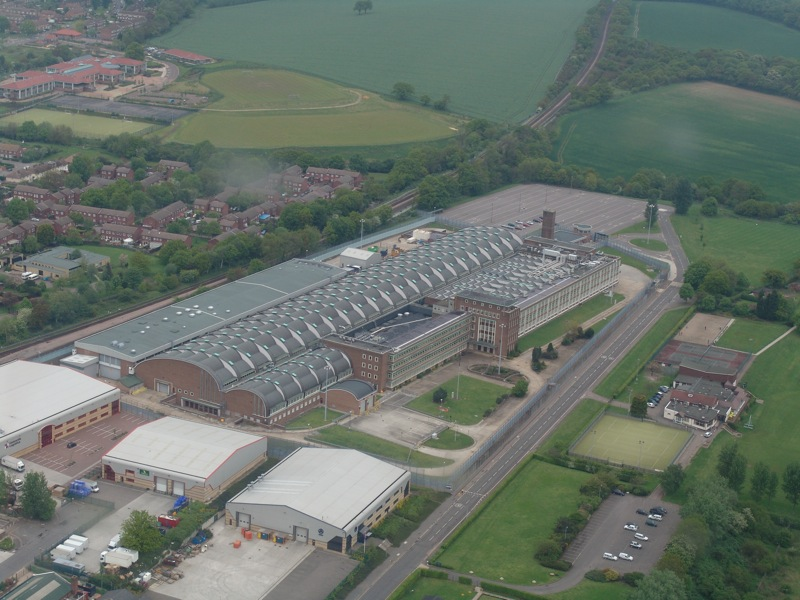
- The Bank of England Printing Works, where the thefts took place
- Date: c. April 1988 – c. March 1992
- Location: Loughton, Essex; 51.6487°N 0.0905°E
- Participants: Christine Gibson; Peter Gibson; Kenneth Longman; Janet Longman; Michael Nairne; Sharon Nairne; Kevin Winwright
- Outcome: Between £600,000–£700,000 stolen
- Verdict: Guilty
- Convictions: Winwright sentenced to 18 months in prison; remaining participants ordered to repay £500,000 to the bank

The Loughton incinerator thefts occurred between 1988 and 1992 at the Bank of England's incinerator plant at Debden in Loughton, Essex – four employees of the plant stole more than £600,000 in a series of regular thefts. The four participants and their spouses were arrested in 1992, with only one being prosecuted in criminal court. In a civil suit, the remaining members of the group were ordered to repay half a million pounds to the bank. The story of the case has been adapted into two feature-length films.

== Thefts ==
Between 1988 and 1992, four employees of the Bank of England's incinerator plant at Debden in Loughton, Essex, conspired to steal around £600,000 in banknotes that were due to be destroyed, in a series of thefts. They changed padlocks on locked doors in order to be able to steal from piles of notes which had been taken out of circulation. One participant, Christine Gibson, smuggled the notes out of the plant by stuffing them into her underwear. Gibson initially worked in collaboration with just two other employees, Kenneth Longman and Michael Nairne, before the trio were approached and joined by a fourth individual, Kevin Winwright, who acted as their "look-out" and distracted the guards. During this time, the group and their spouses lived a "life of Riley", spending their gains on expensive cars, motorcycles and jewellery.

== Arrest and trial ==
The criminal gang was brought to the attention of the police after Gibson's husband, Peter, attempted to make a deposit of £100,000 at the Ilford branch of the Reliance Mutual Insurance Society entirely in £20 and £50 notes. Nairne also attempted to make a deposit of £30,000 at the same branch. All four colleagues and their respective partners were soon arrested, but only Winwright was prosecuted – he admitted to stealing £170,000 from the plant and received an 18-month prison sentence.

The six remaining participants were then sued by the Bank of England at the High Court of Justice in April 1994. The civil case, Bank of England v Gibson, was overseen by Judge Norman Rudd, with Winwright giving evidence on behalf of the bank. After a two-week trial, Rudd delivered his judgment on 26 April 1994, ordering the three families to repay more than half a million pounds to the bank. As no witnesses who had given evidence in the High Court were willing to speak to the police, all three couples escaped criminal convictions. The Bank of England finally closed the case in 2018.

== Film adaptations ==
The story of the thefts was adapted into two films: first in 2001 as Hot Money, a television movie made for ITV starring Caroline Quentin, then again as Mad Money, a 2008 film based on ITV's production, starring Diane Keaton.

== Similar crime ==
A similar crime was committed in 2000, when two bank clerks stole 110 sacks of notes valued at £23,000 that were due to be incinerated – the two participants were sent to prison for six and nine months.

== See also ==
- List of heists in the United Kingdom
