= Passion Killers (film) =

- Cover of the double-headed VHS release with The Blind Date
- Genre: Comedy drama Detective fiction
- Written by: Charles Peattie; Mark Warren
- Directed by: David Evans
- Starring: Ben Miller; Georgia Mackenzie; Helen Grace; Nicholas Sidi; Michael Simkins; Sidney Livingstone
- Composer: Mark Russell
- Country of origin: United Kingdom

Production
- Executive producers: Christine Langan; Andy Harries
- Producer: Rob Bullock
- Running time: 50 minutes
- Production company: Granada Television

Original release
- Network: ITV
- Release: 3 April 1999

Passion Killers is a British television comedy drama film, written by Charles Peattie and Mark Warren, that first broadcast on ITV on 3 April 1999. The film follows the work of a detective agency whose clients hire them to expose their cheating husbands and wives. The film stars Ben Miller and Georgia Mackenzie as partners Nick and Kim, who after running the agency together, find themselves engaging in an unexpected romance.

The film was directed by David Evans, with Andy Harries acting an executive producer alongside Christine Langan. Helen Grace, Nicholas Sidi, Michael Simkins and Sidney Livingstone co-starred in the film alongside Miller and McKenzie. Although exact viewing figures are unconfirmed, the film drew less than 6.04 million, registering outside the Top 30 most watched programmes that week. The film was released on VHS on 27 March 2000, alongside a fellow Miller-fronted ITV drama, The Blind Date. This remains the only home video release to date.

== Plot ==
Kim (Georgia Mackenzie) decides to set up a detective agency to help people whose spouses are cheating on them after her own husband leaves her. She decides she requires the help of a man for the cases where it's the women who are two-timing and finds a partner in the form of Nick (Ben Miller), who is hardly a Romeo himself. The duo work well together – so well that it seems romance might be about to rear its head when least expected.

== Cast ==
- Ben Miller as Nick
- Georgia Mackenzie as Kim
- Helen Grace as Maggie
- Nicholas Sidi as George
- Michael Simkins as Bill
- Sidney Livingstone as Fred
- James Weber Brown as Joe
- Dido Miles as Michelle
- Clare Bullus as Jasmine
- Emma Amos as Dawn
- Peter McNamara as Riley
- Paul Venables as Ralph
