= Pascal Langdale =

British actor

- Born: Pascal Langlois; London, England, United Kingdom
- Occupation: Actor
- Years active: 1992–present

Pascal Langlois, better known as Pascal Langdale, is an English actor. He has played supporting roles in a number of television dramas since 1999. Langdale also lent his voice and likeness to the critically acclaimed video game Heavy Rain, in which he played Ethan Mars. He studied at the Royal Academy of Dramatic Art for 3 years. Langdale also runs a company "Collective Intent", that assists in facial capture, and Behavior Libraries for video games. Pascal co-wrote and performed in "Faster Than Night", a "Live-animated interactive drama" chosen to be part of Toronto's Harbourfront HATCH 2014 festival.

== Filmography ==
=== Films ===
| Year | Film | Role | Notes |
|---|---|---|---|
| 2004 | The Phantom of the Opera | Flamenco Dancer | |
| 2007 | Super Comet: After The Impact | Noah Boyle | |
| 2007 | Gone for a Dance | Antoine | |
| 2007 | Steel Trap | Robert | |
| 2008 | Sharpe's Peril | Major Joubert | |
| 2008 | Cards on the Table | David | |
| 2009 | Morris: A Life with Bells On | Preston Tannen | |
| 2020 | See For Me | Ernie | |

=== Television ===
| Year | Film | Role | Notes |
|---|---|---|---|
| 1999 | The Scarlet Pimpernel | Armand St. Just | |
| 1999–2000 | Lucy Sullivan Is Getting Married | Daniel | |
| 2001 | Shades | Doug | |
| 2001 | Down to Earth | Alan Walcot | |
| 2003 | Ultimate Force | LeCompte | |
| 2006 | Extras | Mark | |
| 2007 | Discovery 2057 | Alain Degas | |
| 2009 | My Family | Adult Kenzo | |
| 2009 | Free Agents | Doctor Two-Scenes | |
| 2009 | Spooks | Finn Lambert | |
| 2009 | Doctors | Angus Warren | |
| 2010 | Any Human Heart | Dr Roissansac | |
| 2012 | Flashpoint | Dr. Peter Applewhite | |
| 2014-2016 | Bitten | Karl Marsten | Recurring (11 episodes) |
| 2016 | Between | Dexter Crane | |
| 2016-2017 | Killjoys | Liam Jelco | Recurring (6 episodes) |

=== Video games ===
| Year | Title | Role | Notes |
|---|---|---|---|
| 2010 | Heavy Rain | Ethan Mars | Provides voice acting and motion capture |
| 2020 | Watch Dogs: Legion | Bagley / Bradley Larsen | Voice |
| 2020 | Assassin's Creed: Valhalla | Wallace | Voice |

== Other media ==
From 2011 to 2014, Langdale appeared in television advertisements for The National Lottery, playing the role of a millionaire named Hector Riva. The advertisements included him preparing to go to space, him on his private island, him scuba diving off his private yacht, and flying in his private jet. He has also appeared in advertisements for Saint Agur blue cheese.
