= Mad Money (film) =

2008 film by Callie Khouri

- Theatrical release poster
- Directed by: Callie Khouri
- Written by: Glenn Gers
- Produced by: Jay Cohen; James Acheson; Frank DeMartini
- Starring: Diane Keaton; Queen Latifah; Katie Holmes; Ted Danson; Stephen Root; Christopher McDonald; Adam Rothenberg; Roger Cross
- Cinematography: John Bailey
- Edited by: Wendy Greene Bricmont
- Music by: James Newton Howard; Marty Davich
- Production companies: Millennium Films; Lightspeed Media; Swingin' Productions; Big City Pictures; Granada Productions; MMoney; Grand Army Entertainment
- Distributed by: Overture Films
- Release date: January 18, 2008
- Running time: 104 minutes
- Countries: United Kingdom; United States
- Language: English
- Budget: $22 million
- Box office: $26.4 million

Mad Money is a 2008 crime comedy film directed by Callie Khouri and starring Diane Keaton, Queen Latifah, and Katie Holmes. It is loosely based on the 2001 British television film Hot Money.

Released on January 18, 2008, it is the first film to be distributed by Overture Films.

== Plot ==
Bridget Cardigan lives a comfortable upper-middle-class life until her husband Don's position is downsized and he's unable to find a new job. They sink into debt and put their house up for sale. Selina, the Cardigans' housekeeper, confronts Bridget with three bounced paychecks and convinces Bridget to take a job as a janitor at the Federal Reserve Bank of Kansas City. Bridget hatches a scheme to steal worn-out dollar bills earmarked for destruction, and recruits the reluctant Nina Brewster, who operates the dollar bill shredder. In turn they recruit Jackie Truman, the employee who pushes carts full of bills to the shredding room.

Bridget plans to swith locks on a cart when she is cleaning the Treasury Department inspection room and leave the actual lock for Nina in the women's restroom, the only place there is no surveillance cameras. When Jackie pushes the cart, filled with money, she will dump some bills into a trash can out of camera view and return the cart to Nina who will switch the locks back and shred the remaining bills. Bridget can then retrieve the bills, meet in the restroom, and stuff the money into their clothes before leaving at the end of their shift.

When they pull the scheme off, Don is shocked but supportive, and gives advice on how to dispose of the stolen bills. Repeated robberies enable Don and Bridget to pay off their debts and take their house off the market. Nina and Jackie meet their financial goals but Don is shocked when Bridget wants to keep going and Nina and Jackie to continue. Barry Cobb, a security guard who is attracted to Nina, catches on to their scheme, and they cut him in on it. Don invents cover stories for the team members' increasing wealth and they all start living the high life, although they have trouble finding places to hide all the excess bills they are unable to dispose of immediately.

Bridget sees a strange man lurking around at a party at her house, and then she sees him at work. The man turns out to be a federal bank examiner, and he confronts Glover, the bank's manager, with circumstantial evidence of the team's theft, but Glover is too prideful to admit anyone has stolen from his bank. Bridget and her accomplices attempt to get rid of all the bills stashed at their houses, but the police move in before they can all be destroyed. Bridget escapes, but the others are arrested.

Bridget asks her friend Bryce Arbogast to defend them, and even though he is a tax attorney, not a criminal lawyer, he agrees when she offers him a bagful of money. Bryce gets Bridget, Don, Nina, Barry, Jackie, and Jackie's husband, Bob, off the hook for their crimes, because it cannot be proven that the bills found in their homes came from the bank. However, the IRS requires that they pay fines for not paying income tax on the stolen cash, which will wipe out the money that remains. They go back to leading normal lives outside the bank; Nina and Barry get married.

Eight months later, Bridget reveals to Nina and Jackie that she stashed away much of the stolen cash in the basement of a friend's bar but is waiting for the right time to use it to leave the country.

== Cast ==
- Diane Keaton as Bridget Cardigan
- Queen Latifah as Nina Brewster
- Katie Holmes as Jackie Truman
- Ted Danson as Don Cardigan
- Stephen Root as Glover
- Christopher McDonald as Bryce Arbogast
- Adam Rothenberg as Bob Truman
- Roger Cross as Barry Cobb
- Finesse Mitchell as Shaun
- Meagen Fay as Mindy Arbogast
- J. C. MacKenzie as Mandelbrot
- Bryan Massey as Detective Brinkley

== Development ==
=== Original UK version ===
Hot Money (2001), the original UK TV film produced by Granada Television, is based on the true story of three women who worked at the Bank of England and embarked on a plan to steal thousands of pounds of banknotes that were due to be destroyed at the bank's incinerating plant in Essex. No one except these women know the exact details of the theft. In the director's commentary for the Mad Money DVD, director Callie Khouri credits producer Jay Cohen with having brought the TV film to her attention and obtaining the rights to adapt it.

Khouri and Cohen worked for five years to bring a deliberately Americanized version of Hot Money to the screen using various writers. Both Diane Keaton and Queen Latifah were attached early on to the project and writers began designing the characters specifically around the two actresses.

== Release ==
=== Box office ===
The film debuted in fifth place at the box office on its opening day in the United States, with a return of US$2.3 million from 2,470 screens. Reuters referred to this return as a "modest" result for the film's opening day. By the end of its opening weekend, Mad Money had slipped to seventh place, with a weekend take of $7.7 million. Writing for Rotten Tomatoes, Gitesh Pandya noted that the opening weekend per theater revenue "averaged a not-so-impressive $3,126." amNewYork called the film's opening weekend return "a big flop at the box office," and the New Zealand Herald described it as "a box-office flop". The film's four-day take was a dismal $9.2 million. The film also did not fare well in its release in other countries, and Conor Bresnan of Box Office Mojo reported that "Mad Money bombed in its first two markets" overseas. The film grossed $26.4 million worldwide.

=== Critical reception ===
On the review aggregator website Rotten Tomatoes, 22% of 105 critics' reviews are positive, with an average rating of 4.5/10. The website's consensus reads: "A laborious, unfunny and implausible heist film." Metacritic, which uses a weighted average, assigned the film a score of 41 out of 100, based on 31 critics, indicating "mixed or average" reviews.

Roger Ebert gave the film a rating of one and a half stars, and wrote, "The bottom line is, some girls will like it, the men not so much." The film also received one and a half stars in a review in the Chicago Tribune, and Michael Phillips wrote that the film's cast was not to blame: "Do not blame the cast. The cast is game. The dreary visual scheme, however, combines unwell with the pokey, enervated rhythm of the heist scenes, and while I'm neither a medical doctor nor a script doctor, it seems this film could use a few uppers."

The film received three stars in Newsday, and Jan Stuart wrote:"Mad Money is no Rififi, but Khouri and Gers invest it with an individuality and generosity of spirit that lift it into the realm of guiltless pleasure." Bill Wine of All Headline News gave the film two and a half stars, writing "Mad Money is a light and lively, likable low-tech lark. Don't expect big laughs, but you can at least bank on it to hold your interest." The Canadian Press gave the film one and a half stars, and criticized Katie Holmes's performance "While Keaton has long done zany and giddy well, and she and Latifah have an interesting contrast of personalities, Holmes' presence feels like an afterthought." In contrast, Peter Howell of the Toronto Star reviewed the film positively, praising the "exuberance of the cast." The New York Post, The New York Times and Variety also criticized Katie Holmes's performance in the film, and The New York Times called Holmes "the movie's weakest link."

In an article in the Boston Herald titled "Don't waste your Mad Money on poor comedy", Stephen Schaefer gave the film a rating of "C", writing "Even with the legendary Diane Keaton center stage, Mad Money fails to hit the stratosphere of giddy, intoxicating comedy." The film received a critical review in from Claudia Puig in USA Today "Is it the perfect crime? No, it's a particularly imperfect heist comedy that offers little entertainment value and few laughs."
