= Renato De Maria =

Italian film director and screenwriter

- Born: 1958 (age 67–68); Varese, Italy
- Occupations: Film director, screenwriter
- Years active: 1991–present

Renato De Maria (born 1958) is an Italian film director and screenwriter. He directed more than ten films since 1991.

== Selected filmography ==
Year	Title	Notes
2002	Paz!	
2005	Amatemi	
2009	The Front Line	
2019	The Ruthless	
2022	Robbing Mussolini	
2024	Vanished into the Night	
