= Rev. (TV series) =

Television series

- Genre: Sitcom
- Created by: Tom Hollander; James Wood
- Written by: Tom Hollander, James Wood, Jonathan Harvey, Fintan Ryan, and Sam Bain.
- Directed by: Peter Cattaneo
- Starring: Tom Hollander; Olivia Colman; Steve Evets; Miles Jupp; Simon McBurney; Ellen Thomas; Lucy Liemann; Jimmy Akingbola; Vicki Pepperdine; Joanna Scanlan; Ben Willbond
- Narrated by: Tom Hollander
- Theme music composer: Jonathan Whitehead
- Opening theme: Remix of "I Couldn't Hear Nobody Pray" by Nat King Cole
- Ending theme: "Hearing The Prayer"
- Composer: Jonathan Whitehead
- Country of origin: United Kingdom
- Original language: English
- No. of series: 3
- No. of episodes: 19

Production
- Executive producers: Matthew Justice and Simon Wilson (series one); Kenton Allen and Tom Hollander (series two)
- Producers: Kenton Allen (series one); Hannah Pescod (series one and two); Polly Buckle (series three)
- Production locations: Shoreditch, London; Hackney, London
- Running time: 25–30 minutes
- Production companies: Big Talk Productions; Handle with Prayer

Original release
- Network: BBC Two; BBC HD
- Release: 28 June 2010 – 28 April 2014

Rev. is a British television sitcom produced by Big Talk Productions. Written by actor Tom Hollander and James Wood, the show premiered on BBC Two on 28 June 2010 and ended on 28 April 2014. The show's working titles were The City Vicar and Handle with Prayer. The series revolves around a Church of England priest, played by Hollander, who becomes the vicar of an inner-city London church after leaving a small rural Suffolk parish.

Hollander said: "We wanted to define ourselves in opposition to the cliché of a country vicar, partly because we wanted to depict England as it is now, rather than having a sort of bucolic-y, over the hills and far away, bird-tweeting England – we wanted the complications of the multi-cultural, multi-ethnic inner-city, where everything is much harder."

== Plot ==
The Reverend Adam Smallbone is an Anglican priest who has moved from a small rural parish to the "socially disunited" St Saviour in the Marshes in Hackney, East London. Unwilling to turn anyone away from his pastoral care, he is faced with a series of moral challenges as he balances the needs of genuine believers, people on the streets and drug addicts, as well as the demands of social climbers using the church to get their children into the best schools.

Adam has a difficult job as a modern city vicar. His wife Alex, who has her own career as a solicitor to worry about, supports him through his life as a priest, while not being engaged with his work. He is also supported by lay reader Nigel, who believes he should be running the church. In supervision is Archdeacon Robert, who puts pressure on Adam to increase the congregation and the church's income.

Parishioners include Colin, a heavy drinking, unemployable lost soul who is Adam's most devoted parishioner; Adoha, known for her romantic intentions towards the clergy; Mick, who is homeless and appears on Adam's doorstep in different situations asking for money; and Ellie, the head teacher of the church's associated school.

== Future ==
Interviewed in April 2014, Tom Hollander said that he did not know whether there would be a fourth series, and that after the third series "we all want to just pause". He added that "the idea of not doing it any more is sad but also quite attractive, because you wouldn't want for it to ever get worse."

== Cast and characters ==
=== Main ===
- Tom Hollander as Adam Smallbone
- Olivia Colman as Alexandra (Alex) Smallbone
- Steve Evets as Colin Lambert
- Miles Jupp as Nigel McCall
- Ellen Thomas as Adoha Onyeka
- Lucy Liemann as Ellie Pattman
- Simon McBurney as Archdeacon Robert

=== Recurring ===
- Hugh Bonneville as Roland Wise (Series 1–3)
- Jimmy Akingbola as Mick (Series 1–3)
- Ben Willbond as Steve Warwick (Series 1–3)
- Sylvia Syms as Joan (Series 2)
- Ralph Fiennes as Bishop of London (Series 2–3)
- Vicki Pepperdine as Geri Tennison (Series 3)
- Joanna Scanlan as Jill Mallory (Series 3)

== Production ==
Main and recurring cast of Rev. From left to right: Jimmy Akingbola, Lucy Liemann, Olivia Colman, Ellen Thomas, Tom Hollander, Miles Jupp, Steve Evets, Simon McBurney

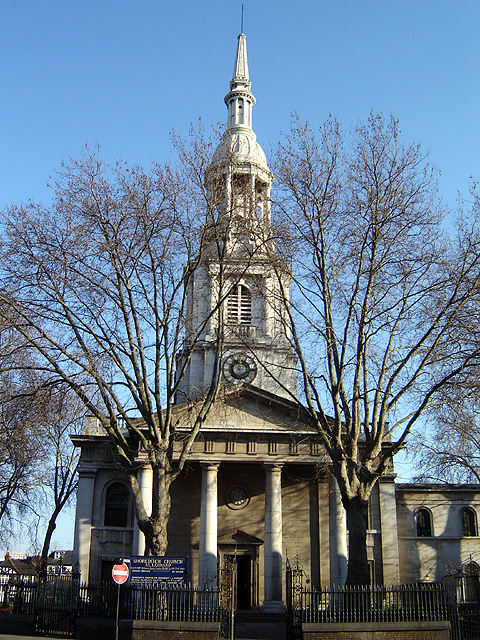
St Leonard's, Shoreditch

Six episodes were produced for the first series by Big Talk Productions for BBC Two. The show was created by Tom Hollander and James Wood. The church scenes were filmed at St Leonard's in Shoreditch, east London. The BBC Two comedy was renewed by the BBC in September 2010 and filming began again in the middle of 2011, with the second series of seven episodes premiering in November 2011. In August 2012, the show was renewed for a third series of six episodes, which aired in 2014.

Richard Coles, a Church of England priest and former member of the pop group the Communards, was one of several priests, including the Revv Kevin Sculley, Matthew Catterick, Philip North, Melanie Toogood and Andrew Wickens who advised the show's writers. Coles has been cited as an inspiration for the Adam Smallbone character.

== Episodes ==
=== Series overview ===
Series	Episodes	Originally released	
Series	Episodes	First released	Last released
1	6	28 June 2010	2 August 2010
2	7	10 November 2011	20 December 2011
3	6	24 March 2014	28 April 2014

=== Series 1 (2010) ===
No. overall	No. in series	Title	Directed by	Written by	Original release date	UK viewers (millions)
1	1	"On Your Knees Forget the Fees"	Peter Cattaneo	James Wood	28 June 2010	2.19
Adam is overwhelmed after his church sermons in London experience a large increase in attendance. The sudden flood of patrons, which includes the local MP, Patrick Yam, is because of a rumoured good Ofsted report on the local church school, with local parents becoming desperate to have their children enrolled. Meanwhile, Adam becomes tempted to trade a place in the school for money to get a stained glass window in the church restored.
2	2	"Jesus is Awesome"	Peter Cattaneo	James Wood	5 July 2010	1.59
The archdeacon tells Adam that the monetary offering from his church is too small. Needing more generous people, Adam loans priest Darren Betts the church for his services as Darren's church is undergoing renovations. However, a problem erupts when Darren will not leave after the hard work he put in updating Adam's church. Meanwhile, Alex feels lonely and decides they need to reignite the flame of their love life.
3	3	"Forests of Prejudice"	Peter Cattaneo	James Wood	12 July 2010	1.51
A Muslim children's prayer group is lent the church by Adam; however, the church's congregation is not supportive. Meanwhile, Adam decides to fight the opening of a lap-dancing club across from the school. He and headmistress Ellie Pattman attend another club for research, which leads to an embarrassing meeting with one of Ellie's former pupils. Colin is arrested for assault of a thief stealing lead from the church roof.
4	4	"The Rival"	Peter Cattaneo	James Wood	19 July 2010	1.32
Adam is envious after hearing an old rival, who is also a priest, on radio's Thought for the Day. Adam decides to speak on the television programme The One Show. However, after a controversial comment about homosexuality in the Church, the archdeacon steps in and demands Adam take media lessons from his rival. Meanwhile, Colin decides to seek God in the Rastafari religion.
5	5	"A Fine Bromance"	Peter Cattaneo	Jonathan Harvey	26 July 2010	1.48
Following Adam's recent moments of feeling excluded by people, he is excited to meet Leon, a young man who wants to marry at his church. The two soon become friends and start to do a range of activities together. However, the friendship turns sour after a dinner party where Adam discovers his wife Alex and Leon attended the same college and shared a one night stand together, much to Adam's disgust.
6	6	"Ever Been to Nando's?"	Peter Cattaneo	James Wood	2 August 2010	1.69
Adam's mind is in crisis mode after an online Christian website review of his recent sermon gives it a poor rating, which leads to Adam doubting his faith. A housebound Adam soon succumbs to the pleasures of daytime television and online gambling. Whilst Adam is away, an imposter vicar tries to take over Adam's role to avoid the consequences of paying a parking ticket and buying a beer. Adam's meltdown hits a turn for the worse when he drunkenly flirts with Ellie.

=== Series 2 (2011) ===
No. overall	No. in series	Title	Directed by	Written by	Original release date	UK viewers (millions)
7	1	"Accidental Hero"	Peter Cattaneo	James Wood	10 November 2011	2.29
When Adam inadvertently foils the mugging of Adoha's handbag by a teenager he becomes a hero as the "Kung Fu kicker vicar" and he is pleased with the attention from his wife, the archdeacon and his congregation. Adam decides the children from Ellie's school need a trip to the seaside. When Adoha gets Adam shortlisted for a "Pride of Britain" award guilt crosses his mind as the award ceremony approaches and a talk with the Bishop of London makes up his mind to turn down the award and there is still the planned seaside trip. Guest stars Ralph Fiennes.
8	2	"The Talented Curate"	Peter Cattaneo	James Wood	17 November 2011	1.63
Alex feels threatened by Abi Johnston, a talented young curate who comes to train under Adam at St Saviour's until she realises that she and Adam can spend the weekend together. Spying on Abi taking a service, Adam begins to doubt his own abilities as a priest until Colin, who has been shooting ecstasy-eating squirrels in the churchyard, decides to cheer Adam up with his own special home brew.
9	3	"Sleepless Nights"	Peter Cattaneo	James Wood	24 November 2011	1.37
Adam is plagued with nightmares, compounded by his difficult seven-year-old goddaughter, Enid, whom he and Alex are looking after. Enid's bad behaviour lead both to have misgivings about having a child of their own. A house blessing for an elderly resident of a care home is mistaken for an exorcism. A toilet for the church is thwarted by English Heritage. Guest stars Sylvia Syms.
10	4	"The Beautiful Game"	Peter Cattaneo	James Wood	1 December 2011	1.24
Adam is worried that the church school will fail its religious inspection and this puts him into conflict with Ellie, whose new teacher, Mr Feld, is an atheist who Adam frets is undermining the school's Christian ethos. He has gone so far as to give a school assembly on Richard Dawkins's The Selfish Gene. The same teacher is a good footballer who turns out for the Catholics in an inter-denominational five-a-side tournament that the archdeacon has arranged. Adam is struggling to find players for his Anglican side that includes Alex, Nigel and Mick – but not Colin, who has become a Buddhist.
11	5	"Accounting"	Peter Cattaneo	Fintan Ryan	8 December 2011	1.24
Mick has given up crack cocaine and to help him, Adam allows him to stay at the vicarage much to Alex's dismay and her plans to conceive a child involving sex with Adam at all times of the day. Nigel is concerned about balancing the church's finances before the archdeacon's audit and a desperate Adam steals £150 from an investment banker who is another drug addict. Guest stars Richard E. Grant.
12	6	"Day of Decisions"	Peter Cattaneo	James Wood	15 December 2011	1.62
Advancement in the Church of England is a devious business for Nigel, who wants to be a priest, and Archdeacon Robert a bishop. Adam's marriage to Alex is in doubt when she takes a weekend walking holiday in Shropshire with friends because church business is taking all of Adam's time. Guest stars James Purefoy and Sylvia Syms.
13	7	"Christmas Special"	Peter Cattaneo	James Wood and Sam Bain	20 December 2011	1.53
With Alex's father staying, the pressures of Advent, cooking breakfast for the homeless, playing Father Christmas for Ellie's schoolchildren, the extra services and dealing with a drunken violent Colin, take their toll on Adam culminating in a disastrous Midnight Mass with a church congregation boosted by revellers from the local pubs and clubs. Christmas Day and Alex tells Adam she is pregnant and lunch at the church, a pastiche of the Last Supper, is a focal point for reconciliation. Guest stars Geoffrey Palmer.

=== Series 3 (2014) ===
The six episodes of Series 3 commenced filming on 31 October 2013 and premiered on 24 March 2014.

No. overall	No. in series	Title	Directed by	Written by	Original release date	UK viewers (millions)
14	1	"Birth"	Peter Cattaneo	James Wood; Story: Tom Hollander and James Wood	24 March 2014	1.71
Adam's wife gives birth in Archdeacon Robert's taxi as Adam presides over Ellie Pattman's wedding. Ten months later and Adam has still not christened his daughter. The local playground needs refurbishment and with the local Imam, Yussef Hasan (Kayvan Novak), Adam fundraises with the help of the two congregations and impresses the new area dean, Jill Mallory, and the diocesan secretary, Geri Tennison, who plan to close his church.
15	2	"Gay Weddings"	Peter Cattaneo	James Wood	31 March 2014	1.65
Archdeacon Robert convinces the reluctant Adam to enroll in a course in the hope of finding out how to rescue St Saviour's from closure, but struggles with leader Roland Wise's (Hugh Bonneville) approach to ministry. Two of Adam's friends, Jez and Rob, ask him to carry out their marriage ceremony, which is against the Church of England's position on gay marriage and he agrees only to give them a blessing following the Wednesday Eucharist service and nearly falls foul of canon law.
16	3	"Donation"	Peter Cattaneo	Tom Hollander	7 April 2014	1.32
Controversial local artist Mike Tobin (Dexter Fletcher) offers to make a £60,000 donation to St Saviour's, to display a new sculpture in the church, that would clear Adam's financial problems. Adam enlists headmistress Ellie Pattman, who is divorcing her husband, and the schoolchildren to help him in his campaign against litter louts; emotions run high and Adam kisses her. Adam's reaction to Tobin's sculpture, "Beyond Belief", loses the donation to the church when he misunderstands its meaning.
17	4	"A New Parishioner"	Peter Cattaneo	Sam Bain	14 April 2014	1.31
Adam believes a new parishioner, George (Nick Sidi), a City of London accountant, can balance the church books for the forthcoming audit but the man was recently released from prison for possessing child abuse images. Alex discovers Adam and Ellie's kiss and throws him out, leaving him to stay at Nigel's flat and Colin's hostel. Adam's plea for George to be taken on as church treasurer receives a hostile reception from the parochial church council, Nigel, Colin and Adoha.
18	5	"Conduct Unbecoming"	Peter Cattaneo	Tom Hollander and James Wood	21 April 2014	1.21
Holy Week is approaching and Nigel has reported Adam for unprofessional conduct with headmistress Ellie Pattman. The Bishop of London (Ralph Fiennes) suspends Adam from his pastoral duties and asks Archdeacon Robert to conduct a small investigation with all the parties involved. The area dean and diocesan secretary begin planning the closure of Adam's church as wild exaggerations spread to the local press and he is unable to conceal his separation from Alex. The neighbouring church want to borrow a large heavy cross for a procession and Adam carries it through the streets at night, suffering abuse as he goes. Colin denies knowing him three times. In the morning, after a mysterious encounter on a hill with a stranger (Liam Neeson, who tells him, "We all have our crosses to bear"), Adam tenders his resignation and the church is boarded up.
19	6	"Destiny"	Peter Cattaneo	James Wood; Story: Tom Hollander and James Wood	28 April 2014	1.23
Following his resignation and the church's closure Adam works part-time at the local convenience store while applying for other jobs. Broken hearted, Adam retires to bed until Alex organises a reunion of Adam's parishioners for an Easter Day service and the baptism of his daughter Katie in the closed church.

== Reception ==
The series was commended by The Independent as intelligent comedy, with Hollander "as good as ever" and a strong support cast.

In 2011, Rev. won the South Bank Award for Best Comedy and was nominated for the Royal Television Society Programme Awards for Best Scripted Comedy and Best Comedy Performance (Hollander).

At the 2011 British Academy Television Awards, the series won Best Sitcom, with Hollander also nominated for Best Male Comedy Performance. Both were nominated again in the same categories the following year, without winning. At the 2015 British Academy Television Awards, Hollander and Colman were nominated for Best Male Comedy Performance and Best Female Comedy Performance, respectively.

== Home releases ==
The complete first series was released on DVD by 2 Entertain on 21 November 2011.

The second series was released on 19 November 2012. A boxset containing the first two series was also released.

The third series was released on 5 May 2014, a week after transmission of the final episode. A boxset containing the first three series was also released.
