= School of Comedy =

Television series

- Title card
- Genre: Comedy
- Created by: Laura Lawson
- Directed by: Alex Hardcastle
- Starring: Various actors/actresses
- Country of origin: United Kingdom
- Original language: English
- No. of series: 2
- No. of episodes: 12

Production
- Executive producer: Andy Harries
- Producer: Laura Lawson
- Editor: Steve Andrews
- Running time: 30 minutes (including advertisement breaks)
- Production company: Left Bank Pictures

Original release
- Network: E4 (series)
- Release: 1 October 2009 – 18 October 2010

School of Comedy is a British character-based comedy sketch show which was turned into a television show after a successful run of revue shows at Edinburgh festival.

The cast was entirely made up from members of the after-school drama club of The Harrodian School in London, run by teacher Laura Lawson.

The show comprised sketches involving a diverse group of characters, from a lesbian couple in 1940s war-time Britain to a pair of South African security guards. Even though the show's content is mature enough to need to be shown after the watershed, the roles are all played by school-aged performers.

The show ran for two series on E4 from 1 October 2009 to 18 October 2010.

The show has been credited with starting the careers of Will Poulter, Charlie Wernham and Jack Harries. Poulter has gone on to star in films such as The Chronicles of Narnia: The Voyage of the Dawn Treader, We're the Millers and Guardians of the Galaxy Vol. 3, while Harries went on to start a YouTube channel named JacksGap, which had over 4 million subscribers and made Harries both well-known and popular on the internet. Wernham has gone on to play parts in Bad Education, Some Girls, The Inbetweeners and Robbie Roscoe in Hollyoaks. Beth Rylance has since had a lead role in The Ministry of Curious Stuff and has had various guest and advertising roles.

== Cast / Character(s) ==
| Actor/Actress | Character(s) |
|---|---|
| Will Poulter | Bota Saffas - One of two South-African security guards. Geoff - A 1970s copper. Leonard Lizard - A greedy, closeted 1980s businessman who founded Lizard Corporation. Parody of Gordon Gekko. Mr Mills - A blunt and 'non-PC' school teacher. Pongo - A 1940s homosexual navy officer whose wife is a lesbian. Terry - A 'typical white van man' (a British stereotype of a handyman). And smaller non-recurring parts |
| Jack Harries | Marv - A hot-shot Hollywood movie producer. Marcus - An employee of Lizard Corporation, and the object of Leonard's affection. And smaller non-recurring parts |
| Beth Rylance | Angharad - A rude blind lady who despises her husband. Karel - An Eastern-European immigrant working for a rich British family. Margot - A 1940s lesbian. Vota Saffas - One of two South-African security guards. And smaller non-recurring parts |

- Africa Nile
- Lilly Lucia Ainsworth
- Ella Ainsworth
- Grace Vance
- Max Langdale Brown
- Joe Taylor
- Hector McCormick
- Charlie Wernham
- Evie Henderson
- Arthur Sturridge
- Olivia Archer-Deakin
- Lacey-Ann Walsh
- Finn Harries
