= Sky Atlantic =

British television channel

- Logo used since 2026

- Alternate Logo for UI/EPG, digital and small format spaces.
- Country: United Kingdom
- Broadcast area: United Kingdom; Ireland

Programming
- Language: English
- Picture format: 1080i HDTV (downscaled to 16:9 576i for the SDTV feed.)
- Timeshift service: Sky Atlantic +1

Ownership
- Owner: Sky Group (Comcast)
- Sister channels: List of Sky UK channels

History
- Launched: 1 February 2011; 15 years ago
- Replaced: Virgin1; Bravo

Links
- Website: sky.com

Availability

Terrestrial
- Sky UK: Channel 108
- Virgin Media: Channel 111

Streaming media
- Sky Go: Watch live (UK and Ireland only)
- Now: Watch live (UK and Ireland only)

Sky Atlantic VIP
- Logo used from 2017 to 2019
- Country: United Kingdom
- Broadcast area: United Kingdom; Ireland

Programming
- Language: English
- Picture format: 1080i HDTV (downscaled to 16:9 576i for the SDTV feed.)

Ownership
- Owner: Sky Group (Comcast)

History
- Launched: 25 July 2017; 9 years ago
- Closed: 12 June 2019; 7 years ago

Links
- Website: skyatlantic.sky.com

Sky Atlantic is a British pay television channel owned by Sky Group Limited that launched in 2011 and broadcasts in the United Kingdom and Ireland. The channel airs original British-produced dramas like Fortitude, Tin Star, and Gangs of London, but is primarily dedicated to imported programmes from the United States. It previously held the domestic rights to HBO programming from January 2011 to March 2026, and Showtime programming from January 2016 to December 2021. It is available on the Sky satellite TV platform (including Sky Go and Now), and Virgin Media.

Sky Deutschland broadcasts a German-language version of the channel in Germany, Austria, and Switzerland, while Sky Italia broadcasts an Italian-language version of the channel in Italy. Their programming is also dominated by acquired series, usually dubbed in the domestic language. The Italian channel also premieres Sky Originals produced in the country, like Gomorrah, The Young Pope, and ZeroZeroZero.

== Background ==
=== Launch and availability ===
It was announced on 25 October 2010 that Sky Atlantic would launch on Sky channel 108, which was previously occupied by Sky 3. Sky Atlantic launched on 1 February 2011 on Sky in the United Kingdom and Ireland.

At launch, Stuart Murphy was the director of programmes for Sky One, Sky Two, Pick and Sky Atlantic. On 5 May 2011, Elaine Pyke, the head of drama at Sky, was promoted to director of Sky Atlantic, reporting to Murphy. Programmes on the channel are also offered to Sky customers via on-demand channels including the On Demand and Sky Go services and Now. Both BT TV and Virgin Media had held talks with Sky over the new channel but were unable to agree a carriage deal, in Virgin's case due to pricing. On 23 February 2026, Virgin Media O2 announced that Sky Atlantic would be added to Virgin Media's Stream and TV 360 packages beginning on 1 April under a new deal with Sky.

=== Additional channels ===
A one-hour timeshift of Sky Atlantic started broadcasting on 20 September 2012 on channel 173 as Sky Atlantic +1. It moved to channel 170 on 9 June 2015 as part of a reshuffle which also included the closure of Sky 3D, Sky Livingit becoming Real Lives and Sky Arts 1 and Sky Arts 2 merging to become simply Sky Arts. It moved to channel 217 on 18 July 2017 as part of the Sky Sports reshuffle which included Sky Sports Mix moving to entertainment, and again to 208 on 1 May 2018 as part of Sky's major EPG reshuffle due to Sky Atlantic being channel 108.

Sky Atlantic was available in both standard definition and high definition, the latter on Sky Atlantic HD. Sky Atlantic also utilises the HD swap bouquet system developed by Sky, which switches SD channels with HD channels for HD Pack subscribers, meaning Sky Atlantic HD is on channel 108 and the standard definition version appears on channel 808.

Sky Atlantic VIP was a rewards channel for subscribers of Sky TV who had been with Sky for two or more years and for subscribers who had the Sky Original Bundle (later Sky Entertainment pack, then Sky Signature pack). The HD version also required the HD pack in the UK and the Sky Box Sets pack in Ireland. The channel only broadcast brand new episodes of a popular show a week or so before being shown on the main Sky Atlantic channel. An example of this is when episodes of Riviera were shown first on Sky Atlantic VIP, then a week or so later on Sky Atlantic. Sky Atlantic VIP was under Sky VIP's "See-It-First" offer. Sky VIP is a rewards programme for long-term Sky subscribers. When the channel was not broadcasting a brand new episode of a programme, the channel was off-air resulting in the channel being on-air only for a few hours per week. The channel only broadcast adverts for programmes on Sky channels. The SD version was on Sky channel 994 with the HD version on channel 995. The channel closed on 12 June 2019.

In January 2024, select programming began being simulcast on Sky Showcase until its shutdown in February 2026.

=== Acquisitions ===
Sky Atlantic relies heavily on screenings of US television programmes, with more than 50% of all programming coming from HBO. Although the channel mainly screens dramas, blocks in the channel's schedule were dedicated to comedies and movies. The launch of Sky Atlantic in 2011 followed the broadcaster's £150m, five-year deal to buy exclusive UK and Ireland television rights to HBO's entire archive, new HBO programming and a first-look deal on all co-productions. Although it had been renewed since, the exclusivity deal with HBO expired on 26 March 2026 with the launch of the HBO Max streaming service in the UK, Ireland, Germany, Austria, Switzerland, and Italy. In December 2024, the existing deal between Sky and Warner Bros. Discovery was updated to include life-of-series rights to all HBO programming released before the expiry date, including House of the Dragon, The Last of Us, The White Lotus, Euphoria, and Dune: Prophecy. All future HBO original programming, like Harry Potter, would be released exclusively on HBO Max. Sky still planned to make new acquisitions via separate agreements on a programme-by-programme basis, while new series in existing franchises would continue to be released on Sky as "co-exclusives".

In January 2016, Sky expanded the acquired programming on Atlantic after purchasing the broadcast rights to Showtime programming; however, Sky Atlantic did not broadcast all Showtime programmes, as some series would later air on Channel 4 as part of a separate deal. The deal with Showtime expired in December 2021, with all future series becoming exclusive to the Paramount+ streaming service which launched in the UK, Ireland, Germany, Austria, Switzerland, and Italy in 2022, while a separate agreement allowed Billions to continue on Sky.

In 2025, Sky started acquiring several series from Peacock. In early 2026, they signed first-look deals with Starz and Canal+ that would involve co-commissioning future projects together.

== Current programming ==
=== Drama ===
Title	Genre	Premiere	Series	Length	Status	Notes
Under Salt Marsh	Crime thriller	30 January 2026	1 series, 6 episodes	47–55 min.	Renewed	
Prisoner	Thriller	30 April 2026	1 series, 6 episodes	44–50 min.	Renewed	

=== Co-productions ===
Title	Genre	Partner/Country	Premiere	Series	Length	Status	Notes
Gangs of London	Action crime drama	AMC/United States (Note: The first series was initially co-produced with Cinemax but was later moved to AMC who became co-producers from the second series onwards.)	23 April 2020	3 series, 25 episodes	53–93 min.	Renewed	
Sweetpea	Dark comedy drama	Starz/United States	10 October 2024	1 series, 6 episodes	41–50 min.	Series 2 due to premiere on 26 November 2026	
The Day of the Jackal	Spy thriller	Peacock/United States	7 November 2024	1 series, 10 episodes	46–61 min.	Series 2 due to premiere in 2027	
Fightland	Crime drama	Starz/United States	27 August 2026	1 series, 8 episodes	51–54 min.	Pending	
War	Legal drama anthology	HBO/United States	2 October 2026	1 series, 8 episodes	46–54 min.	Renewed	

=== Acquired programming ===
- Crystal Lake
- Dune: Prophecy
- Fargo (Note: Previously aired on Channel 4)
- The Five-Star Weekend
- The Gilded Age
- The Good Daughter
- Heated Rivalry
- House of the Dragon
- It: Welcome to Derry
- A Knight of the Seven Kingdoms
- The Last of Us
- The Miniature Wife
- Task
- The Terror (series 3) (Note: Previously aired on BBC Two for series 1–2)
- True Detective
- The White Lotus
- Yaga

== Upcoming programming ==
=== Drama ===
Title	Genre	Premiere	Series	Length	Status	Notes
The Death of Sherlock Holmes	Mystery drama	2027	1 series, 8 episodes	TBA	In-production	
Meantime	Crime thriller	2027	1 series, 6 episodes	TBA	In-production	
Charmer	Romantic drama	TBA	1 series, 8 episodes	TBA	In-production	
The Girl with the Dragon Tattoo	Neo-noir drama	TBA	1 series, 8 episodes	TBA	In-production	

=== Acquired programming ===
- Preacher (6 December 2026) (Note: Previously aired on Amazon Prime Video)
- Superfakes (2027)

== Former programming ==
=== Drama ===
Title	Genre	Original Broadcast	Series	Notes
Hit & Miss	Crime drama	2012	1 series, 6 episodes	
The British	Docudrama	2012	1 series, 7 episodes	
Fortitude	Psychological thriller	2015–18	3 series, 26 episodes	
Riviera	Crime drama	2017–20	3 series, 28 episodes	
Tin Star	Crime drama	2017–20	3 series, 25 episodes	
Save Me	Mystery drama	2018–20	2 series, 12 episodes	Retitled Save Me Too for the second series
Little Birds	Historical romance drama	2020	1 series, 6 episodes	
The Fear Index	Thriller	2022	1 series, 4 episodes	
This England	Biographical drama	2022	1 series, 6 episodes	
Atomic	Action drama	2025	1 series, 5 episodes	
The Iris Affair	Thriller	2025	1 series, 8 episodes	
Amadeus	Historical drama	2025	1 series, 5 episodes	
Possession	Supernatural thriller	2026	1 series, 5 episodes	

=== Comedy ===
Title	Genre	Original Broadcast	Series	Notes
This is Jinsy	Comedy	2011–14	2 series, 17 episodes	Previously aired the pilot episode on BBC Three
Walking and Talking	Teen comedy	2012	1 series, 4 episodes	
Hunderby	Historical dark comedy	2012–15	2 series, 10 episodes	
Common Ground	Comedy	2013	1 series, 10 episodes	
Mr. Sloane	Historical comedy	2014	1 series, 6 episodes	
Doll & Em (series 2)	Comedy	2015	1 series, 6 episodes	Previously aired on Sky Living for series 1.
Camping	Comedy	2016	1 series, 6 episodes	
The Trip (series 3)	Sitcom	2017	1 series, 6 episodes	Previously aired on BBC Two for series 1–2. Moved to Sky One for series 4–5.
I Hate Suzie	Dark comedy drama	2020–22	2 series, 11 episodes	Retitled I Hate Suzie Too for the second series
Dreamland	Comedy	2023	1 series, 6 episodes	
Small Town, Big Story (Note: Simulcast on Sky Max.)	Dark comedy drama	2025	1 series, 6 episodes	
The Death of Bunny Munro	Dark comedy	2025	1 series, 6 episodes	

=== Unscripted ===
Title	Genre	Original Broadcast	Series	Notes
Thronecast	Talk show	2011–19	8 series, 77 episodes	Aftershow for Game of Thrones
The Devil's Dinner Party	Game show	2011–12	1 series, 20 episodes	
Cleverdicks	Game show	2012	1 series, 30 episodes	
Morgan Spurlock's New Britannia	Talk show	2012	1 series, 10 episodes	
God Save The Queens	Docuseries	2012	1 series, 3 episodes	
Mid Morning Matters with Alan Partridge	Radio show	2012–16	2 series, 12 episodes	Edited version of the web series of the same name
Adam Buxton's Bug	Stand-up	2012	1 series, 8 episodes	
Ronna and Beverly	Talk show	2012	1 series, 6 episodes	
Don't Sit In The Front Row	Stand-up	2012–13	2 series, 16 episodes	
Set List: Stand Up Without a Net	Stand-up	2013–14	2 series, 14 episodes	

=== Co-productions ===
Title	Genre	Partner/Country	Original Broadcast	Series	Notes
Falcón	Crime drama	Canal+/France; ZDF/Germany	2012	1 series, 4 episodes	
The Tunnel	Crime drama	Canal+/France	2013–17	3 series, 24 episodes	
Penny Dreadful	Dark fantasy drama	Showtime/United States	2014–16	3 series, 27 episodes	
The Last Panthers	Crime drama	Canal+/France	2015	1 series, 6 episodes	
Guerrilla	Historical drama	Showtime/United States	2017	1 series, 6 episodes	
Britannia	Historical fantasy	Amazon Prime Video (series 1); Epix/United States (series 2–3)	2018–21	3 series, 27 episodes	
Patrick Melrose	Drama	Showtime/United States	2018	1 series, 5 episodes	
Sally4Ever	Comedy	HBO/United States	2018	1 series, 7 episodes	
Chernobyl	Historical drama	HBO/United States	2019	1 series, 5 episodes	
Catherine the Great	Historical drama	HBO/United States	2019	1 series, 4 episodes	
Upright (series 1)	Comedy drama	Fox Showcase/Australia	2019	1 series, 8 episodes	Moved to Sky Comedy for series 2.
The End	Drama	Fox Showcase/Australia	2020	1 series, 10 episodes	
The Third Day	Psychological thriller	HBO/United States	2020	1 series, 6 episodes	
Domina	Historical drama	Sky Atlantic/Italy; MGM+/United States (series 2)	2021–23	2 series, 16 episodes	
Landscapers	True crime comedy drama	HBO/United States	2021	1 series, 4 episodes	
The Baby	Horror comedy	HBO/United States	2022	1 series, 8 episodes	
The Lovers	Romantic comedy	Sundance Now/United States	2023	1 series, 6 episodes	
Mary & George	Historical drama	Starz/United States (Note: The series was initially co-produced with AMC but was later moved to Starz.)	2024	1 series, 7 episodes	
The Tattooist of Auschwitz	Historical drama	Peacock/United States; Stan/Australia	2024	1 series, 6 episodes	
Lockerbie: A Search for Truth	Biographical drama	Peacock/United States	2025	1 series, 5 episodes	

=== Acquired programming ===
==== HBO programming ====
- Angels In America
- Ballers
- Band Of Brothers
- Banshee (Note: Cinemax programming)
- Barry (series 1–2) (Note: Moved to Sky Comedy for series 3–4)
- Big Little Lies
- Big Love
- Boardwalk Empire
- Bored to Death
- The Brink
- Camping
- Carnivàle
- The Comeback (series 1–2) (Note: Moved to Sky Comedy for series 3)
- Crashing
- Curb Your Enthusiasm (series 1–9) (Note: Moved to Sky Comedy for series 10–12)
- Deadwood
- The Deuce
- Divorce
- DTF St. Louis
- Enlightened
- Entourage
- Euphoria
- Funny or Die Presents
- Game of Thrones
- Girls
- Hacks (series 5) (Note: HBO Max / Max programming) (Note: Previously aired on Amazon Prime Video for series 1–2 and Sky Max for series 3–4.)
- Hello Ladies
- Here and Now
- High Maintenance
- How to Make It in America
- The Idol
- I Know This Much Is True
- Insecure (series 1–3) (Note: Moved to Sky Comedy for series 4–5)
- In Treatment
- Irma Vep
- John Adams
- Julia
- The Knick
- Last Week Tonight with John Oliver (series 1–6) (Note: Moved to Sky Comedy for series 7–12 then Sky One for series 13 onward)
- The Leftovers
- Looking
- Lovecraft Country
- Luck
- Mare of Easttown
- Mildred Pierce
- Mosaic
- Mrs. Fletcher
- My Brilliant Friend
- The Nevers (series 1A) (Note: Moved to ITVX for series 1B)
- The Newsroom
- The Night Of
- Olive Kitteridge
- The Outsider
- The Pacific
- The Penguin
- Perry Mason
- The Plot Against America
- Quarry
- Raised By Wolves
- Real Time with Bill Maher (series 12–17) (Note: Moved to Sky Comedy for series 18 onwards)
- The Regime
- Room 104 (series 1) (Note: Moved to Sky Comedy for series 2–4)
- Scenes from a Marriage
- Sex and the City
- Sharp Objects
- Show Me a Hero
- Silicon Valley
- Six Feet Under
- The Sopranos
- Sort Of
- The Staircase
- Station Eleven
- Succession
- The Sympathizer
- Tell Me You Love Me
- The Time Traveler's Wife
- Togetherness
- Trackers
- Treme
- True Blood
- The Undoing
- Veep
- Vice Principals
- Vinyl
- Watchmen
- We Own This City
- Westworld
- White House Plumbers
- Winning Time: The Rise of the Lakers Dynasty
- The Wire

==== Showtime programming ====
- The Affair
- American Rust (series 1) (Note: Moved to Amazon Prime Video for series 2)
- Billions
- The Borgias
- Black Monday (series 1–2) (Note: Moved to Sky Comedy for series 3)
- Brotherhood
- Californication
- City on a Hill (series 1–2) (Note: Moved to Paramount+ for series 3)
- The Comey Rule
- Dexter
- Dexter: New Blood
- Dice
- Escape at Dannemora
- The Good Lord Bird
- Happyish
- House of Lies
- I'm Dying Up Here
- Kidding
- The Loudest Voice
- The L Word: Generation Q (series 1–2)
- Nurse Jackie
- Penny Dreadful: City of Angels
- Ray Donovan (Note: Moved to Paramount+ for Ray Donovan: The Movie)
- SMILF
- Twin Peaks: The Return
- Weeds
- White Famous
- Yellowjackets (series 1) (Note: Moved to Paramount+ for series 2–4)
- Your Honor (series 1) (Note: Moved to Paramount+ for series 2)

==== Miscellaneous ====
- All Her Fault
- Awake
- The Bear (Note: Previously aired on Disney+ and ITVX)
- Blue Bloods (series 1–8) (Note: Moved to Sky Witness for series 9–14)
- Faithless
- Fleming: The Man Who Would Be Bond
- The Following
- Friday Night Lights
- Homicide: Life on the Street
- In Our Blood
- Little Bird
- The Looming Tower (Note: Previously aired on BBC Two)
- Mad Men
- Penelope
- Ponies
- Smash

== Most watched programmes ==
The following is a list of the ten most watched programmes on Sky Atlantic (all of them being episodes of Game of Thrones), based on Live +7 data supplied by BARB up to 20 May 2019. The number of viewers does not include repeats or Irish ratings. Additionally, all of these episodes were the most viewed programme of the week on non-terrestrial television in the UK. Game of Thrones is Sky's most popular show.

Rank	Programme	Episode	Number of viewers	Date
1	Game of Thrones	8.04 – The Last of the Starks	5,430,451	6 May 2019
2	Game of Thrones	8.02 – A Knight of the Seven Kingdoms	5,266,034	22 April 2019
4	Game of Thrones	8.05 – The Bells	5,039,355	13 May 2019
3	Game of Thrones	8.06 – The Iron Throne	5,011,277	20 May 2019
5	Game of Thrones	8.03 – The Long Night	4,983,910	29 April 2019
6	Game of Thrones	8.01 – Winterfell	4,380,834	15 April 2019
7	Game of Thrones	7.07 – The Dragon and the Wolf	3,535,000	28 August 2017
8	Game of Thrones	7.01 – Dragonstone	3,487,000	17 July 2017
9	Game of Thrones	7.05 – Eastwatch	3,420,000	14 August 2017
10	Game of Thrones	7.03 – The Queen's Justice	3,263,000	31 July 2017
