= The Girl with the Dragon Tattoo (TV series) =

British television series

- Based on: The Girl with the Dragon Tattoo by Stieg Larsson
- Written by: Steve Lightfoot; Angela LaManna; Amanda Coe
- Directed by: Reinaldo Marcus Green; Andrea Harkin; Amy Neil
- Starring: David Oyelowo; Viola Prettejohn; Camille Cottin; Jonathan Pryce; Lena Olin; James D’Arcy; Alun Armstrong; Paul Ready; Jessica Raine
- Country of origin: United Kingdom
- Original language: English

Production
- Executive producers: Steve Lightfoot; Angela LaManna; Amanda Coe; Andy Harries; Charlotte Moore; John Phillips; Sam Hoyle; Amy Pascal; Scott Rudin; David Oyelowo; Reinaldo Marcus Green
- Producer: Nuala O’Leary
- Cinematography: Yaron Orbach
- Production companies: Sony Pictures Television; Left Bank Pictures; Jarowskij/Yellow Bird

Original release
- Network: Sky

The Girl with the Dragon Tattoo is an upcoming British television series adapted from the novel of the same name by Stieg Larsson.

== Premise ==
Set in the present day, a disgraced journalist Mikael Blomkvist and a bitter-ender hacker Lisbeth Salander investigate a case about Harriet Vanger, who was disappeared more than three decades ago, from the secluded island home of one of Sweden’s most powerful industrial dynasties. The deeper they go into the Vanger family's history of burials, the closer they get to a danger that threatens them.

== Cast ==
- David Oyelowo as Mikael Blomkvist
- Viola Prettejohn as Lisbeth Salander
- Camille Cottin as Erika Berger
- Jonathan Pryce as Henrik Vanger
  - Danny Horn as young Henrik
- Lena Olin as Isabella Vanger
  - Lucy Brown as young Isabella
- James D’Arcy as Martin Vanger
  - Ewan Labram as young Martin
- Alun Armstrong as Harald Vanger
  - Alastair Natkiel as young Harald
- Paul Ready as Birger Vanger
  - Joseph Mason-Coombs as Birger
- Jessica Raine as Cecilia Vanger
- Ingrid Keighley as young Harriet Vanger
- Ariyon Bakare as Palmgren
- Lee Ross as DI Gustaf Morell
- Steve Wall as Otto Falk
- Justin Salinger as Bjurman
- Allan Corduner as Dirch Frode
- Rochenda Sandall as Armansky
- Naomi Townsend as Mimmi Wu
- Daniella Arthur-Kennedy as Pernilla Blomkvist
- Enzo Cilenti as Greger Beckman
- Dónall Ó Héalaí as Anders Ahlund
- Lochlann Ó Mearáin as Gottfried.

== Production ==
=== Development ===
The series, which had been in development since May 2020, was announced in October 2023. Veena Sud was initially tapped as the showrunner.

In January 2026, the eight-part series was commissioned by Sky Original with Left Bank Pictures producing for whom Andy Harries, Charlotte Moore and John Phillips are executive producers, alongside Sam Hoyle, Amy Pascal, and Scott Rudin. Sony Pictures Television also produces the series. The adaptation of the Millennium series' first novel is written by Amanda Coe, Steve Lightfoot and Angela LaManna, who are also executive producers. Nuala O’Leary is a series producer. Reinaldo Marcus Green directs and executive produces, with Andrea Harkin and Amy Neil also directing.

=== Casting ===
In September 2026, the lead cast members were announced as David Oyelowo as Mikael Blomkvist and Viola Prettejohn as Lisbeth Salander. Oyelowo also serves as executive producer. Jonathan Pryce, James D’Arcy, Lena Olin, Camille Cottin, Alun Armstrong, Jessica Raine and Paul Ready joined the cast in November, alongside Ariyon Bakare, Lee Ross, Steve Wall, Justin Salinger, Allan Corduner, Rochenda Sandall, Naomi Townsend, Ingrid Keighley, Danny Horn, Lucy Brown, Alastair Natkiel, Ewan Labram, Joseph Mason-Coombs, Daniella Arthur-Kennedy, Enzo Cilenti, Dónall Ó Héalaí, and Lochlann Ó Mearáin.

=== Filming ===
Filming commenced in Lithuania in October 2026.

== Release ==
The series will premiere on Sky in the U.K., Ireland, Italy, Germany, Switzerland and Austria. Sony Pictures Television is handling international distribution.
