= Rebecca Frayn =

English documentary film maker, screenwriter, novelist and actress

- Occupations: Filmmaker; screenwriter; novelist; actress
- Years active: 1979–present
- Spouse: Andy Harries (m. 1992)
- Children: 3, including Jack and Finn
- Father: Michael Frayn

Rebecca Frayn is an English documentary film maker, screenwriter, novelist and actress.

== Career ==
Rebecca Frayn is a film maker and screenwriter. She has directed a wide variety of quirky documentary essays for the BBC, Channel 4 and ITV on subjects that range from Tory Wives to the Friern Barnet Mental Asylum and identical twins.

She played the role of June in the 1979 TV movie One Fine Day, directed by Stephen Frears and starring Robert Stephens and Dominic Guard. She appeared uncredited as the photograph image by Denis O'Regan of Liam Neeson's character's dead wife, Joanna, in the film Love Actually (2003), directed by Richard Curtis.

She made her drama debut as a director with Whose Baby? for ITV, a TV drama that tackled father's rights, starring Sophie Okonedo and Andrew Lincoln. A screenplay she wrote for the BBC, Killing Me Softly explored the true story of Sara Thornton, whose conviction for murder helped bring about a reform of the law on domestic violence. She has written and/or directed a number of films about prominent women, including Leni Riefenstahl, Annie Leibovitz and Nora Ephron. Her screenplay about Aung San Suu Kyi, The Lady, directed by Luc Besson and starring Michelle Yeoh and David Thewlis was awarded the Amnesty International Human Rights Film Award in 2011.

Her first novel, One Life, dealt with the complex emotional and ethical landscape of IVF. Her second novel, Deceptions, is a psychological thriller, inspired by a true story; it explores the impact on a family when a child goes missing.

After making a short film in 2008 opposing the proposed expansion of London Heathrow Airport, Frayn co-founded We CAN, a group who lobbied the government to take action on climate change in the run up to the 2010 Copenhagen Conference.

Frayn wrote the screenplay for the 2020 film Misbehaviour, that deals with the controversy surrounding the 1970 Miss World competition, and the birth of feminism.

== Personal life ==
The daughter of playwright and novelist Michael Frayn and his first wife, Gillian (née Palmer), Frayn grew up in North West England. She graduated from the University of Bristol in 1984. She married film producer Andy Harries in July 1992 and they have three children: twin sons, Jack Harries and Finn Harries, and a daughter Emmy. Frayn had to undergo IVF to have her daughter, an experience which inspired her novel One Life. She has served as chair of Turnham Green Friends, a group that helps to care for the park of that name in Chiswick.

== Credits ==
=== As novelist ===
Year	Name	Publisher
2006	One Life	Simon & Schuster
2010	Deceptions	Simon & Schuster

=== As drama director ===
Year	Film	Broadcaster
2003	Single – Episodes 1 to 3 of 6	Tiger Aspect for ITV1
2004	Whose Baby?	Granada ITV1

=== As documentary director ===
Year	Film	Broadcaster
1991	The Ghosts of Oxford Street	Channel 4 / Middlemarch Films
1993	Annie Leibovitz – South Bank Show	ITV / Middlemarch Films
1995	Talk Radio – Naked News	Channel 4 / Oxford TV
1995	Nora Ephron – South Bank Show	LWT / Middlemarch Films
1995	Tory Wives – Modern Times	BBC 2 / Middlemarch Films
1997	Identical Twins – Cutting Edge	Channel 4 / Middlemarch Films
1998	Bare – Modern Times	BBC 2 / Middlemarch Films
1999	Asylum – Cutting Edge	Channel 4 / Compulsive Viewing
2000	Space X3 episodes	BBC 2 / Middlemarch Films
2003	The World According To Parr – Imagine	BBC One

=== As documentary producer ===
Year	Film	Broadcaster
1993	The Wonderful Horrible World of Leni Riefenstahl – Without Walls Special	Channel 4 / Middlemarch and Omega Films
1999	Upstarts x 3 episodes	Channel 4 / Middlemarch Films

=== As screen writer ===
Year	Film	Broadcaster	Director
1991	The Last Laugh He Play/She Play	Channel 4/ Middlemarch Films	Betsan Morris Evans
1991	The Ghosts of Oxford Street	Channel 4 / Middlemarch Films	Rebecca Frayn and Malcolm McLaren
1996	Killing Me Softly – Screen on One	BBC Two/Middlemarch Films	Stephen Wittaker
2011	The Lady	Europacorp and Left Bank Pictures	Luc Besson
2020	Misbehaviour	Pathé and Left Bank Pictures	Philippa Lowthorpe

=== As actress ===
Year	Film	Role	Director
1979	One Fine Day	June	Stephen Frears
2003	Love Actually	Joanna (photo image)	Richard Curtis
