= 7th National Television Awards =

British awards ceremony in 2001

- Date: 23 October 2001
- Location: Royal Albert Hall, London
- Country: United Kingdom
- Presented by: Various
- Hosted by: Trevor McDonald
- Website: http://www.nationaltvawards.com/

Television/radio coverage
- Network: ITV

The 7th National Television Awards ceremony was held at the Royal Albert Hall on 23 October 2001 and was hosted by Sir Trevor McDonald.

== Awards ==
Category	Winner	Also nominated
Most Popular Actor	David Jason (A Touch of Frost)	Martin Kemp (EastEnders); Robson Green (Close and True), Steve McFadden (EastEnders); John Thaw (Inspector Morse)
Most Popular Actress	Amanda Burton (Silent Witness)	June Brown (EastEnders); Debra Stephenson (Bad Girls), Lucy Benjamin (EastEnders); Georgia Taylor (Coronation Street)
Most Popular Drama	Bad Girls (ITV)	The Bill (ITV), A Touch of Frost (ITV); Always and Everyone (ITV)
Most Popular Serial Drama	EastEnders (BBC One)	Brookside (Channel 4), Coronation Street (ITV), Emmerdale (ITV)
Most Popular Talk Show	Parkinson (BBC One)	So Graham Norton (Channel 4)
Most Popular Entertainment Programme	My Kind of Music (ITV)	Popstars (ITV); Stars in Their Eyes (ITV); The Generation Game (BBC One)
Most Popular Entertainment Presenter	Ant & Dec (SMTV Live)	Chris Tarrant (Who Wants to Be a Millionaire?); Michael Barrymore (My Kind of Music); Jim Davidson (The Generation Game)
Most Popular Daytime Programme	This Morning (ITV)	Neighbours (BBC One/Network Ten); Countdown (Channel 4); Pet Rescue (Channel 4)
Most Popular Quiz Programme	Who Wants to Be a Millionaire? (ITV)	A Question of Sport (BBC One); The Weakest Link (BBC One); They Think It's All Over (BBC One)
Most Popular Comedy Programme	The Royle Family (BBC One)	One Foot in the Grave (BBC One); Friends (Channel 4/NBC)
Most Popular Comedy Performer	Ricky Tomlinson (The Royle Family)	Richard Wilson (One Foot in the Grave); Davina McCall (Sam's Game)
Most Popular Factual Programme	Big Brother (Channel 4)	Animal Hospital (BBC One); Ground Force (BBC One); Crimewatch UK (BBC One)
Most Popular Newcomer	Jessie Wallace (EastEnders)	Scott Wright (Coronation Street); Kacey Ainsworth (EastEnders); Tony Audenshaw (Emmerdale)
Special Recognition Award	Des O'Connor	
