= Will Poulter =

English actor (born 1993)

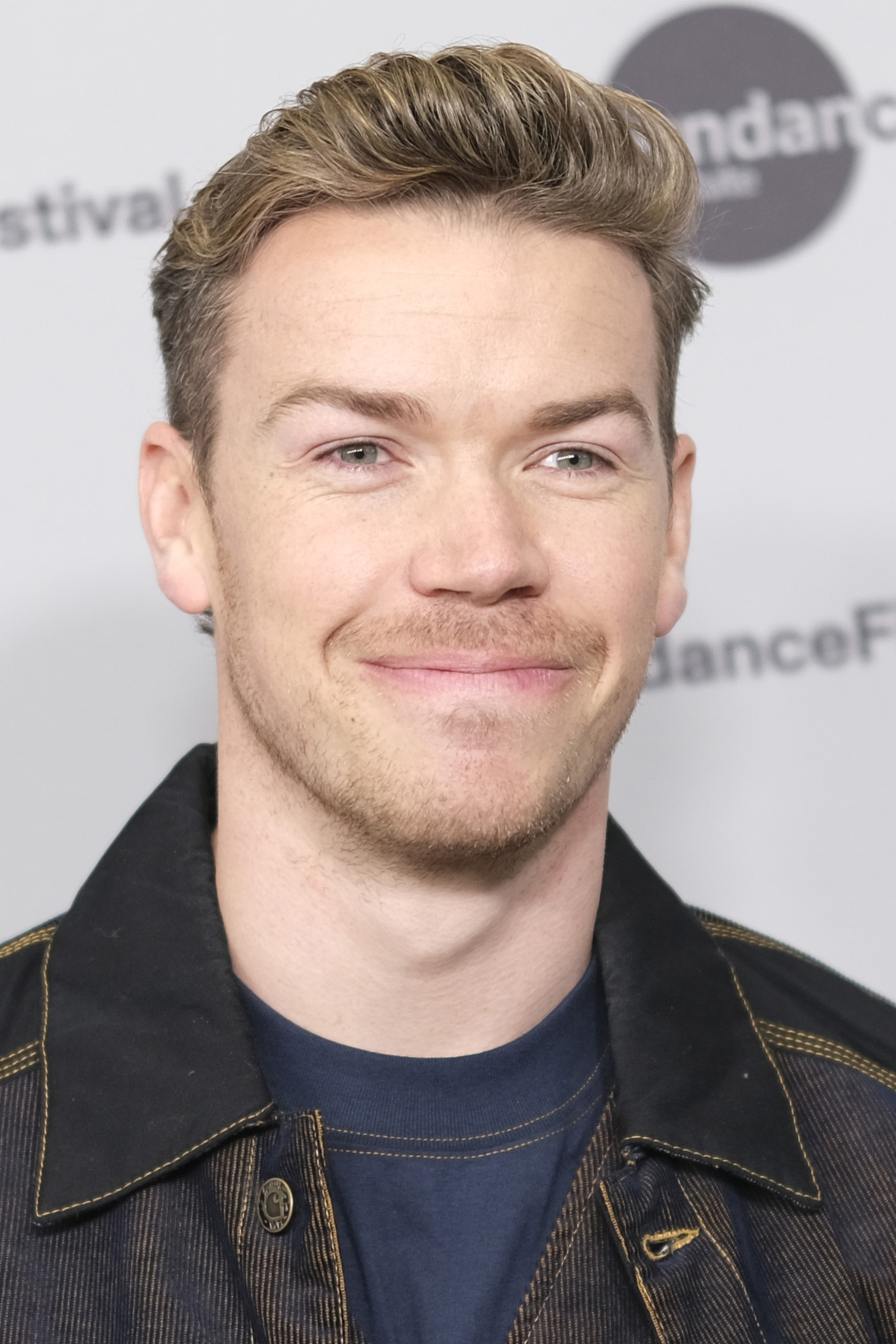
- Poulter in 2026
- Born: William Jack Poulter; 28 January 1993 (age 33); Hammersmith, London, England
- Education: University of Bristol
- Occupation: Actor
- Years active: 2007–present

William Jack Poulter (born 28 January 1993) is an English actor. Known for his work in film and television, his accolades include a British Academy Film Award as well as nominations for two Primetime Emmy Awards.

Poulter first gained recognition in School of Comedy (2009) and then for his role as Eustace Scrubb in the adventure film The Chronicles of Narnia: The Voyage of the Dawn Treader (2010). Worldwide recognition came from his starring role in the comedy film We're the Millers (2013), winning the BAFTA Rising Star Award the following year.

Poulter starred in the first and third films of the dystopian science fiction trilogy The Maze Runner (2014–2018), the period film The Revenant (2015), the crime drama film Detroit (2017), the horror film Midsommar (2019), the romantic drama On Swift Horses (2024), and the war drama Warfare (2025). He joined the Marvel Cinematic Universe as Adam Warlock in Guardians of the Galaxy Vol. 3 (2023).

On television, he received Primetime Emmy Award nominations for his roles in the Hulu miniseries Dopesick (2021) and the FX's series The Bear (2023–2026). He also acted in the Amazon Prime Video historical miniseries The Underground Railroad (2021) and the Netflix projects Black Mirror: Bandersnatch (2018) and Black Mirror: Plaything (2025).

== Early life and education ==
William Jack Poulter was born on 28 January 1993 in the Hammersmith district of London, the son of Neil Poulter, a professor of preventative cardiovascular medicine at Imperial College London, and Caroline (née Barrah), a former nurse who was brought up in Kenya.

He was a pupil at Harrodian School, a private school in Barnes, whose well-known acting graduates include George MacKay and Robert Pattinson. He struggled in school due to dyslexia and developmental co-ordination disorder, but found that he loved drama, which "gave [him] a sense of purpose".

Poulter began studying drama at the University of Bristol in 2012, before leaving after a year when he was offered a part in The Maze Runner.

== Career ==
=== 2007–2012: Early work ===
Poulter played the role of Lee Carter in the 2007 film Son of Rambow, alongside his co-star Bill Milner. He performed with other young comedic actors in School of Comedy, which aired its pilot on Channel 4's Comedy Lab on 21 August 2008, before being commissioned for a full series in 2009.

In 2010 he played the role of Eustace Scrubb in the film The Chronicles of Narnia: The Voyage of the Dawn Treader, which was filmed in Queensland, Australia, and was accompanied by some members of his family. In 2010 he appeared in the BBC Three pilot The Fades, a 60-minute supernatural thriller written by Jack Thorne. The pilot was picked up as a six-part series in 2011, of which Poulter was not included.

In 2011 Poulter starred alongside Charlie Creed-Miles as Bill's son Dean, in the British independent film Wild Bill, directed by Dexter Fletcher. The cast included a host of British talent with Leo Gregory, Neil Maskell, Liz White, Iwan Rheon, Olivia Williams, Jaime Winstone, Andy Serkis, and Sean Pertwee, and scored a perfect 100% on Rotten Tomatoes Tomatometer. In 2012 Poulter began studying drama at the University of Bristol where he lived in Badock Hall. He dropped out after a year in order to pursue acting full-time.

=== 2013–present: Breakthrough and expansion ===
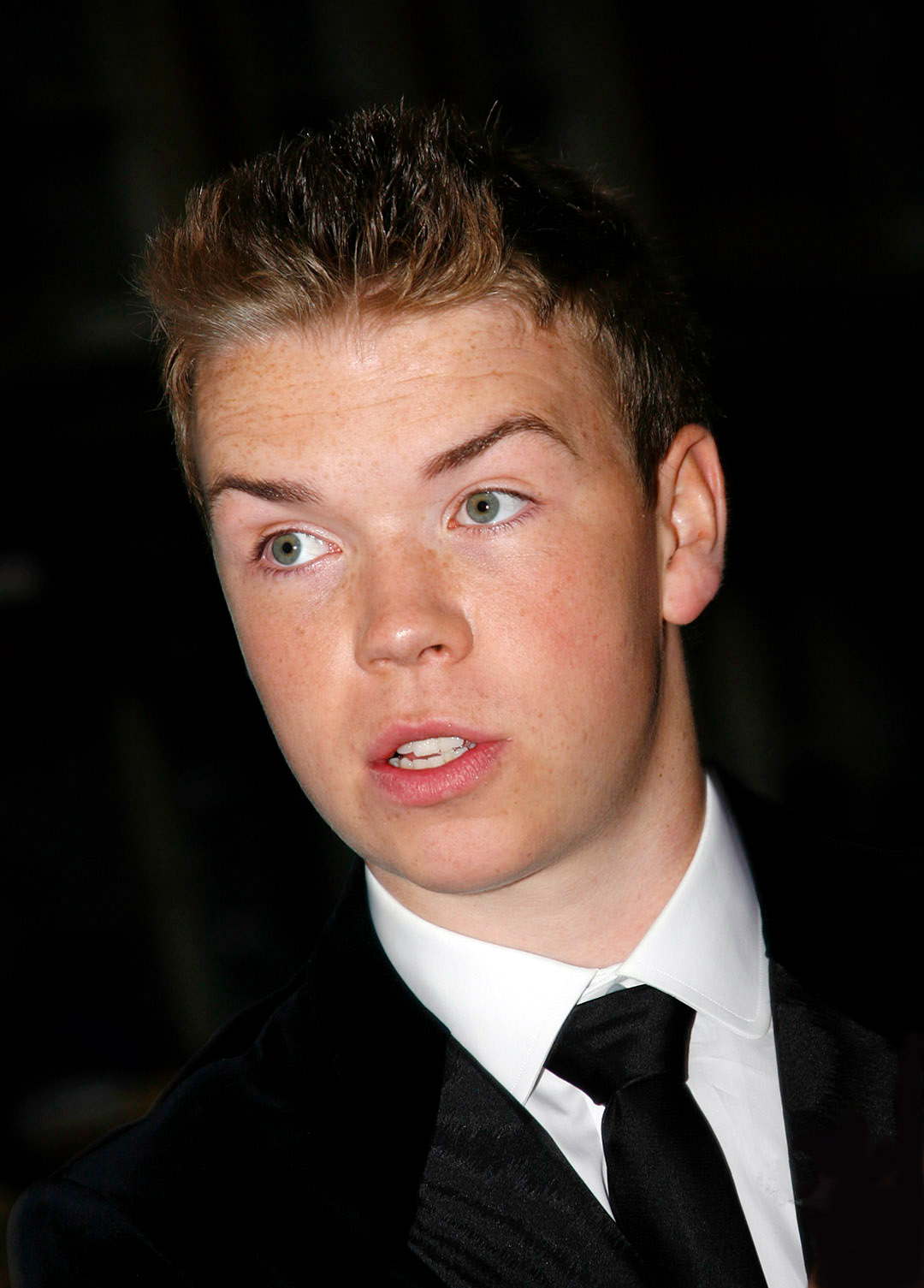
Poulter at the London premiere of We're the Millers in 2013

In 2013 Poulter played Kenny in We're the Millers, starring Jennifer Aniston and Jason Sudeikis. He also appeared as a caretaker in the music video for Rizzle Kicks' song "Skip to the Good Bit". He unsuccessfully auditioned for the role of Augustus Waters in The Fault in Our Stars.

In 2014 he played Fordy in the crime film Plastic, directed by Julian Gilbey and starring Ed Speleers, Alfie Allen, Sebastian De Souza and Emma Rigby. The same year, he played Gally in the film adaptation of The Maze Runner, alongside Dylan O'Brien and Kaya Scodelario. Poulter went on to describe the film, and his role in it, as "a turning point" in his career.

In 2015 Poulter starred as Shane in the Irish indie film Glassland, directed by Gerard Barrett and co-starring Jack Reynor and Toni Collette.

In 2014 Poulter won the BAFTA Rising Star Award, voted for by the public. The same year, he also won the MTV Movie Award for Best Breakthrough Performance and the MTV Movie Award for Best Kiss (shared with his co-stars Jennifer Aniston and Emma Roberts) for his performance in We're the Millers.

In 2014 Poulter was chosen as one of 23 upcoming actors to feature in July's issue of Vanity Fair, with all actors being named "Hollywood's Next Wave".

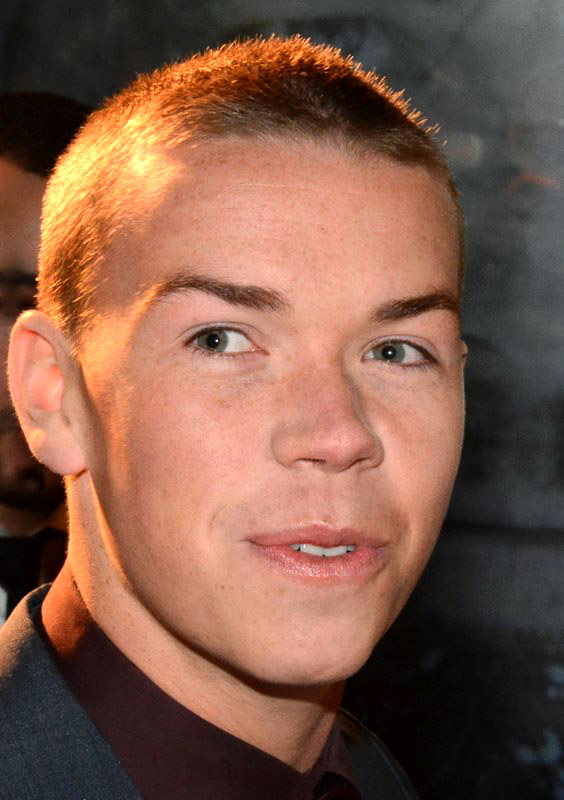
Poulter at the Paris premiere of The Revenant in 2016

Poulter played Jim Bridger in the revenge-thriller The Revenant (2015), directed by Alejandro González Iñárritu, and starring Leonardo DiCaprio and Tom Hardy. The film centres on an 1820s frontiersman on a path of vengeance against those who left him for dead after a bear mauling. In 2017 he played the racist police officer Philip Krauss in the film Detroit, about the 1967 Detroit riots. His performance was praised by Metro's Matt Prigge, who called him "terrifyingly confident".

Poulter was originally cast as Pennywise the Dancing Clown in the two supernatural horror films It (2017) and It Chapter Two (2019), both based on Stephen King's 1986 epic supernatural horror novel of the same name. However, it was announced in June 2016 that Bill Skarsgård had been cast instead as Poulter became unavailable after the departure of its initial director Cary Fukunaga.

In 2018 Poulter reprised his role as Gally in Maze Runner: The Death Cure, the third and final instalment of the Maze Runner film series. Later that year, he starred in the film The Little Stranger, as Roderick "Roddy" Ayres, a facially disfigured, haunted war veteran; and as game developer Colin Ritman in Black Mirror: Bandersnatch, a standalone interactive film of the Black Mirror television series.

In 2019, he played the character of Mark in Ari Aster's horror film Midsommar. That year, he and Asim Chaudry presented Lee Mack with the Best Entertainment Performance award at the BAFTA TV awards for Would I Lie to You. In 2020 he participated in filming The Dark Pictures Anthology: Little Hope, an interactive choice game created by Supermassive Games, in which he portrays Andrew, Anthony, and Abraham.

Poulter played the role of OxyContin sales representative Billy Cutler in Hulu's 2021 drama miniseries Dopesick. Poulter's performance was nominated for a 2022 Primetime Emmy Award for Outstanding Supporting Actor in a Limited or Anthology Series or Movie for this role.

In October 2021, Poulter was cast as Adam Warlock in Guardians of the Galaxy Vol. 3, which released on 5 May 2023. and joined the upcoming miniseries Rabbit Rabbit.

== Other ventures ==
In September 2024, Poulter was named as an ambassador of dementia charity Alzheimer's Research UK.

== Filmography ==
Key
†	Denotes works that have not yet been released

=== Film ===
Year	Title	Role	Notes	Ref.
2007	Son of Rambow	Lee Carter		
2010	The Chronicles of Narnia: The Voyage of the Dawn Treader	Eustace Scrubb		
2011	Wild Bill	Dean		
2013	We're the Millers	Kenny Rossmore		
2014	Plastic	Fordy		
2014	Glassland	Shane		
2014	The Maze Runner	Gally		
2015	A Plea for Grimsby	Jone	Short film	
2015	The Revenant	Jim Bridger		
2016	Kids in Love	Jack		
2017	War Machine	Ricky Ortega		
2017	Detroit	Philip Krauss		
2018	Maze Runner: The Death Cure	Gally		
2018	The Little Stranger	Roderick Ayres		
2019	Midsommar	Mark		
2019	Bainne	Irish Farmer	Short film	
2021	The Score	Troy		
2023	Guardians of the Galaxy Vol. 3	Adam Warlock		
2024	On Swift Horses	Lee Walker		
2025	Death of a Unicorn	Shepard		
2025	Warfare	Erik		
2026	Union County	Cody Parsons		
2026	I Love Boosters	Grayson		
2027	Saturn Return †	Nathan	Completed	

=== Television ===
Key
†	Denotes television productions that have not yet been released

Year	Title	Role	Notes	Ref.
2007	Comedy: Shuffle	Find Your Folks Presenter	2 episodes	
2008	Comedy Lab	Various	Episode: "Kids School of Comedy"	
2008	Lead Balloon	Sweet Throwing Boy	Episode: "Nuts"	
2009–2010	School of Comedy	Various characters	8 episodes; also writer	
2010	The Fades	Mac	Episode: "Pilot"	
2018	Black Mirror: Bandersnatch	Colin Ritman	Interactive Netflix television film	
2021	The Underground Railroad	Sam	Miniseries; 1 episode	
2021	Dopesick	Billy Cutler	Miniseries; 8 episodes	
2022	Why Didn't They Ask Evans?	Bobby Jones	Miniseries; 3 episodes	
2023–2026	The Bear	Luca	16 episodes	
2025	Black Mirror	Colin Ritman	Episode: "Plaything"	
2026	RuPaul's Drag Race: UK vs. the World	Guest judge	Series 3	
TBA	Beat the Reaper †	Dr. Peter Brown	Lead role; also executive producer	
TBA	Rabbit, Rabbit †	TBA	Main role	

=== Video games ===
Year	Title	Role	Notes	Ref.
2020	The Dark Pictures Anthology: Little Hope	Andrew, Anthony, and Abraham	Voice and motion capture	

=== Radio ===
Year	Title	Role	Notes	Ref.
2022	Tom Clancy's Splinter Cell: Firewall	Brody Teague	Voice	

== Awards and nominations ==
Organizations	Year	Category	Work	Result	Ref.
BAFTA Awards	2014	EE Rising Star Award		Won	
British Independent Film Awards	2008	Most Promising Newcomer	Son of Rambow	Nominated	
British Independent Film Awards	2025	Best Ensemble Performance	Warfare	Won	
Empire Awards	2014	Best Male Newcomer	We're the Millers	Nominated	
HCA TV Awards	2022	Best Supporting Actor in a Limited Series or Movie	Dopesick	Nominated	
London Film Critics' Circle	2011	Young British Performer of the Year	The Chronicles of Narnia: The Voyage of the Dawn Treader	Nominated	
London Film Critics' Circle	2013	Young British Performer of the Year	Wild Bill	Nominated	
MTV Movie Awards	2014	Breakthrough Performance	We're the Millers	Won	
MTV Movie Awards	2014	Best Kiss (shared with Emma Roberts and Jennifer Aniston)	We're the Millers	Won	
MTV Movie Awards	2014	Best Musical Moment	We're the Millers	Nominated	
MTV Movie Awards	2015	Best Fight (shared with Dylan O'Brien)	The Maze Runner	Won	
Phoenix Film Critics Society	2010	Best Youth Actor in a Leading or Supporting Role – Male	The Chronicles of Narnia: The Voyage of the Dawn Treader	Nominated	
Primetime Emmy Awards	2022	Outstanding Supporting Actor in a Limited Series or Movie	Dopesick	Nominated	
Primetime Emmy Awards	2024	Outstanding Guest Actor in a Comedy Series	The Bear (episode: "Honeydew")	Nominated	
Online Film & Television Association	2022	Best Supporting Actor in a Motion Picture or Limited Series	Dopesick	Nominated	
Saturn Awards	2011	Best Performance by a Younger Actor	The Chronicles of Narnia: The Voyage of the Dawn Treader	Nominated	
Teen Choice Awards	2014	Choice Movie Liplock (Note: shared with Emma Roberts and Jennifer Aniston)	We're the Millers	Nominated	
Young Artist Awards	2009	Best Leading Young Performers – International Feature Film (Note: shared with Bill Milner)	Son of Rambow	Nominated	
Young Artist Awards	2011	Best Young Ensemble Cast – Feature Film (Note: shared with Georgie Henley and Skandar Keynes)	The Chronicles of Narnia: The Voyage of the Dawn Treader	Nominated	
