= Andy Harries =

British producer (born 1954)

Andy Harries OBE
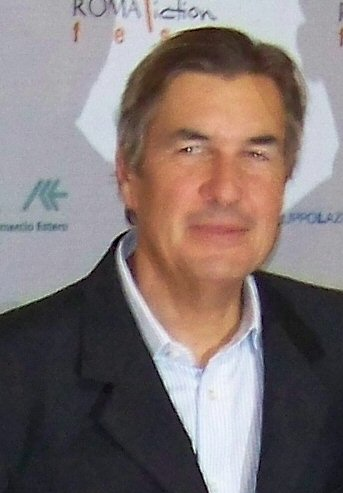
- Harries in July 2009
- Born: Andrew Harries; 7 April 1954 (age 72); Inverness, Scotland
- Occupation: Chairman
- Employer: Left Bank Pictures
- Spouse: Rebecca Frayn (m. 1992)
- Children: 3, including Jack and Finn

Andrew Harries OBE (born 7 April 1954) is chairman and co-founder of Left Bank Pictures, a UK based production company formed in 2007. In a career spanning four decades he has produced television dramas including The Royle Family, Cold Feet, the revivals of Prime Suspect and Cracker, as well as the BAFTA-winning television play The Deal.

In 2006 he received an Academy Award nomination as producer of The Queen, which saw Helen Mirren win Best Actress for her role, and in 2007, the British Academy of Film and Television Arts awarded him the Special Award in Honour of Alan Clarke. 2011 saw the Royal Television Society confer a Fellowship on Harries for outstanding contributions to the broadcasting industry. He has been described by Broadcast Magazine as "one of the UK's most outstanding drama producers".

Since 2007, Left Bank has produced the television series Wallander, Strike Back, Outlander and The Replacement amongst many other acclaimed dramas.

In 2016, they released The Crown, the first American-British television series produced exclusively for Netflix. The Golden Globe, SAG and Emmy winning series, written by Peter Morgan, has been very well received by critics and audiences.

Their fourth feature film, Dark River was released on 23 February 2018. It was written and directed by Clio Barnard, stars Ruth Wilson, Mark Stanley, and Sean Bean. It screened in the Platform section at the 2017 Toronto International Film Festival.

Left Bank Pictures has won numerous industry awards, including Best Independent Production Company at the Edinburgh TV Awards (2017) and Broadcast Awards (2018).

== Family ==
Harries is married to filmmaker and writer Rebecca Frayn, daughter of the playwright and novelist Michael Frayn (now married to biographer Claire Tomalin). Their twin sons, Jack and Finn, ran the JacksGap YouTube channel from 2011 until 2017.

== Early life and education ==
Andy Harries was born in Inverness, Scotland, on 7 April 1954 and grew up in Peterborough, England, receiving primary education at West Town Primary School until 1961, and secondary education at the public Oakham School. He grew up aspiring to be a war correspondent in Vietnam, or an investigative journalist; his idols were Harold Evans, Jon Swain and John Pilger. He left college at the age of 17 with poor A Level results and became a trainee reporter on the Peterborough Evening Telegraph newspaper. His time on the newspaper raised his awareness of politics, and he sought to further his understanding of it by studying at university. He applied to various northern universities to break away from his southern middle-class lifestyle, and was accepted at Hull University.

Harries stayed at Hull until he was 21, though continued to work at the Evening Telegraph during holidays. At university he developed an interest in music journalism and found an outlet for this by writing reviews for Melody Maker.

== Early career (1976–1981) ==
After leaving Hull, Harries moved to London to work for the Southern News Service news agency, writing diary pieces for the Daily Mail and News of the World from 1975 to 1976. On the advice of a friend, he applied for a position as a researcher for Granada Television in Manchester. He did not understand the appeal of television production, and as a result he was turned away at two interviews before being hired in 1976.

Shortly after being hired he was taken aside by the news producer and asked to read the on-air bulletin for the nightly broadcast. He read the news for three months until one night when he condensed a six-minute bulletin into three minutes. He attributed this to stage fright, which caused him to speak too fast. The rest of the production crew were not ready to move on to the next news items, leaving Harries standing in silence for several minutes. Harries recalled in a 2007 interview that Steve Morrison, the producer of the bulletin, called him into his office and berated him, telling him he did not deserve to be on television and that he would no longer be reading the news. Morrison's remarks angered Harries to such a point that he assaulted the man. Aware that he was going to lose his job, he contacted a Granada colleague who got him a new job at Granada's London centre, which he took up at the age of 23.

Pursuing his interest in investigative journalism, Harries worked as a researcher on the current affairs programme World in Action, where he met Paul Greengrass. While Greengrass achieved success in exposing alleged corruption involving Manchester United F.C. chairman Louis Edwards, Harries investigated irregularities in the British Singles Chart. Greengrass's investigation was a success, though Harries admits his own programme "didn't make a blind bit of difference".

== Freelance and Channel X (1981–1992) ==
In 1981, Harries left Granada and moved into freelance producing and directing. He directed the documentary series Africa in 1984 before beginning a collaboration with Paul Yule, with whom he made four films in Peru between 1985 and 1989—Martin Chambi and the Heirs of the Incas, Our God the Condor, Iquitos, and Mario Vargas Llosa: The Novelist Who Would Be President—and working on editions of The South Bank Show and Arena. While directing a corporate video for BT he met Jonathan Ross, who was his assistant for the day. Ross invited Harries to direct a pilot for a chat show he and Alan Marke had developed that was based on Late Night with David Letterman. The pilot was a success and Ross found a television audience with The Last Resort with Jonathan Ross, which first aired in 1988.

Harries formed a production company called Sleeping Partners with Greengrass in the latter part of the decade, which produced Ross's The Incredibly Strange Film Show and comedian Lenny Henry's Lenny Live and Unleashed film. The latter was directed by Harries and was edited together from a number of performances by Henry at the Hackney Empire in 1989. The Guardian's film critic called the direction "unobtrusive".

The 1990s began with more direction and production for Ross and Marke's Channel X production company; in 1991 he made the documentary Viva Elvis! and executive produced Middlemarch Films' The Ghosts of Oxford Street, a musical about Oxford Street's history. The script for Ghosts was written by Harries's wife, Rebecca Frayn. The same year, he developed a script with Peter Morgan called Bhundu Beat, a film described by Variety as "a bizarre remake of A Hard Day's Night featuring the briefly fashionable Zimbabwean band the Bhundu Boys and Brit comic Lenny Henry". With a development budget of £2,000, Harries sent Morgan on a research trip to Zimbabwe, taking a circuitous route that lasted for three days. Bhundu Beat was never made.

== Second Granada career (1992–2007) ==
=== Controller of Comedy ===
At the 1991 Edinburgh Festival Fringe, Harries personally bought the television rights to An Evening with Gary Lineker, a comedy play written by Arthur Smith and Chris England based around a group of England fans at the 1990 FIFA World Cup. Smith bet Harries £100 that he would not be able to get the adaptation on television before the next World Cup. Harries tried selling Smith and England's screenplay to the BBC, Channel 4, LWT, Yorkshire Television and Central Independent Television to no avail. The BBC offered to produce it as a studio play but Harries wanted a full-length film to distinguish it from the original play, which was by then playing at London's West End. He was reluctant to offer the script to Granada because of his previous experience with the company. However, in 1992 he was accepted the position of controller of comedy at Granada and An Evening with Gary Lineker was made. Harries was disappointed that pressure from Granada's management had forced him to replace so many of the original stage cast; England was replaced by Paul Merton, leaving Caroline Quentin as the only original actor. The Edinburgh Fringe played an important role in Harries's early commissions at Granada; he was not fond of traditional styles of comedy and was always looking for alternative comedians. These included Caroline Aherne, Steve Coogan and John Thomson (though Coogan "got away" from him after the BBC offered to produce his Alan Partridge shows). After the failure of Bhundu Beat, Harries commissioned Peter Morgan to write "Mickey Love" in 1993, one of a series of short comedy films for the Rik Mayall series Rik Mayall Presents.

In 1994, after turning down an offer for "the number three position" at Channel 4 and extending his contract with Granada to become controller of entertainment and comedy, he commissioned The Mrs Merton Show from Aherne. In negotiating a second series with the BBC a few years later, another series from Aherne was included; The Royle Family, a sitcom featuring a working-class northern family, aired on BBC One from 1998 to 2000. The first two episodes were filmed with a studio audience, something Harries did not approve of. He scrapped these episodes and had them refilmed without a laugh track. The Royle Family returned for a one-off special in 2006, an achievement Harries described as giving him no greater pleasure. A spin-off of The Mrs Merton Show was commissioned by Harries from Aherne in 1999; Mrs Merton and Malcolm was based around Mrs Merton and her son Malcolm, played by Craig Cash. The programme was Aherne's first critical failure, which Harries blamed on the BBC One schedulers.

In 1995 he commissioned a comedy drama on spec from Mike Bullen, a BBC radio producer and first-time writer. Like An Evening with Gary Lineker, The Perfect Match was based around football and received respectable reviews. Harries was interested in producing more comedy dramas, based on the success of American programmes like Thirtysomething, and assigned Granada producer Christine Langan to work with Bullen. Langan and Bullen developed Cold Feet, which was broadcast in 1997 and was commissioned for a full series in 1998. It won the British Academy Television Award for Best Drama Series in 2002, which Harries collected with Bullen and Spencer Campbell. Harries executive produced two more series of Bullen's; Life Begins (2004–2006) and All About George (2005).

His first panel show produced came in 1999 with Mel and Sue's Casting Couch. The show was Mel and Sue's first programme made for ITV following the success of Light Lunch for Channel 4. Casting Couch had low viewing figures and was not recommissioned. It was one of several comedies commissioned by Harries in 1999 that were produced by Justin Judd. Others included Dark Ages and My Wonderful Life. Judd and Harries began developing Dark Ages—a sitcom set at the turn of the 2nd millennium—in 1997 but could not make it work with the writer at the time. They proposed it to Red Dwarf writer Rob Grant, who liked the idea, and wrote all six episodes. Dark Ages aired nightly during the Christmas 1999 period. A second series was proposed—Harries said it would "hit its stride" then—but ITV did not recommission it. My Wonderful Life was another ratings disaster. Harries blamed ITV Network Centre and publicly criticised the network, courting the ire of its director of channels David Liddiment.

=== Drama and film brief ===
In September 2000, Harries's portfolio was significantly expanded when he was appointed Granada's controller of drama, following the resignations of Sue Hogg and Simon Lewis. 2002 commissions included Doctor Zhivago and Henry VIII. ITV would provide only £750,000 for each hour of the serials, so Harries approached US broadcaster WGBH to make up the remaining funds. Following the merging of Granada Films with Granada Productions in 2002, Harries's brief was expanded to include films.

2003 was a significant year for Harries's drama output; Peter Morgan approached Granada with an idea for a drama documenting the conjectured pact between Tony Blair and Gordon Brown before the 1994 Labour Party leadership election. Granada's chief executive Charles Allen was not keen on producing The Deal but Harries and John Whiston persuaded him otherwise. ITV initially agreed to show it but pulled out before filming began. Harries offered it to Channel 4, who took it within 24 hours. The Deal was a critical success and won the British Academy Television Award for Best Single Drama. That same year Harries brought back the drama serial Prime Suspect, which had not been produced since the star Helen Mirren quit in 1995. Mirren agreed to return for Prime Suspect: The Last Witness only if it was "about something". Two years later it returned for the seventh and final serial, entitled The Final Act, in which Jane Tennison, Mirren's character, confronts her alcoholism in a sub-plot. Lynda La Plante, who created Prime Suspect in 1989, was critical of the decision to "make [Tennison] a drunk", though Harries rebutted, saying, "Lynda was the one who started Jane Tennison drinking heavily—it's not out of character". In 2004, Harries was ranked number eleven on a list of the most powerful figures in British TV drama, compiled by industry experts for the Radio Times.

During the read-throughs for The Last Witness Harries watched other actors and production staff react to Mirren as if she was "like the Queen". Already in pre-production was a follow-up to The Deal that would focus on the royal family in the week following the death of Diana, Princess of Wales. Peter Morgan was due to return as the writer, Stephen Frears was signed on as director and Harries suggested to Mirren that she play the Queen. Mirren agreed and the film, co-produced by Granada and Pathé, was released in September 2006. Among the numerous awards for which it was nominated were the BAFTA Award for Best Film and the Academy Award for Best Picture (the former it won). Despite the success of the film, Harries once again expressed disappointment with ITV for not giving enough backing. In an interview the month before The Queen was released he criticised the management of ITV for being deeply complacent and arrogant, and expressed disappointment that drama on the channel was not as good as it once was. At the end of the year he announced that he would not be renewing his contract with the company. Entertainment industry commentators suggested that he would set up his own independent production company.

== Left Bank Pictures (2007–present) ==
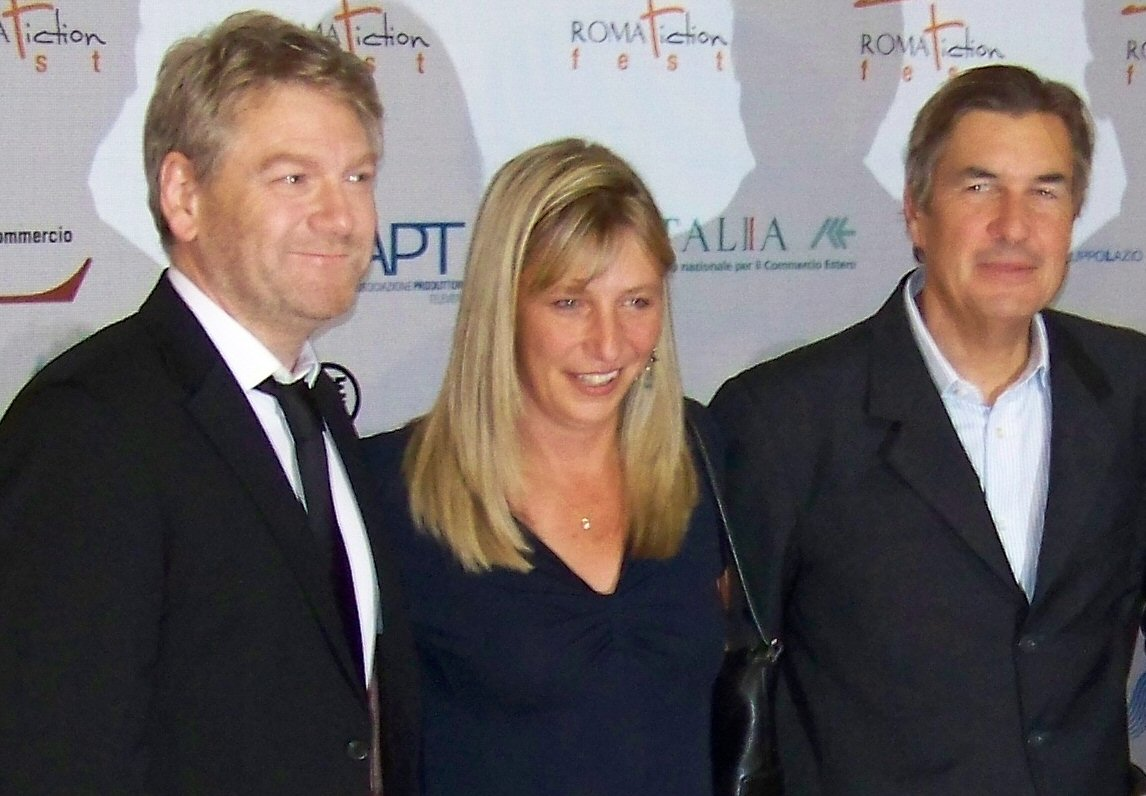
Harries in 2009 with Left Bank Pictures co-founder Marigo Kehoe and Wallander star Kenneth Branagh

Rumours that he would start his own company, possibly with Caroline Aherne, had circulated since the 1990s. The predictions came to fruition in May 2007 when Harries announced the formation of Left Bank Pictures, which BBC Worldwide immediately took a 25% share in. Left Bank was the first British production house to receive investment from BBC Worldwide, and there was some concern that there was a conflict of interest for the publicly funded BBC; in The Guardian, Steve Hewlett wrote that the deal was a "back-door way of getting around the rules preventing the BBC producing programmes for its British rivals". Hewlett also commented that the investment might limit Left Bank's future prospects, as it was "tied to" the BBC. At Left Bank, Harries proposed to produce two features films per year, as well as several television series. The company's first television commission is Wallander, a three-part series based on Henning Mankell's Kurt Wallander novels. The series was made in association with Swedish company Yellow Bird for the BBC. It was broadcast in November and December 2008, and a second series followed in 2010.

In 2009, Left Bank's first feature film, The Damned United (adapted by Peter Morgan from the David Peace novel) was released. Also broadcast in 2009 was the comedy series School of Comedy and the crime drama Father & Son. Comedy drama series Married Single Other was filmed for ITV and was broadcast in 2010. Harries executive produced the third part of Peter Morgan's "Blair trilogy", The Special Relationship, for HBO Films and BBC Films. It was first broadcast on the HBO networks in the United States in May 2010.

On 23 August 2012, Sony Pictures Television acquired a majority stake in Left Bank.

In 2017, Left Bank produced The Replacement for BBC One which went on to win Best Television Scripted at BAFTA Scotland.

The Crown is Left Bank's biggest project to date, the first American-British television series produced exclusively for Netflix. The series has received wide critical acclaim, awards include; Golden Globes for Best Television Series (Drama) and Best Performance by an Actress in a Television Series (Drama), Screen Actor's Guild Award for Claire Foy, Outstanding Performance by a Female Actor in a Drama Series in both 2017 and 2018 and an Primetime Emmy Award for John Lithgow, Outstanding Supporting Actor – Drama Series.

Left Bank's fourth feature film Dark River was released on 23 February 2018. Written and directed by Clio Barnard, it stars Ruth Wilson, Mark Stanley, and Sean Bean. It screened in the Platform section at the 2017 Toronto International Film Festival.

Left Bank Pictures has won various industry awards, including Best Independent Production Company at the Edinburgh TV Awards (2017) and Broadcast Awards (2018).

== Honours and awards ==
Left Bank's inception lead to Harries being listed in The Guardian's Media Top 100, making his entry at number 66. At the end of the year he was listed in Broadcast's Top 100 Producers, being described as "one of the UK's most outstanding drama producers". In May 2007, the British Academy of Film and Television Arts awarded him the Special Award in Honour of Alan Clarke. In December 2009, the Radio Times ranked him at number six in their "Faces of 2010" feature, a compilation of "the biggest names and the coming stars in the year ahead". In Broadcast's Top 100 for 2010, Harries was ranked at number two in the executive producers category. He received an Academy Award nomination as producer of The Queen which saw a run of six Academy Award nominations with Helen Mirren memorably winning Best Actress.

The Royal Television Society conferred a Fellowship on Harries on 23 May 2011 for outstanding contributions to the broadcasting industry.

Harries was appointed Officer of the Order of the British Empire (OBE) in the 2019 Birthday Honours for services to film and television.

== Personal life ==
Harries has been married to writer and director Rebecca Frayn since July 1992. The couple have three children; identical twins Jack and Finn born in 1993, and Emmy Lou.

After producing a South Bank Show profile and The Ghosts of Oxford Street, Harries remained good friends with Malcolm McLaren, and spoke at his funeral in April 2010.

== Filmography ==
Television and films produced
Year(s)	Title	Role	Description
1980	World in Action	Researcher	Television documentary series
1982	Disappearing World	Researcher	Television documentary series
1983	Twenty Twenty Vision	Director	2 episodes of television series: "Boy Soldiers"; "Scramble For Cable"
1984	Africa	Director	Television documentary series (Note: Directed and produced with Paul Yule.)
1984–1988	The South Bank Show	Director, producer	4 episodes of television series: "Malcolm McLaren" (1984); "Truman Capote" (1986); "Penguin Cafe Orchestra" (1987); "Lenny Henry" (1988)
1985	Food for Thought	Director	Television documentary series
1986	South of Watford	Director, producer	2 episodes of television series: "The Mutoid Waste Company"; "Animation City"
1987	A Short Sharp Shock	Director, producer	Television documentary
1987	Arena	Director, producer	2 episode of television series: "Martin Chambi and the Heirs of the Incas"; "Our God the Condor"
1988	The Incredibly Strange Film Show	Director, producer	1 series of television series
1989	Lenny Live and Unleashed	Director, producer	Feature film
1989	Son of Incredibly Strange Film Show	Director, producer	1 series of television series
1990	True Stories	Director, producer	1 episode of television series: "Iquitos"
1990	Omnibus	Director, producer	1 episode of television series: "Mario Vargas Llosa"
1991	Jonathan Ross Presents for One Week Only	Director, producer	1 series of television series
1991	Viva Elvis!	Director, producer	Television documentary
1991	The Ghosts of Oxford Street	Executive producer	Television film
1993–1995	Surgical Spirit	Executive producer	3 series of television series
1993–1995	Rik Mayall Presents	Executive producer	2 series of television series
1993	Full Monty	Executive producer	1 series of television series
1993	Comic Timing: That Nice Mrs Merton	Executive producer	Television pilot
1994	The House of Windsor	Executive producer	1 series of television series
1994	An Evening with Gary Lineker	Executive producer	Television film
1995–1998	The Mrs Merton Show	Executive producer	5 series of television series
1995	The World of Lee Evans	Executive producer	1 series of television series
1995	The Perfect Match	Executive producer	Television film
1996	True Love	Executive producer	Television film
1997–1998	Holding the Baby	Executive producer	2 series of television series
1997	Comedy Premieres: Cold Feet	Executive producer	Television pilot
1997	Comedy Premieres: The Chest	Executive producer	Television pilot
1997–1999	My Wonderful Life	Executive producer	3 series of television series
1997	Comedy Premieres: The Grimleys	Executive producer	Television pilot
1997	Jack Dee's Sunday Service	Executive producer	1 series of television series
1997	Comedy Premieres: King Leek	Executive producer	Television pilot
1998	The Misadventures of Margaret	Executive producer	Feature film
1998–2000	The Royle Family	Executive producer	3 series of television series
1998–2003	Cold Feet	Executive producer	5 series of television series
1999	Mrs Merton and Malcolm	Executive producer	1 series of television series
1999	Passion Killers	Executive producer	Television pilot
1999–2001	The Grimleys	Executive producer	3 series of television series
1999	Mel and Sue's Casting Couch	Executive producer	Television chat show
1999	Dark Ages	Executive producer	1 series of television series
2000–2001	Bob Martin	Executive producer	2 series of television series
2000	Back Passage to India	Director, executive producer	Television mockumentary
2000	Metropolis	Executive producer	1 series of television series
2000	Safe as Houses	Executive producer	Television film
2002	The Jury	Executive producer	6-part television serial
2002–2003	The Forsyte Saga	Executive producer	2 series of television series
2002	Lenny Blue	Executive producer	2-part television serial
2002	Doctor Zhivago	Executive producer	3-part television serial
2003	Cold Feet: The Final Call	Executive producer	Television documentary
2003	Watermelon	Executive producer	Television film
2003	The Deal	Executive producer	Television film
2003	Henry VIII	Executive producer	2-part television serial
2003–2006	Prime Suspect	Executive producer	2 series of television series
2004–2006	Donovan	Executive producer	2 series of television series
2004–2006	Life Begins	Executive producer	3 series of television series
2004–2006	Murder City	Executive producer	2 series of television series
2004	Island at War	Executive producer	1 series of television series
2004	Wall of Silence	Executive producer	Television film
2004	Dirty Filthy Love	Executive producer	Television film
2004	Whose Baby?	Executive producer	Television film
2004	Christmas Lights	Executive producer	Television film
2005	Bloodlines	Executive producer	Television film
2005	Planespotting	Executive producer	Television film
2005	The Walk	Executive producer	Television film
2005	Colditz	Executive producer	2-part television serial
2005	Pierrepoint	Executive producer	Television film with territorial theatrical release
2005	All About George	Executive producer	1 series of television series
2005–2006	Vincent	Executive producer	2 series of television series
2005	Secret Smile	Executive producer	2-part television serial
2006	Eleventh Hour	Executive producer	1 series of television series
2006	Northern Lights	Executive producer	1 series of television series
2006	The Incredible Journey of Mary Bryant	Executive producer	2-part television serial
2006	The Street	Executive producer	1 series of television series
2006	See No Evil: The Moors Murders	Executive producer	2-part television serial
2006	The Kindness of Strangers	Executive producer	2-part television serial
2006	The Queen	Producer	Feature film
2006	The Girls Who Came to Stay	Executive producer	Television film
2006	Cracker	Executive producer	1 episode of television series: "Nine Eleven"
2006	Behind the Scenes: Cracker	Executive producer	Television documentary
2006	What We Did on Our Holiday	Executive producer	Television film
2006	Longford	Executive producer	Television film
2006	We Love The Royle Family	Executive producer	Television documentary
2006	The Royle Family: The Queen of Sheba	Executive producer	Television episode
2006	Losing Gemma	Executive producer	2-part television serial
2006	Perfect Parents	Executive producer	Television film
2007	Dead Clever: The Life and Times of Julia Bottomley	Executive producer	Television film
2007	Northanger Abbey	Executive producer	Television film
2007	City Lights	Executive producer	1 series of television series
2008	Comedy Lab: Kids' School of Comedy	Executive producer	Television pilot
2008–2012	Wallander	Executive producer	3 series of television series
2009	The Damned United	Producer	Feature film
2009	Father & Son	Executive producer	4-part television serial
2009–2010	School of Comedy	Executive producer	2 series of television series
2010	Married Single Other	Executive producer	1 series of television series
2010–2020	Strike Back	Executive producer	8 series of television series (76 episodes)
2010	The Special Relationship	Executive producer	Television film with territorial theatrical release
2010–2016	DCI Banks	Executive producer	3 series of television series (32 episodes)
2011	Zen	Executive producer	1 series of television series
2011–2013	Mad Dogs	Executive producer	3 series of television series (12 episodes)
2011	The Lady	Producer	Feature film
2012	All in Good Time	Producer	Feature film
2012	Cardinal Burns	Executive producer	1 series of television series
2012	Loving Miss Hatto	Executive producer	Television film
2013	The Ice Cream Girls	Executive producer	3-part television serial
2014	Tommy Cooper: Not Like That, Like This	Executive producer	TV movie
2014–present	Outlander	Executive producer	7 series of television series (91 episodes)
2015–2016	Mad Dogs	Executive producer	1 series of television series (11 episodes)
2016–2023	The Crown	Executive producer	6 series of television series (60 episodes)
2017	The Halcyon	Executive producer	1 series of television series (8 episodes)
2017	Madiba	Executive producer	3-part television miniseries
2017	The Replacement	Executive producer	3-part television serial
2017	Oasis	Executive producer	Feature film
2017	Dark River	Executive producer	Feature film
2018	Stan & Ollie	Executive producer	Feature film
2018	Origin	Executive producer	1 series of television series
2020	Misbehaviour	Executive producer	Feature film
2020	Quiz	Executive producer	3-part television serial
2020	White Lines	Executive producer	1 series of television series
2020	Sitting in Limbo	Executive producer	Television documentary film
2021	Behind Her Eyes	Executive producer	6-part limited television series
2022	The Fear Index	Executive producer	1 series of television series
2022	Three Pines	Executive producer	1 series of television series
2022	Without Sin	Executive producer	1 series of television series
2023	Who Is Erin Carter?	Executive producer	1 series of television series
2023	Everything Now	Executive producer	1 series of television series
2024	Insomnia	Executive producer	1 series of television series
2025–present	This City Is Ours	Executive producer	1 series of television series
2025–present	Dept. Q	Executive producer	1 series of television series
