= Charlotte Moore (TV executive) =

British television executive

Charlotte Moore OBE
- Born: 19 June 1968 (age 58)
- Education: University of Bristol (BA)
- Title: Controller of BBC One (2013–2016); BBC Director of Content (2016–2020); BBC Chief Content Officer (2020–2025); Left Bank Pictures Chief Executive Officer (2025–present)

Charlotte Alexandra Perry OBE (née Moore; born 19 June 1968) is a British television executive who is the chief executive officer of Left Bank Pictures. She was previously BBC's Chief Content Officer, having been appointed to this role in September 2020, having been Director of Content since early 2016 when she assumed responsibility for all of the BBC's television channels after the controller posts were abolished. Moore was Controller of BBC One from 2013 to 2016, in the position of which she was reported to be in charge of a budget of more than £1 billion.

Moore has, since 2005, been a trustee of the Grierson Trust, of which she is a vice-chair. She was made a Fellow of the Royal Television Society in 2016.

== Early life ==
Moore was born in June 1968 and grew up in Surrey. She attended Wycombe Abbey, an independent girls' boarding school in Buckinghamshire, and graduated with a Bachelor of Arts in History from the University of Bristol in 1990.

== Career ==
=== Earlier career ===
Moore joined Ideal World as a producer-director of documentaries in 2002. As a freelancer in this joint role, her credits included "Lagos Airport", RTS award-winning Living With Cancer and Great Britons: Churchill. She was appointed head of documentaries for Muriel Gray's Ideal World company in February 2004, and then head of contemporary factual at IWC Media, as it became after its merger with Wark Clements, in 2005.

Moore became a commissioning executive for documentaries at the BBC in 2006, responsible for the Emmy award-winning Stephen Fry's Secret Life of the Manic Depressive and Bafta award-winning Evicted. After a period as temporary charge, she formally became the commissioning editor of Documentaries in May 2009, responsible for 220 hours of programming per annum across the BBC's four television channels with an annual budget of £30 million by 2011.

In this role she gave the go-ahead for BBC2's Welcome to Lagos, Protecting Our Children, a programme on assisted suicide, Terry Pratchett: Choosing to Die, 7/7 One Day in London, Inside Claridges and The Great British Bake Off among others.

=== Controller of BBC One ===
In February 2013 Moore was appointed acting controller of Daytime Television for the BBC, and had been acting controller of BBC One since Danny Cohen's promotion to Director of BBC Television on 7 May. She became controller of BBC One in June 2013.

At the time Moore became BBC One controller, the media commentator Maggie Brown wrote that "her appointment signals a rising appreciation of collaborative team players with an eye on the greater good of the BBC".

=== BBC Director of Content ===
In January 2016, it was announced that the controller posts for the BBC channels were to be abolished and that Moore would assume the overall post for all of them, including responsibility for the iPlayer, later in the year. She became the BBC's first Director of Content.

In May 2020 she was shortlisted to become the next Director-General of the BBC after Tony Hall's departure.

=== BBC Chief Content Officer and appointment to BBC Board ===
On 3 September 2020, it was announced that Moore had been made BBC Chief Content Officer as of that date, joining the BBC Board in the process and becoming the senior creative lead for the corporation's content and audiences apart from the news, nations and regions.

=== Left Bank Pictures Chief Executive Officer and Sony Pictures Television International Production Executive VP, Creative Director ===
On 27 February 2025, it was announced that Moore would leave the BBC to join Sony Pictures Television as both Executive Vice President, Creative Director of its International Production division as well as chief executive officer of Left Bank Pictures, succeeding co-founder Andy Harries who transitioned to the position of chairman, in effect starting September 2025.

== Personal life ==
Moore is married to cinematographer Johann Perry, with whom she has two children. She was appointed an Officer of the Order of the British Empire (OBE) in the 2026 New Year Honours for services to public service broadcasting.

Media offices
Preceded by Danny Cohen	Controller of BBC One; 2013–2016	Succeeded by Position abolished
Preceded by Position established	BBC Director of Content; 2016–2020	Succeeded by Position abolished
Preceded by Position established	BBC Chief Content Officer; 2020–present	Succeeded by Incumbent
