= Trespass (novel) =

2010 novel by British author Rose Tremain

- Author: Rose Tremain
- Publication date: 2010

Trespass is a 2010 novel by British author Rose Tremain. The novel is set in a small town in Cévennes and concerns two pairs of mixed gender dysfunctional adult siblings, one French and one English who become entangled in a dispute over property.

== Plot ==
Audrun is an elderly woman who lives in a small shack she has inherited in a small town in Cévennes where she has always lived. Her older brother terrorized her when they were children and as an adult lives a lonely life in their childhood home, which he has partially ruined through hoarding. When he asks Audrun to come help him clean out the house she discovers that he has plans to sell it for roughly half a million euros.

Anthony Verey is an elderly antiques dealer who is quickly becoming insolvent. Realizing his life is stagnating he calls his sister, Veronica, who is living in Cévennes with her lover, Kitty, while they collaborate on a book. To Kitty's distress, Veronica offers to let Anthony stay with them indefinitely until he feels better. Anthony forms the idea of buying a home near Veronica and permanently resettling.

Aramon, Audrun's brother, continues to make her life hell, telling her that the small shack she built near their childhood home is an eyesore and if any of it crosses onto his property line he will tear it down. Because the shack was hastily built Audrun is unsure of its legality. She begins to contemplate murdering her brother.

Anthony visits Aramon's house, the Mas Lunel, which he falls in love with but refuses to buy after seeing Audrun's shack. He goes to visit another property and never returns. Veronica launches an extensive search for him and as she does her relationship with Kitty, who hated Anthony, falls apart.

In the meantime Aramon has been getting increasingly ill, experiencing blackouts which he had much earlier in his life as a teenager when he and his father began raping Audrun after Bernadette, Audrun and Aramon's mother died. Audrun suggests to Aramon that Anthony was there the day he disappeared but as Aramon was experiencing a prolonged blackout he cannot remember if this is true or not. Audrun continues to feed Aramon's paranoia and, after he finds Anthony's car in his garage, he withdraws the house for sale and bars all visitors. When a family friend asks if her daughter can bring some schoolchildren on their property for a picnic Aramon refuses, but Audrun permits them to lunch on her side of the property. One of the children then discovers Anthony's body in a pool of water.

When the police come to investigate Audrun deliberately lets slip that she saw Anthony and Aramon together a second time. In actuality, after an unsatisfactory viewing of another country home, Anthony had decided to buy Mas Lunel and Audrun, wanting to block the sale, persuaded him to accompany her to the river where she murdered him, planted the body in a small pool, and then hid his car in Aramon's garage. Aramon is arrested but Audrun's victory is short lived. After a dry summer season forest fires break out in the region and one of them destroys the Mas Lunel. Audrun decides to raze Mas Lunel and let nature take over the land.

In prison Aramon is treated for ulcers, makes a few friends, and finally approaches something close to happiness for the first time in years. One day Audrun decides to visit him, bringing him a branch of white cherry blossom which they both remember as a positive memory from when they were children. Aramon finally apologizes to Audrun for his abuse.

== Characters ==
- Audrun Lunel, a poor French woman who has lived in Rouasse her entire life
- Aramon Lunel, Audrun's abusive brother
- Anthony Verey, an ageing English antiques dealer
- Veronica Verey, Anthony's sister, a professional landscaper
- Kitty Meadows, Veronica's lover, a watercolour artist

== Critical reception ==
The novel received nearly unanimous critical praise. The Globe and Mail praised Tremain as "a writer in command of her craft." The New York Times declared Tremain's style "authoritative". The Guardian had some reservations about the novel but complimented it as "a successful novel, well made and written with a light touch".

== Film adaptation ==
The novel was loosely adapted into the 2017 film Dark River written and directed by Clio Barnard.
