= The Royle Family =

English TV sitcom (1998–2012)

- Title card
- Genre: Sitcom; Slice of life
- Created by: Caroline Aherne; Craig Cash; Henry Normal
- Written by: Caroline Aherne; Craig Cash; Henry Normal (1998); Carmel Morgan (1999); Phil Mealey (2006–2012)
- Directed by: Mark Mylod; Steve Bendelack; Caroline Aherne
- Starring: Ricky Tomlinson; Sue Johnston; Caroline Aherne; Ralf Little; Craig Cash; Liz Smith
- Opening theme: "Half the World Away" by Oasis
- Country of origin: United Kingdom
- Original language: English
- No. of series: 3
- No. of episodes: 25 (list of episodes)

Production
- Executive producer: Andy Harries
- Producers: Glenn Wilhide (1998); Kenton Allen (1999–2000); John Rushton (2006–2009)
- Production location: Granada Studios
- Cinematography: Dick Dodd
- Editor: Ian Wilson
- Running time: 26–59 mins
- Production companies: Granada Productions (1998–2008); ITV Studios (2009–2012)

Original release
- Network: BBC Two (1998); BBC One (1999–2012)
- Release: 14 September 1998 – 25 December 2012

The Royle Family is a British slice of life sitcom produced by Granada Television for the BBC, which ran for three series from 1998 to 2000, and five specials from 2006 to 2012. It centres on the lives of a television-fixated Manchester family, the Royles, comprising family patriarch Jim Royle (Ricky Tomlinson), his wife Barbara (Sue Johnston), their daughter Denise (Caroline Aherne), their son Antony (Ralf Little) and Denise's husband David (Craig Cash).

The series features simple production values and a comedic portrayal of working-class family life at the turn of the millennium, somewhat akin to a kitchen sink drama. Nearly all episodes take place in the Royles' home; largely in the telly-centric living room, with the humour derived from the conversations held therein. The later specials are presented in a more traditional sitcom format. Aherne and Cash co-wrote every episode; however various other writers are credited throughout the series' run. A further special episode was set to be produced after the series' 2012 Christmas special, but Aherne's death in 2016 effectively ended the programme.

The Royle Family received widespead acclaim and won numerous awards; furthermore, it placed 19th in the BBC poll and documentary series Britain's Best Sitcom, and 31st in the British Film Institute's list of the 100 greatest British television programmes. (Note: Drawn up in 2000 and voted on by industry professionals) In a 2001 Channel 4 poll, Jim Royle, the family's misanthropic patriarch, was ranked 11th on their list of the 100 Greatest TV Characters. The series was described by Simon Hattenstone of The Guardian as "a sitcom that compares to the best of Beckett and Pinter."

== Series ==
Most episodes appear to take place in real time and all action takes place within the Royles' council house. The passage of time as indicated by the changing programmes on the Royles' TV sometimes suggests that the action has been compressed.

Unlike most UK sitcoms of the time, the show was filmed in 16 mm film using single camera production style and was not filmed in front of an audience. The producer Glenn Wilhide is on record as saying, "It was a big fight to make sure it had no laugh track".

The one-off specials take a more traditional sitcom storyline, though many scenes still run longer than standard in line with the 'real time' nature of the original series. The 2006 special episode "The Queen of Sheba" was partly set in a hospital. Its narrative moves forward in time in a more structured manner. 2008's Christmas special, "The New Sofa", is set over two days. In it the characters spend Christmas Eve at the Royle household in the traditional manner (in front of the television), followed by Christmas Day at Dave and Denise's. Much of the 2009 Christmas special takes place in a caravan at a holiday park. It also features intermediate scenes of Dave driving the car there. Both the 2010 and 2012 Christmas specials take place at the Royles' house. There was widespread speculation as to whether the show would return after the 2012 special. In 2016, Tomlinson said that there would probably be a Christmas special that year; however, Aherne's death in July 2016 effectively ended any chances of a return for the show.

The show's theme song is "Half the World Away" by Oasis. When Aherne died, Oasis member Noel Gallagher performed a tribute to Aherne by playing it during a concert in Nashville, Tennessee.

== Characters ==
From left to right, Ralf Little as Antony Royle, Liz Smith as Norma Speakman (Nana), Sue Johnston as Barbara Royle, Ricky Tomlinson as James "Jim" Royle, Caroline Aherne as Denise Best (née Royle), Craig Cash as Dave Best

=== Main ===
- Ricky Tomlinson as James Randolph "Jim" Royle
  Misanthropic, cynical, and selfish, Jim is a slob and a miser who spends his days sitting in his armchair, watching television and doing as little as possible, and enjoys announcing his visits to the lavatory. Jim regularly mocks his family, particularly his son, Antony, and his mother-in-law Norma, when he isn't judging celebrities on television. Jim's outbursts are often accompanied by his critical catchphrase, "my arse!" Nevertheless, he sometimes displays a more understanding side, especially when his family needs emotional support. Jim has shown himself to be a big music fan; often knowledgeable about songs, he will sing song lyrics that fit in to the conversation. He is also able to play the banjo and does so on special occasions and at the request of his family.
- Sue Johnston as Barbara Royle (née Speakman)
  Barbara is Jim's long-suffering wife. She lives for her family, and her caring nature is often exploited by Jim and their daughter Denise, who let her do almost everything for them. Despite this, she is often shown to be more friendly, polite, compassionate, and level-headed than her husband. Barbara works part-time at a bakery, and for a time is the only member of the family who holds down a job. The stress of her life causes her to have a breakdown during Series 2. Johnston and Tomlinson previously played a married couple, Sheila and Bobby Grant, in Liverpool-based soap Brookside.
- Caroline Aherne as Denise Best (née Royle)
  Jim and Barbara's firstborn child and only daughter is extremely lethargic, entitled, selfish and apathetic. Before meeting Dave, Denise was engaged to a man named Stewart, but called off the engagement. She marries Dave in the first series, and they have two children, David and Norma, though she rarely looks after them, instead passing her duties on to everyone else. Jim also used to mock her for only serving her husband rudimentary dinners such as Dairylea cheese spread on toast and spaghetti hoops. Denise is known for her heavy reliance on cigarettes. She and Barbara love smoking, and often fill the ashtray. Denise is sometimes verbally abusive to her younger brother Antony, regularly leaving him to babysit her children; she and her father often force him to make tea for the family. However, there are scenes of Denise being friendly and loyal to those close to her. Sometimes she will stick up for Antony, Nana, or Cheryl if other characters ridicule them, and in an intimate scene in "The Queen of Sheba," she promises Nana that she will make her funeral fun, which she does.
- Ralf Little as Antony James Royle (1998–2010)
  Jim and Barbara's second child and only son. The family generally treats him like a dogsbody, ordering him to answer the door, make tea, and babysit his nephew and niece. He is the only family member besides Barbara who actually does any work, around the house or otherwise. Jim, Denise, and Dave constantly mock him, and he is surprised in one episode when Denise sticks up for him and Jim shows him a lot of support. Although he was originally unemployed with little prospects, the 2006 special revealed that Antony had become a successful businessman and no longer lives in Manchester. He gets engaged to girlfriend Emma after she gets pregnant and they have a son named Lewis, but they separate and he starts dating a girl named Sarah. In 2009 he is in a relationship with Saskia, who falls pregnant in early 2010 and goes into labour on Christmas Day after he proposes.
- Craig Cash as David "Dave" Best
  Denise's boyfriend and later husband, Dave is initially depicted as a "jack the lad" cheeky chappy and later portrayed as slow, lethargic, and indolent, perhaps because he works full time and is the sole carer for his and Denise's children. He is shown to be generous and good-natured, often putting up with Denise's selfish lifestyle. He is often Jim's sidekick and takes Jim's side when he argues with Barbara or Denise. Denise often takes advantage of Dave, leaving him to change nappies and comfort their children when they get upset. Denise and Dave announced that she was pregnant, and she later gave birth to baby David, and later in the series, Denise announced another pregnancy and later had a baby girl, whom she named Norma after Barbara's mother. Dave previously dated Denise's enemy, Beverley Macker, which Jim often mentions to annoy Denise. In the later series specials, Dave is portrayed as a dim-witted loafer.

=== Recurring ===
- Liz Smith as Norma Jean Speakman (Nana) (1998–2006)
  Barbara's demanding elderly mother, whom Denise and Antony called "Nana". Jim and Norma had a highly bitter feud; Jim would call her a "greedy old cow" when she would not share her Revels with him. Norma often looks for sympathy from her family, repeating the fact that she is the only living elderly woman in her block of flats, and she often hints that she wants to move in with the Royles, much to Jim's dismay. She is often easily amused by fairly unremarkable incidents or anecdotes, such as her cataract surgeon being called Michael Crawford. When her best friend Elsie dies, she and Jim argue because Norma goes from dramatic mourning to speculating about what will happen to Elsie's television set and clothes. Norma eventually moved in with the Royles when her health rapidly declined and she died during the 2006 special (Liz Smith was 85 at the time). When Nana died, Jim felt extremely remorseful because of how he feuded with her and showed respect by placing her ashes atop the television set, a place where she would always be remembered.
- Jessica Hynes as Cheryl Carroll (1998–2010)
  Denise's best friend is the daughter of the Royles' next-door neighbours, Joe and Mary Carroll. She constantly battles with her weight, going from one unsuccessful diet to the next. Jim, Antony, and Dave often ridicule her weight behind her back (and sometimes in front of her). She enjoys looking after Denise's children, and Denise takes full advantage of this. Cheryl is portrayed as unlucky in love, though she has a relationship with Twiggy between the 2006 and 2008 episodes, before leaving him for a man with a burger van. On Christmas Day 2010, Cheryl revealed she had been dating a homeless person called "Spamhead" who stole her father's savings before leaving her. Until 2006, she is credited as Jessica Stevenson.
- Doreen Keogh as Mary Carroll (1998–2006)
  Mary is Barbara's best friend and lives next door to the Royles with her husband Joe and daughter Cheryl. She is Irish and is portrayed as kindly, upbeat and very talkative, in direct contrast to her husband. Mary seems to grow somewhat odd as time goes on, telling Twiggy's girlfriend at baby David's christening that she is a teacher, before being reminded by Barbara that she is actually a dinner lady. She last appears in the 2006 special and by Christmas 2009 her health has deteriorated and she suffers from severe incontinence. By the 2010 Christmas special, Mary had died.
- Peter Martin as Joe Carroll (1998–2012)
  Mary's husband and Cheryl's father is very quiet and monosyllabic, which is a regular source of mockery from Jim and Antony, but after a few drinks he generally becomes more sociable; on a few occasions, he has proven to be a talented singer. He also appears to be a lot more confident and happy in Mary's absence. After Mary's death, he carries her ashes around with him, talks of her constantly, and decides to move house before Cheryl convinces him to remain.
- Geoffrey Hughes as Twiggy (1998–2008)
  Twiggy is a longtime family friend of the Royles, and regularly visits, usually with rip-off materials or stolen goods to sell. He has been in prison, fathered at least two sons, and briefly dated Cheryl. Twiggy sees prison as a holiday and describes it as "recharging the old batteries". Twiggy's criminal tendencies become more serious as the series progresses; from selling knock-off, in "The New Sofa", he appears at Denise's house with several half-empty spirits bottles (with optics still attached), presumably stolen from the local pub; he nonchalantly claims he could have "gotten more if the dog had not started barking". His real name is never revealed; his nickname is ironic, as he is very overweight. Twiggy's last appearance was in the 2008 Christmas special as Hughes retired in 2010 and died in 2012.
- Andrew Whyment as Darren Sinclair-Jones (1999–2000)
  Darren is friends with Antony in Series 2 and 3. Darren is portrayed to be dull, uneducated, and apathetic. Like Twiggy, Darren is light-fingered and has been sacked for stealing from every job he has ever had. His brothers are all in prison, his father is an alcoholic who never leaves the pub, and his mother (when not in hospital with her failing health) lives with Darren in a house where the bailiffs have taken all the furniture. Despite his criminal tendencies, Darren is generally kind-hearted, to the point that, when Antony and Emma ask him to be godfather to their unborn child, he cries tears of joy.
- Sheridan Smith as Emma Kavanagh (1999–2000)
  Emma is Antony's first girlfriend. She first appears in the Series 2 finale, after being mentioned several times in earlier episodes. Emma comes from a wealthy family, but gets on well with the Royles. In the Series 3 finale, Antony announces his engagement to Emma, which leads Jim and Barbara to correctly assume that Emma is pregnant. In the 2000 Christmas special, Emma's arrogant parents, Roger and Valerie, meet Jim and Barbara for the first time. Emma does not appear in the 2006 special, by which time she has separated from Antony. Antony and Emma continue to share custody of their son Lewis, who appears in the 2006 special.
- Joanne Froggatt as Saskia (2010)
  Saskia, Antony's girlfriend, is mentioned in the 2009 Christmas special and appears on Christmas Day 2010. She is an A&E nurse and is heavily pregnant when she appears. The Royles have a high level of interest in Saskia and have no respect for her privacy; for example, they read her diary and look through her clothes. In 2009, she did not wish to go to the Royles' because of Jim's behaviour on a previous visit. Antony proposed to Saskia on Christmas Day 2010, on which she went into labour a month early.

== Episodes ==
Series
Series	Episodes	Originally released	
Series	Episodes	First released	Last released
1	6	14 September 1998	19 October 1998
2	6	24 September 1999	28 October 1999
2	1	25 December 1999	
3	6	16 October 2000	27 November 2000
3	1	25 December 2000	
Specials	5	29 October 2006	25 December 2012

=== 1998–2000: Original run ===
The first series aired on BBC Two in 1998, quickly gaining a following such that it was moved to BBC One for the second series in 1999, when it became even more popular. A Christmas special aired in 1999, followed by a third series and another Christmas special in 2000. Whilst each of the episodes can be viewed independently of each other, the first three series each have their own story arc running through them to give a greater sense of continuity, again unique for a British sitcom of this era. In series one the focus is on the buildup to Dave and Denise's wedding day, in the second series it partly focuses on Denise's pregnancy culminating in her giving birth on Christmas Day in the Christmas special. The third series builds up to Baby David's Christening as well as the relationship between Antony and Emma. Certain episodes also appear to parallel each other if the first three series are watched in order- for example the fifth episode of the first series focuses on a row between Dave and Denise whilst the fifth episode of the second series focuses on a row between Jim and Barbara.

In 2000, Aherne announced that she would not write or star in any more episodes. Ricky Tomlinson also pulled out to ensure the show's end.

=== 2006–2012: Specials ===
On 7 April 2006, the BBC announced that Aherne and Cash were to write a script for a one-off special, which was broadcast on 29 October 2006. The episode received widespread critical acclaim, having been watched by over 8,000,000 viewers.

"The Queen of Sheba" takes place six years after the events of the last series and features Nana's declining health and death. It won the Best Sitcom award at the 2007 BAFTAs, and won the Royal Television Society Award for Best Situation Comedy & Comedy Drama. Liz Smith's performance won her the Best TV Comedy Actress award at the National Television Awards and was BAFTA-nominated.

The 2008 Christmas special, entitled "The New Sofa", was the first that took place mainly outside of the Royles' house. It began at the Royles', but moved to the Bests' house early on. Ralf Little did not appear in this episode, but his character is referenced. The hour-long special aired on Christmas Day 2008, and attracted 10,600,000 viewers, making it the fifth most watched programme on Christmas Day and the fifth most watched for the entire week ending 28 December 2008.

The Royle Family returned as part of Comic Relief, on 13 March 2009. It also marked the return of Ralf Little as Antony, who joined Dave, Denise, Jim and Barbara in the one-off mini episode.

Another Christmas special, "The Golden Egg Cup", was broadcast on 25 December 2009, at 9:00 pm on BBC One and also in HD on the BBC HD channel. The episode was the most watched show on TV on Christmas Day and for the entire week ending 26 December 2009, attracting an audience of 11,740,000 viewers and the highest-rated episode of The Royle Family.

In November 2010 Gold broadcast a two-hour episode called "Behind The Sofa", with interviews from the cast and crew celebrating the show's return in 2006. Another show entitled Royle Family Portraits was aired on Gold on Wednesday 17 November.

Another Christmas special entitled "Joe's Crackers" was aired on 25 December 2010, on BBC One and BBC HD. The ratings for the BBC One transmission were 11,290,000 viewers, making it the fourth-most watched programme of Christmas Day and the sixth most watched for the entire week ending 26 December 2010.

Another Christmas special was planned for 2011, but a script was not completed in time for filming.

A final Christmas special for 2012, entitled "Barbara's Old Ring", aired on 25 December 2012. The broadcast was the third most popular programme on Christmas Day, achieving a rating of 9,900,000 viewers and was the sixth most watched programme for the week ending 30 December, across all UK TV channels.

A short charity special was made for Comic Relief in 2013.

A further special episode was set to be written, but Aherne was ill with lung cancer and died on 2 July 2016, effectively ending the programme. Tomlinson stated that he would not do further episodes without Aherne.

== Reception ==
=== Ratings ===
Series	Timeslot	Episodes	First aired		Last aired		Rank	Avg. viewers (millions)
Series	Timeslot	Episodes	Date	Viewers (millions)	Date	Viewers (millions)	Rank	Avg. viewers (millions)
1	Monday 10:00 pm	6	14 September 1998	3.83	19 October 1998	4.86	5	4.09
2	Thursday 10:00 pm (1–6) Saturday 10:30 pm (7)	7	23 September 1999	7.64	25 December 1999	10.44	19	7.68
3	Monday 9:30 pm (1–5) 9:00 pm (6), 10:10 pm (7)	7	16 October 2000	9.93	25 December 2000	9.78	7	9.33

Source: BARB

=== Awards and nominations ===
Year	Award Show	Category	Result	Recipient(s)	Ref(s)
1998	British Comedy Awards	Best New TV Comedy	Won	The Royle Family	
1999	BAFTA TV Awards	Best Comedy Performance	Nominated	Caroline Aherne	
1999	BAFTA TV Awards	Best Comedy (Programme or Series)	Nominated	Glenn Wilhide; Mark Mylod; Caroline Aherne; Craig Cash; Henry Normal	
1999	British Comedy Awards	Best TV Comedy Actor	Won	Ricky Tomlinson	
1999	British Comedy Awards	Best TV Comedy Actress	Won	Caroline Aherne	
1999	British Comedy Awards	Best Female Comedy Newcomer	Won	Jessica Hynes	
1999	British Comedy Awards	Best TV Sitcom	Won	The Royle Family	
1999	British Comedy Awards	Best Male Comedy Newcomer	Nominated	Craig Cash	
1999	Broadcasting Press Guild Awards	Writer's Award	Won	Caroline Aherne; Craig Cash; Henry Normal	
1999	RTS Awards	Best Situation Comedy/ Comedy Drama	Nominated	Granada Television	
1999	RTS Craft & Design Awards	Best Tape & Film Editing - Entertainment & Situation Comedy	Won	Tony Cranstoun	
1999	RTS Craft & Design Awards	Best Art Director	Won	Rachel Pierce	
2000	BAFTA TV Awards	Best Comedy Performance	Won	Caroline Aherne	
2000	BAFTA TV Awards	Best Comedy Performance	Nominated	Sue Johnston	
2000	BAFTA TV Awards	Best Comedy Performance	Nominated	Ricky Tomlinson	
2000	BAFTA TV Awards	Best Situation Comedy	Won	Kenton Allen; Caroline Aherne; Craig Cash	
2000	BAFTA TV Craft Awards	Best Editing	Won	Tony Cranstoun	
2000	British Comedy Awards	Best TV Comedy Actress	Won	Sue Johnston	
2000	British Comedy Awards	Best TV Comedy Actor	Nominated	Ricky Tomlinson	
2000	British Comedy Awards	Best TV Comedy	Nominated	The Royle Family	
2000	National Television Awards	Most Popular Comedy Programme	Won	The Royle Family	
2000	RTS Awards	Best Writer	Won	Caroline Aherne; Craig Cash	
2000	RTS Awards	Best Situation Comedy/ Comedy Drama	Nominated	Granada Television	
2000	TV Quick Awards	Best Comedy Show	Won	The Royle Family	
2001	BAFTA TV Awards	Best Comedy Performance	Nominated	Caroline Aherne	
2001	BAFTA TV Awards	Best Situation Comedy	Nominated	The Royle Family	
2001	BAFTA TV Craft Awards	Best New Director – Fiction	Nominated	Caroline Aherne	
2001	National Television Awards	Most Popular Comedy Programme	Won	The Royle Family	
2001	National Television Awards	Most Popular Comedy Performer	Won	Ricky Tomlinson	
2001	RTS Awards	Best Situation Comedy/ Comedy Drama	Won	Granada Television	
2001	RTS Craft & Design Awards	Art Director	Won	Rachel Pierce	
2001	TRIC Awards	TV Comedy Programme	Won	The Royle Family	
2001	TV Quick Awards	Best Comedy Show	Won	The Royle Family	
2007	BAFTA TV Awards	Best Situation Comedy	Won	Caroline Aherne; Craig Cash; John Rushton; Phil Mealey	
2007	BAFTA TV Awards	Best Comedy Performance	Nominated	Liz Smith	
2007	BAFTA TV Awards	Pioneer Audience Award	Nominated	The Royle Family: The Queen of Sheba	
2007	British Comedy Awards	Best TV Comedy Actress	Won	Liz Smith	
2007	RTS Awards	Best Situation Comedy/ Comedy Drama	Won	Granada Television	

== Home media ==
=== VHS releases ===
- The Royle Family: The Complete 1st Series – 8 November 1999.
- The Royle Family: The Complete 2nd Series – 6 November 2000.
- The Essential Royle Family (Marks & Spencer exclusive) – includes Series 1, episode 2, Series 2, episodes 4, 5 & 7 (released 2000).
- The Royle Family: The Complete 3rd Series – 19 November 2001.
- The Royle Family: The Complete 1st Series / The Complete 2nd Series / The Complete Third Series box set – 19 November 2001.
- The Very Best of the Royle Family – 25 November 2002. (see DVD section for episodes).

=== DVD releases ===
DVD title	Release date			Features
DVD title	Region 1	Region 2	Region 4	Features
The Complete 1st Series	16 January 2007	6 November 2000	6 November 2006	6 episodes; 1 disc; BBFC rating: 12; ACB rating: PG
The Complete 1st Series	No release	15 May 2006	5 September 2012	6 episodes; 1 disc; BBFC rating: 12; ACB rating: PG
The Complete 2nd Series	15 January 2008	6 November 2000	3 March 2007	6 episodes + 1999 Christmas special; 1 disc; BBFC rating: 12; ACB rating: PG
The Complete 2nd Series	No release	15 May 2006	5 September 2012	6 episodes + 1999 Christmas special; 1 disc; BBFC rating: 12; ACB rating: PG
The Complete 3rd Series	No release	19 November 2001	2 June 2007	6 episodes + 2000 Christmas special; 1 disc; BBFC rating: 12; ACB rating: PG
The Complete 3rd Series	No release	15 May 2006	6 March 2013	6 episodes + 2000 Christmas special; 1 disc; BBFC rating: 12; ACB rating: PG
Specials & compilations
The Very Best Of…	No release	25 November 2002	No release	6 episodes (S1.6, S2.6, S2.7, S3.3, S3.6, S3.7); 1 disc
The Queen of Sheba	No release	30 October 2006	21 November 2012 (as one set)	2006 special; 1 disc; 2 discs (Region 4 – w/ The New Sofa); BBFC rating: 15; ACB: M
The New Sofa	No release	26 January 2009	21 November 2012 (as one set)	2008 Christmas special; 1 disc; 2 discs (Region 4 – w/ The Queen of Sheba); BBFC rating: 12; ACB: M
Christmas with…	No release	16 August 2010	No release	1999, 2000 & 2008 specials; 1 disc
The Golden Egg Cup	No release	1 February 2010	21 November 2012 (as one set)	2009 Christmas special; 1 disc; 2 discs (Region 4 – w/ Joe's Crackers); BBFC rating: 12; ACB: PG
Joe's Crackers	No release	31 January 2011	21 November 2012 (as one set)	2010 Christmas special; 1 disc; 2 discs (Region 4 – w/ The Golden Eggcup); BBFC rating: 12; ACB: PG
Barbara's Old Ring	No release	21 January 2013	No release	2012 Christmas special; 1 disc; BBFC rating: 12
Collections
The Complete Series	No release	15 May 2006	29 March 2008	18 episodes + 1999 & 2000 Christmas specials; 3 discs
Album	No release	1 September 2008	No release	18 episodes + 1999, 2000 & 2006 Christmas specials; 4 discs
Album – Bumper Edition	No release	17 August 2009	No release	18 episodes + 1999, 2000, 2006 & 2008 Christmas specials; 5 discs
The Collection	No release	16 August 2010	No release	18 episodes + 1999, 2000, 2006, 2008 & 2009 Christmas specials; 7 discs
The Complete Collection	No release	7 October 2013	No release	18 episodes + 1999, 2000, 2006, 2008, 2009, 2010 & 2012 Christmas specials; 9 discs; Special features: "We Love The Royle Family" documentary; Children in Need Special; Deleted Scenes; Outtakes; Cast Interviews

=== Streaming ===
In the United Kingdom, the complete series was made available via several streaming services including BBC iPlayer and subscription services, BritBox and Now. In Australia, the series is currently available to stream via Foxtel Now.

=== Books ===
- The Royle Family: The Scripts – Series 1, by Caroline Aherne, Craig Cash, and Henry Normal. London: Granada Media/Andre Deutsch, 15 November 1999.
- The Royle Family: The Scripts – Series 2, by Caroline Aherne, Craig Cash, and Carmel Morgan. London: Granada Media, 18 September 2000.
- The Royle Family: My Arse, by Caroline Aherne. Welbeck Publishing Group, 1 October 2001.
- The Royle Family: The Complete Scripts, covers all scripts from Series 1, 2, and 3. Granada Media, 5 August 2002.

=== Audiobooks ===
- The Royle Family (BBC Radio Collection), features four episodes from the first series. BBC Audiobooks Ltd., 6 November 2000.
- The Royle Family 2 (BBC Radio Collection), features four episodes from the second series. BBC Audiobooks Ltd., 5 November 2001.
- The Royle Family 3 (BBC Radio Collection), features four episodes from the third series. BBC Audiobooks Ltd., 25 November 2002.
- The Royle Family Collection (BBC Radio Collection), features twelve episodes from the first, second and third series. BBC Audiobooks Ltd., 25 November 2002.

== Connections to other works ==
The subsequent sitcom Early Doors was also written by Craig Cash and Phil Mealey and has a similar production style and setting to The Royle Family. Cash also appears in Early Doors.

A frequent pastime for the family is watching the BBC series Antiques Roadshow and betting on the outcome of valuations.

In several episodes, the family are seen watching Coronation Street, a long-running Northern English-based soap opera, in which Sue Johnston, Doreen Keogh, Geoffrey Hughes and Andrew Whyment have all played regular characters. Guest actors Sally Lindsay (Michelle, Twiggy's girlfriend), Sharon Duce (Valerie, Emma's Mother), Steve Huison (Derek, Cheryl's Boyfriend) Helen Fraser (Jocelyn Best, Dave's Mother) and Joanne Froggatt (Saskia, Antony's fiancée) have also appeared in the programme.

In the 1999 Christmas special, Nana (Liz Smith) asks when Dibley is on, meaning The Vicar Of Dibley (1994–2007), 'with that big funny girl who dresses up as a vicar', meaning Dawn French. Smith herself had starred in The Vicar Of Dibley in which she had played Letitia Cropley until her character was killed off in 1996.

Sue Johnston and Joanne Froggatt would work together once again on the UK period drama, Downton Abbey, both as lady's maids, Johnston playing Gladys Denker and Froggatt playing Anna Bates.

Caroline Aherne and Craig Cash have both narrated and Cash continues to narrate the Channel 4 series Gogglebox, which, like The Royle Family, features people watching TV.

In the series 2 finale, Anthony and Darren mimic the "Suits you, Sir!" recurring sketch from The Fast Show sparking a reaction from Norma while Denise laughs. Aherne regularly appeared in The Fast Show.

Ralf Little and Sheridan Smith were also cast as a couple in the BBC Three sitcom Two Pints of Lager and a Packet of Crisps.

Craig Cash and Sue Johnston co-starred in the 2016 comedy series Rovers.

== American version ==
In 2001, it was announced that a proposed remake was in the works and to be retitled The Kennedys. The American version, produced for CBS, featured Randy Quaid as Jim Kennedy, Pamela Reed as Pamela (Barbara), Sarah Ann Morris as Denise, John Francis Daley as Anthony, and Page Kennedy as Roger (Dave). It was set in Boston and followed the lives of a blue-collar, working-class family. The series was to adapt the original plot lines of the first series of The Royle Family. A pilot was produced in April 2001, which did not prove successful and therefore CBS opted not to pick the show up.

== See also ==
- British sitcom
