= Dark River (2017 film) =

2017 film by Clio Barnard

- British release poster
- Directed by: Clio Barnard
- Written by: Clio Barnard
- Produced by: Tracy O'Riordan
- Starring: Ruth Wilson; Mark Stanley; Sean Bean
- Cinematography: Adriano Goldman
- Edited by: Luka Dunkley; Nick Fenton
- Music by: Harry Escott
- Production companies: Film4; Left Bank Pictures; Moonspun Films
- Distributed by: Arrow Films
- Release dates: 7 September 2017 (TIFF); 23 February 2018 (UK)
- Running time: 89 minutes
- Country: United Kingdom
- Language: English
- Box office: $159,890

Dark River is a 2017 British drama film written and directed by Clio Barnard, and starring Ruth Wilson, Mark Stanley, and Sean Bean. The film is loosely based on Rose Tremain's novel Trespass. Originally Barnard intended the film to be a straightforward adaptation of the novel, which was set in southern France and involved two sets of elderly siblings involved in a property dispute. Encouraged by the financiers to make the story her own, Barnard changed the location of the film to Yorkshire, and instead focused on a woman who returns to the home she fled 15 years earlier in order to claim the tenancy of her father's farm, who then becomes involved in a dispute with her brother. It screened in the Platform section at the 2017 Toronto International Film Festival and was released in the United Kingdom on 23 February 2018.

== Plot ==
Alice Bell (Ruth Wilson) works as a sheep shearer on a farm where she gets along well with her fellow coworkers. When her father dies she quits her job as her father had told her that she would inherit his tenancy when he died. As she returns to the farm Alice begins to have vivid flashbacks involving her father, including his entering her bedroom, and his holding her in bed.

When Alice initially returns to the farm her brother, Joe, is absent. She settles herself there, but refuses to sleep in the main house as it triggers flashbacks. When her brother returns he is initially angry at her for showing up after their father is dead and after an absence of 15 years. However, he gradually warms to her, only to anger again when he discovers that Alice has applied to take over the tenancy of the farm.

Alice learns from the land agent that she has a good chance of having her tenancy accepted if she can repair the neglect incurred by her father and brother. Her efforts to repair the land and kill the rats are met with resistance by Joe, who feels that she will upset the delicate ecosystem of the farm (for example, the rats share the barn with fledglings who he thinks would come to harm). Begrudgingly they begin to work together, though Joe continues to chafe at Alice's way of doing things. Alice starts to train the dog Joe bought but didn't train.

Joe is approached by one of the land owners of the farm who secretly reveals that the farms are no longer profitable and that tenants who agree to be bought out will receive a cash lump sum of £100,000. Knowing that Alice would refuse a buyout, the man suggests to Joe that if he were awarded the tenancy he could evict Alice and keep the money. Joe decides to go along with the scheme and tells Alice that if he is awarded the tenancy he will evict her. Alice is shocked as she planned to keep Joe on if she was awarded the tenancy.

Feeling guilty, Joe attacks Alice's car in a drunken rage, trying to set it on fire. Alice has him arrested. While Joe is away she fumigates the house and has a flashback remembering her father reacting in a jealous rage after Joe told him that Alice had a boyfriend.

Joe is put on probation and returns. Nevertheless, he is awarded the tenancy. Alice discovers Joe preparing to sell all the sheep and tries to get him to stop. In the middle of their dispute Joe shoves Alice and she hits her head. Joe brings her back to her childhood room to recover. When Alice wakes up the two discuss her sexual abuse at the hands of their father for the first time. Joe asks her why she would sometimes go to their father's room and she reveals that waiting for him to rape her was the worst part. She then asks him why he never tried to stop their father to which he has no answer. Their conversation coincides with Alice's eviction. Joe, ashamed, confesses to being bought out. In the middle of their argument a loose dog attacks and kills one of their sheep. Alice goes after the dog with a gun, and has a PTSD induced flashback which results in her accidentally shooting and killing their neighbour. While Alice is wracked with guilt and has a breakdown beside the body, Joe decides to turn himself in, claiming that he committed the murder.

Sometime later Alice visits Joe in prison where she brings him a piece of a plant he had mentioned to her earlier. They sit in silence until Alice asks Joe if she can come again and he tells her to do so.

== Cast ==
- Ruth Wilson as Alice
- Mark Stanley as Joe Bell
- Sean Bean as Richard Bell
- Joe Dempsie as David
- Esmé Creed-Miles as Young Alice
- Aiden McCullough as Young Joe
- Dean Andrews as Matty
- Shane Attwooll as Tower
- Steve Garti as Jim
- Una McNulty as Susan Bell
- Jonah Russell as Pete
- Paul Roberson as Declan

== Reception ==
On review aggregator website Rotten Tomatoes, the film holds an approval rating of 79% based on 52 reviews, and an average rating of 6.4/10. The website's critical consensus reads, "Dark River is just as bleak as its title would suggest, but solidly conceived characters and a standout performance from Ruth Wilson make it worth diving in." On Metacritic, which uses a weighted average, the film has a weighted average score of 69 out of 100, based on 22 critics, indicating "generally favorable reviews".
