= The Harrodian School =

Coordinates: 51.48162°N 0.24632°W

Location
- Lonsdale Road, Barnes; London SW13 9QN; England

Information
- Type: Independent day school
- Established: September 1993; 33 years ago
- Founder: Alford Houstoun-Boswall
- Department for Education URN: 102950 Tables
- Chairman/Proprietor: Sir Alford Houstoun-Boswall
- Principal: James Hooke
- Gender: Coeducational
- Age: 4 to 18
- Enrolment: 925 (approx.)
- Houses: Bridge, Ferry, Lonsdale and Thames
- Alumni: Old Harrodians
- Website: http://www.harrodian.com/

The Harrodian School is a private day school in Barnes, South-west London. Formerly the site of Harrods Sports Club, the original premises had been extended and converted for educational purposes. The school opened in September 1993 with 65 pupils; by 2011, the roll had grown to 925.

== History ==
The Harrodian school was founded by Eliana and Sir Alford Houstoun-Boswall with 65 pupils and 12 staff. Until 1988, the site had been a clubhouse and sports ground for employees of Harrods department store.

=== Early History ===
In 1670, Mill Farm was established on 138 acres of meadows, alongside the River Thames, and was built on the site now occupied by the main school. In 1880, Mill Lodge, became the home of entrepreneur and Justice of the Peace, Samuel Keene. In 1904, a 25-acre sports club, with palatial clubhouse, was built ‘for the mental and physical betterment of Harrods' employees’, better known as the Harrodian Club. In 1988, the premises went up for sale and in 1992, the store's owner Mohamed Al-Fayed sold the grounds to Sir Alford Houstoun Boswall, despite being unhappy that the newly-founded school took the name, and in fact, challenged this in court.

=== 1990s - 2000s ===
In 1996, Peter Thomson, former head of Emanuel School became Headmaster. Eliana Houstoun-Boswall was the founding headmistress, but in the same year was left by her husband after her affair with a teacher became public. The publicity again prompted Harrods to object to the school's perceived connection to them. She has gone on to found another private school, Hampton Court House. The following year, the first 15 common entrance pupils achieved a 100 per cent pass rate. In 1999, the first Harrodians sat GCSE exams, Peter Thomson became Principal and James Hooke, Deputy Head and Director of Studies, was promoted to Headmaster. In 2001, the newly built Senior School building opened and the first Harrodian Art Exhibition featuring work by pupils and local artists took hold. In 2002, The Harrodian opened its Sixth Form and pupil numbers increased to 700. In addition, the school hosted its first overseas Sports tour (to South Africa). In 2003, the new music department building opened while the first music department international tour occurred (to Prague). In 2004, the first wave of Harrodians sat their ‘A’ Levels. In 2008, Harrodian won its first Cambridge University places.

In 2011, long-serving principal Peter Thomson died.

== Fees and charges ==
As of the 2025-2026 academic year, the school charges tuition fees of (termly): £6,695 (4 to 7+ years of age); £7,684 (8 to 12+ years); £8,884 (13+ to 15+ years) and £10,290 (sixth form). In addition to tuition fees, charges are made for lunch; insurance, and registration; these additional charges amount to approximately £1,500/year.

== Notable alumni ==
- Paul Chowdhry, comedian
- Jemma Donovan, actress
- Fabien Frankel, actor
- Isabel Getty, singer and socialite
- Jack and Finn Harries, YouTubers
- Will Heard, singer, songwriter and musician
- Jemima Kirke, actress
- Abigail Lawrie, actress
- George MacKay, actor
- Robert Pattinson, actor
- Will Poulter, actor
- Tom Sturridge, actor
- Rohan Vinod Mehra, actor
