= Left Bank Pictures =

UK film and TV production company founded 2007

Left Bank Pictures Ltd.
- Formerly: Tonto Film And Television Ltd (Nov–Dec 2006); Geronimo Film and TV Limited (2006–2007)
- Type: Subsidiary
- Industry: Television; Film
- Founded: July 2007; 19 years ago
- Founder: Andy Harries; Francis Hopkinson; Marigo Kehoe
- Headquarters: London, England
- Key people: Andy Harries (chairman); Charlotte Moore (CEO); Grace Wilson (COO)
- Products: Television programs; Feature films
- Parent: Sony Pictures Television International Production (2012–present)
- Website: leftbankpictures.co.uk

Left Bank Pictures Ltd. (stylised as LEFT BANK Pictures) is a British film and television production company owned by Sony Pictures Television through its International Production division. It was formed in 2007 and was the first British media company to receive investment from BBC Worldwide, the commercial arm of the BBC.

Left Bank Pictures' productions include the television series Wallander, Strike Back, DCI Banks and Outlander. Their production The Crown is the first British-American television series produced exclusively for Netflix. The series' first season was released on 4 November 2016.

== History ==
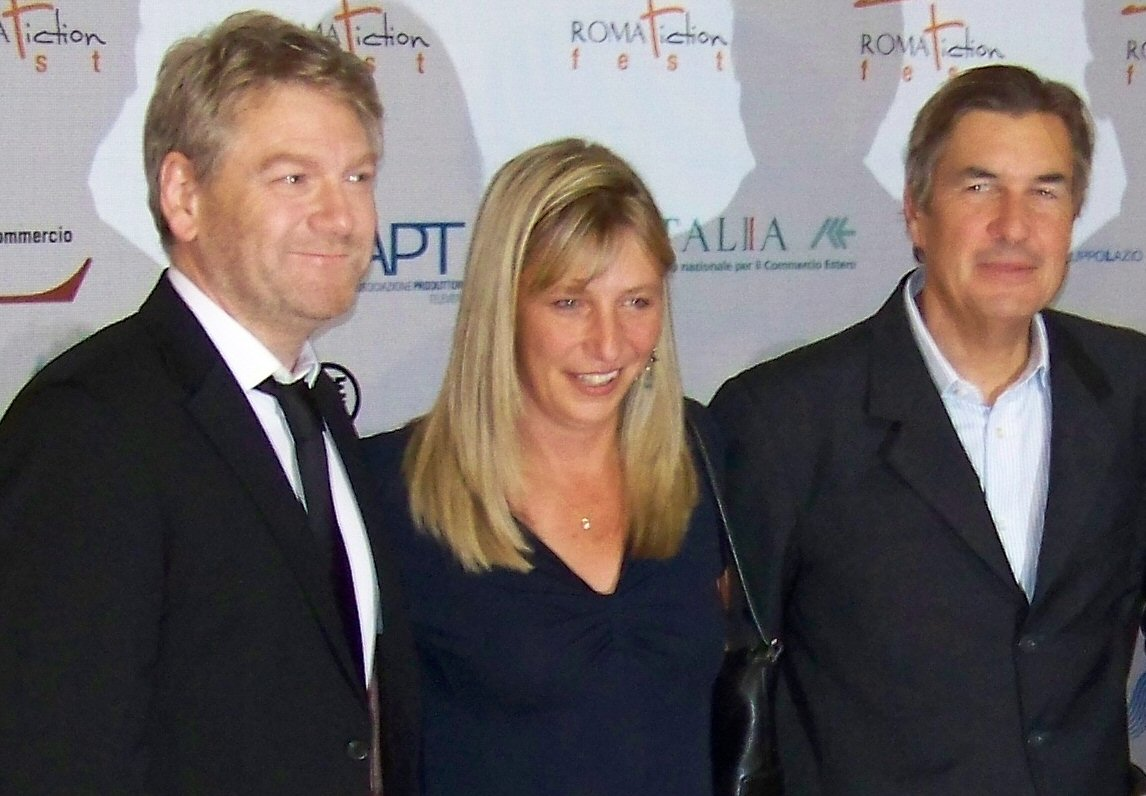
Left Bank founders Marigo Kehoe (centre) and Andy Harries (right) with Wallander star Kenneth Branagh (left) in July 2009

Left Bank Pictures was founded in 2007 by Andy Harries, formerly controller of drama, comedy and film at Granada Productions, Francis Hopkinson and Marigo Kehoe. The company was the first British media company to receive equity investment from BBC Worldwide, the commercial venture of the BBC. BBC Worldwide took a 25% stake, worth £1 million, in Left Bank in exchange for first-look distribution rights on all television productions, in a five-year deal.

In December 2008, Left Bank Pictures was one of many independent production companies to receive the production vision award from the UK Film Council. The award part-funded Left Bank's film development slate. In February 2009, Suzanne Mackie, formerly head of development at Harbour Pictures, joined the company as head of film.

Hopkinson announced his departure in 2011 to take up a new position with ITV Studios. Michael Casey joined the company, taking on the development slate, and Simon Lupton joined the comedy department. The company was put up for sale for £40 million on 6 April 2012. On 5 July 2012, Sony Pictures Television made a deal to acquire Left Bank for £40 million. The sale was completed on 23 August 2012, with SPT becoming the majority shareholder, and BBC Worldwide, Harries and Kehoe reducing their stake in the company. BBC Worldwide reduced its stake from 25% to 12.2%.

== Productions ==
Left Bank Pictures' first television commission was Wallander, a television adaptation of Henning Mankell's Kurt Wallander novels. The first series was filmed on location in Skåne, Sweden in the summer of 2008, and broadcast in November and December 2008. The series won the British Academy Television Award for Best Drama Series. The BBC announced the commissioning of a second series in May 2009. Filming ran over the summer again and the series was broadcast in January 2010. The final series as broadcast in 2016.

In March 2008, it was announced that Left Bank would be producing Strike Back, a six-part series for Sky One based on Chris Ryan's novel. The production, starring Richard Armitage and Andrew Lincoln, was filmed on location in South Africa in 2009 for broadcast on Sky1 and Sky1 HD in 2010. Also in 2008, Left Bank produced its first feature film; The Damned United was directed by Tom Hooper from a script adapted by Peter Morgan from David Peace's novel The Damned Utd.

2008 also saw Left Bank's first commission for Channel 4; Kids School of Comedy, a pilot sketch show, was produced for the Comedy Lab strand, and was based on a stage show in which Andy Harries' son performed. A six-part School of Comedy series was commissioned by E4 and was broadcast in 2009. A second series has since been commissioned. At the end of 2008, Left Bank received its first commission from ITV, to produce Frank Deasy's four-part serial drama Father & Son. The drama was co-financed by ITV, the Irish broadcaster RTÉ and the Irish Film Board. The production was based in Dublin, where most of the programme was filmed, even though it was set in Manchester, England. RTÉ broadcast the drama in 2009, and it went on to win the Irish Film and Television Award for Best Single Drama/Drama Serial category. It was broadcast on ITV1 in June 2010.

In 2009, Left Bank produced the six-part romantic comedy series Married Single Other for ITV. The series stars Ralf Little, Shaun Dooley, Lucy Davis, Miranda Raison, Amanda Abbington and Dean Lennox Kelly, and was filmed on location in Leeds. It was broadcast on ITV1 in February and March 2010. In 2010, Left Bank produced an adaptation of Peter Robinson's Aftermath for ITV, starring Stephen Tompkinson as DCI Banks, and Zen, an adaptation of three of Michael Dibdin's Aurelio Zen novels, which was filmed on location in Italy for BBC Scotland. In 2011, Sky1 broadcast the first series of Left Bank's Mad Dogs, starring John Simm, Philip Glenister, Marc Warren and Max Beesley. In 2012 Optimum Releasing distributed the feature film All in Good Time.

=== Filmography ===
==== Television ====
- Wallander (2008−2016)
- School of Comedy (2008 pilot, 2009−2010)
- Father & Son (2009)
- Married Single Other (2010)
- Strike Back (2010−2020) (co-produced by Cinemax in 2011)
- DCI Banks (2010−2016)
- Zen (2011)
- Mad Dogs (2011−2013)
- Strike Back: Project Dawn (2011)
- Cardinal Burns (2012)
- Loving Miss Hatto — TV film
- The Ice Cream Girls (2013)
- Tommy Cooper: Not Like That, Like This (2014)
- Outlander (2014–2026)
- The Crown (2016–2023)
- Madiba (2017)
- The Replacement (2017)
- The Halcyon (2017)
- Philip K. Dick's Electric Dreams (2017)
- Pls Like (2017–2021)
- Origin (2018)
- Quiz (2020)
- White Lines (2020)
- Behind Her Eyes (2021)
- Without Sin (2022)
- The Fear Index (2022)
- Three Pines (2022)
- Who Is Erin Carter? (2023)
- Everything Now (2023)
- Insomnia (2024)
- This City Is Ours (2025–present)
- Dept. Q (2025–present)
- Outlander: Blood of My Blood (2025–present)
- The Lady (2026)
- Dear England (2026)
- The Girl with the Dragon Tattoo (2027)

==== Film ====
- The Damned United (2009) (Distributed by Columbia Pictures)
- The Lady (2011) (Distributed by EuropaCorp (France), Entertainment Film Distributors (UK), Cohen Media Group (US), and Golden Scene Company Limited (Hong Kong))
- All in Good Time (2012)
- Dark River (2017)
- Misbehaviour (2020)

== Awards ==
- Broadcast Award for Best Independent Production Company (2011) — Won
