= List of The Royle Family episodes =

The Royle Family is a BAFTA award-winning television sitcom produced by Granada Television for the BBC. It stars Ricky Tomlinson, Sue Johnston, Caroline Aherne, Ralf Little and Craig Cash. 25 episodes of The Royle Family were made and broadcast.

== Series overview ==
Series
Series	Episodes	Originally released	
Series	Episodes	First released	Last released
1	6	14 September 1998	19 October 1998
2	6	24 September 1999	28 October 1999
2	1	25 December 1999	
3	6	16 October 2000	27 November 2000
3	1	25 December 2000	
Specials	5	29 October 2006	25 December 2012

== Episodes ==
=== Series 1 (1998) ===
No. overall	No. in series	Title	Directed by	Written by	Original release date	Viewers (millions)
1	1	"Episode 1"	Mark Mylod	Caroline Aherne, Craig Cash & Henry Normal	14 September 1998	3.83
When the latest phone bill arrives, Jim is annoyed to discover that someone has been calling Aberdeen. Cheryl brings over a catalogue and she and Denise decide to buy leather jackets. Meanwhile, Barbara is nervous about starting her new job at the bakers.
2	2	"Episode 2"	Mark Mylod	Caroline Aherne, Craig Cash & Henry Normal	21 September 1998	3.69
During the family's after-dinner television time, they are forced to listen to Jim moan about the cost of Denise's upcoming wedding.
3	3	"Episode 3"	Mark Mylod	Caroline Aherne, Craig Cash & Henry Normal	28 September 1998	3.86
Nana spends Sunday afternoon with the Royles and Jim helps Antony do the dishes to avoid listening to her; Mary and Cheryl drop in to help Denise try on her wedding dress; Dave recovers from a hangover.
4	4	"Episode 4"	Mark Mylod	Caroline Aherne, Craig Cash & Henry Normal	5 October 1998	4.20
The Royles celebrate Jim's birthday in their own style: cake, pomagne, and photos. Meanwhile, Denise has a hangover although she claims it is a stress headache, and Antony has a black eye from fighting with the Beswick brothers.
5	5	"Episode 5"	Mark Mylod	Caroline Aherne, Craig Cash & Henry Normal	12 October 1998	4.07
Denise and Dave come home from one of Dave's DJ gigs arguing about Beverly Macca. Barbara consoles a drunk Denise, who tells her Dave was flirting with Beverly; while in the kitchen Dave tells Jim and Antony that it was nothing. She forgives Dave after a talk with her parents, and the family has a sing-a-long with Jim's banjo.
6	6	"Episode 6"	Mark Mylod	Caroline Aherne, Craig Cash & Henry Normal	19 October 1998	4.86
The morning of Dave and Denise's wedding arrives. Everything is going wrong for the bride, who cannot stop crying. Dave, Jim, and Twiggy have drinks in the kitchen and Jim practises his father-of-the-bride speech. Cheryl thinks Twiggy is trying to "cop" with her, Nana is getting on everyone's nerves, and Antony has had a haircut.

=== Series 2 (1999) ===
No. overall	No. in series	Title	Directed by	Written by	Original release date	Viewers (millions)
Series
7	1	"Episode 1"	Steve Bendelack	Caroline Aherne, Craig Cash & Carmel Morgan	23 September 1999	7.64
Barbara and Jim are overwhelmed when Denise announces that she is pregnant. Meanwhile, Antony makes Dave and Denise a bacon sandwich because of their less-exciting tea, Dairylea on toast.
8	2	"Episode 2"	Steve Bendelack	Caroline Aherne, Craig Cash & Carmel Morgan	30 September 1999	7.40
Nana and Twiggy come round for Sunday lunch. When Barbara loses her temper during lunch, Denise suspects that her mother is going through the menopause, which Nana calls "the change."
9	3	"Episode 3"	Steve Bendelack	Caroline Aherne, Craig Cash & Carmel Morgan	7 October 1999	6.54
Jim is annoyed that Barbara has invited Nana to stay with them after her cataract operation. Antony announces that he has become the manager of a band called "Exit", which the family, especially Jim, find hysterical.
10	4	"Episode 4"	Steve Bendelack	Caroline Aherne, Craig Cash & Carmel Morgan	14 October 1999	6.69
Nana is recuperating at the Royles' after her operation, and Jim cannot hide his annoyance. Antony's band has split up.
11	5	"Episode 5"	Steve Bendelack	Caroline Aherne, Craig Cash & Carmel Morgan	21 October 1999	6.70
Barbara cries to Denise that she is sick of Jim's laziness and lack of compassion while Jim complains to Dave that the menopause is making her act like this. When Barbara storms out of the house, all Jim does is watch Who Wants to Be a Millionaire? with Dave and Denise. They go onto discuss and imitate other gameshows including Catchphrase and Play Your Cards Right. Barbara returns and Jim consoles her whilst making tea for the family.
12	6	"Episode 6"	Steve Bendelack	Caroline Aherne, Craig Cash & Carmel Morgan	28 October 1999	8.36
The Royles and all their friends gather at the house to celebrate Antony's 18th birthday. They are all nervous when they finally get to meet his girlfriend Emma.
Special
13	7	"Christmas with the Royle Family"	Steve Bendelack	Caroline Aherne, Craig Cash & Carmel Morgan	25 December 1999	10.44
The family has just finished their big Christmas Day dinner and Barbara learns that her turkey was not up to scratch. Dave has bought Denise a mobile phone for when the baby is born. Soon after Antony leaves for Emma's and Dave leaves to take Nana home, Denise goes into labour upstairs in the bathroom and Jim tries to comfort her.

=== Series 3 (2000) ===
No. overall	No. in series	Title	Directed by	Written by	Original release date	Viewers (millions)
Series
14	1	"Episode 1"	Caroline Aherne	Caroline Aherne & Craig Cash	16 October 2000	9.93
Denise and Dave bring their newborn, Baby David, to visit his grandparents, and Barbara is shocked that Denise is leaving all the work to Dave; Antony brings over Darren, who was caught attempting to steal a fridge/freezer from his workplace.
15	2	"Episode 2"	Caroline Aherne	Caroline Aherne & Craig Cash	23 October 2000	9.27
Baby David has spent the night with Barbara and Jim so Denise and Dave could go to the pub for their anniversary. They arrive with hangovers. Meanwhile, Joe has cut his hand while grating cheese for Cheryl.
16	3	"Episode 3"	Caroline Aherne	Caroline Aherne & Craig Cash	30 October 2000	9.48
Jim and Twiggy decorate the dining area for Baby David's christening by scraping off the wallpaper and blackmail Dave into helping. Meanwhile, Barbara chats to Denise and Cheryl while cooking bacon sandwiches for everyone.
17	4	"Episode 4"	Caroline Aherne	Caroline Aherne & Craig Cash	6 November 2000	8.35
When Nana and Barbara return from the funeral of Nana's old neighbour Elsie, Jim becomes annoyed at Nana's fluctuations between mourning and planning to pilfer in Elsie's flat.
18	5	"Episode 5"	Caroline Aherne	Caroline Aherne & Craig Cash	13 November 2000	8.95
Antony announces that he and Darren are going to London to find a record deal for their band. While Jim continues to pour scorn on their plans, Nana contributes £3 to their trip.
19	6	"Episode 6"	Caroline Aherne	Caroline Aherne & Craig Cash	27 November 2000	9.56
On the day of Baby David's christening, everyone gathers at the Royles' for Barbara's celebratory buffet; Twiggy brings his new girlfriend Michelle. Denise worries that she has nothing to talk about with Baby David, and Antony announces that he and Emma are getting married, which makes Barbara and Jim think she might be pregnant.
Special
20	7	"The Royle Family at Christmas"	Caroline Aherne	Caroline Aherne & Craig Cash	25 December 2000	9.78
Baby David's first birthday comes around and the Royles sit down for Christmas dinner, joined by Darren and Emma, who is pregnant, and her parents. Emma's father Roger constantly boasts about his wealth, which annoys Jim. After they leave, Jim's mood brightens when he receives a Christmas gift of Sky TV.

=== Specials (2006–2012) ===
No.	Title	Directed by	Written by	Original release date	Viewers (millions)
21	"The Queen of Sheba"	Mark Mylod	Caroline Aherne, Craig Cash & Phil Mealey	29 October 2006	8.28
Denise and Dave are expecting their second baby; Antony has a son named Lewis but is separated from Emma; and Cheryl is actively on the lookout for a boyfriend. Nana is bedridden and has moved in with the Royles. Denise delivers a daughter and names her after Nana; soon after, Nana's condition worsens and she dies.
22	"The New Sofa"	Caroline Aherne	Caroline Aherne, Craig Cash & Phil Mealey	25 December 2008	10.60
Denise, inspired by Nigella Lawson, decides to cook Christmas dinner for the family. She and Dave invite Jim and Barbara over for the day, and, much to Jim's dismay, Dave's parents, Jocelyn and Dave Sr.
23	"The Golden Egg Cup"	Caroline Aherne	Caroline Aherne, Craig Cash & Phil Mealey	25 December 2009	11.74
To celebrate their 50th wedding anniversary, Jim and Barbara go to Prestatyn in Wales to stay in a holiday caravan, along with Dave and Denise. With no television or chip pan, the holiday is a disaster and they decide to return home early.
24	"Joe's Crackers"	Caroline Aherne	Caroline Aherne, Craig Cash & Phil Mealey	25 December 2010	11.29
With Jim out of action from an unfortunate incident in The Precinct, Barbara is up to her eyes in arranging Christmas Day at the Royles'. Dave and Denise, feeling the recession the most, worry that Antony's lavish gifts will eclipse their gift of a fridge magnet. Antony and his heavily pregnant girlfriend Saskia get a surprise delivery. Barbara's new Dyson vacuum cleaner causes a slight mishap involving Mary's cremated remains, whilst Joe reminisces about a tipsy evening of naked wrestling with Bobby Carter in front of the fire, while Cheryl recounts her romantic encounter in the local supermarket's car park.
25	"Barbara's Old Ring"	Caroline Aherne	Caroline Aherne, Craig Cash & Phil Mealey	25 December 2012	9.90
Barbara has lost her wedding ring; Jim is trying to earn a fortune via scratch cards; Dave has an idea of an invention he hopes to pitch on Dragons' Den; Joe is looking for love, and a new neighbour causes havoc in the Royle household.

== Charity Specials ==
Title	Directed by	Written by	Original release date	Viewers (millions)
"Shaggy Dog Story Sketch"	Unknown	Unknown	25 December 1999	Unknown
A Sketch with Denise Best, Dave Best and a bunch of other characters about one joke.
"Children in Need Sketch"	Caroline Aherne	Caroline Aherne, Craig Cash and Phil Mealey	31 October 2008	9.83
It is Children in Need night and Barbara tells Denise and Dave that Jim is generously donating some money, as Jim searched for it in his armchair.
"Comic Relief Sketch"	Caroline Aherne	Caroline Aherne, Craig Cash and Phil Mealey	18 March 2009	9.84
On Comic Relief Night 2009, Jim has the flu and Antony comes to the house after raising £400 for Comic Relief by skydiving from a plane.
"Comic Relief Sketch"	Caroline Aherne		15 March 2013	
Comic Relief Night 2013. The Royles remind viewers of the telephone number needed to call Comic Relief.

== Ratings ==
The Royle Family : UK viewers per episode (millions)

Season	Episode number							Average
Season	1	2	3	4	5	6	7	Average
1	3.83	3.69	3.86	4.20	4.07	4.86	–	4.09
2	7.64	7.40	6.54	6.69	6.70	8.36	10.44	7.68
3	9.93	9.27	9.48	8.35	8.95	9.56	9.78	9.33
Specials	8.28	10.60	11.74	11.29	9.90	–		10.36

Audience measurement performed by Broadcasters' Audience Research Board
