= Jack and Finn Harries =

British filmmakers and YouTubers

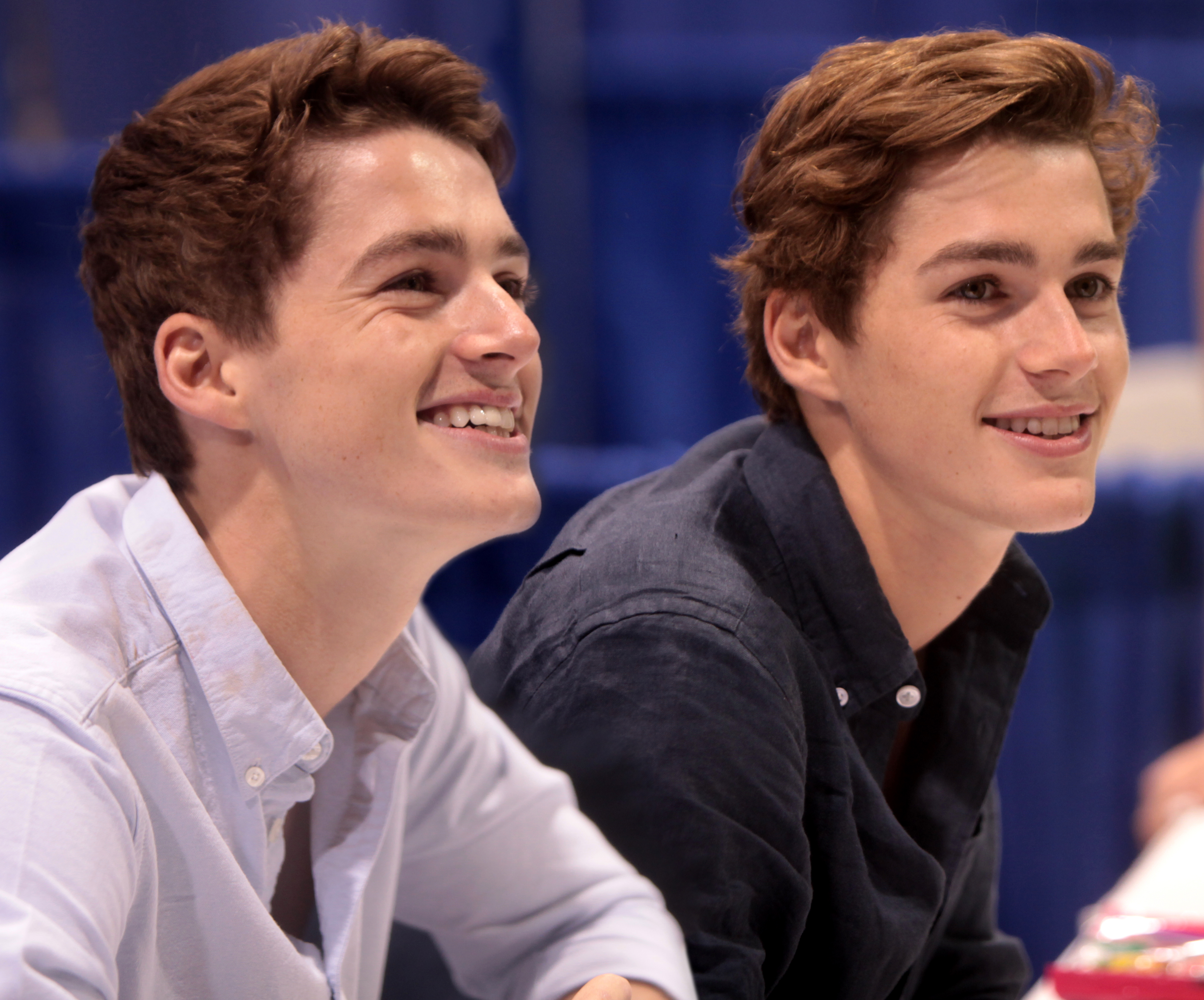
- Jack and Finn Harries in 2014
- Born: Jackson Frayn Harries; Finnegan Charles Frayn Harries; 13 May 1993 (age 33)
- Education: The Harrodian School
- Occupations: YouTubers; filmmakers; climate activists
- Parents: Andy Harries (father); Rebecca Frayn (mother)
- Relatives: Michael Frayn (grandfather)

YouTube information
- Channel: JackHarries
- Years active: 2011–2015, 2018–present
- Genres: Video blogs, documentary
- Subscribers: 3.62 million
- Views: 141.9 million
- Last updated: 16 August 2025

Jackson Frayn "Jack" Harries and Finnegan Charles Frayn "Finn" Harries (born 13 May 1993) are British filmmakers, YouTubers and climate activists. The identical twins' YouTube channel JacksGap was originally created by Jack Harries to document his gap year in mid-2011, the channel experienced a rapid increase in popularity after the addition of Finn Harries as a regular contributor. In February 2017 the Twitter and Instagram accounts for JacksGap were deleted, followed by the dissolution of the JacksGap brand.

== JacksGap ==
Jackson and Finnegan Harries are sons of Andy Harries, a film and television director and producer, and filmmaker and writer Rebecca Frayn. Their maternal grandfather is the playwright and novelist Michael Frayn (now married to biographer Claire Tomalin). They attended The Harrodian School at Barnes, south-west London.

JacksGap was originally launched in July 2011 by Jack Harries during his gap year after he had left school. The main purpose of the channel was to document Jack's gap year. By September 2012 the site had 190,000 subscribers and the pay-per-click advertising revenue was enough to entirely finance the Harries' travels in Thailand. After Finn joined the channel, the views nearly doubled. Jack Harries attended Bristol University, studying drama, but dropped out in 2013 after the first year to focus on YouTube.

JacksGap attracted teenage girls in particular, with 88% of subscribers in this demographic.

In 2013 the twins began to create 15-minute-long episodes about their travels in India, funding the venture with £20,000 from Skype, Sony and MyDestination.

In January 2015, JacksGap posted a video called "Let's Talk About Mental Health" that was later referenced in an article on The Huffington Post in which he addresses the importance of starting an open conversation about mental health in order to reduce the stigma attached to it.

In April 2015, JacksGap posted a video called "What Do You Believe In?" that announced Finn had moved to New York City earlier that year to study Design and Architecture for three and a half years at the Parsons School of Design, though he was still a part of JacksGap.

== Environmental activism ==
Jack Harries traveled to Bhutan as a WWF ambassador in December 2018 and filmed a short film with his brother and a team of filmmakers called The Kingdom. In February 2019, Jack Harries and eight other Extinction Rebellion activists were arrested for aggravated trespass and criminal damage after they glued themselves to the front of a hotel in London during a protest at an international petroleum conference. In a BBC interview, Jack said it was worth it to bring awareness to the cause. He was later acquitted of the charges. In 2020, the brothers and filmmaker Alice Aedy founded Earthrise Studio, a media company focused on climate change. In 2021, Jack hosted a web series called Seat at the Table in which he interviewed people such as Barack Obama and David Attenborough. In 2025, Jack was included on The King's Foundation's "35 under 35" list of changemakers.
