= Sunshine (British TV series) =

2008 British TV comedy drama

- Genre: Drama
- Created by: Craig Cash and Phil Mealey
- Starring: Steve Coogan; Lisa Millett; Dominic Senior; Bernard Hill; Craig Cash; Phil Mealey; Alex Bain; Stephen Marcus; Daniel Ryan; Geoffrey Hutchings; Peter Wight; Joan Kempson; Tony Mooney; Caroline Aherne; Rodney Litchfield
- Country of origin: United Kingdom
- Original language: English
- No. of episodes: 3

Production
- Running time: 60 minutes

Original release
- Network: BBC One
- Release: 7 October – 21 October 2008

Sunshine is a three-part comedy drama that began on 7 October 2008 on BBC One, from the co-writers of The Royle Family and Early Doors. These co-writers, Craig Cash and Phil Mealey, also appear in the series.

== Plot ==
Bob 'Bing' Crosby (Steve Coogan) has always been popular with friends and others around his area but he has a gambling problem, meaning he cannot resist the temptation to bet on horse races.

Bernadette (Lisa Millett) is Bob's childhood friend who became his lover and is now the mother of their son Joe, played by actor Dominic Senior. While she has often been angered by her husband's casual gambling habits, she has always forgiven him. When Bob bets more money and the stakes are raised, he could lose everything, including the wife and son he loves.

At the end of the first episode, he bets his family's Disneyland fund on a 'dead cert' and loses it all. Bernadette kicks him out of the house, and he goes to sleep in the box room at his father's house.

Bernadette and Joe move to a flat to the reduced living costs - they are unable to afford a house because of Bing's absence. Joe begins to save up to buy his father a television.

However, Bing steals this money to gamble. He returns home, and is confronted by his father. Bing reveals that he was unable to do it and returns the money. He admits that he has a gambling problem.

== Reception ==
Sam Wollaston reviewed the first episode for The Guardian liked Coogan's lead performance saying "once you get used to him being a charming idiot rather than a comic genius, he's actually pretty good at it: acting, I mean." However, he was unsure of what the drama was: "I've gone from chuckling gently - maybe a bit too gently - to weeping. Not proper wailing, just sniffing a bit. And that I think is the problem, we've gone from snug comedy to gritty northern drama. Kind of - because it's neither one thing nor t'other, as they say up there." Nancy Banks-Smith looked at the last episode for the same paper, and suggested "Bernard Hill gave a simply magnificent performance as the dying grandfather in Sunshine (BBC1), against some formidable scene-stealers.".

The Independent noted "the writers have a good ear for inadvertent, glancing comedy" and concluded "it’s possible to believe that these people are real enough to care about, and real enough to feel some pain." in their review.

Ian Semel, the head of gambling addiction helpline Gambling Therapy, thought Sunshine was "a fantastic illustration of the archetypal problem gambler" and that he was "going to get all my counsellors to watch it."
