= National Comedy Awards =

British awards ceremony

- National Comedy Awards 2022 logo
- Awarded for: Most popular in Comedy
- Location: London Palladium (1990); The London Studios (1991–2009); Indigo at The O2 (2010); Fountain Studios (2011–2014); Roundhouse (2022–2023)
- Country: United Kingdom
- Presented by: Michael Parkinson (1990); Jonathan Ross (1991–2007, 2009–2014); Angus Deayton (2008); Tom Allen (2022–2023)
- First award: 1990; 2022 (revival)
- Final award: 2014; 2023 (revival)
- Website: Official website

Television/radio coverage
- Network: ITV (1990–2006, 2008–2009); Channel 4 (2011–2014, 2022–2023)
- Produced by: Michael Hurll Television (1990–2014); Unique TV / CPL Productions (1990–2014); Hungry Bear Media (2022–2023)

The National Comedy Awards (known as the British Comedy Awards from 1990 to 2014) was an annual awards ceremony in the United Kingdom, celebrating notable comedians and entertainment performances of the previous year.

== The British Comedy Awards (1990–2014) ==
Logo for the 2009 British Comedy Awards

The awards were shown live on ITV in December from 1990 to 2006, after which the broadcast of the British Comedy Awards 2007 was suspended by ITV due to allegations of irregularities and deception in the awarding of the 2005 People's Choice Award and then ongoing related investigations about the 2007 British premium-rate phone-in scandal resulting in Ofcom's subsequently fining ITV a record £5.675 million for its misuse of premium-rate telephone lines.

After Michael Parkinson presented the inaugural ceremony at the London Palladium in December 1990, the majority of subsequent shows were presented by Jonathan Ross, staged at London Studios, and produced by Michael Hurll Television (MHTV), whose parent company is Unique Communications Group. Ross did not present the 2008 awards, in light of The Russell Brand Show prank calls and was replaced for that year by Angus Deayton.

The 2007 show occurred on 6 December 2007, but was not televised due to the 2005 controversy and subsequent investigations. The following years ceremony was shown live on 6 December 2008. Compliance for the show was the responsibility of the ITV Compliance Unit of ITV Network Limited (consisting of members from ITV plc, STV Group, UTV Media, and Channel Television Ltd).

In June 2010, it was announced that awards were to be broadcast on Channel 4 for three years, which was later extended for one more year. Shortly afterwards, the 2010 ceremony was postponed until it finally aired in January 2011. In June 2015 Channel 4 announced they would be dropping the ceremony.

=== Winners ===
==== 1990s ====
===== 1990 =====
1990 Reference:

- Best new TV comedy: Drop the Dead Donkey
- Top TV comedy actor: David Jason
- Top TV comedy actress: Jean Boht
- Top TV comedy newcomer: Pauline Quirke
- Top British film actor: Griff Rhys Jones
- Top British film actress: Pauline Collins
- Top live stand up: Victoria Wood
- Top British TV comedy: A Bit of a Do
- Top ITV/C4 sitcom: A Bit of a Do
- Top BBC sitcom: Only Fools and Horses
- Top US sitcom: Cheers
- Top entertainment performer: Rowan Atkinson
- Top variety act: Russ Abbot
- Top comedy film: Shirley Valentine
- Top radio comedy: Victor Lewis-Smith
- Best stage comedy newcomer: Mike Doyle
- WGGB Award For Top Comedy Writer: David Nobbs
- Lifetime achievement award for stage: Norman Wisdom
- Lifetime achievement award for radio: Roy Hudd
- Lifetime achievement award for film comedy: Peter Rogers (Carry On films producer)
- Lifetime achievement award: Ronnie Barker

===== 1991 =====
1991 Reference:

- Best new TV comedy: Have I Got News for You
- Best TV comedy actor: Richard Wilson (One Foot in the Grave)
- Best TV comedy actress: Patricia Routledge
- Top TV comedy newcomer: Angus Deayton
- Best TV Entertainment presenter: Clive Anderson (Whose Line Is It Anyway)
- Best ITV/C4 sitcom: Drop the Dead Donkey
- Best entertainment series: Alas Smith and Jones
- Top entertainment presenter: Clive Anderson
- Top British entertainment performers: Mel Smith and Griff Rhys Jones
- Top variety performers: Vic Reeves and Bob Mortimer
- Best comedy film: Home Alone
- Best radio comedy: On the Hour/The Million Pound Radio Show
- Top radio comedy personality: Phil Holden
- Top stage newcomer: Jack Dee
- Top comedy club performer: Jeremy Hardy
- WGGB Award For Top Comedy Writer: John Sullivan
- Lifetime achievement: Beryl Reid
- International lifetime achievement: George Burns

===== 1992 =====
1992 Reference:

- Best new TV comedy: Bottom
- Best TV comedy actor: David Jason (The Darling Buds of May)
- Best TV comedy actress: Stephanie Cole (Waiting For God)
- Best TV comedy newcomer: Alan Cumming (Bernard and the Genie)
- Top TV comedy personality: Paul Merton
- Top variety performer: Les Dawson
- Best sitcom: One Foot in the Grave
- Best ITV comedy: Men Behaving Badly
- Best BBC sitcom: One Foot in the Grave
- Best C4 sitcom: Desmond's
- Best TV comedy drama: Murder Most Horrid
- Best C4 personality: Chris Evans
- Best comedy film: Hear My Song
- Top comedy club performer: Jo Brand
- WGGB Award For Top Comedy Writer: David Renwick
- Lifetime Achievement: Eric Sykes

===== 1993 =====
1993 Reference:

- Best new TV comedy: Absolutely Fabulous
- Best comedy actor: Rik Mayall (Rik Mayall Presents)
- Best comedy actress: Joanna Lumley (Absolutely Fabulous)
- Top TV comedy newcomer: Steve Coogan
- Top C4 entertainment presenter: Chris Evans
- Best radio comedy: Knowing Me, Knowing You
- Top variety entertainer: Ken Dodd
- Best entertainment series: Barrymore
- Best BBC sitcom: One Foot in the Grave
- Best ITV sitcom: Watching
- Best C4 sitcom: Drop The Dead Donkey
- Best TV comedy drama: The Snapper
- Top TV personality: Joanna Lumley
- Top female performer: Jennifer Saunders and Dawn French
- Best comedy film: Groundhog Day
- Top stand-up: Eddie Izzard
- WGGB Award For Top Comedy Writer: Richard Curtis
- Lifetime achievement award: Ken Dodd

===== 1994 =====
1994 Reference:

- Best comedy series: Murder Most Horrid
- Best new TV comedy: Knowing Me, Knowing You... with Alan Partridge
- Top TV comedy actor: Stephen Tompkinson (Drop The Dead Donkey)
- Top TV comedy actress: Brenda Blethyn (Outside Edge)
- Best TV comedy newcomer: Chris Morris (The Day Today)
- Best TV comedy series: Drop The Dead Donkey
- Best BBC comedy series: Red Dwarf
- Best C4 comedy: Drop The Dead Donkey
- Best ITV comedy: Time After Time
- Best comedy drama: Outside Edge
- Best male TV performer: Steve Coogan (Knowing Me, Knowing You... with Alan Partridge)
- Top female comedy performer: Tracey Ullman (Tracey Ullman Takes on New York)
- Best ITV entertainment presenter: Michael Barrymore
- Best BBC entertainment presenter: Noel Edmonds
- Best Channel 4 entertainment presenter: Chris Evans (Don't Forget Your Toothbrush)
- Top theatre variety performer: Billy Pearce
- Best comedy film: Four Weddings and a Funeral
- Top comedy writer: Jack Rosenthal
- Best radio comedy: A Look Back to the Future
- Best live stand-up: Phil Kay
- WGGB Award For Top Comedy Writer: Jack Rosenthal
- Special award for Comedy: Armando Iannucci
- Lifetime achievement: Spike Milligan, June Whitfield

===== 1995 =====
1995 Reference:

- Best comedy show: Rory Bremner Who Else
- Best new TV comedy: Father Ted
- Top TV comedy actor: Martin Clunes (Men Behaving Badly)
- Top TV comedy actress: Caroline Quentin (Men Behaving Badly)
- Top TV comedy newcomer: Ardal O'Hanlon (Father Ted)
- Top female comedy performer: Victoria Wood
- Top male comedy performers: John Bird and John Fortune
- Best radio comedy: I'm Sorry I Haven't a Clue
- Best BBC comedy series: One Foot in the Grave
- Best ITV entertainment presenter: Michael Barrymore
- Best BBC entertainment presenter: Noel Edmonds
- Best Channel 4 entertainment presenter: Chris Evans
- Top TV personality: Jack Dee
- Best ITV sitcom: Is It Legal?
- Best BBC sitcom: One Foot in the Grave
- Best Channel 4 sitcom: Drop The Dead Donkey
- Best comedy drama: Preston Front
- Best entertainment series: Don't Forget Your Toothbrush
- Best comedy film: Bullets Over Broadway
- Best stand-up comic: Jo Brand
- WGGB Award For Top Comedy Writer: Andy Hamilton and Guy Jenkin
- Lifetime achievement for variety: Bruce Forsyth
- Lifetime achievement for comedy: Bob Monkhouse
- Award for comedy: Peter Cook

===== 1996 =====
1996 Reference:

- Best comedy series: The Fast Show
- Best new TV comedy: Thin Blue Line
- Top TV comedy actor: Dermot Morgan (Father Ted)
- Top TV comedy actress: Pauline McLynn (Father Ted)
- Top TV newcomer: James Dreyfus (The Thin Blue Line)
- Best BBC sitcom: One Foot in the Grave
- Best ITV sitcom: The 10%ers
- Top ITV entertainment presenter: Cilla Black
- Top BBC1 entertainment presenter: Ruby Wax
- Top C4/BBC2 entertainment presenter: Chris Evans (TFI Friday)
- Best children's comedy: Woof!
- Top female comedy performer: Caroline Aherne (Mrs Merton)
- Top male comedy performer: Paul Whitehouse (The Fast Show)
- Best comedy film: Babe
- Best radio comedy: People Like Us
- Best comedy drama: Outside Edge
- Best entertainment series: TFI Friday
- International comedy: Frasier
- Top TV comedy personalities: Vic Reeves and Bob Mortimer
- Best stand-up: Eddie Izzard
- WGGB Award For Top Comedy Writer: Johnny Speight
- Lifetime achievement award: Dave Allen

===== 1997 =====
1997 Reference:

- Best comedy show: The Fast Show
- Best new TV comedy: The Harry Hill Show
- Best TV comedy actor: David Jason (Only Fools and Horses)
- Best TV comedy actress: Dawn French (The Vicar of Dibley)
- Top comedy newcomer: Graham Norton
- Best C4 sitcom: Father Ted
- Top BBC1 personality: Caroline Aherne
- Top ITV personality: Cilla Black
- Top BBC2/C4 personality: Paul Whitehouse
- Best radio comedy: People Like Us
- Best comedy film: The Full Monty
- Cockburn's funniest comedy moment: Only Fools and Horses
- Best international comedy: The Larry Sanders Show
- Best BBC sitcom: One Foot in the Grave Christmas Special
- Best ITV sitcom: Faith in the Future
- Best Channel 4 sitcom: Father Ted Christmas Special
- Best BBC comedy drama: The Missing Postman
- Best ITV comedy drama: Cold Feet
- Best children's comedy: My Dad's A Boring Nerd
- Best entertainment programme: An Evening With Lily Savage
- Top stand-up comic: Jack Dee
- People's Choice: Only Fools and Horses
- WGGB achievement award: Ray Galton and Alan Simpson
- Lifetime achievement award: Stanley Baxter

===== 1998 =====
1998 Reference:

- Best comedy series: Goodness Gracious Me
- Best new TV comedy: The Royle Family
- Best TV comedy actor: Steve Coogan (I'm Alan Partridge)
- Best TV comedy actress: Emma Chambers (The Vicar of Dibley)
- Top TV comedy newcomer: Dylan Moran (How Do You Want Me?)
- Best TV sitcom: I'm Alan Partridge
- Best light entertainment series: Who Wants to Be a Millionaire?
- Top BBC1 comedy personality: Harry Enfield
- Top BBC2 personality: Steve Coogan
- Top ITV personality: Michael Barrymore
- Best children's comedy: Sooty & Co
- Best television comedy drama: Underworld
- Best comedy film: Lock, Stock and Two Smoking Barrels
- Best radio comedy: Old Harry's Game
- Best stand-up comedian: Tommy Tiernan
- WGGB writer of the year award: Denis Norden and (posthumously) Frank Muir
- People's Choice: One Foot in the Grave
- Lifetime achievement award: Dame Thora Hird

===== 1999 =====
1999 Reference:

- Best new TV comedy: Dinnerladies
- Best TV comedy actor: Ricky Tomlinson (The Royle Family)
- Best TV comedy actress: Caroline Aherne (The Royle Family, Mrs Merton and Malcolm).
- Best male comedy newcomer: Sacha Baron Cohen (The 11 O'Clock Show)
- Best female comedy newcomer: Jessica Hynes (Spaced, The Royle Family)
- Best comedy entertainment personality: Paul Merton
- Best 'broken comedy': Big Train
- Best comedy gameshow: Have I Got News for You
- Best comedy talkshow: So Graham Norton
- Best TV sitcom: The Royle Family
- Best TV comedy-drama: Cold Feet
- Best comedy film: Notting Hill
- Best international comedy show: The Larry Sanders Show
- Best comedy entertainment programme: Comic Relief
- Best radio comedy: The Sunday Format
- Best live stand-up: Bill Bailey
- WGGB Award For Top Comedy Writer: Richard Curtis
- Lifetime achievement award: Barry Humphries, The Two Ronnies

==== 2000s ====
===== 2000 =====
2000 Reference:

- Best TV comedy: Dinnerladies
- Best new TV comedy: That Peter Kay Thing
- Best TV comedy actor: James Nesbitt (Cold Feet)
- Best TV comedy actress: Sue Johnston (The Royle Family)
- Best TV comedy newcomer: Rob Brydon (Marion and Geoff)
- Best TV comedy-drama: Cold Feet
- Best TV comedy personality: Graham Norton
- Best comedy entertainment programme: Alistair McGowan's Big Impression
- Best comedy film: East Is East
- Best international TV show: The Simpsons
- Best of British: The Vicar of Dibley
- Best live comic: Sean Lock
- People's Choice: SMTV Live
- WGGB writer of the year: Victoria Wood
- Lifetime achievement award: Alan Bennett

===== 2001 =====
2001 Reference:

- Best TV comedy: One Foot in the Grave
- Best new TV comedy: The Office
- Best TV comedy actor: Rob Brydon (Human Remains)
- Best TV comedy actress: Ronni Ancona
- Best comedy newcomer: Johnny Vegas
- Best comedy entertainment personality: Frank Skinner
- Best TV comedy drama: Bob and Rose
- Best comedy entertainment programme: So Graham Norton
- Best international comedy TV show: Seinfeld
- Best radio comedy: Dead Ringers
- Best comedy film: Best in Show
- Best live stand-up: Victoria Wood (Award not presented on night)
- The AOL people's choice: Cold Feet (Voted by viewing audience)
- Writer of the year: Russell T Davies
- Lifetime achievement award: David Jason

===== 2002 =====
2002 Reference:

- Best TV Comedy: The Office
- Best new TV comedy: The Kumars at No. 42
- Best comedy actor: Ricky Gervais (The Office)
- Best comedy actress: Kathy Burke (Gimme Gimme Gimme)
- Best comedy newcomer: Kris Marshall (My Family)
- Best comedy entertainment Personality: Graham Norton
- Best comedy drama: Auf Wiedersehen, Pet
- Best comedy entertainment programme: V Graham Norton
- Best international comedy show: Six Feet Under
- Best comedy film: Bend It Like Beckham
- People's choice award: Peter Kay's Phoenix Nights
- Writer of the year: Peter Kay
- Lifetime achievement award: Michael Palin

===== 2003 =====
2003 Reference:

- Best TV comedy: Coupling
- Best new TV comedy: My New Best Friend
- Best comedy actor: Steve Coogan
- Best comedy actress: Ronni Ancona
- Best comedy newcomer: David Walliams (Little Britain)
- Best entertainment personality: Ant & Dec
- Best comedy drama: Cold Feet
- Best comedy entertainment programme: Friday Night with Jonathan Ross
- International comedy show: Malcolm in the Middle
- Best comedy film: Calendar Girls
- People's choice award: Ant & Dec's Saturday Night Takeaway
- Writer of the year: Mike Bullen
- Lifetime achievement award: Jimmy Perry and David Croft

===== 2004 =====
2004 Reference:

- Best TV comedy: Little Britain
- Best new TV comedy: Nighty Night
- Best TV comedy actor: Matt Lucas and David Walliams
- Best TV comedy actress: Caroline Quentin
- Best comedy newcomer: Catherine Tate
- Best comedy entertainment personality: Ant & Dec
- Best comedy entertainment programme: Ant & Dec's Saturday Night Takeaway
- Best TV comedy drama: Doc Martin
- Best international comedy show: The Simpsons
- Best comedy film: School of Rock
- People's choice award: Little Britain
- Writers of the Year: Ricky Gervais and Stephen Merchant
- Outstanding achievement: Matt Groening, French and Saunders

===== 2005 =====
2005 Reference:

- Best TV comedy: Little Britain
- Best new TV comedy: The Thick of It
- Best TV comedy actor: Chris Langham
- Best TV comedy actress: Ashley Jensen
- Best comedy newcomer: Ashley Jensen
- Best international Show: The Simpsons
- Best entertainment Programme: The X Factor
- Best comedy drama: Shameless
- Best comedy entertainment Personality: Paul O'Grady
- Best comedy film: Festival
- People's choice award: The Catherine Tate Show declared actual winner (2008); "mistakenly" awarded to Ant & Dec's Saturday Night Takeaway (2005)
- Ronnie Barker Writers of the year: Matt Lucas and David Walliams
- Outstanding achievement: Julie Walters and Victoria Wood

===== 2006 =====
2006 Reference:

- Best Comedy Entertainment Programme: Harry Hill's TV Burp
- Best Comedy Film: Wallace & Gromit: The Curse of the Were-Rabbit
- Best International Comedy TV Show: Curb Your Enthusiasm
- Britain's Best New TV Comedy: Star Stories
- Best TV Comedy: Peep Show
- Best Stage Comedy: Little Britain Live
- People's Choice Award: Ant and Dec's Saturday Night Takeaway
- Best TV Comedy Actor: Stephen Merchant
- Best TV Comedy Actress: Catherine Tate
- Best TV Comedy Entertainment Personality: Harry Hill
- Best Male Comedy Newcomer: Russell Brand
- Best Female Comedy Newcomer: Charlotte Church
- Best Live Standup Tour: Jimmy Carr
- Ronnie Barker Award: Sacha Baron Cohen, Peter Baynham, Anthony Hines, Dan Mazer
- Writers' Guild of Great Britain Special Award: Jonathan Ross
- Outstanding Contribution To Entertainment: Chris Tarrant

===== 2007 =====
2007 Reference:

- Best New Comedy Entertainment Programme: Al Murray's Happy Hour
- Best Comedy Film: The Simpsons Movie
- Best International Comedy TV Show: Curb Your Enthusiasm
- Britain's Best New TV Comedy: Gavin & Stacey
- Best TV Comedy: Peep Show
- Best TV Comedy Actor: David Mitchell (Peep Show)
- Best TV Comedy Actress: Liz Smith (The Royle Family: The Queen of Sheba)
- Best Comedy Entertainment Personality: Simon Amstell (Never Mind The Buzzcocks)
- Best Male Comedy Newcomer: James Corden
- Best Female Comedy Newcomer: Ruth Jones (Gavin & Stacey)
- Best Live Standup: Alan Carr
- Ronnie Barker Award: Simon Pegg
- British Comedy Lifetime Achievement Award: Stephen Fry

===== 2008 =====
2008 Reference:

- Best Comedy Entertainment Programme: Harry Hill's TV Burp
- Best Comedy Film: Hot Fuzz
- Britain's Best New British TV Comedy: The Inbetweeners
- Best TV Comedy: Gavin & Stacey
- Best TV Comedy Actor: Ricky Gervais (Extras)
- Best TV Comedy Actress: Sharon Horgan (Pulling)
- Best Comedy Entertainment Personality: Alan Carr (The Sunday Night Project)
- Best Male Comedy Newcomer: Simon Bird
- Best Female Comedy Newcomer: Katy Brand
- Best TV Comedy Drama: Drop Dead Gorgeous
- Best Live Standup Performer: Russell Brand
- Best Comedy Panel Show: QI
- Ronnie Barker Award: David Renwick
- British Comedy Lifetime Achievement Award: Jasper Carrott
- Outstanding Contribution to Comedy: Geoffrey Perkins

===== 2009 =====
2009 Reference:

- Best Comedy Entertainment Programme: Harry Hill's TV Burp
- Best Situation Comedy: Outnumbered
- Best New British TV Comedy: Psychoville
- Best Comedy Panel Show: Have I Got News for You
- Best TV Comedy Drama: Pulling Special
- Outstanding Contribution to Comedy: Peter Kay
- Best Television Comedy Actress: Katherine Parkinson (The IT Crowd)
- Best Television Comedy Actor: Simon Bird (The Inbetweeners)
- Best Comedy Entertainment Personality: Harry Hill
- Ronnie Barker Award: Graham Linehan
- Best Comedy Film: In the Loop
- Best Live Standup Performer: Michael McIntyre
- Best British Comedy: Outnumbered
- British Lifetime Achievement Award: Terry Wogan
- Best Male Comedy Newcomer: Charlie Brooker (You Have Been Watching)
- Best Female Comedy Newcomer: Ramona Marquez (Outnumbered)
- Best Sketch Show: Harry & Paul

==== 2010s ====
===== 2010 =====
2010 Reference:

- Best Comedy Entertainment Programme: Newswipe
- Best Comedy Panel Show: Would I Lie To You?
- Best Comedy Entertainment Personality: Harry Hill
- Best Male TV Comic: Michael McIntyre
- Best Female TV Comic: Jo Brand
- British Comedy Academy Lifetime Achievement Award: Roy Clarke
- Best New British TV Comedy: Miranda
- Best Male Comedy Breakthrough Artist: John Bishop
- Best Female Comedy Breakthrough Artist: Samantha Spiro (Grandma's House)
- Best Sketch Show: Horrible Histories
- Best Sitcom: The Inbetweeners
- Writers' Guild of Great Britain Award: Sam Bain and Jesse Armstrong
- Best TV Comedy Actor: Peter Capaldi
- Best TV Comedy Actress: Miranda Hart
- Best Comedy Performance in a British Film: Kayvan Novak
- People's Choice Award for the King Or Queen of Comedy 2010: Miranda Hart

===== 2011 =====
2011 Reference:

- Best Comedy Entertainment Programme: Stewart Lee's Comedy Vehicle
- Best Comedy Panel Show: Shooting Stars
- Best Comedy Entertainment Personality: Graham Norton
- Best Male TV Comic: Stewart Lee
- Best Female TV Comic: Victoria Wood
- British Comedy Academy Lifetime Achievement Award: Have I Got News for You
- Best New Comedy Programme: Fresh Meat
- Best Sketch Show: Horrible Histories
- Best Sitcom: Twenty Twelve
- Best Comedy Drama: Psychoville
- British Comedy Academy Outstanding Achievement: The Inbetweeners
- Best Comedy Breakthrough Artist: Angelos Neil Epithemiou
- Writers' Guild of Great Britain Award: Armando Iannucci
- Best TV Comedy Actor: Darren Boyd
- Best TV Comedy Actress: Miranda Hart
- People's Choice Award for the King or Queen of Comedy 2011: Sarah Millican
- Channel 4 Award for Special Contribution to Comedy: Lee Evans

===== 2012 =====
2012 Reference:

- Best Comedy Entertainment Personality: Charlie Brooker
- Best Sitcom: Hunderby
- Best Male Television Comic: Lee Mack
- Best Comedy Entertainment Programme: Harry Hill's TV Burp
- Best Comedy Breakthrough Artist: Morgana Robinson
- Best TV Comedy Actress: Rebecca Front
- Best New Comedy Programme: Hunderby
- Best Female Television Comic: Jo Brand
- Best Sketch Show: Cardinal Burns
- People's Choice Award for the King or Queen of Comedy 2012: Jack Whitehall
- Writers' Guild Award: Reeves and Mortimer
- Best TV Comedy Actor: Peter Capaldi
- British Comedy Academy Outstanding Achievement Award: Sacha Baron Cohen

===== 2013 =====
The 2013 awards were presented at a two-hour ceremony hosted by Jonathan Ross on 12 December and shown live on Channel 4.

- Best Comedy Panel Show: Would I Lie to You?
- Best Comedy Entertainment Personality: Alan Carr
- Best Sitcom: Getting On
- Best Male Television Comic: Lee Mack
- Best Comedy Entertainment Programme: The Graham Norton Show
- Best Comedy Breakthrough Artist: Adam Hills
- Best TV Comedy Actress: Miranda Hart
- Best New Comedy Programme: Plebs
- Best Female Television Comic: Nina Conti
- Best Sketch Show: Harry & Paul
- People's Choice Award for the King or Queen of Comedy 2013: Jack Whitehall
- Writers' Guild Award: Paul Whitehouse
- Best TV Comedy Actor: Jack Whitehall
- British Comedy Academy Outstanding Achievement Award: Steve Coogan
- British Comedy International Achievement: Will Ferrell

===== 2014 =====
2014 Reference:

- Best TV Comedy Actress: Katherine Parkinson
- Best Comedy Film: The Inbetweeners 2
- Best Male Television Comic: Lee Mack
- Best Sketch Show: Harry and Paul's Story of the Twos
- Best Female Television Comic: Aisling Bea
- Best Comedy Entertainment Personality: Graham Norton
- Best TV Comedy Actor: Harry Enfield
- Best Comedy Drama: Rev
- Best New Comedy Programme: Toast of London
- Best Comedy Panel Programme: Would I Lie to You?
- Best Sitcom: Moone Boy
- King of Comedy: Jack Whitehall
- Best Comedy Breakthrough Artist: Nick Helm
- Best Comedy Entertainment Programme: The Graham Norton Show
- The Writers' Guild Award of Great Britain: Brendan O'Carroll
- British Comedy Academy Outstanding Achievement Award: Monty Python
- Best Internet Comedy Short: Carpark
- Best International Comedy Programme: Modern Family

== National Comedy Awards (2022–2023) ==
In August 2020, Channel 4 announced the launch of the National Comedy Awards, a new annual awards ceremony event with multiple categories all decided by a public vote. Produced in collaboration with Hungry Bear Media, the awards ceremony is linked to Channel 4's Stand Up to Cancer charity drive, with comedy fans being encouraged to donate in order to help accelerate life-saving research. Phil Harris, Channel 4's head of entertainment, said: "This is an award show for our times. Fans will be able to vote on the people, some established and others less so, who really make them laugh. We will be celebrating some incredible comedy talent while supporting the incredible Stand Up to Cancer. It promises to be a very special night of TV."

Aiming to celebrate "the UK's most brilliant comedy content and creators", the first ceremony was due to be held in the spring of 2021 but was postponed due to the COVID-19 pandemic, with the new date of on 15 December 2021 being set by Hungry Bear Media and Channel 4. The first ceremony was due to be held at the Roundhouse in London, with Channel 4 due to broadcast the event two days later as part of their Friday night comedy line-up. Due to the ongoing pandemic and concerns over the Omicron variant, the show was cancelled by the organisers a week before it was due to be staged and Channel 4 said that it would be rescheduled for another time.

The ceremony was finally held on 2 March 2022 and broadcast on Channel 4 three days later. The ceremony was hosted by comedian Tom Allen, with presenters including Matt Lucas, Jessica Hynes, Al Murray and Meera Syal. It included a tribute to Sean Lock.

=== Ceremonies ===
| Edition | Year | Date | Location | Host | Broadcaster |
|---|---|---|---|---|---|
| 1st | 2022 | 2 March 2022 | London Roundhouse | Tom Allen | Channel 4 |
| 2nd | 2023 | 17 February 2023 | London Roundhouse | Tom Allen | Channel 4 |

=== Categories ===
| Award | Duration |
|---|---|
| Best Comedy Entertainment Series | 2022–2023 |
| Outstanding Female Comedy Entertainment Performance | 2022–2023 |
| Outstanding Male Comedy Entertainment Performance | 2022–2023 |
| Best Scripted Comedy Series | 2022–2023 |
| Outstanding Comedy Actress | 2022–2023 |
| Outstanding Comedy Actor | 2022–2023 |
| Outstanding Supporting Role | 2022–2023 |
| Best Comedy Podcast | 2022–2023 |
| Best Stand Up Show | 2022–2023 |
| Best Comedy Panel Show | 2023 |
| Comedy Breakthrough Award | 2022–2023 |
| Caroline Aherne Writers Award | 2022 |
| Victoria Wood Lifetime Achievement Award | 2022 |
| Impact in Comedy | 2023 |
| Comedy Game Changer | 2023 |

=== Awards ===
==== 2022 ====
| Category | Winner | Nominations |
|---|---|---|
| Best Comedy Entertainment Series | Taskmaster | 8 Out of 10 Cats Does Countdown; Rob & Romesh Vs; Would I Lie To You? |
| Outstanding Female Comedy Entertainment Performance | Katherine Ryan (8 Out of 10 Cats Does Countdown) | Daisy May Cooper (Taskmaster); Rosie Jones (Trip Hazard: My Great British Adventure); Sandi Toksvig (QI) |
| Outstanding Male Comedy Entertainment Performance | Sean Lock (8 Out of 10 Cats Does Countdown) | Mo Gilligan (The Lateish Show with Mo Gilligan); Mike Wozniak (Taskmaster); James Acaster (Hypothetical) |
| Best Scripted Comedy Series | Sex Education | Ghosts; Motherland; This Way Up |
| Outstanding Comedy Actress | Emma Mackey (Sex Education) | Charlotte Ritchie (Ghosts); Anjana Vasan (We Are Lady Parts); Aisling Bea (This Way Up) |
| Outstanding Comedy Actor | Asa Butterfield (Sex Education) | Greg Davies (The Cleaner); Lee Mack (Not Going Out); Mathew Baynton (Ghosts) |
| Outstanding Supporting Role | Ncuti Gatwa (Sex Education) | Aimee Lou Wood (Sex Education); Diane Morgan (Motherland); Lolly Adefope (Ghosts) |
| Best Stand Up Show | 'SuperNature' by Ricky Gervais | 'There's Mo to Life' by Mo Gilligan; 'Missus' by Katherine Ryan; 'Bobby Dazzler' by Sarah Millican; 'Like Me' by Jason Manford |
| Best Comedy Podcast | Shagged Married Annoyed | Off Menu with Ed Gamble and James Acaster; My Therapist Ghosted Me; Rob Beckett and Josh Widdicombe's Parenting Hell |
| Comedy Breakthrough Award | Munya Chawawa | Judi Love; Joanne McNally; Rose Matafeo; Rosie Jones |
| Caroline Aherne Writers Award | Sharon Horgan | |
| Victoria Wood Lifetime Achievement Award | Billy Connolly | |

==== 2023 ====
| Category | Winner | Nominations |
|---|---|---|
| Best Stand-Up show | Joe Lycett - ‘More, More, More! How Do You Lycett? How Do You Lycett?’ | Sam Campbell ‘Comedy Show’; Tim Key ‘Mulberry’; Amy Gledhill ‘The Girl Before The Girl You Marry’; Jordan Gray ‘Is It A Bird?’ |
| Best Comedy Entertainment Series | Taskmaster | Mortimer & Whitehouse: Gone Fishing; The Chris & Rosie Ramsey Show; The Graham Norton Show |
| Outstanding Female Comedy Entertainment Performance | Katherine Ryan (Backstage with Katherine Ryan) | Fern Brady (Taskmaster); Judi Love (Taskmaster); Sandi Toksvig (QI); Sarah Millican (Taskmaster) |
| Outstanding Male Comedy Entertainment Performance | Lee Mack (Would I Lie to You?) | Alex Horne (Taskmaster); Greg Davies (Taskmaster); Joe Lycett (Joe Lycett's Big Pride Party); Munya Chawawa (Taskmaster) |
| Best Scripted Comedy Series | After Life | Derry Girls; Don't Hug Me I'm Scared; Ghosts |
| Outstanding Comedy Actress | Saoirse-Monica Jackson (Derry Girls) | Charlotte Ritchie (Ghosts); Daisy May Cooper (Am I Being Unreasonable?); Rose Matafeo (Starstruck); Sharon Horgan (Bad Sisters) |
| Outstanding Comedy Actor | Ricky Gervais (After Life) | Dylan Llewellyn (Big Boys); Kiell Smith-Bynoe (Ghosts); Joe Gilgun (Brassic); Stephen Merchant (The Outlaws) |
| Outstanding Supporting Role | Diane Morgan (After Life) | David Earl (After Life); Jamie-Lee O'Donnell (Derry Girls); Lolly Adefope (Ghosts); Siobhán McSweeney (Derry Girls) |
| Best Comedy Podcast | Shagged Married Annoyed | Have A Word; Off Menu with Ed Gamble and James Acaster; Rob Beckett and Josh Widdicombe's Parenting Hell |
| Best Comedy Panel Show | 8 Out of 10 Cats Does Countdown | Mock the Week; QI; Would I Lie to You? |
| Comedy Breakthrough Award | Lenny Rush; Susan Wokoma; Jordan Gray | |
| Impact in Comedy | Mo Gilligan | |
| Comedy Gamechanger | Joe Lycett | |

== Controversies ==
=== Investigation of alleged irregularities and deception ===
At the 2005 ceremony, the wrong show received the People's Choice Award. The award was "mistakenly given" to Ant & Dec's Saturday Night Takeaway even though The Catherine Tate Show received the most tabulated votes and should have been declared the winner, and Ant & Dec were asked to return their 2005 award.

Charged by the awards show with investigating the allegations of irregularities, the independent law firm Olswang summarized its findings as follows: "Robbie Williams was invited to present an award. It was understood that he would be happy [to do so] if the recipients were Ant McPartlin and Declan Donnelly. In order to ensure his attendance, this assurance was given. But it could not be definitively established that Williams' involvement led to the wrong winner being announced" [italics added].

Saturday Night Takeaway did, however, receive the People's Choice Award at the British Comedy Awards 2006.

=== Phone-in scandal ===
Beginning on 26 July 2007, British tabloid newspapers reported the alleged involvement of the British Comedy Awards in the 2007 British television phone-in scandal. ITV announced that they postponed the British Comedy Awards 2007 due to the voting irregularities. In a statement, the company said: "Pending conclusion of the investigation, broadcast of the British Comedy Awards 2007 will be postponed. ... ITV will not make any further comment regarding this matter until the conclusion of the investigation."

It was announced on 21 September 2007 that the British Comedy Awards 2007 would not be screened by ITV1; however, it was not confirmed then that the Awards would still take place in December, and it was not ruled out that they could be screened by another channel. The 2007 awards did take place on 5 December 2007, but that show was not televised. In early May 2008 Ofcom announced its fining and sanctioning ITV plc in a press release.

On 15 August 2008, it was announced that a similar scandal could have been committed in the award ceremony at the 2005 Awards.

Following the Russell Brand Show prank calls row and his 12-week unpaid suspension from all of his BBC shows, Jonathan Ross resigned from presenting the 2008 awards, in agreement with ITV, as he did not want to "take away from the awards themselves or the many talented winners of the awards." Angus Deayton replaced Jonathan Ross as the host of the British Comedy Awards. Ross returned to presenting the awards in 2009.

== Ratings ==
Ratings from BARB.

| Airdate | Viewers (millions) | Overnight share |
|---|---|---|
| 12 December 1998 | 7.83 | |
| 18 December 1999 | 6.59 | |
| 16 December 2000 | 7.62 | |
| 15 December 2001 | 6.29 | |
| 14 December 2002 | 6.05 | |
| 10 December 2003 | 7.24 | |
| 22 December 2004 | 5.99 | |
| 14 December 2005 | 5.61 | |
| 13 December 2006 | 5.17 | |
| 6 December 2008 | 4.07 | |
| 12 December 2009 | 5.02 | |
| 22 January 2010 | 2.72 | |
| 16 December 2011 | 1.87 | |
| 12 December 2012 | 1.98 | |
| 12 December 2013 | 1.48 | |
| 17 December 2014 | 1.35 | |
| 5 March 2022 | | |

== See also ==
- British Comedy Guide
- Edinburgh Comedy Awards
- Comic's Choice
- Loaded Lafta Awards
