= Caroline Aherne =

English actress, comedian and writer (1963–2016)

- Aherne in 1999
- Born: Caroline Mary Aherne; 24 December 1963; Ealing, London, England
- Died: 2 July 2016 (aged 52); Timperley, Greater Manchester, England
- Education: Liverpool Polytechnic
- Occupations: Actress; comedian; writer; director; producer
- Years active: 1990–2016
- Notable work: The Fast Show (1994–2014); The Mrs Merton Show (1995–1998); The Royle Family (1998–2012); Gogglebox (2013–2016)
- Spouse: Peter Hook (m. 1994; div. 1997)

Caroline Mary Aherne (24 December 1963 – 2 July 2016) was an English actress, comedian, writer and director.

She was best known for performing as the acerbic chat show host Mrs Merton, in various roles in The Fast Show, and as Denise in The Royle Family (1998–2012), a series which she co-wrote. She won BAFTA awards for her work on The Mrs Merton Show and The Royle Family. Aherne narrated the Channel 4 reality television series Gogglebox from its inception in 2013 until 8 April 2016. She died of cancer at the age of 52.

== Early life ==
Caroline Mary Aherne was born in Ealing, London, on 24 December 1963, the second child of Irish parents Bartholomew Edmond "Bert" Aherne, a railwayman with London Transport, and Mary Frances "Maureen" Aherne (née Regan). From the age of two, Aherne was brought up in Wythenshawe, Manchester. Like her brother Patrick, Aherne had retinoblastoma in childhood, which left her partially sighted in one eye.

She attended the Hollies Convent FCJ School in West Didsbury, Xaverian College in Rusholme in Manchester and then studied drama at Liverpool Polytechnic.

== Career ==
=== Early career ===
Aherne began performing on the Manchester comedy circuit as characters such as Mitzi Goldberg, lead singer of the comedy country and western act the Mitzi Goldberg Experience, and Sister Mary Immaculate, an Irish nun.

Her first job was as a secretary at the BBC in Manchester. She gave a cassette of her work to the DJ Martin Kelner.

The Mrs Merton character originated as a voice on the 1988 Frank Sidebottom album titled 5:9:88, after Aherne worked as a receptionist for his show on Piccadilly Radio. Aherne was then invited by Kelner to develop the character on his show, where she would spend many years appearing as a comedy agony aunt across the north of England on the BBC Night Network.

In 1990 Aherne became a late-night radio presenter on KFM Radio in Stockport, joining a line-up which included Craig Cash as well as Jon Ronson, Spence MacDonnald and The Word's Terry Christian.

Aherne's first TV appearances were as Mrs Merton in a semi-regular spot on the Granada TV discussion show Upfront in 1990. After that Mrs Merton became the regular celebrity interviewer on Granada's Saturday morning show Express!, a youth TV programme presented by I Am Kloot's John 'Johnny Dangerously' Bramwell and Sumy Kuraishe from a number of random locations in the north west. In 1992 Aherne appeared as Mrs Merton in the local Yorkshire Television series Frank's Fantastic Shed Show, with Chris Sievey in his Frank Sidebottom persona. For this Leeds-based ITV station Aherne had recorded a pilot of Mrs Murton's Nightcap, but they had not pursued the concept. In 1993, she made brief appearances in The Smell of Reeves and Mortimer and alongside Steve Coogan and John Thomson in a Granada TV pilot entitled The Dead Good Show.

From 9 April 1991 she appeared on the Radio 5 comedy series on Tuesdays at 12.30pm called 'Where Were You in...?', which featured mostly Manchester comedians. She appeared on BBC1 on 3 August 1991 on the late-night Saturday programme 'Paramount City', also with Simon Day. From 20 November 1993 she appeared on ITV's late-night Saturday programme 'Raw Soup'.

=== Mrs Merton ===
She rose to prominence in 1994 as her created character Mrs Merton on the mock chat show The Mrs Merton Show under her married name of Caroline Hook. The guests were real-life celebrities, not actors, who found themselves the subject of outrageous faux-naïf questions – in one memorable example the wife of magician Paul Daniels, Debbie McGee, was asked "So, what first attracted you to the millionaire Paul Daniels?" – while a regular audience of pensioners were used each week for Mrs Merton to bounce questions off.

Another episode featured comedian Bernard Manning and actor Richard Wilson. Manning clashed with Wilson and Aherne as she asked him about his racist attitudes, at one point saying, "Who do you vote for now Hitler's dead?" – although he acknowledged that One Foot in the Grave was funny. The series ran in various formats from 1994 to 1997, winning a BAFTA for Best Talk Show in 1997. The success of the show was partly attributed to the "round vowel sounds of the North West accent" which "naturally sound safe and unthreatening" and which allowed the character "to ask the most outrageous, below-the-belt questions of her guest stars".

The Mrs Merton character was given a sitcom, Mrs Merton and Malcolm, which depicted her home life with her "mummy's boy" son (played by co-writer Craig Cash). This aspect of Malcolm's character was exaggerated to the point that many complained the series ridiculed those with learning difficulties. Mrs Merton and Malcolm lasted one series, and was released on DVD in 2008.

=== The Fast Show ===
She joined The Fast Show in January 1994, when the series had not been given a title. Filming would begin in March 1994. The first broadcast was on Tuesday 27 September 1994.

Between 1994 and 2004 she appeared alongside Paul Whitehouse and Charlie Higson in The Fast Show, where her characters included "Our Janine", a teenage mum with a unique world outlook; Renée, the endlessly chattering Northern wife of hen-pecked Roy; Checkout Girl, a simple and chatty young supermarket employee; and Chanel 9 meteorologist Poula Fisch, whose weather forecasts invariably included the word "Scorchio!"

=== The Royle Family ===
Aherne's most popular creation is the situation comedy The Royle Family, which she co-created and wrote with Cash, and directed in its third series. The series was being written by August 1996, to start production in 1997.

The programme ran for three series from 1998 to 2000. Aherne starred alongside Ricky Tomlinson and Sue Johnston, as their daughter Denise Royle. The show was a commercial and critical success, and ran for three series with a total of 20 episodes as well as five one-offs made for showing at Christmas. After a 2000 spoof documentary with Cash entitled Back Passage to India, Aherne said The Royle Family would end in December 2000 after a Christmas special, and that she would not appear on television again, although she would continue to write. Aherne received BAFTAs for Best Sitcom in 2000 and 2007, and she won the BAFTA for Best Comedy Performance in 2000. She was nominated for directing in 2001. She also played Denise Best in the TV special The Comedy Trail: A Shaggy Dog Story.

=== Later career ===
Following a disagreement with Cash, Aherne moved to Australia and retreated from the press. She wrote Dossa and Joe which was screened on BBC Two in 2002. Although critics applauded it, the show failed to attract viewers and did not return for a second series. Returning to Britain, she began work on another sitcom with Cash, but pulled out, after which Cash wrote Early Doors with Phil Mealey; Aherne was listed in the credits in the "Thanks To" section.

After Dossa and Joe, Aherne avoided media attention. When The Fast Show was featured on the BBC One show Comedy Connections, Aherne was the only cast member not interviewed. In April 2006, the BBC said Aherne and Cash were developing a script for a one-off special of The Royle Family. The Royle Family: The Queen of Sheba was broadcast on 29 October 2006, to an audience of 7.8 million. Aherne subsequently made few TV appearances. On 14 October 2008, she appeared in the BBC comedy drama Sunshine, written by Cash and Phil Mealey, as a barmaid. She appeared in The Royle Family special "The New Sofa" on Christmas Day 2008. In 2009, she appeared in another special for Comic Relief, as well as another Christmas Day special entitled "The Golden Eggcup".

She co-wrote the ITV comedy-drama The Fattest Man in Britain, which was broadcast in December 2009. In November 2010, Aherne appeared in the special The Royle Family: Behind the Sofa shown on Gold, featuring clips of The Royle Family and interviews with Aherne, Cash and the cast, which was followed by another Christmas Day special, "Joe's Crackers". She narrated a BBC1 documentary series Pound Shop Wars broadcast in November 2012. She also appeared in The Fast Show internet specials, sponsored by the lager brand Fosters, which reunited most of the original principal cast; only Mark Williams was unable to participate.

Aherne wrote the 2013 one-off sitcom The Security Men, along with Jeff Pope for ITV. The episode starred Paddy McGuinness, Brendan O'Carroll, Dean Andrews, Bobby Ball and Peter Wight.

Aherne's final major role was as narrator of the Channel 4 comedy reality series Gogglebox, reflecting her character in The Royle Family, who would frequently be watching TV and commenting on it. Cash filled in when she was unavailable and took over the role permanently in April 2016.

Aherne's final on-screen appearance came in the Sky One show After Hours, where she was reunited with Cash who produced and directed the show. She played the role of Sheila.

== Personal life ==
In January 1994, Aherne met musician Peter Hook at the Hacienda, after filming at Granada. They married in Las Vegas on 23 July. By July 1996 they had separated, and divorced in 1997. During their marriage, he appeared in her TV series The Mrs Merton Show as leader of Hooky & the Boys, the show's house band. After Aherne's death, Hook said that their marriage was turbulent and that she had once attempted to stab him with a kitchen knife.

By September 1996 she had met 27-year old Matt Bowers, a TV producer from Watford, who had been at Granada from August 1996. They lived together in Didsbury. Their relationship ended by January 1997; by mid-February, Bowers was hospitalised with stomach cancer at Watford General Hospital, having had months of stomach pains. He died on 9 April 1997.

Aherne struggled with depression and alcoholism. She attempted suicide in July 1998 after Bowers' death and the end of her relationship with the actor Alexis Denisof. She checked in to the Priory, where she was diagnosed as a binge alcoholic. She had suffered from bladder cancer and had been born with a rare cancer of the retina. In 2014, she also embarked on a programme of treatment for lung cancer. In June 2014, Aherne appeared in Manchester at the launch of the Macmillan Cancer Improvement Partnership (MCIP), a £3.4 million scheme to co-ordinate cancer care in the city. She spoke about how a sense of humour had helped her cope with the disease. In 2016, Aherne became the voice behind the UK government's "One You" health campaign, to persuade people to cut down on cigarettes and alcohol.

On the morning of 2 July 2016, Aherne died of lung cancer at her home in Timperley aged 52. Aherne had told family and close friends in May that she was terminally ill. Her funeral took place on 14 July 2016. Many friends and co-stars were in attendance.

In October 2016, Steve Coogan paid tribute to Aherne at the Stand Up to Cancer 2016 event, speaking about her before a video was played of her TV moments, and then Noel Gallagher's High Flying Birds performed The Royle Family theme tune "Half the World Away". As part of the Oasis Live '25 Tour, during their performance in Heaton Park, Gallagher dedicated the song once again to Aherne and Cash.

== Filmography ==
Year	Title	Actor	Writer	Acting role	Additional information
1992	Frank Sidebottom's Fantastic Shed Show	Yes	No	Mrs Merton	3 episodes
1992	The Dead Good Show	Yes	Yes	Various characters	Unknown episode(s)
1993	It's a Mad World, World, World, World	Yes	No	Various characters	TV special
1993	Comic Timing	Yes	Yes	Mrs Merton	1 episode
1994–2014	The Fast Show	Yes	Yes	Various characters	25 episodes (acting); 10 episodes (writing)
1995	The World of Lee Evans	Yes	No	Daughter	1 episode
1995	The Smell of Reeves and Mortimer	Yes	No	Woman with Dog / Flatulent Mother	2 episodes
1995–1998	The Mrs Merton Show	Yes	Yes	Mrs Merton	Leading role – 4 series (29 episodes)
1996	Auntie's All-Time Greats	Yes	No	Mrs Merton	TV special
1998–2000, 2006–2012	The Royle Family	Yes	Yes	Denise Royle	Leading role – 3 series & 7 specials (25 episodes); 11 episodes (director); 8 episodes (associate producer)
1999	Mrs Merton and Malcolm	Yes	Yes	Mrs Merton	1 series (6 episodes); Additionally served as associate producer
2002	Dossa and Joe	No	Yes	—N/a	Director & executive producer (6 episodes)
2008	Sunshine	Yes	No	Donna	Miniseries (episode 2)
2009	The Fattest Man in Britain	No	Yes	—N/a	Television film
2013	The Security Men	No	Yes	—N/a	Television drama – executive producer
2013–2014	Strange Hill High	Yes	No	Stephanie	2 series (26 episodes); Additional voice roles
2015	After Hours	Yes	No	Sheila	2 episodes

== Awards ==
Year	Award	Category	Work	Result	Ref.
1997	BAFTA Awards	Best Talk Show	The Mrs Merton Show	Won	
1997	British Comedy Awards	Best BBC1 Personality	The Mrs Merton Show	Won	
1997	British Comedy Awards	Best Female Comedy Performer	The Mrs Merton Show	Won	
1997	TRIC Awards	New TV Talent of the Year	The Mrs Merton Show	Won	
1999	BAFTA Awards	Best Comedy Series	The Royle Family	Nominated	
1999	BAFTA Awards	Best Comedy Performance	The Royle Family	Nominated	
1999	British Comedy Awards	Best TV Comedy Actress	The Royle Family and Mrs Merton and Malcolm	Won	
1999	Broadcasting Press Guild Awards	Writer's Award	The Royle Family	Won	
2000	BAFTA Awards	Best Comedy Performance	The Royle Family	Won	
2000	BAFTA Awards	Best Situation Comedy	The Royle Family	Won	
2000	Royal Television Society Awards	Best Sitcom	The Royle Family	Nominated	
2000	Royal Television Society Awards	Best Writer	The Royle Family	Won	
2001	TRIC Awards	Comedy Programme	The Royle Family	Won	
2001	BAFTA Awards	Best Comedy Performance	The Royle Family	Nominated	
2001	BAFTA Awards	Best Situation Comedy	The Royle Family	Nominated	
2007	BAFTA Awards	Best Situation Comedy	The Royle Family: "Queen of Sheba"	Won	
2007	Royal Television Society Awards	Best Comedy Writer	The Royle Family: "Queen of Sheba"	Won	
