= Henry Normal =

British comedian

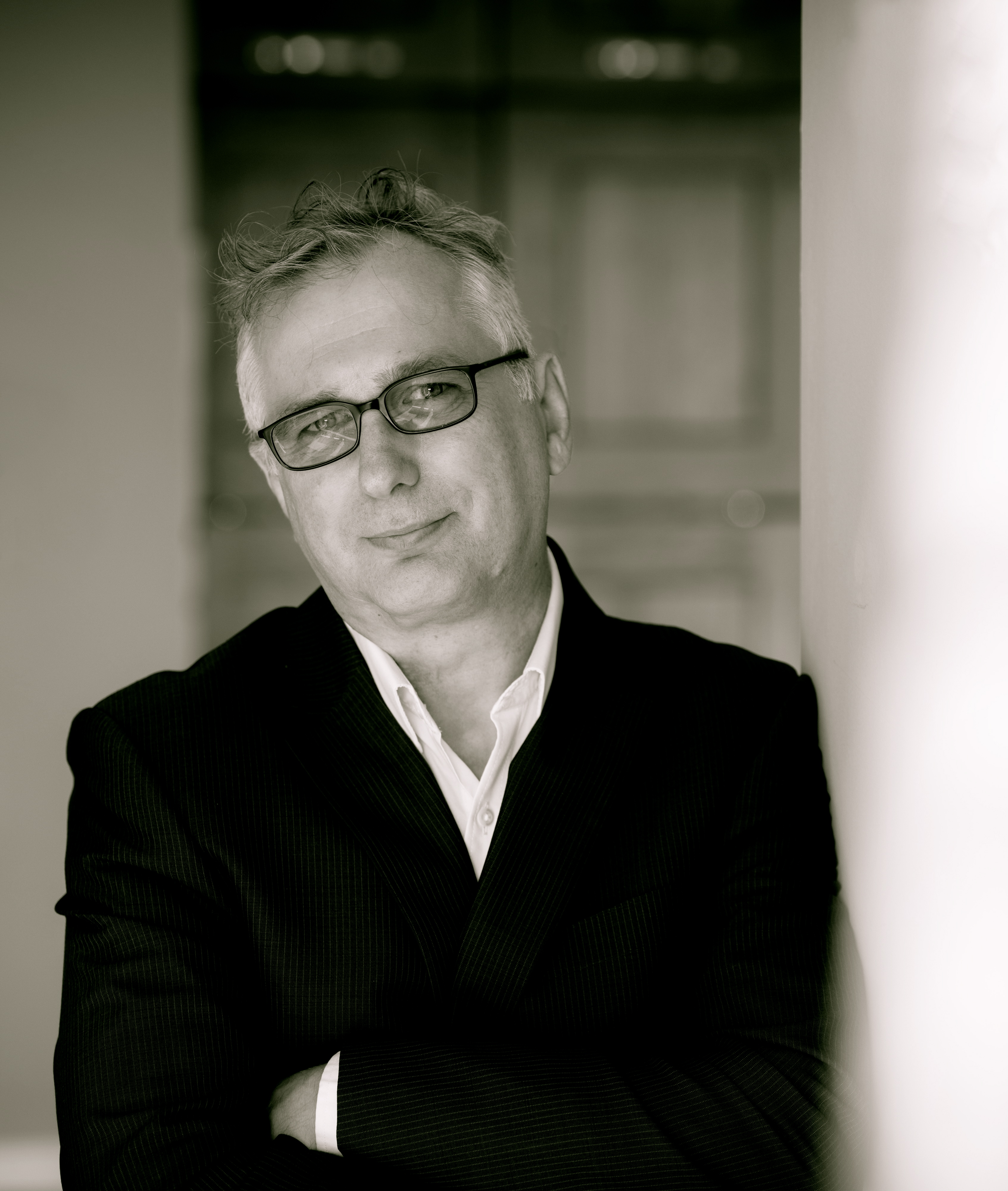
- Born: Peter James Carroll; 15 August 1956 (age 70); Nottingham, England

Comedy career
- Years active: 1980s–present
- Medium: Comedian, television producer, poet, writer
- Website: henrynormal.com

Henry Normal (born Peter James Carroll, 15 August 1956) is an English writer, poet, film and TV producer, founder of the Manchester Poetry Festival (now the Manchester Literature Festival), and co-founder of the Nottingham Poetry Festival. In June 2017, he was honoured with a special BAFTA for services to television. He set up Baby Cow Productions with Steve Coogan in 1999, and was its managing director until his retirement in 2016.

== Early life ==
Normal was born in St. Ann's, Nottingham where he attended William Sharp school (now named Nottingham University Samworth Academy). It was there that his teacher encouraged him to look for poetry in the lyrics of Bob Dylan and John Lennon. He started to write poetry and published his first book of poems entitled Is Love Science Fiction? (Mushroom Books, 1975) when he was nineteen.

== Career ==
Whilst living in Chesterfield, Normal chanced upon a local fanzine writer and knocked on the bedsit door of editor Faye Ray. The fanzine editor played Normal tapes of 'ranting' poets he had recently received including Steven 'Seething' Wells, Little Brother and Joolz Denby. Normal went on to be a central figure in the local music scene and the performance poet was a regular fixture at local gigs.

=== On the road ===
Early in his career Normal toured with the band Pulp. With Mark Atwood he helped form the Live Poets Society, whose motto was "poetry so good you can actually understand it". Established in Manchester, they performed in pubs and clubs throughout the north of England. Normal had an eccentric delivery style, and at a 1987 poetry convention in Corby performed with a paper bag over his head. Also in the 1980s, Normal had short prose pieces published in small press magazines such as "Peace & Freedom magazine". He released a live album, Ostrich Man, in 1987.

=== Television ===
In 1991 he starred in Channel 4's late night series Packet of Three, which blended stand-up comedy with a peculiarly solipsistic sitcom about the staff working at a variety theatre called the Crumpsall Palladium. As the beleaguered, depressed theatre owner, Normal was assisted by stage manager Frank Skinner and kiosk attendant Jenny Eclair.

He co-wrote and script-edited the multi-award-winning Mrs Merton Show and the spin-off series Mrs Merton and Malcolm. He also co-created and co-wrote the first series of The Royle Family with Caroline Aherne and Craig Cash. With Steve Coogan, he co-wrote the BAFTA-winning Paul and Pauline Calf Video Diaries, Coogan's Run, Tony Ferrino, Dr. Terrible's House of Horrible, all of Coogan's live tours, and the film The Parole Officer.

=== Productions ===
Setting up Baby Cow Productions in 1999, Normal executive-produced all, and script-edited many, of the shows of its seventeen-and-a-half-year output during his tenure as MD. Highlights of the Baby Cow output during this time include Oscar-nominated Philomena, Gavin and Stacey, I Believe in Miracles, Moone Boy, Uncle, Red Dwarf, The Mighty Boosh, Marion and Geoff, Nighty Night, Camping, Hunderby and Alan Partridge.

=== Radio ===
In 1994, Normal performed a series of four shows called Encyclopedia Poetica on BBC Radio 4. Since retiring in April 2016, Normal has written and performed twelve Radio 4 shows combining comedy, poetry and stories about his life and family: A Normal Family, A Normal Life, A Normal Love, A Normal Imagination, A Normal Nature, A Normal Universe, A Normal Communication, A Normal Ageing, A Normal Community, A Normal Home, A Normal Journey and A Normal Humanity. Both series of shows have since been repeated on BBC Radio 4 Extra.

== Publications ==
In 2018, Two Roads published A Normal Family: Everyday adventures with our autistic son, which he co-wrote with his wife, screenwriter Angela Pell.

Normal has several poetry collections published by Flapjack Press:

- Travelling Second Class Through Hope (2017)
- Raining Upwards (2017)
- Staring Directly at the Eclipse (2018 – originally published by Five Leaves in 2016).
- This Phantom Breath (2018)
- The Department of Lost Wishes (2018)
- Swallowing the Entire Ocean (2019)
- Strikingly Invisible (2019)
- The Escape Plan (2020)
- The Beauty Within Shadow (2020)
- The Distance Between Clouds (2021)
- Collected Poems, Volume One (2021)
- Collected Poems, Volume Two (2022)
- The Fire Hills (2023)
- Collected Poems, Volume Three (2023)
- A Moonless Night (2024)
- An Alphabet of Storms (2025)
- The First Spark Has Led to This Blaze (w/ Pete Ramskill, 2025)
- A Quiet Promise (2026)
- Collected Poems, Volume Four (2026)

== Personal life ==
Normal lives in East Sussex with his wife, the screenwriter Angela Pell, and their son, Johnny.

== Awards ==
Normal has been awarded honorary degrees by both the University of Nottingham and Nottingham Trent University. He is a Patron of Nottingham UNESCO City of Literature.
