= Phil Mealey =

British actor and writer from Stockport

Phil Mealey is a British actor and writer from Stockport.

== Biography ==
Mealey co-wrote and associate-produced the BBC sitcom Early Doors with Craig Cash. Mealey also acted in the series, playing the character Duffy. Cash and Mealey won two North West Comedy Awards in 2005 for the writing and acting on the series.

Mealey also co-wrote some episodes of the BBC's sitcom series The Royle Family, along with Cash and Caroline Aherne.

He appeared in Sunshine which he also co-wrote with Cash. More recently, however, he has been featured in a supporting role in the American-British sitcom Laff Riot, in which he plays Michael Gleave, a hyperactive, unruly acting colleague of Callum Rose.
