= Anna Lee (TV series) =

UK television series

- Title card from the episode 'Dupe', with Imogen Stubbs
- Genre: Crime drama
- Written by: Anthony Horowitz; Clive Exton; Douglas Watkinson
- Directed by: Christopher King; Peter Barber-Fleming
- Starring: Imogen Stubbs; John Rowe; Peter Wight; Brian Glover; Wil Johnson; Sonia Graham; Ceri Jackson
- Theme music composer: Luciana Caporaso
- Composers: Richard Hartley; Anne Dudley
- Country of origin: United Kingdom
- Original language: English
- No. of series: 1
- No. of episodes: 6

Production
- Executive producers: Nick Elliott; Sarah Wilson
- Producers: Sue Britwistle; Brian Eastman
- Cinematography: Nic Morris; Giles Nuttgens
- Editors: Derek Bain; Neil Thompson
- Running time: 100 minutes
- Production companies: Carnival Films; LWT

Original release
- Network: ITV
- Release: 10 January 1993 – 27 March 1994

Anna Lee is a British television crime drama series, first broadcast on 10 January 1993, that ran for a total of six episodes on ITV. The series, loosely based on the detective novels of Liza Cody, starred Imogen Stubbs as the title character, alongside Brian Glover, John Rowe, Peter Wight and Wil Johnson. The series was produced by Brian Eastman, in conjunction with Carnival Films for LWT.

Following a single pilot episode, broadcast in 1993, London Weekend Television commissioned a full-length five-episode series, to be filmed later that year for broadcast in 1994. All six episodes were later broadcast in the United States on the A&E cable network.

The series had a mostly different cast from the pilot, apart from Stubbs and Glover. Despite much detail being removed for the television adaptations, one of LWT's contributions to the series was the casting of Brian Glover; like his character Selwyn Price, Glover was an ex-professional wrestler, and his room full of wrestling posters seen in the series were in fact real posters featuring Leon Arras, the name Glover used when wrestling.

Music for the series was provided by Anne Dudley, while the theme tune, "Sister, Sister", was performed by Luciana, who also appeared in the final episode.

Despite all six episodes being adapted from their source books, considerable alterations were made for television, much to the dismay of writer Liza Cody. Reportedly, this prompted Cody to abandon writing any further Anna Lee books; as she had previously signed a contract with LWT to allow for any further books to be adapted for television.

== Cast ==
- Imogen Stubbs as Anna Lee; a former policewoman now working as a private detective
- Brian Glover as Selwyn Price; an ex-wrestler who lives in Anna's apartment building
- Michael Bryant/John Rowe as Commander Martin Brierly; Anna's boss
- Ken Stott/Peter Wight as Bernie Schiller; a fellow detective
- David Harewood/Wil Johnson as Stevie Johnson; another fellow detective
- Barbara Leigh-Hunt/Sonia Graham as Beryl Doyle; Commander Brierly's secretary
- Ceri Jackson as Ros Russell; a former police colleague, who is still on the force

== Episodes ==
=== Pilot (1993) ===
No.	Title	Directed by	Written by	British air date
1	"Headcase"	Colin Bucksey	Andrew Davies	10 January 1993
Anna Lee's first assignment at her new job in a private security firm, Brierly Detective Agency, is to find a missing girl, Thea Hahn. A gifted sixteen-year-old, she has been attending a tutorial college in Bloomsbury, prior to going up to Cambridge University. Anna looks up one of Thea's tutors, John Tulloch, only to be told by his young son Sam that his father is dead. Back at her flat, Anna's on-off boyfriend Quex has re-appeared. Guest starring: Alan Howard, Kate Beckinsale, Shirley Anne Field and Eoin McCarthy

=== Series 1 (1994) ===
No.	Title	Directed by	Written by	British air date
1	"Dupe"	Christopher King	Anthony Horowitz	27 February 1994
Brierly Security is engaged by a Mr and Mrs Jackson to find their missing daughter, Deirdre. Anna tracks down the girl's ex-boyfriend Simon, who leads her to the wedding video company where Deirdre ("Dee") works. Anna meets Dee who seems self-assured and has no desire to meet her parents. Dee is next found dead in her car. Mr Jackson cannot agree with the police that the cause of death was an accident. Anna believes Dee's former boss Fred Slinger may hold the key to the mystery. Guest starring: Anthony Newley, Eddie O'Connell, Tony Vogel, Walter Sparrow and Roger Martin
2	"Stalker"	Peter Barber-Fleming	Douglas Watkinson	6 March 1994
A mysterious figure on a motorbike is searching for a man called Eddie Marsham. A man called Thurman commissions Brierly Security also to find Marsham. While Anna searches for Marsham, she is followed by Kilshaw. Meanwhile, Anna develops a relationship with Peter, a vet who is separated from his wife. Guest starring: Peter Firth, Michael Attwell, Jacquetta May, Eve Bland and Roger Martin
3	"Diversion"	Christopher King	Anthony Horowitz	13 March 1994
The Notting Hill Carnival Committee receive notes threatening violence unless the Carnival is cancelled. There is speculation that the man behind the threats is Adrian Wesley, a prominent businessman. Wesley is campaigning for the running of the Carnival to be taken out of the hands of the "do-gooders" and given to his marketing company. He also suspects his wife is having an affair and he wants proof. Two days before the event, a bomb explodes. No one is hurt, but the Carnival route has to be changed to avoid the damaged street. Meanwhile, Beryl is kidnapped. Guest starring: John Bird, Jack Shute, Mary Conlon, Jaye Griffiths and Tenniel Evans
4	"The Cook's Tale"	Christopher King	Clive Exton	20 March 1994
Anna is hired by an old friend, Laura Jones. Anna has to identify the woman who is having an affair with Laura's husband, Dominic Jones. Dominic is a top chef who jointly owns a restaurant with Laura's father. Anna traces the woman – an actress called Mary Vincent. Mary is also the mistress of Laura's father, David Lambert. Guest starring: Adrian Edmondson, Sara Stewart, Ann Bell, Robert Lang and Clive Francis
5	"Requiem"	Peter Barber-Fleming	Anthony Horowitz	27 March 1994
Dawn Blake, a young pop singer, is found dead. A man called Mike Trevor asks Brierly's to investigate. He claims Dawn's death was not suicide, but murder. He says the man responsible is William Gilmore, the owner of Wreck Records, Dawn's label. Anna initially finds circumstantial evidence to support Trevor's theory. However, the more she knows of Gilmore, the more she likes him. Bernie and Stevie find evidence that seems strongly to implicate Gilmore but Anna refuses to believe it. Brierly accuses her of letting her emotions cloud her judgement and, after a furious row, she resigns. Guest starring: Jesse Birdsall, Greg Proops, Michael Grandage and Luciana Caporaso
