= Mary Killen =

Etiquette expert

- Born: 1951 (age 74–75); Larne, Northern Ireland
- Writing career
- Genre: Non-fiction
- Subject: Advice

Mary Killen is a Northern Irish etiquette expert who writes an "agony" column for The Spectator. She is also the author of several books, and formerly worked in the Ministry of Defence. Mary was brought up in Larne, Northern Ireland. She attended Larne Grammar School from September 1963 until June 1970. Killen lives in Wiltshire, England, and is married to artist Giles Wood. They met when Giles was studying at Wimbledon Art School, and Mary was a model. Mary was the face of Heinz Soup in a 1970s advertisement campaign Mary and Giles have two children.

Killen contracted legionnaires' disease in 1999.

The couple have been regular participants on the television programme Gogglebox since Series 5 in 2015.

Mary and Giles often address each other as 'nutty'.

== Works ==
- Best Behaviour: The Tatler Book of Alternative Etiquette (1990) by Mary Killen
- Dear Mary: The Spectator Book of Solutions (1993) by Mary Killen
- How to live with your husband (1996) by Mary Killen
- Dear Mary... your social dilemmas resolved (1997) by Mary Killen
- How the Queen Can Make You Happy (2012) by Mary Killen
- The Diary of Two Nobodies (2017) by Giles Wood and Mary Killen
- What Would HM The Queen Do? (2020) by Mary Killen
- Country Life: A Story of Peaks and Troughs (2024) by Giles Wood and Mary Killen
