= The Security Men =

- Genre: Comedy
- Developed by: Bryan Fuller
- Written by: Caroline Aherne; Jeff Pope
- Directed by: David Drury
- Starring: Dean Andrews; Bobby Ball; Ben-Ryan Davies; Denice Hope; Archie Kelly; Paddy McGuinness; Brendan O'Carroll; Peter Wight
- Country of origin: United Kingdom
- Original language: English

Production
- Producer: Saurabh Kakkar
- Production location: Salford Shopping Centre
- Camera setup: Single-camera
- Running time: 60 minutes
- Production company: ITV Studios

Original release
- Network: ITV
- Release: 12 April 2013

The Security Men is a British television comedy pilot, written by BAFTA-award-winning comedian Caroline Aherne and Jeff Pope, that first broadcast on ITV on 12 April 2013. The pilot, written as a precursor to a planned four-part series, follows a group of night security guards working at the fictional Whittington shopping centre in Greater Manchester, who create an elaborate scheme to hide a robbery that has taken place on their watch. The pilot, which was filmed in 2011, remained shelved whilst writing on a planned four-part series, which promised to "follow the characters home to meet their friends and families", was written. Although the series did not materialise, for reasons undisclosed, the pilot was finally broadcast in 2013 as part of ITV's new "primetime comedy" season.

Produced by ITV Studios, the pilot starred Brendan O'Carroll, Bobby Ball, Dean Andrews and Peter Wight as "security men" Jimmy, Duckers, Ray and Kenneth. Archie Kelly and Paddy McGuinness also starred as police constables Clarke and Greaves. The pilot received an advance broadcast in Northern Ireland, being shown on 5 April 2011 prior to the broadcast of a new documentary series on RTÉ following the lives of real life "security men". The pilot was critically panned, with The Telegraph stating that it was "unfunny" and "full of rancid sexism."

== Cast ==
- Brendan O'Carroll as Jimmy
- Bobby Ball as Duckers
- Dean Andrews as Ray
- Peter Wight as Kenneth
- Paddy McGuinness as PC Clarke
- Archie Kelly as PC Greaves
- Ben-Ryan Davies as Rhys
- Denice Hope as Eunice
- John Rawling as the Boxing Commentator
