= Roger Martin (actor) =

British actor and theatre director (1952–2026)

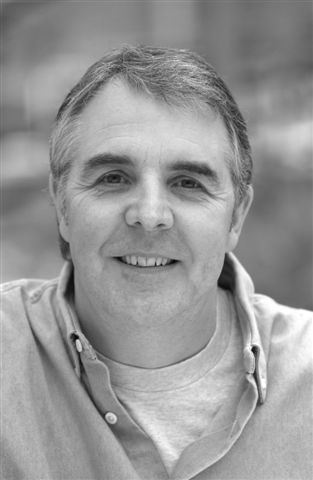
Martin in 2006

Roger Martin (1 July 1952 – 14 July 2026) was a British actor and theatre director whose acting career spanned four decades, during which time he appeared in the theatre and films, while his television roles included sitcoms and dramas. Martin was also the artistic director of Fresh Look Theatre and chairman of the Eastside Educational Trust.

== Early years ==
Martin was born in Burslem in Stoke-on-Trent in 1952. His father was a physics teacher, and his mother a telephonist. His maternal grandfather was a specialist gentleman’s outfitter, the sign above his shop announcing him as a ‘Hatter and Hosier’. Martin's paternal grandfather worked in the pottery industry initially and ended his working life as a rent collector for the local council.

He attended Wolstanton County Grammar School, where his interest in drama was first awakened when he took leading roles in school plays for eight consecutive years under the direction of his English master, Gordon Renshaw. He also acted in Gilbert and Sullivan productions under his music master, John Fenna. During the late 1960s and early 1970s he was the bass guitarist and vocalist in a band called 'Gollum' which played in and around the potteries.

Martin trained as an actor at the Guildhall School of Music and Drama, and made his professional debut in his home town of Stoke-on-Trent, acting from 1974 to 1976 with the Victoria Theatre Company under its founder and artistic director Peter Cheeseman.

== Acting career ==
Martin's first television appearances were in children's programmes, including Watch and Play Away, later making his prime-time television debut in an episode of Potter (1980) which starred Arthur Lowe. He went on to appear in Holding the Fort (1980), a BBC production of The Merchant of Venice (1980), The Professionals (1980), Yes Minister (1981), The Setbacks (1981), Angels (1982), and In Sickness and in Health (1985). He played Alan Medford in seven episodes of Terry and June between 1980 and 1987.

Further television appearances included Roger Duff in the final series of No Place Like Home (1987), Bread (1991), Anglo-Saxon Attitudes (1992), Minder (1993), Resnick: Rough Treatment (1993), Anna Lee (1994), Shine on Harvey Moon (1995), Call Red (1996), Jack and Jeremy's Real Lives (1996), Does China Exist? (1997), The Jump (1998), EastEnders (1999), Midsomer Murders (2002), My Dad's the Prime Minister (2003), The Brief (2004), 55 Degrees North (2004), Judge John Deed (2005), Casualty (2007), Doctors (2006–2009), and Trial & Retribution (2008).

His film appearances included O Lucky Man! (1973) and Britannia Hospital (1982).

Martin's theatre acting included appearances at over 20 repertory theatres including Bristol and Leeds. With the Royal Shakespeare Company he acted in Wild Oats (1977) and As You Like It (1978). He appeared in the 1986 revival of Charlie Girl. From 2010 to 2012 he appeared in Dreamboats and Petticoats at the Playhouse Theatre in London's West End.

A theatre director with over 20 years experience, Martin was the artistic director of Fresh Look Theatre. His directing credits included Clive Barker’s The Secret Life of Cartoons, Three Men on the Bummel, Shakespeare – The Good Beer Guide, performed at the Edinburgh Fringe Festival, Duet for One at the Lyric Theatre in Hammersmith, Songs from the Head (a song-cycle for which he wrote both the music and lyrics) at the Redgrave Theatre in Farnham; and Raspberry and Scrooge for the London Fringe Festival. He was Assistant Director to Ronald Eyre on A Patriot for Me at the Theatre Royal Haymarket and the Ahmanson Theatre in Los Angeles. He directed The Watcher at the Edinburgh Fringe which was revived at the Waterloo East Theatre in 2011.

Martin's interests included supporting Stoke City F.C. (he had a collection of match programmes dating back to 1904), watching sports, playing cricket, and playing piano and guitar for both personal enjoyment and occasionally professionally. He also held an advanced driving test certificate.

He was the Chairman of the Eastside Educational Trust, an award-winning children's arts education trust from 1999.

In June 2019, Martin made an appearance on the BBC daytime soap opera Doctors. He portrayed the role of Bob Kennedy for one episode.

== Death ==
Martin died on 14 July 2026.
