= Case Sensitive (TV series) =

- Genre: Crime drama
- Created by: Sophie Hannah
- Starring: Olivia Williams; Darren Boyd; Peter Wight; Ralph Ineson; Christina Chong
- Country of origin: United Kingdom
- Original language: English
- No. of series: 2
- No. of episodes: 4 (list of episodes)

Production
- Running time: 60 mins. (with advertisements)
- Production company: Hat Trick Productions

Original release
- Network: ITV
- Release: 2 May 2011 – 13 July 2012

Case Sensitive is a British crime drama series broadcast on ITV, based on the best-selling books by Sophie Hannah. Two series of the programme, starring Olivia Williams and Darren Boyd, have been produced, adapting the novels The Point of Rescue and The Other Half Lives. The first episode was broadcast on 2 May 2011. Both series were issued on DVD on 16 July 2012.

== Plot ==
The first series focuses on DS Charlie Zailer (Olivia Williams) and DC Simon Waterhouse (Darren Boyd) as they investigate the double murder of a mother and her five-year-old child. This series was based on the novel The Point of Rescue. Guest stars in this series include Rupert Graves, Amy Beth Hayes and Christina Chong. Episode one drew a strong overnight viewing audience of 5.4 million viewers.

Series two involves the team investigating a murder linked to a man who recently admitted to abusing a former girlfriend. This series was based on the novel The Other Half Lives. The main cast of Williams, Boyd, Wight and Ineson all returned for this series. Viewing figures were once again strong, drawing a similar audience to series one.

== Cast ==
- Olivia Williams as DS Charlie Zailer
- Darren Boyd as DC Simon Waterhouse
- Peter Wight as DI Robbie Proust
- Ralph Ineson as DC Colin Sellers
- Christina Chong as DC Amber Williams

== Episode list ==
=== Series 1 (2011) ===
| No. | Title | Directed by | Written by | Original release date | Viewers (millions) |
|---|---|---|---|---|---|
| 1 | "The Point of Rescue: Part 1" | Charles Martin | Kate Brooke | 2 May 2011 | 6.00 |
Zailer and Waterhouse investigate when housewife Geraldine Bretherick and her young daughter are found dead. The early view is that Geraldine killed them both, an opinion endorsed by criminologists Harbord and Hey - but her husband Mark, away on business at the time, claims she was perfectly happy and would never have taken her own life.
| 2 | "The Point of Rescue: Part 2" | Charles Martin | Sheelagh Stevenson | 3 May 2011 | 4.64 |
Sally finds herself locked in a house with the man who told her he was Mark Bretherick - but he later breaks the revelation that Mark is out to kill her. Meanwhile, the real Mark is shown a picture of Sally, and he informs Zailer and Waterhouse that this was the woman who claimed to be Esther Taylor.

=== Series 2 (2012) ===
| No. | Title | Directed by | Written by | Original release date | Viewers (millions) |
|---|---|---|---|---|---|
| 1 | "The Other Half Lives: Part 1" | John Strickland | Sarah Williams | 12 July 2012 | 4.42 |
Ruth Blacksmith and her husband, Jason, teachers at the same school, seemed happily married -- and then Ruth fell for a new teacher at the school, Aidan Harper. Aidan proposes and Ruth accepts, despite his telling her that he once hurt someone (subsequently revealed to be a woman called Mary Trelease), who later died. However, Ruth doesn't know that Jason and Aidan had a physical fight a few weeks earlier -- and when Jason is found murdered, Aidan, who has no alibi, becomes a suspect.
| 2 | "The Other Half Lives: Part 2" | John Strickland | Sarah Williams | 13 July 2012 | 4.01 |
Ruth has been arrested for Jason's murder. Zailer tells her that police know Ruth was in Jason's house on the day he died, prompting Ruth to admit that they had sex -- but she claims that he was alive when she left. Later, when releasing Ruth on bail, Zailer tells her that she has been to see Aidan and has told him about Ruth and Jason, and that Aidan has told police that the woman Ruth saw him with is his stepsister, Mary Trelease. As the investigation continues, Ruth and Aidan question whether they really know each other and wonder what other secrets await discovery.
