= Mrs Merton and Malcolm =

British television sitcom (1999)

- Genre: Black comedy, sitcom
- Written by: Caroline Aherne; Craig Cash; Henry Normal
- Directed by: John Birkin
- Starring: Caroline Aherne; Craig Cash; Brian Murphy
- Voices of: Steve Coogan
- Country of origin: United Kingdom
- Original language: English
- No. of seasons: 1
- No. of episodes: 6

Production
- Executive producers: Andy Harries; Bill Hilary
- Producer: Glenn Wilhide
- Editor: Geoff Hogg
- Running time: 25 minutes
- Production company: Granada Television

Original release
- Network: BBC One
- Release: 22 February – 29 March 1999

Related
- The Mrs Merton Show (1995–1998); The Royle Family (1998–2012); Early Doors (2003)

Mrs Merton and Malcolm is a British black comedy sitcom produced by Granada Television for BBC One, first broadcast from 22 February to 29 March 1999. Written by Caroline Aherne, Craig Cash and Henry Normal, it stars Aherne as Dorothy Merton and Cash as her adult son Malcolm, with Brian Murphy as family friend Arthur Capstick.

A spin-off from The Mrs Merton Show, the series is set in Heaton Norris, Stockport, and follows Mrs Merton and Malcolm’s tightly controlled daily routine, punctuated by visits from Capstick and Mrs Merton’s one-sided bedside conversations with her largely unseen, bedbound husband. Steve Coogan provides recurring voiceover roles throughout the series and appears on-screen in the final episode.

== Format ==
The main characters are Mrs. Dorothy Merton (Caroline Aherne) and her son Malcolm (Craig Cash), who live together in Heaton Norris, a suburb of Stockport in Greater Manchester, with the bedridden and almost invisible Mr Merton.

Each episode follows a very strict format, following the course of a single day. Mrs Merton and Malcolm have a conversation over the breakfast table at the start, and at the end she puts him to bed and then has an eerie one-way "conversation" with the silent Mr Merton. The events of the episode prove so exhausting or over-exciting for Malcolm that his mother always offers to ring work for him and get him the following day off.

The central event of each episode is the visit from friend of the family Arthur Capstick, played by UK sitcom veteran Brian Murphy, who mentions something to Mrs Merton (usually about the death of a neighbour) and then forgets he's said it. He has a cup of tea and is offered a snack, but dithers over which one to have, despite the fact that "they're all the same, Arthur". He then says he will pop up to see Mr Merton, but forgets to go and has to be prompted. He takes with him some type of traditional sweet treat for Mr Merton, and sits beside the bed and entertains him somehow.

In episode 3, Mr Capstick goes upstairs to see Mr Merton before he has his cup of tea. After he has his tea, he says he will go upstairs to see Mr Merton, so this radical diversion from the routine is too much for him in his senile state.

Steve Coogan is a constant presence, providing the voices for an unctuous disk jockey and Malcolm's motivational tapes, and also appearing in the last episode as the vicar. Mr Malik the chemist appears in several episodes, played by Rashid Karapiet.

The show is characterised by a strange persistence of attitudes and fashions apparently preserved from decades earlier. Malcolm is 37 and has the personality and interests of a child, although not a contemporary one: he likes building model aeroplanes. The implication is that the characters have been trapped in a timewarp since the late 1960s, and that this is probably as a result of Mrs Merton's firm insistence that things should stay as they are, even if we must occasionally make an effort to stay in touch with the present: "People don't want trifle in the 90s," as she puts it.

== Episodes ==
| Episode number | Original airdate | Plot |
|---|---|---|
| 1 | 22 February 1999 | It's Malcolm's 37th birthday. His height is measured by his mother, but it turns out to be the same as last year. No one turns up to his party apart from Mr Capstick, despite his mother having made "potted beef sandwiches", referring to a low-cost sandwich filling that has been declining in popularity as the UK's post-war living standards have improved. Mr Capstick chooses a Garibaldi biscuit at tea, and sings "Oh What a Lovely War" to Mr Merton (who is asleep) after bringing him some Sherbet lemons. |
| 2 | 1 March 1999 | Justin, a precocious young neighbour, comes to visit. He competes with Malcolm in Snakes and Ladders, apple bobbing, hula hoop, musical chairs, arm wrestling, ping pong, Buckaroo and tiddlywinks. Mr Capstick chooses a malt loaf at tea, and plays the spoons for Mr Merton after bringing him some Victory Vs. |
| 3 | 8 March 1999 | Malcolm finds love at the chemist, but will shop assistant Judith Potts fall for him? He successfully invites her to the pictures, even though his mother has discussed his dandruff in front of her. Mr Capstick chooses a Madeira cake at tea, and sings "If You Were the Only Girl (in the World)" to Mr Merton (who is asleep) after bringing him some barley sugars. |
| 4 | 15 March 1999 | Malcolm is poorly, and although he doesn't want to bother the doctor Mrs Merton is worried about her little boy. It transpires that a snake is being delivered at the pet shop where Malcolm works and he was worried about handling it. Mr Capstick chooses a fig roll at tea, and sings "Starman" to Mr Merton after bringing him some Fox's Glacier Mints. |
| 5 | 22 March 1999 | Mrs Merton's Scottish identical sister Morag comes to visit, and Mrs Merton turns cupid as she tries to pair Morag with Mr Capstick. There are several references to Mr Merton's breathing apparatus requiring attention, but Mrs Merton keeps putting this off. Mr Capstick chooses a lemon finger (a small, lemon-flavoured cake) at tea, and sings "The Drugs Don't Work" to Mr Merton after bringing him some pear drops. |
| 6 | 29 March 1999 | As Mrs Merton comes to terms with the loss of her bedridden husband, Malcolm adjusts to his new role as man of the house. We hear that he gave a recorder recital of "Three Blind Mice", and went on the bouncy castle. The usual routine with Mr Capstick is played out but with some necessary differences: he can only mention the sweet treat he most recently brought for Mr Merton, and he sits by the now vacant bed and sings in a surprisingly moving scene. Mr Capstick chooses a custard cream at tea, and sings "Seasons in the Sun" to Mr Merton after bringing him some nut brittle. |

== Development ==
The character of Mrs Merton had previously appeared for four years in her own spoof chat show, The Mrs Merton Show. In it, she very often mentioned "my son Malcolm", but he only appeared three times. On his debut appearance, he played his recorder, and for his second appearance, he enjoyed a kiss with actress Joanna Lumley. His final appearance was in the Christmas 1997 show, when he sang one line in "Perfect Day". Both characters also appeared in some advertisements for British Gas, which were the direct forerunner of the sitcom.

There are a few references to the BBC corporate hierarchy in the script. Malcolm's miserly boss at the pet shop is called Geoffrey Perkins, then the Head of Comedy at the BBC. Mr Capstick also mentions how he and Mr Merton used to go scrumping for apples in Mr Yentob's garden (a reference to Alan Yentob).

== Reception ==
The show achieved very good figures for a new sitcom, but the critical reception was generally hostile because of the manchild character, Malcolm. Time Out magazine described it as "possibly the most disturbing show on television". This critical reaction took the writers aback. Tony Hayman of the TV Times concisely stated" what the hell is this bollocks?"

The writers insisted that their intention was simply to create an absurd situation for comic effect, but some critics took Malcolm to be a semi-serious depiction of mental illness or a sufferer of infantilism, and others suggested that there was something incestuous about the relationship between Malcolm and his mother.

Mrs Merton also dominates her invalid husband, who is completely bedridden and mute, and so barely exists as a character except as a lump under some bedsheets. Her one-sided conversations with him give the impression that his condition suits her lifestyle perfectly well. On Malcolm's birthday she says, "It's days like this I wish your father wasn't bedridden!" Malcolm is also quite unmoved by his father's condition; he has a go on the bouncy castle at the funeral. The only way it affects him is that it reminds him of when his pet hamster died. This aspect of the programme, combined with the lack of a laughter track (still relatively unusual for a UK sitcom at the time), caused some critics to regard the show as unbearably bleak.

As a result of the critical fallout, the writers decided to focus instead on a second series of their other creation, The Royle Family, which was far better received by both critics and audiences. A planned Christmas special episode was abandoned before the original run had finished.
