= Gogglebox =

British reality television show

- Genre: Reality; Reaction
- Created by: Stephen Lambert; Tania Alexander
- Directed by: Tania Alexander (2013–2020); Tom Hutchings (2013); Jon Cahn (2013); Kayleigh Damen (2013); James Bainbridge (2013); Mike Cotton (2020–present)
- Creative directors: Tania Alexander (2013–2020); Tim Harcourt (2014–present); Mike Cotton (2020–present)
- Narrated by: Caroline Aherne; Craig Cash
- Opening theme: "Perfect World" and "Brand New Day" by Kodaline
- Country of origin: United Kingdom
- Original language: English
- No. of episodes: (list of episodes)

Production
- Executive producers: Tania Alexander (2013–2020); Leon Campbell (2016–present); Mike Cotton (2020–present); Victoria Ray (2021–present)
- Camera setup: Dual cameras
- Running time: 36 minutes (series 1–2); 46–47 minutes (series 3–present)
- Production company: Studio Lambert

Original release
- Network: Channel 4
- Release: 7 March 2013 – present

Gogglebox is a British reality television series created by Stephen Lambert, Tania Alexander and Tim Harcourt, and broadcast on Channel 4. The series documents families and groups of friends around the United Kingdom who are filmed for their observations and reactions to the previous week's television from their own homes. The first series launched on 7 March 2013, with the twenty-eighth series airing from 4 September 2026. The show was narrated by Caroline Aherne from its launch until April 2016, shortly before her death, after which Craig Cash took over.

The show has won numerous awards. In 2014 and 2022, it won a BAFTA in the Reality & Constructed Factual category. From 2015 to 2018, in 2021, 2022 and 2023, it won a National Television Award. The success of Gogglebox spawned three spin-off series, including a version featuring children (Gogglesprogs: 2016–2017), a version featuring 16- to 24-year-olds as they watch online content (Vlogglebox: 2017) and a version featuring celebrities (Celebrity Gogglebox: 2019–present).

== History ==
The show was created by Stephen Lambert, Tania Alexander, and Tim Harcourt. Lambert is a media executive who had previously launched the Channel 4 television shows Wife Swap, Faking It, Undercover Boss, and The Secret Millionaire. Alexander was Director of Factual Entertainment at Lambert's independent production company Studio Lambert, who said the idea was for Gogglebox to be a mix of the ITV comedy show Harry Hill's TV Burp, which looked back at the previous week's television, and the BBC sitcom The Royle Family, which centres on a television-fixated family, but with real, ordinary people. Harcourt, a Creative Director for Studio Lambert, had the original idea for Gogglebox while watching the 2011 London riots, and along with Alexander, devised the format for the show. They wondered what people talked about while watching the news, and came up with the idea of cutting between people watching the same TV shows. Farah Golant, the boss of All3Media, said: "But the show isn't really about TV. The show is about people's lives, their relationships, their living rooms and the way children and parents talk about TV [...] That's quite priceless. It captures a cultural response to something that's happening in the world."

The concept of Gogglebox was criticised before the show aired; Alexander recalled people thinking Channel 4 had run out of ideas, but credited the network's head of factual David Glover as the one who recognised the show's potential and subsequently ordered Alexander to produce a proof of concept tape. The show's team set about casting, and it was during this period they signed on Leon and June Bernicoff. Alexander described the original reel as "a little rough around the edges, gosh it was actually really rough", and thought the script was "God awful" which was read by a narrator whose tone of voice was incompatible. Despite this, Glover felt strongly towards the concept and gave the green-light for a mini-series. The first series consisted of four episodes, the first of which aired on 7 March 2013. The show was a success, and a second series of 13 episodes began in September 2013.

In November 2020, Alexander left Gogglebox after seven years. She was replaced by Studio Lambert's deputy creative director, Mike Cotton, alongside Gogglebox executive producer Leon Campbell.

== Production ==
The people cast on Gogglebox were found by the show, and the producers do not advertise for participants. Lambert said this approach is key to the show's success as it results in more likeable people and the audience can get to know the cast over time. From the beginning, Alexander did not want to feature people who wanted to be on television, and sought individuals "that had the ability to make us laugh very naturally and that's quite hard." One of the methods used to find participants is termed "street casting", whereby the show's team looked in everyday public places; Leon and June were found in a bridge club, and Stephen and Chris were found in a hair salon. In later series, members of the show's production team visited random houses and held up a card that contained something, such as a picture of the British Prime Minister or a Daily Mail headline, and noted how quick the person responded and any funny, interesting, or insightful comments they had. The show has also found participants through recommendations, which was how the Siddiqui family and couple Giles and Mary were found.

The programme is filmed in the viewers' homes using two small remotely controlled cameras, known as "hot heads", operated by a small team elsewhere in the home that set up a temporary production control room. This team consists of a producer/director, gallery operator, assistant, audio engineer, researcher for live logging, and a runner. Each episode of Gogglebox is made in two days, and Alexander said that people who assumed the show is cheap or easy to make made her "blood boil". Filming starts on Friday and continues through the week, but most of the first four days are spent assessing the filmed material. Four-person crews circulate between the households two or three evenings each week, and the cast watch the same programmes as each other, which can amount to as much as six hours of television.

Alexander said that the biggest problem encountered during the filming stage is the cast forgetting that they are meant to be commenting and having to be given "gentle prompts". She added that "the craft happens over the last couple of days before it goes out on the Friday", which usually begins on a Tuesday afternoon or the Wednesday, with the production team working through the night to produce an initial cut. Lambert said the skill involved is "throwing away 99.9% of what people say". The team reviews the first edit on a Thursday afternoon, after which further cuts or tweaks are made before the narration is recorded and the episode is delivered for broadcast.

== Cast ==
This is a list of cast members currently appearing in the programme.

Cast members		Series	Year
Siddiqui family (Sid, Umar, Baasit and Raza)		1–present	2013–present
Jenny Newby and Lee Riley		4–present	2014–present
The Malone Family (Tom Sr., Julie, Vanessa and Shaun)		4–present	2014–present
Giles Wood and Mary Killen		5–present	2015–present
Ellie and Izzi Warner		6–present	2015–present
David and Shirley Griffiths		6–present	2015–present
Plummer family (Tremaine, Twaine and Tristan)		8–present (Note: Amira and Amani and the Plummer family also appeared in the Celebrity Gogglebox Black to Front special (series 3, episode 9).)	2016–present
Amira Rota	Iqra	10–12 (Note: Amira originally appeared alongside friend Iqra from series 10 to 12, until Iqra was replaced by Amira's sister Amani.)	2017–2018
Amira Rota	Amani Rota	13–present	2018–present
Worthington family (Alison, George and Helena)		10–present	2017–present
Pete and Sophie Sandiford		10–present	2017–present
Abbie Lynn and Georgia Bell		12–present	2018–present
Sue and Steve Sheehan		14–present	2019–present
Simon and Jane Minty		18–present	2021–present
Ronnie and Annie		18–present	2021–present
Danielle and Daniella		20–present	2022–present
Teresa and Anita		23–present	2024–present
Michael, Sally, Jake and Harry		24–present	2024–present
Andrew and Alfie		26–present	2025–present
Jake and Calum		26–present	2025–present
Sara and Lara		26–present	2025–present
Sarah, Cheé and Andre		26–present	2025–present
Susie and Rosie		26–present	2025–present

== Episodes ==
Series	Episodes	Originally released	
Series	Episodes	First released	Last released
1	4	7 March 2013	28 March 2013
2	13	25 September 2013	18 December 2013
3	12	7 March 2014	23 May 2014
4	12	26 September 2014	19 December 2014
5	12	20 February 2015	8 May 2015
6	15	11 September 2015	18 December 2015
7	17	19 February 2016	10 June 2016
Gogglesprogs 1	6	17 June 2016	22 July 2016
8	12	23 September 2016	16 December 2016
9	15	24 February 2017	2 June 2017
Gogglesprogs 2	6	9 June 2017	14 July 2017
Vlogglebox	6	18 June 2017	23 July 2017
10	15	8 September 2017	24 December 2017
11	16	23 February 2018	18 June 2018
12	15	7 September 2018	21 December 2018
13	15	22 February 2019	31 May 2019
Celebrity 1	6	14 June 2019	19 July 2019
14	15	13 September 2019	3 January 2020
15	15	21 February 2020	29 May 2020
Celebrity 2	7	5 June 2020	17 July 2020
16	15	11 September 2020	8 January 2021
17	14	26 February 2021	6 August 2021
Celebrity 3	9	4 June 2021	10 September 2021
18	14	17 September 2021	2 January 2022
19	16	18 February 2022	3 June 2022
Celebrity 4	6	10 June 2022	15 July 2022
20	15	9 September 2022	2 January 2023
21	16	24 February 2023	9 June 2023
Celebrity 5	6	16 June 2023	21 July 2023
22	16	8 September 2023	1 January 2024
23	15	16 February 2024	24 May 2024
Celebrity 6	6	7 June 2024	12 July 2024
24	16	13 September 2024	1 January 2025
25	15	14 February 2025	23 May 2025
Celebrity 7	7	6 June 2025	11 July 2025
26	17	5 September 2025	1 January 2026
27	16	6 February 2026	22 May 2026
Celebrity 8	7	5 June 2026	17 July 2026
28	16	4 September 2026	TBA

== Awards and nominations ==
Award	Year	Result
BAFTA TV Award for "Reality & Constructed Factual Programme"	2014	Won
BAFTA TV Award for "Radio Times Audience Award"	2014	Nominated
Royal Television Society Award for "Popular Factual and Features"	2014	Won
Broadcasting Press Guild for "Best Factual Entertainment Programme"	2014	Won
National Television Award for "Factual Programme"	2015	Won
TV Choice Award for "Factual Entertainment Show"	2015	Won
National Television Award for "Factual Programme"	2016	Won
BAFTA TV Award for "Reality & Constructed Factual Programme"	2016	Nominated
TV Choice Award for "Lifestyle Show"	2016	Won
Radio 1's Teen Award for "TV Show"	2016	Won
National Television Award for "Factual Entertainment"	2017	Won
Diversity in Media Awards for "TV Programme of the Year"	2017	Won
National Television Award for "Factual Entertainment"	2018	Won
National Television Award for "Factual Entertainment"	2019	Nominated
National Television Award for "Factual Entertainment"	2020	Nominated
I Talk Telly Awards for "Best Factual Entertainment Programme	2020	Won
BAFTA TV Award for "Must-See Moment"	2021	Nominated
TV Choice Award for "Best Entertainment Show"	2021	Won
National Television Award for "Factual Programme"	2021	Won
BAFTA TV Award for "Reality & Constructed Factual Programme"	2022	Won
National Television Award for "Factual Programme"	2022	Won
National Television Award for "The Bruce Forsyth Entertainment Award"	2023	Won

== Spin-off series ==
A version of the show featuring children, titled Gogglesprogs, launched as a Christmas special on Christmas Day 2015, and was followed by a full-length series that began airing on 17 June 2016. In 2017, a spin-off show titled Vlogglebox aired on E4, which featured reactions from 16 to 24-year-olds as they watch online content on their smartphones, laptops or tablets. In 2019, it was announced that a celebrity version had been ordered; Celebrity Gogglebox began airing in 2019. It was later renewed for a second series, which aired in 2020, a third series that aired in 2021, and a fourth series in 2022.

In August 2022, it was announced that a Welsh-language version of the show, called Gogglebocs Cymru, would be produced for S4C, after Channel 4 had agreed to release exclusivity of its rights to the show in the UK. S4C issued a competitive tender for the production rights on the same day, with the show scheduled to debut in autumn 2022 as part of the channel's 40th anniversary.

== International versions ==
=== Gogglebox around the world ===
Currently airing
No longer airing

Country	Name	Channel	Date aired	Series
Australia	Gogglebox Australia	Lifestyle (Pay TV, 2015–24); Network 10 (Free-to-air, 2015–)	11 February 2015 – present	Series 1, 2015; Series 2, 2015; Series 3, 2016; Series 4, 2016; Series 5, 2017; Series 6, 2017; Series 7, 2018; Series 8, 2018; Series 9, 2019; Series 10, 2019; Series 11, 2020; Series 12, 2020; Series 13, 2021; Series 14, 2021; Series 15, 2022; Series 16, 2022; Series 17, 2023; Series 18, 2023; Series 19, 2024; Series 20, 2024; Series 21, 2025; Series 22, 2025
Belgium	Vu à la télé	RTL-TVI	19 October 2014 – present	Series 1, 2014; Series 2, 2015; Series 3, 2015; Series 4, 2016; Series 5, 2016; Series 6, 2017; Series 7, 2017; Series 8, 2018; Series 9, 2018; Series 10, 2019; Series 11, 2019; Series 12, 2020; Series 13, 2021; Series 14, 2021; Series 15, 2022; Series 16, 2022; Series 17, 2023
Belgium	Hallo televisie!	Eén	6 January 2015 – 1 January 2016	Series 1, 2015; Series 2, 2016
Czech Republic	TBC			
Finland	Sohvaperunat	Yle TV2 Yle TV1	27 February 2015 – present	Series 1, 2015; Series 2, 2016; Series 3, 2017; Series 4, 2017; Series 5, 2018; Series 6, 2018; Series 7, 2019; Series 8, 2019; Series 9, 2020; Series 10, 2020; Series 11, 2021; Series 12, 2021; Series 13, 2022; Series 14, 2022; Series 15, 2023; Series 16, 2023; Series 17, 2024; Series 18, 2024; Series 19, 2025; Series 20, 2025; Series 21, 2026
France	Vu à la télé	M6	18 October 2014 – 20 December 2014	Series 1, 2014
Germany	Wohnzimmerhelden	Sat.1	16 December 2014 – 23 December 2014	Series 1, 2014
Germany	Sofa Star	RTL Television	1 January 2015 – 30 January 2015	Series 1, 2015
Hungary	Kanapéhuszárok	RTL	24 November 2023 – 22 December 2023	Series 1, 2023
Ireland	Gogglebox Ireland	TV3/Virgin Media One	22 September 2016 – present	Series 1, 2016; Series 2, 2017; Series 3, 2017; Series 4, 2018; Series 5, 2019; Series 6, 2020; Series 7, 2021; Series 8, 2022 Series 9, 2023 Series 10, 2024
Israel	Tadliku (תדליקו)	Channel 2	12–20 June 2014	Series 1, 2014
Italy	Gogglebox Italia	Italia 1	23 October 2016 – 4 June 2017	Series 1, 2016; Series 2, 2017
Japan	Gogglebox Japan (ゴグルボックス)	NHK	24 March 2016	Pilot, 2016
Latvia	Dīvāna eksperti	TV3	11 March 2022 – 27 May 2022	Series 1, 2022
Mongolia	Ardin Buidan (Ардын буйдан)	Mongol HD TV; ORI TV (2018–)	27 March 2016 – present	Series 1, 2016; Series 2, 2016; Series 3, 2017; Series 4, 2017; Series 5, 2017; Series 6, 2018; Series 7, 2018; Series 8, 2019; Series 9, 2019; Series 10, 2020; Series 11, 2020; Series 12, 2021; Series 13, 2021; Series 14, 2022; Series 15, 2022; Series 16, 2023
New Zealand	Gogglebox NZ	Three	19 September 2018 – 7 November 2018	Series 1, 2018
Norway	Sofa	NRK	23 October 2014 – 17 March 2017	Series 1, 2014; Series 2, 2015; Series 3, 2016; Series 4, 2017
Norway	Sofa (celebrity version)	TV 2	21 January 2021 – present	Series 1, 2021; Series 2, 2021; Series 3, 2022; Series 4, 2023
Poland	Gogglebox. Przed telewizorem (Note: In the beginning, when the first series was broadcast, the show had a shorter title: Gogglebox.)	TTV	6 September 2014 – present	Series 1, Fall 2014; Series 2, Spring 2015; Series 3, Fall 2015; Series 4, Spring 2016; Series 5, Fall 2016; Series 6, Spring 2017; Series 7, Fall 2017; Series 8, Spring 2018; Series 9, Fall 2018; Series 10, Spring 2019; Series 11, Fall 2019; Series 12, Spring 2020; Series 13, Fall 2020; Series 14, Spring 2021; Series 15, Fall 2021; Series 16, Spring 2022; Series 17, Fall 2022; Series 18, Spring 2023; Series 19, Fall 2023; Series 20, Spring 2024; Series 21, Fall 2024; Series 22, Spring 2025
Russia	Divan (Диван)	STS	30 March 2017 – 18 May 2017	Series 1, 2017
Slovenia	Bognedaj, da bi crknu televisor	Planet TV	September 2014 – 19 June 2016	Series 1, 2014; Series 2, 2015; Series 3, 2015; Series 4, 2016
South Africa	Gogglebox South Africa	Sony Channel	3 March 2016 – 5 May 2016	Series 1, 2016
South Korea	Jakjunghago Bonbangsasu (작정하고 본방사수)	KBS 2TV	8 January 2015 – 2 February 2015	Series 1, 2015
Spain	Aquí mando yo	Antena 3	15 April 2016	Series 1, 2016
Ukraine	What's on TV? (Що по телеку?)	ICTV	16 October 2015 – 27 November 2015	Series 1, 2015
United States; Canada	The People's Couch	Bravo	10 March 2014 – 26 May 2016	Series 1, 2014; Series 2, 2014; Series 3, 2015; Series 4, 2016
United States	Celebrity Watch Party	Fox	7 May 2020 – 23 July 2020	Series 1, 2020
Wales	Gogglebocs Cymru	S4C/BBC iPlayer	2 November 2022	Series 1, 2022; Series 2, 2023 (upcoming)

=== Australian version ===
An Australian edition of the programme debuted on 11 February 2015. It is a co-production between pay TV provider Foxtel and commercial Network Ten. It airs on Foxtel's Lifestyle Channel first and is repeated 24 hours later on Ten. The programme started its second season on 30 September 2015, and its third season in 2016. It is currently in its 23rd season as of April 2026.

=== American and Canadian versions ===
Canadian (Bell Media), and American broadcasters. The American and Canadian versions, both called The People's Couch, premiered on Bravo on 10 March 2014 (although a three-episode pilot run was aired in October 2013) and Bravo (Canadian TV channel) in July 2014.

A celebrity version, called Celebrity Watch Party, premiered on Fox on 7 May 2020.

=== Irish version ===
An Irish edition of the programme debuted on 22 September 2016, a co-production between Kite Entertainment (Dublin) and Studio Lambert (London). By 2023, nine series had been broadcast.

=== Polish version ===
Polish version called Gogglebox. Przed telewizorem premiered on TTV on 6 September 2014.

=== Russian version ===
A Russian version called Диван (translated as "The Couch") premiered on CTC on 30 March 2017. Only one season aired, consisting of 8 episodes.

=== Finnish version ===
The Finnish version called Sohvaperunat (translated as "Couch potatoes") premiered in February 2015 on YLE TV1.

=== Welsh version ===
S4C and Studio Lambert aired Gogglebocs Cymru on 2 November 2022, as part of the channel's 40th anniversary celebrations. The show is narrated by Welsh comedian Tudur Owen.

The series was renewed for a second series slated to air on 18 October 2023. It has also been nominated for a BAFTA Cymru award.

== See also ==
- The Royle Family
