= The Mrs Merton Show =

British television chat show

- Also known as: Mrs Merton in Las Vegas
- Directed by: Pati Marr; Tony Prescott; Dominic Brigstocke; Philippa Robinson
- Starring: Caroline Aherne
- Country of origin: United Kingdom
- Original language: English
- No. of series: 4 (+ 2 pilots)
- No. of episodes: 30 (incl. 6 specials)

Production
- Executive producers: Andy Harries; Clive Tulloh
- Producers: Peter Kessler; Mark Gorton; Spencer Campbell; Philippa Robinson
- Running time: 30 minutes
- Production company: Granada Television

Original release
- Network: Granada TV (pilot); BBC Two (series 1–2); BBC One (series 3–4)
- Release: 5 December 1993 – 2 April 1998

Related
- Mrs Merton and Malcolm

The Mrs Merton Show was a mock talk show starring Caroline Aherne, also credited as Caroline Hook, as the elderly host Mrs Dorothy Merton.

Originally portraying 'Mrs Murton' in a pilot for Yorkshire TV which was not picked up, Caroline Aherne retooled the character, making her older, and recorded a second pilot in 1993 for Granada Television, who commissioned the series. Running from 10 February 1995 to 2 April 1998, it was produced by Granada and aired on the BBC. The writers included Aherne, Craig Cash, Henry Normal and, for the first few series, Dave Gorman.

== Character origination ==
The character was first created in 1986 on Piccadilly Radio, first played by Kate Copstick, being replaced by Caroline Aherne in 1988.

Prior to television success, Aherne's Mrs Merton character appeared on Frank Sidebottom's album 5/9/88 and on Aherne's KFM Radio show in Stockport.

The character first appeared on national radio in the late 1980s, on Radio 2, produced by Mark Radcliffe, and also on BBC GMR. Aherne was offered £10 by BBC GMR, which Radio 2 raised to £15.

After that she made a few appearances on local television in the north west including Granada's Saturday morning show Express! and on the Yorkshire Television series, Frank’s Fantastic Shed Show. On the former show, presented by I Am Kloot's John 'Johnny Dangerously' Bramwell and Sumy Kuraishe, she was the regular celebrity interviewer and interviewed guests from a number of random locations in the north west, whilst the latter show was with Chris Sievey in his Sidebottom persona.

The character first appeared on satellite TV for the BSB (British Satellite Broadcasting) children's programme 'Cool Cube', made by Granada, with Zoe Ball as a researcher, in the early 1990s. Caroline had no ownership of the copyright to the character.

Her national terrestrial television debut came on the 1991 Channel 4 gameshow Remote Control, hosted by Anthony H Wilson. The talk show was followed up by a sitcom, Mrs Merton and Malcolm, based on Mrs Merton and her son Malcolm, who was played by Craig Cash.

== Television series history ==
For the first two series, the house band was Hooky and the Boys, fronted by Aherne's then husband Peter Hook. Following their marital break up the band was replaced by The Patrick Trio from the 1996 Christmas special until the end of the show's run in 1998.

In 1997 the production moved to Las Vegas for a series of specials with Hollywood stars. The series was not well received and was slated by critic Garry Bushell amongst others. For the following (and final) series back in the UK, Bushell was a guest and got appropriately roasted by Mrs Merton and her studio audience.

In an interview in November 2001 Aherne revealed that she did not want to carry on with the show and wanted to write a sitcom with Craig Cash and only agreed to a final series if she could do it. This became the BAFTA Award winning The Royle Family.

In August 2006 a poll of 4,000 people was commissioned by UKTV Gold for the best comic one-liner. In second place was a line from The Mrs Merton Show when she famously asked Debbie McGee, "So, what first attracted you to the millionaire Paul Daniels?"

In 2022, the Patrick Trio-era series was acquired by That's TV for its comedy line-up which also included repeats of Hale and Pace and Monty Python's Flying Circus

== Format ==
The Mrs Merton Show was a mock chat show which featured real-life celebrities getting outrageous faux-naïf questions from Aherne in her Mrs Merton persona. In one memorable example the wife of magician Paul Daniels, Debbie McGee, was asked "So, what first attracted you to the millionaire Paul Daniels?" whilst in another episode Aherne asked comedian Bernard Manning, after he had clashed with One Foot in the Grave's Richard Wilson, “Who do you vote for now Hitler's dead?” in regard to his racist attitudes.

As well as the celebrity guests and regular band, the show featured a few appearances from Craig Cash as Malcolm and a had audience of pensioners, who would sit behind Mrs Merton and the guests, and who would be used for regular discussion segments and for Aherne to field questions from. This group included a large number of older ladies who would be used for the programme from week-to-week and also included spots for the former child actor Roy Williams, who was known for his brightly coloured clothes and odd views, former Manchester City goalkeeper Harry Dowd and Stockport pensioner Horace Mendelsohn.

== Episodes ==
Series	Episodes	Originally released	
Series	Episodes	First released	Last released
Pilots		Unaired	6 December 1993
1	6	10 February 1995	24 March 1995
2	6	12 November 1995	17 December 1995
2	Special	24 December 1995	
3	Special	24 December 1996	
3	6	14 February 1997	28 March 1997
Specials		10 April 1997	24 April 1997
4	Special	27 December 1997	
4	6	26 February 1998	2 April 1998

=== Pilots ===
No. overall	Title	Original release date
P.	"YTV Pilot"	Unaired
1991: Mrs Murton's Nightcap. Chris Donald, Liz Kershaw and Andy Kershaw
P.	"Granada Pilot"	6 December 1993
Guests: Carol Thatcher, Mark Porter and Terry Christian

=== Series 1 (1995) ===
No. overall	No. in series	Title	Original release date
1	1	"Episode 1"	10 February 1995
Guests: Kriss Akabusi, Debbie McGee, Chris Greener and Steve Coogan.
2	2	"Episode 2"	17 February 1995
Guests: Drusilla Beyfus, Kevin Kennedy, Ken Livingstone and Mandy Smith
3	3	"Episode 3"	24 February 1995
Guests: Jilly Goolden, Cynthia Payne, Arthur Tomlinson (UFO expert) and Dave Lee Travis
4	4	"Episode 4"	3 March 1995
Guests: Dale Winton, Mary Whitehouse (not in the studio), Royal butler Peter Russell and Derek Jameson
5	5	"Episode 5"	10 March 1995
Guests: Russell Grant, Countess Bienvenida Sokolow (former wife of Antony Buck) and Fred Talbot
6	6	"Episode 6"	24 March 1995
Guests: Ned Sherrin, Mr Motivator, Terry Major-Ball and Nick Owen

=== Series 2 (1995) ===
No. overall	No. in series	Title	Original release date
Series
7	1	"Episode 1"	12 November 1995
Guests: Jo Brand, Lorraine Kelly and Chris Eubank
8	2	"Episode 2"	19 November 1995
Guests: Matthew Kelly, Vic Reeves and Bob Mortimer and George Best
9	3	"Episode 3"	26 November 1995
Guests: Germaine Greer, PJ and Duncan and Michael Parkinson
10	4	"Episode 4"	3 December 1995
Guests: Jimmy Hill, Andrew Neil and Paul Daniels
11	5	"Episode 5"	10 December 1995
Guests: Peter Stringfellow, Des Lynam and Rolf Harris
12	6	"Episode 6"	17 December 1995
Guests: Patrick Lichfield, Carol Vorderman and Barbara Windsor
Special
13	S.	"Christmas Special"	24 December 1995
Guests: Johnny Briggs and Amanda Barrie, Glenys Kinnock and Gary Rhodes

=== Series 3 (1996–97) ===
No. overall	No. in series	Title	Original release date
Special
14	S.	"Christmas Special"	24 December 1996
Guests: Noddy Holder, Clive James and Daniel O'Donnell
Series
15	1	"Episode 1"	14 February 1997
Guests: Jeff Banks and Jonathan Ross
16	2	"Episode 2"	21 February 1997
Guests: Michael Winner and Teresa Gorman
17	3	"Episode 3"	28 February 1997
Guests: Sacha Distel and Jeremy Clarkson
18	4	"Episode 4"	7 March 1997
Guests: Boy George and Vinnie Jones
19	5	"Episode 5"	21 March 1997
Guests: Keith Chegwin and Ian Botham
20	6	"Episode 6"	28 March 1997
Guests: Joanna Lumley and Martin Clunes

=== Mrs Merton in Las Vegas (1997) ===
No. overall	Title	Original release date
21	"Episode 1"	10 April 1997
Guests: Tony Curtis and Patrick Duffy
22	"Episode 2"	17 April 1997
Guests: Engelbert Humperdinck and Bo Derek
23	"Planes, Trains and Zimmer Frames"	24 April 1997
A mockumentary of Mrs Merton's visit to Las Vegas with her audience

=== Series 4 (1997–98) ===
No. overall	No. in series	Title	Original release date
Special
24	S.	"Christmas Special"	27 December 1997
Guests: Edwina Currie and Max Bygraves
Series
25	1	"Episode 1"	26 February 1998
Guests: Keith Floyd and Melinda Messenger
26	2	"Episode 2"	5 March 1998
Guests: Shane Richie and Wayne Sleep
27	3	"Episode 3"	12 March 1998
Guests: Garry Bushell and Lisa Stansfield
28	4	"Episode 4"	19 March 1998
Guests: Richard Wilson and Bernard Manning
29	5	"Episode 5"	26 March 1998
Guests: Barry McGuigan and Nigel Kennedy
30	6	"Episode 6"	2 April 1998
Guests: Richard Whiteley and Jimmy Tarbuck

== Media releases ==
- The Best of The Mrs Merton Show: Series One (VHS) – Released: 7 October 1996
- The Best of The Mrs Merton Show: Series Two (VHS) – Released: 4 November 1996
- The Complete Series (DVD) – Released: 25 February 2008
