= Dean Andrews =

English actor (born 1963)

- Born: 6 August 1963 (age 63); Rotherham, South Yorkshire, England
- Occupation: Actor
- Years active: 2001–present
- Spouse: Helen Bowen-Green
- Children: 2

Dean Andrews (born 6 August 1963) is an English actor. He is known for his role as DS Ray Carling in the BBC drama series Life on Mars. He continued the role in the sequel series, Ashes to Ashes, until 2010. As of April 2019, he appeared as Will Taylor on ITV soap opera Emmerdale. Andrews left the show on 26 December 2024 when his character Will died of a heart attack.

== Early life and education ==
Born in 1963 in Rotherham, Andrews went to Sitwell Junior School on Grange Road and Oakwood Comprehensive School on Moorgate Road. He went to school with Top Gear presenter James May.

== Career ==
Dean Andrews started off as a mainstay of cruise ships as a talented entertainer and singer. He was discovered by film director Ken Loach, who was looking for people from Yorkshire to appear in the 2001 film, The Navigators. He then went on to play Barry Shiel in the Channel 4 drama Buried, which won the BAFTA Award for Best Drama Series in 2004. That year, he also had a small role, as Neil, in the Channel 4 series No Angels.

In 2005, Andrews appeared in one episode of the ITV drama Wire in the Blood. The following year, he appeared in another BBC drama, Life On Mars, as DS Ray Carling. He then had roles in two BBC dramas, True Dare Kiss and The Street, in 2007. Andrews again played DC Carling in Ashes to Ashes, a 2008 spin-off series of Life on Mars. During the same year, he recorded voiceovers for Currys television advertisements. He had a guest role in 2010 on the BBC One series Waterloo Road.

In 2011, Andrews appeared in: the BBC drama The Body Farm as Peter Collins; the BBC Two television film United, about the Manchester United "Busby Babes" team and the 1958 Munich air disaster; ITV's supernatural drama series Marchlands, playing one of the lead roles; and the five-part BBC One series The Case, in which he played the lead role as a man accused of murdering his terminally ill girlfriend.

From November 2012, Andrews appeared in all four series of the BBC drama Last Tango in Halifax as Robert "Robbie" Greenwood. The following year, he portrayed Pete Lewis in the BBC show Being Eileen. Andrews played local hotel and barman Tom Asher in a 2015 episode of the popular series Midsomer Murders on ITV. In 2019, the actor joined the cast of ITV soap opera Emmerdale. He left the soap on 26 December 2024 when his character Will died of a heart attack. He has stated that he was not told about the character's demise. He narrated the Channel 5 documentary series, Our Great Yorkshire Life, in 2022. He also narrates the UK TV show Casualty 24/7 which centres on Barnsley Hospital.

== Filmography ==
Year	Title	Role	Other notes
2001	The Navigators	John	BAFTA-winning for screenwriter
2002	EastEnders	Dean	Episode dated 3 April 2002
2003	Buried	Barry Sheil	3 episodes
2003	Clocking Off	DS Hughes	Episode: "Colin's Story"
2003	Between the Sheets	Steve Ashby	6 episodes
2004	No Angels	Neil	3 episodes
2004	Casualty	Reg Summerston	Episode: "Don't Go There"
2004	Blue Murder	Will Harmon	Episode: "Lonely"
2004	My Summer of Love	Ricky	BAFTA-winning film
2005	Love + Hate	Derek	
2005	Wire in the Blood	Steve Maynard	Episode: "Bad Seed"
2005	Faith	Davey	Television film
2006	Shameless	Geoff Mulligan	Episode #3.1
2006	Missing	Mark Lanser	2 episodes
2006	New Street Law	Dennis Longwell	Episode: "Shock to the System"
2006–2007	Life on Mars	DS Ray Carling	Series 1–2; 16 episodes
2007	True Dare Kiss	Vinny	2 episodes
2007	The Street	Cleggy	Episode: "The Letter"
2008–2010	Ashes to Ashes	DS Ray Carling	Series 1–3; 24 episodes
2009	Wish 143	Bus Driver	Short film
2010	Waterloo Road	Gary Vale	Episode #5.11
2010	Doctors	Jonty Stephens	Episode: "A Spoonful"
2011	Marchlands	Eddie Maynard	5 episodes
2011	The Body Farm	Peter Collins	Episode: "No Peace for the Wicked"
2011	The Case	Tony Powell	5 episodes
2011	Just Henry	Bill	Television film
2012–2016	Last Tango in Halifax	Robbie	Series 1–4; 20 episodes
2013	Being Eileen	Pete Lewis	6 episodes
2013	The Security Men	Ray	Episode: "Pilot"
2013	Frankie	Joseph Corden	3 episodes
2013	Vera	Jonah Regan	Episode: "Poster Child"
2015	Midsomer Murders	Tom Asher	S17E3: "The Ballad of Midsomer County"
2015	Banana	Alan	Episode #1.4
2015	New Tricks	Barry Warnock	Episode: "The Russian Cousin"
2016	Silent Witness	Tony Hamilton	Episode: "After the Fall"
2016	Jericho	Jack Laggan	Episode #1.1
2016	Father Brown	Michael Negal	Episode: "The Star of Jacob"
2017	The Moorside	PC Steve Kinchin	2 episodes
2018	Agatha and the Truth of Murder	Wade	Television film
2018	Delicious	Steven Green	TV series, episode: "The Heart"
2019	London Kills	Jacob Holt	TV series, Episode: “Stag Night”
2019–2024	Emmerdale	Will Taylor	Series regular
2026	Number One Fan	Stewart Jones	TV series

== Awards and nominations ==
Year	Award	Category	Work	Result	Ref.
2011	TV Choice Awards	Best Actor	Marchlands	Nominated	
2019	Inside Soap Awards	Best Bad Boy	Emmerdale	Nominated	
