= Craig Cash =

English comedy writer and performer

- Born: 11 September 1960 (age 66); Stockport, Cheshire, England
- Occupations: Actor; voice actor; writer; director; DJ
- Years active: 1987–present
- Spouse: Stephanie Davies (m. 2000)
- Children: 2

Craig Cash (born 11 September 1960) is an English comedian, actor, voice actor, director and BAFTA award-winning writer and producer. His best known works are in the television shows The Royle Family, The Fast Show, The Mrs Merton Show, Early Doors, Sunshine and most recently The Café, Rovers and After Hours. Cash took over from his Royle Family co-star Caroline Aherne as the narrator of Channel 4's Gogglebox after her death in 2016.

Cash won two BAFTA Television awards for his work on The Royle Family.

== Biography ==
=== Career ===
Cash's father worked as a joiner and he grew up in Stockport. He rose to prominence in the late 1980s/early 1990s as a music radio DJ on south Manchester station KFM, where he worked with Caroline Aherne who had previously developed an Irish nun character, Sister Mary Immaculate. During this period he was also the manager of the band That Uncertain Feeling. In 1999 Cash performed uncredited duties as script editor on That Peter Kay Thing, a fact only revealed in 2004 when he moderated the DVD commentary.

As an actor Cash is best known for playing slightly dim-witted and affable working class northern men, particularly Dave Best in the BBC sitcom The Royle Family, which he co-wrote with Caroline Aherne.

He has also written for The Fast Show and for Aherne on The Mrs Merton Show. With Phil Mealey he wrote the BBC sitcom Early Doors. They went on to write the drama Sunshine, filmed in Marple, and first broadcast on BBC One in 2008. They founded the independent production company Jelly Legs, which produced later The Royle Family specials, "The New Sofa" and "The Golden Egg Cup", as well as Sunshine.

In 2011 Cash directed all six episodes of The Café, a show written by and starring his Royle Family co-star Ralf Little. From November 2013, Cash narrated the Channel 4 reality show Gogglebox when regular narrator Caroline Aherne was unavailable, and took on the role permanently when Aherne died in July 2016. In 2015 he directed and executive produced the Sky 1 comedy-drama After Hours, starring Jaime Winstone and Ardal O'Hanlon and written by John Osborne and Molly Naylor.

From 2013 to 2017, Cash narrated adverts for sofa company Sofaworks (and its successor Sofology) which featured a three-toed sloth named Neal.

Cash won two BAFTA Television Awards for Best Situation Comedy for his work on the Royle Family in 2000 and 2007.

== Filmography ==
Year	Title	Role	Notes
1997	The Mrs Merton Show	Malcolm Merton	Also co-writer
1998–2000, 2006–2012	The Royle Family	Dave Best	Also co-writer
1999	Mrs Merton and Malcolm	Malcolm Merton	Also co-writer
1999	The Comedy Trail: A Shaggy Dog Story	Dave Best	TV special
2000	Brit Awards 2000	Himself	
2002	Never Mind The Buzzcocks	Himself	
2003–2004	Early Doors	Joe	Also Writer
2004	Comedy Connections	Dave Best	
2007	2007 British Academy Television Awards	Himself	
2008	Sunshine	Bob	Also Writer
2013–present	Gogglebox	Himself (Voice)	Relief Narrator 2013-15; Main Narrator 2016–Present
2015–2019	Gogglesprogs	Himself (Voice)	Relief Narrator 2013-15; Main Narrator 2016–Present
2016	Rovers	Pete	Also Director
2020	Dog Loves Books	Pug (Voice)	

== Personal life ==
Cash is married to Stephanie Davies with whom he has two sons, who appeared in the episode of The Royle Family entitled "The Queen of Sheba".
