= Peter Wight (actor) =

British actor (born 1950)

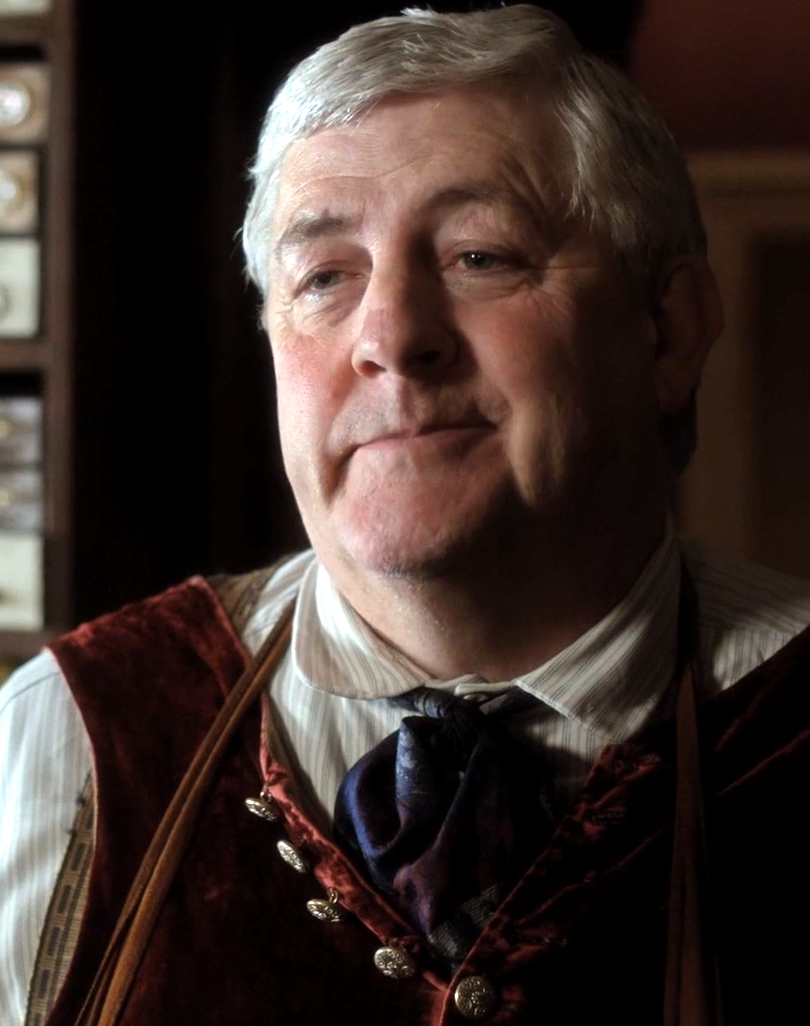
- Wight in The Paradise (2012)
- Born: 1950 (age 75–76); Worthing, Sussex, England
- Occupation: Actor
- Years active: 1978–present

Peter Wight (born 1950), sometimes credited as Peter Wright, is a British actor. He is best known for his role as Policeman Nige in Early Doors (2003–2004).

== Early life ==
Although born in Worthing, Wight grew up in the village of Duffield, Derbyshire, and went to Saint Ralph Sherwin's Roman Catholic Secondary School, before going on to study at the University of Oxford.

== Acting career ==
His television credits include: Our Zoo, Z-Cars, Meantime, Anna Lee, Life on Mars, Holby City, Where the Heart Is, Jane Eyre (1997), Early Doors, Midsomer Murders, Monday Monday, Party Animals, Hit & Miss, The Paradise, The Crown, Brief Encounters and This Time with Alan Partridge. He also appeared in the 2011 miniseries series Case Sensitive and the 2012 series Public Enemies.

Film appearances include Naked, Secrets & Lies, FairyTale: A True Story, Vera Drake, Pride & Prejudice, Babel, All or Nothing, A Bunch of Amateurs, Another Year, Mr. Turner, Hot Fuzz, Persuasion, and Trespass Against Us.

His stage career includes In the Republic of Happiness at the Jerwood Theatre Downstairs at the Royal Court in 2012/13, and in Electra by Sophocles opposite Kristin Scott Thomas and Liz White at the Old Vic Theatre in 2014. He played Will’s father John Shakespeare in the RSC production of Hamnet at Stratford upon Avon between April and June 2023.

== Selected stage credits ==
- In Basidon, Royal Court: Jerwood Downstairs, London, 2012
- In the Republic of Happiness, Royal Court: Jerwood Downstairs, London, 2013
- Trelawny of the Wells, Donmar Warehouse, London, 2013
- Much Ado About Nothing, Old Vic, London, 2013
- Electra, Old Vic, London, 2014
- The Red Lion, National Theatre: Dorfman, London, 2015
- Hamlet, Almeida, London, 2017
- Uncle Vanya, Harold Pinter Theatre, London, 2020
- Hamnet, RSC, Stratford upon Avon, 2023

== Filmography ==
=== Film ===
Year	Title	Role	Notes
1979	The Bitch	Ricky	
1979	Palm Beach	Rupert Roberts	
1987	Personal Services	Detective Gibson	
1993	Naked	Brian	
1996	Secrets & Lies	Father in Family Group	
1997	FairyTale: A True Story	Newspaper Editor	
2000	Shiner	Det. Insp. Grant	
2001	Lucky Break	Officer George Barratt	
2001	The Fourth Angel	M.P.	
2002	The Gathering	Dave Elford	
2003	The Statement	Inspector Cholet	
2004	Vera Drake	Det. Inspector Webster	
2005	Pride & Prejudice	Mr. Gardiner	
2005	Heidi	Pastor	
2005	Lassie	Dr. Jarrett	
2006	Babel	Tom	
2007	Hot Fuzz	Roy Porter	
2007	Flood	Johnson	
2007	Atonement	Police Inspector	
2008	Cass	Cecil	
2008	A Bunch of Amateurs	Mike Bell	
2010	Another Year	Ken	
2010	Clone	Ralph	
2011	Ghosted	Hawkins	
2011	Salmon Fishing in the Yemen	Tory Grandee - Angus Butler	
2011	My Week with Marilyn	Lucy's Father	
2012	Best Laid Plans	Roger	
2012	Hard Boiled Sweets	Jimmy the Gent	
2012	The Casebook of Eddie Brewster	Ray Riddle	
2012	Kon-Tiki	Spinden	
2013	The Look of Love	Police Inspector	
2014	Mr. Turner	Joseph Gillott	
2015	The Program	Sunday Times Editor	
2016	Brakes	Alan	
2016	Trespass Against Us	Dog Owner	
2016	Ethel & Ernest	Detective Sergeant Burnley (voice)	
2017	The Sense of an Ending	Colin Simpson	
2017	Another Mother's Son	Rene	
2018	Only You	Andrew	
2020	Uncle Vanya	Telegin	
2021	Cyrano	Ragueneau	
2025	The Conjuring: Last Rites	Grandpa Smurl	
2026	Tender Loving Care		

=== Television ===
Year	Title	Role	Notes
1978	Armchair Thriller	Operator No.1	Episode: "The Girl Who Walked Quickly: Part 4"
1978	Z-Cars	Traffic PC	Episode: "Quilley on the Spot"
1978	Secret Army	Squadron Leader Kennedy	Episode: "Lucky Piece"
1978	The One and Only Phyllis Dixey	Reporter	Television film
1978	The Sweeney	Jimmy Park	Episode: "Victims"
1979	ITV Playhouse	Jack	Episode: "Where the Heart Is"
1980	Murphy's Stroke	1st Clerk Betting Office	Television film
1980	Minder	Alan	Episode: "All Mod Cons" (uncredited)
1980	The Tumour Principle		Short film
1983	Meantime	Estate Manager	Television film
1983	Two Foolish Men		Short film
1985	Shine On Harvey Moon	Geoff Woodcock	Episode: "Anything Goes…"
1986	The Fourth Floor	Mackie	3 episodes
1986	A Turnip Head's Guide to Alan Parker		Short film
1987	Screen Two	John	Episode: "Will You Love Me Tomorrow"
1987	Yesterday's Dreams	Les	4 episodes
1987	First Sight	Terry	Episode: "Exclusive Yarns"
1987	Chuck Norris: The Man, His Music		Short film
1988	Hard Cases	Brian	3 episodes
1988	Codename: Kyril	Evans	3 episodes
1988	This is David Lander	Peter Partridge	Episode: "Not a Pretty Site"
1988–1993	The Bill	Firearms Instructor/Frank Jennings/Hayward	3 episodes
1991	Sleepers	Village Policeman	Episode: "On the Run"
1992	Casualty	Trevor	Episode: "Will You Still Love Me?"
1992	The Life and Times of Henry Pratt	Tony Preece	2 episodes
1993	Between the Lines	Bernard Gilhoolie	Episode: "Honourable Men"
1994	Anna Lee	Bernard Schiller	5 episodes
1994	Stages	Ben's Father	Episode: "Speaking in Tongues"
1994	Screen One	Frank	Episode: "Meat"
1994	The Return of the Native	Timothy	Television film
1995	Devil's Advocate	Inspector Costello	Television film
1995–1996	Out of the Blue	D.C. Ron Ludlow	12 episodes
1996	A Touch of Frost	Cyril Pearce	Episode: "Fun Times for Swingers"
1996	Hamish Macbeth	Sydney Braithwaite	Episode: "Radio Lochdubh"
1996	Out of This World	Peter Trinder - English Teacher, Dodleston Cheshire 1984	2 episodes
1996	Staying Alive	James Moorhead	2 episodes
1997	Jane Eyre	Clergyman	Television film
1997	Wokenwell	Ted Horrocks	Episode #1.1
1998	Our Mutual Friend	Mr. Wilfer	3 episodes
1999	The Passion	Ron	Television series
2000	The Blind Date	D.I. Harry Jenkins	Television film
2000	In Defence	DCI George Mercer	Episode #1.1
2000	Care	Francis Chambers	Television film
2001	High Stakes	Andrew Weycroft	Episode: "The Big Deal"
2001	Stanley Kubrick Goes Shopping		Short film
2001	Where the Heart Is	Ted Jackson	Episode: "As Time Goes By"
2001	Table 12	John	Episode: "Guess Who's Not Coming to Dinner"
2002	Holby City	Bryan Lake	Episode: "Fathers and Sons"
2002	Ultimate Force	Bill Jackson	Episode: "The Killing House"
2002	Midsomer Murders	Ludlow	Episode: "Murder on St. Malley's Day"
2002	The Project	Neville	Television film
2002	Heartbeat	Len Peters	Episode: "Class Act"
2003	The Second Coming	Chief Superintendent Len Chadwick	2 episodes
2003	3 Blind Mice	Tomlinson	
2003	My Family	Mr. Freeman	Episode: "Return of the Prodigal Prat"
2003	Fortysomething	Nobby	Episode: "Episode #1.1"
2003	Charles II: The Power & the Passion	Ormonde	3 episodes
2003	The Brides in the Bath	Charles Burnham	Television film
2003–2004	Early Doors	Nige	12 episodes
2004	Murphy's Law	Alex Armstrong	Episode: "The Group"
2004	Silent Witness	Lucas Garner	Episode: "Death by Water"
2004	Murder Prevention	Commander Donald Wicker	6 episodes
2005	Uncle Adolf	Heinrich Hoffmann	Television film
2005	The Secret Life of Words	Dullman	Uncredited
2005	Waking the Dead	Donald Hunt	Episode: "Undertow"
2006	Kenneth Williams: Fantabulosa!	Charlie Williams	Television film
2006	Mayo	Ray Carver	Episode: "Scrubbed Out"
2006	EastEnders	Neil	Episode: "11 September 2006"
2007	Life on Mars	Frank Miller	Episode #2.3
2007	Party Animals	George Morgan	8 episodes
2007	Persuasion	Admiral Croft	Television film
2007	Dalziel and Pascoe	Charles Johnson	Episode: "Demons on Our Shoulders"
2007	Frankenstein	DCS Goode	Television film
2008	Lark Rise to Candleford	Old Amos	2 episodes
2008	10 Days to War	Juan Valdes	Episode: "Why This Rush?"
2008	Hotel Babylon	Martin	Episode #3.8
2008	Slapper		Short film
2008	Sunshine	Philip	Episode #1.3
2008	Heartbeat	Bill Budge	Episode: "Strike Up the Band"
2009	Boy Meets Girl	Bill	4 episodes
2009	Monday Monday	Roger	7 episodes
2010	Money	Vince	2 episodes
2010	Pete versus Life	Barry	Episode: "Marriage of Convenience"
2010	New Tricks	Colin Beck	Episode: "Fashion Victim"
2010	Accused	Alan Maxfield	Episode: "Helen's Story"
2011	Silk	Alan Carruthers	Episode 1.4
2011	The Reckoning	Frederick Taylor/Taylor Reith	2 episodes
2011–2012	Case Sensitive	DI Proust	4 episodes
2012	Public Enemies	Ken Whiteley	3 episodes
2012	Titanic	Joseph Rushton	4 episodes
2012	Hit & Miss	Eddie	6 episodes
2012	Room at the Top	Mr. Hoylake	2 episodes
2012	Shakespeare's Wart	Director 1	Short film
2012–2013	The Paradise	Edmund Lovett	13 episodes
2013	The Security Men	Kenneth	Television film
2013–2014	The Mimic	Martin's Dad	4 episodes
2014	Our Zoo	Albert Mottershead	6 episodes
2016	I Want My Wife Back	Don	5 episodes
2016	Brief Encounters	Brian	6 episodes
2016	Domestic Policy		Short film
2016–2017	The Crown	Newspaper Editor	2 episodes
2018	Early Days	Kate's Dad	Short film
2018	Hamlet	Polonius	Television film
2018	Vanity Fair	Mr. Raggles	4 episodes
2019	This Time with Alan Partridge	John Baskell	Episode #1.2
2019	A Confession	Charlie Edwards	6 episodes
2019	The Delivery	George Clements	Short film
2020	Housebound	Clive	2 episodes
2021	Early Doors: Live	Nige	Video
2021	Small World	Harold	Short film
2022	His Dark Materials	Boatman	2 episodes
2023	The Reckoning	Peter Jaconelli	2 episodes
2025	Sister Boniface Mysteries	Arthur Millington	Episode: "Killer Heels"
2026	Sherwood	Eric Bostall	
