= Early Doors =

British TV sitcom (2003–2004)

- Written by: Craig Cash; Phil Mealey
- Directed by: Adrian Shergold (series 1); Craig Cash (series 2)
- Starring: Craig Cash; Phil Mealey; John Henshaw; Christine Bottomley; Susan Cookson; Rita May; Mark Benton; Lorraine Cheshire; James McAvoy; Rodney Litchfield; Maxine Peake
- Theme music composer: Roddy Frame
- Opening theme: "Small World"
- Country of origin: United Kingdom
- Original language: English
- No. of series: 2
- No. of episodes: 12

Production
- Running time: 30 minutes
- Production company: Phil McIntyre Television

Original release
- Network: BBC Two
- Release: 12 May 2003 – 18 October 2004

Early Doors is a BBC sitcom written by Craig Cash and Phil Mealey. Both writers appear in the series, playing the characters Joe and Duffy, who are best friends. Early Doors is set at The Grapes, a small public house in Heaton Norris, a suburb of Stockport, Greater Manchester where daily life revolves around comical issues of love, loneliness and blocked urinals.

== Premise ==
The show is centred on a pub landlord named Ken, his preoccupation with his step-daughter Melanie, who is preparing to meet her real father and his nervous relationship with barmaid Tanya after Ken's wife left him for his best friend. The series reflects some of the Northern humour displayed in The Royle Family (co-written by Cash). In a similar style to The Royle Family, every scene unfolds at The Grapes and it is also set in Greater Manchester. Two series of the show were produced in 2003 and 2004. The series refers to Stockport landmarks, including Houldsworth Square in central Reddish and the McVitie's factory in Heaton Chapel.

== Title ==
The title is a British slang phrase meaning those who arrive earlier than is customary and was often associated with pub customers who wait for or arrive soon after evening opening, around 5:30 p.m. Until the Licensing Act 1988, pubs in England closed in the afternoon. Most are now open all day. It is also widely heard in British football circles and was resuscitated in comments about football. The phrase originates in the practice of British theatres from around 1870 of allowing customers who paid a little extra to enter the theatre early and choose their own seats to beat the rush just before the performance started.

== Characters ==
Ken Dixon
Ken (John Henshaw) is the landlord of The Grapes. He lives in the flat upstairs with his mother (Jean) and stepdaughter (Melanie). Ken is sarcastic and not altogether law-abiding, but sensitive and kind-hearted.
Joe and Duffy
Best mates Joe (Craig Cash) and Nigel (Phil Mealey), who is nicknamed Duffy, are "the lads" of the pub. They are hometown boys who have been friends since childhood. Duffy is a father whose philandering has harmed his marriage.
Janice
In series 1, Janice (Maxine Peake) is the single mother of a newborn baby, Calvin, whom she brings to the pub. Calvin is rumoured to be the result of a one-night stand between Janice and Duffy. Duffy admits to the deed, but denies the possibility that he is father.
Eddie and Joan Bell
Eddie (Mark Benton) and Joan (Lorraine Cheshire) are a boring, simple-minded, but well-meaning couple. Eddie's conversations with Ken are tend to be one-sided, and about topics that interest only Eddie. Joan's elderly mother has numerous pets, including six cats, a dog and a tortoise. Joan and Eddie are intellectually challenged, but they still adore each other after nineteen years of marriage.
Tommy
Tommy (Rodney Litchfield) is a miserable widower who seems to dislike the regulars, and is unreserved in expressing his many complaints. In series 2, he tells the other regulars that he hates his new job because of the "buggers" he works with. (The others soon learn that he is a lollipop man.) He puts his football card winnings into a fund to pay Eddie and Joan's phone bill, after their service is cut off because they can't pay for Joan's calls to her ill mother.
Tanya
Tanya (Susan Cookson) is a part-time barmaid and love interest of Ken. She is best friends with Debbie. She is good-hearted and down to earth and is known for being attractive, which is why it may be surprising that she clearly has feelings for Ken. Halfway through series 2 she informs Ken that she is leaving the pub but in the last episode he asks her to stay and she accepts his offer.
Jean Dixon
Jean (Rita May) is Ken's imposing, manipulative mother. She complains about the greed and laziness of others, yet she seldom leaves her chair, and is usually eating something sweet. (The DVD commentary for series 1 reveals that Jean is the name of writer Craig Cash's mother.)
Winnie Cooper
Winnie (Joan Kempson) cleans The Grapes and the upstairs flat. She is a friend of Jean, and she is well-liked by the Grapes regulars. She often makes comments that she knows will irritate Jean and shares all sorts of gossip with her. She has a son called Darren who has been in trouble several times with the law usually for theft. On the DVD commentary for series 1 it's stated that Winnie is the first name of Phil Mealey's mother.
Melanie Dixon
Melanie (Christine Bottomley) is Ken's stepdaughter and only child. Ken dotes on her, and hopes that she will not abandon him for her biological father, Keith Braithwaite. Melanie sees Ken as her real dad, although she does sometimes exploit his "soft" attitude towards her working hours and free drinks. Her biological father, Keith, starts a fight with Eddie at her 21st birthday. She has had two boyfriends in the series
Liam
Liam (James McAvoy) is Mel's boyfriend in series 1. He is a Scottish student and a smoker.
Dean
Dean (Lee Ingleby) is Mel's boyfriend in series 2. He seems to be liked by Ken, and is a typical jack-the-lad type who generally gets on well with the regulars. Joan may have feelings for Dean.
Debbie
Debbie (Lisa Millett) is a regular at The Grapes, and a good friend to Tanya. She often leaves her kids in the car while she goes in for half a cider. She has cheated on her husband and has "gone with" Duffy rather than walk home. Debbie is possibly not the best mother, behaving neglectfully yet strictly towards her children. She seems to take a liking to Melanie's biological father Keith Braithwate (at least after a few drinks).
Phil and Nige
Phil (James Quinn) and Nige (Peter Wight) are corrupt, and seemingly inept, officers in the local police force, who drink in The Grapes' kitchen.
Keith Braithwaite
Keith (Eamon Boland) is Melanie's estranged biological father. When he visits the Grapes for Melanie's 21st birthday party, he shows himself to have an abrasive personality and a temper.
Nicola
Introduced in series 2, Nicola (Sue McArdle) is Debbie's cousin. She has a sexual encounter in the toilets with Joe.
Bill Cooper
Bill (Johnny Leeze) is Winnie's husband, and a one-time winner of the football card.

== Episodes ==
=== Series 1 ===
| No. overall | No. in series | Title | Directed by | Written by | Original release date |
|---|---|---|---|---|---|
| 1 | 1 | "Opening Time" | Adrian Shergold | Craig Cash, Phil Mealey | 12 May 2003 |
Traffic lights on the corner and cigarettes in the gents are sources of irritation in the Grapes.
| 2 | 2 | "Marital Problems" | Adrian Shergold | Craig Cash, Phil Mealey | 19 May 2003 |
Joe announces that his wife has left him.
| 3 | 3 | "On the Mobile" | Adrian Shergold | Craig Cash, Phil Mealey | 26 May 2003 |
Melanie and Liam's relationship develops.
| 4 | 4 | "Drugs Bust" | Adrian Shergold | Craig Cash, Phil Mealey | 2 June 2003 |
There is a dispute over the football cards game.
| 5 | 5 | "Missing Maltesers" | Adrian Shergold | Craig Cash, Phil Mealey | 9 June 2003 |
Joan and Eddie celebrate their wedding anniversary.
| 6 | 6 | "Breakfast" | Adrian Shergold | Craig Cash, Phil Mealey | 16 June 2003 |
Melanie meets her real father as the pub regulars enjoy their trip to York Races.

=== Series 2 ===
| No. overall | No. in series | Title | Directed by | Written by | Original release date |
|---|---|---|---|---|---|
| 7 | 1 | "Sad News at the Grapes" | Craig Cash | Craig Cash, Phil Mealey | 13 September 2004 |
Phil and Nige sell Ken some forged banknotes.
| 8 | 2 | "Feeling Poorly" | Craig Cash | Craig Cash, Phil Mealey | 20 September 2004 |
The police celebrate a drugs bust in the pub.
| 9 | 3 | "Quiz Night" | Craig Cash | Craig Cash, Phil Mealey | 27 September 2004 |
The Grapes holds a pub quiz.
| 10 | 4 | "Do You Like the Circus?" | Craig Cash | Craig Cash, Phil Mealey | 4 October 2004 |
There is romance between Ken and Tanya.
| 11 | 5 | "Practice" | Craig Cash | Craig Cash, Phil Mealey | 11 October 2004 |
Duffy and Joe discuss their personal lives.
| 12 | 6 | "Part Time" | Craig Cash | Craig Cash, Phil Mealey | 18 October 2004 |
A special guest attends Mel's 21st birthday party

== Production ==
The series has no laughter track which was unusual for sitcoms at that time. There is little diegetic music but the pub regulars often spontaneously sing to each other, such as "Camptown Races" as they leave the pub for the races and "Sex Bomb" on their return. In most episodes a character will say "To the Regiment!" and others will respond "I wish I was there!".

=== Theme music ===
The theme music for the series is "Small World" by Roddy Frame from the 2002 album Surf.

The 2006 Channel 4 documentary Who Killed the British Sitcom used the closing music from Early Doors over its own end credits.

== Live stage show ==
In June 2018, it was announced that Craig Cash and Phil Mealey had been writing Early Doors Live, a stage show based on the series. The show was due to open at The Lowry, Salford in August 2018, before a UK arena tour.

It was said that the show would bring back almost all of the original cast from the TV series, including pub landlord Ken, played by John Henshaw, 13 years on, reflecting many of the changes in the pub world – most noticeably, the smoking ban. Returning cast from the TV series included John Henshaw as Ken, Phil Mealey as Duffy, Craig Cash as Joe, Susan Cookson as Tanya, Lisa Millett as Debbie, Joan Kempson as Winnie, and James Quinn and Peter Wight as policemen Nige and Phil. Also joining the cast were Judith Barker, Vicky Binns, Nick Birkenshaw, Neil Hurst and Laura Woodward.

In January 2019, Early Doors Live won the Manchester Evening News CityLife Award for Best Theatre Production. It was soon followed by the announcement that the live stage show would be returning to The Lowry in the summer of 2019.

== Reception ==
Despite the first series averaging just 1.7 million viewers, it was said to have "scored particularly highly on the appreciation indices". It was noted that BBC Two controller, Jane Root, decided to commission a second series in part "because such a high proportion of viewers enjoyed it." Nancy Banks-Smith, writing in The Guardian, wrote that the series was "such a slow-burning comedy that you only start to smile during the next programme." The show was placed at No. 91 in the 2003–04 Britain's Best Sitcom poll run by the BBC.
