= Nancy Banks-Smith =

British television and radio critic (born 1929)

- Born: 1929 (age 96–97); Manchester, England
- Education: Roedean School
- Occupations: Television and radio critic
- Notable credit: The Guardian

Nancy Banks-Smith (born 1929) is a British television and radio critic, who spent most of her career writing for The Guardian.

== Life and career ==
Born in Manchester and raised in a pub, she was educated at Roedean School.

Banks-Smith began her career in journalism in 1951 as a reporter at the Northern Daily Telegraph. In 1955, after a brief period at the women's section of the Sunday Mirror, she moved to the Daily Herald as a reporter. She worked for the Daily Express from 1960 to 1965 as a feature writer, moving to be a TV critic for The Sun in 1965. She left the newspaper in 1969 when it was bought by Rupert Murdoch.

Banks-Smith began writing for The Guardian in 1970, with her television column becoming a leading feature of the newspaper. She remained with the paper for more than 50 years, though by 2010 she no longer wrote daily reviews. Until 2017, she wrote a monthly column for the paper entitled "A month in Ambridge", reviewing recent developments in the BBC Radio 4 soap opera The Archers.

== Awards ==
In 1970, she was recommended for the Order of the British Empire (OBE), which she declined.
