= List of awards and nominations received by Peter Morgan =

Peter Morgan awards and nominations
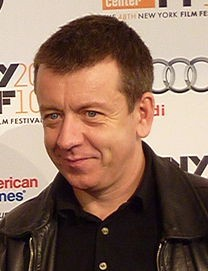
Award	Wins	Nominations
Academy Awards	0	2
BAFTA Awards	5	13
Emmy Awards	3	14
Olivier Awards	0	2
Tony Awards	0	1

Peter Morgan is a British playwright and screenwriter.

He is known for his works on the stage and screen. He often tackles historical events or figures such as Queen Elizabeth II who he has covered extensively in all major mediums. He received numerous accolades including five BAFTA Awards, two Primetime Emmy Awards for Outstanding Drama Series and Outstanding Writing for a Drama Series and four Golden Globe Awards. Morgan has also nominations for two Academy Awards for both Best Original Screenplay and Best Adapted Screenplay for The Queen (2006) and Frost/Nixon (2008) respectively. For his work on the Broadway stage he received a nomination for the Tony Award for Best Play for Frost/Nixon (2005) and for his work on the West End a Laurence Olivier Award for Frost/Nixon and The Audience (2013). For his work on Patriots, in 2023 he won the Critics' Circle Award for Best New Play and received a Laurence Olivier Award nomination. In February 2017, Morgan was awarded a British Film Institute Fellowship, and in November 2019, the American Film Institute honoured him with a tribute to his career at the AFI FEST 2019. In June 2024 he was honoured with the special Creator Award at the 1st Gotham TV Awards for his remarkable creation of The Crown.

== Major associations ==
=== Academy Awards ===
Year	Category	Nominated work	Result	Ref.
2006	Best Original Screenplay	The Queen	Nominated	
2008	Best Adapted Screenplay	Frost/Nixon	Nominated	

=== BAFTA Awards ===
British Academy Film Awards
Year	Category	Nominated work	Result	Ref.
2006	Best Original Screenplay	The Queen	Nominated	
2006	Outstanding British Film	The Queen	Nominated	
2006	Outstanding British Film	The Last King of Scotland	Won	
2006	Best Adapted Screenplay	The Last King of Scotland	Won	
2008	Best Adapted Screenplay	Frost/Nixon	Nominated	
2013	Outstanding British Film	Rush	Nominated	
British Academy Television Awards
2004	Best Single Drama	The Deal	Won	
2007	Best Single Drama	Longford	Nominated	
2007	Best Writer	Longford	Won	
2015	Best Mini Series	The Lost Honour of Christopher Jefferies	Won	
2017	Best Writer for a Drama Series	The Crown	Nominated	
2020	Best Drama Series	The Crown	Nominated	
2021	Best Drama Series	The Crown	Nominated	

=== Emmy Awards ===
Primetime Emmy Award
Year	Category	Nominated work	Result	Ref.
2007	Outstanding Television Movie	Longford	Nominated	
2010	Outstanding Television Movie	The Special Relationship	Nominated	
2010	Outstanding Writing for a Limited Series or TV Movie	The Special Relationship	Nominated	
2017	Outstanding Drama Series	The Crown	Nominated	
2017	Outstanding Writing for a Drama Series – Assassins	The Crown	Nominated	
2018	Outstanding Drama Series	The Crown	Nominated	
2018	Outstanding Writing for a Drama Series – Mystery Man	The Crown	Nominated	
2020	Outstanding Drama Series	The Crown	Nominated	
2020	Outstanding Writing for a Drama Series – Aberfan	The Crown	Nominated	
2021	Outstanding Drama Series	The Crown	Won	
2021	Outstanding Writing for a Drama Series - War	The Crown	Won	
2023	Outstanding Drama Series	The Crown	Nominated	
2024	Outstanding Drama Series	The Crown	Nominated	
2024	Outstanding Writing for a Drama Series - Ritz	The Crown	Nominated	
International Emmy Awards
2003	Best TV Movie or Mini Series	Henry VIII	Won	

=== Golden Globe Awards ===
Year	Category	Nominated work	Result	Ref.
2006	Best Screenplay	The Queen	Won	
2007	Best Miniseries or TV Film	Longford	Won	
2009	Best Screenplay	Frost/Nixon	Nominated	
2016	Best TV Series – Drama	The Crown Season 1	Won	
2017	Best TV Series – Drama	The Crown Season 2	Nominated	
2019	Best TV Series – Drama	The Crown Season 3	Nominated	
2020	Best TV Series – Drama	The Crown Season 4	Won	

=== Laurence Olivier Award ===
Year	Category	Nominated work	Result	Ref.
2007	Best New Play	Frost/Nixon	Nominated	
2013	Best New Play	The Audience	Nominated	
2023	Best New Play	Patriots	Nominated	

=== Tony Award ===
Year	Category	Nominated work	Result	Ref.
2007	Best Play	Frost/Nixon	Nominated	

== Miscellaneous accolades ==
=== AFI Awards ===
Year	Category	Nominated work	Result	Ref.
2016	AFI Television Program of the Year	The Crown – Season One	Won	
2017	AFI Television Program of the Year	The Crown – Season Two	Won	
2019	AFI Television Program of the Year	The Crown – Season Three	Won	
2020	AFI Television Program of the Year	The Crown – Season Four	Won	

=== Critics' Choice Awards ===
Critics' Choice Movie Awards
Year	Category	Nominated work	Result	Ref.
2009	Best Writer	Frost/Nixon	Nominated	
2007	Best Writer	The Queen	Nominated	
Critics' Choice Television Awards
2017	Best Drama Series	The Crown	Nominated	
2018	Best Drama Series	The Crown	Nominated	
2020	Best Drama Series	The Crown	Nominated	
2021	Best Drama Series	The Crown	Won	

=== Gold Derby Awards ===
Year	Category	Nominated work	Result	Ref.
2021	Drama Series	The Crown – Season Four	Nominated	
2021	Drama Episode - Fagan	The Crown – Season Four	Nominated	
2021	Drama Episode - Fairytale	The Crown – Season Four	Nominated	
2021	Drama Episode - Terra Nullius	The Crown – Season Four	Nominated	
2021	Drama Episode - War	The Crown – Season Four	Nominated	

=== Humanitas Prize Awards ===
Year	Category	Nominated work	Result	Ref.
2008	90-Minute Teleplay	Longford	Won	
2024	DramaTeleplay	The Crown (for "Ritz")	Nominated	

=== Producers Guild of America Awards ===
Year	Category	Nominated work	Result	Ref.
2018	Outstanding Producer of Episodic Television, Drama	The Crown – Season Two	Nominated	
2020	Outstanding Producer of Episodic Television, Drama	The Crown – Season Three	Nominated	
2021	Outstanding Producer of Episodic Television, Drama	The Crown – Season Four	Won	

=== Venice Film Festival ===
Year	Category	Nominated work	Result	Ref.
2006	Golden Osella	The Queen	Won	

=== Writers Guild of America Awards ===
Year	Category	Nominated work	Result	Ref.
2018	Drama Series	The Crown – Season Two	Nominated	
2019	Drama Series	The Crown – Season Three	Nominated	
2020	Drama Series	The Crown – Season Four	Won	
