= Boston Society of Film Critics Awards 2006 =

Annual US film awards ceremony

27th BSFC Awards

December 11, 2006

Best Film:
The Departed

The 27th Boston Society of Film Critics Awards, honoring the best in filmmaking in 2006, were given on 11 December 2006.

== Winners ==
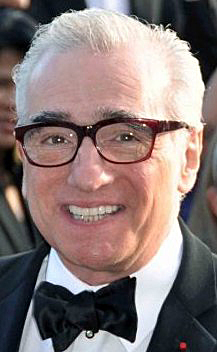
Martin Scorsese, Best Director winner

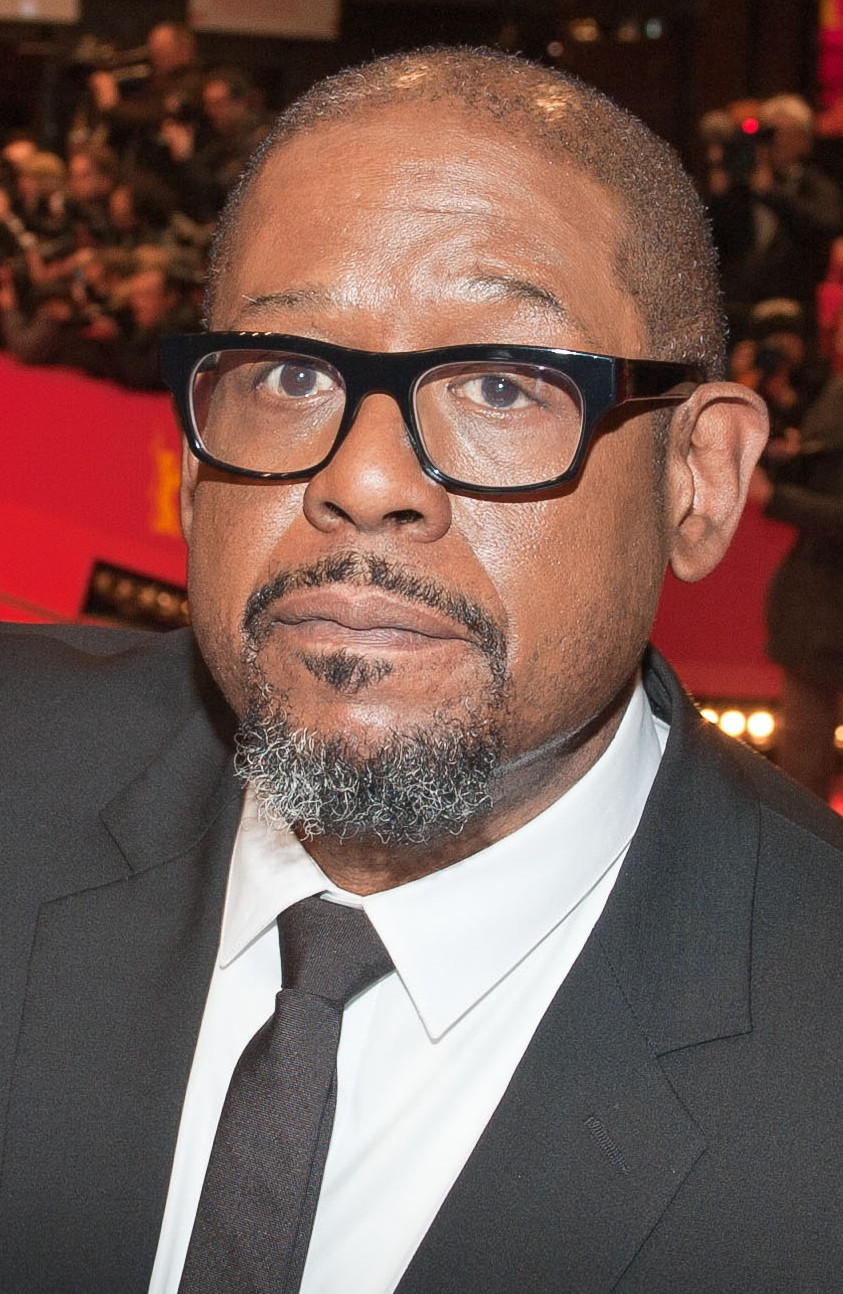
Forest Whitaker, Best Actor winner

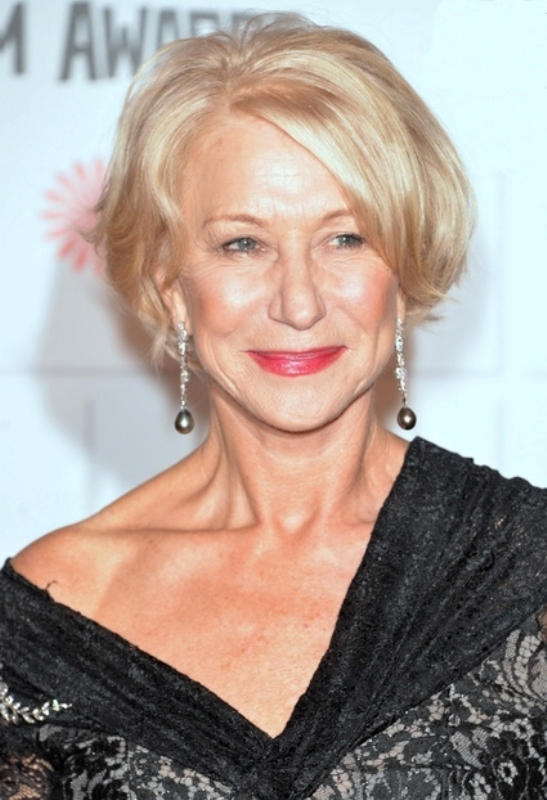
Helen Mirren, Best Actress winner

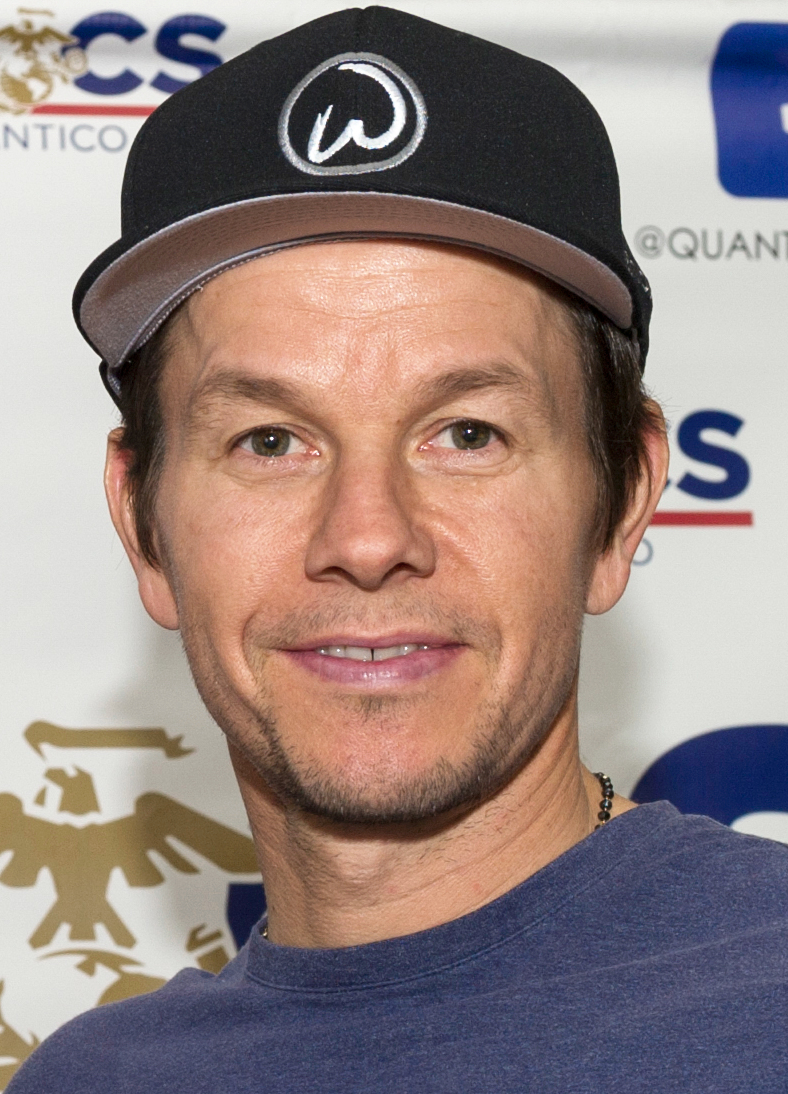
Mark Wahlberg, Best Supporting Actor winner

- Best Film:
  - The Departed
  - Runner-up: United 93
- Best Actor:
  - Forest Whitaker – The Last King of Scotland
  - Runner-up: Ryan Gosling – Half Nelson
- Best Actress:
  - Helen Mirren – The Queen
  - Runner-up: Judi Dench – Notes on a Scandal
- Best Supporting Actor:
  - Mark Wahlberg – The Departed
  - Runner-up (TIE): Alec Baldwin – The Departed, Running with Scissors and The Good Shepherd and Michael Sheen – The Queen
- Best Supporting Actress:
  - Shareeka Epps – Half Nelson
  - Runner-up (TIE): Jennifer Hudson – Dreamgirls and Meryl Streep – The Devil Wears Prada
- Best Director:
  - Martin Scorsese – The Departed
  - Runner-up: Paul Greengrass – United 93
- Best Screenplay:
  - William Monahan – The Departed
  - Runner-up: Peter Morgan – The Queen
- Best Cinematography:
  - Guillermo Navarro – Pan's Labyrinth (El laberinto del fauno)
  - Runner-up (TIE): Stuart Dryburgh – The Painted Veil and Zhao Xiaoding – Curse of the Golden Flower (Man cheng jin dai huang jin jia)
- Best Documentary (TIE):
  - Deliver Us from Evil
  - Shut Up & Sing
  - Runner-up: 51 Birch Street
- Best Foreign-Language Film:
  - Pan's Labyrinth (El laberinto del fauno) • Mexico/Spain/United States
  - Runner-up: Volver • Spain
- Best New Filmmaker:
  - Ryan Fleck – Half Nelson
  - Runner-up: Jonathan Dayton and Valerie Faris – Little Miss Sunshine
- Best Ensemble Cast:
  - United 93
  - Runner-up: The Departed
