= Kananu Kirimi =

Scottish actress

Kananu Kirimi (born 1977) is a British actress.

== Biography ==
Kirimi was born in Nairobi, Kenya, of a Kenyan father and Scottish mother. She was educated at Strathallan School in Perthshire and then took a three-year course at the London Academy of Music and Dramatic Art.

Kirimi's career developed as a classical actor in the theatre taking roles such as Viola in the Royal Shakespeare Company's Twelfth Night and in Adrian Noble's 2002 Pericles, Prince of Tyre. She received a commendation at the 2002 Ian Charleson Awards for her performance in Pericles. In 2004, she played Juliet in the Globe Theatre's first original pronunciation production.

Film credits include the 2006 film The Queen. In 2008, she starred as locum Dr. Joan Makori in the ITV1 drama series The Royal.

== Filmography ==
=== Film ===
Year	Title	Role	Notes
2001	Goodbye, Mr Steadman	WPC	TV film
2003	The Deal	Press Secretary	
2004	Trauma	Carrie	
2005	Ahead of the Class	Beth Mayland	
2006	The Queen	Blair's PA	

=== Television ===
Year	Title	Role	Notes
2002	Rockface	Louise Dryden	Episode 1.5
2004	The Inspector Lynley Mysteries	WPC Mason	
2004-2007	Waking the Dead	Salma Ahmed/Sophie Davis	Episodes – "Deus Ex Machina" (2004), "In Sight of the Lord" (2007)
2007	Sea of Souls	Simone	Episode – "The Prayer Tree Part 1 & 2"
2008	The Royal	Dr Makori	10 episodes
2008	Holby City	Lisa Carson	1 episode – "Pants on Fire"
