= Kidney Cancer UK =

British charity

Kidney Cancer UK logo.

Kidney Cancer UK is a British charity established in 2000 to support "kidney cancer patients, their carers, medical professionals and scientific researchers."

== History ==
The charity was established by the political scientist Keith Taylor after he was diagnosed with kidney and lung cancer in 1998. The television journalist Nicholas Owen has been a patron of the charity since 2003.

In November 2015, Kidney Cancer UK merged into the charity James Whale Fund for Kidney Cancer. The James Whale Fund changed its name to Kidney Cancer UK on 7 February 2016 to become the UK’s leading specialist kidney cancer charity. It seeks to help reduce the harm caused by kidney cancer by increasing knowledge and awareness, providing patient information, and by supporting research into the causes, prevention and treatment of the disease. The charity was founded in 2006 by the broadcaster James Whale whose experience of dealing with the disease in 2000, when he lost a kidney in the process, spurred him on to set up a charity to help others in a similar position. The Fund depends primarily on voluntary donations and in its short history has published a definitive guide to kidney cancer, set up a Patient Support Network and Careline, established an online renal nurse training programme and campaigned for access to life extending drugs for NHS kidney cancer patients. The charity is governed by a board of Trustees and has its head office in Cambridge, UK.
