= London Film Critics Circle Awards 2006 =

British film awards ceremony

27th London Film Critics Circle Awards

8 February 2007

Film of the Year:
United 93

British Film of the Year:
The Queen

The 27th London Film Critics Circle Awards, honouring the best in film for 2006, were announced by the London Film Critics Circle on 8 February 2007.

== Winners and nominees ==
=== Film of the Year ===
United 93

- The Departed
- Little Miss Sunshine
- The Queen
- Volver

=== British Film of the Year ===
The Queen

- Children of Men
- The Last King of Scotland
- Red Road
- The Wind That Shakes the Barley

=== Foreign Language Film of the Year ===
Volver • Spain

- Apocalypto • United States
- Black Book • Netherlands
- The Death of Mr. Lazarescu • Romania
- L'Enfant • Belgium
- Pan's Labyrinth • Mexico

=== Director of the Year ===
Paul Greengrass – United 93

- Pedro Almodóvar – Volver
- Alfonso Cuaron – Children of Men
- Guillermo del Toro – Pan's Labyrinth
- Martin Scorsese – The Departed

=== British Director of the Year ===
Stephen Frears – The Queen

- Andrea Arnold – Red Road
- Ken Loach – The Wind That Shakes the Barley
- Kevin Macdonald – The Last King of Scotland
- Christopher Nolan – The Prestige

=== Screenwriter of the Year ===
Peter Morgan – The Queen

- Dan Futterman – Capote
- Michael Arndt – Little Miss Sunshine
- Guillermo del Toro – Pan's Labyrinth
- Noah Baumbach – The Squid and the Whale

=== Actor of the Year ===
Forest Whitaker – The Last King of Scotland

- Jeff Daniels – The Squid and the Whale
- Richard Griffiths – The History Boys
- Philip Seymour Hoffman – Capote
- David Strathairn – Good Night, and Good Luck

=== Actress of the Year ===
Meryl Streep – The Devil Wears Prada

- Joan Allen – The Upside of Anger
- Penélope Cruz – Volver
- Judi Dench – Notes on a Scandal
- Helen Mirren – The Queen

=== British Actor of the Year ===
Toby Jones – Infamous

- Christian Bale – The Prestige
- Sacha Baron Cohen – Borat
- James McAvoy – The Last King of Scotland
- Timothy Spall – Pierrepoint

=== British Actress of the Year ===
Helen Mirren – The Queen

- Judi Dench – Notes on a Scandal
- Kate Dickie – Red Road
- Lorraine Stanley – London to Brighton
- Kate Winslet – Little Children

=== British Supporting Actor of the Year ===
Michael Caine – The Prestige

- Dominic Cooper – The History Boys
- Eddie Marsan – Pierrepoint
- Bill Nighy – Notes on a Scandal
- Leslie Phillips – Venus

=== British Supporting Actress of the Year ===
Emily Blunt – The Devil Wears Prada

- Helen McCrory – The Queen
- Juliet Stevenson – Pierrepoint
- Emma Thompson – Stranger Than Fiction
- Emily Watson – The Proposition

=== British Newcomer of the Year ===
Andrea Arnold – Red Road

- Clare-Hope Ashitey – Children of Men
- Rebecca Hall – The Prestige
- Jodie Whittaker – Venus
- Paul Andrew Williams – London to Brighton

=== British Producer of the Year ===
Paul Greengrass, Eric Fellner, Tim Bevan – United 93

- Graham King – The Departed
- Lisa Bryer, Andrea Calderwood, Charles Steel – The Last King of Scotland
- Alastair Clark, Ken Marshall, Rachel Robey, Paul Andrew Williams – London to Brighton
- Rebecca O'Brien – The Wind That Shakes the Barley

=== Dilys Powell Award ===
- Leslie Phillips

=== Distinguished Service to the Arts ===
- Helen Mirren
