= Keith Taylor (political scientist) =

British political scientist (1949–2006)

Keith Taylor

Keith Taylor (25 March 1949 – 3 January 2006) was a British political scientist who was an authority on the politics of Utopian socialism, about which he wrote and convened an academic seminar in the 1980s when the area was of little academic interest in Britain. In 2000 he founded Kidney Cancer UK, a support organisation for kidney cancer patients and their carers after he himself was diagnosed with the disease.

== Early life ==
Keith Taylor was born in Manchester on 25 March 1949. He was educated at Manchester Grammar School and read Politics at the University of Kent after which he completed his master's degree at the University of Leicester.

== Career ==
Taylor taught first at Ealing Technical College, then at Coventry Polytechnic (now Coventry University) from 1975 to 1991, and finally at the University of Westminster until he retired in 2002.

He was an authority on the politics of Utopian socialism and in the early 1980s convened a study group on Utopian thought when the area was of little academic interest in Britain. His 1982 book, The political ideas of Utopian socialists, is still regarded as one of the key modern works on the topic. His later book with Barbara Goodwin, The politics of Utopia: A study in theory and practice (1983), looked at the significance of Utopias for political theory and practice and argued that the political function of Utopias was to imaginatively transcend "the ubiquitous, seemingly unassailable present."

== Family ==
Taylor married twice and had one son. His wife Dinah died in 2003.

== Charitable work ==
In January 2000, Taylor founded Kidney Cancer UK, a support organisation for kidney cancer patients and their carers and the first such organisation in Britain. He founded the organisation after he himself was diagnosed with the disease.

== Death ==
Taylor died in Coventry on 3 January 2006.

== Selected publications ==
- Henri Saint Simon 1760-1825: Selected writings on science, industry and social organization. Holmes and Meier, New York, 1975. (Translator and editor) ISBN 0841902127
- The political ideas of Utopian socialists. Cass, London, 1982. ISBN 0714630896
- The politics of Utopia: A study in theory and practice. St. Martin's Press, New York, 1982. (With Barbara Goodwin) (Reissued 2009 with new preface)
- "The micropolitics of medicine: Doctors, patients and their power relations". 2001. (Journal article)
