= Blair–Brown deal =

1994 British political agreement

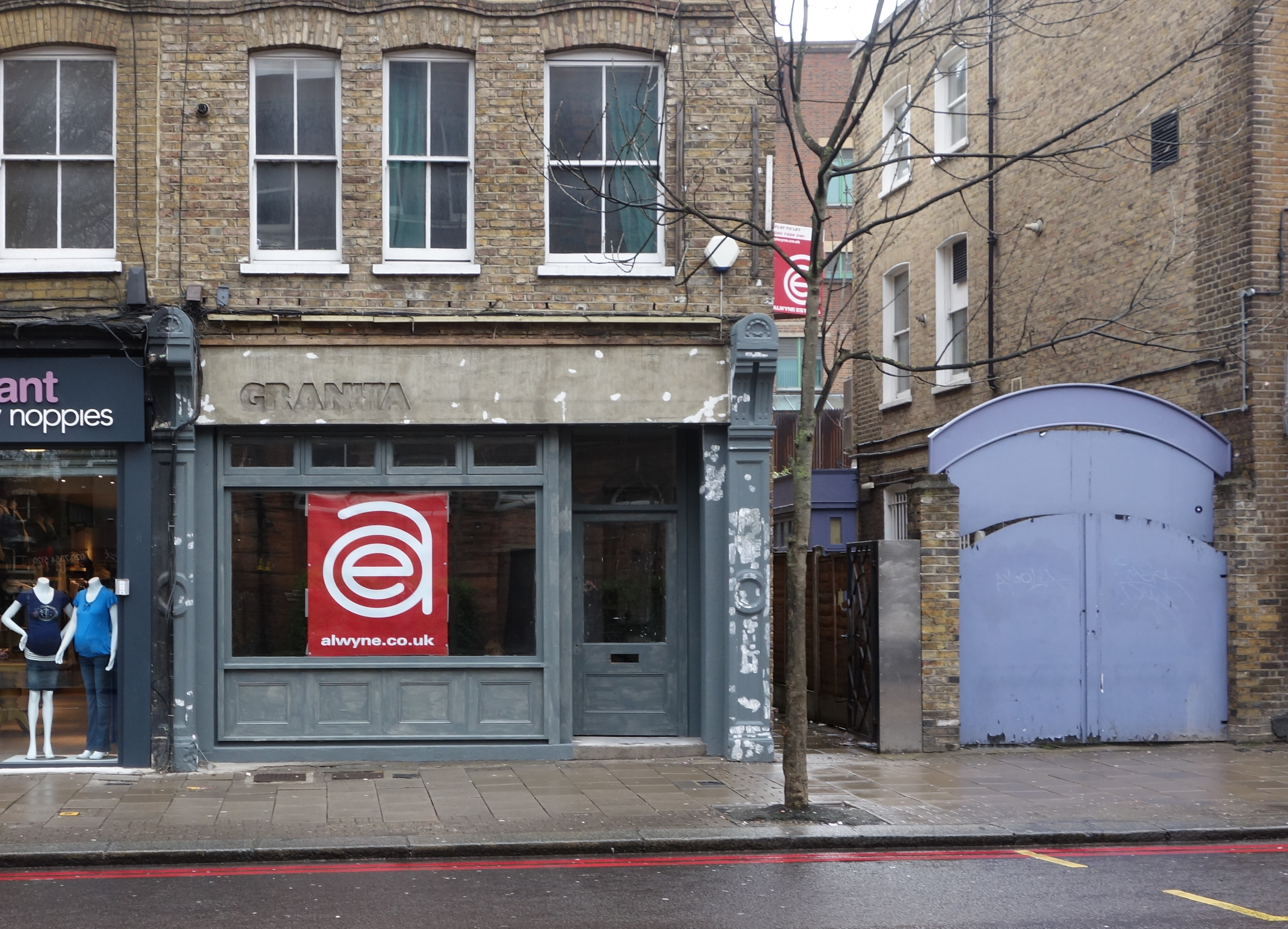
The empty premises of the former Granita restaurant at 127 Upper Street, Islington, where Blair and Brown are believed to have made the deal. Pictured in March 2013.

The Blair–Brown deal (or Granita Pact) was a gentlemen's agreement struck between the British Labour Party politicians Tony Blair and Gordon Brown in 1994, while they were Shadow Home Secretary and Shadow Chancellor of the Exchequer respectively.

The agreement was reached in May 1994 following the unexpected death of Labour leader John Smith. Blair and Brown agreed, in the Granita Deal, that Tony Blair would stand for the leadership of the Labour Party in the upcoming election as the candidate of the progressive reform wing. Gordon Brown initially put his own ambitions for the party leadership aside, giving Tony Blair priority and openly endorsing his candidacy. In return, Blair committed himself to far-reaching concessions to Brown, who, in the event of a Labour election victory, would be granted the office of Chancellor of the Exchequer and largely left in charge of the domestic policy agenda. Blair also hinted that he would not always simply go on and on with his political career, but would cede power to Brown at a certain point and would then support Brown's candidacy.

Following Labour's election victory in 1997, the Labour government was formed in accordance with the previously agreed terms. However, the events following the death of John Smith caused a rupture in the previously close relationship between Blair and Brown. Disagreements between them increasingly arose over the internal distribution of power and domestic policy issues, as well as the precise timing of Blair's transfer of power to Brown.

The existence of the agreement was initially denied by both protagonists but later independently confirmed.

== Blair and Brown: Early years ==
Tony Blair, born in 1953, came from a middle-class family. His father, Leo, had climbed the social ladder; he had joined the Conservative Party in 1947 and aspired to be a candidate for the House of Commons, but suffered a severe stroke when Tony was eleven years old. While Tony Blair had been apolitical at both Fettes College and Oxford, and had dabbled more as a musician and rock promoter, it was at Oxford that he began to discover Christianity, which led him to develop an idealistic interest in community.

While his biographers describe Blair as "curiously rootless" and difficult to classify, Gordon Brown was firmly rooted in the Scottish clergy, the Scottish education system, and subsequently, Scottish politics. Born in Glasgow in 1951, his family moved to Kirkcaldy in Fife when young Gordon was five years old. His father was Church of Scotland minister in the and his children were raised with ideas of Christian socialism. After attending grammar school, young Gordon was admitted to Edinburgh University at the age of 16.

== Deal ==
It is widely believed that the pair had a meeting in 1994 at the restaurant Granita in Islington, London, following the unexpected death of John Smith, the then-Leader of the Labour Party, on 12 May of that year. They agreed that Brown would not stand in the forthcoming Labour leadership election, so as to allow Blair a better chance of an easy victory, and in return Blair would appoint Brown Chancellor of the Exchequer upon Labour's presumptive victory. In government, Brown would be granted unprecedented powers over domestic policy, which would make him the most powerful Chancellor in British history.

It is also widely believed that Blair agreed, if he were appointed Prime Minister, to stay in the job for only two terms and then resign in Brown's favour. Blair led Labour to a landslide victory at the 1997 general election, and Brown became Chancellor with wider powers and the "formidable autonomy" as promised to him. At the 2001 general election, Labour were re-elected to a second consecutive term in government; with strong powerful results similar to the previous poll four years earlier. At the 2005 general election, Labour were returned for a historic third consecutive term in office; albeit with a significantly reduced majority due to gains made from the Conservatives and the Liberal Democrats.

In 2007, as Blair had allegedly predicted, Brown became Blair's successor following Blair's resignation, though he only served for three years. The existence of any deal was denied for many years by both men.

== Disputes ==
The existence of the deal was publicly dismissed by Blair, Brown and many of their associates for several years, prompting much speculation as to what, if anything, was agreed.

The Guardian published a written note in June 2003 which, it said, outlined the policy areas proposed by Brown that Blair would commit to as part of the deal, namely a "fairness agenda" consisting of "social justice, employment opportunities and skills" under a Labour Government.

In October 2003, columnist Tom Brown told the BBC that Brown had informed him of the deal the day after it had been made. Tom Brown said to BBC Radio Scotland:

I'm in absolutely no doubt there was a deal since Gordon phoned me the morning after it was made and told me about it. But at the same time I also believe that both men left the restaurant with a different version of the deal in their minds. They hadn't actually written it down on paper. Gordon believed Blair would step down about now actually, and Blair believed that he... hadn't committed himself to any timetable.

An episode of Dispatches in May 2007, entitled "Gordon Brown: Fit For Office?" reported that Brown felt betrayed after losing support from Peter Mandelson and other friends and that this lack of support, rather than any deal, made him decide not to run for the leadership.

An account of the pact between the two politicians was presented in detail in the book of 2001, The Rivals: The Intimate Story of a Political Marriage, written by BBC journalist James Naughtie.

The relationship between Blair and Brown from the years 1983 to 1994 – culminating in an in depth dramatisation of the Granita meeting – was the focus of a 2003 made-for-television film directed by Stephen Frears and written by Peter Morgan, based in part upon Naughtie's book. The film, titled The Deal, starred Michael Sheen as Blair and David Morrissey as Brown.

A caption in the opening titles (directly inspired – according to Frears – by the identical epigraph at the start of the film of 1969, Butch Cassidy and the Sundance Kid) informed viewers that "much of what follows is true".

== Location ==
In a televised interview with Piers Morgan in February 2010, Brown admitted that he deferred contesting the Labour leadership and that Blair had promised to hand over power to him at a later point, but that the two men later fought bitterly after – from Brown's perspective – Blair failed to keep to his end of the bargain. Brown also stated that the deal had not been made in Granita but had been struck before the men met in the restaurant. In his 2017 book My Life, Our Times, Brown again described the Granita dinner as "a formality" that merely confirmed what the two had previously discussed and agreed.

In her autobiography, Cherie Blair writes that the deal took place at a neighbour's home, not at Granita. In an interview with Peter Hennessy on BBC Radio 4, Tony Blair claimed that the agreement had been struck '...in a couple of different places in Edinburgh', claiming that by the time they dined at Granita, minds had been made up as to what was going to happen.

== See also ==
- Kirribilli agreement – a similar pact in Australian politics
- Premiership of Tony Blair
- Premiership of Gordon Brown
- The Deal (2003 film) – a dramatisation of the events
