= New York Film Critics Online Award for Best Director =

The New York Film Critics Online Award for Best Director is an award given annually by the New York Film Critics Online. It was first introduced in 2001.

== Winners ==
=== 2000s ===
Year	Winner(s)	Film
2001	David Lynch	Mulholland Drive
2002	Todd Haynes	Far from Heaven
2002	Martin Scorsese	Gangs of New York
2003	Sofia Coppola	Lost in Translation
2004	Martin Scorsese	The Aviator
2005	Fernando Meirelles	The Constant Gardener
2006	Stephen Frears	The Queen
2007	Paul Thomas Anderson	There Will Be Blood
2008	Danny Boyle	Slumdog Millionaire
2009	Kathryn Bigelow	The Hurt Locker

=== 2010s ===
Year	Winner	Film
2010	David Fincher	The Social Network
2011	Michel Hazanavicius	The Artist
2012	Kathryn Bigelow	Zero Dark Thirty
2013	Alfonso Cuarón	Gravity
2014	Richard Linklater	Boyhood
2015	Tom McCarthy	Spotlight
2016	Barry Jenkins	Moonlight
2017	Dee Rees	Mudbound
2018	Alfonso Cuarón	Roma
2019	Bong Joon-ho	Parasite

== Multiple winners ==
2 wins

- Kathryn Bigelow (2009, 2012)
- Alfonso Cuarón (2013, 2018)
- Martin Scorsese (2002, 2004)

== See also ==
- Los Angeles Film Critics Association Award for Best Director
- National Board of Review Award for Best Director
- New York Film Critics Circle Award for Best Director
- National Society of Film Critics Award for Best Director
