= The Queen (2006 film) =

2006 film by Stephen Frears

- British theatrical release poster
- Directed by: Stephen Frears
- Written by: Peter Morgan
- Produced by: Andy Harries; Christine Langan; Tracey Seaward
- Starring: Helen Mirren; Michael Sheen; James Cromwell; Helen McCrory; Alex Jennings; Roger Allam; Sylvia Syms
- Cinematography: Affonso Beato
- Edited by: Lucia Zucchetti
- Music by: Alexandre Desplat
- Production companies: Pathé Renn Production; Granada Productions; BIM Distribuzione; France 3 Cinéma; Canal+
- Distributed by: Pathé Distribution (France, Switzerland & United Kingdom); BIM Distribuzione (Italy)
- Release dates: 2 September 2006 (Venice); 15 September 2006 (United Kingdom); 18 October 2006 (France)
- Running time: 103 minutes
- Countries: United Kingdom; France; Italy
- Language: English
- Budget: $15 million
- Box office: $123.5 million

The Queen is a 2006 docudrama film directed by Stephen Frears and written by Peter Morgan. The film depicts the death of Diana, Princess of Wales in 1997. The royal family regards Diana's death as a private affair and thus not to be treated as an official royal death, in contrast with the views of prime minister Tony Blair and Diana's ex-husband, Prince Charles, who favour the general public's desire for an official expression of grief. Matters are further complicated by the media, royal protocol regarding Diana's official status and wider issues about republicanism.

The film's development coincided with a revival of favourable public sentiment in respect to the British monarchy, a downturn in fortunes for Blair, and the inquest into Diana's death, Operation Paget. Michael Sheen reprised his role as Blair from The Deal, and he would do so again in The Special Relationship.

The Queen garnered widespread critical and popular acclaim for Helen Mirren playing the title role of Elizabeth II, for which Mirren won the Academy Award for Best Actress. Mirren was praised by the Queen herself and was invited to dinner at Buckingham Palace. However, Mirren declined to attend due to filming commitments in Hollywood.

== Plot ==
The 1997 United Kingdom general election has Tony Blair and the Labour Party elected on a manifesto of reform and modernisation. Less than four months later, Diana, Princess of Wales is killed in a car crash at the Alma Bridge tunnel in Paris.

Immediately, her death presents problems for her former husband, Prince Charles, and the prime minister, Tony Blair, what to accord the mother of a future king who is no longer a member of the royal family. Queen Elizabeth II wonders if Blair will turn his modernisation pledge on to the royal family, since he attempts to have her reconsider her views on the funeral plans. Diana's family, the Spencers, calls for the funeral to be private.

Following a speech in which Blair describes Diana as the "People's Princess" and the adoption of the title by the press, an outpouring of grief by the general public begins in broadcasts and displays of floral tributes so numerous at Buckingham and Kensington Palaces that the main entrances onto the complexes have to be rerouted. The royal family's senior members make no effort to acknowledge Diana's significance to society as the Queen feels that she must comfort and shield her grandsons following the death of their mother, and so remains on holiday at Balmoral. The royal family's popularity plummets, while Blair's approval rises as he responds to the public outcry of the royal family's inaction.

Blair's attempts to guide the royal family through the controversy are met with resistance: the Queen describes them as a surrender to public hysteria. Despite the Queen and Prince Philip's shared indignation for any sympathy toward Diana or acknowledgment of the country's mourning, Blair is encouraged by the private secretaries of both the Prince of Wales and the Queen to continue with his attempts to change the attitude of the royal family. As Britain continues its outpouring of grief, Blair attempts to defend the royal family publicly, but his attempts are futile. Blair's compassion earns him overwhelming praise and adoration, while the royal family's seeming indifference earns them fiery condemnation from the people.

As Britain's outrage hits a critical mass, Blair cannot continue to finesse the Queen's refusal to acknowledge Diana and the public. He reveals to her that 70% of the country believes her actions are damaging to the monarchy and "1 in 4" people are in favour of abolishing the monarchy altogether. Blair adamantly insists that the royal family fly the flag at Buckingham Palace at half-mast, that the Queen pay her respects to Diana and give a public address consoling the country.

Although she is demoralised by the country's reaction and the prime minister's suggestions, the Queen comes to realise that the world has changed during her reign. She and Prince Philip return to London despite their disagreement. The Queen finally pays public tribute on live television to Diana's significance to the nation and society and can somewhat quell Britain's agony. The royal family attends the public funeral for Diana at Westminster Abbey.

At Blair's next meeting with the Queen, they exchange views about what has happened since their last meeting, including the controversy surrounding Diana's death and the actions that followed. Then she cautions the prime minister that, just as public opinion has changed about how the royal family should react to a new Britain, so must he as he may very well find himself in the same position of changing public opinion.

== Cast ==
- Helen Mirren as Queen Elizabeth II
- Michael Sheen as Tony Blair
- James Cromwell as Prince Philip, Duke of Edinburgh
- Helen McCrory as Cherie Blair
- Alex Jennings as Charles, Prince of Wales
- Roger Allam as Robin Janvrin
- Sylvia Syms as Queen Elizabeth the Queen Mother
- Tim McMullan as Stephen Lamport
- Mark Bazeley as Alastair Campbell
- Michel Gay as Dodi Fayed
- Douglas Reith as Lord Airlie
- Kananu Kirimi as Blair's PA
- Julian Firth as Blair's aide
- Earl Cameron as the portrait artist
- Elliot Levey as the TV director

The film uses archival footage of Diana, Princess of Wales, Camilla Parker Bowles, Nicholas Owen, Julia Somerville, Martyn Lewis, Trevor McDonald and John Suchet.

== Production ==
=== Filming ===
The screenplay was written by Peter Morgan. It was produced by Pathé Pictures and Granada Productions (ITV Productions). Stephen Frears had a clause in his contract from The Deal that allowed him to direct any follow-ups or sequels, and he was officially announced as director in September 2003. The film was shot on location in England in London, Halton House and Waddesdon Manor, in Buckinghamshire, Brocket Hall in Hertfordshire; and in Scotland at Balmoral Castle, Castle Fraser and Cluny Castle in Aberdeenshire, and Blairquhan Castle and Culzean Castle in South Ayrshire.

=== Set design ===
The sets were designed by Alan MacDonald, which won him Best Art Direction in a Contemporary Film from the Art Directors Guild and Best Technical Achievement at the British Independent Film Awards.

=== Portraying the Queen ===
Mirren says transforming herself into the Queen came almost naturally after the wig and glasses, since she shares her resting facial expression — a slightly downturned mouth — with the monarch. She regularly reviewed film and video footage of Elizabeth and kept photographs in her trailer during production. She also undertook extensive voice coaching, faithfully reproducing the Queen's delivery of her televised speech to the world. Morgan has said that her performance was so convincing that, by the end of production, crew members who had been accustomed to slouching or relaxing when they addressed her were standing straight up and respectfully folding their hands behind their backs. Mirren arranged to spend time off-camera with the supporting cast playing other members of the Royal Family, including James Cromwell, Alex Jennings and Sylvia Syms so they would be as comfortable with each other as a real family.

To enhance the contrast of their different worlds, shots involving the Queen were taken in 35mm film and those of Tony Blair in 16mm film.

=== Television viewership and home media ===
ITV's role in the production of the film allowed them an option for its television premiere and it was broadcast on 2 September 2007 (coinciding that weekend with a memorial service to Diana) to an average audience of 7.9 million, winning its timeslot. The DVD was released in the UK on 12 March 2007. Special features include a making-of featurette and an audio commentary by Stephen Frears, writer Peter Morgan and Robert Lacey, biographer of Queen Elizabeth II. It was released on Blu-ray and DVD in the USA on 24 April 2007 and, as of 2013, US DVD sales had exceeded $29 million.

=== Historical accuracy ===
Some aspects of the characters are known to be true to their real-life counterparts. According to Morgan, "cabbage" is an actual term of endearment Philip used for his wife (mon chou – "my cabbage" – is a standard affectionate nickname in French).

Other elements represent characteristics associated with people depicted. The electric guitar seen behind Blair in his personal office is a reference to his past membership in the band Ugly Rumours while a student. The Newcastle United football jersey he wears to a family breakfast is a reference to his support of that team. The film also shows Alastair Campbell coining the term "The People's Princess" but, in 2007, he revealed that it was Tony Blair who came up with it.

A notable inaccuracy is that Robin Janvrin is represented as the Queen's private secretary during the aftermath of Diana's death. In fact, that position was then occupied by Janvrin's predecessor, Sir Robert Fellowes; Janvrin was the deputy private secretary until 1999. However, the film is accurate in depicting Janvrin as the person who delivered the news of Diana's accident to the Queen at Balmoral during the night. The change may have been made to avoid confusing the audience by depicting the complicated family relationships involved— Fellowes was, in fact, also Diana's brother-in-law (by his marriage to her sister, Lady Jane Fellowes) and is a first cousin of Sarah Ferguson.

== Reception ==
=== Box office ===
The film exceeded box-office expectations; with a budget of $15 million the film earned $56.4 million in the United States and Canada.

=== Critical response ===
On the review aggregator website Rotten Tomatoes, the film holds an approval rating of 97%, based on 202 reviews, with an average rating of 8.7/10. The website's critical consensus reads, "Full of wit, humour and pathos, Stephen Frears' moving portrait looks at life of the British royals during the period after Princess Diana's death." On Metacritic, the film has a weighted average score of 90 out of 100, based on 38 critics, indicating "universal acclaim".

Before the film was released, critics praised both Stephen Frears and Peter Morgan, who later received Golden Globe and Academy Award nominations for Best Director and Best Screenplay. Michael Sheen's performance as Tony Blair earned him particular acclaim. Helen Mirren's portrayal, which garnered her acclaim from critics around the world, made her a favourite for the Academy Award for Best Actress well before the film was released in cinemas. After its showing at the Venice Film Festival, Mirren received a five minute-long standing ovation. Roger Ebert came out of recovery from surgery to give the film a review, in which he called it "spellbinding" and gave it four out of four stars.

Amongst the few negative reviews, Slant Magazine's Nick Schager criticised the insider portraiture of the film as "somewhat less than revelatory, in part because Morgan's script succumbs to cutie-pie jokiness [...] and broad caricature", mentioning particularly "James Cromwell's Prince Philip, who envisions the crowned heads as exiled victims and the gathering crowds as encroaching 'Zulus'".

=== Accolades ===
Mirren won Best Actress at the Academy Awards, British Academy Film Awards, Critics' Choice Movie Awards, Golden Globe Awards and the Screen Actors Guild Awards. Mirren also won awards from the Boston Society of Film Critics, the Los Angeles Film Critics Association, the National Board of Review, the National Society of Film Critics, the New York Film Critics Circle, the Washington D.C. Area Film Critics Association and many other awards of which are listed below, except that she was nominated for at least three more. In most of her acceptance speeches, she expressed her admiration for the real Queen, and dedicated both her Golden Globe and her Oscar to Elizabeth II.

As of 2022, Mirren from The Queen and Forest Whitaker from The Last King of Scotland are the only lead performers to achieve "The Big Four" critics awards (LAFCA, NBR NYFCC, NSFC) as well as win the Oscar, BAFTA, Critics' Choice, Golden Globe and SAG awards in the same year.

Award	Category	Nominee(s)	Result	Ref.
AARP Movies for Grown-ups Awards	Best Movie for Grownups		Nominated	
AARP Movies for Grown-ups Awards	Best Director	Stephen Frears	Nominated	
AARP Movies for Grown-ups Awards	Best Actress	Helen Mirren	Won	
Academy Awards	Best Picture	Andy Harries, Christine Langan, and Tracey Seaward	Nominated	
Academy Awards	Best Director	Stephen Frears	Nominated	
Academy Awards	Best Actress	Helen Mirren	Won	
Academy Awards	Best Original Screenplay	Peter Morgan	Nominated	
Academy Awards	Best Costume Design	Consolata Boyle	Nominated	
Academy Awards	Best Original Score	Alexandre Desplat	Nominated	
African-American Film Critics Association Awards	Best Actress	Helen Mirren	Won	
Alliance of Women Film Journalists Awards	Best Picture	Stephen Frears	Won	
Alliance of Women Film Journalists Awards	Best Drama by or About Women	Stephen Frears	Nominated	
Alliance of Women Film Journalists Awards	Best Actress in a Dramatic Performance	Helen Mirren	Won	
American Cinema Editors Awards	Best Edited Feature Film – Dramatic	Lucia Zucchetti	Nominated	
Art Directors Guild Awards	Excellence in Production Design for a Contemporary Film	Alan MacDonald, Peter Wenham, Ben Smith, Katie Buckley, Tim Monroe, and Franck Schwartz	Nominated	
Austin Film Critics Association Awards	Top Ten Films		7th Place	
Awards Circuit Community Awards	Best Actress in a Leading Role	Helen Mirren	Won	
Awards Circuit Community Awards	Best Original Screenplay	Peter Morgan	Nominated	
BMI Film & TV Awards	Film Music Award	Alexandre Desplat	Won	
Bodil Awards	Best Non-American Film	Stephen Frears	Nominated	
Boston Society of Film Critics Awards	Best Actress	Helen Mirren	Won	
Boston Society of Film Critics Awards	Best Supporting Actor	Michael Sheen	Runner-up	
Boston Society of Film Critics Awards	Best Screenplay	Peter Morgan	Runner-up	
British Academy Film Awards	Best Film	Andy Harries, Christine Langan, and Tracey Seaward	Won	
British Academy Film Awards	Outstanding British Film	Andy Harries, Christine Langan, Tracey Seaward, Stephen Frears, and Peter Morgan	Nominated	
British Academy Film Awards	Best Direction	Stephen Frears	Nominated	
British Academy Film Awards	Best Actress in a Leading Role	Helen Mirren	Won	
British Academy Film Awards	Best Actor in a Supporting Role	Michael Sheen	Nominated	
British Academy Film Awards	Best Original Screenplay	Peter Morgan	Nominated	
British Academy Film Awards	Best Costume Design	Consolata Boyle	Nominated	
British Academy Film Awards	Best Editing	Lucia Zucchetti	Nominated	
British Academy Film Awards	Best Makeup and Hair	Daniel Phillips	Nominated	
British Academy Film Awards	Best Original Music	Alexandre Desplat	Nominated	
British Independent Film Awards	Best British Independent Film		Nominated	
British Independent Film Awards	Best Director	Stephen Frears	Nominated	
British Independent Film Awards	Best Actress	Helen Mirren	Nominated	
British Independent Film Awards	Best Screenplay	Peter Morgan	Won	
British Independent Film Awards	Best Technical Achievement	Alan MacDonald (for production design)	Nominated	
British Independent Film Awards	Best Technical Achievement	Daniel Phillips (for makeup)	Nominated	
Camerimage	Golden Frog (Main Competition)	Affonso Beato	Nominated	
Central Ohio Film Critics Association Awards	Best Actress	Helen Mirren	Won	
César Awards	Best Foreign Film	Stephen Frears	Nominated	
Chicago Film Critics Association Awards	Best Picture		Nominated	
Chicago Film Critics Association Awards	Best Director	Stephen Frears	Nominated	
Chicago Film Critics Association Awards	Best Actress	Helen Mirren	Won	
Chicago Film Critics Association Awards	Best Supporting Actor	Michael Sheen	Nominated	
Chicago Film Critics Association Awards	Best Original Screenplay	Peter Morgan	Won	
Chicago Film Critics Association Awards	Best Original Score	Alexandre Desplat	Nominated	
Chicago International Film Festival	Audience Choice Award	Stephen Frears	Won	
Costume Designers Guild Awards	Excellence in Contemporary Film	Consolata Boyle	Won	
Critics' Choice Movie Awards	Best Picture		Nominated	
Critics' Choice Movie Awards	Best Director	Stephen Frears	Nominated	
Critics' Choice Movie Awards	Best Actress	Helen Mirren	Won	
Critics' Choice Movie Awards	Best Writer	Peter Morgan	Nominated	
Dallas-Fort Worth Film Critics Association Awards	Top 10 Films		4th Place	
Dallas-Fort Worth Film Critics Association Awards	Best Film		Nominated	
Dallas-Fort Worth Film Critics Association Awards	Best Director	Stephen Frears	Nominated	
Dallas-Fort Worth Film Critics Association Awards	Best Actress	Helen Mirren	Won	
Dallas-Fort Worth Film Critics Association Awards	Best Supporting Actor	Michael Sheen	Nominated	
David di Donatello Awards	Best European Film	Stephen Frears	Nominated	
Directors Guild of America Awards	Outstanding Directorial Achievement in Motion Pictures	Stephen Frears	Nominated	
Dublin Film Critics Circle Awards	Best Actress	Helen Mirren	Nominated	
Empire Awards	Best British Film		Nominated	
Empire Awards	Best Actress	Helen Mirren	Nominated	
European Film Awards	European Film		Nominated	
European Film Awards	European Director	Stephen Frears	Nominated	
European Film Awards	European Actress	Helen Mirren	Won	
European Film Awards	European Screenwriter	Peter Morgan	Nominated	
European Film Awards	European Composer	Alexandre Desplat	Won	
European Film Awards	Prix d'Excellence	Lucia Zucchetti (for editing)	Nominated	
European Film Awards	People's Choice Award		Nominated	
Evening Standard British Film Awards	Best Screenplay	Peter Morgan (also for The Last King of Scotland)	Won	
Florida Film Critics Circle Awards	Best Actress	Helen Mirren	Won	
Gold Derby Film Awards	Best Lead Actress	Helen Mirren	Won	
Gold Derby Film Awards	Best Supporting Actor	Michael Sheen	Won	
Gold Derby Film Awards	Best Original Screenplay	Peter Morgan	Nominated	
Gold Derby Film Awards	Best Costume Design	Consolata Boyle	Nominated	
Gold Derby Film Awards	Best Makeup/Hair	Daniel Phillips	Nominated	
Gold Derby Film Awards	Best Original Music	Alexandre Desplat	Nominated	
Golden Eagle Awards	Best Foreign Language Film	Stephen Frears	Won	
Golden Globe Awards	Best Motion Picture – Drama		Nominated	
Golden Globe Awards	Best Actress in a Motion Picture – Drama	Helen Mirren	Won	
Golden Globe Awards	Best Director – Motion Picture	Stephen Frears	Nominated	
Golden Globe Awards	Best Screenplay – Motion Picture	Peter Morgan	Won	
Golden Schmoes Awards	Actress of the Year	Helen Mirren	Nominated	
Goya Awards	Best European Film	Stephen Frears	Won	
IndieWire Critics Poll	Best Lead Performance	Helen Mirren	Won	
IndieWire Critics Poll	Best Supporting Performance	Michael Sheen	9th Place	
IndieWire Critics Poll	Best Screenplay	Peter Morgan	Won	
International Cinephile Society Awards	Best Picture		5th Place	
International Cinephile Society Awards	Best Actress	Helen Mirren	Won	
International Cinephile Society Awards	Best Supporting Actor	Michael Sheen	Won	
International Cinephile Society Awards	Best Original Screenplay	Peter Morgan	Won	
International Cinephile Society Awards	Best Original Score	Alexandre Desplat (also for The Painted Veil)	Won	
International Film Music Critics Association Awards	Best Original Score for a Drama Film	Alexandre Desplat	Nominated	
International Online Cinema Awards	Best Actress	Helen Mirren	Won	
International Online Cinema Awards	Best Supporting Actor	Michael Sheen	Nominated	
International Online Cinema Awards	Best Original Screenplay	Peter Morgan	Won	
International Online Cinema Awards	Best Original Score	Alexandre Desplat	Nominated	
Iowa Film Critics Awards	Best Actress	style="background: #9EFF9E; color: #000; vertical-align: middle; text-align: center; " class="yes table-yes2 notheme"|Won		
Irish Film & Television Awards	Best Costume Design	Consolata Boyle	Won	
Irish Film & Television Awards	Best International Actress (People's Choice Award)	Helen Mirren	Won	
Italian Online Movie Awards	Best Actress	Helen Mirren	Won	
Italian Online Movie Awards	Best Original Screenplay	Peter Morgan	Nominated	
Kansas City Film Critics Circle Awards	Best Actress	Helen Mirren	Won	
Kansas City Film Critics Circle Awards	Best Supporting Actor	Michael Sheen	Won	
Las Vegas Film Critics Society Awards	Best Picture		9th Place	
Las Vegas Film Critics Society Awards	Best Actress	Helen Mirren	Won	
London Film Critics Circle Awards	Film of the Year		Nominated	
London Film Critics Circle Awards	British Film of the Year		Won	
London Film Critics Circle Awards	British Director of the Year	Stephen Frears	Won	
London Film Critics Circle Awards	Actress of the Year	Helen Mirren	Nominated	
London Film Critics Circle Awards	British Actress of the Year	Helen Mirren	Won	
London Film Critics Circle Awards	British Supporting Actress of the Year	Helen McCrory	Nominated	
London Film Critics Circle Awards	Screenwriter of the Year	Peter Morgan	Won	
Los Angeles Film Critics Association Awards	Best Picture		Runner-up	
Los Angeles Film Critics Association Awards	Best Actress	Helen Mirren	Won	
Los Angeles Film Critics Association Awards	Best Supporting Actor	Michael Sheen	Won	
Los Angeles Film Critics Association Awards	Best Screenplay	Peter Morgan	Won	
Los Angeles Film Critics Association Awards	Best Music	Alexandre Desplat (also for The Painted Veil)	Won	
Movieguide Awards	Best Movie for Mature Audiences		Won	
Nastro d'Argento	Best European Director	Stephen Frears	Nominated	
National Board of Review Awards	Best Actress	Helen Mirren	Won	
National Society of Film Critics Awards	Best Actress	Helen Mirren	Won	
National Society of Film Critics Awards	Best Screenplay	Peter Morgan	Won	
New York Film Critics Circle Awards	Best Film		Runner-up	
New York Film Critics Circle Awards	Best Director	Stephen Frears	Runner-up	
New York Film Critics Circle Awards	Best Actress	Helen Mirren	Won	
New York Film Critics Circle Awards	Best Screenplay	Peter Morgan	Won	
New York Film Critics Online Awards	Top 10 Films		Won	
New York Film Critics Online Awards	Best Film		Won	
New York Film Critics Online Awards	Best Director	Stephen Frears	Won	
New York Film Critics Online Awards	Best Actress	Helen Mirren	Won	
New York Film Critics Online Awards	Best Supporting Actor	Michael Sheen	Won	
New York Film Critics Online Awards	Best Screenplay	Peter Morgan	Won	
Oklahoma Film Critics Circle Awards	Top Ten Films		Won	
Oklahoma Film Critics Circle Awards	Best Actress	Helen Mirren	Won	
Online Film & Television Association Awards	Best Picture		Nominated	
Online Film & Television Association Awards	Best Director	Stephen Frears	Nominated	
Online Film & Television Association Awards	Best Actress	Helen Mirren	Won	
Online Film & Television Association Awards	Best Supporting Actor	Michael Sheen	Nominated	
Online Film & Television Association Awards	Best Breakthrough Performance: Male	Michael Sheen	Won	
Online Film & Television Association Awards	Best Original Screenplay	Peter Morgan	Won	
Online Film & Television Association Awards	Best Ensemble		Nominated	
Online Film & Television Association Awards	Best Casting		Nominated	
Online Film & Television Association Awards	Best Costume Design		Nominated	
Online Film & Television Association Awards	Best Makeup and Hairstyling		Nominated	
Online Film Critics Society Awards	Best Actress	Helen Mirren	Won	
Online Film Critics Society Awards	Best Original Screenplay	Peter Morgan	Nominated	
Phoenix Film Critics Society Awards	Best Actress in a Leading Role	Helen Mirren	Won	
Polish Film Awards	Best European Film	Stephen Frears	Nominated	
Political Film Society Awards	Democracy		Nominated	
Political Film Society Awards	Exposé		Nominated	
Producers Guild of America Awards	Outstanding Producer of Theatrical Motion Pictures	Andy Harries, Christine Langan, and Tracey Seaward	Nominated	
Robert Awards	Best Non-American Film	Stephen Frears	Nominated	
San Diego Film Critics Society Awards	Best Actress	Helen Mirren	Won	
San Francisco Film Critics Circle Awards	Best Actress	Helen Mirren	Won	
Santa Barbara International Film Festival	Outstanding Performer of the Year Award	Helen Mirren	Won	
Satellite Awards	Best Motion Picture – Drama		Nominated	
Satellite Awards	Best Actress in a Motion Picture – Drama	Helen Mirren	Won	
Satellite Awards	Best Director	Stephen Frears	Nominated	
Satellite Awards	Best Original Screenplay	Peter Morgan	Won	
Screen Actors Guild Awards	Outstanding Performance by a Female Actor in a Leading Role	Helen Mirren	Won	
Southeastern Film Critics Association Awards	Best Picture		3rd Place	
Southeastern Film Critics Association Awards	Best Actress	Helen Mirren	Won	
St. Louis Gateway Film Critics Association Awards	Best Picture		Nominated	
St. Louis Gateway Film Critics Association Awards	Best Director	Stephen Frears	Nominated	
St. Louis Gateway Film Critics Association Awards	Best Actress	Helen Mirren	Won	
St. Louis Gateway Film Critics Association Awards	Best Screenplay	Peter Morgan	Won	
Toronto Film Critics Association Awards	Best Film		Won	
Toronto Film Critics Association Awards	Best Director	Stephen Frears	Won	
Toronto Film Critics Association Awards	Best Actress	Helen Mirren	Won	
Toronto Film Critics Association Awards	Best Supporting Actor	Michael Sheen	Won	
Toronto Film Critics Association Awards	Best Screenplay	Peter Morgan	Won	
Utah Film Critics Association Awards	Best Actress	Helen Mirren	Won	
Utah Film Critics Association Awards	Best Supporting Actor	Michael Sheen	Won	
Vancouver Film Critics Circle Awards	Best Actress	Helen Mirren	Won	
Venice Film Festival	Golden Lion	Stephen Frears	Nominated	
Venice Film Festival	FIPRESCI Award	Stephen Frears	Won	
Venice Film Festival	Best Actress	Helen Mirren	Won	
Venice Film Festival	Golden Osella	Peter Morgan	Won	
Village Voice Film Poll	Best Film		4th Place	
Village Voice Film Poll	Best Actress	Helen Mirren	Won	
Washington D.C. Area Film Critics Association Awards	Best Actress	Helen Mirren	Won	
Women Film Critics Circle Awards	Best Picture About a Woman		Won (Note: Tied with Volver.)	
Women Film Critics Circle Awards	Best Actress	Helen Mirren	Won	
Women's Image Network Awards	Outstanding Lead Actress in a Feature Film	Helen Mirren	Won	
World Soundtrack Awards	Soundtrack Composer of the Year	Alexandre Desplat (also for The Painted Veil)	Won	
Writers Guild of America Awards	Best Original Screenplay	Peter Morgan	Nominated	

=== Top ten lists ===
The film appeared on many US critics' top ten lists of the best films of 2006.

- 1st – Frank Scheck, The Hollywood Reporter
- 1st – William Arnold, Seattle Post-Intelligencer
- 2nd – Richard Roeper, Chicago Sun Times
- 2nd – Michael Rechtshaffen, The Hollywood Reporter
- 3rd – David Ansen, Newsweek
- 3rd – Ella Taylor, LA Weekly
- 3rd – Richard Schickel, TIME magazine
- 3rd – Sheri Linden, The Hollywood Reporter
- 4th – Chris Kaltenbach, The Baltimore Sun
- 4th – Claudia Puig, USA Today
- 4th – Kenneth Turan, Los Angeles Times (tied with Venus)
- 4th – Stephen Holden, The New York Times
- 5th – Dennis Harvey, Variety
- 5th – Kirk Honeycutt, The Hollywood Reporter
- 5th – Mick LaSalle, San Francisco Chronicle
- 5th – Stephanie Zacharek, Salon (tied with Marie Antoinette)
- 6th – Marjorie Baumgarten, The Austin Chronicle
- 6th – Michael Sragow, The Baltimore Sun
- 6th – Shawn Levy, The Oregonian
- 7th – Lawrence Toppman, The Charlotte Observer
- 7th – Peter Travers, Rolling Stone
- 9th – Jack Mathews, New York Daily News
- 9th – Lisa Schwarzbaum, Entertainment Weekly
- 9th – Michael Phillips, Chicago Tribune
- 9th – Michael Wilmington, Chicago Tribune
- 9th – Nathan Rabin, The A.V. Club
- 9th – Ty Burr, The Boston Globe
- 10th – Glenn Kenny, Premiere
- 10th – Staff, Film Threat

General top ten

- Carina Chocano, Los Angeles Times
- Carrie Rickey, The Philadelphia Inquirer
- Dana Stevens, Slate
- Joe Morgenstern, The Wall Street Journal
- Liam Lacey and Rick Groen, The Globe and Mail
- Peter Rainer, The Christian Science Monitor
- Ruthe Stein, San Francisco Chronicle
- Steven Rea, The Philadelphia Inquirer

== Soundtrack ==
The Queen

Soundtrack album by Alexandre Desplat
- Released: 26 September 2006
- Recorded: 2006
- Genre: Soundtrack
- Length: 44:27
- Label: Milan

Alexandre Desplat chronology
The Singer (2006)	The Queen (2006)	The Painted Veil (2006)

The soundtrack album was released on the Milan label on 26 September 2006. The original score and songs were composed by Alexandre Desplat and performed by the London Symphony Orchestra. The album was nominated for the Academy Award for Best Original Score. It was also nominated for the BAFTA Award for Best Film Music (it lost to the score of Babel).

No.	Title	Length
1.	"The Queen"	2:10
2.	"Hills of Scotland"	2:25
3.	"People's Princess I"	4:08
4.	"A New Prime Minister"	1:55
5.	"H.R.H."	2:22
6.	"The Stag"	1:50
7.	"Mourning"	3:50
8.	"Elizabeth & Tony"	2:04
9.	"River of Sorrow"	1:59
10.	"The Flowers of Buckingham"	2:28
11.	"The Queen Drives"	1:48
12.	"Night in Balmoral"	1:09
13.	"Tony & Elizabeth"	2:06
14.	"People's Princess II"	4:08
15.	"Queen of Hearts"	3:33
16.	"Libera Me (Verdi)"	6:27
Total length:		44:27
