= James Whale (presenter) =

British radio DJ (1951–2025)

James Whale MBE
- Born: Michael James Whale; 13 May 1951; Ewell, Surrey, England
- Died: 4 August 2025 (aged 74); Aylesford, Kent, England
- Years active: 1970–2025
- Spouses: Melinda Maxted (m. 1971; died 2018) Nadine Lamont-Brown (m. 2021)
- Children: 2
- Website: www.jameswhaleradio.co.uk

Michael James Whale (13 May 1951 – 4 August 2025) was a British radio personality, television presenter and podcaster who gained initial prominence in the 1980s as the host of The James Whale Radio Show on Radio Aire in Leeds, which was simulcast on national television.

From 1995 to 2008 he hosted a night-time radio show on Talksport, followed by stints on LBC 97.3 and various BBC radio stations. Whale was the host of the podcast The James Whale Show and a night-time weekly radio show on talkRADIO. Whale was known as a presenter who was controversial and outspoken. In 2008, he was suspended by Talksport for urging listeners to vote for Boris Johnson in the upcoming London mayoral election. In 2018 he was suspended by talkRADIO pending an investigation for appearing to ridicule a guest, the journalist Nichi Hodgson, who was speaking on air about her experience of sexual assault. He was later reinstated.

He was appointed Member of the Order of the British Empire (MBE) in the 2024 New Year Honours for services to broadcasting and charity.

== Early life ==
Michael James Whale was born on 13 May 1951 in Ewell, Surrey, into "an ordinary middle class family". His English father, David, worked in the family business S&R Whale, which made dresses, aprons and overalls in a factory in Brixton, London. His Welsh mother, Anne (née Price), was a professional ballet dancer. His parents later owned The Green Man pub in Ewell. Whale had a younger brother, Keith. Whale did not enjoy his school life. After failing his eleven-plus exam, he attended Linton's Lane Secondary Modern School and Longmead County Secondary Boys School, both in Epsom.

From the age of fourteen to sixteen, Whale took up archery and became a Surrey junior champion. He relocated to the King's Cross area of London, where his parents ran a pub. He wanted to become an actor, but his mother advised him to "get a proper job". Among Whale's first jobs was as a trainee buyer for Harrods. In this job he came into contact with a DJ who influenced him to become one soon after, citing Tony Blackburn, Johnnie Walker and Kid Jensen as among his favourites. After learning that Watneys was to open a chain of discos, Whale took their DJ training course and landed his first gig at The Bird's Nest in Muswell Hill, north London. He found the experience "dull", but realised he had an ability to introduce records and worked at a Watney's venue in Sweden for several months. Upon returning home Whale resumed DJ work, took acting lessons and worked as a rep, but earned little money.

== Career ==
=== 1970–1995: Early career and ITV television show ===
Whale began his broadcasting career in 1970 following a visit to a Topshop store on Regent Street, London. He spoke to manager Ralph Halpern who initially declined to hire a DJ for the store, after which he worked as an assistant stage manager at a theatre in Oxford. Whale was soon invited back to Topshop and accepted work as one of the launch DJs of Radio Topshop, the in-house radio station. In 1974, he became the host of an evening talk radio show at Metro Radio, serving northeast England from studios in Swalwell, Gateshead. He was the first presenter of the successful Nightowls programme, which he continued hosting into the early 1980s. During this time, Whale took up additional work as an actor, playing roles in Z-Cars. He later moved to BBC Radio Derby to host a morning phone-in, working with Terry Christian who later became a colleague at Talksport. In 1982 Whale joined Radio Aire in Leeds to host the late-night talk show; by 1986 he moved to the Breakfast Show, before returning to the late show in early 1987.

In the late 1980s Whale became influenced by American radio hosts, including the "shock jock" Howard Stern, and changed his style, having become tired of the "lovely phone-ins" that he had been accustomed to. Commencing on the "Friday night" of 24 September 1988 – the 1 am start time making it technically a Saturday morning – Whale's radio show at Radio Aire was simulcast with Yorkshire Television and was titled The James Whale Radio Show, featuring live studio guests, music and listener phone calls. The show became a ratings success, and in less than seven months it started to air nationally on ITV. The Conservative MP Jerry Hayes had a regular slot on the show and Steve Coogan also made regular appearances. By September 1989, the show attracted over one million viewers. It cost the television station £15,000 to run each hour.

In January 1993 Whale began a new ITV series, Whale On.

=== 1995–2008: Talk Radio/Talksport ===
He was known as a presenter who was controversial and outspoken. In 2008 at Talksport he was suspended for urging listeners to vote for Boris Johnson in the London mayoral election. Whale initially tried to pursue a legal case against Talksport, before withdrawing the legal action. The media regulator said Talksport had broken the code on ensuring due impartiality, and said the breach was so serious that it had considered whether to impose a sanction on the station, which could have included a fine.

=== 2008–2013: LBC ===
On 7 May 2008 Whale said he would join Bid TV. He continued to broadcast on JamesWhaleRadio.co.uk. On 20 May 2008, Whale began a four-hour weekly evening phone-in on Internet radio station Play Radio UK; however, on 2 September 2008, he said on air he was leaving Play Radio for book promotion and TV work.

After standing in for Clive Bull on LBC 97.3 for six days in August 2008, Whale covered for Nick Abbot for two weeks from 29 September 2008 on LBC. In November the same year, he began presenting the drivetime show on LBC between 4 pm and 7 pm every weekday.

=== 2013–2016: Various projects ===
After leaving LBC 97.3 Whale presented shows at BBC Radio Berkshire, BBC Three Counties Radio, BBC Radio WM, occasionally BBC Radio Kent and a new online format of his hit 1989 TV show, Whales Weekly.

In September 2013 Whale launched his weekly podcast, The James Whale Radio Show, which was produced by Rob Oldfield. The podcast ran for over 300 original episodes.

On 13 December 2013 Whale announced that he would be the new permanent presenter of the BBC Essex breakfast programme. He presented his last show on the station on 23 September 2016.

On 28 July 2016 Whale entered the Celebrity Big Brother house to compete as a housemate in its eighteenth series. He was the sixth to be evicted, coming ninth overall.

=== 2016–2025: talkRADIO & TalkTV ===
Whale began covering shows on talkRADIO in October 2016 and he started presenting the Monday to Thursday evening show between 7 pm and 10 pm from 7 November 2016.

On 3 August 2018 Whale was suspended by talkRADIO, pending a full investigation, after an interview with the author and journalist Nichi Hodgson, who had been sexually assaulted. In a statement, TalkRadio said Whale's interview with Hodgson "completely lacked sensitivity" and was conducted "in a manner that did not reflect the values of the station". In a video clip from the interview, which was later deleted, Whale was seen shaking his head and laughing when the interviewee described what had happened to her. Whale returned to work at the station ten days later on 13 August. He presented James Whale Unleashed on TalkTV and TalkRadio.

== Personal life and death ==
In 1971, Whale married Melinda Maxted. They had two sons. In 2018, he announced that Maxted had been diagnosed with stage four lung cancer. She died on 12 May 2018. On 13 May 2021, his 70th birthday, Whale announced his engagement on Twitter, but did not reveal his fiancée's identity. In October of that year, he married Nadine Lamont-Brown at a ceremony in Tenterden, Kent.

In 2000, Whale was diagnosed with kidney cancer. He had not experienced any symptoms until he noticed blood in his urine, caused by a large tumour on his left kidney. He underwent an operation from which he had a 50% chance of survival, and chose not to have chemotherapy afterwards. In 2006, he launched the James Whale Fund for Kidney Cancer to fund research and raise awareness of the disease. The fund became Kidney Cancer UK in 2016. In August 2020, Whale said that his cancer had spread to his spine, brain and lungs. In 2024, he posted an online video encouraging people to get blood tests for cancer.

He often spoke of his dyslexia.

Whale died of cancer on 4 August 2025, aged 74.

== Bibliography ==
- Whale, James (1997). Bald on Top. Michael O'Mara Books. ISBN 978-0-86051-991-1.
- Whale, James (2007). Almost a Celebrity: A Lifetime of Night-Time. Robson Books. ISBN 978-1-84317-261-1.

== Sources ==
- Whale, James (2007). Almost a Celebrity: A Lifetime of Night-Time (2011 print ed.). Robson Books. ISBN 978-1-84317-261-1.
- "Conversations. Episode 38: James Whale". RadioMoments. 22 January 2017. Archived from the original on 28 June 2018.
