= Alliance of Women Film Journalists Award for Best Picture =

The Alliance of Women Film Journalists Award for Best Picture is an annual award given by the Alliance of Women Film Journalists. The award is often referred to as an EDA as a tribute to AWFJ founder Jennifer Merin's mother, actress Eda Reiss Merin. EDA is also an acronym for Excellent Dynamic Activism.

== Winners ==
=== 2000s ===
Year	Winner and nominees	Director(s) and/or Producer(s)
2006	Pan's Labyrinth	Guillermo del Toro
2006	The Departed	Martin Scorsese
2006	Dreamgirls	Bill Condon
2006	The Queen	Stephen Frears
2006	Volver	Pedro Almodóvar
2007	No Country for Old Men	Joel & Ethan Coen, Scott Rudin
2007	Atonement	Tim Bevan, Eric Fellner, Paul Webster
2007	The Diving Bell and the Butterfly	Kathleen Kennedy, Jon Kilik
2007	Into the Wild	Art Linson, Sean Penn, Bill Pohlad
2008	Slumdog Millionaire	Christian Colson
2008	Happy-Go-Lucky	Simon Channing Williams
2008	Milk	Bruce Cohen, Dan Jinks
2009	The Hurt Locker	Kathryn Bigelow, Mark Boal, Nicolas Chartier, Greg Shapiro
2009	An Education	Finola Dwyer, Amanda Posey
2009	Precious	Lee Daniels, Tom Heller, Gary Magness, Sarah Siegel-Magness, Tyler Perry, Oprah Winfrey
2009	Up in the Air	Jeffrey Clifford, Daniel Dubiecki, Ivan Reitman, Jason Reitman

=== 2010s ===
Year	Winner and nominees	Director(s) and/or Producer(s)
2010	The Social Network	Dana Brunetti, Ceán Chaffin, Michael De Luca, Scott Rudin
2010	Black Swan	Scott Franklin, Mike Medavoy, Arnold Messer, Brian Oliver
2010	Inception	Christopher Nolan, Emma Thomas
2010	The King's Speech	Iain Canning, Emile Sherman, Gareth Unwin
2010	Winter's Bone	Alix Madigan, Anne Rosellini
2011	The Artist	Thomas Langmann
2011	The Descendants	Jim Burke, Alexander Payne, Jim Taylor
2011	Hugo	Johnny Depp, Tim Headington, Graham King, Martin Scorsese
2011	Melancholia	Meta Louise Foldager Sørensen, Louise Vesth
2011	Midnight in Paris	Letty Aronson, Jaume Roures, Stephen Tenenbaum
2012	Zero Dark Thirty	Kathryn Bigelow, Mark Boal, Megan Ellison
2012	Argo	Ben Affleck, George Clooney, Grant Heslov
2012	Lincoln	Kathleen Kennedy, Steven Spielberg
2013	12 Years a Slave	Dede Gardner, Anthony Katagas, Jeremy Kleiner, Steve McQueen, Arnon Milchan, Brad Pitt, Bill Pohlad
2013	American Hustle	Megan Ellison, Charles Roven, Richard Suckle
2013	Gravity	Alfonso Cuarón, David Heyman
2013	Her	Megan Ellison, Spike Jonze, Vincent Landay
2013	Inside Llewyn Davis	Joel Coen and Ethan Coen, Scott Rudin
2013	Nebraska	Albert Berger, Ron Yerxa
2014	Boyhood	Richard Linklater, Jonathan Sehring, John Sloss, Cathleen Sutherland
2014	Birdman	Alejandro G. Iñárritu, John Lesher, Arnon Milchan, James W. Skotchdopole
2014	The Grand Budapest Hotel	Wes Anderson, Jeremy Dawson, Steven Rales, Scott Rudin
2014	Only Lovers Left Alive	Reinhard Brundig, Jeremy Thomas
2014	Selma	Christian Colson, Dede Gardner, Jeremy Kleiner, Oprah Winfrey
2015	Spotlight	
2015	Carol	
2015	Mad Max: Fury Road	
2015	The Martian	
2015	Room	
2016	Moonlight	
2016	Arrival	
2016	Hell or High Water	
2016	La La Land	
2016	Manchester by the Sea	
