= The Special Relationship (film) =

2010 film by Richard Loncraine

- Promotional poster
- Genre: Biographical drama
- Written by: Peter Morgan
- Directed by: Richard Loncraine
- Starring: Michael Sheen; Dennis Quaid; Hope Davis; Helen McCrory
- Music by: Alexandre Desplat
- Countries of origin: United States; United Kingdom
- Original language: English

Production
- Executive producers: Kathleen Kennedy; Frank Marshall; Andrew Harries; Christine Langan; Peter Morgan
- Producers: Frank Doelger; Tracey Scoffield; Ann Wingate
- Cinematography: Barry Ackroyd
- Editor: Melanie Oliver
- Running time: 93 minutes
- Production companies: HBO Films; BBC Film; Rainmark Films; The Kennedy/Marshall Company

Original release
- Network: HBO
- Release: 29 May 2010
- Network: BBC Two
- Release: 18 September 2010

The Special Relationship is a 2010 biographical drama television film directed by Richard Loncraine and written by Peter Morgan. It is the third film in Morgan's informal "Blair trilogy", which dramatizes the political career of British prime minister Tony Blair (1997–2007), following The Deal (2003) and The Queen (2006), both directed by Stephen Frears.

The first drafts of The Special Relationship dealt with Blair's special relationships with U.S. presidents Bill Clinton and George W. Bush. However, Morgan excluded the Bush scenes from subsequent drafts (thus ending the narrative on 20 January 2001) because he found the Blair/Clinton dynamic more interesting. Morgan intended to make his directorial debut with the film but backed out a month before filming began and was replaced by Loncraine. The film was produced by Rainmark Films and backed by HBO Films and BBC Films.

The film stars Michael Sheen reprising his role as Blair, Dennis Quaid as Clinton, Hope Davis as Hillary Clinton, and Helen McCrory as Cherie Blair. Principal photography on locations in and around London, England ran from 20 July – 4 September 2009. The film was broadcast on HBO in the United States and Canada on 29 May 2010, and on BBC Two and BBC HD in the United Kingdom on 18 September 2010.

== Premise ==
The film is set between the years of 1997 and 2001 and depicts the UK–US Special Relationship between Prime Minister Tony Blair and President Bill Clinton. Executive producer Christine Langan said of the plot, "The film's time frame goes from 1994, when New Labour was taking lessons from Clinton's people, to 1998 and the end of the Kosovo War. It focuses on the international activities of Blair as prime minister and what he learns from his American ally. They're brothers in arms, but Clinton is weakened by the Lewinsky scandal in the middle of it all, while Blair strengthens his position, moving from being something of an acolyte to equal to moral superior, post-Kosovo."

== Cast ==
- Michael Sheen as Tony Blair, Prime Minister of the United Kingdom. Sheen previously played Blair in Peter Morgan's The Deal and The Queen. Critics noted that his portrayal in The Queen was much more sympathetic than in The Deal, which Morgan attributed to Blair being in a "honeymoon" period after his appointment as prime minister in May 1997. Sheen felt a greater scope to play Blair in this film compared to the previous two; "This was interesting because it covers a much bigger period of time for the character. It allowed me to explore things I wasn't able to explore in the other films and take things further. I just found it a very fascinating story how this man changed with time and how he developed and how he became the man making the choices he eventually made that turned a lot of people against him."
- Dennis Quaid as Bill Clinton, President of the United States. To match Clinton's physique, Quaid gained 35 pounds (16 kg) in weight by eating McDonald's food every day—which he described as being like "a baby on a feeding schedule"—and had his eyebrows trimmed and his hair grayed. He worked on adopting Clinton's accent, and fell into character once he wore a suit and "Clinton wig". Quaid met Clinton in the late 1990s when he spent a weekend at the White House. He previously played a President of the United States (albeit fictional) in the film American Dreamz, whom he based on George W. Bush. Russell Crowe, Philip Seymour Hoffman, Alec Baldwin and Tim Robbins were also considered to play the role. Screenwriter Morgan thought Vince Vaughn would have been a good choice if the film was being made ten years later.
- Hope Davis as Hillary Clinton, First Lady of the United States. Davis began filming her scenes at the beginning of August. She prepared for the role by listening to audio tapes of Clinton and reading books about her. She also watched video clips of her on YouTube and tried to "get the flavor of her speech across" without directly imitating her accent. Davis told The New York Times, "...she's hard to imitate. Her accent has changed a bit over the years. In 1992, when she became first lady, she had quite a bit of Arkansas still in her speech from her 13 years there. That's really gone now. So her accent has kind of shifted over time but she's lived in very different places." To accurately portray Clinton's appearance, Davis was fitted with a wig, false teeth and wore specially tailored brightly colored pantsuits. Quaid predicted that Davis would receive a lot of attention for her portrayal: "She really looks like Hillary with the puffed up hair and some hip additives". Julianne Moore was originally cast in the role, but was forced to quit less than two weeks before principal photography began, due to commitments to the film The Kids Are All Right.
- Helen McCrory as Cherie Blair. McCrory reprises her role as Blair's wife from The Queen. When playing Cherie in The Queen, McCrory found there was little information about her because as Tony Blair was prime minister, Cherie did not give interviews or make herself public. Since 2006, Cherie's autobiography has been published, meaning McCrory did not have to rely on hearsay to learn about her. McCrory had already briefly met Cherie. Her husband Damian Lewis recommended that she should meet her again to research the role, but McCrory decided not to, telling The Sunday Times, "The problem is, if you've met somebody, you have a responsibility to them. I don't think it's fair to ask her about Stormont, or Kosovo, or Matrix Chambers... then it not be in the film. At the end of the day, it's not my Cherie Blair, it's Peter Morgan's Cherie Blair."

Adam Godley plays Jonathan Powell, Blair's chief of staff, who plays a role in the Northern Ireland peace process endorsed by Blair and Clinton. Ten-year-old actor Max Cottage portrays the Blairs' eldest son Euan. President of France Jacques Chirac (1995–2007) is portrayed by Marc Rioufol. The producers were having difficulty casting the part in March. Mark Bazeley reprises his role of Blair's spin doctor Alastair Campbell from The Queen, and background actor Chris Wilson portrays Blair's chancellor of the exchequer Gordon Brown. David Morrissey, who played Brown in The Deal, was asked to reprise the role, but declined because Brown appears in only one scene. Instead of the producers casting an actress to play Monica Lewinsky, archive footage is used.

== Production ==
Peter Morgan's first production featuring Michael Sheen as Tony Blair was the Channel 4 single drama The Deal (2003), which dramatized the rise of Gordon Brown (David Morrissey) and Blair when they were new Members of Parliament. The drama depicted their rise in the Labour Party culminating in the 1994 leadership election. The Deal's critical success led to a theatrical film, The Queen (2006), about the impact of the death of Diana, Princess of Wales on senior members of the Royal Family and Prime Minister Tony Blair. The film featured Sheen as Blair in a supporting role, in what critics noted was a more subdued portrayal than in The Deal. Before Morgan began writing the script for The Special Relationship in late 2007, there was speculation that the film would be produced by Left Bank Pictures and BBC Films, where the Deal and Queen producers Andy Harries and Christine Langan were based; Langan told guardian.co.uk in October 2007 that Morgan had "promised" the script to her and Harries, though no contracts had been signed.

Three films about Blair had been planned since The Deal. Morgan had considered writing a film about Blair during the run-up to the 2003 invasion of Iraq as the subject matter for both the second and third film. He eventually decided to do a film about the special relationship between the United Kingdom and the United States, specifically Blair's differing relationship with Clinton and George W. Bush. Harries said that Morgan believed the transition from Clinton's to Bush's presidency was a "pivotal moment" in the special relationship. Morgan decided to narrow down the scope of the film to just Blair and Clinton, since he believed people tended to have forgotten about the state of politics prior to the September 11 attacks, a time that was "really, really interesting". Langan believed that Morgan found Clinton to be "a more interesting study than Bush" and that New Labour aped the Clinton administration at its inception. Morgan began his research into the Blair/Clinton relationship after learning that the two had been alone together when Al Gore conceded defeat after the 2000 presidential election. His research took him to Washington, D.C., where he interviewed members of Clinton's cabinet, and to Little Rock, Arkansas, where Clinton had served over 13 years in state office as Attorney General and later Governor.

In late 2008, Kathleen Kennedy signed on as an executive producer. Ann Wingate, Frank Doelger and Tracey Scoffield are producers, and Andy Harries, Christine Langan and Kennedy are executive producers. HBO Films is producing, with co-production funding coming from BBC Films. Morgan signed on to direct the film—making his directorial debut—as the director of The Deal and The Queen Stephen Frears was "Blaired out". In June 2009, shortly before filming began, Morgan pulled out of directing the film. Morgan's agent told a Daily Telegraph diary that Morgan wanted to concentrate on writing and producing, but did not rule out directing in future. Costumes were designed by Consolata Boyle, whose work on The Queen won acclaim and awards. After a week of read-throughs and rehearsals, filming began on 20 July 2009 and ran until 4 September. Filming locations included Langley Park, the Emirates Stadium and the Westminster Central Hall. Brocket Hall and the Loseley Park mansion doubled as Chequers, the Prime Minister's country retreat. Scenes set in the Oval Office were filmed on a set built on E Stage at Pinewood Studios. E Stage also housed a recreation of the White House gardens and colonnade outside the Oval Office. Several other locations were used, in conjunction with the UK Film Council's regional agencies Film London, Screen East, and Screen South.

Loncraine continued directing pick-ups into October; background scenes were shot in Washington, D.C., on locations including Pennsylvania Avenue and Constitution Avenue. During post-production, cinematographer Barry Ackroyd created two versions of the film with different aspect ratios; one has a 16:9 aspect for broadcast on HBO in the United States, and the other has a 1: 2.35 aspect for worldwide theatrical release. After filming the cinema version in the larger format, Ackroyd trimmed the picture for the television version using a pan and scan technique. The film's score was composed by Alexandre Desplat, who also worked on the music for The Queen. Final post-production mixing was carried out at Twickenham Film Studios, and was scheduled for completion in the second week of March 2010.

== Release ==
In the United States and Canada, HBO first broadcast the film on 29 May 2010. Roadshow Films released the film theatrically in Australia on 5 August 2010 after acquiring the rights at the 2009 Cannes Film Festival. The film debuted at eighth position at the box office in its opening weekend, taking $169,214.

BBC Two broadcast the film in the United Kingdom on 18 September 2010, as part of a drive to screen more BBC Films productions on the station. It was released on DVD and Blu-ray in the UK on 20 September 2010.

== Critical reception ==
The film received positive reviews from critics. Review aggregator Rotten Tomatoes reports that 86% out of 21 professional critics gave the film a positive review, with a rating average of 6.8/10. Metacritic gave it a rating of 67 and stated it has received "generally favorable reviews".

== Accolades ==
Year	Award	Category	Nominee(s)	Result	Ref.
2010	Artios Awards	Outstanding Achievement in Casting – Television Movie/Mini Series	Nina Gold	Nominated	
2010	Online Film & Television Association Awards	Best Motion Picture or Miniseries		Nominated	
2010	Online Film & Television Association Awards	Best Actor in a Motion Picture or Miniseries	Dennis Quaid	Nominated	
2010	Online Film & Television Association Awards	Best Actor in a Motion Picture or Miniseries	Michael Sheen	Nominated	
2010	Online Film & Television Association Awards	Best Actress in a Motion Picture or Miniseries	Hope Davis	Nominated	
2010	Online Film & Television Association Awards	Best Writing of a Motion Picture or Miniseries		Nominated	
2010	Online Film & Television Association Awards	Best Ensemble in a Motion Picture or Miniseries		Nominated	
2010	Online Film & Television Association Awards	Best Editing in a Non-Series		Nominated	
2010	Online Film & Television Association Awards	Best Makeup/Hairstyling in a Non-Series		Nominated	
2010	Primetime Emmy Awards	Outstanding Made for Television Movie	Christine Langan, Kathleen Kennedy, Frank Marshall, Peter Morgan, Andy Harries, Frank Doelger, Tracey Scoffield, and Ann Wingate	Nominated	
2010	Primetime Emmy Awards	Outstanding Lead Actor in a Miniseries or Movie	Dennis Quaid	Nominated	
2010	Primetime Emmy Awards	Outstanding Lead Actor in a Miniseries or Movie	Michael Sheen	Nominated	
2010	Primetime Emmy Awards	Outstanding Lead Actress in a Miniseries or Movie	Hope Davis	Nominated	
2010	Primetime Emmy Awards	Outstanding Writing for a Miniseries, Movie or a Dramatic Special	Peter Morgan	Nominated	
2010	Satellite Awards	Best Motion Picture Made for Television		Nominated	
2010	Satellite Awards	Best Actor in a Miniseries or a Motion Picture Made for Television	Dennis Quaid	Nominated	
2010	Satellite Awards	Best Actress in a Miniseries or a Motion Picture Made for Television	Hope Davis	Nominated	
2010	Women's Image Network Awards	Actress in a Mini-Series / Made for Television Movie	Hope Davis	Nominated	
2011	British Academy Television Awards	Best Single Drama	Production Team	Nominated	
2011	Golden Globe Awards	Best Actor in a Miniseries or Motion Picture Made for Television	Dennis Quaid	Nominated	
2011	Golden Globe Awards	Best Supporting Actress in a Series, Miniseries or Motion Picture Made for Television	Hope Davis	Nominated	
2011	Guild of Music Supervisors Awards	Best Music Supervision for Movie of the Week	Evyen Klean (Also for The Pacific, Temple Grandin, and You Don't Know Jack)	Won	
2011	Screen Actors Guild Awards	Outstanding Performance by a Male Actor in a Television Movie or Miniseries	Dennis Quaid	Nominated	
