= James Whale Fund for Kidney Cancer =

UK health charity

The James Whale Fund for Kidney Cancer changed its name to Kidney Cancer UK on 7 February 2016 to become the UK's leading specialist kidney cancer charity. It seeks to help reduce the harm caused by kidney cancer by increasing knowledge and awareness, providing patient information, and by supporting research into the causes, prevention and treatment of the disease. The charity was founded in 2006 by the broadcaster James Whale whose experience of dealing with the disease in 2000, when he lost a kidney in the process, spurred him on to set up a charity to help others in a similar position. The Fund depends primarily on voluntary donations and in its short history has published a definitive guide to kidney cancer, set up a Patient Support Network and Careline, established an online renal nurse training programme and campaigned for access to life extending drugs for NHS kidney cancer patients. The charity is governed by a board of Trustees and has its head office in Cambridge, UK.

== Aims ==
The aims of the charity are stated as being

- to help reduce the incidence of kidney cancer by increasing knowledge and awareness, and by supporting research into the causes, prevention and treatment of the disease
- to provide a support network offering advice, information and encouragement to those who've been diagnosed with kidney cancer and their carers"

James Whale Fund for Kidney Cancer is committed to raising awareness of kidney cancer amongst a range of audiences including the general public, GPs, clinicians, policy makers, health authorities and the media.

== Activity ==
The fund is involved in the lobbying of government for increased awareness, and access to new drugs not currently available on the NHS.

In 2012, The fund announced that it had established a relationship with TrialReach to provide information to patients about clinical trials

The James Whale Fund for Kidney Cancer represents the needs of kidney cancer patients in the political arena by lobbying government to;

- Increase awareness of kidney cancer among politicians and health policy makers;
- Highlight the importance of the early diagnosis of the disease;
- Gain access to the new drug treatments for advanced kidney cancer patients that are currently not available through the NHS.

The Fund attends the meetings of the All Party Parliamentary Group on Cancer at Westminster to keep abreast of government directives for the care and management of cancer patients in the UK. In addition, the Fund lobbies Westminster, the Welsh Assembly and the Scottish Parliament for access to drugs and to increase awareness of the disease.

The Fund is involved with all technology appraisals for new kidney cancer drugs conducted by the National Institute for Health and Clinical Excellence (NICE). The Fund provides expert input to the technology appraisals through the provision of expert patient witnesses on the technology appraisal committees and through appeals against NICE reimbursement decisions for kidney cancer drugs on the NHS.

Finally, the Fund lobbies MPs and Lords on behalf of kidney cancer patients to increase awareness and knowledge of the disease within government, and on specific issues with respect to patient access to drugs.

James Whale fund is also working with a number of corporates and engaging in cause-related marketing.
