= Nicholas Owen (journalist) =

British journalist

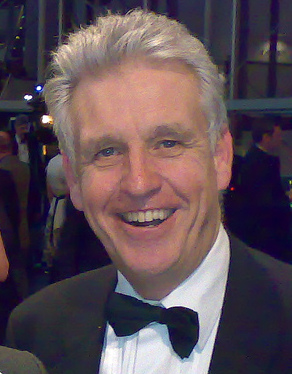
- Nicholas Owen in 2007
- Born: Nicholas David Arundel Owen; 10 February 1947 (age 79); London, England
- Occupations: Journalist, newsreader, broadcaster, writer
- Years active: 1964–present
- Employer(s): BBC, Classic FM
- Notable credit(s): BBC News; ITV News; BBC World News; BBC Breakfast
- Spouses: Philippa Biggs (m. 1968; div. 1979) Brenda Firth (m. 1983)
- Children: 2 and 2 step-children

Nicholas David Arundel Owen (born 10 February 1947) is an English journalist, television presenter and radio presenter. He previously presented on the BBC News channel and BBC One, and used to present a weekly programme on Classic FM radio.

== Early life ==
Born in London, to Tom and Edna Owen, he moved with his family while a child to Kingswood, Surrey, and was raised there and in the Redhill and Reigate area. He was initially educated at Hamsey Green primary school, Sanderstead but after his mother died when he was aged eight, he was raised by his father and sent for a period to boarding school, at what is today The Beacon School, a state comprehensive Academy school on Picquets Way in Banstead in Surrey, but was then known as Banstead County Secondary School, a state Secondary Modern School for boys, which later merged with the girls' school to become Nork Park County Secondary School in 1963.

Owen left what was then West Ewell secondary modern, on Danetree Road in Ewell (also in Surrey), with five O-levels.

== Career ==
Owen began his journalistic career on the Surrey Mirror in 1964, aged 17, before moving to Fleet Street in 1968 to work for the Evening Standard. He then joined The Daily Telegraph before spending seven years with the Financial Times. He then joined the magazine Now in 1979 as Deputy Business Editor, later becoming Business Editor.

In 1981, Owen switched to television reporting, joining the BBC in the north of England, covering general and industrial stories for both regional and national news and current affairs programmes. He described colleague Mike Neville, a well-known North East newsreader and presenter, as his mentor in a 2004 article.

Owen moved to ITN in 1984, as Channel 4 News' Business and Economics Correspondent. During the First Gulf War he presented the highly acclaimed Midnight Special Programmes when they were launched on Channel 4. He also anchored The Parliament Programme, Channel 4's first daytime political series. Between 1991 and 1994, he co-presented the ITN-produced ITV Lunchtime News with Carol Barnes.

From 1994 to April 2000 Owen was Royal Correspondent for ITV News. In that capacity he played a major role in reporting on the death and Funeral of Diana, Princess of Wales. He compiled a book on her life entitled Diana – The People's Princess. Throughout this period, he was a regular presenter of weekend news bulletins on ITN, as well as a relief presenter for both the ITV Lunchtime and Early Evening bulletins.

From 2003 to 2006, Owen once again became the main presenter of the ITV Lunchtime News on ITV. In April 2005, he joined Katie Derham on the programme, which was extended to 60 minutes as part of ITV Day. He contributed heavily to ITN's coverage of budgetary matters.

In October 2006, Owen took part in BBC One's Strictly Come Dancing. He was voted off in the first week of the show on 7 October. Also in October 2006, he appeared on ITV Play's nightly game show The Mint and gave away the jackpot of over £130,000 to the winner.

The BBC Press Office announced in November 2006 that Owen had signed to BBC News as a presenter. Owen's last broadcast on ITV was the ITV Evening News on 7 February 2007, and he took up his BBC News post on 3 March 2007. Owen was a relief presenter on the BBC News Channel, as well as being a main relief presenter for the BBC Weekend News on BBC One.

Owen has a regular Saturday afternoon show on Classic FM, and contributes to other radio and TV programmes.

In 2023, he appeared in television adverts for Hattons of London, to promote a 1/8 gold sovereign coin of King Charles III and Queen Camilla.

== Personal life ==
Owen married Philippa Biggs in 1968, with whom he had two children before divorcing in 1979. In 1983, he married former newspaper reporter Brenda Firth. The couple live in Reigate; Owen has two stepchildren from Firth's first marriage and they have nine grandchildren between each other. In 2012 his autobiography Days Like This was published.

In July 2002, Owen was diagnosed with kidney cancer, and he became an Honorary Patron of Kidney Cancer UK in 2003. On 23 August 2007, Owen was a celebrity guest in an episode of the live television programme Doctor, Doctor, broadcast on channel Five, in which he talked about his kidney cancer with the presenter and GP, Mark Porter. Owen explained that the cancer was found unexpectedly when he had a scan for abdominal pains, and that he had an operation to remove the diseased right kidney with the encapsulated tumour. Since the 1980s he has been a supporter of the charities Cancer Research UK and ActionAid, taking part in various fundraising events for these organisations.

He is an Ambassador of The Children's Trust, a UK charity for children with brain injury and neurodisability and a volunteer driver for the charity. He is also Patron of Dyscover Ltd a Surrey-based charity for people suffering from aphasia following stroke or brain injury.

Owen has a passion for railways, and has written books on the Brighton Belle and the history of the trolleybus. Owen provides the voiceover on the Tramlink in Croydon, telling passengers where the tram is going, and what the next stop is. Owen was a Vice-Patron of the Bluebell Railway's project to extend the line towards East Grinstead, and in November 2008 was the public face of the launch to remove 96,000 cubic metres (3,400,000 cu ft) of domestic waste from Imberhorne cutting. In Autumn 2023, Owen became a patron for the Volk's Electric Railway.

== Bibliography ==
- Nicholas Owen (March 1972). Brighton Belle. Southern Electric Group. ISBN 0950237604.
- Nicholas Owen (11 July 1974). History of the British Trolleybus. David & Charles. ISBN 0715363700.
- Nicholas Owen (4 June 2007). Diana: The People's Princess. Carlton Books. ISBN 978-1844428885.
- Nicholas Owen (10 February 2012). Days Like This. Blenheim Press. ISBN 978-1906302238.
