= Peter Morgan =

British playwright and screenwriter

Peter Morgan CBE
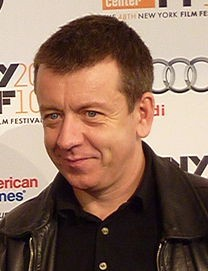
- Morgan at a Hereafter press conference, 2010
- Born: Peter Julian Robin Morgan; 10 April 1963 (age 63); Wimbledon, London, England
- Education: University of Leeds
- Occupations: Playwright; screenwriter
- Spouse: Anna Schwarzenberg (m. 1997; div. 2014)
- Partner: Gillian Anderson (2016-present)
- Children: 5
- Writing career
- Period: 1988–present
- Genres: Comedy, drama, historical fiction
- Notable works: The Queen; Frost/Nixon; The Audience; The Crown

Peter Julian Robin Morgan CBE (born 10 April 1963) is a British playwright and screenwriter. Known for his work for stage and screen, he often writes about history or figures such as Elizabeth II, whom he has covered extensively in all major media. He has received numerous accolades including five BAFTA Awards, two Primetime Emmy Awards, and four Golden Globe Awards, in addition to nominations for two Academy Awards, a Tony Award and a Laurence Olivier Award. In February 2017, Morgan was awarded a British Film Institute Fellowship.

He is the playwright behind the plays Frost/Nixon (2005), The Audience (2013), and Patriots (2022), the former of which was nominated for the Tony Award for Best Play. As a screenwriter, Morgan received Academy Award nominations for The Queen (2006) and Frost/Nixon (2008). He also wrote the screenplays for The Last King of Scotland (2006), The Other Boleyn Girl (2008), The Damned United (2009), and Rush (2013). Morgan is also known for his work in television writing the ITV series The Jury (2002), the Channel 4 film The Deal (2003), and the HBO films Longford (2006), and The Special Relationship (2010). He served as creator and show-runner of the Netflix series The Crown (2016–2023).

== Early life and education ==
Morgan was born in Wimbledon, London. His mother, Inga (née Bojcek), was a Catholic Pole who fled the Soviets, and his father, Arthur Morgenthau, was a German Jew who fled the Nazis, arriving in London in 1933. His father died when Morgan was nine years old. Morgan attended St Paul's School in London and boarding school at Downside School, Somerset, and gained a degree in Fine Art from the University of Leeds.

== Career ==
=== 1988–2005: Early career ===
Morgan wrote television scripts during the 1990s, including an episode of Rik Mayall Presents... and the Comedy Premiere The Chest. He wrote the screenplay to the romantic comedy Martha, Meet Frank, Daniel and Laurence (1998). He also served as additional writer for Madame Sousatzka (1988), co-writer on the short film Dear Rosie (1990), and wrote re-writes for the comedy King Ralph (1991). In 2002, Morgan had some success with the TV series The Jury (2002). In 2003, Morgan broke through with The Deal, a television drama about the power-sharing deal between Tony Blair and Gordon Brown that was struck in the Granita restaurant in London in 1994. Blair was portrayed by Michael Sheen, who would return to the role of Blair in The Queen and The Special Relationship.

=== 2006–2011: Breakthrough and acclaim ===
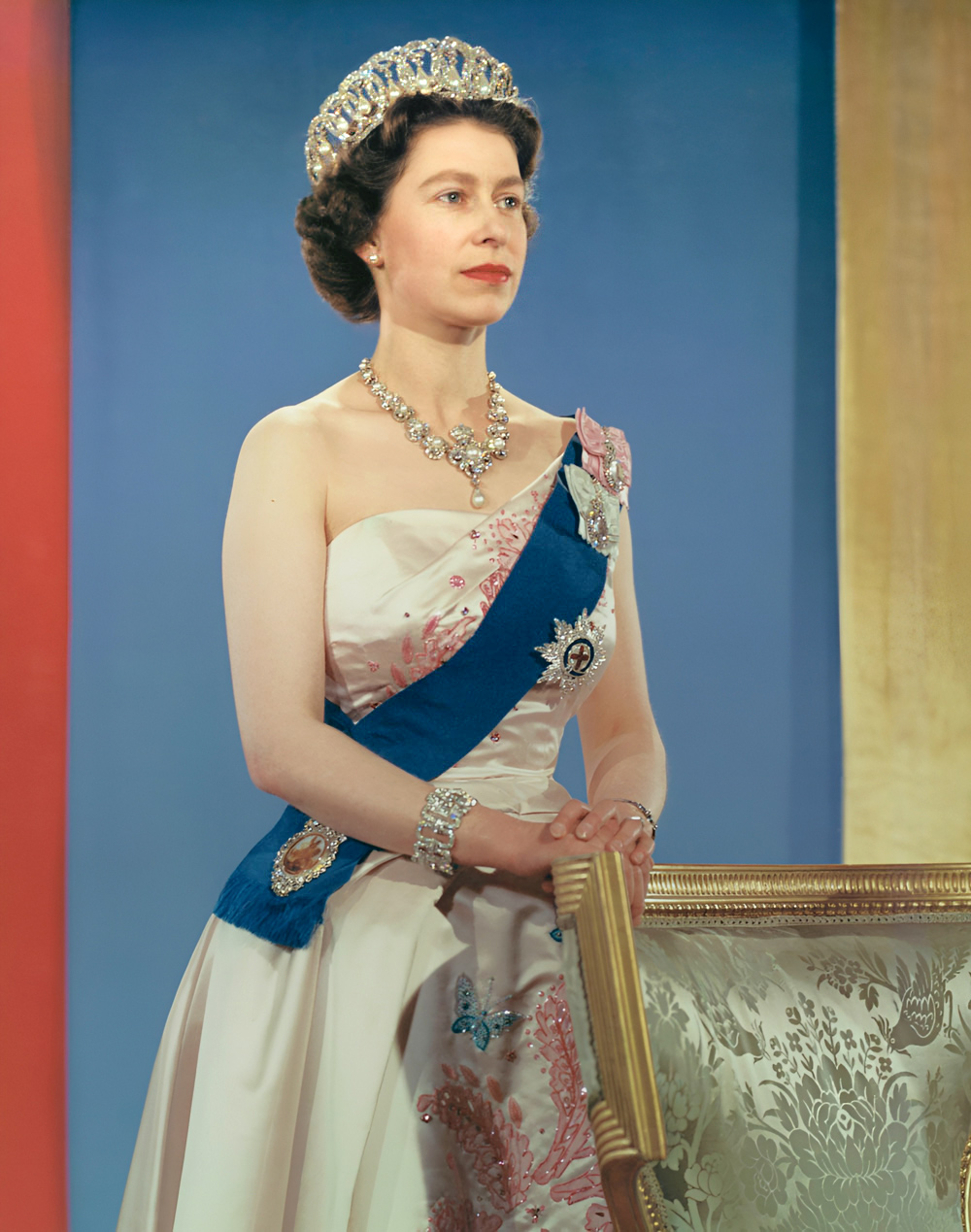
Morgan has written extensively about Queen Elizabeth II in The Queen (2006), The Audience (2013), and The Crown (2016–2023)

In 2006 The Queen was released, which showed how the death of Princess Diana impacted Prime Minister Tony Blair and the Royal Family. The film debuted at the Venice Film Festival where it received critical acclaim. The film received 6 Academy Award nominations including Best Picture. Morgan also received a nomination for Best Screenplay. Morgan received the Golden Globe Award for his screenplay from the Hollywood Foreign Press, and Helen Mirren won numerous awards for playing the title role including the Academy Award and the Golden Globe Award. 2006 also saw the release of The Last King of Scotland, the screenplay of which Morgan adapted with Jeremy Brock. In 2007 they jointly won a BAFTA Film Award for their work on the film. In May 2007, the 50th San Francisco International Film Festival honoured Morgan with the year's Kanbar Award for Excellence in Screenwriting.

Also in 2006, Morgan's first play, Frost/Nixon, was staged at the Donmar Warehouse theatre in London. Starring Michael Sheen as David Frost and Frank Langella as Richard Nixon, the play concerns the series of televised interviews that the disgraced former president granted Frost in 1977. These ended with his tacit admission of guilt regarding his role in the Watergate scandal. The play was directed by Michael Grandage and opened to enthusiastic reviews. The play transferred to Broadway in 2007 at the Bernard B. Jacobs Theatre where it ran from 21 April to 19 August. The play received three Tony Awards including one for Morgan for the Best Play. Langella won the Tony Award for Best Actor in a Play.

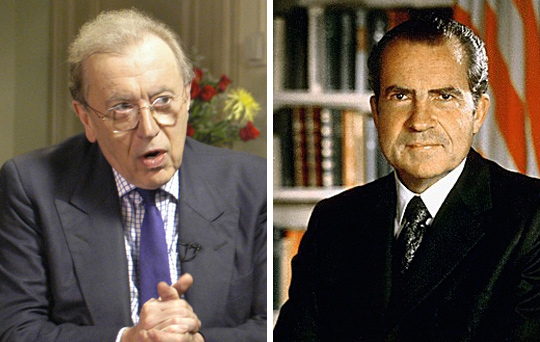
Howard directed Frost/Nixon (2008) based on the conversations between David Frost and Richard Nixon

In 2008, the film adaptation of Frost/Nixon directed by Ron Howard was released, with Sheen and Langella playing the parts they had on stage. The film also starred Kevin Bacon, Rebecca Hall, Mathew Macfadyen, Toby Jones, Oliver Platt, and Sam Rockwell. The film debuted at the London Film Festival to critical acclaim. Roger Ebert gave the film 4 stars praising the writing and the performances of the leads saying, "Frank Langella and Michael Sheen do not attempt to mimic their characters, but to embody them". Despite praise from critics the film was a box office failure. The film received five Academy Award nominations including Best Adapted Screenplay for Morgan as well as for Best Picture losing to Slumdog Millionaire (2008).

In July 2009, filming began on the television film The Special Relationship, the third film of Morgan's "Blair trilogy". The film focuses on Blair's (again played by Michael Sheen) relationship with US president Bill Clinton, played by Dennis Quaid, between 1997 and 2000. The film also features Hope Davis as Hillary Clinton and Helen McCrory as Cherie Blair. Morgan was originally scheduled to direct the film (making his directorial debut) but pulled out a month before filming began. He was replaced by Richard Loncraine. The film debuted on HBO on 29 May 2010. Barry Morgan of The Associated Press declared, "With its well-chosen cast and high production values, “Relationship” is an especially thoughtful, revealing and honest account of power and politics." The film also received positive reviews overall receiving an 83% on Rotten Tomatoes with the consensus reading, "Well-cast and compellingly directed, The Special Relationship offers an intelligent look into the complex dynamic between two world leaders." The film received five Primetime Emmy Award nominations including, for Outstanding Television Movie. Morgan was nominated for Outstanding Writing for a Limited Series or Television Movie losing to Adam Mazer for another HBO television movie You Don't Know Jack (2009).

In 2008, Morgan was initially set to adapt the John le Carré's Tinker, Tailor, Soldier, Spy into a screenplay for Working Title Films but dropped out and served as the film's executive producer. In June 2009, it was announced that he would be the co-writer of Skyfall, the 23rd James Bond film. The Daily Telegraph's Mandrake diary reported in April 2010 that Morgan had quit the production after Sam Mendes was hired to direct, and that Patrick Marber would replace him. MGM dismissed the Telegraph's claims as speculation. In the end Morgan did not receive credit but rather it was Neal Purvis, Robert Wade, and John Logan who were credited as the film's screenwriters. He has since finished the script for Hereafter, a supernatural thriller "in the vein of The Sixth Sense". DreamWorks bought the screenplay on spec in March 2008. The development was later transferred to Warner Bros. and filming began in October 2009 under the direction of Clint Eastwood.

=== 2012–present: Career expansion ===
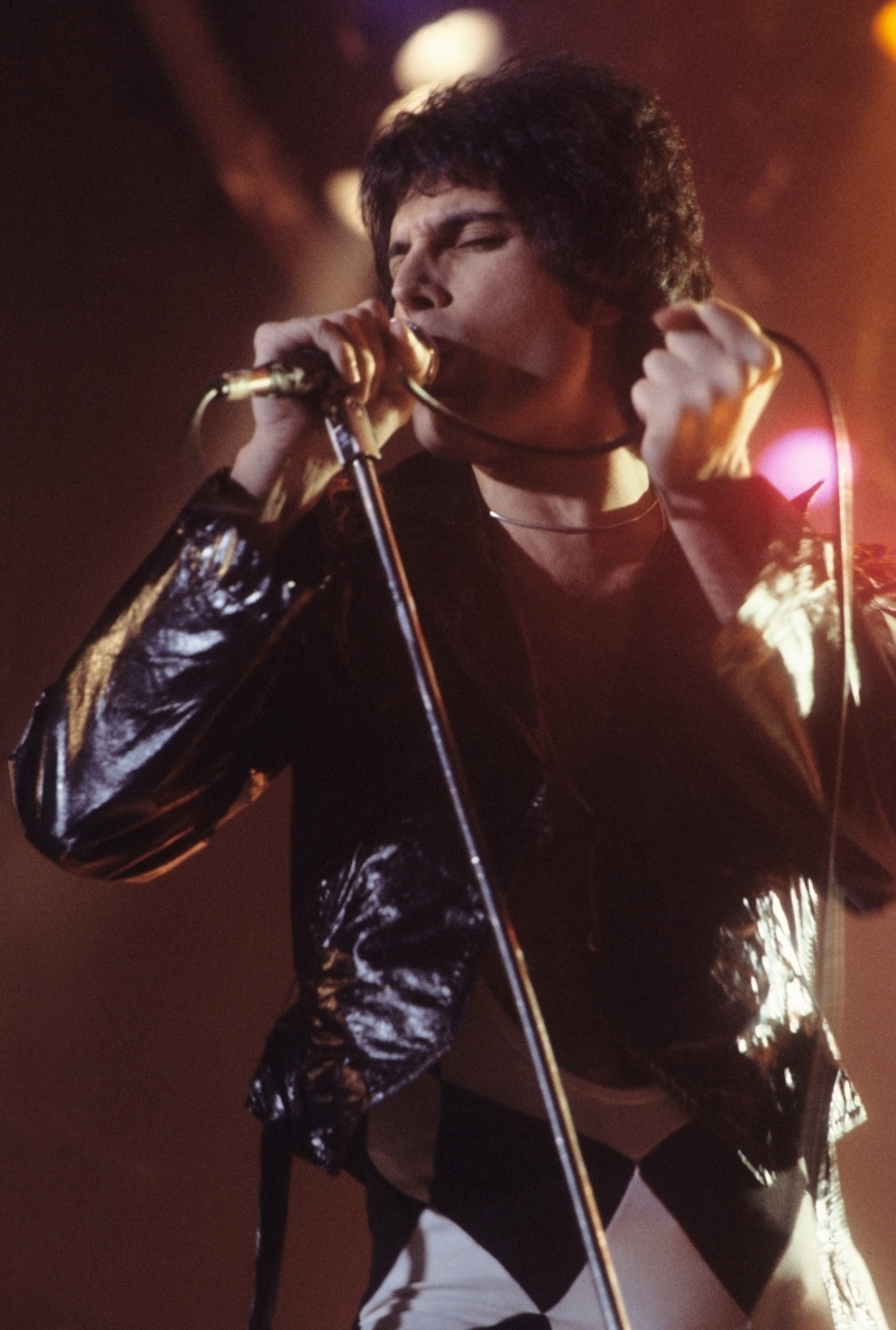
Freddie Mercury's life was depicted in Morgan's Bohemian Rhapsody. (2018)

In 2013, the film Rush was released. The film is a biographical sports film centred on the Hunt–Lauda rivalry between two Formula One drivers, the British James Hunt and the Austrian Niki Lauda during the 1976 Formula 1 motor-racing season. The film was directed by Ron Howard and written by Morgan and starred Chris Hemsworth, Daniel Brühl, and Olivia Wilde. The film was a financial and critical success. The film received four British Academy Film Award nominations including Outstanding British Film. In 2013, Morgan's play The Audience debuted. The play revolves around the weekly meetings, called audiences, between Queen Elizabeth II and her prime ministers over the time period of her reign. Dame Helen Mirren reprised her role as the Queen. The play premiered in the West End at the Gielgud Theatre where she eventually won the Olivier Award for Best Actress. A Broadway production opened in 2015 at the Gerald Schoenfeld Theatre which ran from 8 March to 15 June. Mirren also received the Tony Award for Best Actress in a Play.

Morgan's next feature film would be Bohemian Rhapsody (2018), a biopic about rock musician Freddie Mercury (portrayed by Rami Malek), the lead vocalist of the rock band Queen. Morgan has started writing the screenplay in 2010. The film was a massive box office success earning $903.7 million. The film however received a mixed critical response with critics praising Malek's central performances but criticising its editing, directing and pacing. Time Magazine film critic Stephanie Zacharek wrote, "In strict filmmaking terms, Bohemian Rhapsody is a bit of a mess. Some of its scenes connect awkwardly, and it hits every beat of disaster and triumphs squarely, like a gong." Despite its criticism, the film received various awards including four Academy Awards for Best Actor, Best Sound Editing, Best Sound Mixing, and Best Film Editing.

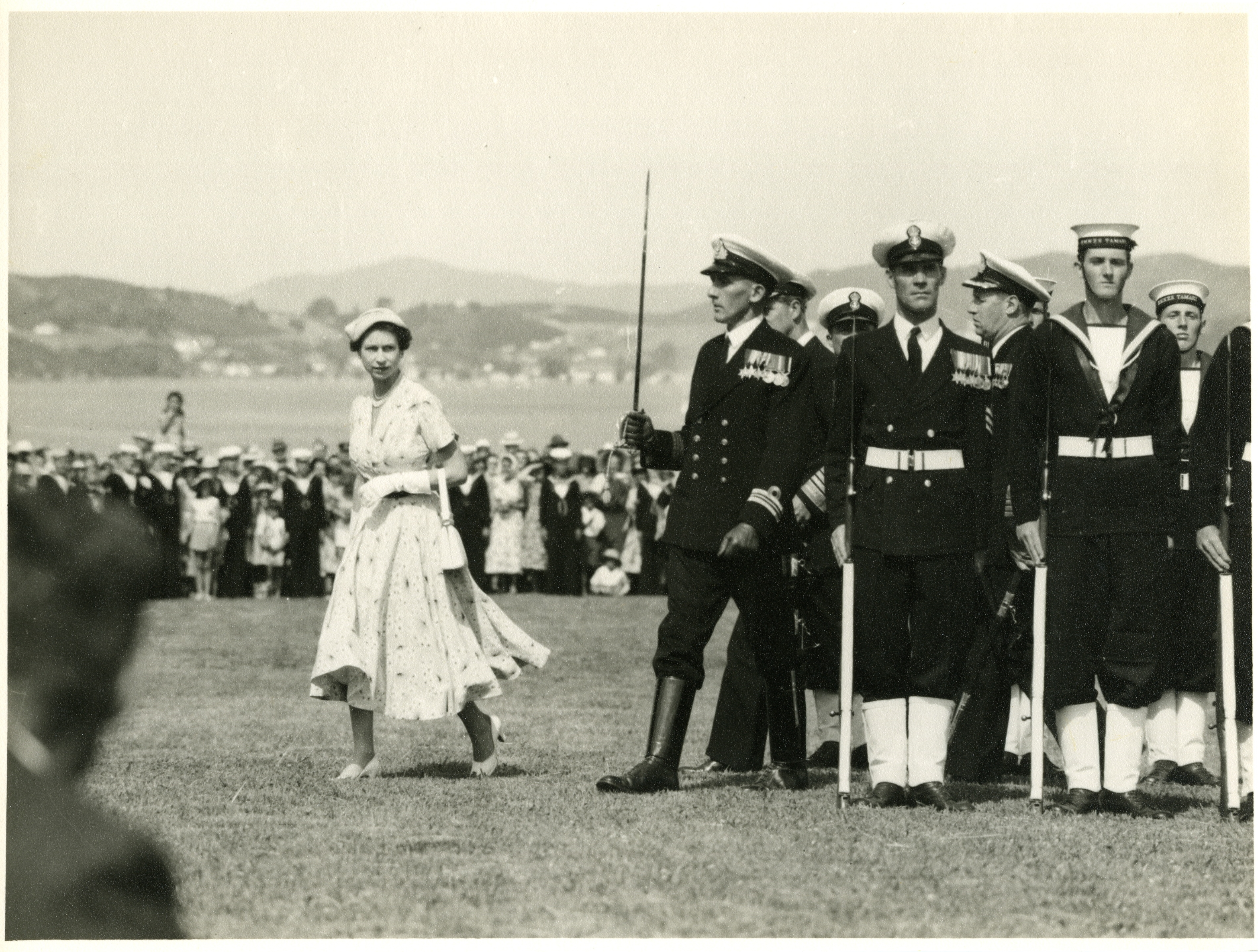
Morgan heavily profiled Queen Elizabeth II's public and private life in the Netflix series The Crown.

Morgan is the creator and writer of the Netflix fictional historical drama series The Crown, a biographical story about the reign of Queen Elizabeth II. The first season starred Claire Foy, Matt Smith, Vanessa Kirby, as Queen Elizabeth II, Prince Philip, and Princess Margaret, respectively. Jared Harris and John Lithgow made supporting turns as King George VI and Winston Churchill. The series received widespread critical acclaim and received multiple Primetime Emmy Award nominations including a wins for Foy for Outstanding Lead Actress in a Drama Series, and Lithgow for Outstanding Supporting Actor in a Drama Series. The casts saw changes for seasons 3 and 4 with Olivia Colman, Tobias Menzies and Helena Bonham Carter replacing, Foy, Smith, and Kirby. Morgan received three Primetime Emmy Award for Outstanding Writing for a Drama Series nominations for writing the episodes, "Assassins" (2016), "Mystery Man" (2017), and "Aberfan" (2019).

On 15 November 2020, the fourth series of The Crown was released to critical acclaim. According to the review-aggregator Rotten Tomatoes, the series holds 95% critics' consensus making it the highest rated series out of the six in total. The season marks the introduction of Emma Corrin as Diana, Princess of Wales, and Morgan's then girlfriend Gillian Anderson as British Prime Minister Margaret Thatcher, with Colman, Menzies, Bonham Carter and Josh O'Connor reprising their roles as Queen Elizabeth II, Prince Philip, Princess Margaret and Prince Charles respectively. The fourth season was awarded the AFI Television Program of the Year for the fourth time in a row, four Golden Globes, including Best TV Series, a Critics' Choice Award for Best Drama, and 10 BAFTA nominations including Best Drama. In September 2021, the fourth season won in all 7 Emmys Drama Categories and earned Netflix its first major win in the history of the streaming giant (Best Drama), with Morgan receiving the award for Outstanding Writing. Prior to that, he received a WGA Award for Best Drama and a PGA Award for Outstanding Producer of Episodic Television, Drama for the fourth season. Season five of The Crown was released in November 2022 with the sixth and final season following in 2023. Imelda Staunton, Jonathan Pryce and Lesley Manville played the respective roles of Queen Elizabeth II, Prince Philip and Princess Margaret. Princess Diana and Prince Charles were played by Elizabeth Debicki and Dominic West.

In May 2022 it was announced that Patriots, Morgan's first play since The Audience would preview at the Almeida Theatre in London from 2 July with an opening night on 12th and performances until 20 August. Set during the 1991 fall of the Soviet Union, Patriots will follow a generation of oligarchs as they try to seize control of a new world. Tom Hollander would lead the cast as businessman Boris Berezovsky. The cast also includes Will Keen as Vladimir Putin, Yolanda Kettle and Luke Thallon. Rupert Goold would direct. On 19 August 2022, after a successful run at the Almeida Theatre it was announced that Patriots would transfer to the Noël Coward Theatre in the West End from May 2023 for a 12-week run. Most of the original cast reprised their role.

In January 2024, it was announced that Patriots would transfer to Broadway for a 12-week limited engagement. Michael Stuhlbarg starred as Berezovsky and Will Keen and Luke Thallon reprised their roles as Putin and Abramovich respectively. Lead producer of the Broadway production was Sonia Friedman. Previews began on 1 April 2024, with opening night on 22 April 2024 at the Ethel Barrymore Theater. The play closed on 23 June 2024.

== Personal life ==
Morgan was appointed Commander of the Order of the British Empire (CBE) in the 2016 New Year Honours for services to drama. In July 2016, Morgan was presented with an honorary degree in Letters by the University of Leeds, his alma mater. In February 2017, he was awarded a British Film Institute Fellowship (BFI). In November 2019, Morgan was honoured by the American Film Institute with a tribute to his career at the AFI FEST 2019. In June 2024 he was honoured with the Creator Tribute Award at the 1st Gotham TV Awards.

In 1997 he married Princess Anna Carolina von Schwarzenberg (b. 1968), daughter of Karel Schwarzenberg (1937–2023), head of the princely House of Schwarzenberg and former Czech foreign minister. They had five children, and separated in 2014.

He has been in a relationship with actress Gillian Anderson since 2016, aside from a short break in 2020.

== Works ==
=== Film ===
Year	Title	Writer	Producer	Notes
1988	Madame Sousatzka	Yes	No	Wrote additional material
1990	Dear Rosie	Yes	No	Short; co-writer
1991	King Ralph	Yes	No	Rewrites
1992	The Silent Touch	Yes	No	Co-written with Mark Wadlow
1998	Martha, Meet Frank, Daniel and Laurence	Yes	No	
2006	The Queen	Yes	No	
2006	The Last King of Scotland	Yes	No	Co-written with Jeremy Brock
2008	The Other Boleyn Girl	Yes	No	
2008	Frost/Nixon	Yes	Executive	
2009	The Damned United	Yes	Executive	
2009	State of Play	Yes	No	Rewrites
2010	Hereafter	Yes	Executive	
2011	360	Yes	No	
2011	Tinker Tailor Soldier Spy	No	Executive	
2013	Rush	Yes	Yes	
2018	Bohemian Rhapsody	Yes	No	
2022	My Father, The Prince	No	Yes	
TBA	Thrilla in Manila	Yes	No	Working title; upcoming Ang Lee film

=== Television ===
Key
†	Denotes television productions that have not yet been released

Year	Title	Writer	Producer	Network	Notes
1989	4 Play	Yes	No	Channel 4	Episode: "Shalom Joan Collins"
1992	Inferno	Yes	No		Television film
1993	Micky Love	Yes	No	ITV	Television film
1997	The Chest	Yes	No	ITV	Television film
2000	Metropolis	Yes	No	ITV	Miniseries; 5 episodes
2002	The Jury	Yes	Executive	ITV	Miniseries; 6 episodes
2003	The Deal	Yes	Associate	Channel 4	Television film
2003	Henry VIII	Yes	Executive	ITV	Television film
2005	Colditz	Yes	No	ITV	Miniseries; 2 episodes
2006	Longford	Yes	Executive	Channel 4	Television film
2010	The Special Relationship	Yes	Executive	HBO	Television film
2013	National Theatre Live: The Audience	Yes	No	National Theatre Live	Television special
2014	The Lost Honour of Christopher Jefferies	Yes	Executive	ITV	Miniseries; 2 episodes
2016–2023	The Crown	Yes	Executive	Netflix	Also creator; 5 seasons, 60 episodes
TBA	The Boys From Brazil †	Yes	Executive	Netflix	Miniseries; 5 episodes

=== Theatre ===
Year	Title	Notes	Theatre
1986	Pax Britannica	co-writer	
2006	Frost/Nixon	playwright	Donmar Warehouse, London
2006	Frost/Nixon	playwright	Gielgud Theatre, West End
2007	Frost/Nixon	playwright	Bernard B. Jacobs Theatre, Broadway
2013	The Audience	playwright	Gielgud Theatre, West End
2015	The Audience	playwright	Gerald Schoenfeld Theatre, Broadway
2015	The Audience	playwright	Apollo Theatre, West End revival
2022	Patriots	playwright	Almeida Theatre, London
2023	Patriots	playwright	Noël Coward Theatre, West End
2024	Patriots	playwright	Ethel Barrymore Theatre, Broadway

== See also ==
- List of British playwrights since 1950
- List of Academy Award winners and nominees from Great Britain
- List of Primetime Emmy Award winners
- List of Golden Globe winners
