= The Deal (2003 film) =

2003 television film directed by Stephen Frears

- DVD cover (Region 2)
- Based on: Blair–Brown deal The Rivals by James Naughtie
- Written by: Peter Morgan
- Directed by: Stephen Frears
- Starring: David Morrissey; Michael Sheen
- Theme music composer: Nathan Larson
- Country of origin: United Kingdom

Production
- Producer: Christine Langan
- Cinematography: Alwin H. Küchler
- Editor: Lucia Zucchetti
- Running time: 76 mins.
- Production company: Granada Television
- Budget: $3 million

Original release
- Network: Channel 4
- Release: 28 September 2003

The Deal is a 2003 British television film directed by Stephen Frears from a script by Peter Morgan, based in part upon The Rivals by James Naughtie. The film depicts the Blair–Brown deal, a well-documented pact that Tony Blair and Gordon Brown made, whereby Brown would not stand in the 1994 Labour Party leadership election, so that Blair could have a clear run at becoming leader of the party and later Prime Minister instead. The film begins in 1983, as Blair and Brown were first elected to Parliament, and ends in 1994 at the Granita restaurant—the location of the supposed agreement—with a brief epilogue following the leadership contest.

The film stars David Morrissey and Michael Sheen as Brown and Blair respectively. It was first proposed by Morgan in late 2002 and was taken on by Granada Television for ITV. After Frears agreed to direct, and the cast were signed on, ITV pulled out of it over fears that the political sensitivity could affect its corporate merger. Channel 4 picked up the production and filming was carried out for five weeks in May 2003. The film was broadcast on 28 September 2003, the weekend prior to the Labour Party's annual party conference.

The film was critically acclaimed. Morrissey received considerable praise, winning a Royal Television Society award for playing Brown, and Frears was nominated for Outstanding Directorial Achievement in Television Movie/Serial by the Directors Guild of Great Britain. The film also nominated for an International Emmy for Best TV Movie/Miniseries. Sheen later reprised his role as Blair twice, in The Queen (2006), which depicts the death of Diana, Princess of Wales in 1997, and in The Special Relationship (2010), which chronicles the special relationship between Blair and U.S. President Bill Clinton.

== Plot ==
In the prologue, opening in medias res, shows Gordon Brown (David Morrissey) taking a telephone call from Tony Blair (Michael Sheen) to arrange a meeting at the Granita restaurant in Islington.

The narrative shifts to 1983; in the wake of the Falklands War, Prime Minister Margaret Thatcher and her Conservative government enjoy huge public popularity as the general election approaches, while Labour's left-wing election manifesto loses them key voters. Whilst the Conservatives win a landslide victory, building upon their existing majority, Brown is elected as the new Member of Parliament for Dunfermline East in Scotland. In London, he is shown to his office in the Houses of Parliament. John Smith (Frank Kelly), a senior Labour MP, introduces Brown to Blair, his new office-mate and the new MP for Sedgefield. Blair makes pleasantries with Brown and, though Brown is not initially impressed, the two become friends. Smith soon introduces the pair to Peter Mandelson (Paul Rhys), Neil Kinnock's director of communications. Shortly afterwards, Kinnock appoints Blair to be an assistant Treasury spokesman. Brown turns down a promotion to the Scottish Office, hoping a better position will come along. He and Blair discuss their political futures and both agree that, of the two, Brown would make a better leader of the party.

Labour is unable to make significant dents in the Conservative majority at the 1987 general election, with the Tories dropping by only 0.2% in the national share of the vote compared to 1983. Kinnock promotes Smith to Shadow Chancellor of the Exchequer, with Brown as his "number two". Three years later, Thatcher resigns as Prime Minister, having been toppled from within the Conservative Party, and Brown asserts his view that a Labour victory in the next election will be possible. Despite contrary predictions, the Conservatives led by John Major win the 1992 general election and secure the most votes ever recorded for a political party in British history. Blair tells Brown that a new approach is needed, and that Brown should stand for the party leadership. Brown refuses to stand against Smith, his friend and mentor. Mandelson privately suggests to Brown that Blair should stand as leader but Brown ridicules the idea. Smith is elected and, over the next two years, Labour gains support as scandals rock the government – but both Blair and Brown are concerned that Smith's "one more heave" strategy of allowing Conservative unpopularity to hand the next election victory to Labour is not radical enough. Blair, as Shadow Home Secretary, pledges to be "tough on crime, tough on the causes of crime" in the wake of the murder of James Bulger. During a late-night conversation about the future direction of the party, Smith tells a clearly irritated Brown that he sees Blair as his natural successor.

A year later, Smith suffers a fatal heart attack. Blair, encouraged by his wife Cherie (Elizabeth Berrington), decides to stand in the leadership contest. He later meets with Mandelson to tell him that he has received support from key Labour frontbenchers. Previously a supporter of Brown, Mandelson switches his allegiance to Blair. Brown is furious that Blair has gone back on what he perceives as having been an unwritten understanding between the two that Brown was the stronger candidate for the leadership, but Blair is incredulous – believing that the circumstances have changed enormously in the intervening years. Smith's funeral passes, and Blair's camp is sure that Brown will run. Charlie Whelan (Dexter Fletcher) and Ed Balls (Matt Blair) advise Brown that he will receive support from significant trade unions. Blair decides to arrange a meeting with Brown. At Granita, Blair tells Brown that he will run for the leadership, and in return offers Brown unprecedented power as his Chancellor should they win the next election, also offering Brown sweeping control of social policy. Brown asks what Blair's plan is should Labour win a second term in office, and Blair responds that he would not make the same mistake as Margaret Thatcher and "go on too long," agreeing to offer his support to Brown as his successor. Brown agrees and Mandelson prepares a statement from him, but discards Brown's alterations. The leadership contest is won by Blair.

== Production ==
=== Writing ===
The film was commissioned in 2002 by ITV's head of drama Nick Elliott, who encouraged Peter Morgan to put aside any other projects and start work on a script as soon as possible. Granada was initially sceptical of producing it; the company's executive chairman and chief executive—Charles Allen and Simon Shaps respectively—believed that Blair would be forced to resign as Prime Minister over the impending war in Iraq, consequently leaving the story outdated. The project was believed to be "too cerebral" and attempts were made to persuade Morgan to develop a television series to replace Cold Feet, another Granada production. John Whiston and Andy Harries convinced Allen and Shaps otherwise, citing Granada's history of producing ground-breaking drama and film as reasons for why The Deal should be made. ITV's director of channels, David Liddiment, who supported the production, resigned in December 2002 and was replaced by Nigel Pickard, who shared the concerns of Allen and Shaps. Peter Morgan wrote his first script draft in the three weeks preceding Christmas 2002. Recent events such as the 2001 foot and mouth outbreak and the contention surrounding the September Dossier made him believe that the perceived adversity between Brown and Blair was no longer in the public consciousness. His opinion was changed when he watched the 2002 Labour Party Conference and saw a "thunderous expression" on Brown's face as Bill Clinton praised Blair in his speech; Morgan realised that the rivalry was not over. This draft was extremely sympathetic to Brown, focusing on what Morgan called "Gordon's heartbreak". Subsequent rewrites toned down this approach, though Brown still remained the "main character".

"With most English dramas about politics, you expect either satire or a story with a very strong agenda. What you get here is an emotional piece. This story would interest me every bit as much if it was about two people going for a promotion to be the foreman in a baked bean factory—and one got the job while the other didn't but should have done."

— Peter Morgan.

The relationship between Brown and Blair as depicted in the script was based on that between Aaron Altman and Tom Grunick, the characters portrayed by Albert Brooks and William Hurt in Broadcast News. Morgan wanted to set the entire film in the 12 days following the death of John Smith, but the time frame was widened because the Labour Party's disastrous result at the 1992 general election was "absolutely crucial" to the relationship and motives of the main characters; Morgan had to show the moment Blair decided to aim to become leader of the party. Morgan and the producers engaged in a lengthy research process during script writing and editing, interviewing 40 to 50 of Brown and Blair's closest friends and advisors, as well as aides involved in the 1992 and 1997 elections. Significantly, many of the facts in the film are based on the first three chapters of James Naughtie's book The Rivals: The Intimate Portrait of a Political Marriage. The film briefly adopted The Rivals as a working title, but soon reverted to The Deal. Another title considered by Frears was Bambi and Stalin, based on a line in a speech given by Blair in 1995.

Scenes set in the House of Commons chamber and committee rooms use the actual words as recorded in Hansard. In other scenes Morgan utilised dramatic licence, conceding that there was no evidence to suggest that any of the lines spoken elsewhere in the film were ever said in real life. The relationship between Brown and Blair received many thematic analogies; Morgan likened Brown's story to a "tragedy of an over-qualified Scot, who the Labour Party probably rightly felt at the time that it could not have as its leader." Despite the quote at the head of the film referring to Butch Cassidy and the Sundance Kid, Frears wryly likened Brown and Blair to Beavis and Butt-Head. Producer Christine Langan alluded to both Shakespearean and Biblical themes, painting Brown and Blair as Cain and Abel.

=== Casting ===
At the time of commissioning, Douglas Henshall and Daniel Craig were considered for the parts of Brown and Blair respectively, though David Morrissey and Michael Sheen were eventually announced as the leads in March 2003. Morrissey gained two stone for his role and had his hair permed and dyed. He researched Brown's background by travelling to Kirkcaldy—where Brown grew up—and reviewing numerous biographies and information about the Treasury. In comparison to his preparation for the BBC thriller State of Play, Morrissey discovered that no politicians wanted to help him with his research, so he turned to journalists Jon Snow and Simon Hoggart. Director Stephen Frears was unfamiliar with his previous work and had to be convinced by other production staff to cast him.

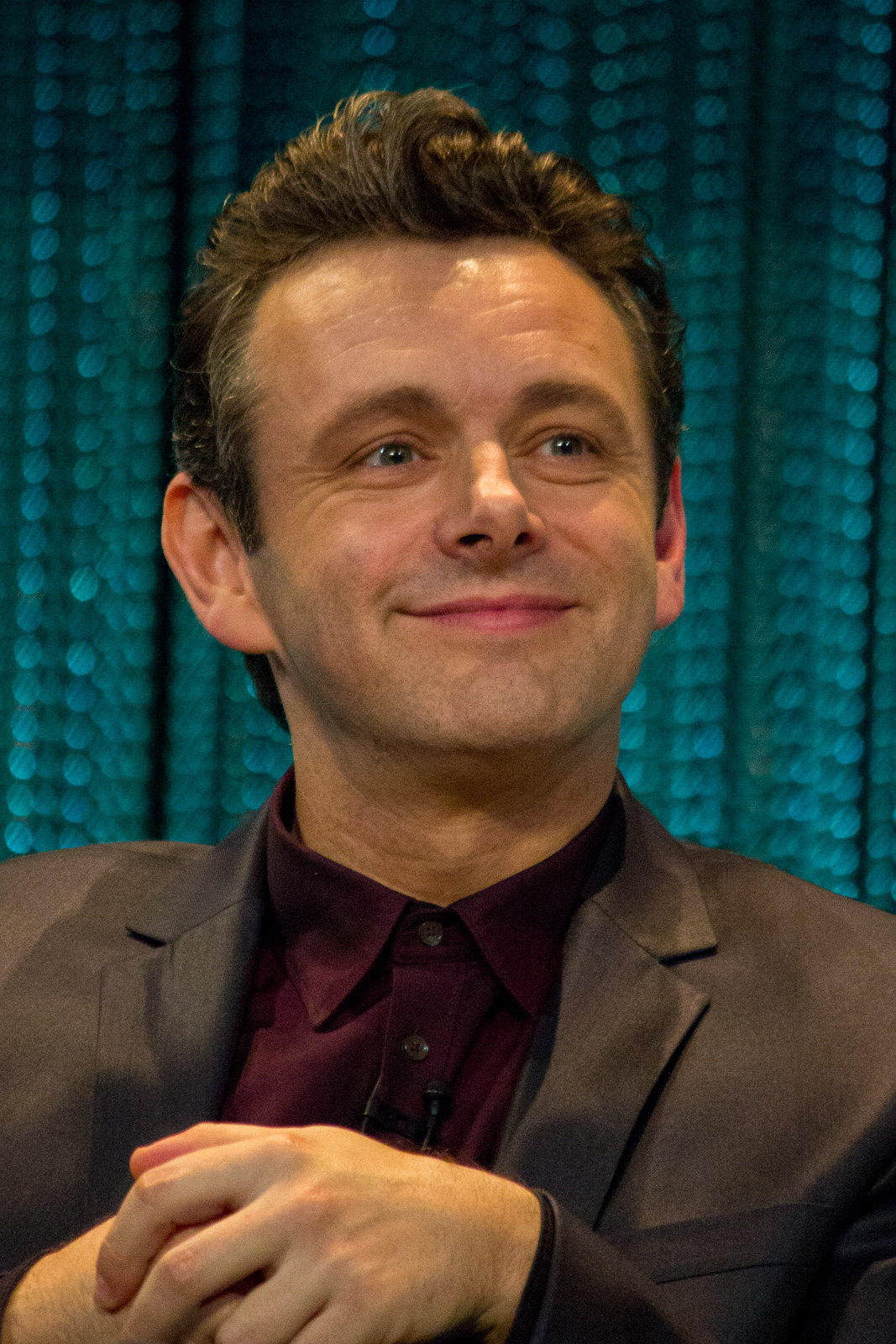
Michael Sheen made his first of three appearances as Tony Blair in The Deal

Sheen worked with an accent coach to effectively mimic Blair's speech style, although he and Morrissey avoided doing simple impersonations of the men they played. Sheen cited Will Smith's title performance of Ali as a basis for his part; despite playing a real-life figure, he treated the role as if it were any other character. Sheen had made his film debut in Frears' Mary Reilly (1996), and although he was unsure whether his minor role had "burned into [Frears'] brain", Frears confirmed that he had remembered Sheen from that. Frears' casting director approached Sheen in the audience of a play, inviting him to appear in "a love story about Tony Blair and Gordon Brown". An informal meeting was scheduled between Frears and Sheen, at the end of which Sheen was cast as Blair.

Paul Rhys studied Donald Macintyre's 1999 biography of Peter Mandelson and gained an appreciation of the politician's work on the Northern Ireland peace process, and of his sexuality. Rhys portrayed Mandelson with a "myopic loyalty" and identified him as "remain[ing] preposterously loyal to Blair" after his defection from Kinnock and Brown. The representation of Mandelson was compared to both Iago and Pandarus. Other people associated with Blair and Brown who appear in the film are Anji Hunter, Blair's assistant (played by Glenna Morrison), journalist Sheena McDonald (played by Valerie Edmond), and Sue Nye, Brown's assistant (played by Joanna Scanlan).

=== Filming ===
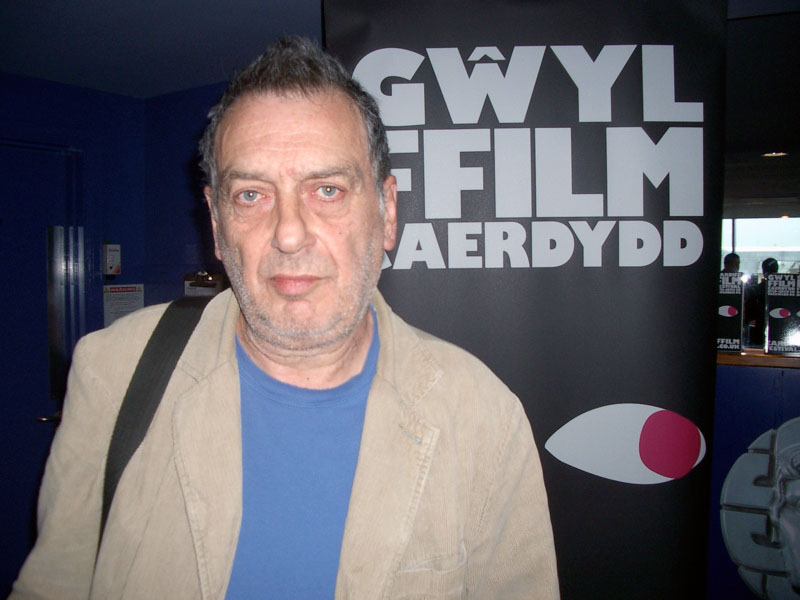
Stephen Frears directed The Deal

In March 2003, shortly before filming began, ITV abandoned its plan to screen the film, citing fears that such a politically sensitive film could affect the Granada-Carlton corporate merger, which was due to go before the government's Competition Commission. Within 24 hours, Channel 4 backed the production. A£2 million budget was assigned to the film. Filming was postponed until May to accommodate Sheen's rehearsal schedule for the play Caligula. Frears ended shooting at 6 p.m. each day, so Sheen could leave the set-in time to appear in the play at the Donmar Warehouse. The shoot was scheduled for five weeks. Set design was carried out by Michael Pickwood, a longtime production designer for Granada.

The Blairs' house in Sedgefield, Myrobella, was "played" by a house formerly owned by Quintin Hogg, Kettlethorpe Hall in Lincolnshire. The Maughan Library was used as the Houses of Parliament, along with the real-life scene in London. The scene in which John Smith eats with Brown was filmed on Blackfriars Bridge on the River Thames. The prologue and climactic scene in the Granita restaurant were shot on location in the restaurant itself.

Certain personal effects of the characters that were familiar to the public were added to the sets. Frears subdued Berrington's performance to avoid portraying Cherie as too much of a Lady Macbeth figure; in the scene where Cherie encourages Blair to stand for the leadership, Frears had Berrington stand with her back towards the camera. Editing and post-production went on until September. Some historical events—such as the Sheffield Rally and footage of the 1997 general election—were too costly to refilm so archive footage was used instead. Adam Curtis assisted in the editing of the archive footage.

== Release ==
After John Yorke recommissioned the film for Channel 4, it was scheduled as part of a "Tony Blair season". The Deal aired on 28 September 2003, the day before the Labour Party Conference began in Bournemouth. Despite heavy media attention, the broadcast was seen by only 1.5 million viewers.

The film received a screening at the San Francisco Film Festival on 5 May 2007, following an interview with Peter Morgan. International rights for North America and Australasia were purchased from Channel 4 International by The Weinstein Company in 2007, who sold it to American cable network HBO. HBO screened The Deal on 8 November 2007. Channel 4 released it on region 2 DVD on 19 May 2008 under its 4dvd brand. Genius Products, an imprint of The Weinstein Company, released The Deal on region 1 DVD on 29 July 2008. The region 1 edition features an audio commentary by Morgan and Langan, and an interview with Frears.

The ending of the film was changed for the American release; a closing caption that had read "Gordon is still waiting [for the leadership]" was replaced by one that says that Brown became Prime Minister in 2007, thirteen years after the Granita meeting. Despite these changes, the copyright date on the film remains 2003. HBO promoted it as "a new movie... from the makers of The Queen" and the DVD was marketed as "The Prequel to The Queen", even though the film was made and originally released before The Queen.

== Reception ==
Reviews of the film following a press screening were generally positive. The Guardian published a number of reviews by politicians and political aides; Charlie Whelan called it "enjoyable, if not entirely accurate", complaining that he was portrayed unsympathetically in comparison to Peter Mandelson—"the Prince of Darkness". Whelan was highly complimentary of Morrissey's performance, but criticised Morgan's script for portraying Brown as he was publicly perceived. Michael Portillo, the Secretary of State for Defence during the time that Blair was Leader of the Opposition, wrote a positive account of the film, using his review as a platform to recall the events surrounding the 1992 general election. Tim Allan, Blair's deputy press secretary for four years, called it "cracking stuff", highlighting the leads' performances and the fact-based nature of the script.

Mark Davies, the political reporter for BBC News Online, criticised the script's bias towards Brown and Sheen's apparently negative performance; "Michael Sheen at first plays Blair in the style of Spitting Image's David Steel puppet: bounding along next to his far superior colleague like an over-eager puppy. The actor later transforms Blair into something more sinister and cynical […] Think Rik Mayall's Alan B'stard." As with other critics, Davies admired Morrissey's performance, singling out the actor's grasp of Brown's physical tics. For the Daily Express, James Rampton singled out the balance of drama and humour. Upon broadcast in the United States—and in retrospect of The Queen—The Boston Globe's Matthew Gilbert called it "tightly written and effectively acted, and yet it still plays more like a docudramatic re-creation than a Shakespearean glimpse at brotherly tension." Of Morrissey, Gilbert wrote "He brings depth to Brown, a Scot, as a moody, private workaholic whose passion is in ideas and not in performing to the public."

The drama won the British Academy Television Award for Best Single Drama and Morrissey won the RTS Programme Award for Male Actor. It was nominated in the RTS category for Best Single Drama and the International Emmy Award category for Best TV Movie or Miniseries. Frears was nominated in the Outstanding Directorial Achievement in Television Movie/Serial category at the inaugural Directors Guild of Great Britain awards.

== Follow-ups ==
=== The Queen (2006) ===
Frears had a clause in his contract that allowed him to direct any sequels. The success of The Deal prompted the production team to consider a new film, possibly surrounding Britain's commitment to the war in Iraq. In 2004, production was announced that the first follow-up would be produced for a theatrical film release in 2006, The Queen; that dramatises the weeks following the death of Diana, Princess of Wales on 31 August 1997. Langan described the film as not being a direct sequel, only that it reunited the same creative team.

=== The Special Relationship (2010) ===
A second follow-up was written by Morgan, The Special Relationship chronicles the special relationship between Blair and US President Bill Clinton from 1997 to 2001. The film was first proposed by Morgan as the third chapter in a "Blair trilogy", shortly after The Queen was released and Blair's resignation, and would have covered Blair's special relationship with Clinton and also George W. Bush. There was early speculation that Left Bank Pictures and BBC Films would be involved in production, as Morgan had "promised" the script to Christine Langan and Andy Harries. By December 2008, it had been announced that Kathleen Kennedy would be producing and Morgan would be directing. In March 2009, it was announced that Dennis Quaid would play the role of Clinton and Hope Davis would portray his wife Hillary. Morgan pulled out of directing the film in June 2009 and was replaced by Richard Loncraine. Filming on location in London ran from 20 July to 4 September 2009. The film, a Rainmark Films production for HBO Films and BBC Films was first broadcast on the HBO networks in North America on 29 May 2010.

=== Possible Brown film ===
In a radio interview with Kate Silverton in August 2010, Andy Harries spoke of early plans for a television film about "the Brown exit", though explained that such a film was "two or three years away".

== See also ==
- Cultural depictions of Tony Blair
