= John Osborne (writer) =

English writer (born 1981)

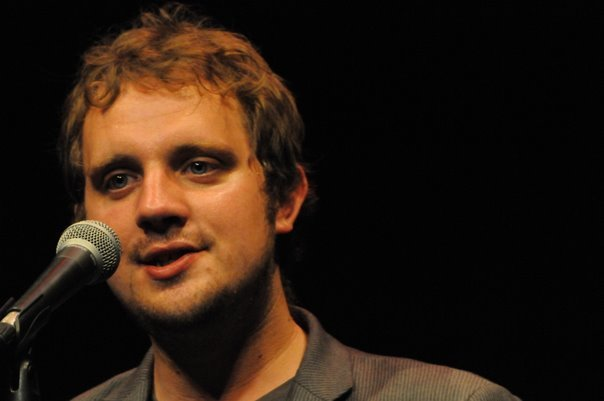
- Osborne in 2009
- Born: 15 December 1981 (age 44); Scunthorpe, England
- Occupation: Writer
- Website: johnosbornewriter.co.uk

John Osborne (born 15 December 1981) is an English writer. He writes theatre shows, audio pieces, poems, scripts and stories. He co-created the Sky 1 comedy drama After Hours. He is based in Norwich, United Kingdom and studied at the University of East Anglia.

He created the sell out Edinburgh show John Peel's Shed and has written and performed six thirty minute storytelling shows for Radio 4.

He is the author of three non-fiction books. His first, Radio Head: Up and Down the Dial of British Radio, was published by Simon & Schuster in May 2009 and was selected as Book of the Week on BBC Radio 4. It includes interviews with key people from the history of British radio, including Nicholas Parsons, Mark Radcliffe and Stuart Maconie. The book was reviewed in The Daily Telegraph, and Scotland on Sunday. His second book, The Newsagent's Window: Adventures in a World of Second-Hand Cars and Lost Cats, was published in April 2010 and was awarded best memoir at the East Anglian Book of the Year awards.

His third book, Don't Need the Sunshine, was published by AA Publishing in May 2013 and was adapted for broadcast on BBC Radio 4.

His poetry collection To Make People Happy was published by Mariscat Press in 2025 and shortlisted for the East Anglian Book of the Year awards.

In 2026 he was commissioned by the National Centre for Writing as Writer in Residence for the 900th anniversary of Norwich market. For this he wrote a poem for every market stall, with some of the poems displayed on boards at Norwich market.

== After Hours ==
Together with Molly Naylor he created the Sky 1 sitcom After Hours. The theme song was specially recorded by Pete Doherty and is a cover of the Velvet Underground song "After Hours". It was the last onscreen appearance of Caroline Aherne, who made a brief cameo in the show.

The show is about two twenty somethings who have their own radio show on a canal boat in Lincolnshire. It stars Jaime Winstone, Ardal O'Hanlon, Georgina Campbell and John Thomson. After Hours is produced and directed by Craig Cash. The show's first series was first broadcast in autumn 2015.

After Hours is available to view on NOW TV in the UK.

== Radio 4 ==
Osborne makes radio shows, and is the writer of six Radio 4 half-hour comedy shows including John Peel's Shed (2011), The Newsagent's Window, Valentine's Day (both 2013) and The New Blur Album (2014). John Peel's Shed was an adaptation of Osborne's sell-out Edinburgh show. The Newsagent's Window was "Pick of the Week" in the Radio Times as chosen by journalist Eddie Mair.

Valentine's Day stars Suki Webster, Ann Beach and Isy Suttie, and is the story of a chef, Sean, who recounts his life by looking through his old Valentine's Day cards. The New Blur Album was Radio 4's "Comedy of the Week" and was a life story as told through the release of each new Blur album. In 2015, the shows The Kindness of Strangers and Don't Need the Sunshine were broadcast.

In 2016, he contributed to the Radio 4 shows Short Cuts and Four Thought, and together with actress Laura Woodward he made The 1998 David Bowie fanclub picnic, broadcast on Future Radio in 2017. He has made two audio documentaries for the Wellcome Trust: Homesickness in the Modern Age and The Worst Sound in the World.

In 2025 he made an episode of The Food Programme for Radio 4: In Search of Mustard in Norwich, where together with producer Polly Weston he researched the history of Colman's Mustard in Norwich.

== Poetry ==
Osborne regularly appears at venues across the country performing poetry. Since 2006, he has performed at the Glastonbury and Latitude festivals, as well as venues such as The Roundhouse, Norwich Arts Centre and Underbelly. He is a member of the poetry collective Aisle16, who run Homework, a monthly night of literary cabaret at Bethnal Green Working Men's Club. Homework has featured performances by Kate Nash, Tim Key and Jon Ronson. Aisle16 have been described by The Sunday Times as "highlights of the spoken word scene".

His first collection of poetry Most People Aren't That Happy, Anyway was published by Nasty Little Press in 2013 and a poem from the collection was highly commended in that year's prestigious Forward Prize. His second collection No-one Cares About Your New Thing was published in 2017 by Go Faster Stripe. His 2021 collection A Supermarket Love Story, also published by Go Faster Stripe, included The Alcohol Aisle which was longlisted for the 2020 National Poetry Competition. In 2024 he published To Make People Happy, his first pamphlet with Edinburgh-based Mariscat Press. In early 2025 he published a book of poems about Norwich: All Shall Be Well, 'poems written in the cafes and pubs of Norwich'.

Osborne has had poetry published in The Guardian, The Spectator, The Rialto and The Big Issue and broadcast on BBC Radio 3, Radio 4, XFM, Soho Radio, 6Music and Radio 1.

Until 2026 he presented Stress Test, a monthly poetry show on Soho Radio produced by Rough Trade Books, alongside Martha Sprackland, Ella Frears and Joe Dunthorne. Live editions of the show featured musicians including Emmy The Great and Aidan Moffatt.

He has been involved in shows at the Edinburgh Fringe festival including The Mid 90s la la la with Patrick Lappin (2008), The 100 Greatest Beekeepers in Switzerland, ever! (2010), John Peel's Shed (2011), Aisle16 r Kool (2011), On The Beach (2013), Most People Aren't That Happy, Anyway (2015), Circled in The Radio Times (2017), You're in a Bad Way (2019), 'My Car Plays Tapes' (2021) and a live show of Stress Test at the 2023 Edinburgh Book Festival with special guest Aidan Moffat.

== John Peel's Shed ==
In 2002, Osborne won a box of records in a competition on John Peel's Radio One show. In 2010 he presented a show on the Norwich community station Future Radio where he played some of his favourite tracks from the collection. This was then turned into John Peel's Shed—a stage show for the 2011 Edinburgh Fringe festival, where it enjoyed a complete sell out and five star reviews. In 2012, the show completed a sixty date UK tour, including a run at the Soho Theatre and performances at festivals including Latitude, Glastonbury and Green Man.

== Theatre ==
After the success of John Peel's Shed, Osborne continued writing for the theatre. On The Beach debuted at the Pleasance Dome at the 2013 Edinburgh Festival and Circled in The Radio Times for the 2017 Fringe. In 2017, he toured Circled in The Radio Times, which premiered at the Latitude festival. In 2019, You're in a Bad Way, a storytelling show about music, dementia and getting older was performed at the Voodoo Rooms at the Edinburgh Festival Fringe.

In 2021, My Car Plays Tapes, his fifth theatre show, debuted at the Edinburgh festival, performed at a specially made Covid friendly stage at Summerhall.

In 2023, following the announcement that Blur were reforming for some special performances, Osborne brought back his theatre show The New Blur Album.

In 2024, his show Norwich: A Love Story premiered at Norwich Playhouse with a sell-out show featuring local artwork and singers and a celebration of Norwich jazz singer Beryl Bryden. The pre-show and post-show playlist was composed entirely of Norwich related singers and musicians. The show was later performed at Machynlleth Comedy Festival, First Light festival in Lowestoft and Norwich's Bridewell Museum.

He is a regular on rural touring schemes, and performs his shows in village halls, pubs, community centres and libraries across the UK.

His Christmas shows There Will Be Tinsel and Step Into Christmas toured in 2025 and 2026.

== Reviews ==
John has been reviewed by prominent journalists and publications including: Gillian Reynolds of The Daily Telegraph, The Observer, Martin Kelner for The Guardian, and Fordyce Maxwell on Scotland on Sunday.

He has appeared as a guest on radio shows including Geoff Lloyd's Absolute Radio Hometime Show, Jeremy Vine on Radio 2, Richard Bacon on BBC Radio 5 Live, Colin Murray on Radio 1, Shaun Keaveny and Stuart Maconie on 6Music, Fred MacAulay on BBC Radio Scotland, The Verb on Radio 3 and Nikki Bedi on the BBC Asian Network. He has also been a guest on an episode of Scroobius Pip's Distraction Pieces podcast.

== Teaching ==
Osborne has worked in schools and universities in England, Germany and Austria. He offers creative writing workshops and with rural touring schemes has spent time running writing sessions for people with dementia and their families.

Since 2013, he has been a patron of the Dignity in Dying campaign, performing at their showcase event at the Union Chapel in London alongside Sir Andrew Motion, Terry Pratchett and Simon Armitage. As well as writing he worked as a support worker for Mencap for four years, which he wrote about in his book and theatre show My Car Plays Tapes.

Osborne is a fully qualified primary school teacher and has taught in schools in Norfolk and Suffolk. In 2025 he was a mentor on the National Literary Trust's Young Poet Laureate scheme, working with young writers across the East of England.
