= Grace Petrie =

English singer-songwriter and guitarist (born 1987)

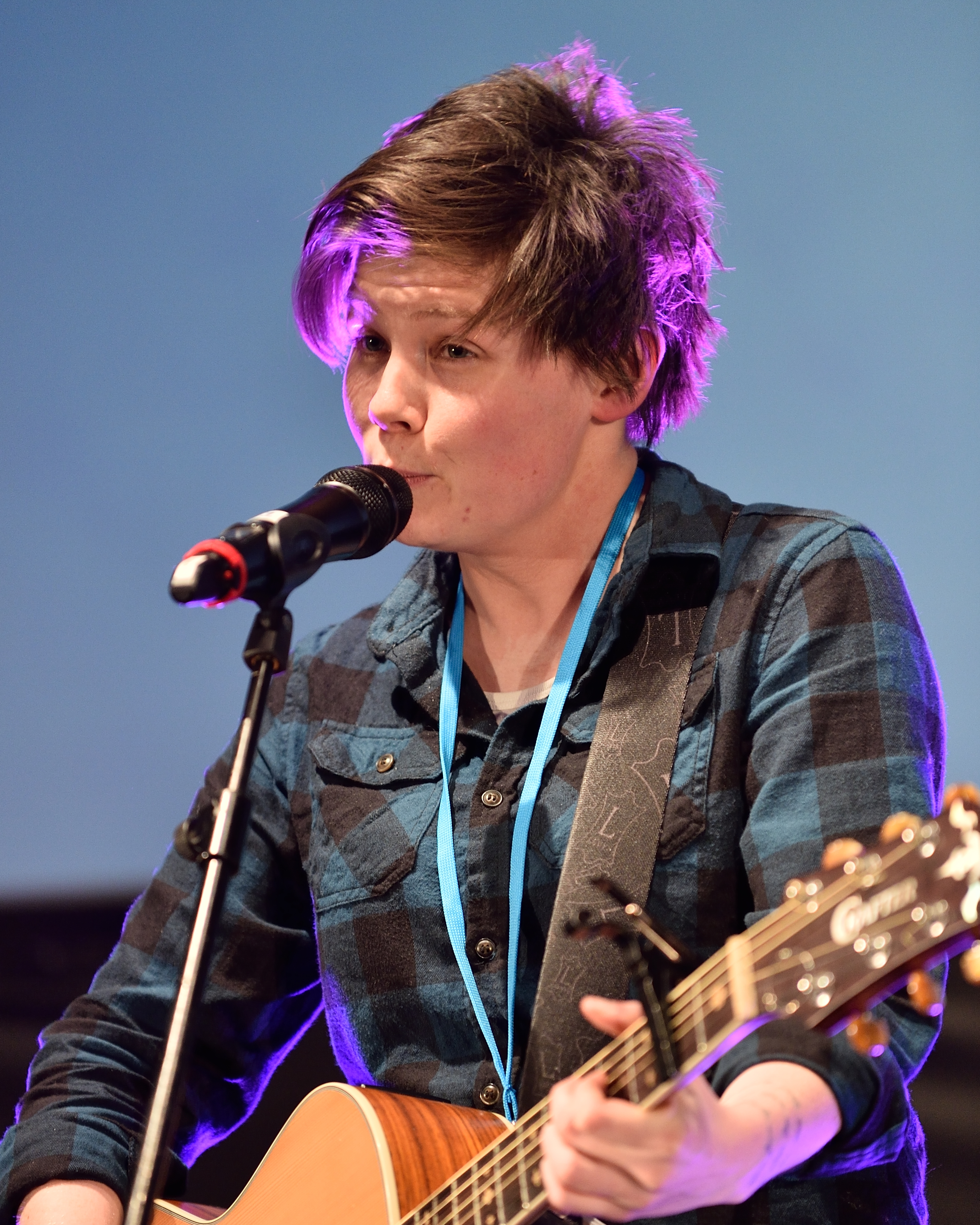
- Petrie performing at QED 2016

Background information
- Born: 24 July 1987 (age 39)
- Origin: Leicester, England
- Genre: Folk
- Occupation: Singer-songwriter
- Instruments: Vocals, guitar
- Years active: 2006–present
- Spouse: Molly Naylor (m. 2024)
- Website: gracepetrie.com Grace Petrie's voice Recorded October 2016

Grace Petrie (/ˈpitri/, born 24 July 1987) is an English folk singer-songwriter and guitarist from Leicester, England. She was hailed in The Guardian as "a powerful new songwriting voice" in 2011.

== Biography ==
Grace Petrie began performing in 2006 as a solo vocalist and acoustic guitarist, and self-released an eponymous album that year, followed in 2007 by second album Feeling Better. In 2010, the advent of the Conservative-led coalition government following the (UK) general election influenced Petrie, who is a socialist, feminist, and lesbian, towards an increasing emphasis on politically focused songwriting, from a left-wing perspective. She made her debut appearance on Glastonbury's Leftfield stage at the invitation of Billy Bragg in summer 2010, and widely praised third album Tell Me A Story followed, including signature song "Farewell to Welfare".

In 2011, Petrie toured with comedian Josie Long. Fourth album Mark My Words followed, including the song "Emily Davison Blues" – a comment on media reaction to the 2011 riots. A special film directed by Chris Shepherd for the song "Rise" from the same album was screened on Channel 4 as part of the TV series Random Acts. In 2012, Petrie took part in the "Anti-Capitalist Roadshow" alongside Roy Bailey, Robb Johnson, Leon Rosselson, Peggy Seeger and others. She has also performed gigs with other political folk artists such as Chris T-T, David Rovics and Dick Gaughan, as well as political indie/punk rock bands like Thee Faction and Colour Me Wednesday.

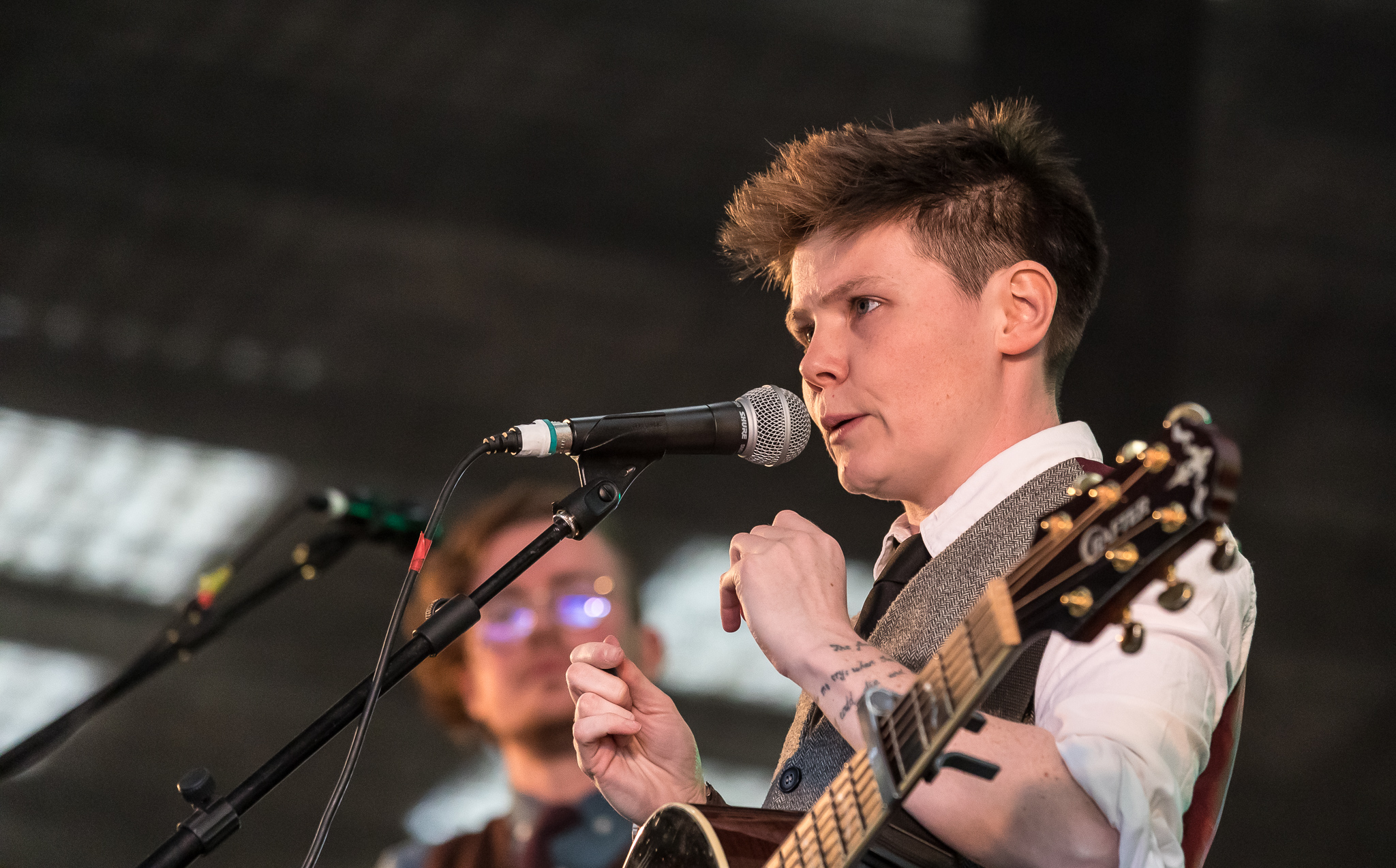
Petrie at the Purbeck Valley Folk Festival in 2021

In 2013, Petrie released her fifth album Love is My Rebellion with new backing band The Benefits Culture, consisting of Jess Greengrass (percussion) and Caitlin Field (bass).

Petrie has made an annual appearance at Glastonbury since 2010 as well as regularly playing festivals such as Towersey, Greenbelt Festival, Latitude and others. She has toured nationally with Emmy the Great, Billy Bragg and comedian Robin Ince, and has made several appearances on BBC Radio 4's The Now Show. In 2014, a live concert recorded at St. Pancras Old Church was released on CD and DVD.

She released the album Whatever's Left in 2015, followed by Heart First Aid Kit in 2017 and Queer as Folk in 2018.

In 2016, Petrie along with numerous other celebrities, toured the UK to support Jeremy Corbyn's bid to become Prime Minister.

During the COVID-19 lockdown in 2021, Petrie played a live gig at Leicester Cathedral that was streamed on YouTube.

Petrie's sixth studio album, Connectivity, was released in autumn 2021, and saw the singer break the UK Top 40 for the first time, reaching Number 37 in the Official Albums Chart, number two in the independent albums chart and number one in the downloads chart.

On 8 March 2024, Petrie released her seventh studio album, Build Something Better, produced by Frank Turner. The album reached Number 28 in the Official UK Albums Chart, her highest chart placing to date.

== Discography ==
=== Albums ===
- Grace Petrie (2006)
- Feel Better (2007)
- Tell Me a Story (2010)
- Mark My Words (2011)
- Love Is My Rebellion (2013)
- Whatever's Left (2015)
- Heart First Aid Kit (2017)
- Queer as Folk (2018)
- Connectivity (2021) – UK Albums Chart number 37
- Build Something Better (2024) – UK Albums Chart number 28

=== Live albums ===
- Live at St. Pancras Old Church (2014)

=== EPs ===
- There's No Such Thing as a Protest Singer (2016)
