= Midnight Entity =

Fictional character in Doctor Who

- Doctor Who character
- First appearance: "Midnight" (2008)
- Created by: Russell T Davies
- Portrayed by: Lesley Sharp; Paul Kasey

The Midnight Entity is a being that appears in the British science fiction television programme Doctor Who. First appearing in the 2008 episode "Midnight", the Entity attacks a tour bus on the planet Midnight, with the Entity possessing a woman named Sky Silvestry (Lesley Sharp). The Entity proceeds to mimic the voices of the other passengers, including the Tenth Doctor (David Tennant), with the Entity eventually taking control over the Doctor. The passengers on the bus attempt to throw the Doctor out of the bus, but due to the sacrifice of a hostess (Rakie Ayola), the Entity is stopped and the Doctor is freed. It reappears in the 2025 episode "The Well", where, hundreds of thousands of years after "Midnight", it attacks a mining colony set up on the planet. Now hiding behind people and whispering into their ears to play games with them, the Entity encounters the Fifteenth Doctor (Ncuti Gatwa). Though the Entity is seemingly banished back into the titular well, the episode implies it was able to escape onto an expedition team's spaceship, and survive.

Created by writer Russell T Davies, the Entity was conceived after he had a conversation with a producer for the series and the two accidentally ended up repeating each other's words. Its return in "The Well" was initially not planned, and only done after a plan by Davies to use Nigerian spirits called Orishas as antagonists fell through. Seeing that the actions of the antagonist in the story fit the general behaviors of the Entity, Davies elected to bring the Entity back for the story. The Entity has been considered one of the most terrifying antagonists in the show's history, with many critics praising the ambiguity of the creature, particularly via its lack of physical form, as helping to create a memorable, impactful antagonist. Its return in "The Well" received more mixed responses; some critics felt it was a solid return for the Entity, though others felt it did not follow up on the initial impact of the Entity in "Midnight" effectively.

== Appearances ==
Doctor Who is a long-running British science-fiction television series that began in 1963. It stars its protagonist, The Doctor, an alien who travels through time and space in a ship known as the TARDIS, as well as their travelling companions. When the Doctor dies, they are able to undergo a process known as "regeneration", completely changing the Doctor's appearance and personality. Throughout their travels, the Doctor often comes into conflict with various aliens and antagonist.

The Midnight Entity has little known about it in-universe. The 2008-2010 web series Captain Jack's Monster Files refers to it having a physical form, and that it "can eat its way into the brain and take over the speech of its host." The Entity in "Midnight" is capable of mimicking the speech of others, though its subsequent appearance in "The Well" has it perform entirely different actions, instead whispering into the ears of others to drive them mad as it hides just behind them, out of sight of other people. It also has the ability to throw its victims around, which is strong enough to kill them.

The Midnight Entity first appears in 2008's "Midnight". In the episode, the Tenth Doctor (David Tennant) embarks on a tour of the planet Midnight alongside other passengers. Midnight is covered in diamonds, but the intense radiation means nothing can survive on the planet's surface. The Entity is able to enter the tour bus and possesses a woman named Sky Silvestry (Lesley Sharp) who begins to mimic the words of the other passengers. Eventually, she is able to speak in unison with them. While attempting to calm the situation, the Doctor seems to come under the Entity's control, and the panicked passengers want him thrown out of the bus and into the radiation, which would kill him. The tour's hostess (Rakie Ayola) realises that the Entity is still controlling Sky, and she throws herself and Sky out onto the planet's surface, which kills both of them, and the Entity does not re-enter the bus.

The Entity re-appears in "The Well" (2025). Set on the planet Midnight hundreds of thousands of years after the events of its first appearance, the Entity apparently escaped from a well which exists in a mining colony. The entire crew died from the Entity's games, leaving only Aliss (Rose Ayling-Ellis), the crew's deaf cook, alive, due to her being unable to hear its whispering. The Entity attached to her, hiding behind her. When a team arrived to investigate what happened on the colony, the Entity killed anyone who walked directly behind Aliss, not wanting to be seen. After a stand-off, the Entity apparently grabbed onto the Fifteenth Doctor's (Ncuti Gatwa) companion Belinda Chandra (Varada Sethu). Shaya (Caoilfhionn Dunne), the group's leader, apparently forces the Entity onto her back and jumps back into the well, seemingly defeating it. Despite this, the episode's ending implies the creature latched onto another soldier, allowing it to escape the planet.

== Development ==
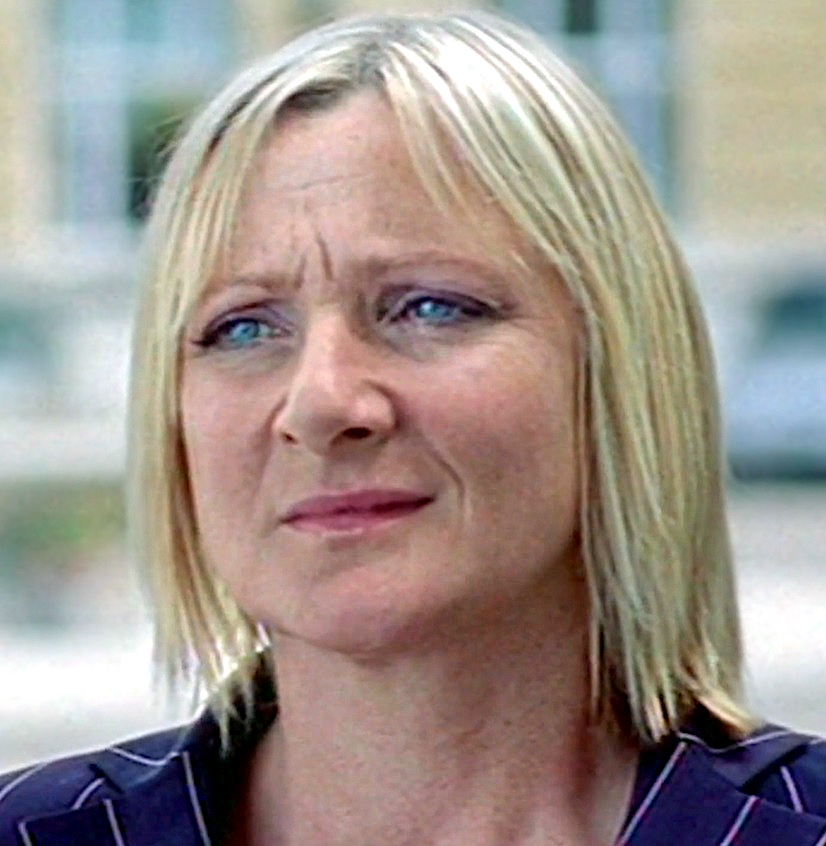
Lesley Sharp as pictured in 2003 (top) and Paul Kasey as pictured behind the scenes of "The Well" wearing the mask used for the Entity's brief appearance (bottom)

Davies had the idea of the Entity in his head for quite a while prior to its usage in "Midnight". The idea for the entity's usage of mimicry hailed from a conversation between showrunner Russell T Davies and producer Phil Collinson, in which the two accidentally kept repeating each other's words. Davies realized it could be used in a mocking manner, inspiring the usage in the final episode. The concept of communication as a major theme with the Entity was also inspired by the Star Trek: The Next Generation episode "Darmok", with Davies being inspired by the concept of communicating with a creature who spoke an incomprehensible language to such an extent that he avoided watching the episode to allow himself to develop the idea independently of it. In the final episode, Lesley Sharp portrays Sky Silvestry, including when Sky is possessed by the Entity. Scenes where Sharp had to speak in unison with David Tennant's Tenth Doctor while mimicking him were done via extensive practice between the two actors, and Sharp's scenes were done in such a way that she only needed to learn particular scenes, with a lot of work additionally done in post-production, making the task of Sharp mimicking the others characters' dialogue substantially easier.

"The Well" was originally intended to feature the Orishas, a Nigerian spirit, as the primary antagonists instead of the Midnight Entity, but it was later converted into a sequel to "Midnight" after the writers couldn't find a way to write the Orishas from a proper point of view. Davies felt like the actions in the script greatly fit the behaviors of the Entity that featured in the story, thus deciding to bring the creature back for the episode. In a brief on-screen appearance, Paul Kasey portrayed the Midnight Entity.

The Midnight Entity's name is a colloquial name given to the Entity; its true name is never stated in the show itself. The Entity has also been referred to as "It Has No Name" in the end credits of "The Well" and other official names given to the creature include the Diamond's Shadow and the Haunting of Sky Silvestry.

== Reception and analysis ==
The Midnight Entity's appearance in "Midnight" was met with a highly positive response. Several publications have regarded it as being among the most frightening antagonists in the show, in particular due to its lack of a visible appearance, as well for its role within "Midnight", which has been referred to as one of the most well-regarded episodes in the show's history. The New York Times's Isobel Lewis stated that the Entity's lack of a physical appearance, as well as its unsolved mystery following the end of the story, helped to make it a memorable antagonist among fans of the series, who in the years after the episode would frequently speculate on the true identity of the Entity. Louise Griffin, writing for Radio Times similarly stated that the ambiguity surrounding the Entity was a core part of its success as an antagonist, as in a show like Doctor Who where aliens and monsters are a core part of the show's identity, the lack of a physical form made the creature significantly more threatening. /Film's Michael Boyle regarded that this lack of closure on what the creature was is what made it appeal to viewers, and the initial loose thread of its existence without resolution allowed it to "haunt viewers just as it haunts the Doctor". Its ability to sow paranoia among the other human characters in the story has been regarded as another strong point of the Entity's execution. Katherine Sas in More Doctor Who and Philosophy analysed the Entity's role in the story, regarding that unlike other extraterrestrial monsters, the creature's unexplained origins and ties to folkloric elements (Such as the idea of midnight being a period of vulnerability) make it behave "like a devil out of a folk tale." Its subsequent action of taking away the Doctor's speech, a defining trait of the character used to get them out of tough situations, makes him vulnerable, ramping up the level of fear for viewers.

The Midnight Entity's return in "The Well" received mixed responses from critics. Several critics highlighted the choice to keep it unseen, allowing its core mystery to remain intact. Den of Geek's Stefan Mohammed regarded that the episode added just enough details regarding the creature to make the episode feel worthwhile to viewers without removing the mystery behind it. Newsweek's Ryan Woodrow praised its return, highlighting the story for showing the impact the Entity made on the Doctor in "Midnight" as well as for keeping its mystique intact. Vicky Jessop, writing for the London Evening Standard, opined that while the twist of the creature's return was exciting, the episode did not follow up well on the reveal. IGN's Robert Anderson felt that while the story was able to expand upon the Entity without rehashing "Midnight", the Entity felt less "unknowable", and due to the change in how the creature functioned, the return felt to Anderson as "unnecessary at best, and actively disappointing at worst."
