= Bethany Antonia =

British actress (born 1997)

- Born: 25 December 1997 (age 28); Birmingham, England
- Education: Birmingham Ormiston Academy (Musical Theatre)
- Occupation: Actress
- Years active: 2012–present

Bethany Antonia (born 25 December 1997) is a British actress and singer. She began her career as a teenager, appearing in the Shakespeare Birthplace Trust short film adaptation of The Tempest, later making her television debut in 2016 as a guest star in BBC One soap opera, Doctors.

Since 2022, Antonia has portrayed the role of Lady Baela Targaryen in the HBO fantasy series House of the Dragon, a Game of Thrones prequel and adaptation of George R. R. Martin fictional history book Fire and Blood.

She has also appeared in the BBC teen series Get Even (2020), the Netflix crime drama Stay Close (2021), and the ITV biopic Nolly (2023). In 2026, she appeared as a contestant on the twenty-fourth series of Strictly Come Dancing.

== Early and personal life ==
Bethany Antonia was born on 25 December 1997 in Quinton, Birmingham; Antonia is of mixed English and Jamaican heritage. When she was six, her family moved to a small coastal town in the southwestern Charente-Maritime region of France, before returning to Birmingham when she was eleven.

She attended Perryfields High School and then went on to study musical theatre at Birmingham Ormiston Academy.

At 14, she began training at First Act Workshop, formerly Central Junior Television Workshop, and with the British Youth Music Theatre.

Antonia is a lesbian, and came out on Instagram in response to a racist comment.

== Career ==
Antonia's first professional role was in a short film adaptation of The Tempest in 2012 made by the Shakespeare Birthplace Trust following open auditions, aged 14.

She later joined the British Youth Music Theatre. appearing on stage in London in their 2013 stage production of Burnt Out Souls.

She performed in musical productions of Hairspray and Peter Pan: A Musical Adventure.

In 2016 at the age of 18, Antonia made her television debut with a guest appearance in an episode of the BBC One medical soap opera Doctors.

In 2017 Antonia played Chelsea in British Film Institute feature film Pin Cushion starring Joanna Scanlan and Lily Newmark.

In 2019, Antonia was cast as Margot Rivers in the BBC iPlayer and Netflix teen series Get Even, an adaptation of the Don't Get Mad book series by Gretchen McNeil.

In 2021, Antonia played Kayleigh Shaw alongside Cush Jumbo in the eight-episode Netflix crime drama Stay Close, part of a collaboration between Red Production Company and Harlan Coben.

In 2022, Antonia played Rach in Lava at Soho Theatre by British playwright James Fritz.

As of 2022, Antonia portrays Lady Baela Targaryen in the HBO fantasy series House of the Dragon, a Game of Thrones prequel and adaptation of George R. R. Martin's fictional history book Fire and Blood.

In 2023, Antonia played Poppy Ngnomo in Russell T Davies's ITV miniseries Nolly, alongside Helena Bonham Carter.

As of 2023, Antonia has been a voiceover performer for Big Finish Productions an audio drama company producing audiobooks primarily based on science fiction, and heavily featuring the Doctor Who universe. Antonia has voiced characters in Dark Season: Legacy Rising, Doctor Who: The Seventh Doctor Adventures, The New Adventures of Bernice Summerfield, The War Master (audio drama series).

In 2024, Antonia played Marianne Dashwod in the Hallmark Channel TV Movie adaptation Sense and Sensibility. The same year, Antonia played Mo Gilliban in Russell T Davies's Doctor Who episode "The Well".

In 2026, Antonia was cast in the role of Eurydice in the West End production of Hadestown. In July 2026, Antonia was announced as a contestant on the twenty-fourth series of Strictly Come Dancing. The BBC was subject to criticism after defending a decision to blur out the trans rights slogan Protect the Dolls on a T-shirt that Antonia wore on the show.

== Filmography ==
=== Film ===
Year	Title	Role	Notes
2012	The Tempest		Short film
2017	Pin Cushion	Chelsea	
2021	There's Always Hope	Pen	

=== Television ===
Year	Title	Role	Notes
2017	Doctors	Jade Okonjo	Episode: "Blitz Spirit"
2018	Stath Lets Flats	Leanne	Episode: "It's a Manager Day"
2020	Get Even	Margot Rivers	Main Role: 10 episodes
2021	Stay Close	Kayleigh Shaw	Main Role: 8 episodes
2022–present	House of the Dragon	Baela Targaryen	Main role; 16 episodes
2023	Nolly	Poppy Ngomo	
2024	Sense and Sensibility	Marianne Dashwood	TV Movie
2025	Doctor Who	Mo Gilliben	Episode: "The Well"
2026	Strictly Come Dancing	Contestant	Series 24

=== Audio ===
Year	Title	Role	Production	Notes
2023	Dark Season: Legacy Rising	Nina Lewis	Big Finish Productions	Main role
2023	Doctor Who: The Seventh Doctor Adventures	Captain Rocky	Big Finish Productions	Episode: "Naomi's Ark"
2025	Call Me Master	Elta the Acolyte	Big Finish Productions	Episode: "The Good Life"
2025	The War Master	Suki	Big Finish Productions	Episode: "Last Girl Standing"
2025	The New Adventures of Bernice Summerfield	Hamesha	Big Finish Productions	Episode: "The Winner's Tale"

== Stage ==
Year	Title	Role	Notes
2013	Peter Pan: The Never Ending Story	Lost Child	Arena Tour
2022	Lava	Rach	Soho Theatre, London
2026	Hadestown	Eurydice	Lyric Theatre, London
