= After Hours (2015 British TV series) =

2015 comedy drama

After Hours is a 2015 comedy drama broadcast in November 2015 on British broadcaster Sky 1. It is directed by Craig Cash, produced by Jellylegs and stars Jaime Winstone, Ardal O'Hanlon and John Thomson. It was written by Molly Naylor and John Osborne and is the first script they wrote for television. The theme tune was recorded by Babyshambles and is a cover of the Velvet Underground song "After Hours". The show is mostly known for its eclectic soundtrack which features bands such as the Pixies, The Smiths, Los Campesinos!, Hefner, Gorkys Zygotic Mynci, Bearsuit, Damon Albarn, Sister Rosetta Tharpe and Modest Mouse.

== Production ==
The show follows an eighteen-year-old boy Willow (James Tarpey) and how he learns to cope after being dumped by his girlfriend Jasmine (played by BAFTA winner Georgina Campbell). He meets Lauren (Winstone), who invites him to join her and her friend Ollie (Rob Kendrick) on a late night radio show they broadcast from her boat. They play songs many people have never heard before, as well as artists like The Smiths, Tom Waits and The Pixies. Their radio show provides the soundtrack to the sitcom. At first Willow's mum and dad (Susan Cookson and O'Hanlon) disapprove, but they are won over by the infectious personalities of the two radio presenters.

It is the first ever television appearances of James Tarpey, Fergus van Gelder and Laura Woodward and reunites John Thomson and Craig Cash, who worked together in the 1990s. There are cameos by Caroline Aherne, Hollie-Jay Bowes, and Jaz Martin.

The show is available to watch on Now TV in the United Kingdom and on Amazon Prime in the United States of America and Australia.
