= A Brixton Tale =

2021 British film

- Directed by: Darragh Carey; Bertrand Desrochers
- Screenplay by: Rupert Baynham; Darragh Carey; Chi Mai
- Produced by: Rupert Baynham; Darragh Carey; Beau Ramaut
- Starring: Lily Newmark; Ola Orebiyi; Craige Middleburg; Jaime Winstone; Barney Harris; Dexter Padmore
- Cinematography: Kristof Brandl
- Edited by: Derek Holland
- Music by: Peter Venne
- Production companies: BWGTBLD; Paradox House; Reprobate Films; The Damned Crew
- Distributed by: Bulldog Film Distribution; Parkland Pictures
- Release date: 12 February 2021 (Slamdance Film Festival)
- Running time: 76 minutes
- Country: United Kingdom
- Language: English

A Brixton Tale is a romantic drama film directed by Darragh Carey and Bertrand Desrochers, which premiered at Slamdance Film Festival in 2021. The first theatrical release was in September 2021 in the UK.

== Plot ==
Benji lives in Brixton and he spends his days keeping his best friend Archie out of trouble. Benji falls in love with Leah, a young YouTuber from a wealthy family who is obsessed with street culture. When Leah is tasked with creating a film project, she chooses Benji as her protagonist. But, as she searches for edgy footage, the line between art and exploitation starts to blur.

== Cast ==
- Lily Newmark as Leah
- Ola Orebiyi as Benji
- Craige Middleburg as Archie
- Jaime Winstone as Tilda
- Barney Harris as Charles
- Dexter Padmore as Darius
- Michael Maloney as Simon
- Lee Nicholas Harris as Stuart
- Ania Nova as Benji's friend
- Karen Ascoe as Suzanne
- Sophie Ablett as Florence
- Jonty Weston as Albert
- Adonis Nugent as Taz
- Demetrius Miller as Dotty
- Ian Michaels as Sam Choux
- Rose Kerr as Inez
- Remael Walker as Remz
- Jerome Miller as Mills

== Production ==
=== Cast and crew ===
This film is Darragh Carey and Bertrand Desrochers' first feature film, based on a script by Rupert Baynham.

Ola Orebiyi, who plays Benji in the film, previously starred in Limbo and Cherry. Lily Newmark plays Leah, Jaime Winstone plays the role of Tilda, Michael Maloney plays the role of Simon. Craige Middleburg plays Benji's best friend Archie.

=== Filming and colour palette ===
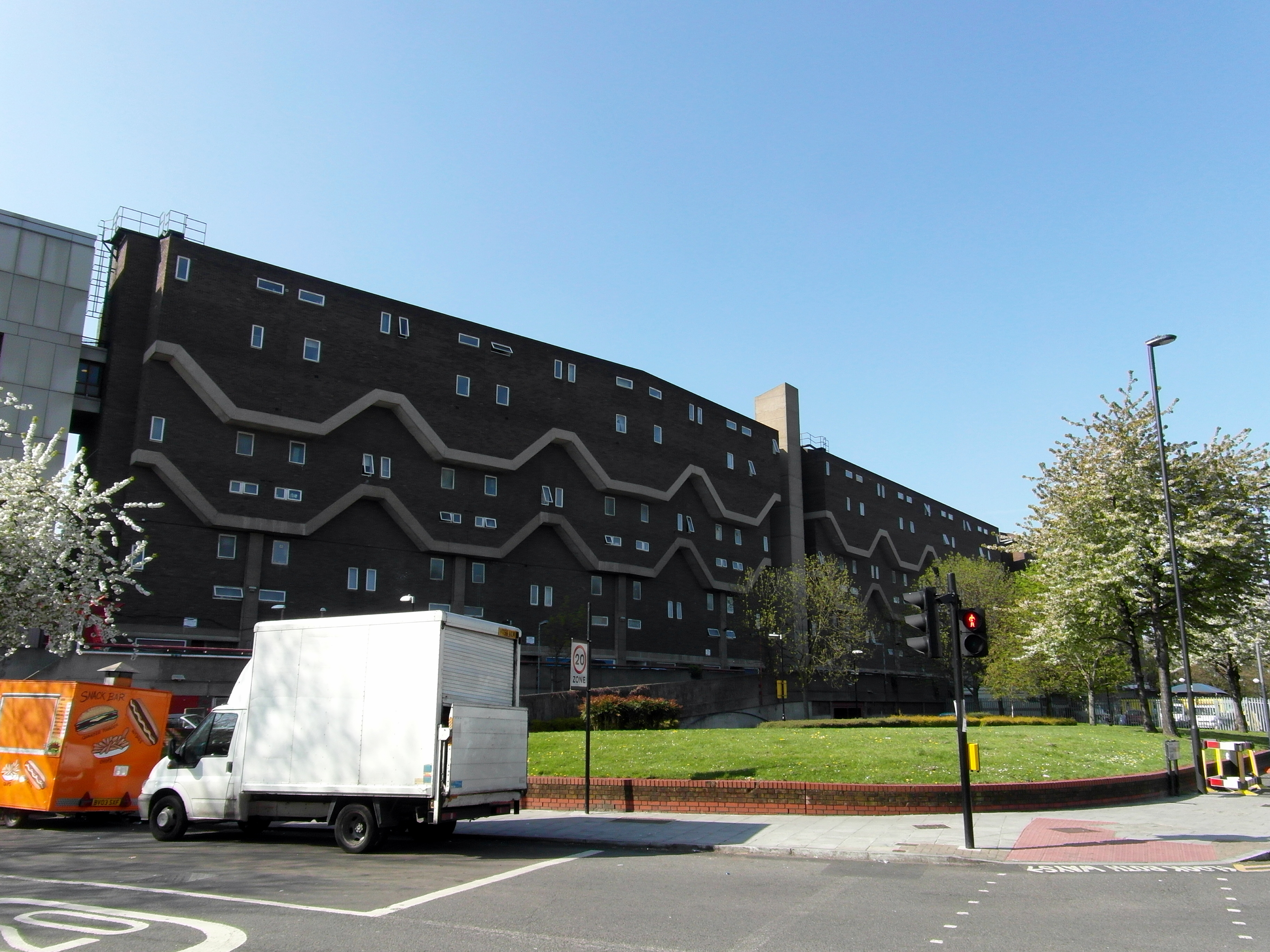
One of the locations: the area around the Southwyck House (also known as the "Barrier Block") in Brixton

Filming took place around the Barrier Block and Moorlands Estate in Brixton, London. Carey and Desrochers worked out a specific colour palette with cinematographer Kristof Brandl, to highlight the contrast between Leah and Benji's world.

=== Release ===
The film premiered at the Slamdance Film Festival on February 12, 2021. It was then released in the United Kingdom cinemas on September 17, 2021.

== Critical reception ==
On review aggregator website Rotten Tomatoes, the film holds an approval rating of 89% based on 19 reviews, with an average rating of 6.4/10.

In her review for The Guardian Cath Clarke praised the direction and performances but felt that the social commentary was overpowering. Clarke concluded: "Its a film with some strong moments and impressive performances, especially from Orebiyi. But in the end it feels like social commentary overtakes the drama." Leslie Byron Pitt, a critic from the magazine Little White Lies writes in her review that the social gap between Benji and Leah is portrayed in a brutally honest way. With Leah you can never be sure that she is aware of her status or her privileges. On the other hand, the film makes it very clear from the start that Benji is not the stereotypical “product of his surroundings” that Leah really wants to portray. Alex Davidson for Sight & Sound praised the lead performances, particularly from Orebiyi, and the anti-privilege theme but criticised some simplicity in the story. He considered "A Brixton Tale has a simplicity that sometimes verges on the simplistic but the strong lead performances, some effective set pieces and its unassailable arguments against privilege make this a tale worth telling." Wendy Ide for Screen Daily praised Orebiyi's performance while also criticising the use of Lea as a narrative device in some aspects of the story. Ide stated " ... there is a skittish unpredictable energy to the storytelling and a well realised sense of place ...

=== Festivals ===
Oldenburg International Film Festival 2021

- Nominated for Best Film for the Audience Award / German Independence Award (Darragh Carey and Bertrand Desrochers)

SCHLINGEL International Film Festival 2021

- Audience award [Winner]

Slamdance Film Festival 2021

- Grand Jury Prize [Nominee] Best Narrative Feature
