= Molly Naylor =

English poet

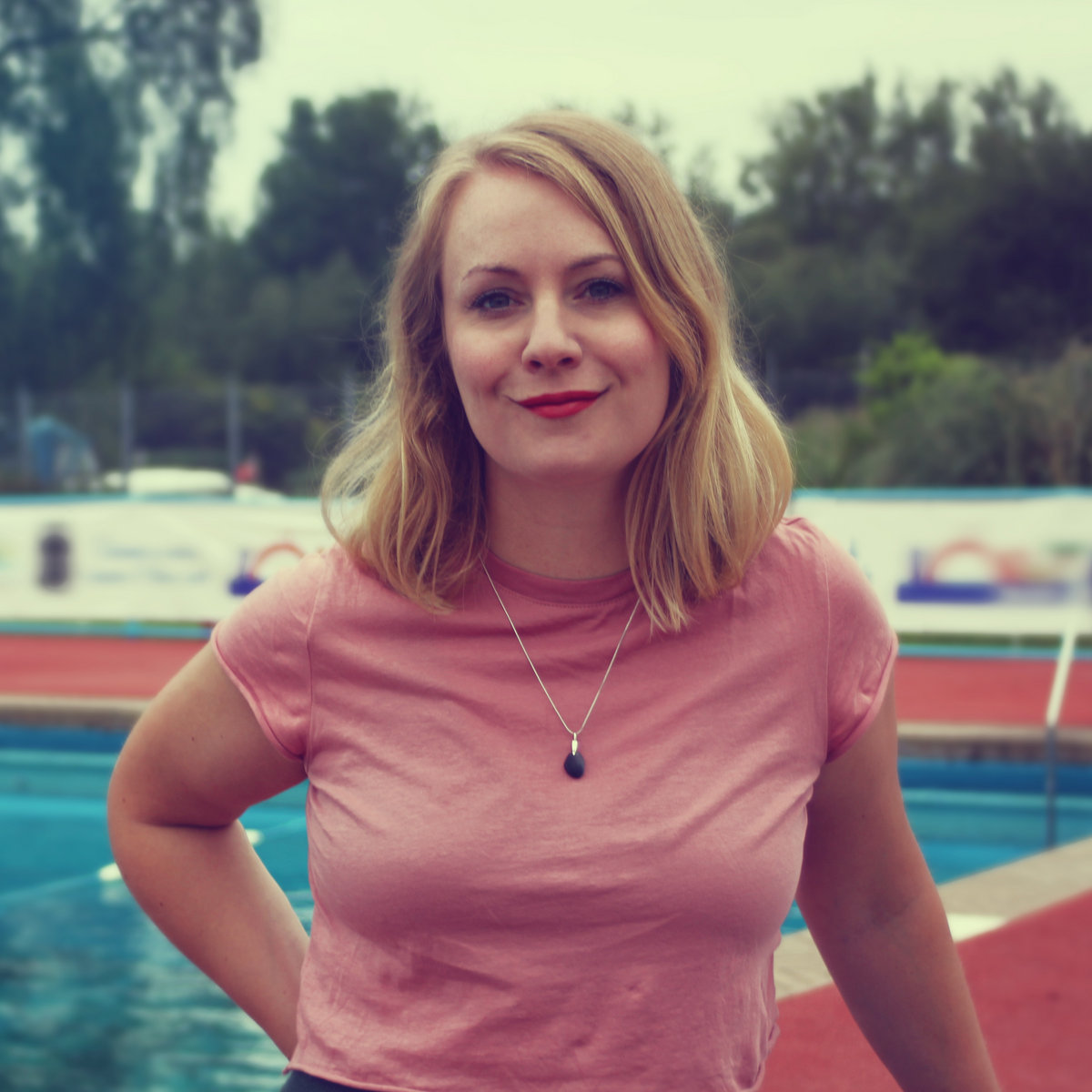
- Occupations: Scriptwriter, poet, performer and director
- Website: www.mollynaylor.com

Molly Naylor is a scriptwriter, poet, performer, podcaster and director from Cornwall, UK. She studied at the University of East Anglia, graduating in 2009, and remained living in Norwich for several years 'because it's so delightful' before moving to Sheffield. She is the co-creator of Sky One comedy After Hours.

== Career ==
=== After Hours ===
Together with John Osborne, Molly Naylor created the Sky 1 sitcom After Hours. The theme song was by recorded by Pete Doherty and is a cover of the Velvet Underground song "After Hours".

The show is about two twenty somethings who have their own radio show on a canal boat in Lincolnshire. It stars Jaime Winstone, Ardal O'Hanlon, Georgina Campbell and John Thomson. After Hours is produced and directed by Craig Cash. The show's first series was first broadcast in autumn 2015.

=== Plays and poetry ===
Molly Naylor's plays include Stop Trying to be Fantastic, Lights! Planets! People!, My Robot Heart and Whenever I Get Blown Up I Think of You (BBC Radio 4). She has performed her poetry and storytelling shows at festivals and events all over the world.

Her first poetry collection, Badminton, was published by Burning Eye Books in 2016. The same publishing house was behind her second collection, Stop Trying to be Fantastic which was published in 2020 and became the basis for her 2022 Edinburgh Fringe performance of the same name. Her third collection, Whatever You’ve Got, was published by Bad Betty Press in 2022.

The play Lights! Planets! People! was shortlisted for the New Writing South 'Best New Play Award' 2019, and following success in this format, Naylor released a comic book of the same name in 2021, in collaboration with Lizzy Stewart and Avery Hill Publishing.
