= The Well (Doctor Who) =

315 – "The Well"
- Doctor Who episode
- Promotional title-card

Cast
- Doctor: Ncuti Gatwa – Fifteenth Doctor
- Companion: Varada Sethu – Belinda Chandra
- Others: Annabel Brook – Hanno Yeft; Luke Rhodri – Callo Rence; Bethany Antonia – Mo Gilliben; Gaz Choudhry – Kai Sabba; Christopher Chung – Cassio Palin-Paleen; Caoilfhionn Dunne – Shaya Costallion; Gary Pillai – Albie Bethick; Rose Ayling-Ellis – Aliss Fenly; Frankie Lipman – Sal Van Hyten; Paul Kasey – It Has No Name; Jermaine Dominique – Ulric Dazen; Anita Dobson – Mrs Flood; Amy Tyger – Val Vivo

Production
- Directed by: Amanda Brotchie
- Written by: Russell T Davies & Sharma Angel-Walfall
- Produced by: Chris May
- Executive producers: Russell T Davies; Julie Gardner; Jane Tranter; Joel Collins; Phil Collinson
- Music by: Murray Gold
- Series: Series 15
- Running time: 48 minutes
- First broadcast: 26 April 2025

Chronology
← Preceded by "Lux"	Followed by → "Lucky Day"

"The Well" is the third episode of the fifteenth series of the British science-fiction television series Doctor Who. In the episode, the Fifteenth Doctor (Ncuti Gatwa) and his companion, Belinda Chandra (Varada Sethu), arrive at a mining colony where contact has been completely lost. Upon investigation, they discover a sole survivor: the crew's deaf cook, Aliss Fenly. Attached to her is an alien being known as the Midnight Entity that kills anyone who steps behind her. Aliss is portrayed by Rose Ayling-Ellis, a deaf actress. The cast were trained in British Sign Language, with a consultant on set to ensure that the sign language was accurate and authentic.

The episode was co-written by Russell T Davies, the Doctor Who showrunner, and Sharma Angel-Walfall, and directed by Amanda Brotchie. It was released on BBC iPlayer, BBC One, and Disney+ on 26 April 2025. The programme was originally planned as a stand-alone focussing on Nigerian spirits known as Orishas, but for several reasons it was converted into a sequel to the 2008 episode "Midnight". Filming occurred at Pant-y-Ffynnon Quarry in Bridgend in February 2024.

"The Well" was watched by 3.24 million viewers. It received largely positive responses from critics, who highlighted the cast performances in particular. Reception to the return of the Midnight Entity was mixed, however; with some reviewers feeling that it was an effective usage of the Entity and others, that it was unnecessary and detracted from the Entity's overall mystery. A novelisation of the episode written by Gareth L. Powell was released on 10 July 2025.

== Plot ==
Still unable to return to Earth on 24 May 2025, the Doctor and Belinda find themselves 500,000 years in the future among a group of troopers, led by Shaya, who are visiting a planet to investigate a loss of contact with its mining colony. They discover that everyone has been murdered except for Aliss, a deaf cook, who claims the miners went mad and killed each other. Another discovery is that every mirror on the base is broken.

Belinda learns that Aliss and the troopers have no knowledge of Earth or humanity, and the Doctor realises that he had visited the planet, then known as Midnight, 400,000 years earlier. (Note: As depicted in the episode "Midnight" (2008)) One of the troopers moves behind Aliss to check if something is there, resulting in the trooper's death. Aliss reveals there is an Entity behind her: the same Entity previously encountered by the Doctor. Belinda theorises that the Entity is concealed behind Aliss and that anyone who moves behind it is killed. Aliss says the Entity will transfer to anyone who kills her. Trooper Cassio, frustrated by Shaya's lack of action in dispelling the Entity, relieves her of command. His attempts to reveal the Entity result in many troopers' deaths, and Shaya gets Cassio killed by having Aliss turn her back on him.

The Doctor attempts to communicate with the Entity and the two appear to acknowledge each other. Remembering the broken mirrors, he theorises that the Entity is afraid of its own reflection and so he has Shaya shoot the pipes containing the base's mined mercury, creating a liquid mirror and freeing Aliss.

The group then attempts to escape the colony. Aliss and two troopers leave first, but before the others can follow, the Entity latches onto Belinda. To free her, Shaya shoots Belinda in such a way that she can later be revived. The Entity seemingly transfers to Shaya, who sacrifices herself to allow the others to escape.

Belinda and the Doctor depart in the TARDIS. On a spaceship orbiting the planet, one of the soldiers, Mo, reports the events of the expedition to Mrs Flood, an enigmatic recurring character in the series. The episode ends with a trooper seeming to notice something behind Mo, suggesting that the Entity was able to escape the planet.

== Production ==
=== Development ===
"The Well" was written by Russell T Davies, the Doctor Who showrunner, and Sharma Angel-Walfall, one of the four guest writers of the series. Prior to being hired, Angel-Walfall had been working with Jane Tranter on another Bad Wolf production, and it was Tranter who suggested Angel-Walfall to Davies. Working with Davies in the television industry had been a dream of Angell-Walfall's ever since she saw him speak when she was a child. Ahead of his initial interview with her, Davies read a "supernatural-horror-type drama" script she had written, and decided to use it as a basis for the tone of the story. As they worked on the episode, they engaged in a lot of "back-and-forth" about it, working closely with each other to develop it.

When teasing the series, Davies said that one of the previous episodes contained an "unexpected sequel". Many theories arose that "The Well" would be that episode, with assumptions made that it could be a follow-up to a number of episodes, including "The Impossible Planet" / "The Satan Pit" (2006), "Midnight" (2008), "The Waters of Mars" (2009), and "Wild Blue Yonder" (2023). It ultimately ended up being a successor to "Midnight", with the story taking place on the same planet 400,000 years later.

The script was originally intended to feature Nigerian spirits known as the Orishas as the primary antagonists, which series star Ncuti Gatwa had publicly named as a "dream storyline" of his shortly after being cast. After the writers felt they could not depict the Orishas with an appropriate level of respect, however, the episode was converted into a direct sequel to "Midnight", largely because Davies felt that the actions in the original script aligned with the behaviour of the Midnight Entity in its original appearance. Originally, Davies had considered titling the episode "The Thirteen" because thirteen people come to planet Midnight.

=== Casting ===
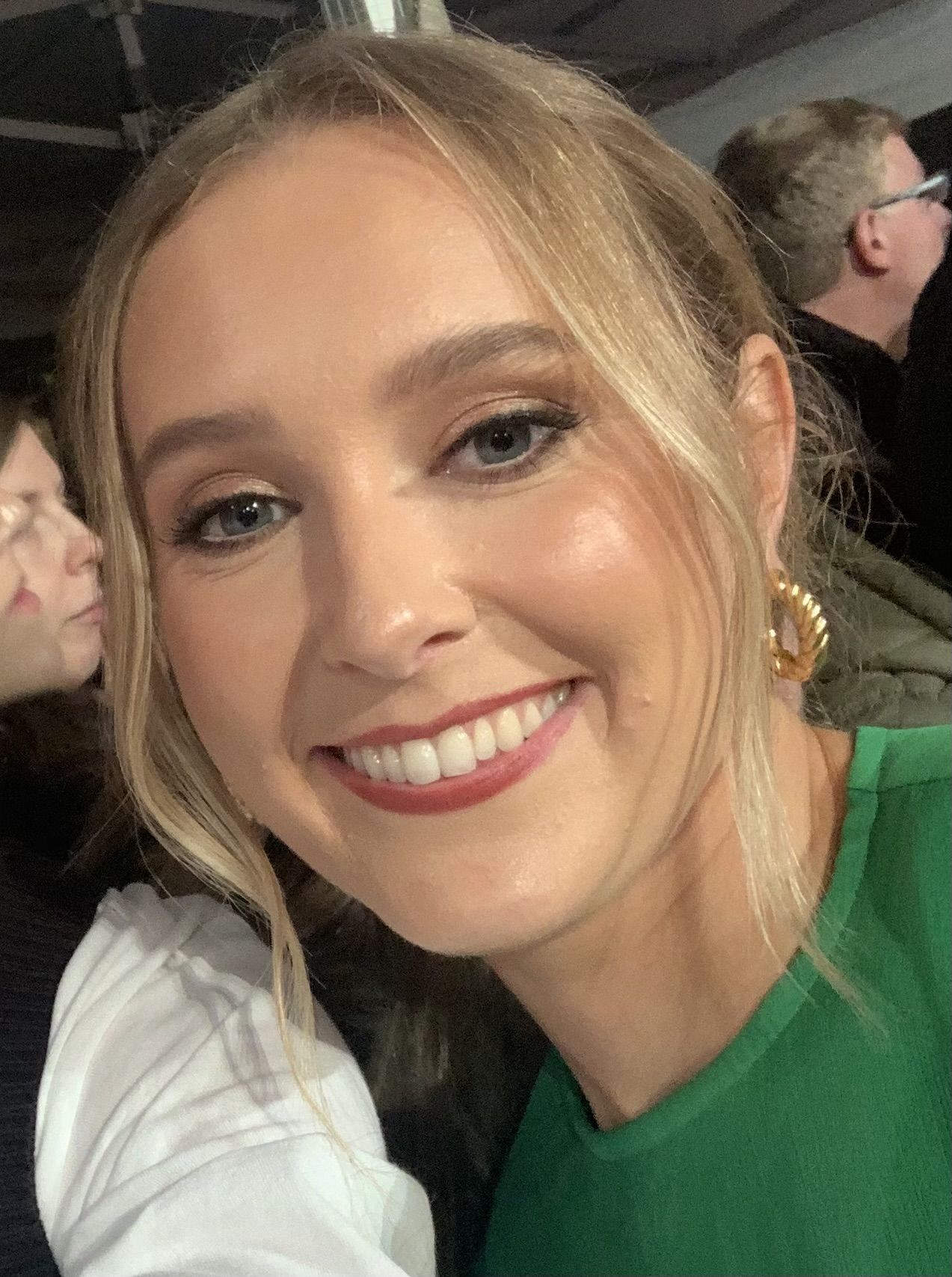
Rose Ayling-Ellis portrayed Aliss Fenly.

The episode stars Ncuti Gatwa as the fifteenth incarnation of The Doctor and Varada Sethu as his companion, Belinda Chandra. Guest character Aliss Fenly is portrayed by deaf actress Rose Ayling-Ellis, who communicates using British Sign Language (BSL). She was excited to appear in the series, saying it was on her bucket list. Executive producer Phil Collinson revealed that because the role was not originally written with a deaf actress in mind, Davies had to change part of the script when casting director Andy Pryor suggested Ayling-Ellis. When the deaf character was added and changes in the script were made accordingly, it was submitted for a compliance reading by a consultant specializing in deafness. The reading returned with a "glowing report", particularly in regard to a line describing how hearing people experience paranoia around those using sign language. Ayling-Ellis and Gatwa used BSL to communicate with each other.

Christopher Chung also guest stars in the episode as Cassio. Chung previously auditioned for two other Doctor Who episodes prior to being cast in the programme, including "Knock Knock" (2017). Paul Kasey portrayed the Midnight Entity (credited as "It Has No Name"), which was never seen in "Midnight". Kasey filmed the scenes with Ayling-Ellis right behind her in order to convey the feeling of the creature that Aliss would feel in the episode. Anita Dobson makes a further appearance as Mrs Flood, an enigmatic recurring character featured as part of the series' ongoing story arc. The remainder of the guest cast included Caoilfhionn Dunne and Bethany Antonia as Shaya Costallion and Mo Gilliben, respectively.

=== Filming and music ===
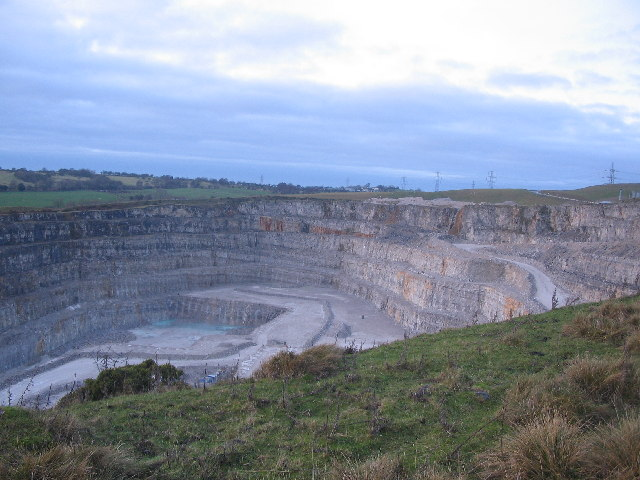
Location filming took place at Pant-y-Ffynnon Quarry.

Before production commenced, the actors portraying troopers attended a boot camp on 29 January 2024, taught by a former member of the military. A deaf-awareness course was also held for the cast and crew, and a consultant was on set to ensure authenticity while the characters were signing. The episode was filmed in the series' third production block, along with the preceding episode, "Lux". It was directed by Amanda Brotchie and the main set was constructed on Stage 6 at Wolf Studios Wales. Location filming took place at Pant-y-Ffynnon Quarry in Bridgend Wales on 1 February 2024. This same area had been previously used as a filming locale in the 2022 special "The Power of the Doctor". Some of the recording sessions occurred as late as 2:00 a.m. in subzero temperatures.

Both Gatwa and Sethu agreed that "The Well" was the hardest episode of the series to film, due to the costuming. Although each costume was specially made for each actor, the space suits were challenging to put on, with Sethu recalling that her costume required three people to attach and de-attach it. She also revealed that she got migraines from wearing her costume and after a while had to have her stunt double film her remaining scenes. The space suit helmets also proved challenging for the actors by misting up and causing issues in breathing and hearing, even though timing of the filming was done to avoid the misting.

Gatwa stated that the lack of a visual for the Midnight Entity greatly aided in his performance because of the mystery surrounding it.

Stunts were used in the story's opening, which depicted the Doctor and Belinda falling from a spaceship in orbit. Wires and green screen were used for the scene. Wires were similarly used for moments when the Entity throws people into the air. A four-point winch system was utilised in place of a conventional method to allow for simpler and more accurate movements. Stunts continued to be filmed the day after the principal photography had concluded. A GoPro camera was used to capture a different point of view. Due to other projects, Angel-Walfall was unable to attend recording sessions or view the final cut prior to broadcast. Archive footage from "Midnight" was also included in the episode. Britney Spears' song "Toxic" was briefly used in the episode, having been previously featured in "The End of the World" (2005).

== Broadcast and reception ==
Professional ratings
Aggregate scores
Source	Rating
Rotten Tomatoes (Tomatometer)	92%
Review scores
Source	Rating
The A.V. Club	A−
Bleeding Cool	8/10
Evening Standard	4/5 stars
GamesRadar+	4/5 stars
IGN	5/10
Radio Times	5/5 stars
Vulture	4/5 stars

=== Broadcast ===
"The Well" was simultaneously released on BBC iPlayer at 8 a.m. British Summer Time (BST) in the United Kingdom and on Disney+ in the United States at midnight Pacific Daylight Time on 26 April 2025. The BBC One broadcast of the episode was delayed as a result of the 2024–25 FA Cup semi-finals and was transmitted at 7:20 p.m. BST. Disney also handled international distribution of the episode.

=== Ratings ===
The episode received overnight viewing figures of 1.9 million, an improvement over the previous episode. "The Well" was the fourth most-watched programme of the day. The episode received a total of 3.24 million consolidated viewers across 7 days, and a total of 3.78 million consolidated viewers across 28 days.

=== Critical reception ===
On the review aggregator website Rotten Tomatoes, 92% of 12 critics' reviews are positive. Den of Geek's Stefan Mohamed praised the episode's cast performances, though he criticised the Entity's method of attack and the cameo appearance by Mrs Flood, as he felt the plotline involving her was too similar to that of the previous season. GamesRadar+'s Will Salmon similarly praised the episode's supporting cast, particularly Ayling-Ellis and Dunne. Daniel Cooper, writing for Engadget, praised the performance of Ayling-Ellis and its representation for deaf people. Vicky Jessop of the Evening Standard highlighted the episode's first act and ending, as well as the twist reveal of the Entity's return. Robert Anderson, however, writing for IGN, criticised the episode, stating that beyond the Entity's return the episode "lacked substance"; he also criticised the performance of the supporting cast and Gatwa.

The return of the Midnight Entity received mixed responses from critics. Mohamed praised the usage of the Entity in the episode, finding it to be effectively terrifying. Isobel Lewis, authoring a review for The A.V. Club, highlighted the return of the Midnight Entity and opined that Davies "defied expectations". Kyle Anderson with The Nerdist also highlighted the Entity, believing it to be a well-utilised evolution of the creature. Jessop, however, criticised the Entity's usage, stating that although it maintained the mystique of the Entity's original appearance, its re-appearance was less impressive. Salmon commented similarly, writing that although he found the twist effective, the reveal of the Entity did not add much to the episode, especially because it functioned differently than in its debut episode. Robert Anderson highlighted the new additions to the Entity to diversify the episode from "Midnight" but criticised the usage of the Entity, finding that the Entity was less unknowable and followed more clichéd plotlines—with the result that the comeback "chips away at the power of the original."

== In print ==
The Well
- Author: Gareth L. Powell
- Cover artist: Dan Liles
- Series: Doctor Who book: Target novelisations
- Publisher: BBC Books
- Publication date: 10 July 2025
- Pages: 176
- ISBN: 9781785949562

A novelisation of the episode was written by Gareth L. Powell and released on 10 July 2025 as part of the Target Collection. The audiobook will be read by Dunne and the cover was designed by Dan Liles.
