= Pin Cushion (film) =

2017 film

- Film poster
- Directed by: Deborah Haywood
- Written by: Deborah Haywood
- Starring: Joanna Scanlan; Lily Newmark; Chanel Cresswell; Isy Suttie; John Henshaw; Bruce Jones; Nadine Coyle
- Cinematography: Nicola Daley
- Edited by: Anna Dick; Nick Emerson
- Music by: Natalie Holt
- Release dates: 31 August 2017 (Venice Film Festival); 13 July 2018
- Running time: 82 minutes
- Country: United Kingdom
- Language: English

Pin Cushion is a 2017 English-language film written and directed by Deborah Haywood, her feature film debut. Pin Cushion premiered as the opening film of International Critics' Week at the 74th Venice International Film Festival and was released in the United Kingdom on 13 July 2018.

== Plot ==
Mother Lyn and daughter Iona (also referred to as Dafty One and Dafty Two, respectively, by each other) are excited to be starting a new life in a small Midlands town. Iona even meets a nice boy named Daz, and the two begin dating. Determined to make a success of things after a tricky start at a new school, the gawky Iona becomes ‘best friends’ with Keeley, Stacie and Chelsea. Used to having Iona to herself, Lyn feels left out and tries unsuccessfully to make her own friends starting with Belinda, her sour-faced neighbour. As much as Lyn and Iona pretend to each other that things are going well, Iona struggles with schoolmates who act more like 'frenemies' than friends (with the exception of Chelsea, who is the only one who treats her decently), and Lyn is treated with varying degrees of indifference by neighbours and a supposed support group. At Iona's party, Keeley's cousin Sicko accidentally kills their bird, Budgie. Keeley and Stacie get Iona drunk and stripped, and eventually spread the pictures around school, because as Chelsea says, "they like making people unhappy". Meanwhile, Daz is hurt by Iona shunning him at the expense of the girls. Lyn is devastated by the loss of Budgie and attends a celebrity psychic event.

== Cast ==
- Lily Newmark as Iona
- Joanna Scanlan as Lyn
- Loris Scarpa as Daz
- Sacha Cordy-Nice as Keeley
- Bethany Antonia as Chelsea
- Saskia Paige-Martin as Stacie
- Sophia Tuckey as Peggy
- John Henshaw as Percy
- Lennon Bradley as Sam
- Aury Wayne as Sicko
- Charles Francis as Dwayne
- Isy Suttie as Anne
- Jacob Lee as Jordan
- Chanel Cresswell as Belinda
- Nadine Coyle as Air Hostess

== Production ==
Pin Cushion was filmed in Haywood's home town of Swadlincote, South Derbyshire, with locations including the interior of Gresley Old Hall in Church Gresley, the interior and exterior of The Pingle Academy, the exterior of the Town Hall, and in West Street to the High Street in the town centre, and a scene filmed in Burton Queen's Hospital. The house the main characters move into can be found in Hastings Road, Swadlincote.

Haywood chose to shoot part of the film at her old school because she "had such an awful time there. Before the film I used to close my eyes when I would drive past, now when I drive past I have great memories of making a film there." The graffiti written about her in the past had been painted over in the intervening years.

== Reception ==
Pin Cushion has received positive reviews from critics. On review aggregator Rotten Tomatoes, the film holds an approval rating of 89%, based on 36 reviews with an average rating of 7.1/10. The website's critical consensus reads, "Pin Cushion explores the prickly dynamics of mother-daughter relationships and female friendships, led by striking work from leads Lily Newmark and Joanna Scanlan." Metacritic gives the film a weighted average score of 74 out of 100, based on 8 critics, indicating "generally favorable reviews". The film was described by The Guardian as an "ecstasy of black comic misery and cartoon horror".
