= The Masked Singer (British TV series) series 3 =

Season of television series

The Masked Singer
- Series 3
- Starring: Mo Gilligan; Davina McCall; Rita Ora; Jonathan Ross
- Hosted by: Joel Dommett
- No. of contestants: 12
- Winner: Natalie Imbruglia as "Panda"
- Runner-up: Charlotte Church as "Mushroom"
- No. of episodes: 8

Release
- Original network: ITV
- Original release: 1 January – 12 February 2022

Series chronology
- ← Previous; Series 2 Next → Series 4

The third series of the British version of The Masked Singer premiered on ITV on 1 January 2022, following a Christmas singalong episode which aired on 25 December 2021, and concluded on 12 February 2022. The series was won by singer Natalie Imbruglia as "Panda", with singer Charlotte Church finishing second as "Mushroom", and singer Mark Feehily placing third as "Robobunny".

== Production ==
Prior to the airing of the second series' finale, panellist Jonathan Ross revealed that the programme would be returning for a third series. Filming for the series took place between 1 and 13 November 2021.

== Panellists and host ==
Series 3 panellists and host

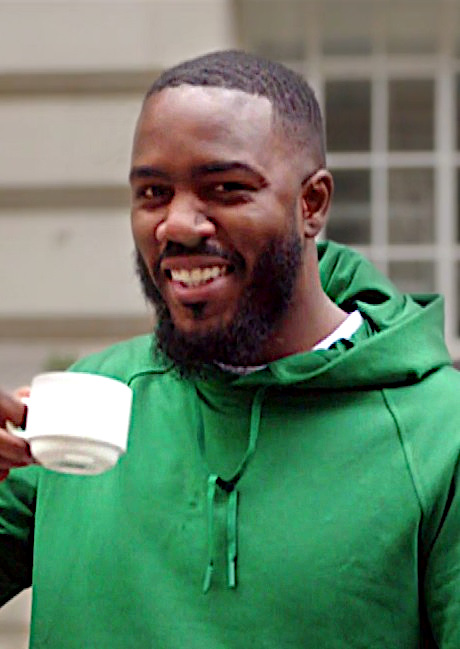
Mo Gilligan

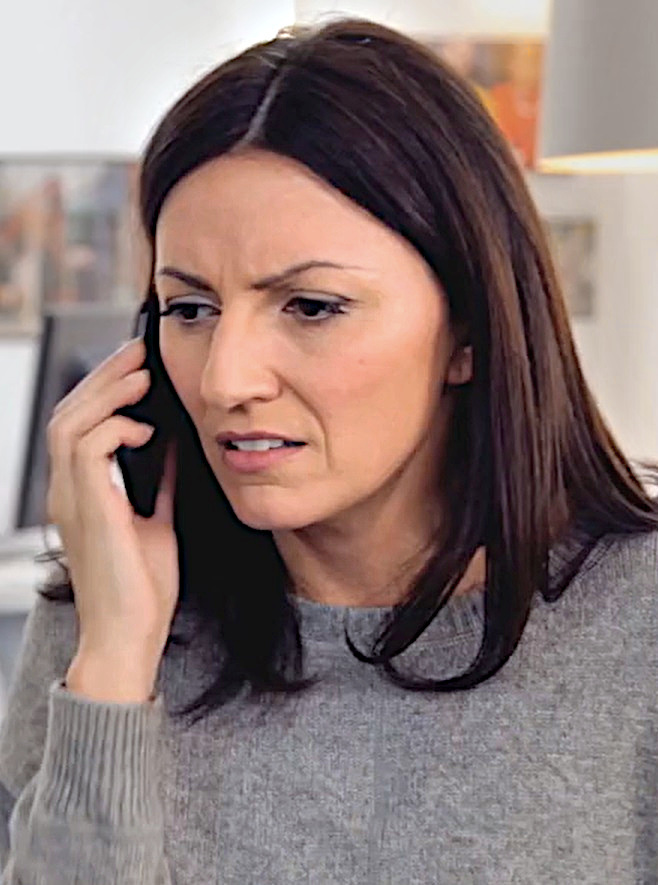
Davina McCall

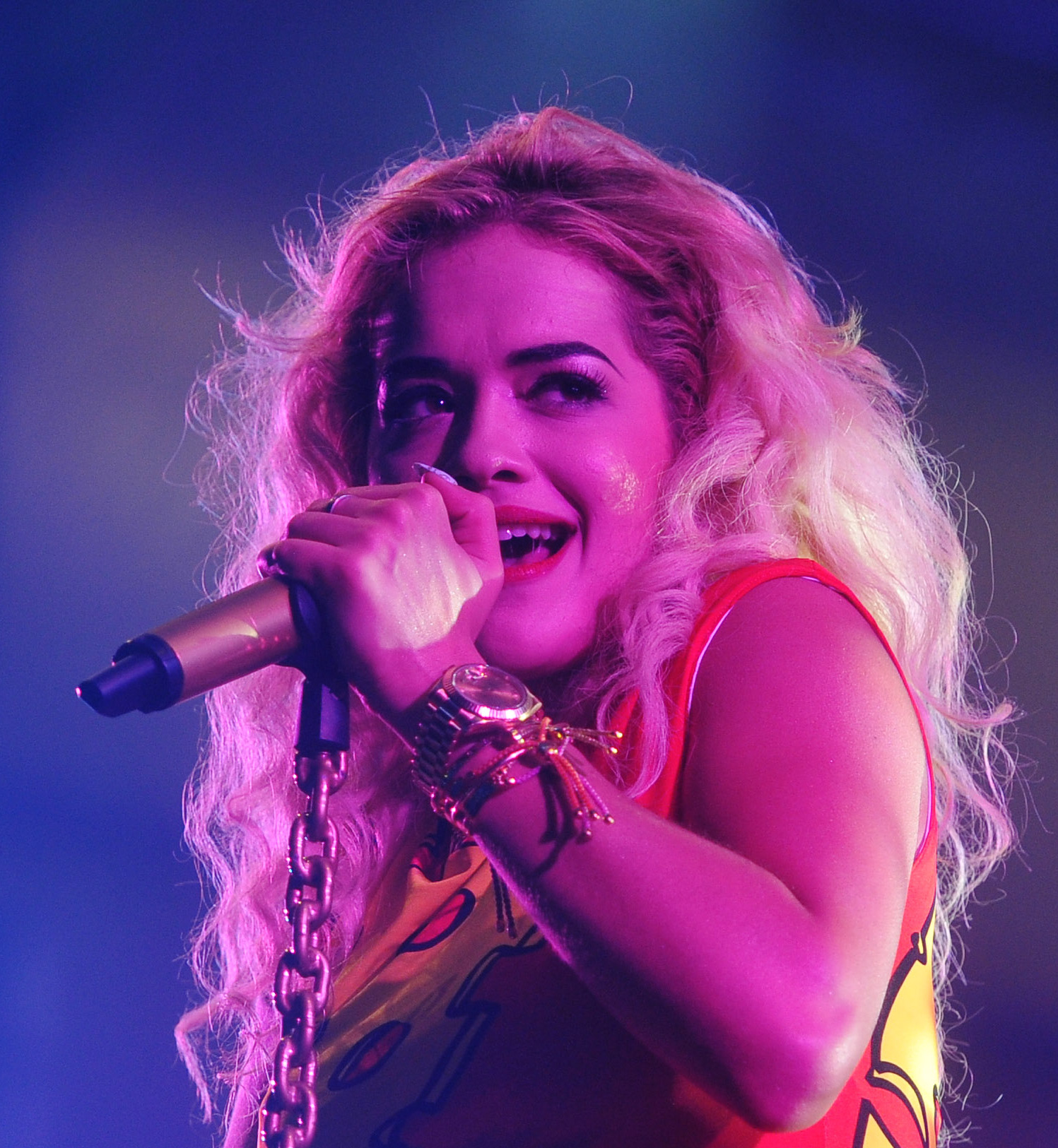
Rita Ora

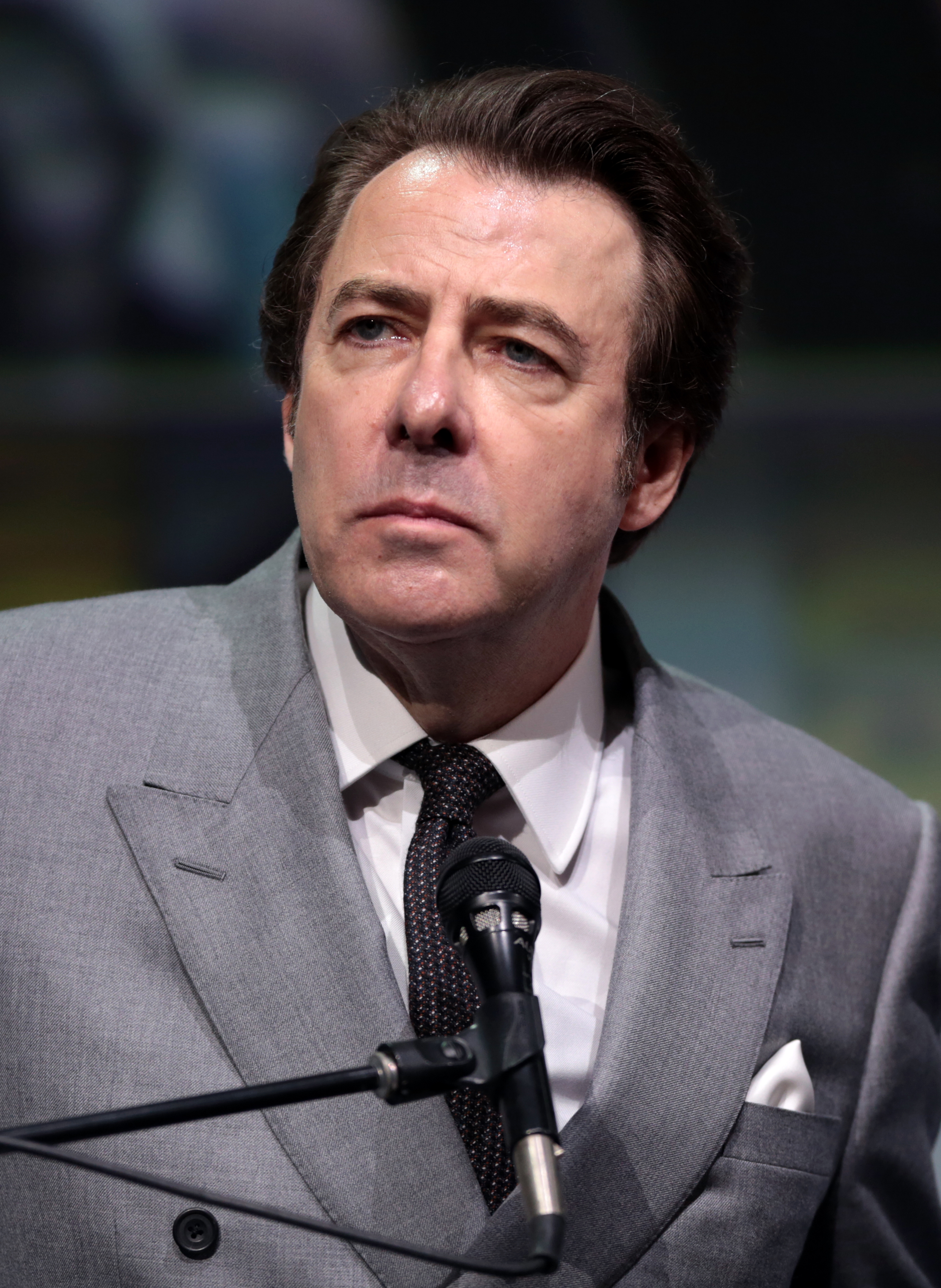
Jonathan Ross

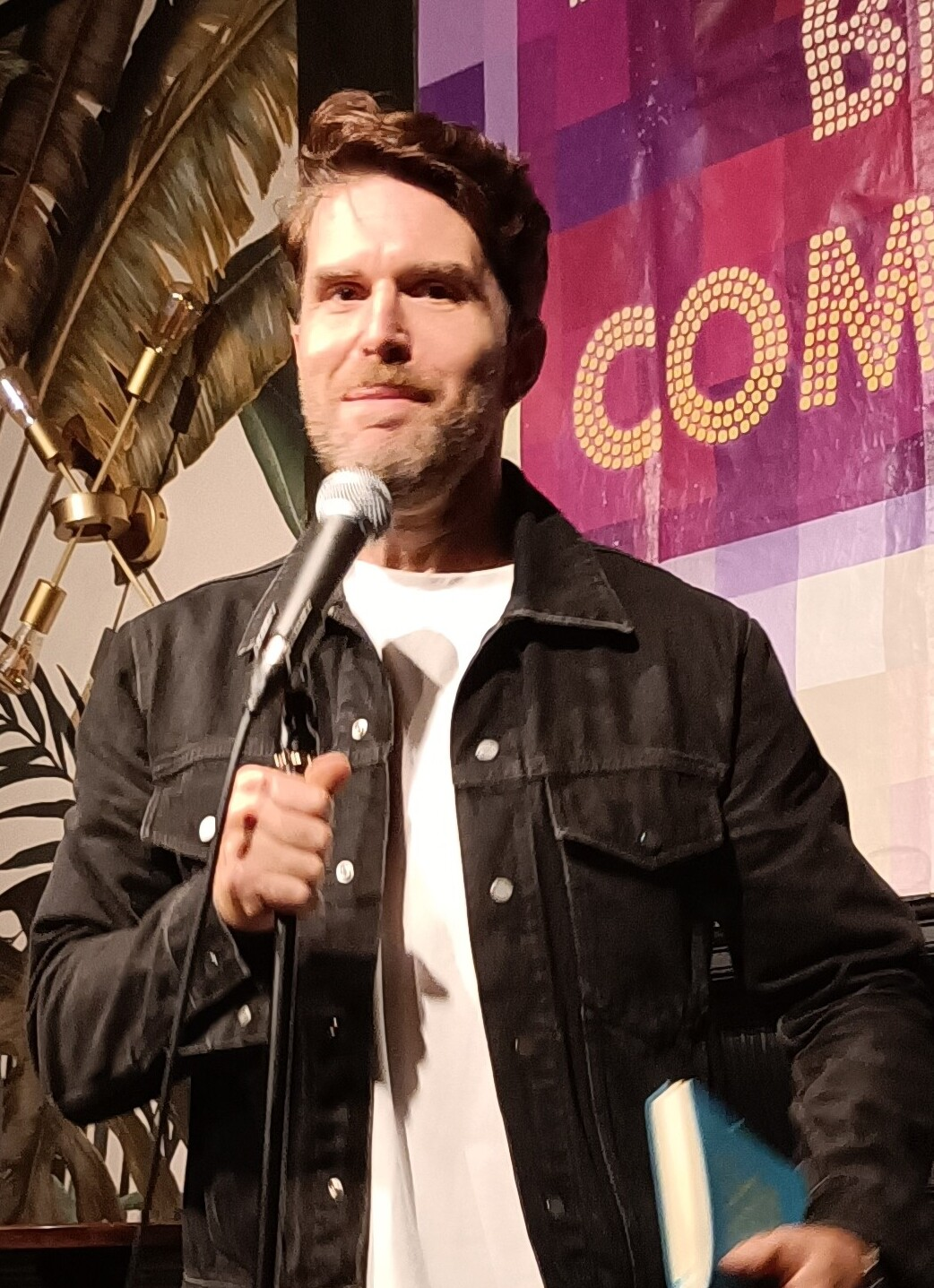
Joel Dommett

Following the announcement of the series, it was confirmed by ITV that Joel Dommett would return to present the series, whilst Jonathan Ross, Davina McCall, Rita Ora and Mo Gilligan would all return to the panel.

Guest panellists included Olly Alexander in the sixth episode, Joan Collins in the seventh episode and series two winner Joss Stone in the eighth episode.

== Contestants ==
A series of teasers revealing all twelve costumes were released on 27 November 2021.

Results
Stage name	Celebrity	Occupation	Episodes							
Stage name	Celebrity	Occupation	1	2	3	4	5	6	7	8
Panda	Natalie Imbruglia	Singer/actress		WIN		SAFE	SAFE	SAFE	SAFE	WINNER
Mushroom	Charlotte Church	Singer	RISK		SAFE		SAFE	SAFE	SAFE	RUNNER-UP
Robobunny	Mark Feehily	Singer	WIN		SAFE		RISK	SAFE	SAFE	THIRD
Rockhopper	Michelle Williams	Singer/actress		RISK		SAFE	SAFE	RISK	OUT	
Traffic Cone	Aled Jones	Singer/TV presenter		WIN		SAFE	SAFE	SAFE	OUT	
Doughnuts	Michael Owen	Footballer	WIN		SAFE		SAFE	OUT		
Firework	Jaime Winstone	Actress	RISK		RISK		SAFE	OUT		
Poodle	Tom Chaplin	Singer		WIN		RISK	OUT			
Bagpipes	Pat Cash	Tennis player		RISK		OUT				
Lionfish	Will Young	Singer	WIN		OUT					
Snow Leopard	Gloria Hunniford	TV presenter		OUT						
Chandelier	Heather Small	Singer	OUT							

The masked singer won their face-off and remained in the competition.
The masked singer was safe from elimination.
The masked singer was in the bottom three/two, but was not eliminated.
The masked singer was eliminated from the competition and unmasked upon their elimination.
The masked singer did not perform.
The masked singer won the competition.
The masked singer finished second.
The masked singer finished third.
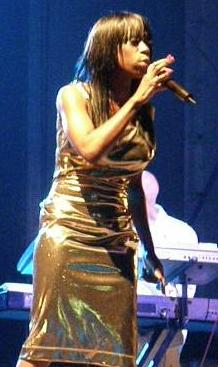
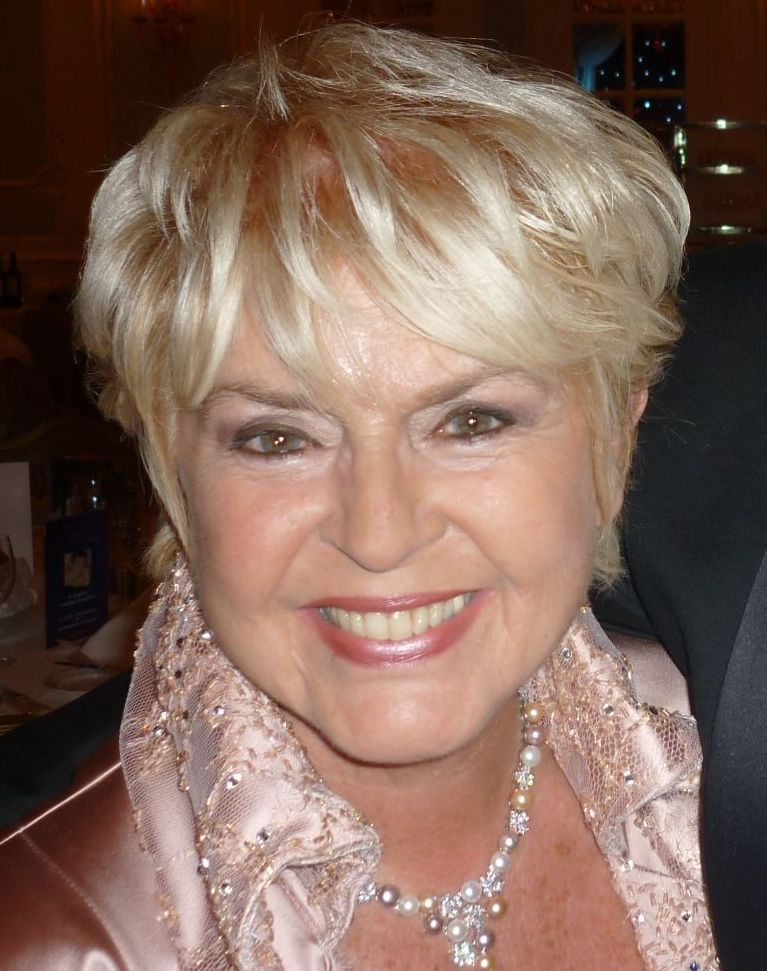
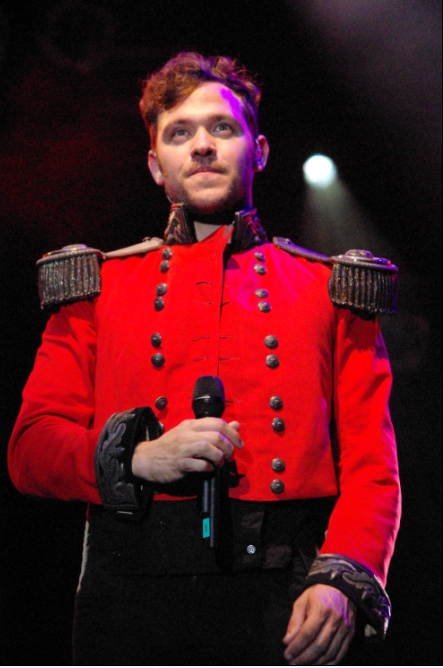
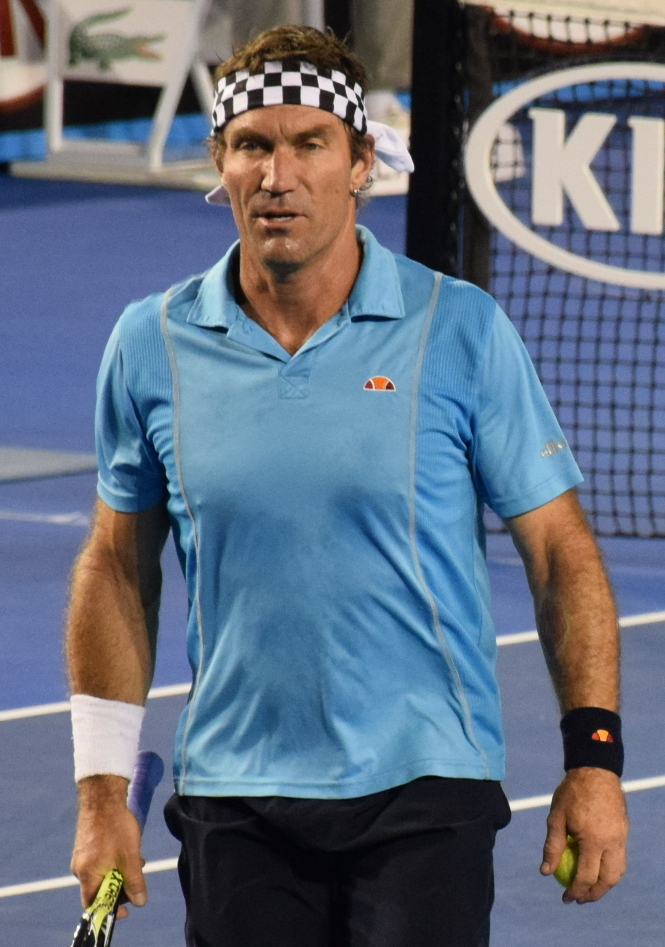
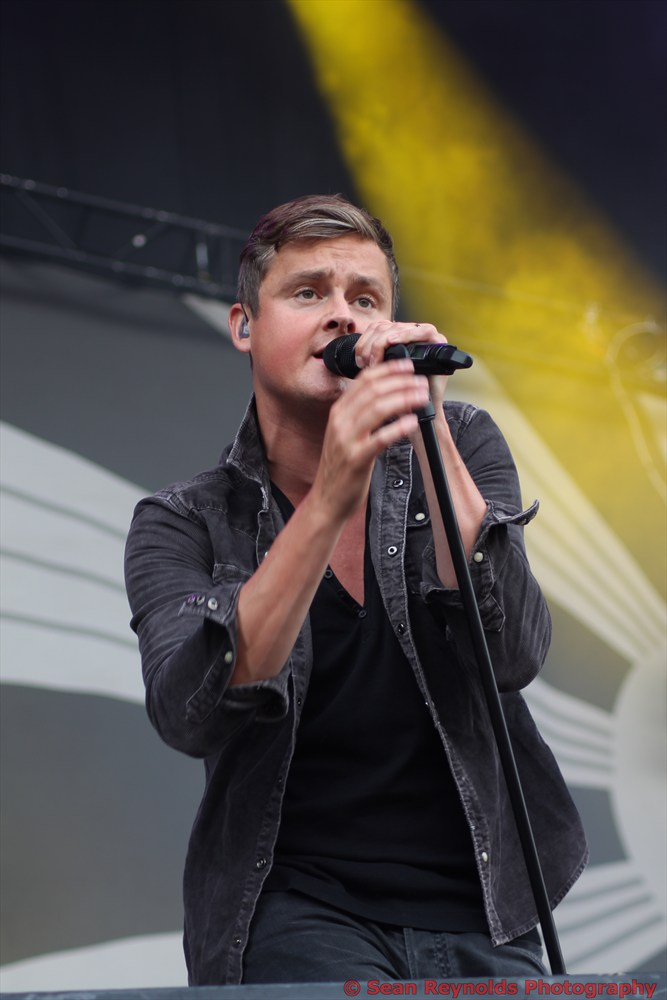
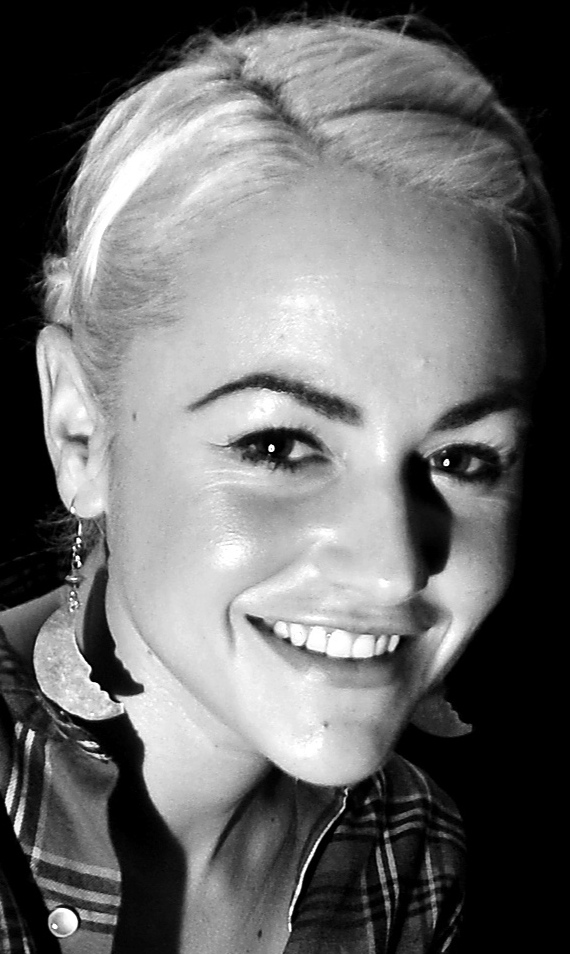
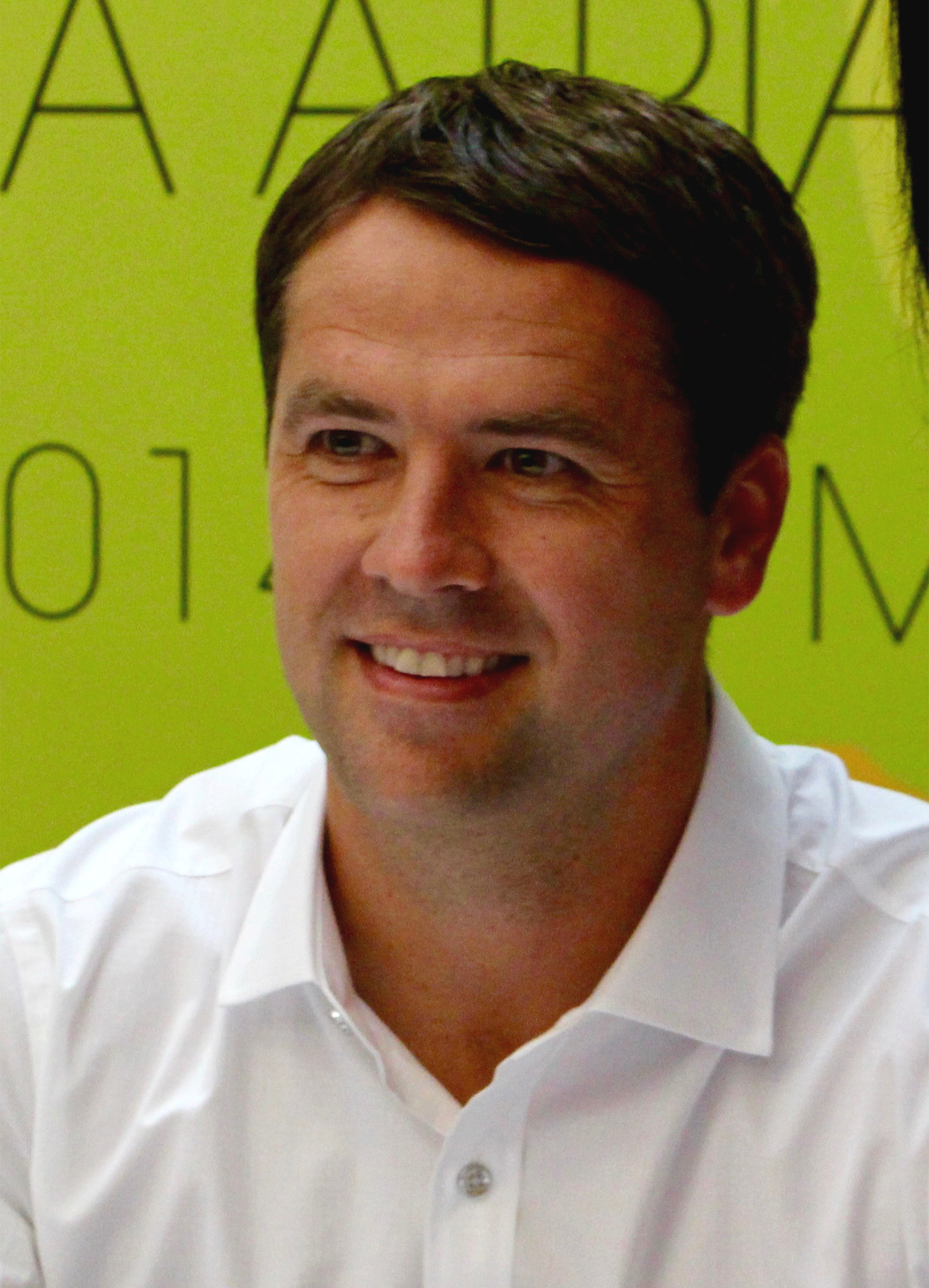
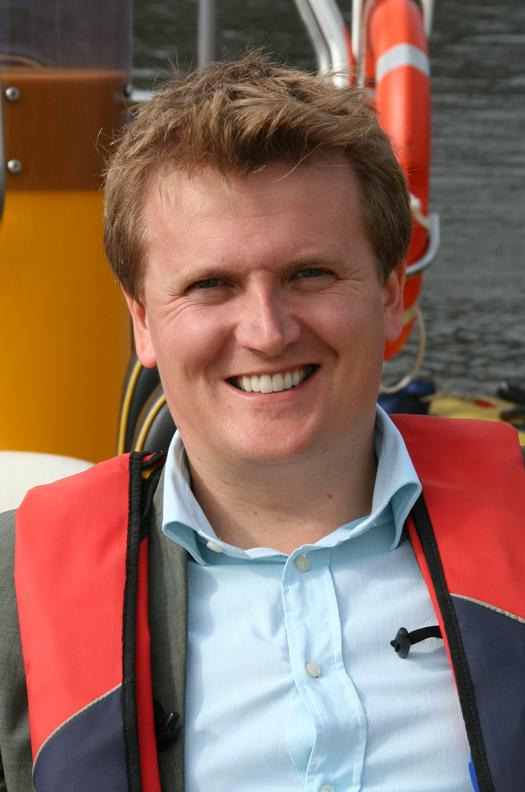
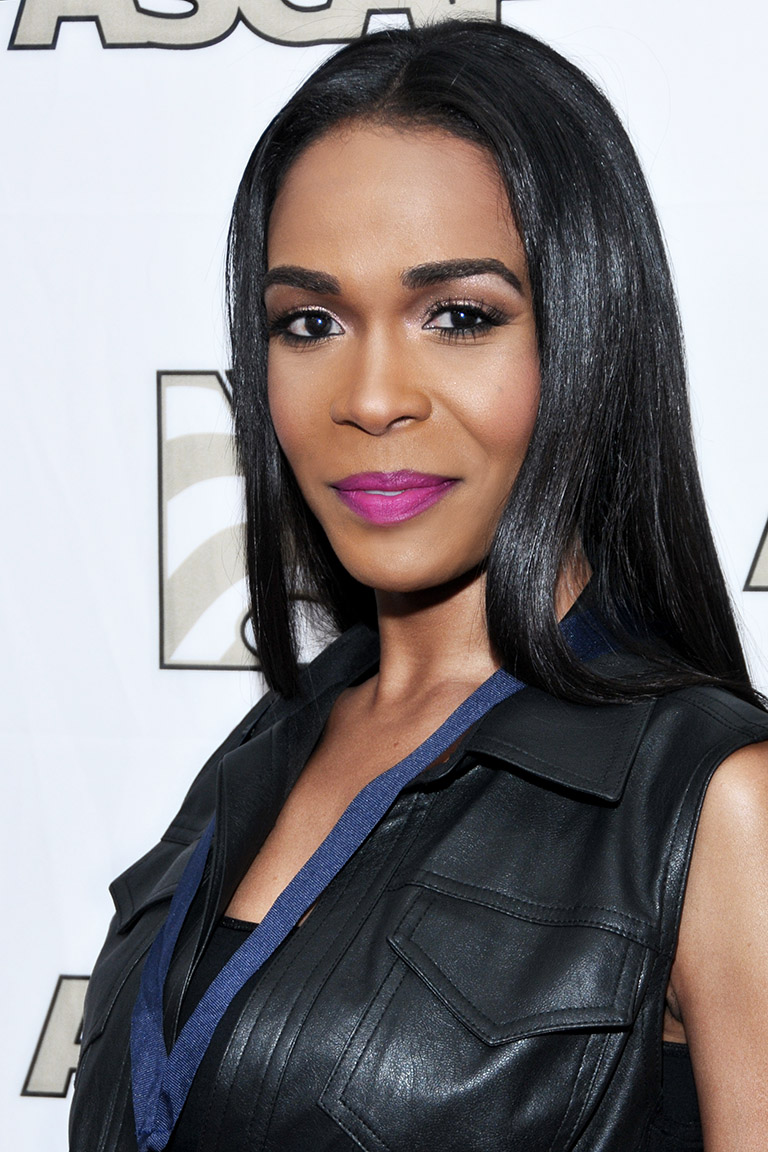
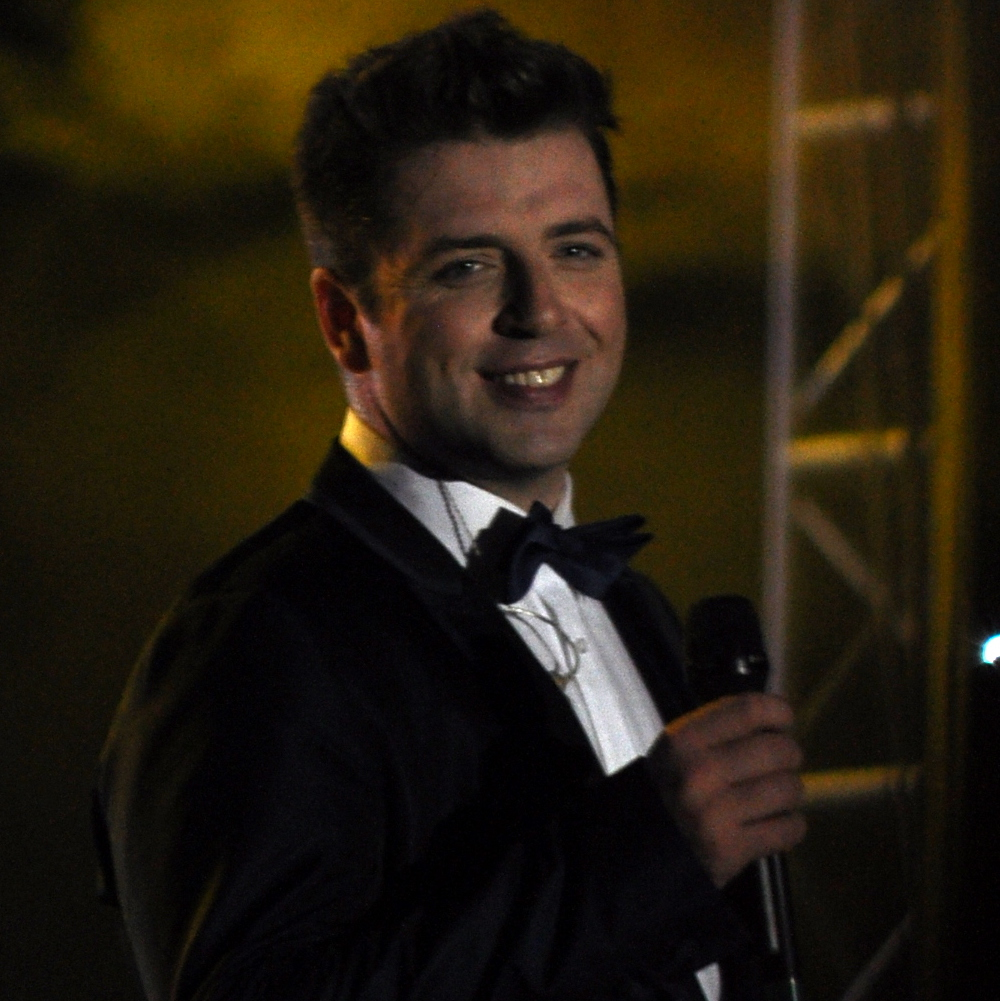
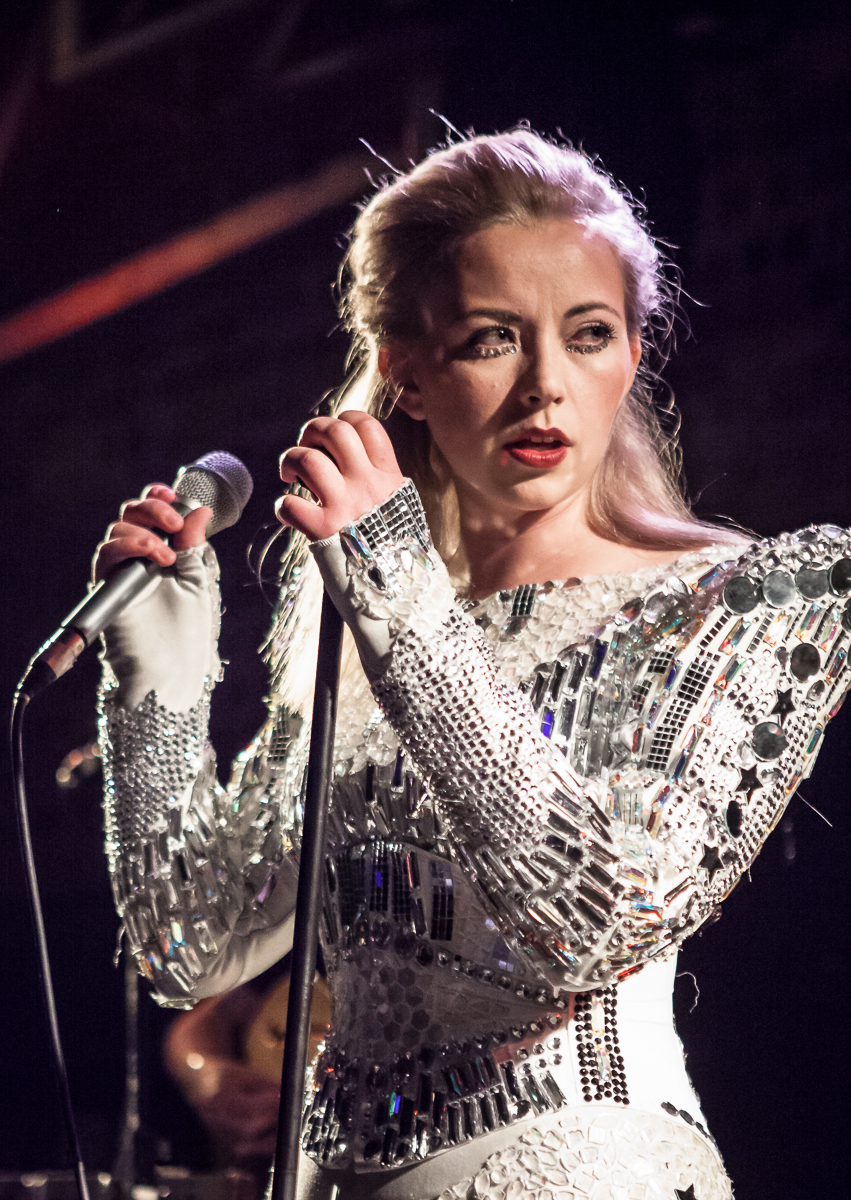
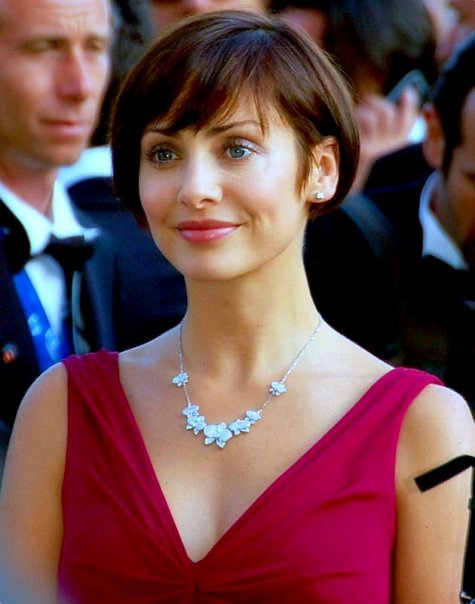
The celebrities who competed in the third series of The Masked Singer, pictured in order of elimination (L–R):
Heather Small ("Chandelier"), Gloria Hunniford ("Snow Leopard"), Will Young ("Lionfish"), Pat Cash ("Bagpipes"), Tom Chaplin ("Poodle"), Jaime Winstone ("Firework"), Michael Owen ("Doughnuts"), Aled Jones ("Traffic Cone"), Michelle Williams ("Rockhopper"), Mark Feehily ("Robobunny"), Charlotte Church ("Mushroom"), and Natalie Imbruglia ("Panda")

== Episodes ==
=== Episode 1 (1 January) ===
Performances on the first episode
#	Stage name	Song	Identity	Result
1	Mushroom	"It's Oh So Quiet" by Björk	undisclosed	RISK
2	Robobunny	"Saving All My Love for You" by Whitney Houston	undisclosed	WIN
3	Doughnuts	"Eye of the Tiger" by Survivor	undisclosed	WIN
4	Chandelier	"Crazy" by Patsy Cline	Heather Small	OUT
5	Lionfish	"Nessun Dorma" by Giacomo Puccini	undisclosed	WIN
6	Firework	"Domino" by Jessie J	undisclosed	RISK

=== Episode 2 (2 January) ===
Performances on the second episode
#	Stage name	Song	Identity	Result
1	Rockhopper	"Higher Love" by Kygo ft. Whitney Houston	undisclosed	RISK
2	Traffic Cone	"Never Gonna Give You Up" by Rick Astley	undisclosed	WIN
3	Poodle	"Rocket Man" by Elton John	undisclosed	WIN
4	Snow Leopard	"Big Spender" by Shirley Bassey	Gloria Hunniford	OUT
5	Panda	"Levitating" by Dua Lipa ft. DaBaby	undisclosed	WIN
6	Bagpipes	"Song 2" by Blur	undisclosed	RISK

=== Episode 3 (8 January) ===
- Theme: Movies
- Group number: "Another Day of Sun" from La La Land

Performances on the third episode
#	Stage name	Song	Movie	Result
1	Firework	"Fame" by Irene Cara	Fame	RISK
2	Mushroom	"There Are Worse Things I Could Do" by Stockard Channing	Grease	SAFE
3	Lionfish	"I Will Always Love You" by Whitney Houston	The Bodyguard	RISK
4	Doughnuts	"Spice Up Your Life" by Spice Girls	Spice World	SAFE
5	Robobunny	"Shallow" by Lady Gaga & Bradley Cooper	A Star Is Born	SAFE
Sing-Off			Identity	Result
1	Firework	"Sex on Fire" by Kings of Leon	undisclosed	SAFE
2	Lionfish	"Stop This Flame" by Celeste	Will Young	OUT

=== Episode 4 (15 January) ===
- Theme: Love
- Group number: "I Want It That Way" by Backstreet Boys

Performances on the fourth episode
#	Stage name	Song	Result	
1	Poodle	"What's New Pussycat?" by Tom Jones	RISK	
2	Rockhopper	"Love Is a Losing Game" by Amy Winehouse	SAFE	
3	Bagpipes	"Teenage Dirtbag" by Wheatus	RISK	
4	Traffic Cone	"When She Loved Me" by Sarah McLachlan	SAFE	
5	Panda	"Hot Stuff" by Donna Summer	SAFE	
Sing-Off			Identity	Result
1	Poodle	"Symphony" by Clean Bandit feat. Zara Larsson	undisclosed	SAFE
2	Bagpipes	"I Only Want to Be with You" by Bay City Rollers	Pat Cash	OUT

=== Episode 5 (22 January) ===
Performances on the fifth episode
#	Stage name	Clue song	Identity	Result
1	Robobunny	"Dynamite" by BTS	undisclosed	RISK
2	Doughnuts	"Sweet Caroline" by Neil Diamond	undisclosed	SAFE
3	Firework	"Kids" by Robbie Williams & Kylie Minogue	undisclosed	SAFE
4	Panda	"Story of My Life" by One Direction	undisclosed	SAFE
5	Traffic Cone	"Back for Good" by Take That	undisclosed	SAFE
6	Mushroom	"Crazy" by Gnarls Barkley	undisclosed	SAFE
7	Poodle	"Unwritten" by Natasha Bedingfield	Tom Chaplin	OUT
8	Rockhopper	"Edge of Midnight" by Miley Cyrus	undisclosed	SAFE

=== Episode 6 (29 January) ===
- Guest panelist: Olly Alexander

Performances on the sixth episode
#	Stage name	Song	Identity	Result
1	Panda	"Blame It on the Boogie" by The Jacksons	undisclosed	SAFE
2	Firework	"Waterloo" by ABBA	Jaime Winstone	OUT
3	Rockhopper	"We Don't Need Another Hero (Thunderdome)" by Tina Turner	undisclosed	RISK
4	Doughnuts	"Everybody Get Up" by Five	Michael Owen	OUT
5	Traffic Cone	"A Million Dreams" from The Greatest Showman	undisclosed	SAFE
6	Mushroom	"Stone Cold" by Demi Lovato	undisclosed	SAFE
7	Robobunny	"The Music of the Night" from The Phantom of the Opera	undisclosed	SAFE

=== Episode 7: Semi-final (5 February) ===
- Guest panelist: Joan Collins

First performances on the seventh episode
#	Stage name	Song	Identity	Result
1	Traffic Cone	"Escape (The Piña Colada Song)" by Rupert Holmes	Aled Jones	OUT
2	Rockhopper	"Adore You" by Harry Styles	undisclosed	SAFE
3	Robobunny	"Over the Rainbow" by Ariana Grande	undisclosed	SAFE
4	Panda	"Karma Chameleon" by Culture Club	undisclosed	SAFE
5	Mushroom	"Don't Walk Away" by Jade	undisclosed	SAFE

Second performances on the seventh episode
#	Stage name	Song	Identity	Result
1	Rockhopper	"Lovin' You" by Minnie Riperton	Michelle Williams	OUT
2	Robobunny	"Nothing Breaks Like a Heart" by Mark Ronson ft. Miley Cyrus	undisclosed	SAFE
3	Panda	"Dancing On My Own" by Robyn	undisclosed	SAFE
4	Mushroom	"The Power of Love" by Jennifer Rush	undisclosed	SAFE

=== Episode 8: Final (12 February) ===
- Group number: "The Edge of Glory" by Lady Gaga
- Guest panelist: Joss Stone

First performances on the eighth episode
#	Stage name	Song
1	Robobunny	"Run" by Leona Lewis
2	Panda	"Blank Space" by Taylor Swift
3	Mushroom	"Flower Duet" by Léo Delibes

Second performances on the eighth episode
#	Stage name	Song	Duet partner	Identity	Result
1	Robobunny	"I Knew You Were Waiting (For Me)" by Aretha Franklin & George Michael	Nicola Roberts (Queen Bee)	Mark Feehily	THIRD PLACE
2	Panda	"It Takes Two" by Marvin Gaye & Kim Weston	Jason Manford (Hedgehog)	undisclosed	SAFE
3	Mushroom	"We Found Love" by Rihanna feat. Calvin Harris	Aston Merrygold (Robin)	undisclosed	SAFE

Third performances on the eighth episode
#	Stage name	Song of the series	Identity	Result
1	Panda	"Story of My Life" by One Direction	Natalie Imbruglia	WINNER
2	Mushroom	"Stone Cold" by Demi Lovato	Charlotte Church	RUNNER-UP

== Ratings ==
Official ratings are taken from BARB, utilising the four-screen dashboard which includes viewers who watched the programme on laptops, smartphones, and tablets within 7 days of the original broadcast.

Episode	Date	Official 7 day rating (millions)	Official 28 day rating (millions)	Weekly rank for ITV	Weekly rank for all UK TV
1	1 January	5.21	5.71	2	8
2	2 January	4.96	5.52	7	14
3	8 January	5.95	6.52	2	5
4	15 January	6.31	6.59	2	5
5	22 January	6.09	6.34	2	5
6	29 January	6.13	6.28	2	6
7	5 February	6.62	6.75	2	5
8	12 February	7.31	7.45	2	3
Series average	2022	6.07	6.40	—N/a	
