= Lily Newmark =

English actress (born 1994)

- Born: Lily Inge Newmark; 24 May 1994 (age 32); Camberwell, London, England
- Education: East 15 Acting School
- Occupations: Actress, model
- Years active: 2012–present
- Father: Brooks Newmark
- Family: Rose Keegan (aunt); John Keegan (grandfather)

Lily Inge Newmark (born 24 May 1994) is an English actress and former model. Her films include Pin Cushion (2017) and A Brixton Tale (2021). On television, she is known for her roles in the Netflix series Sex Education (2019–2020) and Cursed (2020), the Sky One series Temple (2019–2021), and the FX series Alien: Earth (2025–).

== Early life ==
Born 24 May 1994 in Camberwell, South London. Newmark is one of five children of former Conservative MP Brooks Newmark and artist Lucy Keegan. Her maternal aunt is the actress Rose Keegan.

Newmark attended school in Sydenham until the age of 12 when her family moved to Central London and she transferred to Francis Holland School in Sloane Square. She said she "much preferred" South London and found Chelsea to be too much of a bubble. She went on to graduate with a Bachelor of Arts in Acting and Contemporary Theatre from East 15 Acting School in 2016.

== Career ==
Newmark began her career by appearing in amateur independent films and in music videos for artists, including Matt Maltese, DISCIPLΞS, Rejjie Snow and Real Lies. She was scouted by First Model Management and worked professionally as a fashion model for several years. As a model her work included campaigns for Zandra Rhodes and Chanel; and editorials for Vice and Wonderland magazines.

In her final year at drama school, Newmark was cast in a small recurring role in the NBC television series Emerald City. She was then cast in the leading role of Iona in the British independent film Pin Cushion, for which she was nominated for Most Promising Newcomer at the British Independent Film Awards. She went on to play supporting roles in various film and television productions including Juliet, Naked (2018), Solo: A Star Wars Story (2018), Les Misérables (2019), Born a King (2019), Balance, Not Symmetry (2019), Sex Education (2019–2020), Cursed (2020), Misbehaviour (2020), and Temple (2019–2021).

== Personal life ==
Newmark lives in the Victoria area of London. She voted Liberal Democrat in 2017, saying she went with her "gut instinct".

== Filmography ==
=== Film ===
Year	Title	Role	Notes
2014	Return of the Ghost	Skye	
2017	Pin Cushion	Iona	
2018	Juliet, Naked	Carly	
2018	Solo: A Star Wars Story	Lexi	
2018	Dagenham	Robyn	
2018	Welcome to Mercy	August	
2019	Born a King	Sarah	
2019	How to Fake a War	Peggy	
2019	Balance, Not Symmetry	Stacey	
2020	Misbehaviour	Jane	
2021	A Brixton Tale	Leah	

=== Television ===
Year	Title	Role	Notes
2017	Emerald City	Ryenne	4 episodes
2018	shortFLIX	Coby	Episode: "Nosebleed"
2019	Les Misérables	Sophie	Episode #1.2
2019–2020	Sex Education	Ruthie	3 episodes
2019–2021	Temple	Eve Milton	13 episodes
2020	Cursed	Pym	9 episodes
2021	Dalgliesh	Morag Smith	2 episodes: "Shroud for a Nightingale"
2023	Lockwood & Co.	Norrie White	Episode: "This Will Be Us"
2023–2024	You & Me	Joey	3 episodes
2024	3 Body Problem	Nora	Episode: "Wallfacer"
2024	A Gentleman in Moscow	Helena Rostova	5 episodes
2025	Alien: Earth	Nibs	Main cast
