= Midnight (Doctor Who) =

2008 Doctor Who episode

196 – "Midnight"
- Doctor Who episode

Cast
- Doctor: David Tennant – Tenth Doctor
- Companion: Catherine Tate – Donna Noble
- Others: Billie Piper – Rose Tyler; Lesley Sharp – Sky Silvestry; Rakie Ayola – Hostess; David Troughton – Professor Hobbes; Ayesha Antoine – Dee Dee Blasco; Lindsey Coulson – Val Cane; Daniel Ryan – Biff Cane; Colin Morgan – Jethro Cane; Tony Bluto – Driver Joe; Duane Henry – Mechanic Claude

Production
- Directed by: Alice Troughton
- Written by: Russell T Davies
- Produced by: Phil Collinson
- Executive producers: Russell T Davies; Julie Gardner
- Music by: Murray Gold
- Production code: 4.8
- Series: Series 4
- Running time: 45 minutes
- First broadcast: 14 June 2008

Chronology
← Preceded by "Forest of the Dead"	Followed by → "Turn Left"

"Midnight" is the tenth episode of the fourth series of the British science fiction television series Doctor Who. Written by Russell T Davies and directed by Alice Troughton, it was first broadcast on BBC One on 14 June 2008. The episode stars David Tennant as the Tenth Doctor and features Catherine Tate as his companion Donna Noble, though the character appears only briefly. The story instead centres on the Doctor during a tourist shuttle journey on the hostile planet Midnight, where an unseen entity infiltrates the vehicle and begins possessing one of the passengers.

Davies conceived "Midnight" as a deliberately claustrophobic bottle episode focusing on psychological tension rather than visual spectacle. Written as a response to the more optimistic portrayal of humanity in the earlier episode "Voyage of the Damned", the story explores how fear and paranoia can cause ordinary people to turn on one another. Much of the episode consists of a single extended scene in which the passengers’ suspicion escalates as the entity imitates their speech and appears to shift its possession from one person to another. The episode was filmed primarily at Upper Boat Studios in Cardiff in late 2007.

The episode was watched by 8.05 million viewers, representing a 38% audience share and making it the fifth most-watched programme of the week in the United Kingdom. It received an Appreciation Index score of 86. Critics widely praised the episode for its tense atmosphere, minimal use of visual effects, and performances by Tennant and guest star Lesley Sharp. Several reviewers highlighted the episode’s exploration of group paranoia and the Doctor’s unusual loss of authority when confronted by frightened strangers.

"Midnight" has since been regarded as one of the most acclaimed episodes of the Tennant era of Doctor Who. It has frequently appeared in lists of the series' best episodes and has been cited as an example of the programme's ability to produce effective low-budget "bottle" stories driven by dialogue and performance. The story has also been adapted for stage productions, and its narrative was revisited in the later Doctor Who episode "The Well", broadcast in 2025.

== Plot ==
The Tenth Doctor and Donna arrive on Midnight, a resort planet whose surface is bathed in lethal radiation. While Donna remains at the spa, the Doctor joins a shuttle tour to see a sapphire waterfall. When the shuttle suddenly stops, he joins driver Joe and mechanic Claude in the cockpit to investigate. Although the systems appear to be functioning, the shuttle will not move. Joe opens the radiation shield briefly to look outside, and Claude says he sees something moving on the surface before Joe calls for rescue.

Back in the passenger cabin, the occupants hear knocking on the shuttle's exterior. The sound appears to move around the vehicle before stopping beside a frightened passenger, Sky Silvestry. The shuttle then shakes violently, and the cockpit is torn away, killing Joe and Claude. Sky begins repeating the words of the other passengers, leading them to believe that something from outside has possessed her. As her repetition becomes perfectly synchronised with their speech, the passengers consider forcing her out of the shuttle. When the Doctor objects, suspicion begins to turn towards him as well. Sky then begins repeating only the Doctor's words.

The Doctor tries to reason with Sky, but suddenly finds himself unable to move. Sky then starts speaking before the Doctor does, making it appear that he is repeating her words. Convinced that the entity has transferred itself to him, the passengers decide to throw the Doctor out instead. Sky says that she has returned to normal and urges them to act before he can escape.

As the passengers drag the Doctor towards the door, the hostess notices Sky using some of the Doctor's distinctive phrases and realises that Sky is still possessed. She throws herself and Sky out of the shuttle and into the radiation, saving the Doctor. A rescue shuttle soon arrives. When the Doctor asks for the hostess's name, he discovers that none of the passengers knows it. Reunited with Donna, he leaves Midnight shaken by the experience.

== Production ==
=== Writing ===
"Midnight" was developed alongside "Turn Left", with each episode reducing the role of one of the programme's two regular leads: Donna appears only in the pre-credits sequence and final scene of "Midnight", while the Tenth Doctor has a similarly limited role in "Turn Left". Stephen James Walker later described "Midnight" as a "companion-lite" episode. Russell T Davies said that the story was partly inspired by the Star Trek: The Next Generation episode "Darmok".

Davies wrote "Midnight" to replace a planned story by Tom Macrae that was dropped because it was considered too similar to another script that had recently been filmed. He conceived the episode in response to "Voyage of the Damned", which he felt had shown the best in human nature, and instead chose to focus on its darker side and on the way people turn on one another. He later said that he wanted a run of darker episodes to match the tone of Steven Moffat's "Silence in the Library" and "Forest of the Dead", and described the idea for "Midnight" as one that "wouldn't go away". Davies was particularly interested in imitation as a source of unease, observing that it could be "mocking, irritating and unnerving" and that repeated mimicry "drives you mad". He also conceived the Doctor's predicament in two parts: the threat of possession and the passengers' growing paranoia. As Davies put it, "It's very rare to see the Doctor out of control, but he cannot control people."

The final script ran to sixty pages, most of it taken up by a single sequence—Scene 9—which alone extended to forty-four pages and covered the passengers' escalating conversation and paranoia aboard the shuttle.

=== Casting ===
Lesley Sharp was cast as Sky Silvestry, the episode's principal guest role. She had previously worked with Russell T Davies twice before, and Davies said that he had her in mind while writing the part. Sharp said that she was keen to appear in Doctor Who, as she admired the direction the revived series had taken and considered it "wonderfully written and executed".

David Troughton was a late replacement for Sam Kelly as Professor Hobbes after Kelly broke his leg and had to withdraw from production. He joined the cast in Cardiff with just two days' notice. Troughton was already associated with the programme, having previously appeared in the original series (1967's "The Enemy of the World" (uncredited), 1969's "The War Games" and 1972's "The Curse of Peladon"), and is the son of Patrick Troughton, who had played the Second Doctor.

Other guest cast included Daniel Ryan, who had previously expressed interest in appearing in Doctor Who, and Colin Morgan, for whom "Midnight" was his second television role.

=== Filming ===
Filming took place over two weeks, from 27 November to 11 December 2007. Most of the episode was shot in Studio 6 at Upper Boat Studios, with the opening and closing scenes filmed separately at a spa resort in Newport. Because those scenes featured Catherine Tate, who was simultaneously working on the Doctor-lite episode "Turn Left", they were recorded on the final day of shooting.

The episode's main shuttle sequence, Scene 9, was structured as a long real-time scene and was divided into several smaller sections during filming, each charting a different stage in the passengers' growing paranoia. Because of the scene's continuity, it was almost possible to perform the sequence in one complete take. To film the overlapping dialogue, director Alice Troughton recorded multiple takes of the same material: one performed normally, followed by others in which all but one actor mimed their lines. This allowed the dialogue to be isolated and combined more precisely in the final sound mix.

Murray Gold completed the score in April 2008, when re-dubbing and the episode's remaining post-production work were also finalised.

== Broadcast and reception ==
"Midnight" was first broadcast on BBC One on 14 June 2008, opposite ITV1's coverage of Euro 2008. A corresponding episode of Doctor Who Confidential was shown afterwards on BBC Three. The episode was also screened at the Gloucester Guildhall cinema as part of a BBC arrangement similar to that used for the previous series' "Blink".

=== Ratings ===
"Midnight" was watched by 8.05 million viewers, giving it a 38 per cent share of the total television audience. It was the fifth most-watched programme of the week in the United Kingdom and the most-watched programme of the day. The episode received an Appreciation Index score of 86, classed as excellent.

=== Reception ===
Reviewers widely praised "Midnight" as an unusually claustrophobic and psychologically focused episode, with critics arguing that its horror derives less from spectacle than from confinement and the decision not to show the creature directly. Sam Wollaston of The Guardian described it as "psychological drama rather than full-blown horror", while Patrick Mulkern wrote that "psychological thrills abound"; Mulkern also singled out the performances of David Tennant and Lesley Sharp, particularly during the scenes of overlapping speech. Keith Phipps of The A.V. Club gave the episode an 'A' and called it the best of the series.

Critics also linked the episode's effectiveness to its dramatic structure and to its unusual portrayal of the Doctor as he loses control of the situation and the passengers turn against him. Phipps considered the story tragic because it places the Doctor in a situation where he "does everything right" but is still overwhelmed by forces beyond his control, while Travis Fickett of IGN viewed it as an effective change of pace from the more complex two-part story that preceded it. Not all reviewers were equally enthusiastic: William Gallagher, writing in a Radio Times blog, felt that the ending required more development, while Andrew Billen argued that the episode "felt too much of a writing exercise to be really scary".

== Legacy ==
In retrospective commentary, "Midnight" has often been regarded as one of the strongest stories of the Tenth Doctor era and one of Russell T Davies's most acclaimed episodes, with critics particularly highlighting its bleak tone, bottle-episode structure and psychological intensity. In 2010, IGN placed it second among Tennant's stories, calling it a "genuinely unsettling journey into the human condition" and describing the programme as being at "its very bleakest and best". Digital Spy ranked it fifth in its 2013 list of the ten best Doctor Who stories, describing it as unusually dark and frightening compared with the era's more camp and boisterous tendencies. In 2021, GamesRadar+ ranked it the second-best episode written by Davies, calling it "a bottle episode that could be taught in film school" and "the stuff of Doctor Who legend".

"Midnight" has also been adapted for the stage on three occasions: by students on the University of Salford's BA performing arts and media performance courses in March 2011, at the Lass O'Gowrie pub theatre in Manchester in January 2012, and by Sporadic Productions as part of the Adelaide Fringe in 2016.

Davies later revisited the story in "The Well", a sequel episode broadcast in 2025 and starring Ncuti Gatwa as the Fifteenth Doctor.
