= Future Radio =

Local radio station in Norwich, England

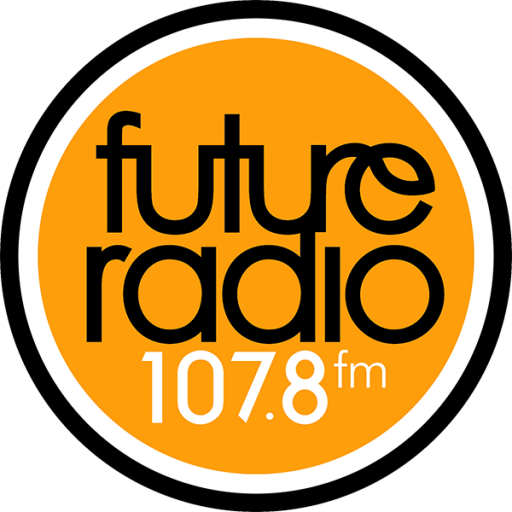
- Norwich; England
- Frequencies: 107.8 FM; DAB: 9C
- RDS: Future

Programming
- Format: Community radio

Ownership
- Owner: Future Projects

History
- First air date: 6 August 2007
- Former frequencies: 96.9 FM; 105.1 FM

Links
- Website: Future Radio

Future Radio is a local community radio station serving the city of Norwich, Norfolk. The station is part of local charity Future Projects

== History ==
Future Radio began broadcasting in May 2004 with its first 28-day Restricted Service Licence (RSL). Six such short-term RSLs were broadcast in total, each on the station's former frequency of 105.1 FM.

On 6 August 2007, Future Radio launched its full-time permanent service on 96.9 FM, broadcasting from studios on Motum Road, Norwich. The station's first song was "Once in a Lifetime" by Talking Heads.

The station's programming includes interviews and features, and a range of specialist music programming. Minority language programmes in Polish are also broadcast.

In 2009, the station was awarded an extended Norwich-wide licence which it launched in the summer of 2010. The station then moved to a new frequency, 107.8 FM, which is less subject to incoming interference and is without the previous city centre coverage restriction.

In addition to its FM transmissions, Future Radio also streams its output over the Internet, using the facilities of the Community Media Association's Canstream service.

In May 2013, independent research stated that Future Radio had a regular weekly audience of 21,000 people, with 42,000 estimated to listen at least once a month.
