= Jaime Winstone =

English actress (born 1985)

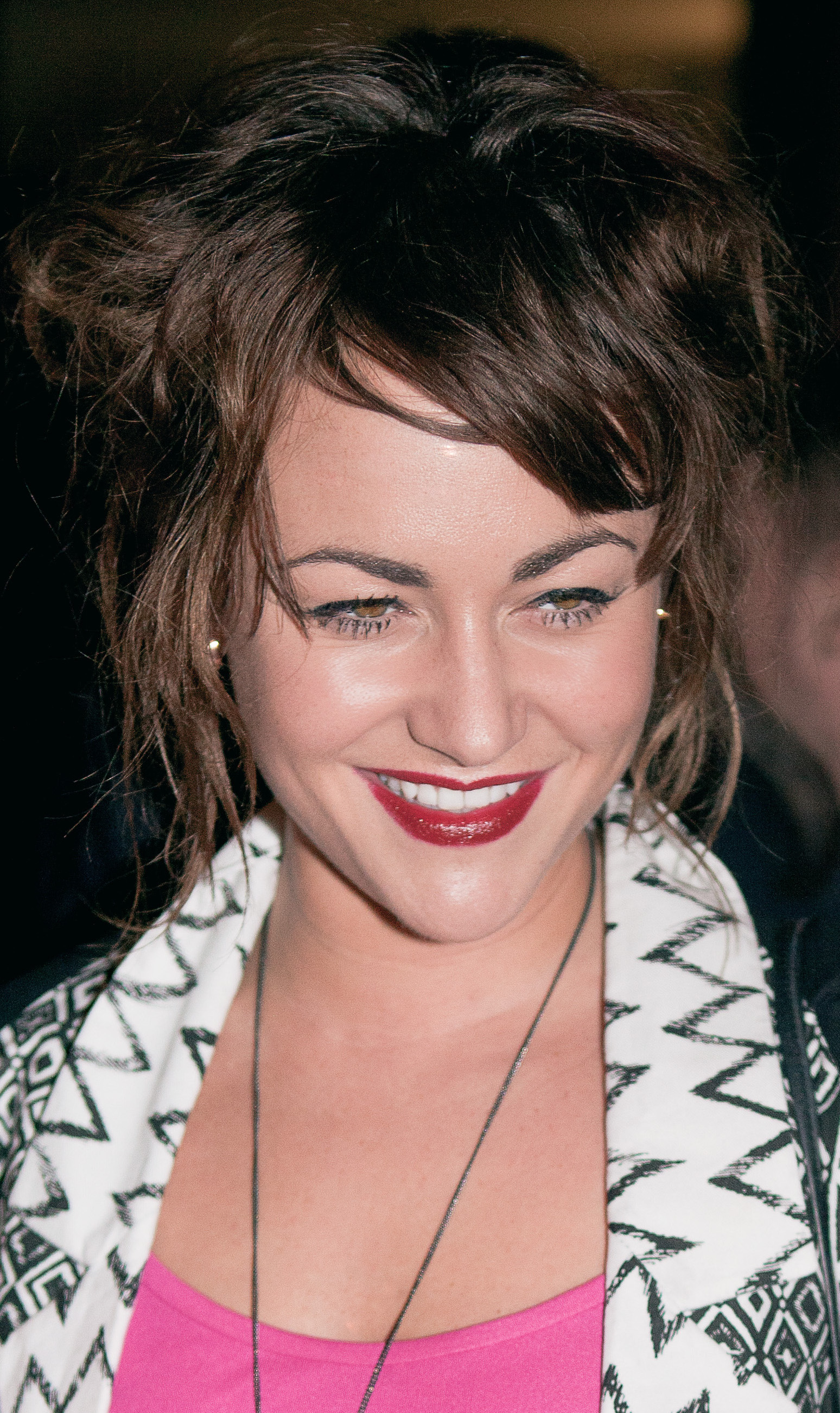
- Winstone in 2011
- Born: Jaime Margaret Winstone; 6 May 1985 (age 41); London, England
- Occupation: Actress
- Years active: 2004–present
- Spouse: James Suckling (m. 2023)
- Children: 1
- Parent: Ray Winstone (father)
- Relatives: Lois Winstone (sister)

Jaime Margaret Winstone (born 6 May 1985) is an English actress. With a career spanning over two decades, she is best known for her work in television and film, with her roles including Kidulthood (2006), Goldplated (2006), Dead Set (2008), Donkey Punch (2008), Boogie Woogie (2009), Made in Dagenham (2010), Anuvahood (2011), Wild Bill (2011), Mad Dogs (2013), Love, Rosie (2014), After Hours (2015), The Last Photograph (2017), Tomb Raider (2018), Knuckledust (2020), A Brixton Tale (2021), and Sumotherhood (2023). She has also appeared on stage in productions of The Fastest Clock in the Universe (2009) and 2:22 A Ghost Story (2023), as well as in various music videos.

Winstone is also notable for her portrayal of Barbara Windsor in the BBC biopic Babs (2017), and playing a younger Peggy Mitchell in flashback episodes of the BBC soap opera EastEnders (2022, 2025), who had previously been portrayed by Windsor. Outside of acting, she appeared as a contestant on the third series of The Masked Singer (2022) and the twenty-fourth series of Strictly Come Dancing (2026).

== Early life and education ==
Winstone was born on 6 May 1985 in Camden, North London. She is the daughter of actor Ray Winstone and his wife Elaine McCausland. She has two sisters, Lois (b. 1982), who is a singer and actress, and Ellie (b. 2001). Winstone grew up in Enfield, north London, where she attended the all-girls Enfield County School; she was suspended from her school on a few occasions, for rowing with teaching staff.

Her family later moved to Roydon, Essex, where she attended the specialist performing arts college Burnt Mill School in Harlow, before going on to study for a BTEC National Diploma in Performing Arts at the performing arts department of Harlow College, Essex.

== Career ==
She began her acting career in 2004, appearing as Natalie in the film Bullet Boy. Her subsequent roles included Daddy's Girl, and Donkey Punch (2008), the television series Murder Investigation Team, Vincent (alongside her father), Totally Frank, Goldplated, Dead Set, and a short film called Love Letters. Winstone also sang backing vocals for her sister Lois's band. She also appeared in several music videos, including for The Streets' single "When You Wasn't Famous", The Twang's single "Two Lovers", and Hercules and Love Affair's single "Blind". In April 2009, she co-starred with then-boyfriend Alfie Allen in the music video for the Madness single "Dust Devil".

Winstone made her catwalk modelling debut in 2008 for Vivienne Westwood, and in February 2009 she appeared on the front cover of Arena. She made her stage debut in a Hampstead Theatre revival of The Fastest Clock in the Universe which also played at the Curve theatre, Leicester.

In March 2010, she was announced as a new patron of the East End Film Festival. Winstone starred in the Stealth Media Group-produced thriller film Manor Hunt Ball and based on the novel The Most Dangerous Game by Richard Connell. The same year, Winstone portrayed Anneli Alderton, one of five women murdered in Ipswich 2006, in the BBC drama Five Daughters.

In 2013, Winstone appeared in the BBC series Mad Dogs alongside John Simm, Max Beesley, Philip Glenister and Marc Warren. In 2015, Winstone portrayed the lead role of Lauren in the Sky 1 comedy drama After Hours.

In May 2017, Winstone starred as Barbara Windsor in the BBC biopic, Babs. On preparing for the role, Winstone told The Independent: "As soon as I sat down with Barbara, I got to analyse her, to see how she moved - and I instantly related to this wonderful woman. She is so generous and easy to talk to and connect with [...] the pressure just faded away as I talked to this amazing woman. These roles don’t come along that often. It was an honour."

In January 2022, Winstone appeared as a contestant on the third series of The Masked Singer as "Firework". She was sixth to be unmasked. In September 2022, Winstone appeared in EastEnders as Peggy Mitchell in a flashback episode set in 1979.

In 2023, Winstone appeared in the play 2:22 A Ghost Story, playing the character of Jenny. She also starred in the Craig Tuohy-written and directed horror film Everyone Is Going to Die. In 2025, she reprised her role on EastEnders as Peggy Mitchell in the form of hallucinations experienced by Phil Mitchell for the serial's 40th anniversary week. Her 2025 return episode won "Best Single Episode" at the 2025 British Soap Awards.

In July 2026, Winstone was announced as a contestant on the twenty-fourth series of Strictly Come Dancing, beginning September of that year.

== Personal life ==
Winstone has been in a relationship with James Suckling since March 2015. They became engaged in June 2022 and married in October 2023. They have one child together, a son born in February 2016.

Winstone was previously engaged to actor Alfie Allen.

== Filmography ==
=== Film ===
Year	Title	Role
2004	Bullet Boy	Natalie
2005	Love Letter	Tracey
2006	Kidulthood	Becky
2006	Daddy's Girl	Nina
2008	Donkey Punch	Kim
2009	Boogie Woogie	Elaine
2009	Eve	Rachel
2010	Made in Dagenham	Sandra
2011	Anuvahood	Yasmin
2011	Wild Bill	Helen
2012	Elfie Hopkins	Elfie Hopkins
2013	Alleycats	Katja
2013	uwantme2killhim?	Rachel
2013	Powder Room	Chanel
2014	Love, Rosie	Ruby
2017	The Last Photograph	Mother
2018	Tomb Raider	Pamela
2018	Farming	Lynn
2019	Hurt by Paradise	Janette
2020	Knuckledust	Redmond
2021	A Brixton Tale	Tilda
2021	No Dog	Jeanette
2021	Court Number 5	Laura
2022	Castle in the Sky	Sophia
2023	Sumotherhood	Sarah
2024	Everyone Is Going to Die	Comedy
2024	Arthur's Whisky	Sharon
2024	An Irish Angel	Ellie
2026	Sessions	Olivia

=== Television ===
Year	Title	Role	Notes
2005	M.I.T.: Murder Investigation Team	Hannah	Episode No.2.4
2006	Totally Frank	Lisa	2 episodes
2006	Vincent	Gina	Episode No.2.1
2006	Goldplated	Lauren	8 episodes
2008	Phoo Action	Whitey Action	Director: Euros Lyn
2008	Dead Set	Kelly	5 episodes
2009	Agatha Christie's Poirot	Sheila Webb	Episode 12.1: "The Clocks"
2010	Five Daughters	Annelli Alderton	3 episodes
2010	Beast Hunters	Pandora	"Archituthius Slimbus", "Infected"
2012	True Love	Stella	Episode:1.2 "Paul"
2013	Run	Tara	Episode: "Kasia"
2013	Mad Dogs	Mercedes	3 episodes
2015	Cockroaches	Ash	2 episodes
2015	Foyle's War	Vera Stephens	Episode: "High Castle"
2015	After Hours	Lauren	6 episodes
2016	Ellen	Nicole	Television film
2017	Babs	Barbara Windsor	Biopic
2017	Joe Orton Laid Bare	Ensemble Orton Cast	BBC Two docudrama
2018	Torvill & Dean	Janet Sawbridge	Television film
2020	Squad Goals	Narrator	BBC Three
2022, 2025	EastEnders	Peggy Mitchell	3 episodes; flashback appearances
2022	Four Lives	Donna Taylor	Episodes 2 and 3
2022	The Masked Singer	Firework	Contestant
2023	Count Abdulla	Kathy	Regular role
2026	Strictly Come Dancing	Herself	Contestant; series 24

=== Radio ===
Year	Title	Role	Ref.
2018	Indigo Children	Lydia	

=== Stage ===
Year	Title	Role	Venue	Ref.
2009	The Fastest Clock in the Universe	Sherbet Gravel	Hampstead Theatre	
2023	2:22 A Ghost Story	Jenny	UK West End tour	

=== Music videos ===
Year	Song	Artist	Ref.
2006	"When You Wasn't Famous"	The Streets	
2007	"Two Lovers"	The Twang	
2008	"Blind"	Hercules and Love Affair'	
2009	"Dust Devil"	Madness	
2021	"Love Is Back	Celeste	
