= Doctor Who specials (2023) =

2023 season of British sci-fi TV series

Doctor Who
- 2023 specials
- DVD box set cover art
- Showrunner: Russell T Davies
- Starring: David Tennant; Catherine Tate
- No. of stories: 3
- No. of episodes: 3

Release
- Original network: BBC One; Disney+
- Original release: 25 November – 9 December 2023

Season chronology
- ← Previous; 2022 specials Next → Series 14

The 2023 specials of the British science fiction television series Doctor Who are three special episodes that aired between 25 November and 9 December 2023, to celebrate the programme's 60th anniversary. They were written by Russell T Davies and marked the start of his second tenure as showrunner, having served in the role from the start of Doctor Who's revival in 2005 until leaving in 2010. The specials were broadcast on BBC One in the United Kingdom and Ireland, and on Disney+ internationally.

David Tennant and Catherine Tate returned to the series as part of the 60th anniversary. Tennant starred as the Fourteenth Doctor for the first time, having previously portrayed the Tenth Doctor, while Tate reprised her role as Donna Noble. Miriam Margolyes and Neil Patrick Harris guest starred as the voice of the Meep and the Toymaker, respectively, alongside returning cast members Jacqueline King, Karl Collins, Bernard Cribbins (in his final role), Jemma Redgrave, and Bonnie Langford, as well as newcomers Ruth Madeley, Yasmin Finney, and Ncuti Gatwa, the latter of whom making his debut as the Fifteenth Doctor, who would star in the fourteenth series.

The specials were led by Davies as head writer and executive producer in his first episodes since his return to the programme. They preceded and were announced alongside the fourteenth series; both were announced with Davies's return to the programme for its 60th anniversary and "series beyond". The three specials were directed by Rachel Talalay, Tom Kingsley, and Chanya Button, respectively. Filming occurred between May and July 2022, the first episodes to be filmed at Wolf Studios Wales after production moved from Roath Lock Studios when Bad Wolf became a co-producer of the series. A multitude of new Doctor Who media and re-releases accompanied the specials for the occasion of the anniversary.

== Episodes ==
No. story	No. special	Title	Directed by	Written by	Original release date (Note: The episodes were released simultaneously at 6:30 p.m. GMT in the United Kingdom on BBC One, and at 10:30 a.m. PT in the United States on Disney+.)	UK viewers (millions)	AI
301	1	"The Star Beast"	Rachel Talalay	Russell T Davies, from a story by Pat Mills and Dave Gibbons	25 November 2023	7.61	84
The Fourteenth Doctor runs into Donna Noble and her family, and a spaceship crashes. Meeting with UNIT scientist Shirley Anne Bingham, the Doctor questions why he resembles his tenth incarnation and why destiny is converging on Donna. Donna's teenage daughter, Rose encounters a furry alien called the Meep and hides it in the shed, but Donna discovers it just as the Doctor arrives at her house. The Meep's benevolent nature is found to be a lie and it is, in fact, a megalomaniac, would-be dictator whose ship will destroy London if allowed to take off. The Doctor is forced to reawaken Donna's memories in order to shut down the Meep's ship. Donna does not die; because of Rose's birth, Donna has passed down part of the metacrisis, making it less dangerous for both. The Meep is captured, and Donna and Rose expel the metacrisis from their bodies. The Doctor suggests he and Donna visit Wilfred, but the newly re-built TARDIS goes haywire and dematerialises.
302	2	"Wild Blue Yonder"	Tom Kingsley	Russell T Davies	2 December 2023	7.14	83
The TARDIS crash-lands on a spaceship at the edge of the known universe. Sensing hostile action, the TARDIS dematerialises, stranding the Doctor and Donna who begin exploring the ship, finding it abandoned. After locating the bridge, they are confronted by a pair of unknown entities from outside the known universe, taking the forms of imperfect copies of the Doctor and Donna. After a series of interactions, the Doctor figures out that the creatures are attempting to use them as a way to reach the known universe, and that they learn by forcing their targets to act quickly and impulsively. They discover that the ship's captain initiated an extremely delayed self-destruct sequence before killing herself to prevent the entities from taking control of the ship. The Doctor speeds up the self-destruct sequence, and the TARDIS returns, allowing the Doctor and Donna to escape while the entities are destroyed. Returning to the alley from which they departed, they encounter Wilfred, who tells them that the world is ending and asks for the Doctor's help.
303	3	"The Giggle"	Chanya Button	Russell T Davies	9 December 2023	6.85	85
In 1925 Soho, an assistant to television inventor John Logie Baird purchases a puppet at a toy shop owned by the Toymaker. In the present day, the Toymaker causes havoc worldwide and faces off against the Doctor and Donna. Playing a second game against him, the Doctor loses, but they agree to a tie-breaker match. Working with UNIT director Kate Lethbridge-Stewart and former companion Mel Bush, the Doctor and Donna discover the Toymaker has been using a laughing sound hidden in all screens since the advent of television, carving itself into the human subconscious. The Toymaker attacks UNIT and mortally wounds the Doctor with a galvanic beam, causing him to "bi-generate", allowing the Fourteenth and Fifteenth Doctors to co-exist. The two Doctors defeat the Toymaker in a game of catch and banish him from existence as he threatens his legions' arrival. A mysterious woman takes his golden tooth that is imprisoning the Master. Before departing, the Fifteenth Doctor claims his "prize" for winning the Toymaker's game by creating a duplicate TARDIS, while the Fourteenth Doctor settles down on Earth with Donna and her family.

=== Supplemental episode ===
Title	Directed by	Written by	Original release date	UK viewers (millions)	Length
"Destination: Skaro"	Jamie Donoughue	Russell T Davies	17 November 2023	3.77	4:54
In a military base on the planet Skaro, Davros meets with his assistant Mr Castavillian to present his new creation, a prototype Dalek, though they have yet to name it. When Davros exits the scene, the TARDIS comes crashing into the base, breaking off the Dalek's claw. The Fourteenth Doctor, still puzzled by his old face returning, notices the damage he has caused and realises the claw belongs to the Dalek. Then, when calling the machine a "Dalek" and being thankful it did not "exterminate" him, the Doctor inadvertently gives Castavillian the ideas for both a name and catchphrase. The Doctor soon realises he is actually witnessing the genesis of the Daleks. He hastily swaps the broken claw for a sink plunger he finds in the TARDIS, tells Castavillian to pretend he was never there, and leaves. After returning, Davros approves of the plunger.

== Casting ==
=== Main characters ===
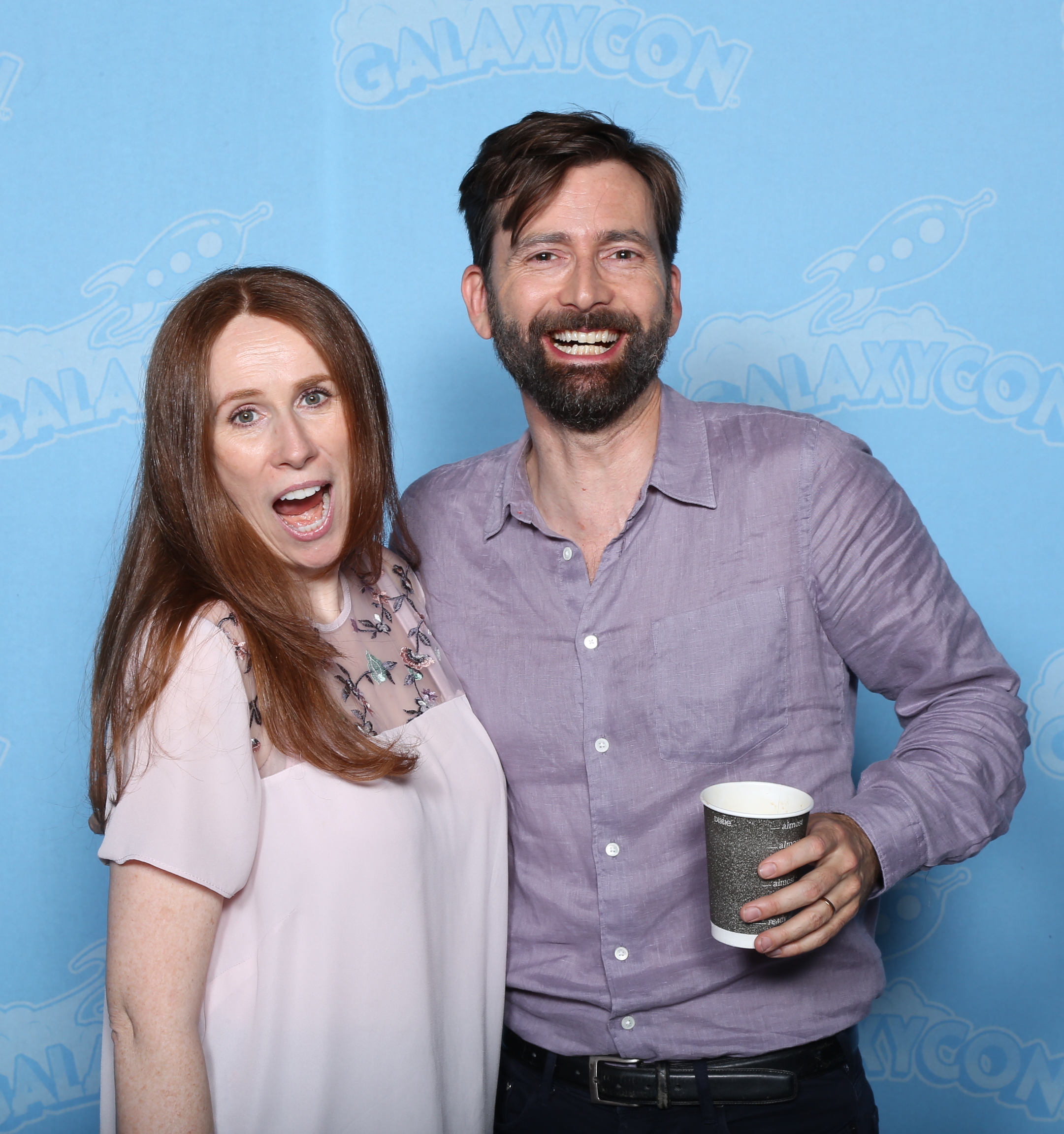
Catherine Tate and David Tennant (2019) appear as Donna Noble and the Fourteenth Doctor as part of the show's 60th anniversary.

David Tennant and Catherine Tate both returned to the show as part of the 60th anniversary specials. Tennant starred as the Fourteenth Doctor, a new incarnation who shares a similar appearance to the Tenth Doctor, while Tate reprised her role as Donna Noble. Ncuti Gatwa made his debut as the Fifteenth Doctor.

=== Guest characters ===
"The Star Beast" saw Jacqueline King and Karl Collins reprise their roles as Donna's mother Sylvia Noble and husband Shaun Temple, respectively, having last appeared in the final story of Tennant's tenure as the Tenth Doctor, "The End of Time". Yasmin Finney appeared as Rose Noble, Donna and Shaun's daughter; Miriam Margolyes voiced the Meep; and Ruth Madeley appeared as Shirley Anne Bingham.

"Wild Blue Yonder" saw Bernard Cribbins make his final television appearance in the role as Wilfred Mott, while Nathaniel Curtis briefly appeared as Isaac Newton.

"The Giggle" saw Neil Patrick Harris play the Toymaker, a character last seen in The Celestial Toymaker (1966), portrayed then by Michael Gough. Jemma Redgrave and Bonnie Langford reprised their respective roles as Kate Lethbridge-Stewart and Mel Bush. King, Collins, Finney, and Madeley all reprised their roles from "The Star Beast". Other cast members for this episode included Charlie De Melo as Charles Banerjee, John MacKay as John Logie Baird, and Alexander Devrient as Colonel Christopher Ibrahim. Lachele Carl briefly reprised her role as Trinity Wells, an American news anchor who appeared frequently during Davies's first era.

== Production ==
=== Development ===
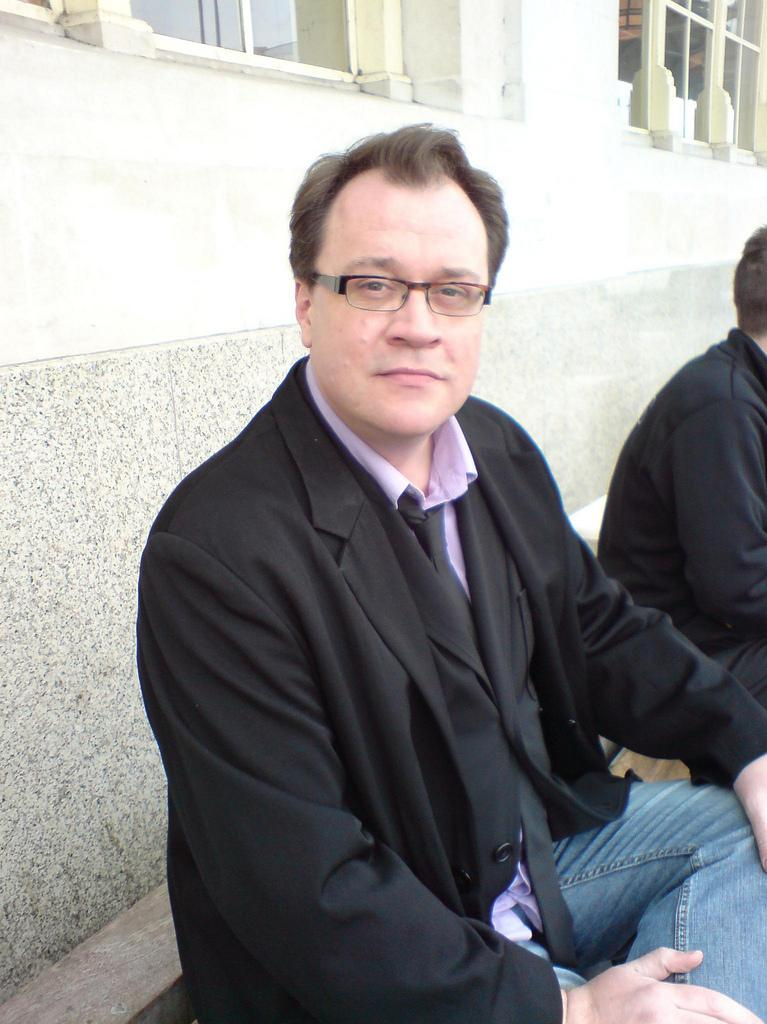
Russell T Davies (pictured in 2008) returned to Doctor Who as showrunner and lead writer for the 60th anniversary specials and series beyond.

On 29 July 2021, the BBC announced that Chris Chibnall, who served as executive producer and showrunner of Doctor Who since 2018, would quit the show after a run of specials in 2022, alongside Thirteenth Doctor star Jodie Whittaker. In the BBC press release, Chibnall is quoted as saying: "I wish our successors - whoever the BBC and BBC Studios choose - as much fun as we've had. They're in for a treat!" The future of the programme was first teased by Piers Wenger on 25 August 2021, when he said an upcoming change for Doctor Who would be "radical".

On 24 September 2021, the BBC announced Russell T Davies would return to Doctor Who as showrunner, after having acted as showrunner from 2005 to 2010 for the Ninth and Tenth Doctors. He succeeds Chibnall for the show's 60th anniversary in 2023 and beyond. Davies was joined by the Bad Wolf production company, which was founded by fellow former Doctor Who executive producer Julie Gardner and former BBC head of drama Jane Tranter. In October 2021, it was announced that Sony would acquire a majority of Bad Wolf. Bad Wolf took over creative control of Doctor Who beginning with the specials, with BBC Studios focusing on establishing Doctor Who as a global brand.

Phil Collinson, Gardner, and Tranter all returned to the show as executive producers, alongside newcomer Joel Collins. Davies confirmed by March 2022 that pre-production had begun at Bad Wolf Studios in Cardiff. Will Oswald edited "The Star Beast", Tim Hodges edited "Wild Blue Yonder", and Mark Trend edited "The Giggle".

Will Cohen, VFX producer, said that the production team's objective was "to craft a series of specials that not only honoured the rich tapestry of Doctor Who's history but also reignited the passion of its global fanbase", coupled with a plan "to elevate the series to a cinematic echelon, aspiring to meet the lofty standards of global entertainment giants".

=== Writing ===
Russell T Davies wrote all three specials, plus the additional mini-episode for Children in Need 2023. In December 2021, around two years ahead of broadcast, Davies confirmed that he had "already written some of the episodes", and told the Radio Times in February 2022 that he was finding "brand new ways of telling stories that have never been done before". Scott Handcock acted as script editor for the specials, having previously worked on Doctor Who Confidential, The Sarah Jane Adventures, and most notably written, produced, directed and acted in numerous Doctor Who audio dramas for Big Finish Productions.

I realised that there was third act to be written [for the Doctor and Donna], and it was so much fun writing it. On a really simple level, it's working with two of the best actors in the world. I love them. I love them as friends. I love their presence. I'm really interested to push the Doctor and Donna into things they've never done before...

— Russell T Davies

The idea of bringing back David Tennant and Catherine Tate originated during a Doctor Who Tweetalong for "The Runaway Bride" in December 2020, in which Tate told Davies that she would love to come back to do some more "Doctor and Donna", and Tennant agreed. After Davies approached the BBC and was later appointed as succeeding showrunner, plans were set in motion for how Tennant and Tate would return. Rather than bringing back the Tenth Doctor, Davies decided to cast Tennant as the next Doctor for a number of specials. In doing so, he stated in Doctor Who: Unleashed that he thought it was a "fascinating" concept for the Doctor to get their old face back, and that "there's no rules... you can do absolutely everything you want".

Davies was reluctant to bring back Tennant and Tate for a singular special, as he believed that would have been "a disappointment", and opted for three specials as "it was simply as many episodes as David [Tennant] and Catherine [Tate] could do". Davies emphasised that the three specials were "three separate stories", whilst having "a little link between them", and compared the trilogy to a "mini-season".

At a press screening of "The Star Beast", Davies described the first special as "a great big Pixar family film, like a bank holiday film – all the family watching, lots of laughs, a funny monster". He then described "Wild Blue Yonder" as "darker... not scary – it's genuinely weird", and "The Giggle" as "nuts, completely mad, frightening... that one will scare you". The specials were designed as a "bridge" between two eras.

The first special is based on the 1980 comic strip Doctor Who and the Star Beast, written by Pat Mills and John Wagner, with art by Dave Gibbons. "The Star Beast" features the first live-action appearances of Beep the Meep and the Wrarth Warriors. Davies told Empire in October 2023 that he "needed to bring Donna back into the story... which meant setting it in London, which meant something alien landing on top of London, and I automatically thought of Star Beast as the best way to tell that story". Davies chose to adapt from the comic due to it being "an enormously fun adventure, with an edge and a serious threat", and believed it was time "to take one of the best Doctor Who stories from another medium... and show that to millions of people". Davies wanted the threat to be quite simple and singular, and did not want Donna to "come across an invading army, that's going to ruin the story", which was another reason for why The Star Beast comic worked. He likened the story to E.T. The Extra-Terrestrial, in which a young character befriends a lost alien on Earth, describing it as "traditional". Adapting an already-existing story in the franchise "never bothered" Davies as "it's [like] how there are two different versions of Human Nature", and said that "we're in an age of comic book adaptations". Davies maintained the main plot of the comic but entwined plot threads about the meta-crisis storyline and transgender themes.

Davies wanted the second special to primarily focus on the Doctor and Donna, aiming to "push them to areas they haven't been, and say things they haven't said before". This led to the concept of a two-hander, which meant that excluding the first and last scenes, this story only featured the two main characters. The special serves as a character study of the Doctor and Donna. Davies described "Wild Blue Yonder" as simply having the Doctor and Donna arrive "on a spaceship, and they meet evil versions of themselves". The simplicity of this plot led to them keeping it as secret as possible prior to transmission. Davies admitted in The Official Doctor Who Podcast that this approach could have "had an unfortunate effect", and that the audience might have been "expecting Matt Smith and Peter Capaldi and the ghost of William Hartnell riding on the back of the Garm on board this spaceship". Davies also wanted this story to utilise the bigger budget, and "make the production team break out into a cold sweat"; this was applied with the use of body horror by the Not-Things and the virtual spaceship corridor. The story features references to the Flux and the Timeless Child, plot threads from the Thirteenth Doctor's era, as Davies was keen on acknowledging "the brilliant work [Chibnall] did and to say that's absolutely part of our history as well".

The third special reintroduces the Celestial Toymaker, last seen in the 1966 serial of the same name. Davies described the Toymaker as "an unashamedly supernatural character", and the fantasy elements of this villain create "a whole new world for Doctor Who... a very big step the whole programme is about to take". Originally, Davies intended for the villain of this story to be Stooky Bill, a real-life puppet used by John Logie Baird in 1925, whom Davies was researching at the time of writing Nolly. Davies said he thought that the puppet was "such a perfect Doctor Who monster", and wanted this special to be "the story of a puppet who wanted to be a man". One of the original ideas included Stooky becoming "a great big puppet version" of the Fourteenth Doctor. However, Davies realised that it would be hard to portray Stooky Bill as such an intimidating threat for the whole episode, and therefore opted to give Stooky a puppeteer, which he said was "a small step to a toymaker". This story also reintroduces Melanie Bush, a former companion of the Sixth and Seventh Doctors, who now works at UNIT HQ. Davies said he chose to bring Mel back partly to "right a wrong", as he believes that the character was poorly remembered in her original run, and wanted to "put that right and have a better Mel and a proper Mel, a Mel that [former producer] John Nathan-Turner would be proud of".

"The Giggle" introduces the concept of bi-generation, which Davies had as a slow-burning idea for years. The concept of a multi-Doctor story never appealed to Davies, but having the next Doctor meet his previous self was an idea Davies had interest in:

Actually, I've had this idea for years. I've always wanted, instead of going back and meeting old Doctors, I've always wanted the Doctor to talk to his new version. Why has it never been done before? How can you resist the two of them having an adventure at the same time? ... For once, we've got a happy Doctor who is no longer saving the universe, but is parked with Donna for a happy life, while the Doctor – which is always the next Doctor, and that's always true of Doctor Who, the Doctor is the next Doctor – is out amongst the stars.

=== Costumes ===
Breaking tradition, the Fourteenth Doctor wore his costume from his very first appearance at the end of "The Power of the Doctor". Davies told Doctor Who Magazine in November 2022 that he was apprehensive about the media mocking Tennant in the Thirteenth Doctor's costume: "We could have the Doctor dressed as a knight, or dressed as God, or dressed as William Hartnell, and the only photo they'd print would be of David [Tennant] in what they considered to be women's clothes... so that was never going to happen". Davies emphasised that he was "absolutely certain that the clothes would regenerate... nothing would've changed my mind".

Tennant described his new costume as "a kiss to the past, and a nod to the future", and thought it was important that he wore something that "still had the same flavour", but also gave the impression that "this isn't quite the same story that we were telling [before]". The costume was designed by Pam Downe. Davies ensured that this was not "the same look reproduced", and that "it's a tight suit, but it's a different pattern". The fabric of the costume was selected by Tennant. "Four or five" sets of the costume were produced.

Downe was tasked with designing four different costumes for the Toymaker in "The Giggle", consisting of the shopkeeper in the 1920s toy shop, the French showman on the modern-day streets, the American bandleader in the "Spice Up Your Life" sequence, and the World War I pilot on the UNIT helipad. All of these costumes were tailor-made.

=== Design changes ===
A new logo was introduced in October 2022, resembling the classic diamond-shaped variant first seen in the eleventh season of the classic era in 1973. The reintroduction of the diamond insignia coincided with the show's diamond anniversary, although Davies stated that they chose to bring back the logo simply "because we love it… the diamond fact got bolted on afterwards, as a handy coincidence", and that the logo will continue to be used in future seasons. A special 60th anniversary version of this logo, encompassing a diamond texture and a bar reading '60 Years', was then released in November 2022. This logo was used for Doctor Who merchandise and promotional material throughout 2023.

A new title sequence debuted in the premiere special, "The Star Beast". Davies revealed in a video commentary for "The Giggle" that the production team had filmed a shot of the Fourteenth Doctor and Donna Noble "hanging out of the TARDIS" as it travelled through the time vortex. Davies said he showed this version to Steven Moffat, who suggested that they omit it. It was said that the concept received bad reception from most of the crew, and therefore it was cut from the final version. A new version of the theme music was composed by Murray Gold.

A new TARDIS interior set also debuted in the first special, designed by Phil Sims, who had previously worked on films such as Guardians of the Galaxy and Star Wars: The Rise of Skywalker. The interior offers resemblances to the original 60s set, whilst being much larger in scale. The script described the new interior as a "huge hemisphere ... the shape of the Tenth Doctor's Tardis - ramps & gantries leading to a central six-sided console... but white". Davies commented that he chose to bring back the "white TARDIS" after watching recent stories which featured this design, including Clara Oswald's TARDIS in "Hell Bent" and the Fugitive Doctor's TARDIS in "Fugitive of the Judoon". He said that he "spent a couple of years thinking, 'I like that,' not knowing I was coming back". Sims described the original concept art as "hard, metal, almost concrete" and "sinister", which Davies thought "looked like a bunker, or a baddie's lair". This was then reworked to match what Davies wanted. The new set is also wheelchair-accessible, with a wheelchair ramp added to the TARDIS doorway, and stairs replaced by ramps inside the control room. Ruth Madeley, who plays Shirley Anne Bingham and uses a wheelchair, said: "For every disabled kid who couldn't get into the Tardis, this ramp is forever yours". The set was built over 16 weeks on Stage 6 of Wolf Studios Wales. The Thirteenth Doctor's TARDIS exterior prop continued to be used.

A new version of the sonic screwdriver was introduced for the three specials. Art director for props Michael van Kesteren wanted the sonic to "reference each era, to a degree", as it was being made for the 60th anniversary. The Fourteenth Doctor's sonic screwdriver featured a mix of elements from several previous designs, including "the raku detailing of the Ninth and Tenth Doctor's, the petals from the Eleventh Doctor's, a little engraved ring that sort of harkens back to the sort of bullet shape on the Third and Fourth Doctor's". Kesteren produced 67 silhouette sketches of various ideas for how the sonic should look. The executive producers were keen on having "the petals" from the Eleventh Doctor's sonic. Four props of the sonic screwdriver were made, with "two available on set at all times in case of emergency". Unlike previous versions, the Fourteenth Doctor's sonic could animate holographic screens and diagrams which would float in the air.

=== Filming ===
Filming for the 60th anniversary specials marked a change in studio location, with the new studio, Bad Wolf Studios, taking over from Roath Lock Studios as the company for in-house filming, where the programme had filmed since 2012. The change marked a co-production deal between Bad Wolf and BBC Studios for Doctor Who. Bad Wolf further filed for a new subsidiary company, also run by Gardner and Tranter, called "Whoniverse1 LTD". Vicki Delow produced the specials, with Ellen Marsh co-producing.

Rachel Talalay returned to direct the first special, Tom Kingsley directed the second, and Chanya Button directed the third. Davies believed that Talalay would be "the perfect choice for a brand-new launch", praising her previous episodes in the Twelfth Doctor's era. Talalay said that she previously had not "always succeeded" in achieving crowd/action sequences, which "The Star Beast" contains a lot of, but she was "determined to do that part really, really well... it's all about embracing the stuff that scares you". Kingsley's episodes of Ghosts inspired the production team to approach him to direct the second special. Due to its unique technical challenges, Kingsley initially believed the script would be "an absolute nightmare" to direct, and was planning to turn down the offer. He then changed his mind as he began to come up with ideas for how they could produce it. Producers approached Button for the third special after seeing her work on World on Fire, and she delighted them in the interview "by being such a fan of the old Doctor and Donna days". Button said that the script was "the most expansive thing I've ever read", and found it "challenging, in the most positive way possible".

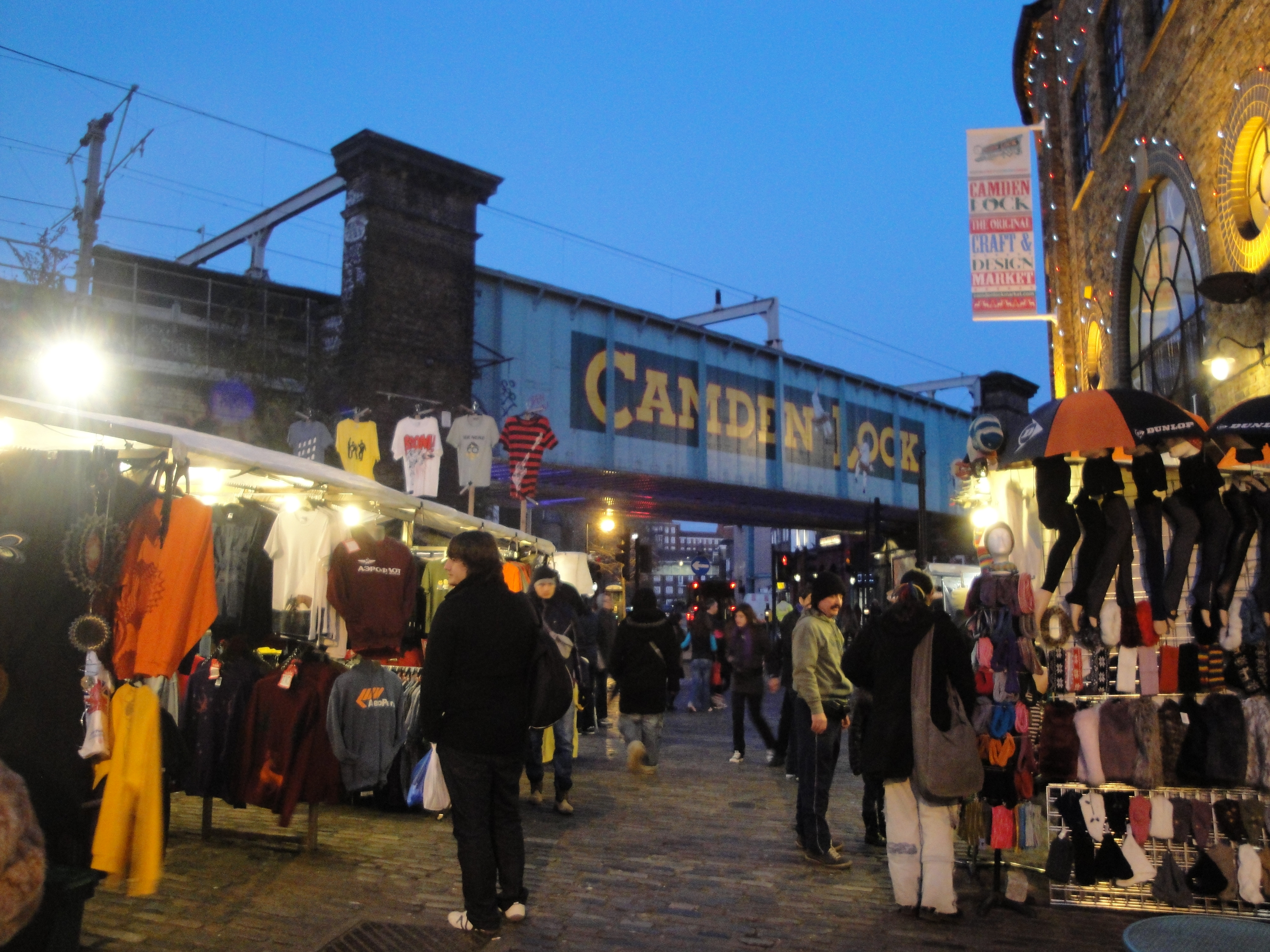
Camden Market was used as a location in "The Star Beast" and "Wild Blue Yonder".

A readthrough of all three specials was held on 3 May 2022. Principal photography commenced on 9 May 2022, starting with "The Star Beast". The first scenes filmed were inside Donna's house. As the script required several stunt explosions inside the house, the production team opted to build the house, back garden, and connecting alleyway on a soundstage; rather than renting a house on-location, with compositions of the night sky and terrace backdrop in the garden and alleyway added in post-production. To achieve the battle scenes between UNIT and the Wrarth Warriors, paintball guns were loaded with zirconium hits to resemble real-time bullet impact; by creating a flash of sparks when hitting a hard surface, with actors wearing bulletproof plexiglass visors. In the second week of the shoot, location filming began in Camden Market; which attracted media coverage and onlookers, as this was the first time that Tennant, Tate and supporting cast were publicly seen filming. With filming scheduled around the time of Elizabeth II's Platinum Jubilee, many recognisable parts of central London were unavailable for filming; leading the crew to search for an iconic area outside of the city centre, and Camden became the "first candidate". Scenes at the steelworks were filmed at Uskmouth Power Station in Newport. 15-20 ft of the Meep's ship was physically built at the location, with the rest completed digitally in post-production. This was then redressed throughout the location shoot according to the different phases of the ship's condition. Axminster Road in Cardiff was used for the scenes on Donna's street; with five nights of battle scenes and practical effects work. A total of three weeks of night shooting was completed for the first special. Talalay said that the time of year put them at a disadvantage: "it gets dark late and light early, and this whole episode takes place at night", meaning that they had "so little shooting time" per night shoot.

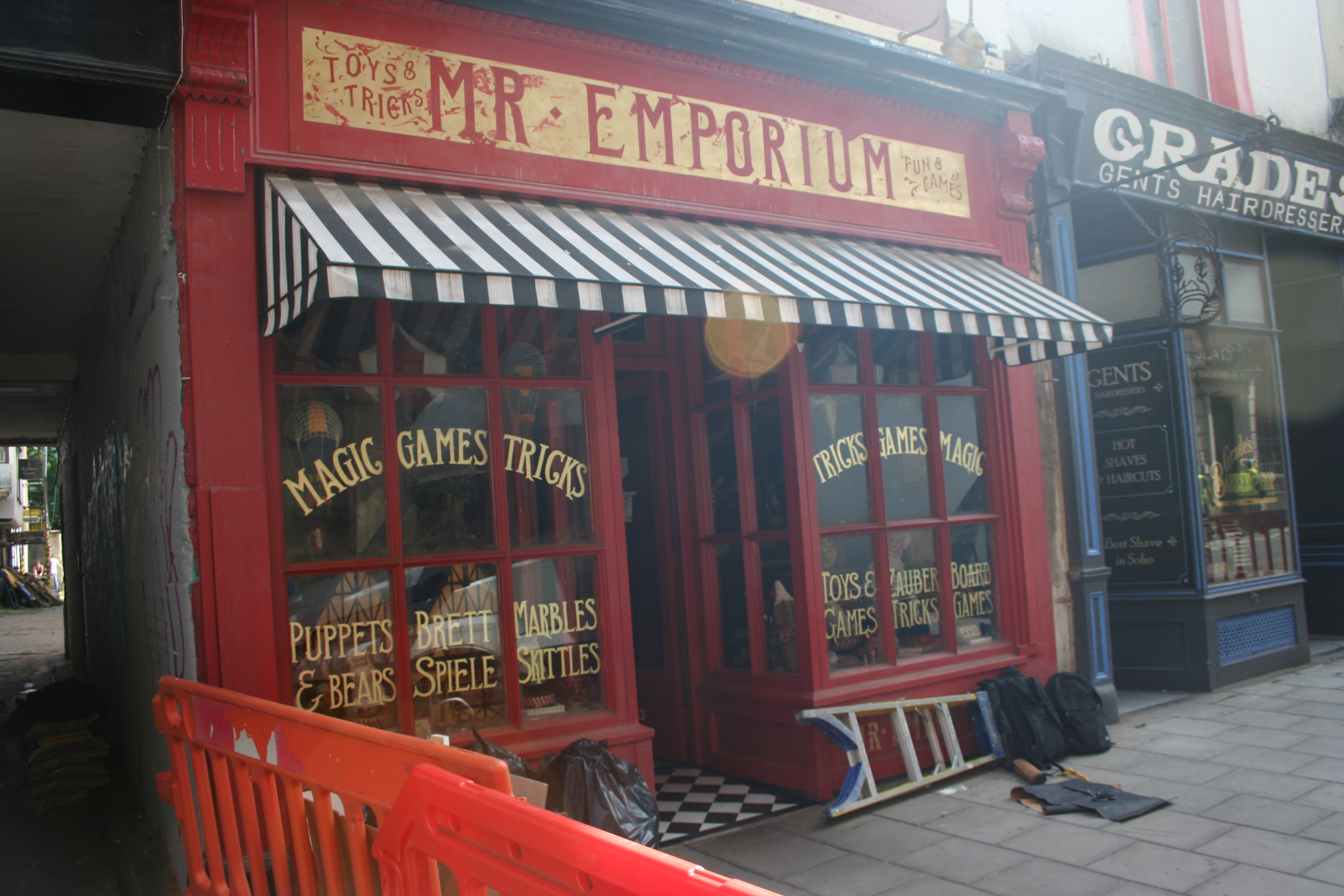
The exterior of the Toymaker's Toy shop in Bristol, as seen in "The Giggle".

"The Giggle" was subsequently filmed in June 2022. For this special, 10 different sets were built across 5 soundstages at Bad Wolf. The production team spent two days in Bristol; filming an action scene set in 2023 London, followed by period scenes set in 1925 London. A French crêperie was redressed and used as the exterior of the Toymaker's toy shop, with the interior of the toy shop built on soundstage. The UNIT helipad set was built on the studio backlot, with a blue screen surrounding half of the set. The bi-generation sequence was filmed over two days, on 21 and 22 June 2022. Producers ensured that this was a "closed set", with only 17 "essential crew" members permitted. Ncuti Gatwa was given the codename "Hilary" in call sheets and shooting schedules. A Technodolly crane was used to shoot a half-circle rotation of the two Doctors splitting. The catch sequence was completed in one day with over 70 shots. The "Spice Up Your Life" musical sequence was filmed on 28 June 2022, with around 50 shots completed in a single day. Puppeteers were present on-set to orchestrate the puppet scenes. The more time-consuming shots were filmed by a second unit. For the Toymaker's companion puppet show, Neil Patrick Harris completed some of the puppeteering himself. The variety of different locations meant that the crew were moving to a new set "almost every day". Button described the shoot as "a decathlon times ten... like the Directors' Olympics".

"Wild Blue Yonder" entered production in July 2022. This special was filmed almost entirely at Bad Wolf Studios; with the only location filming taking place at Camden Market on 16 May alongside "The Star Beast", and Dunraven Gardens in Southerndown on 26 July, doubling for Woolsthorpe Manor. The episode was considered the most complex and technically-challenging to shoot, with lots of "visual trickery". The long spaceship corridor was filmed entirely on a green screen set, with virtual environment software used to show the corridor's CGI design, which would be tracked by the crew during filming. Some of the running sequences were completed on a travelator. Tennant and Tate were scanned by a 360° full body capture rig consisting of 204 cameras to create the hyper-realistic giant hands and limbs that would be used as prosthetics by the actors during filming. Several body doubles of Tennant and Tate were required during the shoot. Physical set builds were created for the rest of the spaceship, which Davies said was "on a size I've not seen before" and praised the design team. Scenes between the Doctor and Donna and the Not-Things were rehearsed twice in a row; first with Tennant and Tate as the real Doctor and Donna, and then again with Tennant and Tate as the Not-Things. The crew filmed part of the Isaac Newton scene in the studio backlot. To prevent health and safety risks of filming in a real apple tree, the Doctor and Donna's shots were filmed separately in a small tree against blue screen.

With construction overlapping the shoot, scenes on the TARDIS across all three specials were filmed at the end of the shooting period. Filming on the set began on 25 July 2022, with scenes from "The Star Beast". Due to failing health, Cribbins's role as Wilfred Mott was reduced, however, he was able to film one last appearance for the ending of "Wild Blue Yonder", his final performance before his death on 27 July 2022. An uncredited double stood in as Wilfred for "The Giggle", which featured usage of an archival audio recording of Cribbins from "The Poison Sky" (2008). Miriam Margolyes voice-recorded dialogue for the Meep at Bang Post Production in London on 17 October 2022.

A Children in Need special was produced on 18 April 2023 and directed by Jamie Donoughue. The six-part miniseries Tales of the TARDIS was recorded over six days at Bad Wolf Studios from 25 to 30 September 2023, directed by Joshua M.G. Thomas.

The production blocks for the 2023 specials were arranged as follows:

Block	Episode	Director	Writer	Producer
1	Special 1: "The Star Beast"	Rachel Talalay	Russell T Davies	Vicki Delow
2	Special 3: "The Giggle"	Chanya Button	Russell T Davies	Vicki Delow
3	Special 2: "Wild Blue Yonder"	Tom Kingsley	Russell T Davies	Vicki Delow
X	Minisode: "Destination: Skaro"	Jamie Donoughue	Russell T Davies	Vicki Delow; Scott Handcock

=== Visual effects ===
Visual effects for "The Star Beast" were completed by Untold Studios. The VFX team contributed 330 shots for the episode, with the brief spanning "complex character work, CG environment builds and set extensions, massive battle scenes and highly complex FX sequences". In early stages, bringing the Meep to life served as a challenge for the production team, as they needed to examine all the technical aspects such as the Meep's height, fur colour, and how it should walk. Based on the comic strip drawings created by Dave Gibbons, Davies's script described the Meep as "a 2 ½ foot cream-coloured furry ferret", with "huge, soulful Puss-in-Boots eyes, two long, furry ears sleeked back, the snout extending down into a sad little mouth". Executive producer Phil Collinson said "the idea that [the Meep] would be an entirely CGI creation just didn't feel right". Ultimately, the team settled on a blend of prosthetics and CGI; a practical, animatronic costume was created by Millennium FX for the shoot, with digital effects added in post-production. Actress and martial artist Cecily Fay performed movement inside the costume, with puppeteers operating the eyes and ears. In post-production, Untold Studios delivered "both a full CG approach for some shots and an augmented 2D approach to an actor in a costume for other shots". After the Meep turns evil, Untold used "a CG digital replica of the character", which included "fully simulated muscle/fat and hair systems", allowing them to increase "the emotional range" of the Meep. This also allowed them to achieve effects such as "pupil dilation, articulated finger and toe movement". After the Meep's dialogue was recorded, the animation team used parts of Margolyes's facial performance to insert into the CG replica, to achieve the "more expressive" shots, which is harder to achieve with a practical costume.

Painting Practice, a design studio that had worked previously on His Dark Materials and Black Mirror, completed world-building and visual development on all three specials, starting with "The Star Beast"; which required "VFX asset creation, set extensions and previsualisation" of the Meep's flight deck and its escape pod, as well as the "fiery 'London Cracking' phenomenon" when the city is being destroyed. The company also helped create "graphic language" for the 3D screens animated by the Doctor's sonic screwdriver.

Prior to production of "Wild Blue Yonder", Dan May, VFX supervisor and co-founder of Painting Practice, worked with production designer Phil Sims and the special's director Tom Kingsley to "design and build the infinite Ghostship corridor scenes", using the software Unreal Engine. This was then handed to the VFX company Realtime, which developed a "digital asset" for production. This meant that using the virtual software Mo-Sys, a "physical green screen shoot" could be conducted with in-camera CGI footage, used for "on set camera tracking" and creating "instant post vis and a guide for the actor". Kingsley said that they kept "testing out different versions of big action sequences during the writing process – so we could rewrite the script to match the animatic", adding that "the concept art was to such a high standard, that the challenge was really to try and make the episode look as good as the concept art". In post-production, Realtime were tasked with creating "a corresponding high detail version" of the original asset used in the shoot for the "final background renders", removing static lighting, adjusting the textures, and animating the walls and buttresses. Nearly every shot in the episode had an element of CGI.

To achieve the establishing shots of the new UNIT tower in "The Giggle", Painting Practice used Unreal Engine to create 3D storyboarding "with a virtual camera and set planning", and used "scale models of London" using Techviz to plan the helicopter scenes, and the 360° skyline on the helipad. May researched "some classic strong tower shapes like the Shard" to model the tower on. With Davies's script describing the tower as "proud, public" and "very Stark Tower", the company wanted to "emulate the beauty and simplicity of Marvel's Stark Tower", while also ensuring they had "ownership" in their own version. Painting Practice also helped design shots for the Toymaker's puppet show and the bi-generation. In post-production, Automatik VFX were tasked with completing various effects sequences, including realising the puppets of Stooky Bill's family and Charles Banerjee, the collapsing corridor in the toy shop, and the bi-generation. Davies said that some versions of the bi-generation sequence were "too violent" and "too liquid", and others were "too thin". For inserting Stooky's face on television screens, Automatik chose to take "footage of Bill from the Frith Street set" and add a "designed, post-production filter to make it look like an early televised image, which we could then put onto all the screens on the UNIT Tower set".

=== Music ===
On 20 July 2022, Segun Akinola, who had served as composer since 2018, confirmed that he would not return for the 60th anniversary specials.

On 24 April 2023, the BBC announced that Murray Gold, the show's composer from 2005 to 2017, would be returning for the 2023 specials and the fourteenth series. The specials feature a new version of the theme tune, which was performed live by the BBC National Orchestra of Wales as part of Doctor Who @ 60: A Musical Celebration, and released officially on 12 October 2023.

Gold and the BBC National Orchestra attended their first recording session for the specials on 16 January 2023 at the Wales Millennium Centre. Gold said he did not want to include any "old recordings", and ensured that the music was "brand new, even when it's evoking an older theme".

On 15 October 2026, the BBC announced that the soundtrack for the 2023 specials would be released digitally on 23 November 2026, to coincide with the 63rd anniversary of the show's release. The soundtrack will be released as three separate albums, one for each episode of the specials, with a physical 3-disc collection to follow on 27 November.

== Release ==
=== Promotion ===
On 23 October 2022, the first teaser trailer was shown on BBC One after "The Power of the Doctor". It was confirmed that David Tennant would be playing the Fourteenth Doctor for three specials, and Ncuti Gatwa would then succeed him as the Fifteenth Doctor. It was also revealed that the specials would begin airing in November 2023. Davies teased "plenty more surprises on the way", adding that the anniversary would be "laden with mystery, horror, robots, puppets, danger and fun!". The new logo was revealed on 25 October 2022, in conjunction with the announcement that the specials would premiere on Disney+ outside the UK and Ireland. Gatwa appeared on Live with Kelly and Ryan in the United States to announce the news before the media.

On 25 December 2022, the second teaser trailer was shown on BBC One after the Strictly Come Dancing 2022 Christmas special. Davies said they wanted to deliver "a lovely little Christmas present", and promised "2023 will be a riot of Doctor Who goodness!". The trailer also offered the first glimpses of the Meep and the Wrarth Warriors.

On 7 March 2023, it was announced that Tennant, who was the main presenter of Comic Relief 2023, would appear during a sketch in the telethon in the Fourteenth Doctor's costume to promote the specials. The show began on 17 March with a sketch which saw Lenny Henry regenerate into Tennant's Fourteenth Doctor.

Spread over two weeks between April and May 2023, three cryptic teasers with reversed audio and binary codes interrupted the idents on BBC One, leading up to a third teaser trailer shown on BBC One before the Eurovision Song Contest 2023 final on 13 May, revealing each special's title. Davies teased the titles are "just the beginning of the Doctor's biggest adventure yet". On 18 July 2023, new character posters were released of the Fourteenth Doctor, Donna Noble, the Fifteenth Doctor and his companion Ruby Sunday. The Fourteenth Doctor's sonic screwdriver was then revealed on 19 July in a minute-long video; before replicas were made available to purchase online. The sonic release and posters coincided with a Doctor Who display booth at San Diego Comic-Con 2023, although an official panel did not take place.

On 23 September 2023, the full-length trailer was shown on BBC One before the first live show of Strictly Come Dancing 2023. An official poster was released, and Davies said that fans were "heading for a November full of Doctor Who surprises". On 25 October 2023, the release dates for the three specials were officially revealed, with a poster for each special released alongside. To coincide, Disney+ released their version of the trailer to promote the specials.

The press launch and screening for "The Star Beast" was held at Battersea Power Station, London on 6 November 2023, with a new poster also released. A special Doctor Who ident was launched by BBC iPlayer, with the Fourteenth Doctor questioning the return of Donna and his old face. An interactive "Choose Your Character" challenge was released on BBC iPlayer's TikTok, which revealed some unseen clips from "The Star Beast". A special mini-episode was shown during Children in Need 2023 on 17 November. Tennant and Davies embarked on a media round in the week leading up to "The Star Beast", and preview clips were released during the week leading up to each special.

To mark the day of the 60th anniversary on 23 November 2023, a water-based projection was launched during after-dark hours on Cardiff Bay, which displayed several iconic villains and characters from across the show's 60-year history. On 24 November, Tennant appeared as the Fourteenth Doctor on CBeebies Bedtime Story to read "The Way Back Home" by Oliver Jeffers. The Fourteenth Doctor and Donna featured on the front cover of Radio Times magazine for 25 November–1 December 2023, as part of a special celebratory issue for the 60th anniversary and the launch of the specials.

=== Broadcast ===
The three specials began airing on 25 November 2023 and concluded on 9 December 2023, marking Doctor Who's 60th anniversary. The specials were the first Doctor Who episodes to premiere internationally on Disney+; like previous episodes, they were aired on BBC One and BBC iPlayer in the United Kingdom. The streaming partnership between the BBC and Disney Branded Television was announced in October 2022, with Davies adding that the aim is to "launch the TARDIS all around the planet, reaching a new generation of fans while keeping our traditional home firmly on the BBC in the UK".

The second special, "Wild Blue Yonder", ended with a dedication to Bernard Cribbins, who died in July 2022 and made his final television appearance as Wilfred Mott.

On 2 February 2024, amidst Doctor Who's unavailability on Disney+ and the inaccessibility of BBC iPlayer in Ireland, the 2023 specials and "The Church on Ruby Road" marked the inaugural episodes to be added to the RTÉ Player platform in Ireland. It is anticipated that all subsequent episodes, starting with the following series, will be released on the RTÉ Player.

=== 60th anniversary ===
==== Television re-releases ====
Ahead of the anniversary, the BBC cleared the rights to allow more than 800 episodes of Doctor Who programming — including episodes from the classic and revival series, Torchwood, The Sarah Jane Adventures, Class, and Doctor Who Confidential — as part of its iPlayer offering from 1 November 2023. Episodes included new accessibility options, including subtitles, audio description, and sign language. The release of these episodes excluded the first Doctor Who serial, An Unearthly Child (1963), due to a lack of agreement between the BBC and the son of the serial's late writer Anthony Coburn. The BBC used "Whoniverse" as the collective name for all the programmes.

A marathon of the fourth series, which starred Tennant and Tate, occurred on 4 November. On 23 November, BBC Four broadcast a 75-minute colourised version of The Daleks (1963), featuring new sound design and a score by Mark Ayres. This was followed by a repeat of An Adventure in Space and Time (2013), with the ending of the film now featuring Gatwa, replacing Matt Smith. An Adventure in Space and Time was modified further for its re-airing, with dialogue from An Unearthly Child being cut from the original production, due to the same lack of agreement that prevented An Unearthly Child from being part of the Whoniverse programming release on iPlayer. A fully-animated release of The Celestial Toymaker, utilising the original soundtrack recordings, was released on DVD and Blu-ray.

==== Tales of the TARDIS ====
The first Whoniverse original series, Tales of the TARDIS, was released on BBC iPlayer on 1 November 2023, coinciding with the Whoniverse's launch. The six-part series featured omnibus versions of classic Doctor Who stories bookended with new scenes featuring classic era Doctors and companions remembering the adventure.

==== Children in Need ====
A special five-minute minisode titled "Destination: Skaro" was broadcast during the 2023 Children in Need telethon on 17 November 2023. It starred Tennant as the Fourteenth Doctor, alongside Mawaan Rizwan as Mr Castavillian and featured the return of Davros (Julian Bleach) and the very first Dalek.

==== Liberation of the Daleks ====
Doctor Who Magazine produced a 14-part comic strip adventure, titled Liberation of the Daleks, which was designed to bridge the gap between "The Power of the Doctor" and "The Star Beast". The story was canonically branded as the Fourteenth Doctor's first official adventure, exclusive to Doctor Who Magazine. The story ran from 10 November 2022 (issue 584) to 9 November 2023 (issue 597).

==== Documentaries ====
Three TV documentaries were announced as part of the anniversary celebrations. The first, Talking Doctor Who, presented by Tennant, showcases the history of the classic era. It was broadcast on 1 November 2023 on BBC Four. The second, Doctor Who: 60 Years of Secrets and Scandals, uncovers a host of behind-the-scenes stories from the show's classic run. It was broadcast on 25 November 2023 on Channel 5. The third, Russell T Davies: The Doctor and Me, details Davies's return as showrunner. It was broadcast on 18 December 2023 on BBC One.

==== Radio and audio ====
On 23 November 2022, Big Finish Productions announced a 60th anniversary special audio drama featuring the Fourth to Tenth Doctors entitled Once and Future, which was released monthly between May and October 2023, with an additional release in November 2024.

BBC Radio and BBC Sounds broadcast a number of special programmes in late 2023 to commemorate the show; the first being Doctor Who @ 60: A Musical Celebration on BBC Radio 2, a special pre-recorded concert in October that featured music from across the show's modern era, including the first exclusive performance of the 2023 theme tune. The concert also featured guest appearances from Davies and former showrunners Steven Moffat and Chris Chibnall. A two-part documentary titled Who Are We: Doctor Who? was broadcast on BBC Radio 2 on 21 and 22 October. Spanning the anniversary period, BBC Radio 2 broadcast a series of My Life in a Mixtape episodes with several former and current Doctor Who cast members, including Peter Davison, Nicholas Briggs, Sylvester McCoy, Bonnie Langford, Janet Fielding, Sophie Aldred and Ruth Madeley, as well as former composer Segun Akinola. A 30-minute documentary titled Doctor Who: The Wilderness Years was broadcast on 19 November on BBC Radio 4. Two specials aired on BBC Radio Wales on 23 November; a documentary exploring the show's relationship with Wales in Doctor Who: The Welsh Connection, and Huw Stephens presenting a tribute to the music of Doctor Who in Doctor Huw. Gold presented an hour-long programme titled Murray Gold: Hitting the Right Notes on 23 November on BBC Radio Solent.

==== Multiplatform story ====
On 20 March 2023, a multiplatform story titled Doom's Day was announced, starring Sooz Kempner as Doom, the "universe's greatest assassin". The event launched in June 2023 via productions through Doctor Who's digital channels, Penguin Random House, Doctor Who Magazine, Titan Comics, Big Finish Productions, BBC Audio, and East Side Games, and concluded in October 2023.

=== Aftershow ===
The 60th anniversary specials were accompanied by the launch of Doctor Who: Unleashed, a behind-the-scenes companion show on BBC Three. Adopting a similar format to Doctor Who Confidential, Unleashed follows every new episode of Doctor Who with a 30-minute instalment on BBC Three, hosted by Newsbeat presenter Steffan Powell. The show was announced on 27 September 2023, after accurate reports of the show surfaced the previous year.

A 15-minute opening episode was released on BBC iPlayer, with an excerpt airing during Children in Need 2023 on 17 November, covering the making of the Children in Need special.

=== Home media ===
Series	Story no.	Episode name	Duration	Release date		
Series	Story no.	Episode name	Duration	R2	R4	R1
2023 specials	301–303	Doctor Who: 60th Anniversary Specials	3 × 60 min.	18 December 2023^{(D,B)}	18 December 2024 ^{(D)} 22 January 2025 ^{(B)}	10 December 2024^{(D,B)}
Anniversary re-releases	2	The Daleks in Colour	1 × 75 min. 7 × 25 min.	12 February 2024 ^{(D,B)}	4 September 2024 ^{(D,B)}	19 March 2024 ^{(D,B)}
Anniversary re-releases	24	The Celestial Toymaker (Note: All four episodes animated (colour and black-and-white versions), remastered Episode 4 and 'tele-snap' reconstructions)	4 × 25 min.	10 June 2024 ^{(D,B)}	4 September 2024 ^{(D,B)}	11 June 2024 ^{(B)}

== In print ==
Jacqueline King, Bonnie Langford and Dan Starkey, who portray Sylvia Noble, Mel Bush and Strax (from previous series) respectively, narrated each of the specials' respective audiobooks.

Series	Story no.	Novelisation title	Author	eBook release date (Note: Published by BBC Books under the Target Collection umbrella unless otherwise indicated)	Hardcover release date	Paperback release date	Audiobook	
Series	Story no.	Novelisation title	Author	eBook release date	Hardcover release date	Paperback release date	Release date (Note: Unabridged from BBC Audio / AudioGo unless otherwise indicated)	Narrator
2023 specials	—N/a	"Destination: Skaro"	Steve Cole	19 September 2024 (Note: Published by BBC Children's Books as part of Fleeting Faces in Fifteen Doctors 15 Stories)	5 September 2024 (Note: Published by BBC Children's Books as part of The Official Annual 2025)	19 September 2024		Jacob Dudman
2023 specials	301	The Star Beast	Gary Russell	30 November 2023	—N/a	11 January 2024	1 February 2024	Jacqueline King
2023 specials	302	Wild Blue Yonder	Mark Morris	7 December 2023	—N/a	11 January 2024	1 February 2024	Bonnie Langford
2023 specials	303	The Giggle	James Goss	14 December 2023	—N/a	11 January 2024	1 February 2024	Dan Starkey

== Reception ==
=== Ratings ===
No.	Title	Air date	Overnight ratings		Consolidated ratings		Total viewers (millions)	28-day viewers (millions)	AI	Ref(s)
No.	Title	Air date	Viewers (millions)	Rank	Viewers (millions)	Rank	Total viewers (millions)	28-day viewers (millions)	AI	Ref(s)
1	"The Star Beast"	25 November 2023	5.08	2	2.53	10	7.61	8.36	84	
2	"Wild Blue Yonder"	2 December 2023	4.83	3	2.31	9	7.14	8.30	83	
3	"The Giggle"	9 December 2023	4.62	3	2.23	10	6.85	7.91	85	

=== Critical reception ===
Doctor Who specials: Critical reception by episode
Specials (2023): Percentage of positive critics' reviews tracked by the website Rotten Tomatoes

On Rotten Tomatoes, a review aggregator website, 96% of 57 critics gave the specials a positive review. The three specials respectively received positive reviews of 91%, 100%, and 100%.

The three specials overall received positive reviews from critics. Ryan Woodrow from Men's Journal described the specials as having revitalised the show, including fan-favourite elements from its later 2000s era while also pushing its narrative forward. Woodrow stated that the first special lived to the expectations of the past year, while complimenting Davies's inclusion of LGBTQ+ elements, but was also critical of the handling of the "meta-crisis" storyline. He described the second special as a "spot-on balance between humor and drama" while comparing the episode to other highly-rated episodes like "Midnight" (2008) and "Heaven Sent" (2015), and the third special as the "most action-packed and exciting of the three" while also having issues with the concept of bi-generation. Overall, Woodrow believed that the specials successfully rekindled the love for Doctor Who after a divisive era.

Emirhan Çakmak of Daily Sabah praised the chemistry between Tennant's and Tate's characters, describing the specials as "emotional". He described "Wild Blue Yonder" as initially slow but eventually raising the level of excitement and intensity, and described Harris's character of the Toymaker as "one of the most iconic villains from the classic series". Çakmak commented on the character's German accent as being "redundant" and would have preferred if all three specials had focused on the Toymaker. In general, he summarised the three specials as "both rewarding and unsatisfying", though a "pleasure" at the same time.

=== Awards and nominations ===
Year	Award	Category	Nominee(s)	Result	Ref.
2024	BAFTA TV Awards	P&O Cruises Memorable Moment Award	"Ncuti Gatwa being revealed as the 15th Doctor" for "The Giggle"	Nominated	
2024	BAFTA TV Awards	Titles and Graphic Identity	Dan May, James Coore, Painting Practice, Realtime Visualisation for "Wild Blue Yonder"	Nominated	
2024	Hugo Awards	Best Dramatic Presentation, Short Form	"Wild Blue Yonder"	Nominated	
2024	Hugo Awards	Best Dramatic Presentation, Short Form	"The Giggle"	Nominated	

== Soundtrack ==
Doctor Who: The 60th Anniversary Specials

Soundtrack album by Murray Gold
- Released: 23 November 2026 (digital); 27 November 2026 (CD)
- Genre: Soundtrack
- Label: Silva Screen

Doctor Who soundtrack chronology
Doctor Who: Timelash (2026)	Doctor Who: The 60th Anniversary Specials (2026)

In June 2025, composer Murray Gold commented on the release of the related soundtrack, and that there would likely be "one big music dump" for the soundtracks of the tenth series, 2023 specials, fourteenth series and fifteenth series.

In February 2026, Gold appeared on The Whoniverse Show to discuss the soundtracks for the 2023 specials and following two series, stating that the release window would "be 2026 I think. Hopefully all three."

Music from these specials by Murray Gold will be released as three separate digital albums on 23 November 2026 and as a 3-CD set on 27 November 2026.

==== Track listing ====
All tracks are written by Murray Gold, except where noted

Disc 1 – "The Star Beast"
No.	Title	Length
1.	"Once Upon a Time Lord"
2.	"Doctor Who Theme (60th Anniversary Specials)" (Ron Grainer, arr. Murray Gold)
3.	"Strolling in the City"
4.	"Spaceship in Trouble"
5.	"Hitching a Ride"
6.	"Crash Site"
7.	"Aliens Everywhere"
8.	"Solar Psychedelia"
9.	"Dangerous Memories"
10.	"A Meep in My Shed"
11.	"Here We Go Again"
12.	"Invasion Calling"
13.	"Wrarth and Disorder"
14.	"Silence in Court"
15.	"To Hell with This"
16.	"A Vessel to the Stars"
17.	"Impending Launch"
18.	"Countdown to Catastrophe"
19.	"Why Does It Have to Be This?"
20.	"Donna is Descending"
21.	"Binary Awakening"
22.	"Just Like the Old Days"
23.	"We Are Back (Trailer)"

Disc 2 – "Wild Blue Yonder"
No.	Title	Length
1.	"The TARDIS Doesn’t Fall Far from the Tree"
2.	"The Mavity of the Situation"
3.	"Time to Rebuild"
4.	"I Will Get You Home"
5.	"Hostile Action"
6.	"Circuits Moving"
7.	"A Very Long Corridor"
8.	"The Edge of the Universe"
9.	"No Signs of Life"
10.	"The Only Thing I’ve Got"
11.	"My Arms Are Too Long"
12.	"All or No-Thing"
13.	"Memories and Mass"
14.	"Doppelgänger Dilemma"
15.	"I Saw Your Mind"
16.	"Imposters"
17.	"A Pinch of Protection"
18.	"A Ship Full of Questions"
19.	"They Need the Answers"
20.	"Very Slow Countdown"
21.	"When Time Runs Out"
22.	"The Wrong Donna"
23.	"The Devil’s in the Details"

Disc 3 – "The Giggle"
No.	Title	Length
1.	"What a Wonderful Game"
2.	"Streets of Anarchy"
3.	"UNIT Tower"
4.	"Everyone’s Going Mad"
5.	"Zeedex Deactivated"
6.	"Decoding the Signal"
7.	"Laughing at the Human Race"
8.	"The Puppeteer"
9.	"UNIT Negotiations"
10.	"Hide and Seek"
11.	"What Am I Now?"
12.	"The Celestial Toyroom"
13.	"Donna and the Dolls"
14.	"Toymaker’s Theatre"
15.	"Rules of the Game"
16.	"Battleground Declared"
17.	"The Time Lord and the Toymaker"
18.	"Bi-Generation"
19.	"Catch Me If You Can"
20.	"The One Adventure You’ve Never Had"
21.	"Next Stop, Everywhere"
22.	"Never Been Happier"
23.	"Doctor Who Theme (End Credits) (60th Anniversary Specials)" (Ron Grainer, arr. Murray Gold)
