= Wild Blue Yonder (Doctor Who) =

302 – "Wild Blue Yonder"
- Doctor Who episode
- Promotional poster

Cast
- Doctor: David Tennant – Fourteenth Doctor
- Companion: Catherine Tate – Donna Noble
- Others: Bernard Cribbins – Wilfred Mott; Nathaniel Curtis – Isaac Newton; Susan Twist – Mrs. Merridew; Daniel Tuite – The Doctor acting double; Ophir Raray – The Doctor beast double; Tommaso Di Vincenzo – The Doctor contortionist double; Helen Cripps – Donna acting double

Production
- Directed by: Tom Kingsley
- Written by: Russell T Davies
- Produced by: Vicki Delow
- Executive producers: Russell T Davies; Julie Gardner; Jane Tranter; Joel Collins; Phil Collinson
- Music by: Murray Gold
- Series: 2023 specials
- Running time: 54 minutes
- First broadcast: 2 December 2023

Chronology
← Preceded by "The Star Beast"	Followed by → "The Giggle"

"Wild Blue Yonder" is the second of the 60th anniversary specials of the British science fiction television programme Doctor Who. It was first broadcast on BBC One on 2 December 2023, and was written by Russell T Davies and directed by Tom Kingsley. David Tennant stars as the Fourteenth Doctor, alongside Catherine Tate as Donna Noble.

Set directly after the events of "The Star Beast", the episode focuses on the Doctor and Donna being stranded by the TARDIS on an abandoned spaceship at the edge of the universe, where they encounter a pair of sadistic, shapeshifting duplicates of themselves. It is dedicated to Bernard Cribbins, who posthumously appears as Wilfred Mott, who filmed his scene shortly before his death in July 2022.

The episode was watched by 7.14 million viewers and received positive reviews from critics, with praise being directed toward the performances of Tennant and Tate. A novelisation of the episode was written by Mark Morris, which was then turned into an audiobook read by former companion actress Bonnie Langford.

== Plot ==
The TARDIS lands in Isaac Newton's apple tree in 1666. As the Doctor and Donna depart, they accidentally cause Newton to name gravity "mavity".

Malfunctioning, the TARDIS lands on a spaceship at the edge of the universe. As the pair explore a vast corridor, the TARDIS vanishes. The Doctor and Donna find an old robot walking very slowly down the corridor. There are no signs of life anywhere on the ship and periodically they hear single-word, unintelligible announcements accompanied by the ship reconfiguring itself.

A short clip from the episode in a 9:16 aspect ratio, depicting the Doctor's escape from the ship as he takes the wrong Donna.

The Doctor and Donna split up and encounter doppelgängers of each other. Calling themselves 'Not-Things', they lack the concept of size and shape, and cannot avoid deforming. Briefly reuniting, the Doctor and Donna realise the Not-Things are taking on their thoughts as well as their form. A reconfiguration of the ship splits the pair up again, and when they both apparently re-encounter one another, they struggle to tell if the other is a Not-Thing. All four meet and the real Doctor and Donna identify each other. The Doctor tries to use superstition to trick the Not-Things by saying they have to stay behind a line of salt.

The Doctor realises the ship's captain killed herself to stop the Not-Things copying them and taking control of the ship, and also set in motion a trap. The Not-Things realise the trap is a very slow self-destruct sequence intended to kill them, and that the robot is the trigger. The announcements are a countdown to that self-destruction. The Doctor speeds up the countdown as the Not-Things race to stop the robot. The TARDIS returns just before the ship explodes, and the Doctor mistakenly takes Donna's doppelgänger instead of Donna. However, he soon realises and rescues the real Donna just as the ship explodes. The Doctor mentions regretting that he invoked a superstition at the edge of the universe with the salt.

The pair return to Camden Market, two days after they originally left, and are greeted by Wilfred Mott, who is overjoyed to see them. As he tells the Doctor he knew he would come back and save everyone, a riot starts and a plane crashes.

== Production ==
=== Development ===
Plot and cast details were deliberately kept secret in the build-up to the episode, leading to speculation it would feature cameo appearances of previous incarnations of the Doctor, with Davies later saying that he had conflicting plans for the episode and originally considered including an appearance by the First Doctor and a robot-filled cellar. Before the episode was broadcast, director Tom Kingsley made a statement attempting to calm speculation, and afterwards Davies explained that the secrecy was because it was "the simplest of the lot", as he had scrapped all other concepts in order to focus on the core premise of Tennant and Tate's characters being alone with the Not-Things on the spaceship. Some critics described "Wild Blue Yonder" as a bottle episode because it used limited sets and had a small cast.

The episode primarily uses VFX and computer-generated imagery to create the appearance of the spaceship's interior; Davies stated that this was inspired by the 1978 serial Underworld, which also used special VFX techniques to portray the episode's setting. The episode references The Timeless Child and the Flux from his predecessor Chris Chibnall's era of the show, with the Not-Things taunting the Doctor about events that happened during these episodes. In one scene, the Doctor invokes a superstition by laying a line of salt to halt the Not-Things. In the following episode, "The Giggle", this is revealed to be the cause of the appearance of the Toymaker, and has larger repercussions in the following season.

The VFX and Art teams collaborated on design for the sets, primarily the main hallway. Pre-visualisations were made in order to create references for scene outlines. The design of the ship used in concept art for the episode remained consistent throughout production, with Davies describing the goal as aiming for an "ideal" with the design. 3D models were taken of Tennant and Tate and were used by the VFX and props teams to create the Not-Things's body abnormalities. Tennant and Tate used physical props to simulate the inhuman aspects of the Not-Things, such as plastic teeth and an oversized controllable arm. A prosthetic leg with extra knees was created for Tate, and a prosthetic face was used to double for Tennant. Production designer Phil Sims and graphic designer Stephen Fielding created a language of glyphs to decorate the ship. These glyphs were inspired by horse hooves, with Sims citing the pilot of the ship's equine appearance for this.

The old robot, nicknamed "Jimbo", was constructed as a puppet in order to make sure the design did not appear human. An aluminium frame was constructed from scratch, and 3D printing and fibreglass moulds were used. The final prop was controlled by a team of five puppeteers, who controlled the joints individually.

=== Casting ===
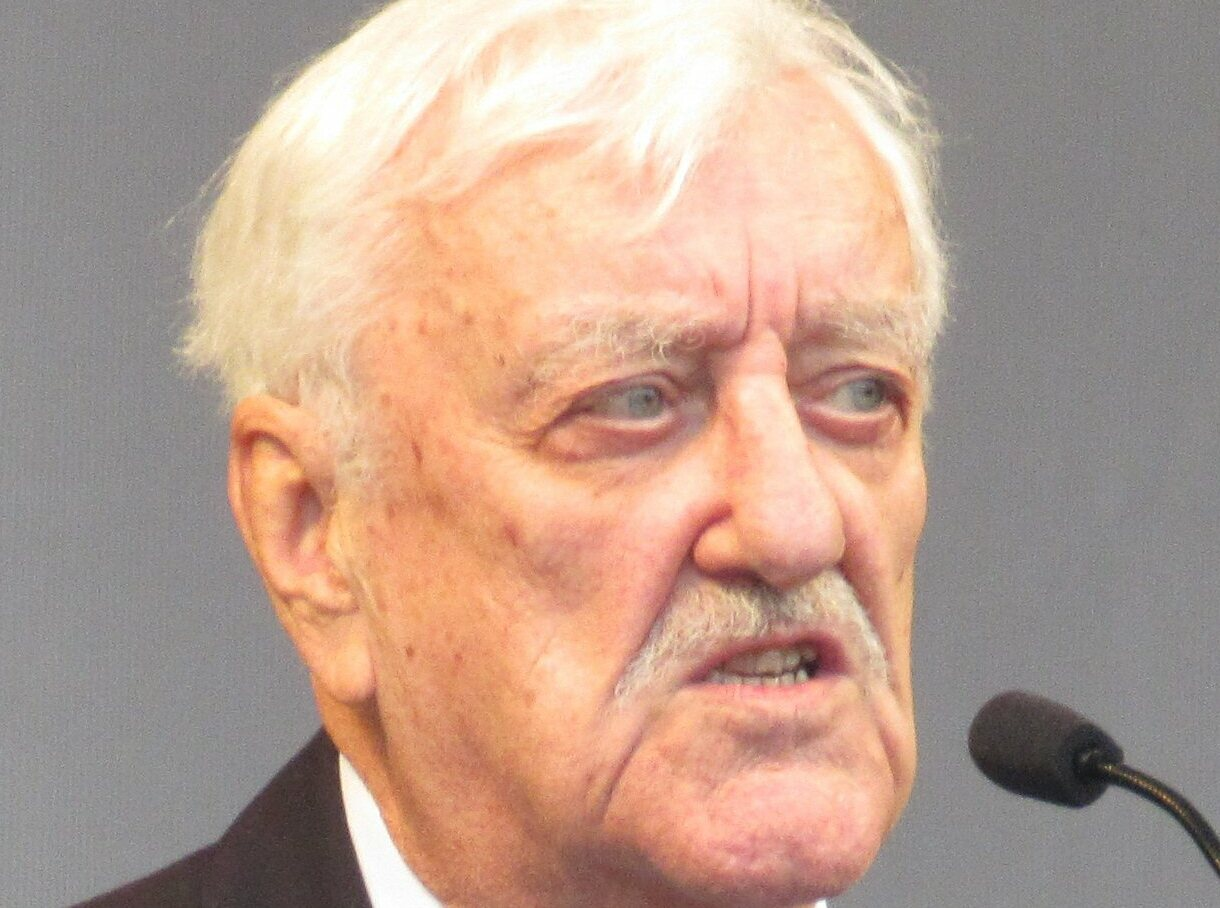
The episode was dedicated to Bernard Cribbins, who died shortly after filming his scene in the episode.

David Tennant and Catherine Tate both returned to the series as part of the 60th anniversary specials. Tennant stars as the Fourteenth Doctor while Tate reprises her role as Donna Noble. Additionally, Nathaniel Curtis appears as Isaac Newton. This episode also marked the first appearance of Susan Twist, who would reappear in other roles throughout the subsequent series. George Cheetham acted as a stunt double for David Tennant, with floor runner Helen Langford standing in for Catherine Tate. Additional doubles included Daniel Tuite, Ophir Raray, and Tommaso de Vincenzo for Tennant, and Helen Cripps for Tate. Contortionist Tommaso Di Vincenzo portrayed the Not-Thing mimicking the Doctor in a scene where the creature bent double backwards.

The episode marked the final appearance of Bernard Cribbins as Wilfred Mott. Cribbins died in July 2022, and the episode is dedicated to him. Davies had wanted Cribbins to appear in more scenes in the anniversary specials, but due to Cribbins' health he was only able to record one.

=== Filming ===
The episode was directed by Tom Kingsley. The episode was filmed in July 2022, during a heat wave. Filming was done entirely on set, with large amounts of green screens and VFX work done to show the pair being on board the spaceship. When the Not-Things were in the same scene with Tennant and Tate, stunt doubles stood in opposite the actors, and Tennant and Tate would run through the scene as the "good" pair and the "bad" pair.

The scene featuring Isaac Newton was filmed in Dunraven Gardens in Wales. The scene where the Doctor and Donna crash land into a tree was filmed a few days later at Wolf Studios. Due to concerns of actor safety, the scene was filmed on the ground, and then composited into the shot in editing. For the London plane crash scene, a smoke cannon was used to simulate the appearance of air being propelled from a long distance away. The SFX team researched plane landings and explosion effects in order to make the plane crash look realistic.

The final mix for the episode was on 23 August 2023.

== Broadcast and reception ==
Professional ratings
Aggregate scores
Source	Rating
Rotten Tomatoes (Tomatometer)	100%
Review scores
Source	Rating
Empire	5/5 stars
The Guardian	4/5 stars
The Daily Telegraph	5/5 stars
The i	5/5 stars

=== Broadcast ===
"Wild Blue Yonder" was broadcast on 2 December 2023 as the second of the three 2023 specials, filmed for the 60th anniversary of Doctor Who. The episode initially aired on BBC One, and was later released on BBC iPlayer. It was released worldwide via Disney+.

=== Ratings ===
"Wild Blue Yonder" was watched by 4.83 million viewers overnight. It was the third-most watched programme of the night. The consolidated ratings gave a figure of 7.14 million viewers, ranking the episode as the ninth most watched programme of the week, beaten only by that week's episodes of I'm a Celebrity...Get Me Out of Here! and Strictly Come Dancing.

The episode was the second highest viewed of the three specials.

=== Critical reception ===
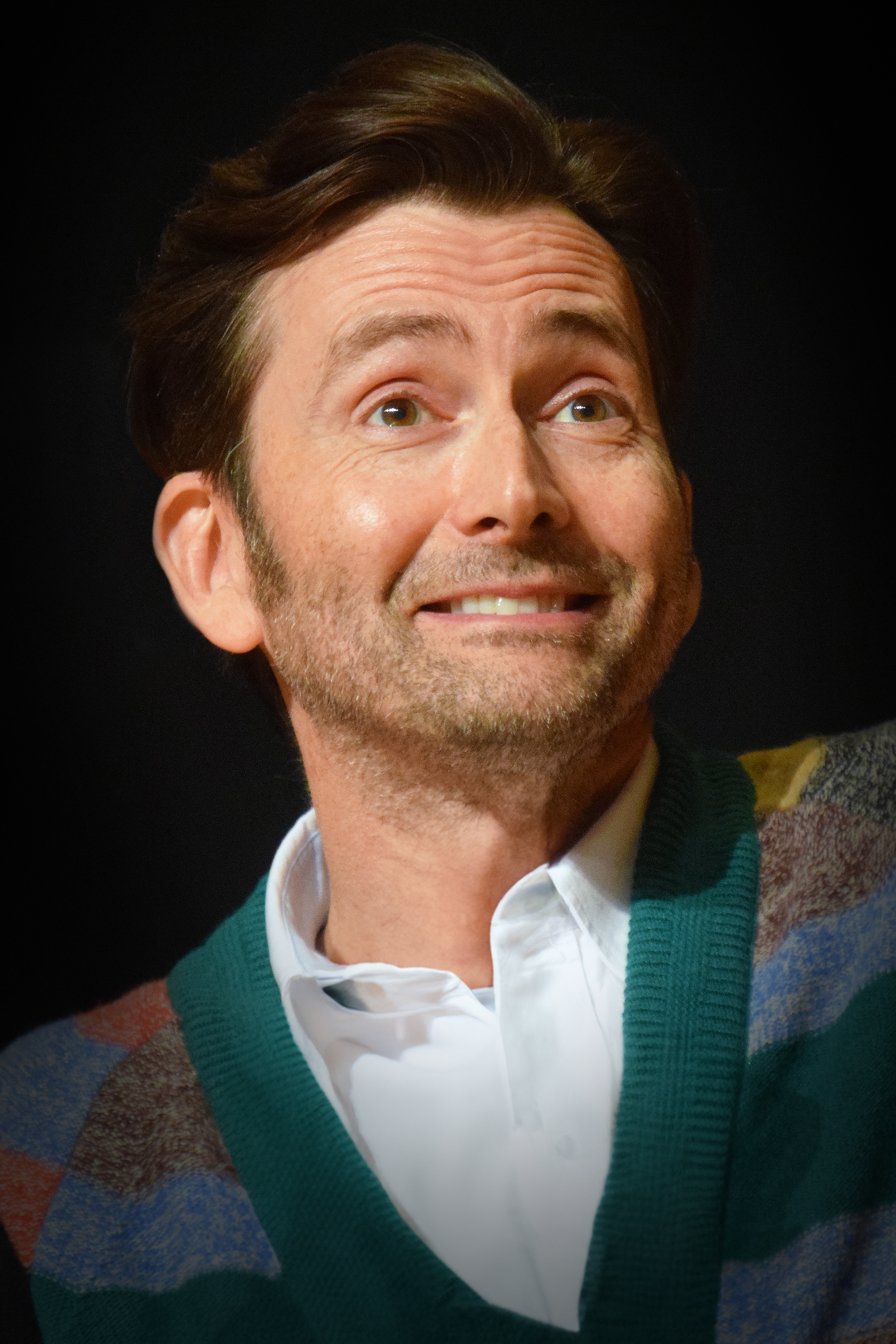
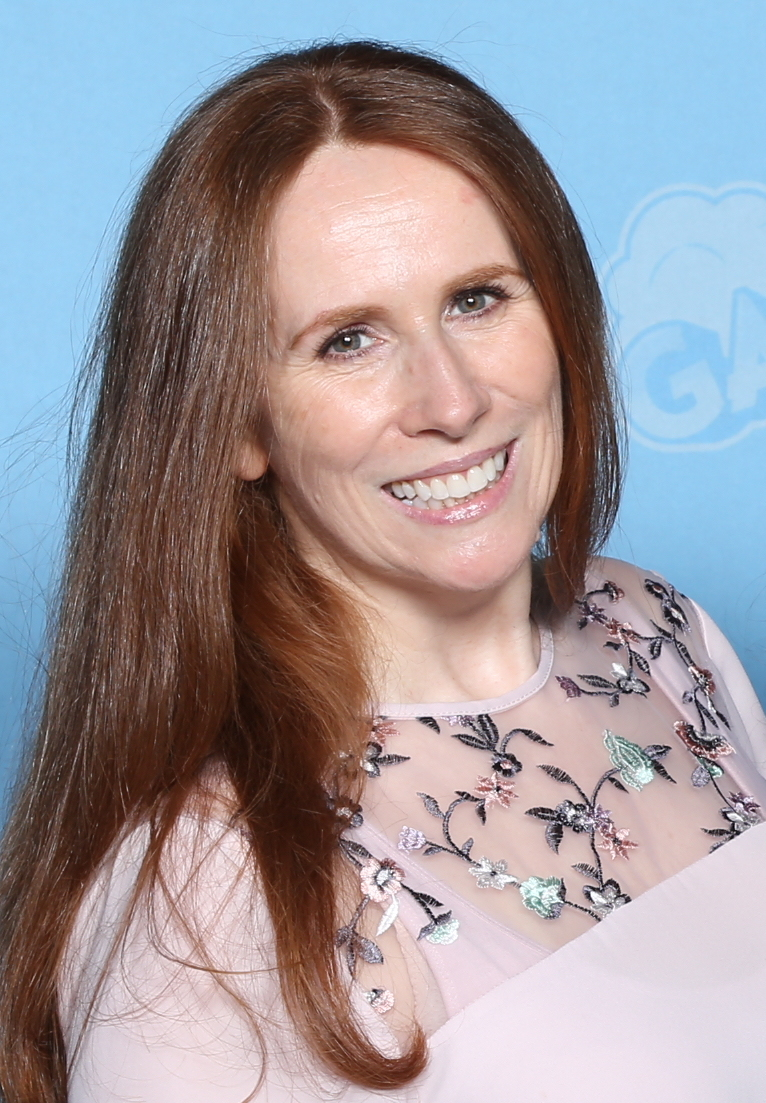
David Tennant and Catherine Tate were praised for their performances in the episode.

The special received positive reviews. On the review aggregate site Rotten Tomatoes, 100% of 16 critics gave "Wild Blue Yonder" a positive review, with an average rating of 9.09/10. The site's consensus reads "'Wild Blue Yonder' gets real weird with the formula, and yet it hits home as classic Doctor Who with its heartfelt attention paid to the characters."

The Guardian's Martin Belam rated the special a 4/5, describing the acting as "impeccable" and further praising the visual effects. Patrick Mulkern of Radio Times responded positively to the episode, highlighting the performances of Tennant and Tate, the episode's visuals, and the cameo appearance of Cribbins. Richard Edwards of Total Film praised the episode, highlighting the performances of Tennant and Tate, as well as Davies's writing.

Chris Allcock of Den of Geek responded positively to the episode, highlighting the episode's ending act, but criticized the episode's middle act for how the Not-Things were uncovered and revealed by the Doctor and Donna, as well as some of the CGI effects used for the Not-Things. Samantha Coley of Collider praised the performances of Tennant and Tate, highlighting the horror elements and character work done in the episode, though similarly felt the CGI for the Not-Things might initially come off as "somewhat silly".

== Home media ==
Wild Blue Yonder
- Author: Mark Morris
- Series: Doctor Who book: Target novelisations
- Publisher: BBC Books
- Publication date: 7 December 2023 (eBook); 11 January 2024 (paperback); 1 February 2024 (audiobook)
- Pages: 176
- ISBN: 9781785948466

"Wild Blue Yonder", along with the other two specials "The Star Beast" and "The Giggle", were released on home media on 18 December 2023.

=== In print ===
A novelisation of the episode, written by Mark Morris, was released as an eBook on 7 December 2023. Followed by a paperback edition on 11 January 2024 as part of the Target Collection and then an audiobook read by Bonnie Langford on 1 February 2024.
