= Wilfred Mott =

Fictional character from Doctor Who

- Doctor Who character
- Wilfred Mott in "Voyage of the Damned"
- First appearance: "Voyage of the Damned" (2007)
- Last appearance: "The Giggle" (2023)
- Created by: Russell T Davies
- Portrayed by: Bernard Cribbins
- Duration: 2007–2010, 2023

In-universe information
- Species: Human
- Occupation: Army veteran Amateur astronomer
- Affiliation: Tenth Doctor; Fourteenth Doctor; Donna Noble
- Children: Sylvia Noble (daughter)
- Origin: Chiswick, London, England
- Home era: Early 21st century

Wilfred "Wilf" Mott is a recurring fictional character in the British science fiction television series Doctor Who, played by Bernard Cribbins. He is the grandfather of the Tenth Doctor's companion Donna Noble, and father of her mother, Sylvia Noble. As companion to the Doctor, an alien Time Lord from the planet Gallifrey, Donna travelled through space and time in the show's 2008 series, having numerous adventures. A believer in extraterrestrial life himself, Wilfred was proud of his granddaughter's adventures and helped to keep them a secret from her overbearing mother. He later became the Tenth Doctor's final companion in "The End of Time".

Cribbins was originally intended to appear only in the 2007 Christmas special, "Voyage of the Damned", but when Howard Attfield was forced to retire from his role as Donna's father, Geoff Noble, due to illness (Attfield subsequently died), creator Russell T Davies reconceived Cribbins' role as Donna's grandfather and replaced Attfield with him for the fourth series. In May 2022, Cribbins was reportedly due to reprise the role for the series' 60th anniversary specials in 2023, having been spotted on the set of the specials. "Wild Blue Yonder", the special episode Cribbins appears in, marked his final acting role before his death on 27 July 2022; the episode is dedicated to his memory. Wilfred briefly appears in "The Giggle", portrayed by an uncredited stand-in and featuring usage of an archival audio recording of Cribbins from the 2008 episode "The Poison Sky".

== Character history ==
Wilfred Mott first appears in "Voyage of the Damned" (2007). A British Army veteran, he mans a newspaper stand and is one of the few people to remain in a deserted London over Christmas following the bizarre events during Christmas in recent years. (Note: (as seen in "The Christmas Invasion" and "The Runaway Bride")) He is a staunch monarchist and wears the badge of the Parachute Regiment on his beanie, Cribbins himself wore the same badge during his National Service. The Doctor and Astrid Peth meet him shortly after teleporting down to Earth, before witnessing them disappearing back to the intergalactic cruiser Titanic.

In the episode "Partners in Crime", Wilfred is revealed to be an amateur astronomer who spends his evenings stargazing with his telescope from an allotment. He has an interest in alien conspiracies and is somewhat eccentric in his beliefs. He has a good relationship with his granddaughter, Donna Noble (who calls him "gramps"), morally supporting her in contrast to Sylvia's berating and nagging, and he is joined by Donna on the allotment when she wishes to escape this. After Donna sets off with the Doctor, they make a fly-by of the allotment in the TARDIS, its door open, astonishing Wilfred. Donna waves to him from the TARDIS door and he is jubilant to see that she is following her desire for adventure.

In "The Sontaran Strategem", Wilfred is reunited with his granddaughter and the Doctor, whom Donna is shocked to learn he has met previously. His absence in "The Runaway Bride" is explained by being ill with what he believed to be Spanish flu. When the ATMOS devices activate, he is trapped in the family car where the Doctor and Donna try to rescue him. In "The Poison Sky", Sylvia saves him by smashing the windscreen with an axe kept by the front door of her house. Despite seeing first-hand the risks of travelling with the Doctor, he nevertheless continues to support Donna in doing so.

In a parallel world in "Turn Left", in which the Doctor died without ever meeting Donna, Donna wins a holiday for her family in the country, Wilfred is thus not at his news stand at Christmas as otherwise depicted in "Voyage of the Damned". Without the Doctor, the interstellar cruiser Titanic crashes into Central London, obliterating the metropolis in a massive nuclear explosion. Following the disaster, the United States pledges much-needed aid to the collapsing United Kingdom; Wilfred, trying to remain optimistic, remarks "God bless America!", though the anticipated aid is cancelled after millions in the U.S. are killed as a result of Miss Foster's selection of the U.S. as a breeding ground for the Adipose. Wilfred and his family are evacuated to Leeds with countless other refugees. They share an apartment with an Italian immigrant family, initially annoying the Nobles, but the two families quickly befriend. This friendship is short lived, however, as Wilfred becomes distraught when Rocco and his family are moved from Leeds to a labour camp when a new far-right government places Britain under martial law; he notes "that's what they called them last time," alluding to Nazi concentration camps during World War II. A reference to Wilfred's military service is made in this episode, his friend Rocco calls him "my capitano" and salutes him solemnly as he is taken away.

In "The Stolen Earth", Wilfred takes it upon himself to fight the Daleks. Armed with a paintball gun, he reasons that shooting them in their eyepiece will blind them, however upon doing so the Dalek effortlessly dissolves the paint. He and Sylvia are rescued from the Dalek by Rose Tyler, who destroys it and returns with them to their home to try to contact the Doctor. Due to Wilfred not owning a webcam, his computer can only provide Rose with one-way communication of former Prime Minister Harriet Jones' video conference with her militia of the Doctor's companions. Wilfred is impressed by Harriet, remarking he voted for her, only for Sylvia to reject this. He watches in shock as Harriet is exterminated by the Daleks on the computer.

In "Journey's End" because Donna's memory was wiped, Wilfred sees the Doctor off on her behalf and promises whenever he looks up at the stars, he'll think of the Doctor, considering him a very close friend. Against Sylvia's claims that Donna was just as good before travelling with the Time Lord, Wilfred stands his ground and maintains to his daughter that the Doctor made Donna a better person. While he agrees to keep the Doctor a secret, he also promises to keep watch for him in Donna's place in memory of his actions.

Wilfred returns in "The End of Time", in which he has repeated visions of the Master. He then repeatedly meets an unnamed woman and discovers depictions of the TARDIS included in historical art. He searches for and finds the Doctor, who has come to Earth to find the Master, Wilfred promptly joins him in the search. The Doctor tries to stop him, but lets him join because he does not want to deal with a furious Sylvia. The mysterious woman appears on television to tell Wilfred that he must take arms, prompting him to carry his old service revolver from his service in the British Army. The Doctor begins to suspect that something is keeping Wilfred close to him. They go to Joshua Naismith's mansion, where the Master transforms the entire human race in his image, but Wilfred is protected by the Doctor by placing him inside a chamber shielded from radiation. The two are captured by the Master, but are rescued by two aliens, Addams and Rossiter. Donna, who survived the incident, places a cell phone call to Wilfred which the Master tracks, but her pursuers are incapacitated when a fail-safe mechanism placed by the Doctor to suppress her memories activates. On the alien ship after being rescued, Wilfred succeeds in convincing the Doctor to take his gun with the intent of killing the Master with it. During the following missile attack on their ship, Wilfred gleefully mans a laser cannon to defend it. Upon their return to Earth, Wilfred traps himself in the radiation booth again while freeing a technician trapped in there and watches the Doctor's confrontation with the Master and Rassilon. Afterwards, the Doctor, amazed that he has seemingly survived, hears Wilfred fulfilling Carmen's prophecy that "he will knock four times" by knocking four times on the door to get the Doctor's attention. As the booth is about to be flooded with radiation, the Doctor sacrifices himself by exposing himself to the radiation instead. Wilfred offers to die for him, saying he has lived his life, but the Doctor saves him, considering it his honour. The radiation the Doctor absorbs to save Wilfred forces him to regenerate into his eleventh incarnation. Wilfred is last seen at Donna's wedding, where he is again visited by the dying Tenth Doctor, who gives him and Sylvia a winning lottery ticket as a wedding present for Donna. The Doctor had purchased the ticket with money borrowed in the past from Wilfred's late son-in-law, Geoffrey Noble. As the Doctor leaves for the last time, Wilfred tearfully salutes him.

In "The Star Beast", the now-94 years old Wilfred is mentioned to have moved into sheltered housing paid for by UNIT, as he can no longer handle the stairs in the family's new house. During the Beep the Meep crisis, the Nobles tell the Fourteenth Doctor, who shares the face of the Tenth Doctor, that Wilfred is gone, causing him to briefly misunderstand that Wilfred is dead. After the Doctor restores Donna's memories, they intend to go on one last trip together to visit Wilfred so that he will know that Donna's memories have returned and so that the Doctor can see his old friend one last time. However, after Donna accidentally spills coffee on the TARDIS console, it flies off uncontrollably to an unknown destination.

In "Wild Blue Yonder", a now wheelchair-using Wilfred greets the Doctor and Donna when they return to Earth a few days later. Wilfred is overjoyed by the return of Donna's memories and to be reunited with his old friend who is similarly pleased. However, Wilfred has sent the rest of the family to safety while he kept an eye for the Doctor and Donna's return. He informs the duo that he never lost faith about the Doctor returning to save Earth again, before chaos ensues. People all around begin fighting as Wilfred proceeds to state that "the whole world is coming to an end". He is subsequently taken to safety by UNIT, as seen in "The Giggle". Later, Wilfred is shooting at moles in the backyard when the Doctor joins the Noble family for dinner. The Doctor privately reveals that he had protected the moles from Wilfred using force fields as he's "fond of the moles".

== Production ==
Wilfred was played by Bernard Cribbins who appeared in the 1966 Doctor Who film, Daleks - Invasion Earth 2150 AD, as companion Special Constable Tom Campbell, a character replacing that of Ian Chesterton from the television serial The Dalek Invasion of Earth on which the film was based. Cribbins was also considered for the Fourth Doctor in 1974. In 2006, he became part of the revived series when a photograph of him at a wedding was used in the BBC's tie-in website for "Tooth and Claw". Cribbins also played a rock band manager in the Eighth Doctor radio play "Horror of Glam Rock" broadcast on BBC 7 in 2007.

Cribbins brought elements of his own costume for the role when filming "Voyage of the Damned", such as the hat with the Parachute Regiment badge from his National Service days.

Producer Phil Collinson stated in an interview for SFX that Wilfred Mott will "crop up again in the series several times". Collinson says of Cribbins "it's a great privilege to have him on set, he's wonderful" and "now we've got him we're keeping him! He is brilliant." Wilfred is not "strictly speaking" linked to Series 4's joining thread, but in the commentary for the first episode, it was suggested that his meeting the Doctor in the Christmas special may not have been accidental.

Following Wilfred Mott's appearance in "Voyage of the Damned", the character was reintroduced as a recurring character and it was established that he is Donna Noble's grandfather. The character replaces that of Donna's father, Geoff Noble, played by Howard Attfield in "The Runaway Bride", because Attfield died after filming scenes for "Partners in Crime". Collinson had the idea that Wilfred should be Donna's grandfather after Executive Producer Russell T Davies had decided that a grandfather character should replace the father character after Attfield's death. Davies and fellow Executive Producer Julie Gardner liked the idea, so Davies wrote Wilfred into "Partners in Crime". The character Cribbins portrayed in "Voyage of the Damned" was originally to have been called "Stan", but Davies felt that this was not a suitable name for a recurring character and renamed him "Wilfred". Davies was able to get the credits for "Voyage of the Damned" changed before its broadcast for consistency.

Cribbins played Mott for the final time in the 2023 special "Wild Blue Yonder", filmed in 2022 prior to his death in July of that year. The producers had wanted to film more scenes with him within the other 2023 specials, but his health only gave him enough time to film one scene. The character appears for the last time in the following episode "The Giggle" through the use of a stand-in and archival audio from "The Poison Sky".

== Reception ==
Laura Pledger of Radio Times named Cribbins the best Doctor Who guest star, writing, "When he wasn't making you smile, Wilfred Mott broke your heart". SFX placed the character at number 13 in a 2009 article listing the 27 things they loved best about the revival of Doctor Who.
