= The Sontaran Stratagem =

192a – "The Sontaran Stratagem"
- Doctor Who episode

Cast
- Doctor: David Tennant – Tenth Doctor
- Companions: Catherine Tate – Donna Noble; Freema Agyeman – Martha Jones
- Others: Christopher Ryan – General Staal; Rupert Holliday-Evans – Colonel Mace; Dan Starkey – Commander Skorr; Ryan Sampson – Luke Rattigan; Bernard Cribbins – Wilfred Mott; Jacqueline King – Sylvia Noble; Eleanor Matsuura – Jo Nakashima; Christian Cooke – Ross Jenkins; Clive Standen – Private Harris; Wesley Theobald – Private Gray; Ruari Mears – Clone

Production
- Directed by: Douglas Mackinnon
- Written by: Helen Raynor
- Produced by: Susie Liggat
- Executive producers: Russell T Davies; Julie Gardner; Phil Collinson
- Music by: Murray Gold
- Production code: 4.4
- Series: Series 4
- Running time: 1st of 2-part story, 45 minutes
- First broadcast: 26 April 2008

Chronology
← Preceded by "Planet of the Ood"	Followed by → "The Poison Sky"

"The Sontaran Stratagem" is the fourth episode of the fourth series of the British science fiction television series Doctor Who, which depicts the adventures of a time-travelling humanoid alien known as The Doctor. The episode was broadcast on BBC One on 26 April 2008. The episode and its sequel, "The Poison Sky", were written by Helen Raynor, who previously wrote the linked episodes "Daleks in Manhattan" and "Evolution of the Daleks" in the third series.

"The Sontaran Stratagem" features the first appearance of the alien Sontarans in the series since the 1985 story The Two Doctors, as well as former companion Martha Jones (Freema Agyeman), last seen in "Last of the Time Lords." The episode takes place on present-day Earth, where Martha and UNIT summon the Doctor (David Tennant) for assistance concerning ATMOS, a revolutionary piece of green technology installed in 400 million cars worldwide. ATMOS is later revealed to be part of a Sontaran plot to poison the atmosphere.

Showrunner Russell T Davies had considered bringing the Sontarans back since the revival of the series and wanted to show changes in Martha's personality after her departure. The episode was viewed by 7.06 million viewers after its original broadcast, with an Appreciation Index of 87. Critics gave generally positive reviews, praising the return of the Sontarans, Christopher Ryan's portrayal as Staal, and Raynor's writing; some stated Raynor improved from her previous episodes.

== Plot ==
Martha Jones, a former companion of the Tenth Doctor, calls him to ask for assistance during an investigation by UNIT. Minutes after the Doctor's craft, the TARDIS, materialises in contemporary Britain, Martha authorises the raid of an ATMOS factory. The Doctor introduces his companion Donna to Martha and UNIT; Donna instantly befriends Martha, but is concerned about UNIT's ethics.

ATMOS is marketing a satellite navigation system developed by young prodigy Luke Rattigan. The system also reduces carbon dioxide emissions to zero; UNIT requested the Doctor's help because the technology is not contemporary and might be alien. UNIT are also concerned about fifty-two simultaneous deaths occurring spontaneously several days earlier, all inside vehicles equipped with ATMOS. Whilst everyone else is studying the technology at the plant, Donna goes through the personnel offices and discovers there are no recorded absences by anyone in the plant: no-one is getting sick.

The Doctor travels to Rattigan's private school to investigate the system and discovers that the recent events have been plotted by an alien warrior race known as the Sontarans. The Sontarans are part of a battlegroup led by General Staal, "the undefeated", and Luke is his Earth Asset. Instead of an outright invasion, they are taking control with a combination of human clones, mind control, and ATMOS; Martha is captured by two of the controlled humans and cloned to provide a mole within UNIT.

Meanwhile, Donna returns home to explain to her mother Sylvia and her grandfather Wilfred that she has been travelling with the Doctor, after being advised to do so by Martha. Concerned about the implications of telling the truth, Donna decides against telling her mother. The Doctor investigates the ATMOS device attached to Donna's car and discovers a secondary function: the device can emit a poisonous gas. Wilfred attempts to take the car off the road, but is trapped when Staal activates all 400 million ATMOS devices installed in cars worldwide.

=== Continuity ===
The Doctor Who spin-off show: The Sarah Jane Adventures features the two part episodes The Last Sontaran in which the only survivor of "The Sontaran Stratagem" and "The Poison Sky": Commander Kaagh (also called Kaagh the Slayer) attempts to take revenge on Earth and The Doctor by crashing Earth's satellites into the storage facilities for nuclear weapon to cause a chain reaction resulting in a cataclysmic nuclear explosion killing the entire world population.

== Production ==
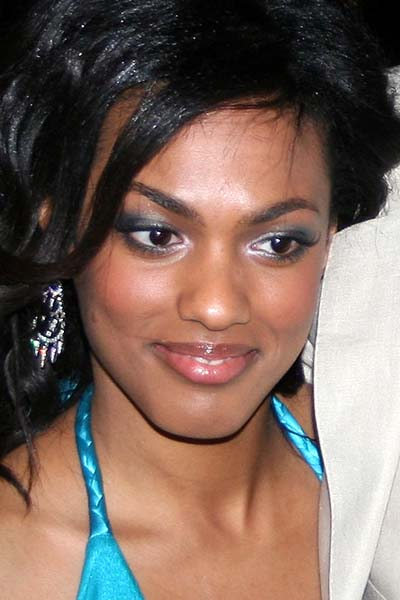
The episode sees the return of Freema Agyeman as Martha Jones.

=== Conception ===
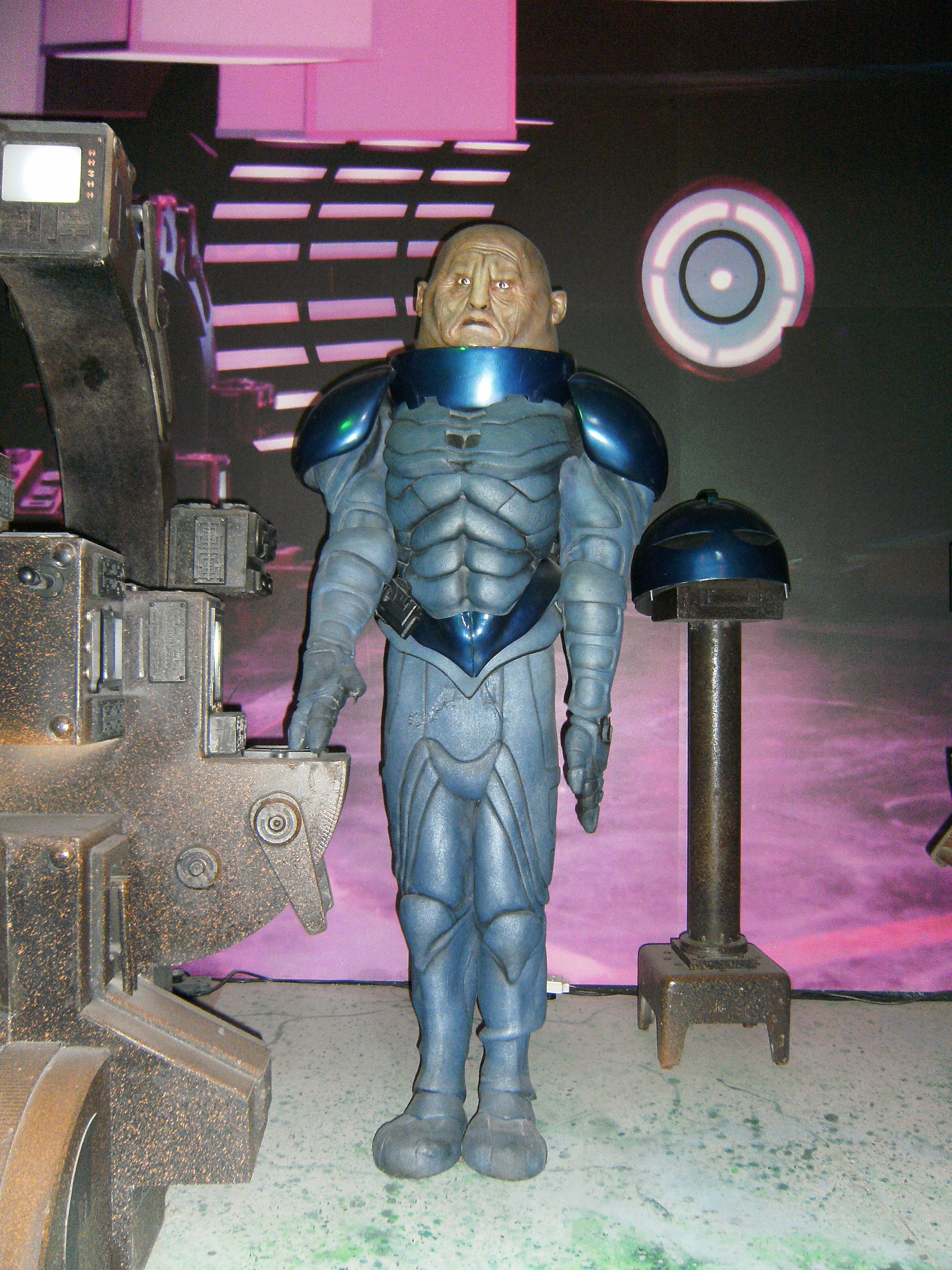
The Sontarans as they appear at the Doctor Who Experience.

The episode features the return of the Sontarans, who last appeared in the 1985 serial The Two Doctors; a central appearance by UNIT; and Martha Jones, who had last appeared in "Last of the Time Lords" and made special guest appearances in the Torchwood episodes "Reset", "Dead Man Walking", and "A Day in the Death." The brief that executive producer Russell T Davies gave to writer Helen Raynor included the terms "Sontarans", "military", and "Martha's back".

This episode continues the pattern of having monsters from the classic series return in the new one. Davies commented that the Sontarans were "always on his list" of villains to resurrect. The time and location of the episode was chosen because every previous Sontaran story except for The Invasion of Time (1978) was set on Earth.

=== Writing ===
Martha's departure allowed Davies to change the character's personality. In her reappearance, she is more mature and equal to the Doctor, as opposed to the third series, in which she was in love with him. The writers debated several aspects of her character, her status and reaction to Donna in particular. Raynor elected to emphasise Martha's medical career over her military career, and avoided a "handbags at dawn" scenario because she felt it would rehash Rose Tyler's (Billie Piper) initial opinion of former companion Sarah Jane Smith (Elisabeth Sladen) from the second series episode "School Reunion".

The episode is the first major appearance of UNIT since the show's revival. Their name has changed from United Nations Intelligence Taskforce to Unified Intelligence Taskforce at the request of the United Nations, who cited the political climate and potential "brand confusion" as reasons for disassociation. The new acronym was coined by Davies after several meetings among the scriptwriters. The UNIT privates Gray and Wilson were specifically written as "alien fodder". The episode refers to inconsistencies in dating UNIT stories when the Doctor is unsure whether he worked for UNIT in the 1970s or 1980s.

Raynor initially envisioned the poisonous gas would be emitted by factories, but changed it in later drafts to cars for several reasons: the episode would provide social commentary and the idea of an "evil satnav system" was "much more engageable" and "irresistible". Davies thought the concept was "so very Doctor Who". Because the series was produced out of order, the "ATMOS" subplot was seeded in the previous episode "Partners in Crime". The "fifteenth broken moon" of the Medusa Cascade is also mentioned. The Medusa Cascade was previously mentioned in "Last of the Time Lords", "Partners in Crime", and in "The Fires of Pompeii". In the episode, a system installed in a UNIT jeep undramatically explodes; originally, Raynor wanted it to be a large explosion, but reduced the explosion to several sparks to reduce costs and to lampoon an action movie cliché.

The episode, like "Aliens of London" and "The Lazarus Experiment", properly introduces the lead companion's family. Unlike the Tyler or Jones families, both Sylvia Noble and Wilfred Mott had met the Doctor before (in "The Runaway Bride" and "Voyage of the Damned", respectively), providing Raynor with an additional subplot. Expository dialogue explains Mott's absence from "The Runaway Bride" by the character having had Spanish flu. Wilfred's positive opinion of the Doctor is different from Sylvia's, who, according to Tennant, joined "a long line of mothers that don't quite get the Doctor"; Davies had wanted a family member who trusted the Doctor since the show's revival.

=== Filming ===
The opening scene, which depicts the system driving reporter Jo Nakashima into the canal, was filmed at Cardiff's docks. The scene was the first time a car-cannon had been used since 2005, and was required to be completed in one shot. The car fired into the canal was removed immediately afterwards to clear the shipping route. Scenes at the Rattigan Academy were filmed at Margam Country Park, Port Talbot from 23 to 26 October 2007. The London skyline and gas were added in post-production by The Mill.

When interviewed on Friday Night with Jonathan Ross, Catherine Tate stated that she had been filming alongside ten actors playing Sontarans for two weeks before she realised that there were actors inside the Sontaran costumes. She had assumed the Sontarans "ran on electricity". It was not until an actor removed his helmet to reveal his real face that she realised her mistake. She stated she was "freaked out" by this and said she "nearly died".

Despite the Sontarans' clone culture being asserted in the classic series, "The Sontaran Strategem" is the first episode to depict the cloning process. Originally, all of the factory workers were to be clones, but Raynor reduced this to only Martha to solve continuity problems with the second part. The template clone was portrayed by Ruari Mears, who wore a prosthetic mask that took longer to apply than any he had previously worn. The scenes involving the cloning tank were filmed in a Welsh shampoo factory and reused a prop from "The Fires of Pompeii" as the tank which contained the clone. Davies and Agyeman enjoyed the scenes set in the cloning room; Agyeman liked playing an "evil companion", who she and Davies felt made the real Martha "warmer", and Davies thought Privates Gray and Harris discovering the tank in a darkened room was "classic Doctor Who".

== Broadcast and reception ==
=== Broadcast and ratings ===
"The Sontaran Strategem" was the most-watched programme in its timeslot, with 7.06 million viewers. The episode was the second most-watched programme of the day, beaten by Britain's Got Talent, and was the seventeenth most-watched programme of the week. The episode's Appreciation Index was 87 (considered "Excellent"), the highest figure recorded on its airdate.

=== Critical reception ===
The Sontaran Stratagem is about as deliciously old-fashioned as new Who gets. It makes my fan boy sense tingle and makes me grin like an idiot. The Doctor, working with UNIT again, alongside two great companions, and taking on a faithfully realised monster from the classic series.

— Mark Wright

Mark Wright of The Stage commented overall that the episode was "about as deliciously old-fashioned as new Who gets," stating that the script was "a deftly simple premise that makes you wonder why you didn't think of it yourself", and that Tate's character moved away from the caricature in "The Runaway Bride". Wright also praised Agyeman for "effortlessly" portraying Martha and her evil cloned counterpart. A fan of the Sontarans, Wright reacted positively to their return and redesign. Ben Rawson-Jones of Digital Spy rated the episode four stars out of five. Rawson-Jones felt the narrative was well plotted and paced, and felt Helen Raynor's writing had improved from "Daleks in Manhattan". Rawson-Jones also praised the reintroductions of UNIT, Martha, Donna's family and the Sontarans, the interaction between Donna and Martha, and Christopher Ryan's portrayal of Staal, but felt Skorr's voice was "distinctly lacklustre." The episode's direction by Douglas Mackinnon also received criticism, particularly the scenes in the clone room. In the end, Rawson-Jones felt that the first part's effectiveness lies on how much the viewers wish to tune in to see "The Poison Sky".

Matt Wales of IGN rated the episode a "good" 7.9 out of 10, stating that despite the episode's premise, it came "perilously close to greatness," and praised Raynor's "crackling script which graciously walked the tightrope between balls-out farce and affectionate sci-fi pastiche". Wales noted that Tennant and Tate "relished" the perpetual swings from "square-jawed serious" to "faintly sadistic subversion", to mess with audience expectations. Ryan's performance as Staal was again praised, but Wales felt Agyeman still displayed "the charisma and range of a dead fish, despite Martha's transformation from lovesick sap to Ripley-esque super soldier." Wales summed up that the episode "did pretty much everything a two-part opener should – swiftly shifting the pieces into place for next week's inevitably bombastic showdown." Alan Stanley Bear of Airlock Alpha called "The Sontaran Strategem" an "exciting and nostalgic adventure", and said that the episode lives up to the show's reputation for transforming a normal object, in this case the car, to a "global killer". Bear praised the episode for Donna and Martha's introduction being opposite to Rose Tyler and Sarah Jane Smith's in "School Reunion", for providing a human element in the subplot where Donna visits her grandfather, and for the episode's cliffhanger. However, Bear wrote that it took too long to "get to the point", and criticized the "bland Sontaran dialogue and the clichéd simplicity of mind control", which he felt "reduced what could have been a fantastically intricate story piece into Saturday morning cartoon material."

John Beresford of TV Scoop thought the episode lived up to many of his expectations, with sharp dialogue and some humour, a well-plotted story, and a good pace overall with a "heap of action", despite the episode's slow start. Beresford also praised the reintroduction of UNIT from the "old, tired UNIT" to a "newly revamped and spiffy UNIT with lots of cool gadgets", the Doctor's meeting with Rattigan, calling the scene "an inspired piece of writing", and the episode's cliffhanger, calling it "the best yet". He also believed the ATMOS idea worked well. The only weak spot Beresford noted was that the Sontarans appeared to have been softened from their previous appearance, stating that Staal would "shoot first and ask questions later."
