= The Star Beast (Doctor Who episode) =

301 – "The Star Beast"
- Doctor Who episode
- Promotional poster

Cast
- Doctor: David Tennant – Fourteenth Doctor
- Companion: Catherine Tate – Donna Noble
- Others: Yasmin Finney – Rose Noble; Karl Collins – Shaun Temple; Matt Green – BBC reporter; Jamie Cho – Colonel Chan; Ruth Madeley – Shirley Bingham; Harley Mcevilly, Max Fincham – Lads; Jacqueline King – Sylvia Noble; Dara Lall – Fudge Merchandani; Cecily Fay – The Meep; Brian Herring, Phill Woodfine – Meep animatronics; Robert Strange, Stephen Love, Jordan Benjamin, Vassili Psaltopoulos – Wrarth Warriors; Isabella Carey – Soldier; Ronak Patani – Major Singh; Ned Porteous – voice of Zogroth; John Hopkinson – voice of Zreeg; Anna Martine Freeman – Chief Technician; Archie Backhouse – Sergeant; Miriam Margolyes – voice of the Meep

Production
- Directed by: Rachel Talalay
- Written by: Russell T Davies, from a story by Pat Mills and Dave Gibbons
- Produced by: Vicki Delow
- Executive producers: Russell T Davies; Julie Gardner; Jane Tranter; Joel Collins; Phil Collinson
- Music by: Murray Gold
- Series: 2023 specials
- Running time: 57 minutes
- First broadcast: 25 November 2023

Chronology
← Preceded by "The Power of the Doctor"	Followed by → "Wild Blue Yonder"

"The Star Beast" is the first of three hour-long special episodes of the British science fiction television programme Doctor Who, marking its 60th anniversary. Based on a comic written by Pat Mills and Dave Gibbons for Doctor Who Magazine in 1980, the episode was written by returning head writer and showrunner Russell T Davies, directed by Rachel Talalay, and was first broadcast on BBC One on 25 November 2023. It serves as the reintroductions of David Tennant and Catherine Tate to the series. Tennant makes his first regular appearance as the Fourteenth Doctor, having previously played the Tenth Doctor during Davies' original tenure as showrunner, last seen in the 50th anniversary special "The Day of the Doctor" (2013), while Tate reprises her role as Donna Noble. The episode also sees the return of Jacqueline King as Sylvia Noble and Karl Collins as Shaun Temple with newcomer Yasmin Finney as Rose Noble, and guest starring Miriam Margolyes as the voice of The Meep.

The episode focuses on the newly regenerated Doctor being drawn back to the life of former companion Donna Noble, whose memory he was forced to erase to save her life in "Journey's End" (2008). Upon his arrival to present-day London, he is caught up in a fight to the death when a spaceship crash-lands, with an alien army of Wrarth Warriors pursuing a small furry creature known as the Meep.

"The Star Beast" is the first Doctor Who episode to be led by Davies and Julie Gardner since the two-part Christmas special "The End of Time" (2009–2010) and marks the return of former producer Phil Collinson, who left the programme after the conclusion of the fourth series, as an executive producer. Composer Murray Gold also returns to the series for the first time since the 2017 Christmas special "Twice Upon a Time".

The episode was watched by 7.61 million viewers, the show's highest viewing figures since "The Tsuranga Conundrum" (2018), which was watched by 7.76 million viewers. It received generally positive reviews from critics, who praised Tennant and Tate's reintroduction to the series along with the introduction of Rose, a transgender character, whilst the resolution to the meta-crisis storyline from "Journey's End" and transgender themes received mixed responses.

== Plot ==
Following his regeneration, the Fourteenth Doctor lands in London where he comes across Donna Noble, who does not remember him, since the Doctor erased her memory of him to save her life after the meta-crisis. He also meets Donna's teenage daughter Rose and her husband Shawn Temple. A spaceship crashes; the Doctor travels to the crash site and meets UNIT scientist Shirley Anne Bingham. The Doctor describes his confusion as to why he resembles his tenth incarnation and his re-entry into Donna's life, believing the two events are connected, and confesses his fear that the return of Donna's memories will kill her. Shirley sends in soldiers to investigate the spaceship, only for them to become controlled by an unknown force. Rose's friend tells her of an escape pod from the ship landing near her home, and she soon encounters a small creature called the Meep.

Rose hides the Meep amongst her stuffed toys, but Donna discovers it, and it runs off. The Doctor arrives at her house, and is confronted by an angry Sylvia, Donna's mother. The Doctor defuses the situation and together they learn of the Meep's history – it states it has two hearts (like the Doctor) and claims the bug-like Wrarth Warriors are hunting it.

The UNIT soldiers and the Wrarths begin fighting. The Doctor gets the Meep and Donna's family out but realizes the Wrarths are not using lethal force. He holds a trial with the Meep and two of the Wrarths, who reveal that the Meep is actually a vicious being who is attempting to rule the universe. The Meep drops its façade, kills the two Wrarths and reveals that it is controlling the soldiers. It threatens to kill the Doctor and Donna's family, but the Doctor suggests a link between himself and the Meep, prompting it to take them hostage instead.

The Meep plans to escape Earth by reigniting its ship, destroying London in the process. The Doctor and Donna's family are rescued by Shirley, but the Doctor and Donna, who is starting to remember her past, go to stop the Meep. Trapped within the ship and running out of time, the Doctor reawakens Donna's memories, and they manage to shut it down. To the Doctor's surprise, Donna does not die; with Rose's birth, Donna had passed down part of the meta-crisis into her, transferring parts of her memories of the Doctor. Rose uses her newfound knowledge to free the UNIT soldiers from the Meep's control. The Meep is captured by further Wrarths, but before being taken away it gives a cryptic warning to the Doctor. Donna and Rose expel the rest of the meta-crisis from their bodies safely, after which Donna joins the Doctor on an intended quick trip in the TARDIS to visit her grandfather Wilfred, but the ship malfunctions when she accidentally spills coffee on the control console.

== Production ==
=== Development ===
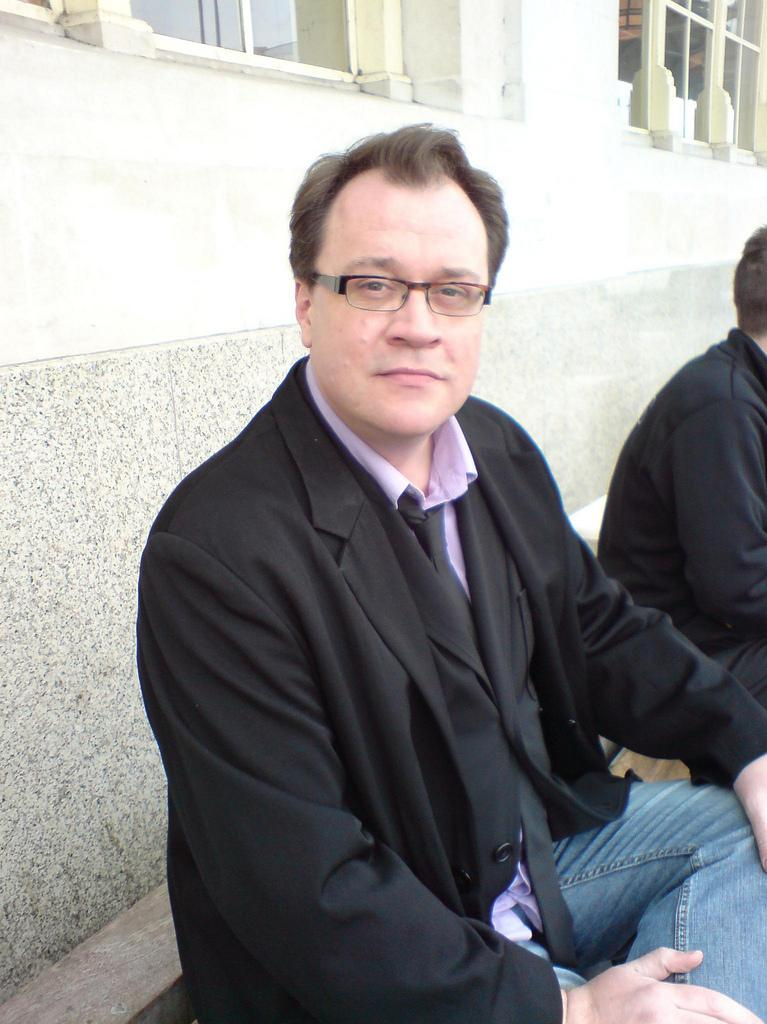
Russell T Davies, who returned to Doctor Who as showrunner and lead writer for the 60th anniversary specials and series beyond

The episode was the first of the 2023 specials, following the departure of executive producer Chris Chibnall and Thirteenth Doctor star Jodie Whittaker after the 2022 specials. On 24 September 2021, it was announced Russell T Davies would return to Doctor Who as showrunner. The episode commences the fourth era of production in the revived series, following Davies' first tenure as showrunner from 2005 to 2010, Steven Moffat's from 2010 to 2017 and Chibnall's from 2018 to 2022. Davies said that his decision to return was due to the excitement surrounding the return of David Tennant and Catherine Tate, adding that he never really moved on from the programme.

Davies was joined by the Bad Wolf production company, which was founded by fellow former Doctor Who executive producer Julie Gardner and former BBC head of drama Jane Tranter. Bad Wolf also took over creative control of Doctor Who beginning with the special, allowing BBC Studios to focus on establishing Doctor Who as a global brand.

Disney acquired the international streaming rights to Doctor Who. Following the deal many speculated that the budget would be increased to ten million pounds per episode. While Davies denied the rumour, he did confirm that they would have a higher budget.

Phil Collinson, Gardner and Tranter all returned to the show as executive producers, alongside newcomer Joel Collins. Davies confirmed by March 2022 that pre-production had begun at Bad Wolf Studios in Cardiff. Tim Hodges edited the special.

Beep the Meep as depicted in the Doctor Who Magazine comics, published by Marvel UK

=== Writing ===
The story is based on the comic strip "The Star Beast" written by Pat Mills and illustrated by Dave Gibbons that appeared in Doctor Who Weekly in 1980. The comic strip features the Fourth Doctor facing off against Beep the Meep, and was adapted into an audio story by Big Finish Productions in 2019. Gibbons said that the BBC paid him and Mills to use the story, even though the show could have used the characters regardless.

Davies maintained the main plot of the comic but added plot threads about the meta-crisis storyline and transgender themes. Gibbons described the episode as "so faithful to the comic. It's very true to the spirit of it."

=== Casting ===
David Tennant and Catherine Tate both returned to the series as part of the 60th anniversary specials. Tennant made his first full appearance as the Fourteenth Doctor, while Tate reprised her role as Donna Noble. Tate last appeared in the final story of Tennant's tenure as the Tenth Doctor, "The End of Time".

On 25 December 2022, it was announced that Jacqueline King and Karl Collins were also set to return as Sylvia Noble and Shaun Temple, respectively, both of whom last appeared in "The End of Time", and that Ruth Madeley would appear as Shirley Anne Bingham. Yasmin Finney joined the cast for the anniversary to portray a character named Rose. The BBC later confirmed the surname of the character to be Noble, revealing that Finney would play the daughter of Donna and Shaun. On 14 September 2023, Miriam Margolyes was announced to be joining the cast as the voice of the Meep.

=== Filming ===
Rachel Talalay returned to direct the special, having previously directed the episodes "Dark Water" / "Death in Heaven" (2014), "Heaven Sent" and "Hell Bent" (2015), "World Enough and Time" / "The Doctor Falls" and "Twice Upon a Time" (2017). Filming for "The Star Beast" began on 9 May 2022. Portions of the episode were filmed at Uskmouth power stations in South Wales. Millennium FX designed the Meep costume which took six people to operate during filming.

== Broadcast and reception ==
Professional ratings
Aggregate scores
Source	Rating
Rotten Tomatoes (Tomatometer)	93%
Review scores
Source	Rating
Empire	4/5 stars
The Independent	4/5 stars
The Guardian	4/5 stars
The Daily Telegraph	4/5 stars
i	4/5 stars

=== Broadcast ===
"The Star Beast" was broadcast on 25 November 2023 as the first of the three 2023 specials, filmed for the 60th anniversary of Doctor Who. The episode had its press release and premiere on 6 November at Battersea Power Station in London. The episode also had a special screening as part of the anniversary celebrations on 23 November at the Royal Television Society in Cardiff.

The special was released internationally on Disney+.

=== Ratings ===
"The Star Beast" was watched by 5.08 million viewers overnight, making it the highest overnight viewership since "Resolution" (2019), which received 5.15 million overnight viewers, and the second-most watched programme of the night, behind Strictly Come Dancing but beating ITV1's I'm a Celebrity...Get Me Out of Here! Additionally, the special became the biggest launch for a British television drama series of 2023 so far. Consolidated figures gave a figure of 7.61 million viewers, the highest ratings since "The Tsuranga Conundrum" (2018) which received 7.76 million viewers. It was the tenth most watched programme of the week. The episode received an Appreciation Index score of 84, the highest since "World Enough and Time" (2017). On 14 December 2023, Davies announced on Instagram that the episode had reached 9 million viewers officially.

=== Critical reception ===
"The Star Beast" was met with positive reviews from critics. On Rotten Tomatoes, a review aggregator website, 90% of 30 critics gave "The Star Beast" a positive review. The site's consensus reads "A lively romp that reunites David Tennant and Catherine Tate, 'The Star Beast' returns fan-favorite characters for a nostalgic adventure that hints at Doctor Who's broader reinvention." The depiction of Beep the Meep in the episode was met with near unanimous praise from critics.

Joshua Rivera writing for Polygon praised the episode on its nostalgic qualities, particularly praising the performance of Tate and Tennant describing their chemistry as "very silly" and as if they were never apart. Rivera felt that special was an improvement from the Chibnall-written episodes, and felt eager for the next two specials. The Guardian's Jack Seale rated the special a 4/5, describing it as being "fun, light and fast", and praised the performance of Tennant and Tate, saying they had perfect chemistry.

Anita Singh, writing in The Sunday Telegraph, rated the episode a 4/5 and said that it was "... a perfect re-entry for a franchise that needs to win back public affection." Writing for The Independent, Ed Power praised the episode's 'back to basics' approach after the convoluted Chibnall era, in particular singling out Tennant's performance as the Fourteenth Doctor.

The episode's transgender themes received mixed reactions from critics, who both praised and criticised it. The BBC received 144 complaints from viewers who said the inclusion of transgender character Rose was "inappropriate". The BBC responded to the complaints, defending the character by stating that it was important to include the character and that "the show has and will always continue to proudly celebrate diversity and reflect the world we live in." Seale praised the episode's handling of the transgender community as "tender" and "gloriously, air-punchingly affirmative". Singh criticized the episode's pro-transgender stance feeling that it was annoying and poorly put together. The BBC's Neil Armstrong labelled the focus on progressive views as "preachy".

== Home media ==
The Star Beast
- Author: Gary Russell
- Series: Doctor Who book: Target novelisations
- Publisher: BBC Books
- Publication date: 30 November 2023 (eBook); 11 January 2024 (paperback); 1 February 2024 (audiobook)
- Pages: 160
- ISBN: 978-1-785-94845-9

"The Star Beast", along with the other two specials "Wild Blue Yonder" and "The Giggle", were released together on DVD and Blu-ray on 18 December 2023 as part of the "60th anniversary collection".

=== In print ===
A novelisation of the episode, written by Gary Russell, was released as an eBook on 30 November 2023. The paperback edition was available for pre-order in July 2023, and was released on 11 January 2024 as part of the Target Collection, and as an audiobook read by Jacqueline King on 1 February 2024.
