= Rupert Holliday-Evans =

English actor

- Occupation: Actor
- Years active: 1987–present
- Notable work: The Bill

Rupert Holliday-Evans (also spelt Rupert Holliday Evans) is a British actor. He is well known for his roles in programmes such as the ITV police drama The Bill and CBBC children's programmes The Giblet Boys and Powers.

== Early life and education ==
Rupert Holliday-Evans attended The Prebendal School until he was 13, then went on to Bishop Luffa C of E School, both of which are in Chichester, West Sussex.

He then studied at the Guildhall School of Music and Drama.

== Career ==
In episodes of comedy sketch show Harry Enfield's Television Programme Holliday-Evans played one of the Double-Take Brothers. He also appeared in the ITV police drama The Bill and CBBC children's programmes The Giblet Boys and Powers.

He played the role of Colonel Mace in the Doctor Who two-part episodes "The Sontaran Stratagem" and "The Poison Sky".

He played the part of an English sailor in the 1988 film Dirty Rotten Scoundrels.

== Filmography ==
- The Bill (12 episodes 1990–2007) as various, including Larry Franks and Barry Cutler
- Bergerac (1990) "There for the Picking", 1990 Christmas Special, as Baz
- A Touch of Frost (1995) Series 3 episode 1 as Richard Martin
- Pie in the Sky (1996 episode "Gary's Cake") as DS Stringer
- 84 Charing Cross Road (1987) as Party Guest
- Hornblower (1998) as Steward
- Cider with Rosie (1998) as Deserter
- Dirty Rotten Scoundrels (1988) as English Sailor # 1
- Second Sight (2000) as DC Pewsey
- Powers (2004) as Professor Henry Powers
- The Giblet Boys (2005) as "Dad"
- Doctor Who (2008 episodes "The Sontaran Stratagem" and "The Poison Sky") as Colonel Mace
- Skins (2008 episode 10 "Everyone")
- My Family (2009) as an MI5 Officer
- Midsomer Murders (2010) episode "The Silent Land" as Adam Peach
- EastEnders (21 September – 2 October 2015) as Jury Foreman
- Call the Midwife (2014) Series 5 Episode 5 as Mr Phillips
- Patrick (2018) as Mr. Peters
- Father Brown (2019) Season 7 Episode 2: "The Passing Bell" as Mervyn Glossop
- Muse (2019) as The Bailiff
- Six Minutes to Midnight (2020) as Band Leader
- Doctors (2 March 2021) as Bob Wainwright
- Nemesis (2021) as Lewis
- Showtrial (October 2021) as Brian Reeves
