= The Poison Sky =

192b – "The Poison Sky"
- Doctor Who episode

Cast
- Doctor: David Tennant – Tenth Doctor
- Companions: Catherine Tate – Donna Noble; Freema Agyeman – Martha Jones
- Others: Christopher Ryan – General Staal; Rupert Holliday-Evans – Colonel Mace; Bridget Hodson – Captain Price; Dan Starkey – Commander Skorr; Bernard Cribbins – Wilfred Mott; Jacqueline King – Sylvia Noble; Ryan Sampson – Luke Rattigan; Christian Cooke – Private Ross Jenkins; Clive Standen – Private Harris; Wesley Theobald – Private Gray; Meryl Fernandes – Female Student; Leeshon Alexander – Male Student; Kirsty Wark – Herself; Lachele Carl – US Newsreader

Production
- Directed by: Douglas Mackinnon
- Written by: Helen Raynor
- Produced by: Susie Liggat
- Executive producers: Russell T Davies; Julie Gardner; Phil Collinson
- Music by: Murray Gold
- Production code: 4.5
- Series: Series 4
- Running time: 2nd of 2-part story, 45 minutes
- First broadcast: 3 May 2008

Chronology
← Preceded by "The Sontaran Stratagem"	Followed by → "The Doctor's Daughter"

"The Poison Sky" is the fifth episode of the fourth series of the British science fiction television series Doctor Who. It was broadcast on BBC One on 3 May 2008. The episode features both former companion Martha Jones and the alien Sontarans. It is the second of a two-part story; the first part, "The Sontaran Stratagem", was broadcast on 26 April.

Continuing from the previous episode, "The Poison Sky" reveals the poisonous gas that is choking the Earth's atmosphere is intended as a way of feeding new batches of Sontaran clones that would be bred on Earth for war.

== Plot ==
Four hundred million cars on Earth equipped with ATMOS devices are suffocating humanity with poisonous gas. Sylvia frees Wilfred from her car by breaking the windscreen. The Tenth Doctor tells Donna's family to get inside and seal the windows and doors as best they can. He and Donna return to the ATMOS factory, where the Doctor warns UNIT not to engage the Sontarans. The Doctor tells Donna to stay in the TARDIS for her own safety, but the Sontarans locate and teleport the TARDIS aboard their ship.

When the Sontarans prevent UNIT from launching a nuclear missile at their ship with help from the clone of Martha, the Doctor works out that since their ship was safe, the Sontarans were really preventing the disruption of their atmospheric conversion. The Sontarans attack and take over the factory, easily overwhelming UNIT troops. UNIT manages a counterattack and calls in the aircraft carrier Valiant, which puts the Sontarans on the defensive. Following UNIT's offensive, the Doctor ventures into the factory and discovers the real Martha in one of the Sontarans' cloning devices. Having long suspected the truth, the Doctor awakens the real Martha, killing the clone in the process. Before dying, the clone reveals the gas is clone feed, which the Doctor deduces is used to breed billions of Sontaran soldiers on Earth. The Doctor tells Martha to keep UNIT from launching any missiles and rushes off.

The Doctor, assisted by Donna, uses the teleport to return the TARDIS to Earth. They teleport with Martha to Rattigan's institution, finding him distraught after finding that the Sontarans' promise to give him a new world was a lie. The Doctor constructs his own atmospheric converter, which ignites the poison gas across the globe and allows the humans to breathe. The Doctor is aware the Sontarans will not concede defeat but feels that he needs to give them a chance to withdraw. He teleports to the Sontaran ship and offers Staal the chance to retreat, but Staal calls the Doctor's bluff and encourages him to destroy them. Humbled, Rattigan reactivates the teleport and switches places with the Doctor, sacrificing himself to activate the device and destroy the Sontarans. (Note: Except one Sontaran survivor named Commander Kaagh as depicted in The Sarah Jane Adventures series 2 premiere The Last Sontaran.)

Afterward, Martha says goodbye to Donna and the Doctor inside the TARDIS and prepares to head home. Before she can leave, however, the TARDIS doors suddenly snap shut and it heads to another destination.

== Production ==
=== Writing ===
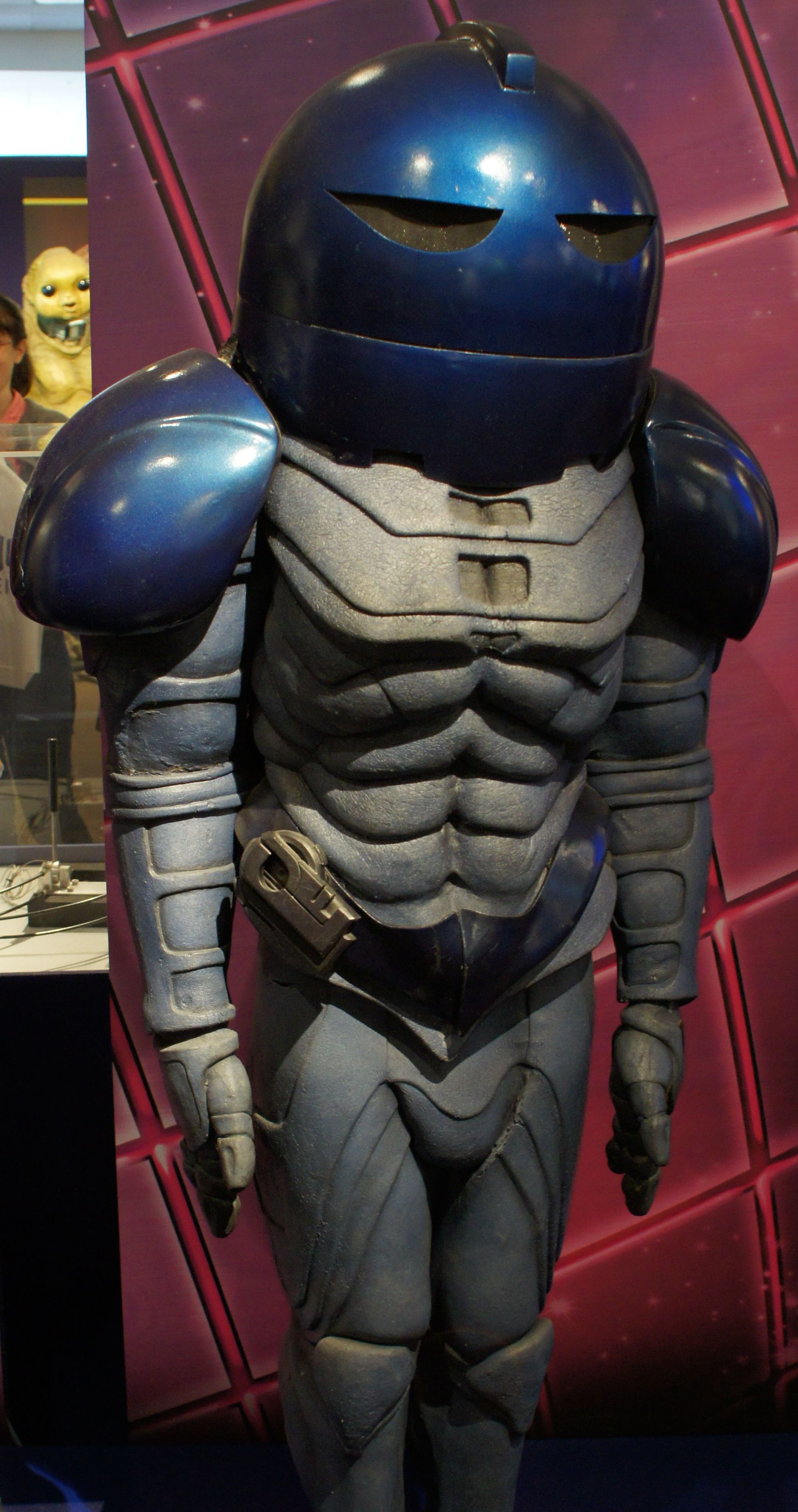
The Sontarans in their helmets, as shown at the Doctor Who Experience.

The Valiant is equipped with a version of the Torchwood weapon that destroyed the Sycorax ship in "The Christmas Invasion". The Doctor remarks to Colonel Mace, "At times like this, I could do with the Brigadier...no offence." This is a reference to Brigadier Lethbridge-Stewart. The Doctor quips "Are you my mummy?" to Colonel Mace while they are wearing gas masks, in reference to the events of "The Empty Child"/"The Doctor Dances".

When the Doctor interrupts the Sontarans' transmission, animated footage from CBeebies's part live action, part animation eco adventure show Tommy Zoom is brought up on screen featuring the villainous Polluto disguised as a magician and the heroic Tommy and his dog Daniel as his audience. Originally, the plan was to use Shaun the Sheep, but this fell through.

As in many previous episodes of the revived series, supposed BBC News 24 footage is used featuring reports of unfolding events. However, as with the more recent appearances of such footage in Doctor Who, the channel is simply captioned on screen as 'News 24' devoid of the BBC logo. Since this episode was produced, the BBC News 24 channel was rebranded in real life as BBC News.

Donna's mispronunciation of Sontaran stems from the original production of The Time Warrior, the first Doctor Who serial to feature the Sontarans. Kevin Lindsay, who portrayed Linx in the story, pronounced the word as it has always been used, with emphasis on "Son-TAR-an", whereas the director Alan Bromly wanted it pronounced with no emphasis. Kevin Lindsay won the argument, claiming "I'm from the bloody planet, I think I know how to pronounce my own name!"

=== Filming ===
This episode and the previous episode were filmed over five weeks, beginning in September 2007. Post-production was completed a week before the first part aired. Scenes at the Rattigan Academy were filmed at Margam Country Park, Port Talbot.

During production, director Douglas Mackinnon intended to have the episode's climactic scene in the TARDIS show the moveable column in the centre console move up and down much more rapidly than normal. However, when attempting to accomplish this, Mackinnon ended up breaking the prop, which took thirty minutes to repair.

When interviewed on Friday Night with Jonathan Ross, Catherine Tate stated that she had been filming alongside ten actors playing Sontarans for two weeks before she realised that there were actors inside the Sontaran costumes. She had assumed the Sontarans "ran on electricity". It was not until an actor removed his helmet to reveal his real face that she realised her mistake. She stated she was "freaked out" by this and said she "nearly died".

== Broadcast ==
Unofficial overnight figures indicated that "The Poison Sky" was watched by 5.9 million viewers, giving it a 32.5% share of the total television audience. The final consolidated figure was 6.53 million viewers. It was the second most watched programme of the day, being beaten by ITV's Britain's Got Talent, which got 9.12 million viewers. It was the highest rated programme on BBC1 for the day and the 18th most watched of the week. The episode received an Appreciation Index score of 88 (considered "Excellent").

== Bibliography ==
- Pixley, Andrew (19 November 2008). "Series Four Companion". Doctor Who Magazine. No. 20 – Special Edition.
