= Mark Morris (author) =

English author (born 1963)

- Born: 15 June 1963 (age 63); Bolsover, Derbyshire, United Kingdom
- Occupation: Writer
- Writing career
- Pen name: J. M. Morris (for Fiddleback)
- Genres: Horror, thriller, dark fantasy, science fiction
- Subjects: Doctor Who, Torchwood, and others
- Website: www.markmorrisfiction.com

Mark Morris (born 15 June 1963) is an English author known for his series of horror novels, although he has also written several novels based on the BBC Television series Doctor Who. He used the pseudonym J. M. Morris for his 2001 novel Fiddleback.

== Biography ==
He currently lives in Tadcaster, North Yorkshire, in a 200-year-old stone house, with his wife, the artist Nel Whatmore. They have two children.

== Career ==
Morris began his writing career in 1988 as part of the (now defunct) Enterprise Allowance Scheme, which was at that time paying claimants £30 a week to be self-employed. His first novel, Toady, was published in 1989 (re-titled The Horror Club, and its text shortened by one-third for the US market) and several further books followed: Stitch, The Immaculate, The Secret of Anatomy, Mr Bad Face, Longbarrow, Genesis and Nowhere Near an Angel. Before Toady, he had written a novel called The Winter Tree, which was rejected by publishers, but allowed him to gain him some familiarity with them.

In addition to his major works, Morris has published, as chapbooks, the novellas The Dogs (for Barrington Stoke, an imprint for 'reluctant readers') and The Uglimen.

Morris has written a great deal of other short fiction, too, his first published short story being 1988's "Homeward Bound," published in the magazine Dark Dreams (#6, 1988) and continuing well into the 21st century (for example, 2014's "Sins Like Scarlet," co-written with Rio Youers) in the anthology Dark Duets: All-New Tales of Horror and Dark Fantasy. Morris has contributed many book reviews to the genre field, as well as essays.

He has also published two volumes of short stories, Close to the Bone and Voyages into Darkness (with Stephen Laws) and a novel as "J.M. Morris": Fiddleback (which was renamed The Lonely Places and had a slightly longer epilogue for the US market, which the author claims was "in order to (quote from US editor): 'clarify matters for a US readership.'"). A further collection of short fiction, Separate Skins, was due for release from British small press publisher Tanjen, but the publisher went out of business around that time and the book — introduced by Graham Joyce - remains unpublished.

A fan of Doctor Who since being terrified by the show as a child, Morris has so far written several books for the BBC Books Doctor Who ranges. For the Eighth Doctor Adventures he wrote The Bodysnatchers, for the Past Doctor Adventures the novel Deep Blue, then Forever Autumn and Ghosts of India as part of the New Series Adventures, with the Torchwood novel Bay of the Dead being released on 29 May 2009.

He has also written Doctor Who-related audio plays for Big Finish Productions including False Gods, Plague of the Daleks, House of Blue Fire, Moonflesh and The Necropolis Express for the Jago and Litefoot spin-off series.

The novel Nowhere near an Angel was intended to be his second J. M. Morris novel for Macmillan, but they rejected it as they considered 'J. M. Morris' to be a female writer (Fiddleback was written from a female point of view), despite Mark's publicity appearances for the novel. Nowhere Near An Angel was published by PS Publishing, and a further planned J. M. Morris novel, "Cold Harbour" was later reworked as "The Black".

He is currently published by the small press publisher PS Publishing. Morris has also worked in the retail sector for the book retailer Borders in Leeds.

== Bibliography ==
=== Novels ===
- Toady (1989)
- Stitch (1991)
- The Immaculate (1993)
- The Secret of Anatomy (1994)
- Mr Bad Face (1996)
- Longbarrow (1997)
- Genesis (1998)
- Fiddleback (2001)
- Nowhere near an Angel (2005)
- The Deluge (2007)
- It Sustains (2013)
- Zombie Apocalypse: Horror Hospital (2014)
- The Black (2014)
- The Wolves of London (2014)
- The Society of Blood (2015)
- The Wraiths of War (2016)
- The Winter Tree (2018)
- That Which Stands Outside (2023)

=== Novellas ===
- "The Dogs" (2001)
- "The Uglimen" (2003)
- "Stumps" (2008)
- "Albion Fay" (2015)

=== Collections ===
- Close to the Bone (1995)
- Voyages into Darkness (with Stephen Laws)
- Long Shadows, Nightmare Light (2011)
- Wrapped in Skin (2016)
- Warts and All (2020)

=== Novelisations ===
- Dead Island (2011) - Based on the action role-playing survival horror video game and centred on surviving a zombie-infested island.
- Vampire Circus (2012)
- Noah (2014)
- The Great Wall (2017) ISBN 9781785652981
- The Predator (with Christopher Golden) (2018)

=== As editor ===
- Cinema Macabre (2006) - This collection of essays about each contributor's favourite horror film was a limited edition of 200 slipcased copies, signed by all 52 contributors. It won the prestigious British Fantasy Award and nominated for both the Horror Writers Association's Bram Stoker Award and the International Horror Guild Award.
- Cinema Futura: Essays on Favourite Science Fiction Movies (2009)

=== Doctor Who ===
- Wild Blue Yonder
- The Bodysnatchers
- Deep Blue
- Forever Autumn
- Ghosts of India
- False Gods (audio play)
- Plague of the Daleks (audio play)
- Jago and Litefoot Series 2: The Necropolis Express (audio play)
- House of Blue Fire (audio play)
- Moonflesh (audio play)

=== Torchwood ===
- Bay of the Dead

=== Hellboy ===
- The All-Seeing Eye
