= Julie Gardner =

Welsh television producer (born 1969)

Julie Gardner MBE
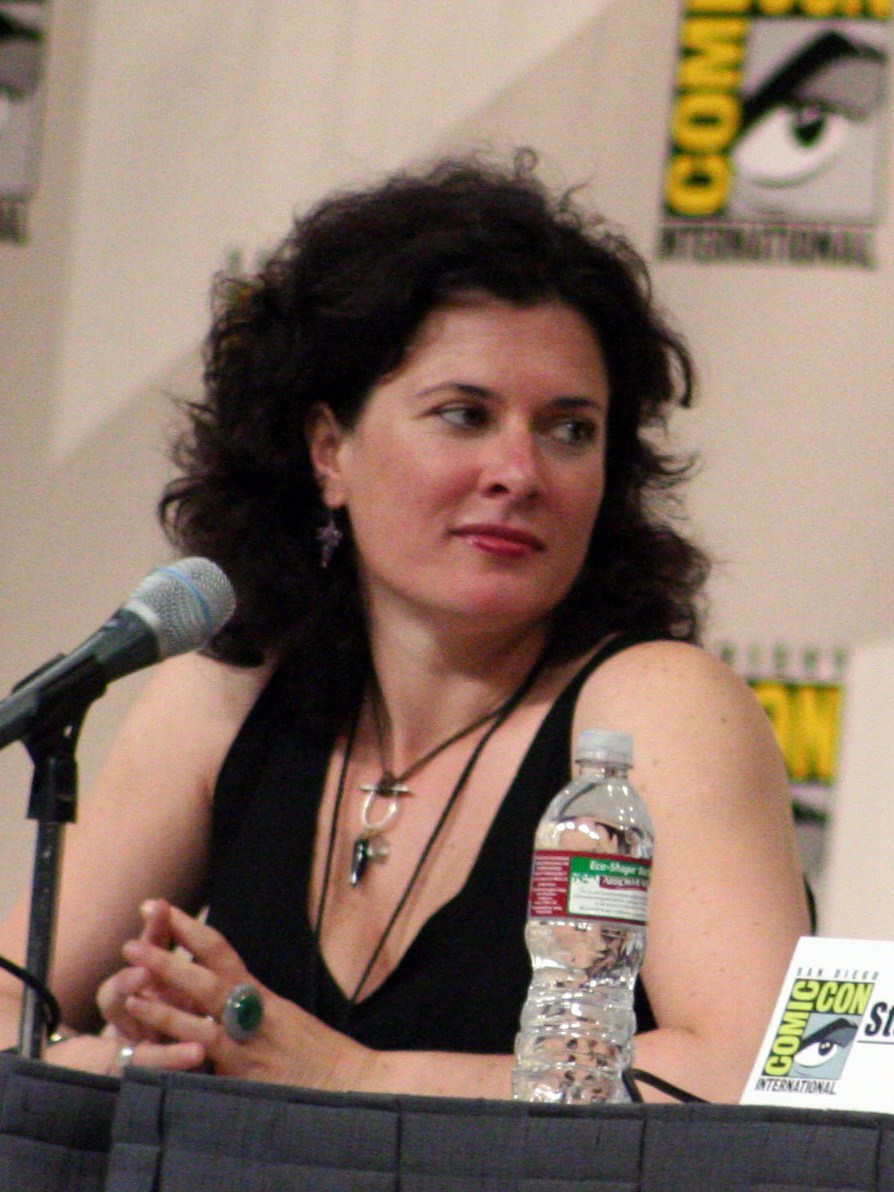
- Gardner at the 2008 San Diego Comic-Con
- Born: Julie Ann Gardner; 4 June 1969 (age 57); Neath, Wales
- Education: Queen Mary University of London
- Occupation: Television producer
- Notable work: Doctor Who; Torchwood; The Sarah Jane Adventures; His Dark Materials
- Spouse: Julian Howarth
- Children: 1

Julie Ann Gardner MBE (born 4 June 1969) is a Welsh television producer. Her most prominent work has been serving as executive producer on the 2005 revival of Doctor Who and its spin-off shows Torchwood and The Sarah Jane Adventures. She worked on Doctor Who from 2003 to 2009 before moving to Los Angeles to work at BBC Worldwide. In 2015, Gardner co-founded the production company Bad Wolf, best known for the BBC TV series His Dark Materials, on which Gardner also serves as an executive producer.

== Early life ==
Gardner was born in Neath and grew up in the Pont Walby area of Glynneath, where her parents ran a local shop. She attended Llangatwg Comprehensive and Neath Port Talbot College, where she was an outstanding student of A-Level English, History and Drama. She read English at Queen Mary University of London and initially worked as a teacher at Rhondda College, now part of Coleg Morgannwg, teaching English at GCSE and A Level, before in the mid-1990s she decided to switch to working in the television industry.

== Television career ==
Her first job was as a producer's secretary on the second production block of the acclaimed BBC Two drama serial Our Friends in the North. Subsequently, she became a script reader and then a script editor, before working as a producer on BBC dramas such as Silent Witness and The Mrs Bradley Mysteries.

In 2000, Gardner began working as a Development Producer at London Weekend Television. She produced dramas including Me and Mrs. Jones and an updated version of Othello written by Andrew Davies and starring Eamonn Walker and Christopher Eccleston (in the Iago role). While at LWT, Gardner began working with Welsh writer Russell T Davies on the period drama Casanova.

In 2003, Gardner returned to the BBC as Head of Drama for BBC Wales, bringing Davies' Casanova project with her. Gardner's first assignment from BBC Head of Drama Jane Tranter was to head up the revival of Doctor Who. Gardner immediately contacted Davies (who had previously expressed an interest in writing and producing Doctor Who) and began working with him on bringing the programme back to British screens. The new series of Doctor Who debuted in March 2005, to critical and popular acclaim.

Gardner was the BBC's representative in the production of the political romantic comedy The Girl in the Café (2005), written by Richard Curtis in conjunction with the Make Poverty History campaign. Other network dramas commissioned by Gardner at BBC Wales included the multiple personality disorder drama May 33rd (2004); domestic abuse-themed one-off Dad (2005); courtroom reconstruction The Chatterley Affair (2006) and the time travel police series Life on Mars (2006–2007), produced independently by Kudos Film & Television.

Gardner and Davies also oversaw three Doctor Who spin-offs: Torchwood, an adult (post-watershed) science fiction drama aired on BBC Three and BBC Two, The Sarah Jane Adventures, a children's fantasy thriller aired on BBC One and CBBC, and Tales of the TARDIS, a companion series available to stream on BBC iPlayer.

In September 2006, it was announced that Gardner would succeed Jane Tranter as the overall Controller of Drama Commissioning at BBC Television, following Tranter's promotion to the new "Head of Fiction" role. However, Gardner remained in her position at BBC Wales, performing the two jobs simultaneously, until 2009; her roles at BBC Wales and with Doctor Who were then assumed by producer Piers Wenger.

Gardner received credit for an increase in drama being made in Wales; in 2007, Cardiff-born writer Andrew Davies called her "the best thing to happen to Welsh drama. Ever."

In March 2009, it was announced that Gardner was to join the staff of Los Angeles-based BBC Worldwide America, as executive producer in charge of scripted projects.

It was announced in late 2009 that Gardner was five months pregnant and her first child, Huckleberry, fathered by Doctor Who sound recordist Julian Howarth, was born in early summer 2010.

In 2015, Gardner cofounded the production company Bad Wolf with Jane Tranter. Bad Wolf has since produced numerous TV series, including The Night Of, His Dark Materials, Industry and Doctor Who.

== Notes ==
Media offices
Preceded by Matthew Robinson	BBC Wales Head of Drama; 2003–2009	Succeeded by Piers Wenger
