= List of Crossroads characters =

Characters from the British soap opera

The British television soap opera Crossroads was broadcast on ATV from 1964 to 1981 and then ITV Central from 1982 to 1988. The only actor to remain for the series' 24-year run was Jane Rossington, who played Jill Richardson/Harvey/Chance, although Susan Hanson, who played Diane Lawton/Parker/Hunter, was present for most of the series' run. Crossroads was later revived and broadcast by ITV franchise holder Carlton Television and ran from 2001 to 2003.

List of Crossroads characters who appeared for two years or more in the series, * = Original Character

- Meg Richardson/Mortimer* – Noele Gordon (1964-1983)
- Jill Richardson/Harvey/Chance* – Jane Rossington (1964–2001)
- Alexander 'Sandy' Richardson* – Roger Tonge (1964–1981)
- Kitty Jarvis* – Beryl Johnstone (1964–1969)
- Dick Jarvis* – Brian Kent (1964–1972)
- Brian Jarvis* – David Fennell (1964–1976)
- Vi Blundell* – Peggy Aitchison (1964–1970)
- Rev Guy Atkins* – Arnold Ridley (1964–1972)
- Hilda Duvene* – Margery Field (1964–1968)
- Anthony Mortimer* – Stephen Whittaker/Jeremy Sinden (1964–1978)
- Les Blundell* – Arthur R. Webb (1964–1966)
- Louise Borelli – Clare Owen (1965–1972)
- Marilyn Gates/Hope – Sue Nicholls/Nadine Hanwell (1965–1972)
- Sgt. Tidmarsh – Norman Mitchell (1965–1974)
- Dr. Derek Maynard – Brian Hankins (1965–1974)
- Sarah Maynard – Diane Holland (1965–1970)
- Andy Fraser – Ian Patterson (1965–1975)
- Ruth Bailey/Fraser – Pamela Greenhall (1965–1975)
- Carlos Raphael – Anthony Morton (1965–1968)
- Josefina Raphael – Gillian Betts (1965–1971)
- Hugh Mortimer – John Bentley (1965–1978)
- Edith Tatum – Elisabeth Croft (1965–1983)
- Amy Turtle – Ann George (1965–1987)
- Janice Gifford/Jarvis – Carolyn Lister (1965–1971)
- Benny Wilmot – Deke Arlon (1965–1967)
- Diane Lawton/Parker/Hunter – Susan Hanson (1966–1987)
- Penny Richardson – Diane Grayson (1966–1968)
- Kevin McArthur – Vincent Ball (1966–1974)
- Dave Cartwright – John Hamill (1966–1974)
- Shirley Perkins – Jacqueline Holborough (1966–1969)
- Archie Gibbs – Jack Haig (1967–1982)
- Tish Hope – Joy Andrews (1967–1980)
- Ted Hope – Charles Stapley (1967–1979)
- Terry Lawton – Denis Gilmore (1967–1985)
- Rev. Peter Hope – Neville Hughes (1968–1972)
- Vince Parker – Peter Brookes (1968–1975)
- Sandra Gould/Stevens - Diane Keen (1968-1971)
- Gerald Lovejoy – William Avenell (1969–1974)
- Rita Witton – Jo Richardson (1969–1976)
- Bruce Sorbell/Richardson – Paul Aston/Michael Walker (1969–1974)
- Bernard Booth – David Lawton (1969–1979)
- David Hunter – Ronald Allen (1969–1985)
- Vera Downend – Zeph Gladstone (1970–1977)
- Stan Harvey – Edward Clayton/Terry Molloy (1970–1987)
- Sheila Harvey/Mollison – Sonia Fox (1970–1976)
- Wilf Harvey – Morris Parsons (1970–1976)
- Sid Gilbert - David Trevena (1970-1973)
- Anne Taylor/Powell – Caroline Dowdswell (1970–1976)
- Rosemary Hunter – Janet Hargreaves (1971–1980)
- Chris Hunter – Freddy Foote/Stephen Hoye (1971–1981)
- Timothy Hunter – Derek Farr (1971–1978)
- Jane Smith – Sally Adcock (1971–1979)
- Gabby Keble – Cheryll Croft (1972-1985)
- Isaac Harvey – Alexander McDonald (1973–1976)
- Cliff Leyton – Johnny Briggs (1973 - 1975)
- Shughie McFee – Angus Lennie (1974–1981)
- Sarah-Jane Harvey – Sorrell Dunger/Joanne Farrell/Holly Newman (1974–2003)
- Carney – Jack Woolgar (1974–1978)
- Jim Baines – John Forgeham (1974–1978)
- Faye Mansfield – Fiona Curzon (1975–1977)
- Avis Tennyson/Warren – Helen Dorward (1975–1977)
- Bob Powell – Maurice Kaufmann (1975–1977)
- Benny Hawkins – Paul Henry (1975–1987)
- Ed Lawton – Thomas Heathcote (1975–1978)
- Angela Kelly – Justine Lord (1975–1977)
- Winnie Plumtree – Hilda Braid (1976–1978)
- Glenda Brownlow/Banks – Lynette McMorrough (1976–1985)
- Kath Brownlow/Fellowes – Hilary Martin/Pamela Vezey (1976–1987)
- Arthur Brownlow – Brian Haines/Peter Hill (1976–1982)
- Muriel Baines – Anne Rutter (1976–1978)
- Dr. John Farnham – Alan Lander (1976–1980)
- Sharon Metcalfe – Carolyn Jones (1977–1984)
- Pat Grogan – Daragh O'Malley (1977–1981)
- Seamus Flynn – Patrick McAlinney (1977–1981)
- Kate Hamilton – Frances White (1977–1983)
- Lucy Hamilton – Jan Todd (1977–1983)
- Richard Lord – Jeremy Mason (1977–1983)
- Gerry Hurst – Stephen Bent (1977–1979)
- Doris Luke – Kathy Staff (1978–2002)
- Dr. Butterworth – Tony Steedman (1978–1980)
- Simone Clavell – Carole Rousseau (1978–1980)
- Dr. Lloyd Munro – Alan Gifford (1978–1980)
- Adam Chance – Tony Adams (1978–2002)
- Victor Lee – Victor Winding (1978–1981)
- Marian Owen – Margaret John (1978–1985)
- PC Steve Cater – Bruce Lidington (1978–1980)
- Joe MacDonald – Carl Andrews (1978–1986)
- Trina Jameson/McDonald – Merdelle Jordine (1978–1982)
- Barbara Brady/Hunter – Sue Lloyd (1979–1985)
- Reg Cotterill – Ivor Salter (1979-1981)
- Alison Cotterill – Carina Wyeth (1979–1984)
- Becky Foster – Maxine Gordon (1979–1981)
- Miranda Pollard – Claire Faulconbridge (1980–1986)
- J. Henry Pollard – Michael Turner (1980–1985)
- Iris Scott – Angela Webb (1980–1985)
- Kevin Banks – David Moran (1980–1985)
- Ron Brownlow – Ian Liston (1980–1985)
- Eddie Lee – Roy Boyd (1980–1983)
- Noel/Reg Lamont – Reginald Marsh (1980–1982)
- Mavis Hooper – Charmain Eyre (1981–1986)
- Percy Dobson - Anthony Woodruff (1981-1983)
- Oliver Banks – Kenneth Gilbert (1981–1983)
- Carole Sands – JoAnne Good (1981–1984)
- Sid Hooper – Stan Stennett (1982–1987)
- Valerie Pollard – Heather Chasen (1982–1986)
- Paul Ross – Sandor Elès (1982–1986)
- Dr. James Wilcox – Robert Grange (1983-1986)
- Anne Marie Wade – Dee Hepburn (1985–1988)
- Nicola Freeman – Gabrielle Drake (1985–1987)
- Daniel Freeman – Philip Goodhew (1985–1988)
- Roy Lambert – Steven Pinder (1985–1988)
- Ivy Meacher/Hooper – Stella Moray (1985–1987)
- Barry Hart – Harry Nurmi (1985–1987)
- Lorraine Baker – Dorothy Brown (1985–1987)
- Mr. Darby – Patrick Jordan (1985–1988)
- Charlie Mycroft – Graham Seed (1986–1988)
- Eileen Tardebigge – Elsie Kelly (1986–1988)
- Fiona Harding – Caroline Evans (1986–1988)
- Tommy Lancaster – Terence Rigby (1986–1988)
- Debbie Lancaster – Kathryn Hurlbutt (1986–1988)
- Kate Russell – Jane Gurnett (2001–2003)
- Jake Booth – Colin Wells (2001–2002)
- Tracey Booth – Cindy Marshall-Day (2001–2003)
- Scott Booth – Keiran Hardcastle/Matthew Maude (2001–2003)
- Billy Taylor – Gilly Gilchrist (2001–2002)
- Virginia Raven – Sherrie Hewson (2001–2003)
- Rocky Wesson – Roger Sloman (2001–2003)
- Beena Shah – Rebecca Hazlewood (2001–2003)

Other well known faces who appeared in Crossroads over the years include David Jason, Larry Grayson, Malcolm McDowell, Elaine Paige, Jimmy Hanley, Barry Evans, Dawn Addams, Jean Kent, Jane Asher, Sherrie Hewson, Anne Charleston, Annette Andre, Duncan Goodhew and Max Wall
