= Susan Hanson =

Actress

- Born: Susan Hanson; 11 February 1943 (age 83); Preston, Lancashire, England, UK
- Occupation: Television actress
- Years active: 1964–1987, 2006–present
- Spouse(s): Tommy Vance (? – ? Divorced); Carl Wayne (1974–2004, his death)
- Children: Jack

Susan Hanson (born 11 February 1943) is an English actress who played the part of Diane Lawton (later Parker and Hunter, and known to Benny and many regulars as "Miss Diane") in the long-running British soap opera Crossroads from 1965–87, when her character was controversially killed off. She also had a brief role in the film Catch Us If You Can, (1965) which starred The Dave Clark Five.

== Early life ==
She attended the independent Woodlands School in Preston, Lancashire and lived on Central Drive in Penwortham.

== Career ==
After a short-lived marriage to BBC Radio 1 DJ Tommy Vance in the 1960s, Hanson married musician Carl Wayne in 1974; they had a son, Jack. After leaving Crossroads she appeared in the film Out of Order (1987), and then remained out of the limelight until her husband died of cancer in 2004. A few years later, she returned to British TV screens in the role of the mother of Todd Carty's character in an episode of Holby City, whilst also appearing in That's What I Call Television, alongside former colleagues Jane Rossington (Jill Chance), Tony Adams (Adam Chance) and Paul Henry (Benny Hawkins).

In November 2009, Hanson made appearances on both The Alan Titchmarsh Show and Loose Women, with each interview giving her the chance to promote Network DVD's new boxset marking Crossroads' 45th anniversary.

In August 2012, it was announced that Hanson had joined the cast of long-running soap opera Coronation Street. Her character, Penny Thornley, began the chain of events leading to the departure of Lewis Archer (Nigel Havers). Hanson played most of her scenes opposite Sue Nicholls (Audrey Roberts), who had previously appeared with Hanson in Crossroads during the mid-1960s as the character Marilyn Gates.

In 2023, Hanson appeared in a cameo role in the ITVX miniseries Nolly, which dramatised the life of her former Crossroads colleague Noele Gordon, and in which Hanson herself was portrayed by Chloe Harris.
