= Armchair Mystery Theatre =

UK television anthology mystery series

- Country of origin: United Kingdom
- No. of episodes: 34 (25 missing)

Production
- Production company: ABC Weekend TV

Original release
- Network: ITV
- Release: 5 June 1960 – 26 September 1965

Related
- Armchair Theatre; Out of This World; Armchair Cinema; Armchair Thriller

Armchair Mystery Theatre is a sixty-minute British television anthology mystery series. Thirty-four episodes aired from 1960–1965. It was hosted by Donald Pleasence and produced by Leonard White. It was a spin-off from the Armchair Theatre series. Guest stars included Edward Woodward, Cyril Cusack, Sam Wanamaker, Ron Moody, Tom Bell, Denholm Elliott, and Sybil Thorndike.

== Archival status ==
A large number of episodes from this series have been junked, out of the thirty-four episodes that were transmitted, twenty-five episodes are missing from the archives and only ten episodes exist as 16mm telerecordings. Two further episodes were additionally made, but not included in the run. "The Cupboard" by Ray Rigby, was originally scheduled for the first series, but was postponed due to a real-life murder case that had similarities to the plot in the episode, that was concurrently being tried in the courts; the episode was eventually transmitted later that year as part of the Armchair Theatre run. Another episode "And Where It Stops" by Alan Seymour, had to be stopped mid-way during filming as they ran out of studio time, producer Leonard White notes "it was a difficult teleplay to tackle and Voytek had designed an extremely complex set. I'd hoped to win the challenge, but not so." A twenty-minute excerpt of the unfinished episode survives as a 2" 405-line videotape copy.

== Episodes ==
=== Series 1 (1960) ===
No. overall	No. in series	Title	Archival Status	Media	Original release date
1	1	"Eye Witness"	Exists	TR16	5 June 1960
Diana Wynyard (Stella Lambert), Paul Daneman (Mark Lambert), Jean Anderson (Meg), Patience Collier (Nurse Miller), Margery Withers (Mrs Evans), Margaret Griffin (Christine), Margaret Stallard (First Nurse), John Morris (Surgeon), Jo Crawford (Second Nurse), Robert Sansom (Doctor Crosbie), Mary Duddy (Ellie), David Stuart (Frank Connors).
2	2	"The Big Wheel"	Missing	N/A	12 June 1960
Sam Wanamaker, Gary Cockrell.
3	3	"The Case of Paul Danek"	Missing	N/A	19 June 1960
Billie Whitelaw (Magda Schiff), Robert Urquhart (Doctor Arens), Gene Anderson (Celia Arens), Edward Woodward (Paul Danek), Edmund Glover (Sergeant), Terry Raven (Mark Arens), Vic Wise (Pawnbroker), Johnny Sekka (Taylor).
4	4	"Flag Fall"	Missing	N/A	26 June 1960
Patrick Barr (Detective Inspector Tanner), Madge Ryan (Maud Cuthbert), Millicent Martin (Flo Bates), Russell Napier (Tom Purvis), June Jago (Mrs Purvis), Ellis Irving (Henry Garrett), Betty Berrell (Peggy Stuart), Beryl Gordon (Phyllis Carter), Shirley Cameron (Beverley Morton), John Fraser (John Ebdon), Leila Blake (Wilma Purvis), David Williams (Bob Stanhope), Stephen Cato (Police Constable Evans), Ray Barrett (Detective Sergeant Cullen), Cyril Renison (Police Doctor), Leslie Wright (Police Constable Thomas), Hana Maria Pravda (Mrs Podolski), Kevin Brennan (TV Commentator), Michael Blakemore (Newscaster).
5	5	"Toffs and Fingers"	Exists	TR16	3 July 1960
Roger Livesey (Toff Mulligan-Hayes), Sophie Stewart (Catriona Cameron), Harold Goodwin (Fingers Higgins), Jameson Clark (Hector), Harry Walker (Ticket Inspector), Robert Dorning (Mr Cooke), Betty Henderson (Grizel Ramsay), Mary Wylie (Annabel Ramsay), Elisabeth Murray (Flora), Eric Woodburn (The Reverend Mr Macquarrie), Vincent Holman (Perkins), Robert Stuart (Bertie Chisholm).
6	6	"Flight from Treason"	Exists	TR16	10 July 1960
John Gregson (Butler), Robert Brown (George Hibberd), Ian Hendry (Harry Walker), Maxwell Shaw (The Thin Man), Avril Elgar (Mary Hibberd), Roger Delgado (Kurt), Robert Bruce (Security Policeman), Reginald Jessup (Workman), Richard Klee (Foreman), Donald Churchill (Robinson), Tom Macaulay (Ferguson), Peter Mayock (Police Constable), John Dawson (Detective Bell), Catherine Dolan (Hotel Receptionist). The episode was remade as The Omega Mystery for Armchair Theatre in 1961.
7	7	"Madeline"	Missing	N/A	17 July 1960
Maurice Denham (Inspector Boileau), Adrienne Corri (Madeleine), Michael Gwynn (Jacques Planchet), Raymond Barry (Martin), Roger Snowdon (Doctor Friant), Roger Williams (Manservant), Peter Stephens (Romain Planchet), Betty England (Louise), Henry Vidon (Doctor Charles), Michael Gwynn (Jonathan Plunket).
8	8	"Web of Deceit"	Missing	N/A	24 July 1960
Jack Hedley (John Stratfold), Margaret Whiting (Bella Warwick), Paul Whitsun-Jones (Monty), Kenneth Mackintosh (Bernard Warwick), Alex Scott (Inspector), Catherine Woodville (Clare), Frank Dunne (Murphy), Dorothy Edwards (Freda), Leonard Cracknell (Reggie), Aithna Gover (Norah).
9	9	"False Witness"	Exists	TR16	7 August 1960
Neil McCallum (Fred Collins), Sylvia Kay (Kitty Morgan), Michael Hitchman (Brother Jones), Robin Ford (Commandant), Gordon Phillott (George), Haydn Ward (Len), Judy Russell (Grace), Violet Gould (Mrs Briggs), Nicholas Amer (Customer), Stanley Meadows (Charlie Gordon), Frank Gatliff (Detective Inspector Gale), Alec Ross (Police Sergeant), Mairhi Russell (Mrs Parsons), Sheelah Wilcocks (Sister Mary Jenkin), Robert Pitt, Max Miradin, Keith Crane, Michael Ely.
10	10	"Machinal"	Missing	N/A	14 August 1960
Donald Pleasence (George H. Jones), Joanna Dunham (Helen), Gary Cockrell (Richard Roe), Sean Sullivan (Prosecution Lawyer), Dennis King (Defence Lawyer), Glenn Williams (Priest), Janet Brandes (Mother), Libby Morris (Nurse), Peter Boretski (Harry Doe), Jo Read (Telephone Girl), James Dyrenforth (Judge).
11	11	"The Man with a Feather in His Hat"	Missing	N/A	21 August 1956
Clifford Evans (Sir Charles Canning, QC), Allan Cuthbertson (Anthony Hurst, QC), Kevin Stoney (Philip Stokes), Wensley Pithey (William Barber), Thomas Heathcote (Superintendent John Gorse), Ronald Adam (Judge), Allan McClelland (Michael Shaw, QC), Delena Kidd (Kate Lehmann), Patricia Salonika (Irene Wilson), Tenniel Evans (Doctor Evans), Harry Walker (Detective Sergeant Dove), Keith Pyott (Judge Walton), Catherine Woodville (Ruth Griffin), John Martin (Caretaker), Stanley Segal (Tudor).
12	12	"Cul de Sac"	Missing	N/A	28 August 1960
Gillian Lind (Miss Frobisher), Tom Bell (Rod Copley), John Sharplin (Inspector Willis), Irene French (Janet Cole), Martin Matthews (Fats Newman), Leslie Wright (Police Constable Simmons), Antony Baird (Sergeant), Michael Deacon (Police Constable Smithson), Basil Beale (Police Constable Martin), Andrew Kane (Police Constable Endean), John Charnley (Police Constable Roberts), Ian White, Royston Tickner, Ronnie Masters, Clive Marshall.
13	13	"The Dummy"	Exists	TR16	4 September 1960
Cyril Cusack (Stan Bracey), Alison Leggatt (May Bracey), Diana King (Mrs Fern), Basil Lord (Charlie Fern), Michael Hitchman (Tom Western), Ernest Hare (Mr Dixon), Norman Mitchell (Bert), Harold Berens (Henry Thomas), John Pike (Boy), Gerald Flood (Detective Sergeant Wells), Anthony Bate (Police Constable Roland).

=== Series 2 (1964) ===
No. overall	No. in series	Title	Archival Status	Media	Original release date
14	1	"Time Out of Mind"	Exists	TR16	19 July 1964
Ian Hendry (Gregory Masters), John Bentley (Turner), Elizabeth Shepherd (Martha Blake), Miranda Connell (Helen Masters), Maurice Good (Peterson), Billy Cornelius (Station Sergeant), Morris Perry (Detective Sergeant Lees).
15	2	"The Blackmailing of Mr. S"	Exists	TR16	26 July 1964
John Le Mesurier (Marcus Sparrow), Peter Vaughan (Sergeant Burtenshaw), Peter Butterworth (Varley), Jo Rowbottom (Angela Dundas), Robert James (Mr Kendrick), Sheila Keith (Miss Tripp), Marcus Hammond (Arnold), Winifred Dennis (Mrs Everley), Graham Squire (The Manager).
16	3	"The Lonely Crime"	Missing	N/A	9 August 1964
John Ronane (Bas), J. G. Devlin (Mr Gregory), Terence Scully (Bob), Marian Spencer (Mrs Morris), June Brown (Linda), Arthur Pentelow (Detective Inspector Armstrong), Robert Arnold (Detective Sergeant Linus), Alethea Charlton (Nora), Peggy Marshall (Mrs Gregory), Bert Palmer (Millington).
17	4	"The Last Coach"	Missing	N/A	16 August 1964
Richard Pearson (Karl Hoffer), Mary Merrall (Countess Anna Christopherson), Donald Eccles (Max Posner), Mike Pratt (Robert Dietrich), Robert James (Conductor), Clive Cleghorn (Ludwig Baum), Janet McIntire (Selina Baum).
18	5	"Admirer at Number Eight"	Missing	N/A	30 August 1964
Diana Churchill (Emily), Gwendolyn Watts (Joan), Bryan Pringle (Mr Plasher), Sean Lynch (Mike), Ronald Wilson (Customer), William Victor (Jeremy), Sally Geeson (Jill), Mitzi Rogers (Daisy Lewis), Ronnie Brody (Ernie Lewis), Janet Rowsell (Customer), Doris Hare (Mrs Prossit), Reg Whitehead (Policeman).
19	6	"You Must Be Virginia"	Missing	N/A	6 September 1964
Richard Johnson (Stephen Canfield), Nigel Stock (Edward Potts), Toby Robins (Virginia Canfield).

=== Series 3 (1965) ===
No. overall	No. in series	Title	Archival Status	Media	Original release date
20	1	"The Last Reunion"	Missing	N/A	9 May 1965
Jeremy Kemp (Hugo, Pilot), Esmond Knight (Simmie, C.O.), Nora Swinburne (Elizabeth, His Wife), Ronald Brandon (Manservant), Robin Hawdon (Johnnie, Navigator), Kenneth Farrington (Ginger, Bomb-Aimer), Bryan Mosley (Dusty, Wireless Operator), Walter Carr (Jock, Flight Engineer), Griffith Davies (Reg, Rear-Gunner), Roger Croucher (Buck, Mid-Upper-Gunner).
21	2	"Licence to Murder"	Missing	N/A	16 May 1965
John Colicos (Ricardo), Paul Maxwell (Murdoch), June Tobin (Laura Foster), Clement McCallin (Lewis Bradwell Foster), Jerry Stovin (Edwin Baker), Robert Arden (Ernest Gowan), Tucker McGuire (Mrs Gertrude Tucker), David Cargill (Clerk of the Court), John McLaren (Lieutenant O'Brien), James Dyrenforth (Judge), Hester Cameron (Christine Foster), Riggs O'Hara (Josef Radewski).
22	3	"The Hunter"	Missing	N/A	6 June 1965
Ronald Fraser (Mr Ridgeway), John Meillon (Malory), Keith Barron (Newman), Camilla Hasse (Mrs Ridgeway), Ann Kennedy (Audrey Malory), David Beale (Inspector Collins).
23	4	"Man and Mirror"	Exists	TR16	13 June 1965
Sybil Thorndike (Mrs Isabel Manners), Denholm Elliott (Geoffrey Manners), Richard Pasco (Edward Manners), Anne Cunningham (Arabella), Thomas Heathcote (Mat Johnson), Constance Chapman (Mrs Lowell), Campbell Singer (Sergeant Cosley), Edwin Apps (Mr Medina), Kathleen Michael (Madge).
24	5	"Time and Mr. Mandingley"	Missing	N/A	27 June 1965
Charles Gray (Madingley), Peter Jeffrey (Prescott), Juliet Harmer (Joanne), John Barron (Inspector France), Ric Hutton (Sergeant Court).
25	6	"The Welcome"	Missing	N/A	4 July 1965
Mark Eden (Tom Braddock), Maureen Pryor (Susannah Glossop), Richard Butler (Bob Glossop), Robert MacLeod (Morris McKinley), Patricia Shakesby (Mary), Fidelma Murphy (Roberta Braddock), Colin Douglas (Carron).
26	7	"The Finishing Touch"	Missing	N/A	18 July 1964
Laurence Hardy (Commander Lynger), Gary Watson (Geoffrey Baxter), Jennie Linden (Claire Pace), Faith Kent (Stella Mitchell), Jane Birkin (Anthea Langridge), Susan Field (Mrs Mercer), David Dodimead (Detective Inspector Gunter), Robert Russell (Sergeant Kent), Nicola Pagett (Marilyn West), Terry Hedley (Girl).
27	8	Missing	N/A	25 July 1965	
Charles Gray (Mr Quill), Brenda Bruce (Ellen), Angela Douglas (Daisy), Stacy Davies (Joe Chandler), Victor Platt (Bunting).
28	9	"The Madam"	Missing	N/A	8 August 1965
Rosalie Crutchley (Anna), Gwen Watford (Paula), Alethea Charlton (Leonie), Paul Williamson (Sandy), Angela Pleasence (Ginny).
29	10	"The Challenge"	Missing	N/A	15 August 1965
Gerald Flood (Philip Henry), Deborah Stanford (Maria Pia), Gabriella Pascoli (Daniela), Simon Gough (Bruno), Moira Redmond (Madame Denver), Stewart Guidotti (Sergio).
30	11	"Wake a Stranger"	Missing	N/A	29 August 1965
Nyree Dawn Porter (Lisa), Edward Woodward (Anstey), Anthony Newlands (Doctor Buchan), Mark Burns (Doctor Gregg), Peter Halliday (Sergeant Powell), Susan Dowdall (Nurse Bennet), Terry Hedley (Telephonist), Harry Littlewood (Taximan), Hannah Gordon (Karen Simons), Delia Corrie (Nurse Palmer), Julian D'Albie (Sir Peter Courville).
31	12	"Charlie Never Warned Us... What a Wild Night This Would Be!"	Missing	N/A	5 September 1965
Ron Moody (Henry Mason), Jack MacGowran (Albert Brady), Fulton Mackay (Ron Ashton).
32	13	"Ask Any Neighbour"	Exists	TR16	12 September 1965
Jack Hedley (Michael Dawson), Ronald Lewis (Joe Kendrick), Barrie Ingham (Martin James), Margaret Whiting (Marj Kendrick), Angela Browne (Linda Dawson).
33	14	"The Stairway"	Missing	N/A	26 September 1965
Bernard Bresslaw (Stephen), Gary Watson (Max), Walter Gotell (the man).
34	15	"Ambrose"	Missing	N/A	26 September 1965
Donald Pleasence (Ambrose), Elizabeth Begley (Adeline), Peter Reeves (Ambrose).
NB	NB	"And Where It Stops"	Exists	VT405	NB
Warren Mitchell (Devenish), Gary Hope (Trumper), Helen Lindsay (Mrs Devenish), Brian Wilde (The Cadaver), Betty Marsden (Madam), Pauline Bott (Xerox), Ann Way (Waitress), Reg Lever (Foreman), Anthony Gardner (Jean-Paul), Anthony Cundell (First Workman), Brian Coburn (Second Workman).
