= Jane Rossington =

British actress (born 1943)

- Born: 5 March 1943 (age 82); Derby, Derbyshire, England
- Occupation: Actress
- Spouse: David Dunger
- Children: 2

Jane Rossington (born 5 March 1943) is a British actress, best known for her role as Jill Richardson/Harvey/Chance in the soap opera Crossroads.

== Early life ==
Born in Derby, Rossington's family moved to Sutton Coldfield when she was four years of age. The daughter of a bank manager, she attended Sutton Coldfield Grammar School and was an amateur actress, having trained in the Rose Bruford College of Speech and Drama, before appearing in repertory theatre in Sheffield and York. She was the only Crossroads original cast member to be in the first and last episode of the series.

== Career ==
Aged 20, she was one of five nurses on Emergency Ward Ten, with Sheila Fearn.

Rossington spoke the first words of the first episode of Crossroads on 2 November 1964, "Crossroads Motel, good evening". She played Jill Richardson, the daughter of the owner of the Crossroads Motel, Meg Richardson. For the 24 years she appeared in the show the writers delighted in making Jill suffer, and amongst other things, she was married five times - once bigamously - was a drug addict, an alcoholic and had a baby with her stepbrother. As well as being the only actor to remain in the show for its entire series, she also spoke the final words of the final episode in 1988.

Because no regular member of the cast of Crossroads had a permanent contract, she had plenty of time to pursue other roles, and played the minor role of Monica Downes in the BBC Radio 4 soap opera The Archers. She was, however, an integral part of Crossroads. When she became pregnant, the show's producer, Reg Watson, ordered the scriptwriters to include the pregnancy in the storyline. When Rossington miscarried, Watson asked her if she would mind if the pregnancy storyline went ahead, as they had had such a positive response from the audience. After agreeing, Rossington conceived again, and in order to not alter the storylines, Jill appeared to be pregnant on screen for 11 months. Jill's daughter, Sarah-Jane, was sometimes played by Rossington's own daughter, Sorrel. After the demise of the original series, Rossington was seen very little on television but frequently appeared on stage. When ITV1 announced in 2000 that the series was to be revived, she returned to the role.

Rossington also appeared in an episode of the children's series Dramarama. For a while, she had her own show on Beacon Radio. She later toured in the stage plays Murder in Mind and Don't Rock the Boat. She has also appeared on Lily Savage's Blankety Blank.

In 2014, she joined fellow Crossroads' cast members on a special edition of Paul O'Grady's BBC Radio 2 show to celebrate the 50th anniversary of the soap. With Tony Adams, Paul Henry and Susan Hanson, Jane recalled some of the highlights from her time working on the hit ATV series.

== In media ==
She was the subject of This Is Your Life in October 1987 when she was surprised by Eamonn Andrews at a central London hotel. In a video interview on YouTube. Rossington stated that she was Eamonn Andrews' final subject on This Is Your Life as he died on 5 November 1987.

In 2023, Rossington was portrayed by Antonia Bernath in the ITVX drama Nolly.

== Personal life ==
She first married Timothy Michael Jones, of Wolverhampton, a director of Crossroads on 30 May 1965 at St Peters church. The marriage lasted around three months.

She married again on Friday 16 June 1972 at All Saints' Church, Four Oaks.

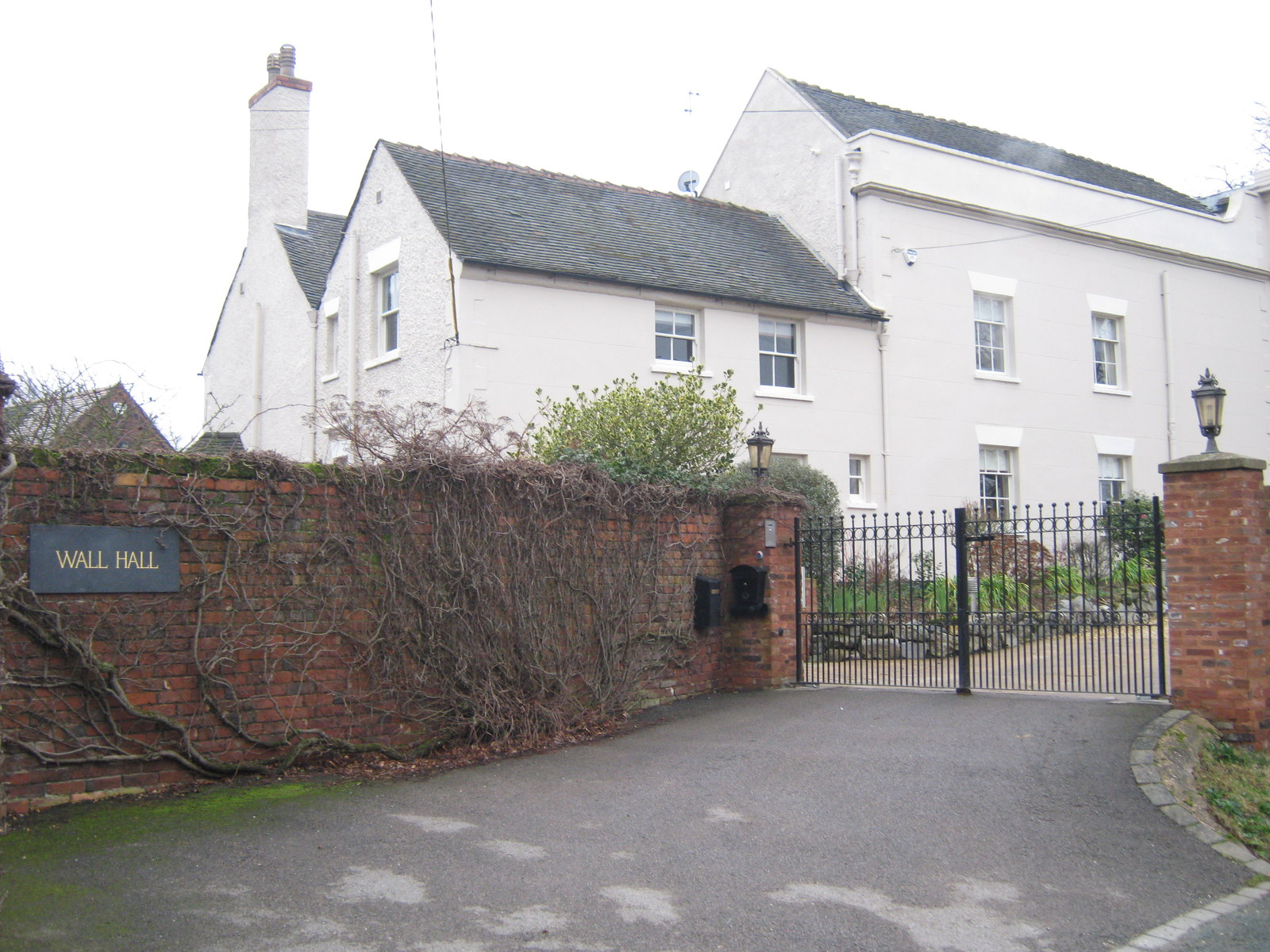
Former home

She moved to Wall Hall in Wall, Staffordshire, and was burgled in late August 1979. She gave birth to a son on 20 July 1978 in Birmingham Maternity Hospital. In 1996 she moved to east Staffordshire.

Rossington now lives in Staffordshire with her second husband, chartered surveyor David Dunger. She has two grown children, Sorrel and Harry.

From 1988, Rossington was the main patron of the original Crossroads Appreciation Society. She renewed her involvement with the fan club in 2002, when under new management it was officially recognised by the programme creators and Carlton Central. In June 2022, Rossington's family revealed that she was suffering from Alzheimer's disease.
