= Kings Oak =

- Crossroads location
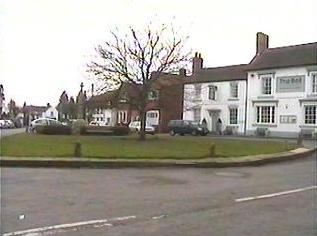
- Tanworth-in-Arden was the original filming location for the fictional village
- Created by: Hazel Adair and Peter Ling
- Genre: Soap opera

In-universe information
- Type: Village
- Characters: Crossroads characters

Kings Oak was the fictional village in the television serial Crossroads which ran on ITV between 1964 and 1988. The show is sometimes written as King's Oak. It was revived in 2001 with the main building being renamed a hotel.

In 2003, halfway through the third comeback series, ratings started to decline, so it was decided to axe the programme for good. The final episode ended on a dream sequence in which one of the characters Angel Samson, played by Jane Asher, had thought up the whole thing. The character was actually working in a supermarket as a checkout operator.

Between 1964 and 1970 most of the scenes of the village were actually all recorded inside the Associated Television Studios in Aston, Birmingham. Still photographs would be used to illustrate Kings Oak and its locations during episodes; places used for these pictures included Bournville, Yardley and Sutton Coldfield.

== Tanworth-in-Arden ==
In 1970 Crossroads' production company, ATV, furnished the serial with the use of an outside broadcast unit to use for a limited number of episodes a year. This enabled filming to take place in and around "Kings Oak" and so a real-life village was sought. Producer Reg Watson picked the Warwickshire village of Tanworth-in-Arden.

Tanworth-in-Arden was used until the programme's end in 1988; the final scene in Crossroads takes place on the village green.

As well as the village centre being used for Kings Oak, other buildings were also transformed for the series. Tanworth-in-Arden's Bell Inn public house became the Running Stag, St Mary's Church was St Lawrence's and the Tanworth Post Office became the Kings Oak version. Other places in the village used for Crossroads include the exterior of the village general store and the railway station.

"Kings Oak" was supposed to be slightly larger than Tanworth, and in later years the production crew also used Bristol Road in Selly Oak as part of the village. This was supposed to be the main shopping front street.

== Village history ==
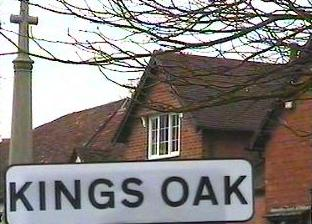
A fake roadsign for the village

Kings Oak, according to a 1964 TV World article on the village, is exactly ten miles south of Birmingham.

The Kings Oak Guidebook, as written by Crossroads' creator Peter Ling, (issued by ATV) brings to light some (fictional) facts about the village:

Originally the Village was called 'Slohtran Ford', which means "marshy ford". The hamlet was originally inhabited by foresters who built their huts at the easiest crossing point for the River Slotter, which runs through the centre of "Kings Oak". The name "Kings Oak" comes from the Civil War, when King Charles hid there for a night in a giant oak tree.

In 1969 the village of Kings Oak had 750 inhabitants and was administered by its own Rural Council. The village has two churches, St Lawrence's and the Methodist Church.

The three mainstay pubs were The Crown, The Kings Oak and The Running Stag.

Other locations in the village include the Fairlawns Hotel, Crossroads Motel, Ravoli Cinema, Robins Warehouse and a small police station. The village has a housing estate called Kings Hill.

There are a couple of nearby towns and villages to "Kings Oak", the biggest is Heathbury - an industrial town, which is six miles north of the village centre. Also Castlewich and Merryfields are located nearby.

== New series ==
In 2001 Crossroads was revived by Carlton Television. Despite many aspects of the original series being dropped from the new version, the name of "Kings Oak" was kept as the location of the Crossroads Hotel; however this Kings Oak looked nothing like its predecessor. The new filming locations were Bingham and its market place. Also Redmile featured as part of the village. Both of the Carlton-used locations are in Nottinghamshire. In an unusual coincidence however, Julia Burchell, who played Nicola Russell in the revived series, comes from Tanworth in Arden, the original filming location.
