= Shut That Door! =

British TV comedy talk show (1972–1974)

- Genre: Comedy
- Written by: Peter Dulay; Bernie Sharp
- Presented by: Larry Grayson
- Theme music composer: Kenny Powell
- Country of origin: United Kingdom
- Original language: English

Production
- Producers: Colin Clews; Peter Dulay
- Running time: 30 minutes
- Production company: ATV

Original release
- Network: ITV
- Release: 1972 – 1974

Related
- The Unforgettable Larry Grayson; The Larry Grayson Show

Shut That Door! is a British comedy talk show hosted by Larry Grayson. Produced from 1972 to 1974, it aired on ATV and was seen in many ITV regions. Only one episode is known to survive in full, featuring Joan Rhodes and Diana Dors, and has been released as part of the Network DVD set Shut That Door – Larry Grayson At ITV, though most of a second episode, featuring Noele Gordon, exists from a black-and-white off-air recording, and has been made available on YouTube by The Transdiffusion Organisation.
