= Margaret Stallard =

British actress (born 1929)

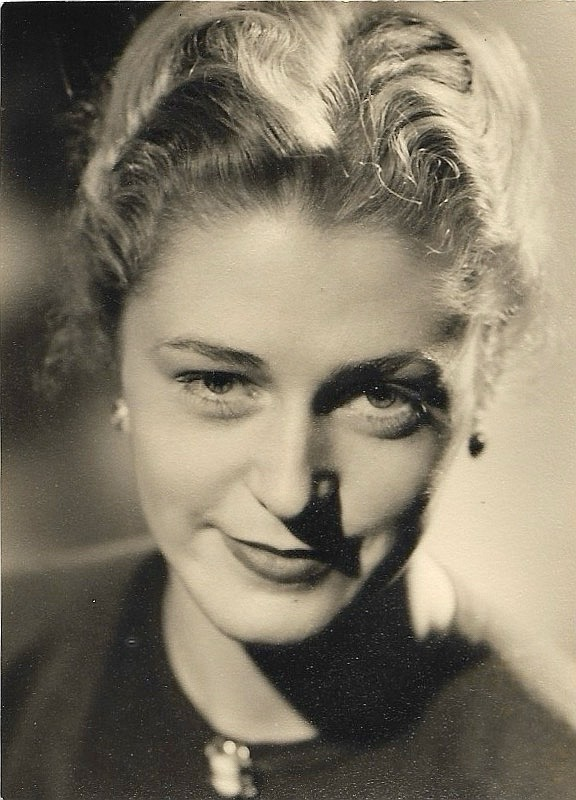
- Born: 30 April 1929 (age 97)
- Occupation: Actress
- Years active: 1944-2013
- Known for: Mrs Babbitt in Crossroads and Grace Tolly in Emmerdale

Margaret Stallard (born 30 April 1929) is a British actress best known for playing Mrs Babbitt in Crossroads and Grace Tolly in Emmerdale.

== Biography ==
Born Margaret Florence Stallard, she is the youngest child of Florence and Norman Stallard.

Stallard's mother was quietly determined that her daughter should follow in the footsteps of her own famous cousin, G. H. Elliott, known to Variety Hall as ‘The Chocolate Coloured Coon’, he was Britain's answer to Al Jolson.

From an early age, Stallard took ballet and tap lessons. During the war years, she entertained the troops as a contortionist. She was extremely flexible and twisted herself into extraordinary positions.

By the time Stallard was 15, she landed a part in Sleeping Beauty the pantomime in Nottingham and she left home in Warwickshire.

She studied at the London Academy of Music and Dramatic Art (L.A.M.D.A.) with the likes of Diana Dors and Pat Coombs, the latter remaining a close friend all her life.

After leaving L.A.M.D.A., she again worked in the chorus for Mae West in Diamond Lil.

Stallard then worked for Donald Wolfit's theatre company and went on tour to Canada with them, where she played many roles including Ophelia.

On returning to England, she was accepted by the Rapier Players in Bristol, a small repertory company that worked at the West of England Little Theatre.

Whilst in Bristol, she met John Davis, a musician, who worked for the West of England Light Orchestra, they married in 1951. A couple of years later, Stallard's first daughter was born. They then moved to Birmingham for a short while, where a second daughter was born.

During this time, Stallard worked in the new emerging medium of television, and had a part in a programme called the Farmers Wife. The family subsequently decided that life would offer them more opportunities in London.

Stallard continued to work in Repertory Theatres all around the country including Frinton, York, Hornchurch and Bromley. She had starring roles in Steaming, A Taste of Honey and Once a Catholic.

In 1955, she starred in The Farmer's Wife as Sibley Sweetland, her first TV role.

In 1965, she gave birth to twins, a daughter Miranda (Mimi) and Ben Davis, a cellist and again her life and career path changed. It was no longer possible in those days to continue to tour, but Stallard was fortunate to pick up TV and commercial work.

In 1990, she starred as the Aunt in Sir Courtly Nice at the Young Vic Studio.

In the later years of her life, Stallard has focussed on writing plays. She has written a one-woman play about Hester Thrale, a diarist in the time of Samuel Johnson. She performed this in Garrick's Temple in Hampton and again at Dr Johnson's House in the City of London.

== Filmography ==
Year	TV show/film	Episode	Character
2013	Call the Midwife	2.4	Mrs Giddings
1988–2012	Casualty	"When Love Breaks Down" (2012), "A Quiet Night" (1988)	Mrs Green (2012), Mrs Woods (1988)
2012	Starlings	1.2	"Art Fair Lady"
2011	The Cafe	"Out with the Old"	Grockle 1
2002-2009	Doctors	"Gone to the Dogs" (2009), "Hoodie" (2007), "Golden Years" (2002)	Radio Caller (2009), Harriet Gladstone (2007), Jean Burton (2002)
2008	Sidney Turtlebaum (short film)	n/a	Elderly Woman
1995	Strange But True?	Dowsing/Near Death Experience	Reconstruction Cast
1988–1994	The Bill	"Land of the Blind" (1994), "With Intent" (1991), "Start with the Whistle" (1990), "Witness" (1988)	Magistrate (1994), Magistrate (1991), Magistrate (1990), Chairwoman (1988)
1991	Screen Two	Fellow Traveller	Production Assistant
1988–1989	First of the Summer Wine	"Quiet Wedding" (1989), "Snuff and Stuff" (1988)	Mrs Scrimshaw (1988 and 1989)
1988	Blind Justice	Crime and Punishment	Usher
1988	Crossroads	Whole series	Mrs Babbitt
1985–1986	Last of the Summer Wine	"Set the People Free" (1986), "Who's Looking After the Cafe Then?" (1985)	Wife (1986 and 1985)
1986	Lovejoy	"To Sleep No More"	Mrs Wendell
1982	On the Line	1.12	Woman shopper
1981	The Bagthorpe Saga	"Absolute Zero - Part 2" (1981), "Ordinary Jack - Part 2" (1981)	Telegraph lady
1980	Angels	6.23, 6.21	SEN Grace Baldwin
1980	Juliet Bravo	"Shot Gun"	Madge Maskell
1980	Emmerdale	1.568, 1.569, 1.570, 1.571, 1.572, 1.641, 1.642, 1.643, 1.644, 1.645, 1.646, 1.647, 1.648, 1.718, 1.719, 1.720	Grace Tolly
1980	Grange Hill	3.7	Mrs Conrad
1963	The Scales of Justice	The Undesirable Neighbour	Mrs Brooks
1963	Compact	"Merely Players"	Dot
1961	Deadline Midnight	"Man in a Frame"	Nurse
1960	Armchair Mystery Theatre	"Eye Witness"	First Nurse
1955	The Farmer's Wife	TV movie	Sibley Sweetland
