= Larry Grayson =

English comedian & television presenter (1923–1995)

- Larry Grayson on The Generation Game
- Born: William Sulley White; 31 August 1923; Banbury, Oxfordshire, England
- Died: 7 January 1995 (aged 71); Nuneaton, Warwickshire, England
- Resting place: Oaston Road Cemetery, Nuneaton, Warwickshire, England
- Notable work: The Generation Game

Comedy career
- Years active: 1937–1994

Larry Grayson (born William Sulley White; 31 August 1923 – 7 January 1995) was an English comedian and television presenter. He hosted the BBC's Saturday-night peak-time TV game show The Generation Game in the late 1970s and early 1980s, employing his high-camp, English music hall humour.

His camp stand-up act consisted mainly of anecdotes about a cast of imaginary friends including Everard, Apricot Lil, Slack Alice and Pop-it-in Pete the Postman. A museum in his home town Nuneaton documents his life and work, and a memorial has been established.

== Biography ==
Grayson was born William Sulley White in Banbury, Oxfordshire, in 1923. His parents were unmarried and he never met his father. When Grayson was ten days old, his mother, Ethel White, arranged for him to be fostered by Alice and Jim Hammonds in Nuneaton, Warwickshire. He had two foster sisters, Flo and Mary. His foster mother Alice died when he was six years old, and he was brought up by his foster sister Flo, with whom he lived for much of his life. It has been reported that his birth mother stayed in touch with the family and was known to Grayson as Aunt Ethel, until he discovered her true identity when he was eight years old. He was never formally adopted.

Grayson's sexuality was the subject of much speculation, and while he never publicly came out as gay, his unpublished memoirs discuss his sexuality. He recounted how his "one true love" had been his best friend from school days, Tom Proctor, who was killed at age 21 at the Battle of Monte Cassino during the Second World War. Grayson said he never got over this loss, and he is not known to have had any other significant relationships (albeit one biographer recalls "a brief smokescreen" when he was said to be engaged to Crossroads actress Noele Gordon).

Homosexual acts between men were illegal in England and Wales until the 1967 Sexual Offences Act (when Grayson was 44), and even after that, coming out as gay would have damaged his television career. During his life Grayson was targeted by gay-rights campaigners who picketed his shows calling for him to be open about his sexuality, while the Gay Liberation Front also protested against his stereotypical camp portrayals of gay men for comedic purposes. Grayson's biographer, Tony Nicholson, observes: "...many gay people acknowledge how important his contribution to camp culture was, and how his mass popularity did perhaps help spearhead greater acceptance of the LGBT community."

== Early career ==
Grayson left school at the age of 14 and began working professionally as a supporting drag act on the comedy club circuit. He initially used the stage name Billy Breen, but changed it to Larry Grayson in the 1950s on the advice of his agent. While the origin of the name Larry is unknown, his management at the time felt a two-syllable first name would be more memorable and go better with the surname Grayson.

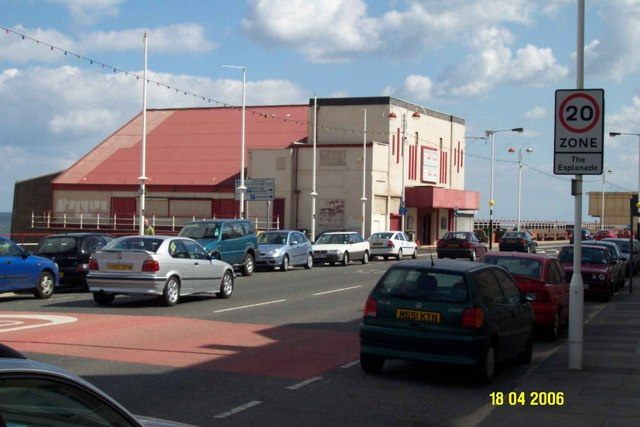
Regent Cinema, Redcar, where Grayson coined his catchphrase, "Shut that door!"

Over the next 30 years he toured the UK in male revues and drag shows, as well as in variety shows at venues including working men's clubs, regional theatres and the Metropolitan in London. He also added stand-up comedy to his act and developed a gentle anecdotal style of comedy. It was usually based around his various imaginary friends such as Everard, Apricot Lil, Slack Alice, milkman Sterilised Stan, window cleaner Peek-a-boo Pete with his dirty chamois and the postman Pop-It-In Pete. A lot of his material was observational. In his early years, Grayson's family had the only telephone in the street, and his inspiration came from overhearing his neighbours using it. The "imaginary friends" were in fact based on local characters: for example, Apricot Lil worked at the local jam factory.

While he performed as Billy Breen at the New Pavilion Theatre Redcar (now the Regent Cinema) he first used what became his familiar catchphrase "shut that door" when a side door had been left open causing a cold breeze to blow across the stage straight from the sea. During this period, Grayson was briefly managed by Eve Taylor, who renamed him Larry Grayson and is credited with being the source of the phrase, as several of her clients revealed that whenever she wanted to discuss money or personal issues with her clients she would always tell them to "shut that door". Taylor struggled to find him the right opportunities and they parted, and Grayson became a client of Michael Grade.

== Television career ==
An early TV appearance in the 1950s had led to complaints about his act being too outrageous, and Grayson had resigned himself to a career off television. Then in the early 1970s his club act was seen by Michael Grade, then an agent, who signed him. Following several successful appearances in ATV variety shows, Grade's uncle, impresario Lew Grade, gave Grayson a contract to front a show, Shut That Door! (1972), and slightly later, the Larry Grayson Show.

In 1974 he released the single Just Another Pretty Face on Pye Records.

Grayson also made two cameo appearances in the Midlands-based soap opera Crossroads, as a flouncing, difficult customer at the Crossroads Motel and as the chauffeur at the wedding of Meg Richardson, played by his close friend Noele Gordon. In real life Grayson could not drive. He also made a number of guest appearances in variety shows, chat shows and panel games.

=== The Generation Game ===
Grayson's popularity peaked when he was hired by the BBC to present the Saturday night show The Generation Game in 1978, as the replacement for Bruce Forsyth. The show was successful, once attracting an audience of 25 million (due to a strike at ITV) at its peak. Grayson was assisted by his co-star Isla St Clair, whom he frequently referred to as "my lovely Isla".

Despite its popularity, by 1981 The Generation Game was being overtaken in the ratings by ITV's rival show Game for a Laugh. Grayson decided to leave The Generation Game in 1982 while it was still relatively successful, in the expectation that the BBC would offer him another high-profile Saturday night show; this did not materialise.

== Later life ==
Grayson went into unintentional semi-retirement, living alone at his house in Nuneaton with his pet dogs, although he did return to television to present the game show Sweethearts for ITV in 1987. He made a number of other TV appearances and radio broadcasts, including the Tom O'Connor-hosted TV quiz show A Question of Entertainment, where he was one of the team captains in 1988. Grayson moved with his adoptive older sister Flo to Torquay, Devon, where they lived in separate neighbouring bungalows, during his semi-retirement, but moved back to Nuneaton after two years when he became bored and missed his close family and friends.

== Death ==
Grayson made his final public appearance on 3 December 1994 at the Royal Variety Performance. During this performance he referred to his hiatus from television by commenting to the audience, "They thought I was dead!". Appropriately, his last words to the audience were his catchphrase, "Shut that door".

On New Year's Eve 1994, Grayson was rushed into hospital with a perforated appendix. He was discharged from hospital, but died on 7 January 1995 in Nuneaton, at age 71. He was buried alongside other members of his family at Oaston Road Cemetery in his hometown of Nuneaton.

=== Obituaries ===
Journalist Suzi Pritchard wrote in The Guardian:

His camp, deliciously naughty humour was never crude or vulgar. The gentle ambivalence of his humour made him attractive to an extraordinarily diverse range of people. But his real appeal was that of a valued neighbour perceptively observing the details of everyday life and commenting on it across the garden fence, creating an emotional intimacy in a society starting to fragment."

Ken Dodd, a fellow comedian, said of Grayson:

He loved everybody and he wanted them to love him in return and yes, they did, they all loved Larry.

== In popular culture ==
In the 2023 ITVX miniseries Nolly, which dramatised the life of his friend and former Crossroads colleague Noele Gordon, Grayson was portrayed by Mark Gatiss.

In 2025 a one-man play about Grayson's life and work, What a Gay Day, was premiered at the Bridge House Theatre in Penge and subsequently toured. The script was written by Tim Connery and performed by Luke Adamson.

== Television appearances ==
- Camera One, 1956 – one of the acts in a televised variety show from the King's Theatre, Hammersmith.
- Saturday Variety, 1971 – television show appearances.
- The Leslie Crowther Show, 1971 – television show appearances.
- This Is Your Life - subject.
- Saturday Variety, 1972 – television show appearances.
- Shut That Door!, 1972–1974 – television show host.
- Crossroads, 1973 – guest appearance on the Boxing Day episode as an irate customer.
- Sunday Night at the London Palladium, 1973 – television show appearances.
- The Larry Grayson Hour of Stars, 1974 — television show host.
- Look Who's Talking, 1974 – television show appearances.
- The Larry Grayson Show, 1975–1977 television show host.
- Crossroads, 1975 – guest appearance as the chauffeur of the wedding car in the episode when Meg married Hugh Mortimer.
- The Good Old Days, 1976–1983 – various appearances in televised music-hall variety show.
- Larry Grayson's Generation Game, 1978–1982 – television game show host (72 episodes).
- At Home with Larry Grayson, 1983 – television show host.
- Late Night Larry, 1983 – radio music show host.
- Sweethearts, 1987 – television panel game host.
- A Question of Entertainment, 1988 – Quiz show team leader
- Royal Variety Performance, 1994 - performer. Final public appearance.

== DVD release ==
- In 2009, Network DVD released a three disc set Shut That Door – Larry Grayson At ITV, which features material from his ITV days, including the one existing episode of his series Shut That Door and both series of The Larry Grayson Show.

== Authorship ==
- 'Larry Grayson's Parlour Fun Book', 1980 (Hamlyn (publisher)) ISBN 9780600202349
- 'Grayson's War', 1983 (Macmillan Publishers London) ISBN 0-333-35949-6

Preceded by Bruce Forsyth	Host of The Generation Game; 1978–82	Succeeded by Bruce Forsyth (in 1990)
