= Elisabeth Croft =

English actress (1907–2003)

- Born: 22 September 1907; Windermere, Cumberland, England
- Died: 13 January 2003 (aged 95); London, England
- Other name: Elizabeth Croft
- Occupation: Actress
- Years active: 1940–84
- Notable work: See below
- Television: Crossroads

Elisabeth Croft (22 September 1907 – 13 January 2003) was an English actress, known for playing Edith Tatum in the ITV soap opera Crossroads.

She is not to be confused with another English actress, Elizabeth Croft.

== Personal life ==
Croft was born on 22 September 1907 in Windermere. Withdrawn as a child, she nonetheless chose to be an actress. In the 1930s she landed roles in repertory theatre and co-starred with Seymour Hicks in Vintage Wine in the Daly's Theatre, 1934. She was married and had a son and a daughter. Croft died on 13 January 2003; on that day a new version of Crossroads was released.

== Career ==
"It was very amateur when I went into it. We were doing five episodes a week and didn't get as much rehearsal time as we would have liked, so we had to be prepared."

— Croft describes Crossroads (2000)

In 1966, Croft landed her first television role, a part in the ITV soap opera Crossroads, playing Miss Tatum. The soap originally featured actress Beryl Johnstone as postmistress Kitty Jarvis, sister of the series lead, motel owner Meg Richardson (Noele Gordon). Following Johnstone's death in 1969, the role of Miss Tatum was increased and she was coaxed from her life as a recluse and took over the running of the shop from Kitty, becoming one of the show's leading peripheral characters as the location increasingly became a focal point in stories. Croft later summed up her character: "Miss Tatum didn't suffer fools gladly and was a bit sharp at times, but she was a wonderful character". The role of Miss Tatum was quietly phased out following producer Reg Watson's departure. Croft left the series by 1979. Croft said of the show, "I suppose you would call it a quiet, humdrum show".

In 1940, Croft began working for Royal Shakespeare Company, Stratford-upon-Avon. She appeared in many plays whilst there, such as Romeo and Juliet and The Merry Wives of Windsor. She appeared in the Armchair Thriller production The Limbo Connection. Her last appearance in television was in the BAFTA award winning The Dress in 1984, her last role before a long retirement. Whilst in the cast for The Dress, it won a BAFTA award in 1984.

== Filmography ==
Television

Year	Title	Role	Notes
1965	The Wars of the Roses	Richard III, Edward IV, Henry VI	3 episodes
1966–79, 1983	Crossroads	Miss Tatum	Series regular
1971	Crossroads: A Celebration	Miss Tatum	Herself
1976	Within These Walls	Agatha Mason	1 episode
1978	Armchair Thriller	Mrs. Sangster	1 episode
1981	BBC2 Playhouse	Neighbour	1 episode
1985	Crossroads Revisited	Herself	TV documentary
1994	Crossroads: 30 Years On	Herself	TV documentary

Film

Year	Title	Role
1984	The Dress	Old Lady

Stage/Theatre

Year	Title	Role
1934	Vintage Wine	Minor Role
1940	Romeo and Juliet	Nurse
1940	The Merry Wives of Windsor	Mistress Quickly
1964	Henry IV Part 1	Various Roles
