= Nolly (TV series) =

2023 British biographical miniseries

- Genre: Biographical drama
- Created by: Russell T Davies
- Written by: Russell T Davies
- Directed by: Peter Hoar
- Starring: Helena Bonham Carter
- Composer: Blair Mowat
- Country of origin: United Kingdom
- Original language: English
- No. of episodes: 3

Production
- Executive producers: Russell T Davies; Peter Hoar; Nicola Shindler
- Producer: Karen Lewis
- Production companies: Quay Street Productions; ITV Studios

Original release
- Network: ITVX
- Release: 2 February 2023

Nolly is a British three-part biographical television miniseries created by Russell T Davies, starring Helena Bonham Carter as Crossroads star Noele Gordon. The series tracks the success of the television star Noele "Nolly" Gordon and her sudden firing from Crossroads.

The series premiered on 2 February 2023, on the streaming platform ITVX. It was later broadcast on ITV1 from 27 - 29 December 2023.

== Cast ==
- Helena Bonham Carter as Noele Gordon
- Max Brown as Michael Summerton
- Antonia Bernath as Jane Rossington
- Bethany Antonia as Poppy Ngomo
- Mark Gatiss as Larry Grayson
- Emily Butcher as Fiona Fullerton
- Augustus Prew as Tony Adams
- Richard Lintern as Ronald Allen
- Chloe Harris as Susan Hanson
- Tom Bell as Rodney
- Clare Foster as Sue Lloyd
- Lloyd Griffith as Paul Henry
- Con O'Neill as Jack Barton
- John Mackay as John Logie Baird
- Tim Wallers as Charles Denton
- Boro' Brass as the Brass Band on the docks

== Production ==
Nolly was the debut commission for Nicola Shindler's ITV-backed Quay Street Productions. In November 2021, it was announced Helena Bonham Carter would star as Noele Gordon. In June 2022, it was announced Augustus Prew would play Tony Adams and Mark Gatiss would play Larry Grayson. Also joining the cast were Richard Lintern, Antonia Bernath, Bethany Antonia, Clare Foster, Chloe Harris, Lloyd Griffith, Con O'Neill and Tim Wallers.

Principal photography took place in and around Manchester. In May 2022, Bonham Carter was spotted filming at Salford Lads' Club in Ordsall. Cast and crew were then spotted in Bolton at Le Mans Crescent.

== Episodes ==
No.	Title	Directed by	Written by	Original release date	UK viewers (millions)
1	Episode 1	Peter Hoar	Russell T Davies	2 February 2023	N/A
Noele Gordon has been the star of ITV's flagship soap Crossroads as motel owner Meg Mortimer... but in 1981, at the height of her fame, she is axed.
2	Episode 2	Peter Hoar	Russell T Davies	2 February 2023	N/A
With her exit from Crossroads looming, Nolly is desperate to know how she is going to be written out, and fears that her character Meg might die.
3	Episode 3	Peter Hoar	Russell T Davies	2 February 2023	N/A
To save her career, Nolly returns to the stage in one of theatre’s hardest roles. Riddled with self-doubt, can she prove her detractors wrong?

== Release ==
ITV shared a first look at Bonham Carter in costume in June 2022.

It was broadcast in the US on PBS as part of their Masterpiece series, premiering on 17 March 2024.

=== Critical reception ===
On Rotten Tomatoes, 100% of 14 critic reviews are positive, with an average rating of 7.7/10. The critics consensus states, "Enlivened by Helena Bonham Carter's barnburner performance and Russell T. Davies' delicious dialogue, Nolly gives a fallen star her joyous closeup." On Metacritic, it has an average rating of 79 out of 100 based on nine critic reviews, indicating "generally favorable reviews".

== Doctor Who crossover ==
In October 2023, Davies confirmed that the 60th anniversary specials of Doctor Who would feature an "in-universe crossover" while emphasising that the events of the show would be considered "truly canonical". The episode titled "The Giggle" included John Mackay as John Logie Baird, the man who put Gordon on television, with a particular focus on Baird's initial transmissions using Stooky Bill.

== Accolades ==
Davies won Best Writer at the 2023 BAFTA Cymru Awards, and Bonham Carter was nominated for Best Actress at the 2024 British Academy Television Awards.
