= List of General Hospital (British TV series) episodes =

This is a list of episodes to the British daytime soap opera General Hospital that ran for 6 series from 1972 to 1979 for 340 episodes. The first series ran for 270 twice-weekly 30 minutes episodes, episodes from series 2 onwards ran for 60 minutes. 231 episodes are missing from series 1 as well as episode 12 "Killer at Large" from series 6, 21 surviving colour episodes now exist in black and white.

== Series overview ==
Series	Episodes	Originally released	
Series	Episodes	First released	Last released
1	270	19 October 1972	28 May 1975
2	13	18 July 1975	10 October 1975
3	20	4 June 1976	15 October 1976
4	13	27 May 1977	19 August 1977
5	12	2 December 1977	24 February 1978
6	12	3 November 1978	26 January 1979

== Episodes ==
=== Series 1 (1972–75) ===
No. overall	No. in Series	Original Broadcast Date	Archive Status
1	1	19 October 1972	Exists (PAL 2" colour videotape)
2	2	20 October 1972	Exists (PAL 2" colour videotape)
3	3	26 October 1972	Exists (16mm black and white telerecording)
4	4	27 October 1972	Exists (PAL 2" colour videotape)
5	5	2 November 1972	Missing
6	6	3 November 1972	Exists (16mm black and white telerecording)
7	7	9 November 1972	Exists (16mm black and white telerecording)
8	8	10 November 1972	Exists (16mm black and white telerecording)
9	9	16 November 1972	Exists (16mm black and white telerecording)
10	10	17 November 1972	Exists (16mm black and white telerecording)
11	11	23 November 1972	Exists (16mm black and white telerecording)
12	12	24 November 1972	Exists (16mm black and white telerecording)
13	13	30 November 1972	Exists (16mm black and white telerecording)
14	14	1 December 1972	Missing (sound exists)
15	15	7 December 1973	Exists (16mm black and white telerecording)
16	16	8 December 1972	Exists (16mm black and white telerecording)
17	17	14 December 1972	Exists (16mm black and white telerecording)
18	18	15 December 1972	Exists (16mm black and white telerecording)
19	19	21 December 1972	Exists (16mm black and white telerecording)
20	20	22 December 1972	Exists (16mm black and white telerecording)
21	21	28 December 1972	Exists (16mm black and white telerecording)
22	22	29 December 1972	Exists (16mm black and white telerecording)
23	23	4 January 1973	Exists (16mm black and white telerecording)
24	24	5 January 1973	Exists (16mm black and white telerecording)
25	25	11 January 1973	Exists (16mm black and white telerecording)
26	26	12 January 1973	Exists (16mm black and white telerecording)
27	27	18 January 1973	Missing
28	28	19 January 1973	Missing
29	29	25 January 1973	Exists (PAL 2" colour videotape)
30	30	26 January 1973	Missing
31	31	1 February 1973	Missing
32	32	2 February 1973	Exists (PAL 2" colour videotape)
33	33	8 February 1973	Missing
34	34	9 February 1973	Missing
35	35	15 February 1973	Missing
36	36	16 February 1973	Missing
37	37	22 February 1972	Missing
38	38	23 February 1973	Missing
39	39	1 March 1973	Missing
40	40	2 March 1973	Missing
41	41	8 March 1973	Missing
42	42	9 March 1973	Missing
43	43	15 March 1973	Missing
44	44	16 March 1973	Missing
45	45	22 March 1973	Missing
46	46	23 March 1973	Missing
47	47	29 March 1973	Missing
48	48	30 March 1973	Missing
49	49	5 April 1973	Missing
50	50	6 April 1973	Missing
51	51	12 April 1973	Missing
52	52	13 April 1973	Missing
53	53	19 April 1973	Missing
54	54	20 April 1973	Missing
55	55	26 April 1973	Missing
56	56	27 April 1973	Missing
57	57	3 May 1973	Missing
58	58	4 May 1973	Missing
59	59	10 May 1973	Missing
60	60	11 May 1973	Missing
61	61	17 May 1973	Missing
62	62	18 May 1973	Missing
63	63	24 May 1973	Missing
64	64	25 May 1973	Missing
65	65	31 May 1973	Missing
66	66	1 June 1973	Missing
67	67	7 June 1973	Missing
68	68	8 June 1973	Missing
69	69	14 June 1973	Missing
70	70	15 June 1973	Missing
71	71	21 June 1973	Missing
72	72	22 June 1973	Missing
73	73	28 June 1973	Missing
74	74	29 June 1973	Missing
75	75	5 July 1973	Missing
76	76	6 July 1973	Missing
77	77	12 July 1973	Missing
78	78	13 July 1973	Missing
79	79	19 July 1973	Missing
80	80	20 July 1973	Missing
81	81	26 July 1973	Missing
82	82	27 July 1973	Missing
83	83	2 August 1973	Missing
84	84	3 August 1973	Missing
85	85	9 August 1973	Missing
86	86	10 August 1973	Missing
87	87	16 August 1973	Missing
88	88	17 August 1973	Missing
89	89	23 August 1973	Missing
90	90	24 August 1973	Missing
91	91	30 August 1973	Missing
92	92	31 August 1973	Missing
93	93	6 September 1973	Missing
94	94	7 September 1973	Missing
95	95	13 September 1973	Missing
96	96	14 September 1973	Missing
97	97	20 September 1973	Missing
98	98	21 September 1973	Missing
99	99	27 September 1973	Missing
100	100	28 September 1973	Exists (PAL 2" colour videotape)
101	101	4 October 1973	Missing
102	102	5 October 1973	Missing
103	103	11 October 1973	Missing
104	104	12 October 1973	Missing
105	105	18 October 1973	Missing
106	106	19 October 1973	Missing
107	107	25 October 1973	Missing
108	108	26 October 1973	Missing
109	109	1 November 1973	Missing
110	110	2 November 1973	Missing
111	111	8 November 1973	Missing
112	112	9 November 1973	Missing
113	113	15 November 1973	Missing
114	114	16 November 1973	Missing
115	115	22 November 1973	Missing
116	116	23 November 1973	Missing
117	117	29 November 1973	Missing
118	118	30 November 1973	Missing
119	119	6 December 1973	Missing
120	120	7 December 1973	Missing
121	121	13 December 1973	Missing
122	122	14 December 1973	Missing
123	123	20 December 1973	Missing
124	124	21 December 1973	Missing
125	125	27 December 1973	Missing
126	126	28 December 1973	Exists (PAL 2" colour videotape)
127	127	3 January 1974	Missing
128	128	4 January 1974	Missing
129	129	10 January 1974	Missing
130	130	11 January 1974	Missing
131	131	17 January 1974	Missing
132	132	18 January 1974	Missing
133	133	24 January 1974	Missing
134	134	25 January 1974	Missing
135	135	31 January 1974	Missing
136	136	1 February 1974	Missing
137	137	7 February 1974	Missing
138	138	8 February 1974	Missing
139	139	14 February 1974	Missing
140	140	15 February 1974	Missing
141	141	21 February 1974	Missing
142	142	22 February 1974	Missing
143	143	28 February 1974	Missing
144	144	1 March 1974	Missing
145	145	7 March 1974	Missing
146	146	8 March 1974	Missing
147	147	14 March 1974	Missing
148	148	15 March 1974	Missing
149	149	21 March 1974	Missing
150	150	22 March 1974	Missing
151	151	28 March 1974	Missing
152	152	29 March 1974	Missing
153	153	4 April 1974	Missing
154	154	5 April 1974	Missing
155	155	11 April 1974	Missing
156	156	12 April 1974	Missing
157	157	18 April 1974	Missing
158	158	19 April 1974	Missing
159	159	25 April 1974	Missing
160	160	26 April 1974	Missing
161	161	2 May 1974	Missing
162	162	3 May 1974	Missing
163	163	9 May 1974	Missing
164	164	10 May 1974	Missing
165	165	16 May 1974	Missing
166	166	17 May 1974	Missing
167	167	23 May 1974	Missing
168	168	24 May 1974	Missing
169	169	30 May 1974	Missing
170	170	31 May 1974	Missing
171	171	6 June 1974	Missing
172	172	7 June 1974	Missing
173	173	13 June 1974	Missing
174	174	14 June 1974	Missing
175	175	20 June 1974	Missing
176	176	21 June 1974	Missing
177	177	27 June 1974	Missing
178	178	28 June 1974	Missing
179	179	4 July 1974	Missing
180	180	5 July 1974	Missing
181	181	11 July 1974	Missing
182	182	12 July 1974	Missing
183	183	18 July 1974	Missing
184	184	19 July 1974	Missing
185	185	25 July 1974	Missing
186	186	26 July 1974	Missing
187	187	1 August 1974	Missing
188	188	2 August 1974	Missing
189	189	8 August 1974	Missing
190	190	9 August 1974	Missing
191	191	15 August 1974	Missing
192	192	16 August 1974	Missing
193	193	22 August 1974	Missing
194	194	23 August 1974	Missing
195	195	29 August 1974	Missing
196	196	30 August 1974	Incomplete (sequences exist from off air recording)
197	197	5 September 1974	Missing
198	198	6 September 1974	Missing
199	199	12 September 1974	Missing
200	200	13 September 1974	Missing
201	201	19 September 1974	Missing
202	202	20 September 1974	Missing
203	203	26 September 1974	Missing
204	204	27 September 1974	Missing
205	205	3 October 1974	Missing
206	206	4 October 1974	Missing
207	207	10 October 1974	Missing
208	208	11 October 1974	Missing
209	209	17 October 1974	Missing
210	210	18 October 1974	Missing
211	211	24 October 1974	Missing
212	212	25 October 1974	Missing
213	213	31 October 1974	Missing
214	214	1 November 1974	Missing
215	215	7 November 1974	Missing
216	216	8 November 1974	Missing
217	217	14 November 1974	Missing
218	218	15 November 1974	Missing
219	219	21 November 1974	Missing
220	220	22 November 1974	Missing
221	221	28 November 1974	Missing
222	222	29 November 1974	Missing
223	223	5 December 1974	Missing
224	224	6 December 1974	Missing
225	225	12 December 1974	Missing
226	226	13 December 1974	Missing
227	227	19 December 1974	Missing
228	228	20 December 1974	Missing
229	229	2 January 1975	Missing
230	230	3 January 1975	Missing
231	231	9 January 1975	Exists (PAL 2" colour videotape)
232	232	10 January 1975	Exists (PAL 2" colour videotape)
233	233	16 January 1975	Exists (PAL 2" colour videotape)
234	234	17 January 1975	Exists (PAL 2" colour videotape)
235	235	23 January 1975	Exists (PAL 2" colour videotape)
236	236	24 January 1975	Exists (PAL 2" colour videotape)
237	237	30 January 1975	Exists (PAL 2" colour videotape)
238	238	31 January 1975	Exists (PAL 2" colour videotape)
239	239	6 February 1975	Exists (PAL 2" colour videotape)
240	240	7 February 1975	Exists (PAL 2" colour videotape)
241	241	13 February 1975	Missing
242	242	14 February 1975	Missing
243	243	20 February 1975	Missing
244	244	21 February 1975	Missing
245	245	27 February 1975	Missing
246	246	28 February 1975	Missing
247	247	6 March 1975	Missing
248	248	7 March 1975	Missing
249	249	13 March 1975	Missing
250	250	14 March 1975	Missing
251	251	20 March 1975	Missing
252	252	21 March 1975	Missing
253	253	27 March 1975	Missing
254	254	28 March 1975	Missing
255	255	3 April 1975	Missing
256	256	4 April 1975	Missing
257	257	10 April 1975	Missing
258	258	11 April 1975	Exists (PAL 2" colour videotape)
259	259	17 April 1975	Missing
260	260	18 April 1975	Missing
261	261	24 April 1975	Missing
262	262	25 April 1975	Missing
263	263	1 May 1975	Missing
264	264	2 May 1975	Missing
265	265	8 May 1975	Missing
266	266	9 May 1975	Missing
267	267	15 May 1975	Missing
268	268	16 May 1975	Missing
269	269	22 May 1975	Missing
270	270	28 May 1975	Missing

=== Series 2 (1975) ===
No. overall	No. in Series	Original Broadcast Date	Episode Title
271	1	18 July 1975	"Due to Natural Causes"
272	2	25 July 1975	"In the Public Interest"
273	3	1 August 1975	"An Outbreak of Faith"
274	4	8 August 1975	"Cry for Help"
275	5	15 August 1975	"A Family Affair"
276	6	22 August 1975	"The 24-Hour Man"
277	7	29 August 1975	"The White Rajah"
278	8	5 September 1975	"Whatever Happened to Charlie Bravo?"
279	9	12 September 1975	"The Celebration"
280	10	19 September 1975	"Armstrong’s Day"
281	11	26 September 1975	"The Candidate"
282	12	3 October 1975	"See No Evil"
283	13	10 October 1975	"A Matter of Intent"

=== Series 3 (1976) ===
No. overall	No. in Series	Original Broadcast Date	Episode Title
284	1	4 June 1976	"All Fall Down"
285	2	11 June 1976	"Conflict"
286	3	18 June 1976	"Heads You Lose"
287	4	25 June 1976	"Twice Shy"
288	5	2 July 1976	"Red Alert"
289	6	9 July 1976	"A Life for a Life"
290	7	16 July 1976	"Great Expectations"
291	8	23 July 1976	"The Switch"
292	9	30 July 1976	"The Needle"
293	10	6 August 1976	"The Casualty"
294	11	13 August 1976	"A Question of Conscience"
295	12	20 August 1976	"Blackmail"
296	13	27 August 1976	"Last Victory"
297	14	3 September 1976	"A Matter of Concern"
298	15	10 September 1976	"Stitch in Time"
299	16	17 September 1976	"A Woman of Some Importance"
300	17	24 September 1976	"Night Duty"
301	18	1 October 1976	"Quiet Weekend"
302	19	8 October 1976	"Catspaw"
303	20	15 October 1976	"Another Time, Another Place"

=== Series 4 (1977) ===
No. overall	No. in Series	Original Broadcast Date	Episode Title
304	1	27 May 1977	"Who’s Been Sleeping in My Chair?"
305	2	3 June 1977	"Think Small"
306	3	10 June 1977	"Rock Bottom"
307	4	17 June 1977	"Penny Wise"
308	5	24 June 1977	"Hit and Run"
309	6	1 July 1977	"Loyalty Is What They Stab You With"
310	7	8 July 1977	"Sons and Daughters"
311	8	15 July 1977	"Serious Professional Misconduct"
312	9	22 July 1977	"Unknown Quantity"
313	10	29 July 1977	"Until Proved Innocent"
314	11	5 August 1977	"Exits and Entrances"
315	12	12 August 1977	"Past Imperfect"
316	13	19 August 1977	"The Joker"

=== Series 5 (1977–78) ===
No. overall	No. in Series	Original Broadcast Date	Episode Title
317	1	2 December 1977	"A Pound of Flesh"
318	2	9 December 1977	"The Breakthrough"
319	3	16 December 1977	"The Jinx"
320	4	30 December 1977	"One Man’s Meat"
321	5	6 January 1978	"Spectre at the Feast"
322	6	13 January 1978	"A Very Public Man"
323	7	20 January 1978	"Second Opinion"
324	8	27 January 1978	"Last Chance"
325	9	3 February 1978	"Matter of Policy"
326	10	10 February 1978	"Blood and Water"
327	11	17 February 1978	"The Hunted"
328	12	24 February 1978	"House Call"

=== Series 6 (1978–79) ===
No. overall	No. in Series	Original Broadcast Date	Episode Title
329	1	3 November 1978	"The Squatter"
330	2	10 November 1978	"It's Cold Outside"
331	3	17 November 1978	"Wheels and Deals"
332	4	24 November 1978	"Square One"
333	5	1 December 1978	"Instinct"
334	6	8 December 1978	"Full Agenda"
335	7	15 December 1978	"Life Lines"
336	8	29 December 1978	"Long Weekend"
337	9	5 January 1979	"The Buck Stops Where?"
338	10	12 January 1979	"Pass the Parcel"
339	11	19 January 1979	"Technical Hitch"
340	12	26 January 1979	"Killer at Large"
