= Ann George =

English actress

- Born: 5 March 1903; Smethwick, Staffordshire, England
- Died: 8 September 1989 (aged 86)
- Occupation: Actress
- Years active: 1930s–1989
- Spouses: George Snape; Gordon Buckingham
- Children: 1

Ann George (5 March 1903 – 8 September 1989) was an English actress best known for her role as Amy Turtle in the television soap opera Crossroads.

== Early life and career ==
George was born in Smethwick, and entered show business as a singer appearing in musicals such as The Belle of New York and The Desert Song and featured in the Gilbert and Sullivan show D'Oyly Carte. She loved to sing and made a special appearance at Birmingham Town Hall singing in Handel's Messiah.

Ann George also had her own cabaret act singing and telling jokes. After her first husband, George Snape, died, she took his first name as her stage name.

== Career at Crossroads ==
George joined the cast of Crossroads in 1965 as Amy Turtle. She got the part after apparently complaining to ATV producers that there were not enough true Birmingham accents. She first appeared on-screen in 1966, working for Kitty Jarvis (Beryl Johnstone) at the newsagent's shop. She later became a cleaning lady at the Crossroads Motel, working for formidable housekeeper Mrs Loomis. Critics derided George's performance; Crossroads was shot as live, and the low budget meant that the recording could not be edited and retakes were rare. In 1976, George was dropped from Crossroads; there followed a photograph of her in The Sun, waving her fists outside the ATV Studios. In the storyline, Amy was convicted of shoplifting, but only later did the truth become known: that it was a cry for help, as her son Billy had been killed in tragic circumstances. One of her last performances was a storyline in which Amy broke into Coventry Cathedral at nightfall in order to mourn her son. Following this, the character emigrated to Texas to live with her nephew and cope with her grief.

The character is most famously remembered for a plot that never happened. The storyline of Amy Turtle being arrested for being a Soviet double agent, Amelia Turtleovski, was never broadcast. Crossroads Appreciation Society researchers, working through the show's script documents, discovered that Amy was never arrested, nor was she accused of any crime – simply that a Russian guest at the motel mistook her for Amelia, and left Amy baffled by his reaction to her.

During these years George worked in clubs and pantomimes, before briefly returning to the programme in 1987. Crossroads was now produced by William Smethurst, who insisted on bringing Amy back in an attempt to boost ratings. It was unsuccessful, and the show was axed the following year.

According to Victoria Wood, the character of Mrs Overall in her soap opera parody Acorn Antiques was half-inspired by the Amy Turtle character Mrs Overall, played by Julie Walters, who hailed from the same town as George, Smethwick.

== Later years and death ==
One of her last interviews took place on LWT's The Six O'Clock Show where she talked enthusiastically about her return to the show in 1987, as well as the small fees paid to the series' actors. George was also given the opportunity to address her reputation for forgetting her lines, and made it quite clear that she wasn't the only cast member to suffer with this problem.

Ann George became ill towards the end of the 1980s while still appearing in Crossroads, and after a long battle with cancer she died on 8 September 1989, leaving her second husband Gordon Buckingham and a son, George Jr by her first marriage. At the time of her death The Noele Gordon and Crossroads Appreciation Society hailed her as the Queen Mum of the soap.
