= General Hospital (British TV series) =

British daytime soap opera (1972-1979)

- Genre: Drama
- Starring: Lewis Jones; David Garth; James Kerry; Ian White; Lynda Bellingham; Judy Buxton; John Halstead; Carmen Munroe; Tony Adams
- Country of origin: United Kingdom
- No. of series: 6
- No. of episodes: 340 (232 missing) (list of episodes)

Production
- Running time: 30 minutes (Series 1); 60 minutes (Series 2–6)
- Production company: ATV

Original release
- Network: ITV
- Release: 19 October 1972 – 26 January 1979

General Hospital is a British daytime soap opera produced by ATV that ran on ITV from 1972 to 1979. General Hospital was an attempt to replicate the success of one of British television's first major soap operas, Emergency Ward 10. The original theme music was "Girl in the White Dress" by the Derek Scott Orchestra which was used until 1975, when it was replaced by Johnny Pearson's "Red Alert" for the 60-minute episodes.

== History ==
In 1972, ITV started to broadcast programmes on weekday afternoons, triggering a new wave of productions to fill in the extended schedules. Among the first of these shows, which were aimed at giving advertisers access to housewives, were the long-running rural soap Emmerdale Farm (YTV) and the twice-weekly medical drama General Hospital.

Set in a fictional Midlands town, the series followed the romantic and professional lives of its doctors and nurses. While the location and the characters names had been changed, in most other respects General Hospital was almost identical to its predecessor, Emergency Ward 10, a deliberate attempt to recreate its success.

In 1975, after 270 twice-weekly episodes, General Hospital was given a prime time slot on Friday evening. The move saw the episode lengths double from 30 to 60 minutes, with each episode being more self-contained, while on-screen medical procedures, including detailed scenes of surgery, became more prominent.

Amongst the regular cast of the series was actor Tony Adams who played Doctor Neville Bywaters; he also appeared as Adam Chance in Crossroads. Among the other familiar faces to appear was Lynda Bellingham, who later was later cast as the mother in a series of commercials for Oxo stock cubes, and later as Helen Herriot in the series All Creatures Great and Small, based on the books by James Herriot. Other regulars included Carmen Munroe, who was also a regular presenter in the Play School children's programme team; and a young Sally Knyvette, who went on to appear in Blake's 7 and Emmerdale Farm.

By 1979, the "homely" feel of General Hospital was considered to be old-fashioned in the wake of newer, grittier dramas, and it was cancelled. Many episodes are missing from television archives.

=== Series overview ===
Series	Episodes	Originally released	
Series	Episodes	First released	Last released
1	270	19 October 1972	28 May 1975
2	13	18 July 1975	10 October 1975
3	20	4 June 1976	15 October 1976
4	13	27 May 1977	19 August 1977
5	12	2 December 1977	24 February 1978
6	12	3 November 1978	26 January 1979

== Cast list ==
- Lewis Jones as Mr William Parker-Brown, Consultant in trauma medicine and executive director
- David Garth as Dr Matthew Armstrong, Consultant in emergency medicine and clinical lead
- James Kerry as Dr Martin Baxter, Consultant in emergency medicine
- Ian White as Dr Peter Ridge, Consultant in emergency medicine
- Lynda Bellingham as Nurse Hilda Price, Senior sister/emergency nurse practitioner/clinical nurse manager
- Barbara Kellerman Nurse Laura Hardy
- Judy Buxton as Student Nurse Katy Shaw
- Peggy Sinclair as Sister Ellen Chapman
- Tony Adams as Dr Neville Bywaters, Consultant paediactrician
- Eric Lander as Dr Richard Kirby, Specialist registrar in emergency medicine
- Patricia Maynard as Dr Joanna Whitworth, Senior house officer
- Pippa Reid as Sister Doreen Holland,
- John Halstead as Arnold Capper, porter
- Monica Grey as Sister Edwards, chaplain
- Jason Rose as Dr Herbert Chipato, Consultant general surgeon
- Carmen Munroe as Sister Frances Washington
- Carl Rigg as Dr Gregory Knight, Consultant cardiothoracic surgeon
- Tom Adams as Mr Guy Wallman, Consultant general surgeon/CEO
- Sally Knyvette as Nurse Rowland
- Amber Thomas as Nurse Stevens
- Donal Cox as Dr Donald Morley
- Veronica Hurst as Dr Hamlyn
- Harold Kasket as Dr Sterne
- Petra Davies as Dr Petra Hunt
- Ronald Leigh-Hunt as Dr Robert Thorne
- Jenny Twigge as Dr Wadham
- Rosemary Nicols as Dr Lacey
- Jane How as Nurse Preston
- Jonathan Dennis as Dr Rogers
- John Line as Dr Robertson
- Jean Rimmer as Sister Harrington
- Pamela Allen as Sister Bellamy

== DVD Releases ==
In August 2012 a DVD of the surviving episodes from the original 270 twice-weekly version of the show was released under the banner Series 1. The DVD includes episodes 1, 2, 3*, 4, 6*, 7*, 8*, 9*, 10*, 11*, 12*, 13*, 15*, 16*, 17*, 18*, 19*, 21*, 22*, 23*, 24*, 25*, 26*, 29, 32, 100, 126, 231, 232, 233, 234, 235, 236, 237, 238, 239, 240, 258 (episodes marked with a "*" were made in colour but now only survive in Black and White).

A second volume containing the first prime time series was due for release in April 2013 but did not appear.
