= Zeph Gladstone =

British actress (1937–2002)

- Born: Zephyrine Frances Gladstone; 20 September 1937; Norwood, London, England, United Kingdom
- Died: 28 October 2002 (aged 65); London, England, United Kingdom
- Occupation: Actress
- Known for: Crossroads (TV series)

Zephyrine Frances "Zeph" Gladstone (20 September 1937 - 28 October 2002) was an English television actress, from Norwood in south London. She was best known for her role as the "tart with a heart" hairdresser Vera Downend on the soap opera Crossroads, a role she played from 1970 to 1977.

== Early life ==
She attended Selhurst Grammar School for Girls and the Royal Central School of Speech and Drama.

== Career ==
Gladstone started her television career in ITV Play of the Week in 1964. She moved on to a permanent part on the series Dixon of Dock Green. She also appeared in 'The Baron' as a revolutionary in 'Evening of Hunter', with future 'Crossroads' star Sue Lloyd, in her role on Crossroads that was most enduring. Gladstone started on the series in June 1970, playing an experienced hairdresser setting up a salon business in the Crossroads Motel. Despite a rough veneer and bad choices, Gladstone's character, Vera Downend, was essentially a "positive" character and developed favourable fan reaction. Gladstone was signed to a contract, which she kept until her departure in October 1977.

Gladstone's most famous role would also be her last on television. She died in London, England in October 2002 at the age of 65.

== Filmography ==
- Emergency Ward 10 (TV series) (1963-1963) - Miss Berry
- ITV Play of the Week (TV series) (1964)
- The Avengers (TV series) (1966) = Liz
- Oh! What a Lovely War (1969) - Sir John's Chauffeuse (uncredited)
- The Oblong Box (1969) - Trench's Girl
- Dixon of Dock Green (TV series)
- Crossroads (TV series) 1970-1977) - Vera Downend
