= Elizabeth Croft =

Canadian roboticist

Elizabeth A. Croft is a Canadian roboticist known for her work on human–robot interaction. She is the vice president and provost of the University of Victoria.

== Education and career ==
Elizabeth A. Croft is a Canadian roboticist and engineering academic known for her research in human/robot interaction. She currently serves as Vice-President Academic and Provost at the University of Victoria, where she oversees the university’s academic direction and helps set academic priorities. In this role, she is responsible for maintaining standards in teaching and learning while supporting academic programs and services for students and faculty.

Before joining the University of Victoria, Croft served as Dean of Engineering at Monash University in Melbourne, Australia. Earlier in her career, she was a tenured full professor in the Department of Mechanical Engineering at the University of British Columbia. While at UBC’s Faculty of Applied Science, she held several leadership roles, including Senior Associate Dean, Associate Dean for Education and Professional Development, and Associate Head of the Department of Mechanical Engineering. She worked to increase participation in engineering among women and other underrepresented groups.

Croft’s research focuses on robotics and human/robot interaction. Her work has included studies in robot manipulation and learning, as well as social interaction between humans and robots.

== Awards and Recognition ==
Throughout her career, Croft has received several awards and professional recognition in engineering and higher education. These include the Accelerator Award from the Natural Sciences and Engineering Research Council of Canada in 2007 and the Alan Blizzard Award from the Society for Teaching and Learning in Higher Education in 2008. In 2014 she was named one of WXN’s Top 100 Most Powerful Women in Canada, and in 2018 she received the R.A. McLachlan Award from the Canadian Academy of Engineering. Croft has also been elected a Fellow of several professional organizations, including the American Society of Mechanical Engineers, Engineers Canada, the Institution of Engineers Australia, and the Canadian Academy of Engineering

Croft graduated from the University of British Columbia in 1988, she earned a master's degree at the University of Waterloo in 1992, and completed her Ph.D. at the University of Toronto in 1995.

She became a faculty member at the University of British Columbia, where she was a professor in the Department of Mechanical Engineering, Marshall Bauder Professor in Engineering Economics, and associate dean of the Faculty of Applied Science. She was the NSERC Chair for Women in Science and Engineering (BC&Yukon) from 2010 to 2015 and chaired the national network of CWSEs. She moved to Monash University in Melbourne, Australia in 2017 as dean of engineering and professor in the Departments of Mechanical and Aerospace Engineering and Electrical and Computer Systems Engineering.

== Recognition ==
Croft was named a Fellow of the American Society of Mechanical Engineers in 2010, and a Fellow of the Australian Academy of Technology and Engineering in 2021. She is also a Fellow of the Institution of Engineers Australia and the Canadian Academy of Engineering.
