= Neville Hughes =

British actor (1945–2015)

- Born: John David Howell Hughes; 1 June 1945; St Clears, Wales
- Died: 28 June 2015 (aged 70); Wales
- Occupations: Actor; Business consultant
- Years active: 1965-1975; 1975-2002
- Known for: Crossroads; John D H Hughes Consultancy

Neville Hughes (1 June 1945 – 28 June 2015) was a British actor in the 1960s and 1970s. Later he was a successful businessman in the motor manufacturer sales and marketing sector.

John David Howell Hughes was born in 1945 at St. Clears, Wales. He was educated at Eagle House Prep School and Radley College where he was a brilliant young stage actor. He started to train as a doctor at St Thomas' Hospital, but gave it up. After joining RADA in 1965, and working in repertory theatre, Hughes made his television debut in "The Man and the Hour". The following year he made his debut in Crossroads, for which he is best known, as Rev Peter Hope, where he played opposite Sue Nicholls. He was also in the very first episode of Dad's Army in 1968. Following this success he continued to appear in the role of Rev Peter Hope in Crossroads for four years. He appeared in theatre, film, radio and television roles including The Avengers, Department S, The Protectors, Emergency – Ward 10, Father Brown and Rebecca. He also appeared in the 1973 film Soft Beds, Hard Battles with Peter Sellers.

In 1975 Hughes was offered the opportunity to work for on an 'apprentice scheme' with car manufacturer BMW. He took to the role as a salesman, quickly becoming the company's best salesman of the year. From as sales trainer he became National Training Manager. In 1980 he seized the opportunity to set up his own company, Training Power Ltd. The company was a success securing a notable client list with top brands, Mercedes, BMW, Jaguar, GM and Volvo. It expanded into consultancy in films and television crossing four continents: Australasia, USA and the Middle East. After a management takeover John Hughes set up John D.H. Hughes Consultancy offering bespoke training programmes to the motor industry, while also focussing on middle management and director-level recruitment.

He retired to his roots in West Wales where, indulging an enthusiasm for fly fishing, he set up a firm called Fishing Pursuits, that provided smoked fish to restaurants and pubs. He died at home in Wales leaving behind a wife and family.
