= Crossroads (British TV series) =

British TV soap opera (1964–1988, 2001–2003)

- 2003 title sequence
- Also known as: Crossroads Motel; Crossroads King's Oak
- Genre: Soap opera
- Created by: Hazel Adair; Peter Ling
- Written by: Michala Crees; Ivor Jay; Rosalie Grayson; Raymond Bowers; David Garfield; Edward F. Barnes; Arthur Schmidt; Alan Wiggins; Aubrey Cash
- Directed by: John Scholz-Conway; Dorothy Denham; Alan Coleman; Jack Barton; Teddy Abraham; David Dunn; Malcolm Taylor; Geoff Husson; Mike Holgate
- Starring: List of characters
- Opening theme: Tony Hatch (1964–1987); Raf Ravenscroft & Max Early (1988)
- Country of origin: United Kingdom
- Original language: English
- No. of episodes: Original series: 4,510; Revived series: 320; Total: 4,830

Production
- Producer: Reg Watson
- Production locations: Alpha Studios, Aston (1964–1969); ATV Centre / Central House, Birmingham (1969–1988); Television House / Carlton Studios, Nottingham (2001–2003)
- Running time: 30 minutes (including adverts)
- Production companies: ATV (1964–1981); Central Independent Television (1982–1988); Carlton Television (2001–2003)

Original release
- Network: ITV
- Release: 2 November 1964 – 4 April 1988
- Release: 5 March 2001 – 30 May 2003

Crossroads (later known as Crossroads Motel and Crossroads King's Oak) is a British television soap opera that ran on ITV over two periods – the original 1964 to 1988 run, followed by a short revival from 2001 to 2003. Set in a fictional motel (hotel in the revival) in the Midlands, Crossroads became a byword for low production values, particularly in the 1970s and early 1980s. Despite this, the series regularly attracted huge audiences during this time, with viewership numbers reaching as high as 15 million viewers.

It was created by Hazel Adair and Peter Ling, and produced by ATV (until the end of 1981) and then by ATV's successor, Central Independent Television until 1988 when it was axed. The series was revived by Carlton Television in 2001, but due to low ratings it was cancelled again in 2003.

== Storylines ==
=== 1964–1988 ===
The original premise of Crossroads was based on the everyday lives of two feuding sisters, their businesses, staff and customers, specifically in relation to the Crossroads Motel, in the village of Kings Oak near Birmingham. On hearing that Heathbury town council wanted to build a motorway through part of her land, astute businesswoman Meg Richardson (Noele Gordon) had used the compensation money the council offered, and her late husband Charles's insurance money, to convert their large Georgian home into a motel – a motor-hotel aimed at motorists with parking outside their chalet. Crossroads had 16 chalets, bar, kitchen, office and private sitting room. According to Meg, the clientele included tourists who were journeying to places like "Stratford on Avon, the Lake District or even those breaking a journey going up to Scotland, as well as commercial travellers, people who have their business going up and down the Midlands, and theatre people." Charles Richardson and Meg had two children: hotel receptionist Jill (Jane Rossington), born in 1946, and schoolboy Alexander, or "Sandy" (Roger Tonge), who was born in 1950.

Meg went on to become engaged to businessman Hugh Mortimer (John Bentley) but he initially married Jane Templeton (Rosalie Ashley), who was dying of a brain tumor, in order for her to come to England to undergo an operation. She died in hospital, never regaining consciousness following surgery. Meg was then courted by Malcolm Ryder (David Davenport) whom she later married, however, he was a weak, unscrupulous man, and when he found himself in financial difficulties he decided to poison Meg and claim the insurance money. He was discovered, and when confronted with his crime walked out of the motel and out of Meg's life. Some time later, news came that he had burnt to death in a car crash in South America, which turned out not to be true; and after the police arrested him for his doppelgänger's murder, a divorce was sought. Eight years after their first meeting, Meg and Hugh re-met, fell in love and were married in 1975 at Birmingham Cathedral. Hugh was kidnapped by Australian terrorists, and died of a heart attack in 1978.

In 1970, Jill married John Crayne (Mark Rivers), who, it turned out is already married with a wife and two young daughters living in Switzerland. Jill had therefore married a bigamist, making the marriage null and void; this led Jill to attempt suicide. Following her recovery, Jill turned her attention to down-to-earth electrician Stan Harvey (Edward Clayton), whom she married the following year. In 1975, Jill gave birth to a daughter, Sarah Jane Harvey (Sorrel Dunger). In 1977, Stan spent some time on business in Germany and it was during his absence that Jill had an affair with her step-brother, Anthony Mortimer (Jeremy Sinden) to whom she became pregnant, with their child Matthew, who was subsequently born in 1978. Despite trying to reconcile, Jill and Stan's marriage ended in him winning a bitter custody battle, which led to him and Sarah Jane moving to Germany. Anthony thereafter took Matthew to live in New York. Jill had a one-night stand with a television engineer, and again attempted suicide. Jill meets womanizing accountant and later Crossroads manager Adam Chance (Tony Adams) on Christmas Day 1978, and in 1983 they are eventually married. This said, by 1988, Jill leaves Adam for a new life with publican John Maddingham (Jeremy Nicholas).

Meg's sister Kitty Jarvis (Beryl Johnstone) ran The Shopday Store, a newsagent's and tobacconist's shop in the nearby town of Heathbury, where she lived with her pipe-smoking husband Dick Jarvis (Brian Kent), and their son Brian (David Fennell), who was born in 1945. In the program's pre-publicity and first episode it is stated that Dick and Kitty have a daughter, Lesley, who is "out in Australia, doing very well for herself", unseen, she later marries Maurice Grant, a doctor at St. Joseph's Hospital Adelaide. Dick is initially unemployed, and struggles financially to the point of "borrowing" £2 from Kitty's shop till without asking her, with suspicion of the theft falling on their lodger Patrick Wade (Malcolm Young), who unbeknownst to Kitty and Dick is in reality an army deserter by the name of Philip Carroll.

After going on dates to such places as the Heathbury Bowling Alley and the motel coffee bar, Brian becomes engaged to car hire secretary Janice Gifford (Carolyn Lyster), whom he marries in 1965, the same year Meg's and Kitty's brother Andy Fraser (Ian Patterson) marries widow woman Ruth Bailey (Pamela Greenhall). The character of Kitty was written out in 1969 after the death of actress Beryl Johnstone. Additional extended family members included Meg's black adopted daughter, Melanie Harper (Cleo Sylvestre), Meg's adoptive son Bruce Richardson (Michael Walker), Meg's niece Penny Richardson (Diana Grayson), and Meg, Kitty and Andy's mother "Granny" Fraser (Mollie Maureen). Dick's father Enoch Jarvis (Jack Hayes) also makes an appearance.

Among those closest to Meg or her family were former actress Tish Hope (Joy Andrews), Reverend Peter Hope (Neville Hughes), Kitchen worker Vi Blundell (Peggy Aitchison), hotel chef Carlos Raphael (Anthony Morton), his wife Josefina (Gillian Betts), waitress Marilyn Gates (Sue Nicholls and then Nadine Hanwell), kitchen assistant Amy Turtle (Ann George), postmistress Edith Tatum (Elisabeth Croft), and motel waitress Diane Lawton (Susan Hanson). Others connected to the motel included, suave manager and later motel director David Hunter (Ronald Allen), his first wife Rosemary (Janet Hargreaves), their son Chris (Freddie Foote and later Stephen Hoye), David's second wife Barbara (Sue Lloyd), Chefs Gerald Lovejoy (William Avenell), Bernard Booth (David Lawton) and Shughie McFee (Angus Lennie), hairdresser Vera Downend (Zeph Gladstone), the Harvey family, consisting of father Wilf (Morris Parsons) and his grown children Stan (Edward Clayton and later Terry Molloy) and Sheila (Sonia Fox), accountant and later motel manager Adam Chance (Tony Adams), and cleaner Doris Luke (Kathy Staff). Perhaps the most memorable character proved to be the mentally challenged Benny Hawkins (Paul Henry), whose trademark was a woolly hat that was worn all year round. His fans included British troops serving in the Falklands War in 1982, who nicknamed the Falkland Islanders "Bennies" after the character. Instructed to stop using the name, the troops came up with "Stills" for locals – because they were "still Bennies".

Over the years the series dealt with storylines which were controversial for the times. A single parent working at the motel was hugely controversial in the mid-1960s, as was Sandy Richardson becoming a permanent wheelchair user after a car accident in 1972. The storyline was developed when actor Roger Tonge had himself become a wheelchair user off screen - when he was diagnosed with Hodgkins Lymphoma - as a way to keep him in the series, thus becoming the first paraplegic regular character portrayed in a British soap opera.

The series also saw black characters appearing regularly – a follow-on from the 1960s BBC soap Compact, also created by Hazel Adair and Peter Ling. Melanie Harper (Cleo Sylvestre) arrived at the motel in 1970 as Meg's foster daughter (itself a taboo issue). Sylvestre was given the role by producer Reg Watson after press coverage of racial tensions in the Birmingham area at that time. In 1978, garage mechanic Joe MacDonald (Carl Andrews) arrived. The year before, an interracial summer romance took place between Cockney garage mechanic Dennis Harper (Guy Ward) and motel receptionist Meena Chaudri (Karan David).

1981 saw a highly controversial storyline about a false accusation of rape; a 1983 storyline saw a test tube baby born to Glenda and Kevin Banks (Lynette McMorrough and David Moran). The subject of Down syndrome was also raised in 1983 with an insight into the life of Nina Weill, a little girl who, as Nina Paget, was befriended by three of the regular Crossroads characters.

The character of Meg Richardson was axed in 1981 and was thought to have died in a fire that gutted the motel, but turned up alive aboard the QE2, about to sail to a new life overseas. Newspapers reported that three endings were planned for Meg: she would either die in the fire, take sleeping pills or disappear for a while and turn up on the QE2. Viewers were surprised to see producers had used all three. Meg returns briefly in 1983 for a reunion with Jill and Adam on their honeymoon in Venice.

In 1985, new producer Phillip Bowman was planning to bring the character of Meg Richardson back into the show as a "permanent occasional". Plans were well advanced and scripts were written when Noele Gordon died in April of that year, aged 65. Edward Clayton was brought back as Jill's ex-husband Stan Harvey to read the lines originally written for Gordon.

In 1986, the new character Ray Grice played by Al Hunter Ashton was introduced as part of an attempt to create wider storylines.

Recording for the show ended at Christmas 1987 with the final episode (a feature length finale) broadcast in April 1988 where Jill drives off into the sunset with her lover to open a "little hotel in the West" that she thought they could call "Crossroads".

Although Crossroads had always been a family run business, others throughout the years had become shareholders, most notably, Tish Hope, Bernard Booth, Gerald Lovejoy, Louise Borelli, David Hunter, Hugh Mortimer, Adam Chance, Barbara Hunter, J. Henry Pollard and his daughter Miranda. However, by the early 1980s it became apparent that the family and their shareholders thought differently about the motel's future, and in 1985, it was sold off to Major International Hotels, under the management of Nicola Freeman (Gabrielle Drake).

MIH then sold the motel to Tommy Lancaster (Terence Rigby) and his family-run Red Ox business in 1987, transforming it into a luxury hotel that was first named The Crossroads Country Hotel, then, The Kings Oak Country Hotel.

After the death of his wife Mary, Tommy put the hotel back on the market and it was bought by another chain, The Three Crowns Group, with the takeover period overseen by Daniel Freeman (Philip Goodhew) – the stepson of former MIH boss Nicola Freeman.

=== 2001–2003 ===
With the revival in 2001, changes were made to characters and stories. Jill Chance had married John Maddingham (Jeremy Nicholas) and been widowed, but was calling herself Jill Harvey again, the name by which she had been known prior to her marriage to Adam Chance in 1983. In the revival, Jill Harvey owned thirty percent of the hotel, which was never explained as she had divested all her interest in the hotel in 1985 and the original series ended with her opting not to buy the hotel back with her estranged husband Adam Chance. The battle over Jill's shares formed the backbone of the storylines for the new series' early episodes. References were also made to the Russell family taking over a "failing motel", despite Crossroads having become a hotel in the late 1980s. In the final episode of the original series, the name 'King's Oak Country Hotel' was seen over the entrance doors.

Lack of real links to the past, and the killing of Jill a few months into the new run, turned many fans away. Popular characters in the new Crossroads included new owner Kate Russell (Jane Gurnett), supercilious receptionist Virginia Raven (Sherrie Hewson), and womanizing deputy manager Jake Booth (Colin Wells). The storyline of the final episode was the revelation that the revived series and glamorous hotel had been a dream of supermarket worker and Crossroads fan Angela, with all the other characters revealed as shoppers. Angela even approaches a female customer in the supermarket and tells her she recognizes her as "Tracey Booth from Crossroads". Tracey's mother-in-law, Kate, was also shown as one of Angela's colleagues in the supermarket.

Crossroads aired its last ever episode on 30 May 2003.

== Production history ==
=== Original start dates ===
- 2 November 1964: ATV, Border Television and Ulster Television
- 4 January 1965: Anglia, Associated Rediffusion, TWW, Southern Television, Westward Television and Channel Television.
- 4 January 1965: Grampian Television. However the series was dropped in Autumn 1968 and then picked it back up in April 1969.
- 11 January 1965: Tyne Tees. The series was dropped and then picked up again several times through this period until January 1972.
- 29 March 1965: Scottish Television.
- 5 November 1968: Yorkshire Television. Also dropped the series for a short period until January 1972.
- 11 September 1972: Granada. The company decided to start with episodes broadcast in January 1972, and it was only screened 3 times a week: Monday, Wednesday and Friday. In March 1975, to match the network over 18 months worth of episodes were skipped.

=== ATV era ===
Crossroads title sequence (1969)

Crossroads began its run on Monday 2 November 1964 and was first shown five days a week. The episodes were then recorded "as live", a very common practice at the time, with very limited opportunities for retakes. Within a few months, 10 of the ITV companies had started broadcasting the series, though Granada never screened it during the 1960s. The Independent Television Authority (ITA) decreed in 1967 that Crossroads should be reduced in frequency to four episodes per week to improve its quality, by which point the series was no longer networked and each ITV station broadcast the series on different days. The series was widely derided by critics who criticized the wobbly sets and fluffed lines but gained many fans, most famously Prime Minister Harold Wilson's wife Mary Wilson, Lady Wilson of Rievaulx, who complained when the newly formed Thames Television (the franchisee for the London area) decided to stop showing the series in 1968. The decision proved unpopular with viewers and was reversed six months later. It was initially placed in a late afternoon slot. The gap in transmissions meant viewers in the Thames region were about six months behind the rest of the country for several years until just before Meg's wedding in March 1975. Crossroads was not fully broadcast to all ITV companies until 1972, when Granada took it up. Though second to Coronation Street in the ratings at the beginning of the decade, Crossroads did occasionally beat it, gaining audiences of up to 15 million viewers.

In 1979, the Independent Broadcasting Authority (IBA) – then commercial television's regulator – decided production should be reduced further to three episodes a week from April 1980; the IBA chairman, Lady Plowden, reportedly describing the soap opera as "distressingly popular". ATV planned to replace the fourth episode with a spin-off series called A Family Affair, but this idea was dropped.

Series star Noele Gordon, who played matriarch Meg Richardson, won the TV Times 'Most Compulsive Female Character' viewers award eight consecutive years during the 1970s. After winning for the eighth time, Gordon was placed in the TVTimes "Hall of Fame" and thenceforth ineligible for the award in the future. Viewers reacted negatively to the dismissal of Gordon in 1981, an action taken by head of programming Charles Denton who became a "national hate figure". The series producer Jack Barton agreed with Denton, thinking that Gordon's character had become too dominant, but Gordon's final episode gained heavy coverage in the press for some time.

In January 2023, ITVX screened a new drama featuring Helena Bonham Carter as Noele Gordon. Written by Russell T Davies, titled Nolly, it followed her period in and after Crossroads.

=== Central era ===
Crossroads Kings Oak title sequence (1987–88)

Despite having maintained its ITV franchise at the end of 1981, ATV was ordered by the IBA to reform into Central Independent Television, which took over the franchise on 1 January 1982 and was thought to show limited enthusiasm for the programs it inherited. Further changes were introduced in March 1985, when new filming locations, sets and characters were introduced. Storylines began to revolve around new motel owner Nicola Freeman (Gabrielle Drake), and long-term characters like David and Barbara Hunter (Ronald Allen and Sue Lloyd) were axed. The theme tune was also updated, and the opening titles replaced with a longer version. Finally, the show was renamed Crossroads Motel – although this fact was never formally announced by the show's production team, and the word "Motel" was simply incorporated into the opening titles. The closing titles, which had scrolled in horizontal and vertical 'crossroad' directions since the first episodes, were replaced with conventional scrolling credits.

In 1986, William Smethurst took over as producer following the dismissal of his predecessor, Philip Bowman. Smethurst had been brought in by Central Television's new head of drama, Ted Childs, and ordered changes aimed at improving production values and creating a wittier, more upmarket serial. Smethurst shifted the narrative centre to the nearby village of King's Oak, and yet more long-running characters, including fan favorites Diane Hunter (Susan Hanson) and Benny Hawkins (Paul Henry), were dropped; as with earlier changes, this was unpopular with viewers, who telephoned Central in protest. Smethurst gained the nickname "Butcher Bill" but was unfazed, having successfully reversed the declining fortunes of BBC radio soap The Archers. Smethurst insisted he only got backlash because his was the name the public knew.

Further changes included the series being renamed Crossroads Kings Oak for a time, with the intention in the future of shortening this to merely King's Oak. However, this final change was overtaken in June 1987 by Andy Allen, Central's director of programs, who chose to axe the series. The familiar theme tune was replaced in September 1987 by a new theme composed by Max Early and Raf Ravenscroft. New titles were introduced to accompany the new theme, which featured stills of King's Oak and the new King's Oak Country Hotel. Michele Buck guided the show through its final few months on air as series producer, with William Smethurst still on hand as executive producer.

In January 1988, the series was reduced to only two episodes a week, with Crossroads King's Oak finally coming to an end on 4 April 1988 (the Easter bank holiday). The last, extended episode saw the only remaining original character, Jill Chance (Jane Rossington), riding off with her new lover John Maddingham (Jeremy Nicholas). Asked what name she would give the hotel she would be running in her new life, the character remarked, a little sadly, "I always thought Crossroads was an awfully good name".

=== Carlton era ===
Crossroads title sequence (2001–02)

In April 2000, Carlton Television (who had bought Central in 1994) announced that they would be reviving Crossroads for the daytime slot on ITV. The first revived episode was broadcast on 5 March 2001 with a glossy format, to the surprise of the wider media. The revived series was sponsored by washing detergent Surf and was broadcast each weekday at 1.30pm and 5.05pm on ITV, with a Sunday omnibus on ITV2. The revived series was also broadcast in Ireland on RTÉ One and in New Zealand on TV One.

Four characters from the original series returned: Jill Harvey, her daughter Sarah-Jane (Joanne Farrell/Holly Newman), her ex-husband Adam Chance (Tony Adams) and motel cleaner Doris Luke (Kathy Staff). Initial reactions were favorable; however, changes in story from the original were puzzling for fans and did not help ratings. Kathy Staff left in dismay at the show's emphasis on sex, telling ITV Teletext that she felt it was no longer the family-friendly show she had originally been involved with.

The decision to kill off original character Jill Harvey, who was murdered by Adam Chance three months into the series' revival, proved unpopular with fans of the original show. Jane Rossington has said that she did not want to commit herself to another long run in the show, but warned Carlton it would be suicidal to kill Jill.

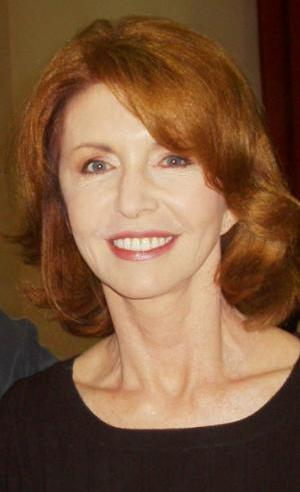
Jane Asher appeared in Crossroads as Angel Samson in 2003.

Episode 137 of the second revived series remains the only episode never to be shown in full on ITV. The lunchtime screening on Tuesday 11 September 2001 began at 14:10, but during the advertisement break, the program was interrupted by ITV News with coverage of the 9/11 attacks in New York City. A short recap of events in Episode 137 was screened before both the 14:10 and 17:05 showings of Episode 138 on 12 September 2001, and the episode was included in the Omnibus edition that Sunday.

The series was reduced to four episodes a week from 10 September 2001 until July/August 2002 before increasing to 5 episodes per week until 30 August 2002. From there, the series went into a hiatus from until January 2003, during which time further changes were made.

The remodeled series, under producer Yvon Grace, appeared to be a self-consciously camp parody with Jane Asher playing a new central character, Angel Samson. The series also featured appearances from Kate O'Mara and Anne Charleston, as well as light entertainment names including Lionel Blair, Les Dennis and Tim Brooke-Taylor. This remodeled revival also launched the careers of Freema Agyeman (Doctor Who, Law & Order: UK), Luke Roberts (Holby City and Mile High), Lucy Pargeter, Shauna Shim and Jessica Fox.

Yvon Grace admitted she was aiming the new Crossroads towards an LGBT audience, but fans were displeased by her ambivalence towards unresolved storylines from the 2001–2002 run. Plans were in place to bring Adam Chance back on a three-month contract in a last attempt to bring in more viewers; actor Tony Adams said that a down-on-his luck Adam would have been taken under Angel's wing as her personal assistant. But as ratings continued declining, the revived series was also axed in March 2003, with the final episode being broadcast on Friday 30 May.

The 2003 series was roundly criticized for moving too far away from the premise of the original 1964–88 series and the initial 2001–02 series, as well as for becoming "too camp". Jane Asher later apologized to fans for the way the 2003 series went. The ending scene of the final episode of the (second) revival was considered by many long-term fans to be quite weird and a bizarre surprise, where the entire revived run was revealed to have been entirely the daydream of a supermarket worker.

== Theme music ==
The Crossroads theme tune was composed by Tony Hatch. In 2004 Hatch said:

The budget for the music was low and it would have to be recorded in a TV studio in Birmingham – not the perfect acoustic conditions in comparison with the dedicated music recording studios I was used to. ... The original theme was actually two tunes. Each one represented one of the families and these tunes could be played separately or, because they shared the same chord sequence, together in counterpoint with each other. ... As the budget was small I decided to use a small rhythm section plus a harp and feature the first theme on a 12-string guitar with the second theme played on the oboe. Right at the beginning I put the famous 9-note motif – the call-sign which gets the family in front of the TV set.

A selection of cues was recorded, including "Meg's Theme" which eventually became the standard opening theme, "Kitty's Theme" which was phased out as action focused on the motel, the closing theme which combined both "Meg's" and "Kitty's" themes, and a variety of background pieces.

A rerecording by The Tony Hatch Sound was issued as a single by Pye Records in 1965. A special arrangement of the theme by Wings was occasionally used from the late 1970s, usually when an episode ended with a dramatic event; that version appears on the band's 1975 album Venus and Mars.

Central Independent Television's head of music Johnny Patrick rearranged the tune in 1985 for piano and synthesizer, upon the show's relaunch as Crossroads Motel by producer Philip Bowman. Following William Smethurst's arrival as producer in 1987, this recording was overdubbed with added synthesizers.

An entirely new theme aired in late 1987 when the series was relaunched as Crossroads, Kings Oak, composed by Johnny Patrick with Raf Ravenscroft, Max Early and the City of Birmingham Symphony Orchestra. This later formed the basis of the single released by actress Shona Lindsey, "Goodbye", to commemorate the end of the show in 1988. The B-side of Lindsey's single featured the original version of the 1964 Tony Hatch arrangement.

The 2001 revival brought back the original Tony Hatch theme, this time arranged and performed by Tony Flynn. Another version, in 2003, was arranged by Patrick Dineen and performed by the Liverpool Philharmonic.

== Locations ==
The fictional Crossroads Motel was in an equally fictional village near Birmingham, Kings Oak (there are real suburbs in south-west Birmingham called Kings Heath, Kings Norton and Selly Oak). A number of real-life hotels doubled for location filming; it is stated in the 1982 Crossroads Special that the Longshoot Motel (Nuneaton) was used as a 'blueprint' in designing the motel and it is likely that some scenes were filmed there during the run of the series.

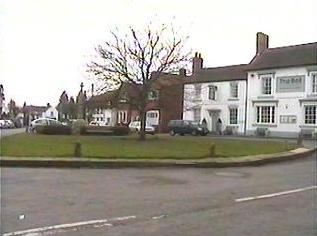
Tanworth-in-Arden as Kings Oak

In 1970, the series gained an O.B unit, giving it the freedom to do location shooting. Originally, Tanworth-in-Arden, south of Solihull, was used for King's Oak, although outside scenes were only occasionally used. Under Central, more location shooting began to be featured. Some early King's Oak location material was also filmed in Wolverhampton. The most famous location – as seen in the program during the 1960s and 1970s was not a motel at all, but The Shropshire Agricultural Institution (now called North Shropshire College). In October 2019 two of the buildings used during filming, teaching block and Bridden accommodation block were removed from the site.

It has also been suggested that Crossroads was filmed at a 1960s motel on Stratford Road in Alcester Warwickshire called CherryTrees (the buildings were demolished in 2001 and a care home was built), however it was a nearby petrol station (now closed) that was used in the early 1980s for filming a couple of outdoor scenes of the Crossroads garage. After the in-story destruction of the motel by fire, the revamped motel was filmed from 1982 at the Golden Valley Hotel (now Jurys Inn) in Cheltenham; from 1985 filming moved to the Penns Hall Hotel (now Ramada Jarvis Birmingham) in Sutton Coldfield, the changed appearance explained as being due to rebuilding. At the time of the move to Sutton Coldfield, new studio sets were also introduced.

Other locations included the canal (including Gas Street Basin) behind the studios in Birmingham; in-story this was the King's Oak Canal, on which hairdresser Vera Downend had a boat. The Chateau Impney Hotel also featured numerous times, most famously when Hugh proposed to Meg in 1973, and it was used to hold their wedding party two years later. The Chateau Impney was renamed the Droitwich Hotel on-screen. St Laurence's Church in Alvechurch was the setting for Jill and Adam Chance's wedding in 1983. Hagley Hall was used for the wedding reception. Helios Health Club based in Brierley Hill was used as the location for the Motel Health Club, filmed on Mondays when the health club was closed.

In 1985, Crossroads gained its first set of full length opening titles, filmed around Sutton Coldfield, Tanworth-in-Arden and in Birmingham city centre.

The revived Crossroads from 2001 was still set in the West Midlands; however, exterior shots were filmed at locations in and around Nottingham, such as Bingham and Redmile.

The original series was recorded at ATV's/Central's Broad Street studios in Birmingham, while the revived series was filmed at Carlton Studios in Nottingham.

== Critical reception ==
While critics mostly disliked the show from the start, it was more positively received by the viewing public and rivaled daytime soaps like General Hospital.

Despite the popularity of Crossroads with the viewing public, the show was often criticized by TV reviewers and ridiculed by British comedians. Television historian Hilary Kingsley stated that Crossroads never failed "to provide its critics with ammunition. Some of the acting would have disgraced the humblest of village halls; many of the plots were so farcical they could have been written in a bad dream, and much of the dialogue was pathetic." The Guinness Book of Classic British TV noted that "Crossroads was the series that no-one seemed to love. Yet at its peak, it was watched by more viewers than any other soap except Coronation Street."

The revived series received mixed reviews from critics.

== Acorn Antiques ==
Spoof soap opera Acorn Antiques, created by comedian Victoria Wood as part of Victoria Wood As Seen on TV, is a deliberate parody of Crossroads. The final episode of As Seen on TV features a faux documentary, 'The Making of Acorn Antiques', in which the actress playing Mrs. Overall (Julie Walters) – a character based on Crossroads characters Amy Turtle (Ann George) and Mavis Hooper (Charmian Eyre) – is revealed as a rather grand character who considers herself a huge star. This portrayal, plus a later pretend news item, in which it is revealed she has been sacked from the show, suggest the actress character (later given the name Bo Beaumont in the musical based on the sketches) is based on Noele Gordon, with Bo making her 'goodbye' appearance to the press in headscarf and large sunglasses, similar to Gordon.

== Legacy ==
In 1974 Crossroads did something unprecedented. It spun a plot that led to the creation of a charity - Crossroads Care. Meg Richardson (Noele Gordon) had a son, Sandy (Roger Tonge), who in a storyline began using a wheelchair after a car accident. Meg became his primary carer but was due to take a month's holiday and faced the dilemma of who would care for Sandy while she was away. She created the fictional support group Caring for Carers, and the storyline struck a chord with the viewing public.

It wasn't long before handicapped viewers or their families started calling in asking for information about the support group launched by Meg in the show. The only problem was that the support group was fictional and didn't exist. Recognizing an urgent need, Crossroads set up a charitable organization to fill the gap in care provision highlighted by its own storyline. ATV invested £10,000 (£130,000 in 2024) for a pilot scheme for 28 families and Crossroads, Caring for Carers was born. A successful charity emerged from the show with the purpose of delivering respite care services and support for unpaid carers across the United Kingdom.

What started as a television-inspired initiative grew into one of the UK's leading providers of support for carers and the people they care for. Spanning decades of work, Crossroads Care evolved but at its core, it remains devoted to alleviating the pressures faced by unpaid family carers.

=== Long Lasting Legacy ===
The organization's vital importance was highlighted even more during the COVID-19 pandemic where the need for carer support was brought sharply into focus. Crossroads Care's services became a beacon of hope and relief to many who were isolated or struggling to balance the weight of their caring responsibilities. The charity is now a network of more than 120 local independent charities with many still carrying the Crossroads name.

== DVD release ==
Network issued four volumes of the series on DVD (UK Region 2) in 2005, with 12 of the original ATV episodes in each volume (the first release including Meg's 1975 wedding, the highest rated episode), shortly followed Crossroads volume 2 was released (this second release included the 1981Crossroads fire, the third release was delayed due to the loss of ATV documents listing which episodes still exist, and ITV staff having to use other resources to locate episodes.

Crossroads Volume 3 was released on 26 February 2007. There are two versions of the DVD, one being a special limited edition, which contains an extra third disc – featuring recently found episodes from 1976. Crossroads Volume 4 was released on 17 September 2007.

Network was in the process of releasing all known surviving episodes (at the time) in transmission order exclusively through its website. The first set of 16 episodes was released in January 2008 and contained some episodes not previously available on earlier DVD releases. There are apparently 1,700 episodes of Crossroads in existence; most of these are from Central Television's run of the show from 1982 to 1988. Over 20 archive volumes of Crossroads, "with each and every surviving episode in transmission order", have been released so far, with Crossroads Archive Volume 20 the most recently released, in April 2009.

On 2 November 2009, to coincide with the show's 45th anniversary, Network re-released the 21 volumes – including Volume 1.1, see below – in a 41-disc box-set. Susan Hanson, who played Diane Hunter, appeared on The Alan Titchmarsh Show and Loose Women on 6 and 13 November 2009 respectively, to promote the box-set.

A black and white Crossroads Archive Volume 1.1 has also been released, containing the episode from April 1965, along with 2 further episodes (nos. 1884 and 1886 from March 1973, which were both originally made in colour but now survive only as black and white telerecordings).

On 1 December 2022, Network distribution under licence by ITV Studios announced a new DVD boxset titled Crossroads: The Noele Gordon Collection, a 94-disc DVD boxset. Containing over 700 episodes, of every episode known to exist from 1964, until the episode that originally aired on, 31 December 1981 including Gordon's last appearance in November 1981. Alongside special features, including. Noele's return - the episodes filmed in Venice in 1983, Original trailers and promos. Archive interviews with Noele Gordon, Crossroads: Thirty Years On, and Crossroads Revisited documentaries. An Exclusive photo souvenir magazine and much more! was released on 30 January 2023. In February 2023 Network re-released Crossroads volume 1 and Crossroads volume 2 together as a four DVD set, with new sleeve and disc artwork and titled Crossroads Classics.

== Repeats ==
From 1996 until 2000, episodes of the original series were repeated on UKTV channel UK Gold, airing three times a day at 7.30 am, 12.00 pm and 6.00 pm starting on Monday 4 November 1996 onwards, the first episode shown was Episode 3543 (originally aired on Thursday 3 December 1981) until the last original episode (Episode 4510 – aired on Monday 4 April 1988) concluded the repeat run on Friday 28 July 2000. For a brief period between February and September 2015, the original series aired on Big Centre TV on Freeview channel 8 in the Midlands or available online live at 9.00 pm each evening Monday to Saturday, which could also be watched free on their catchup service. As of 15 July 2021, a few selected episodes from the original series are available on BritBox, a subscription only service curated by the BBC and ITV.

== Spin-offs ==
=== Comic strip ===
Crossroads was adapted into a weekly comic strip in 1972 by Dutch comics artist Alfred Mazure, published in TVTimes.

== Awards ==
| Ceremony | Category | Year | Result | Ref |
|---|---|---|---|---|
| ITV Viewer Voted | ITV Programme of the Year | 1966 | Won | |
| ITV Viewer Voted | ITV Programme of the Year | 1967 | Won | |
| ITV Viewer Voted | ITV Personality of the Year | 1967 (Noele Gordon) | Won | |
| The Sun Awards | Best TV Series | 1972 | Won | |
| The Sun Awards | Best TV Series | 1973 | Won | |
| The Sun Awards | Best TV Series | 1974 | Won | |
| The Sun Awards | Best TV Series | 1975 | Won | |
| Daily Telegraph Awards | Programme of the Year | 1974 | Won | |
| Daily Telegraph Awards | Programme of the Year | 1975 | Won | |
| TV Times Awards | ITV Female Personality and / or Best Character | 1972-1977 (Noele Gordon) | Won | |
| TV Times Awards | Special Recognition Gold Award | 1975 (Noele Gordon) | Won | |
| TV Times Awards | Hall of Fame | 1978 (Noele Gordon) | Won | |
