= Paul Henry (actor) =

English actor

- Born: Paul Henry Smith; 3 January 1946 (age 79); Aston, Birmingham, England
- Education: Birmingham School of Speech and Drama, Birmingham Rep
- Occupation: Actor
- Spouse: Sheila
- Children: 2

Paul Henry Smith (born 3 January 1946), known professionally as Paul Henry, is an English actor best known for his role as Benny Hawkins in the soap opera Crossroads, on which he appeared on 354 episodes over 11 years.

== Early life and education ==
Born in Aston, Birmingham, Henry attended the city's Alderlea Boys School in Shard End with Jeff Lynne. Henry trained at the Birmingham School of Speech and Drama, which was followed by eight years at the Birmingham Repertory Theatre.

== Career ==
Henry's first acting credit was for his role as Guiccioli on the TV miniseries The Roads to Freedom.

In 1975, Henry featured in the British television police drama, The Sweeney. He appeared in the episode Stoppo Driver in which he played the character of Maurice Brass, a career criminal and hardman, associated with a family of criminals involved in the kidnap of the wife of Detective Constable Brian Cooney, a Flying Squad driver.

Between 1975 and 1988, Henry played his best-known role of Benny Hawkins, a handyman in Crossroads. In 1977, Henry recorded "Benny's Theme" with the Mayson Glen Orchestra for Pye Records. It peaked at no. 39 in the UK Singles Chart in January 1978. He was in character as Benny in the song, but spoke rather than sang.

Henry made a guest appearance on the Central Television game show Bullseye, presented by Jim Bowen, on 11 February 1985. He scored 215 and raised £215 for charity.

His country-boy style gained him the part of Peter Stevens in The Archers for a time. Henry's post-Crossroads career included minor stage roles and the running of a nightclub in Whitchurch, Shropshire, but, in 1994, he returned to television briefly in a tribute to Crossroads, called 30 Years On. In 2003, he returned to acting on TV in an episode of the British medical soap opera Doctors. He then played the regular character Frank, a baker's delivery man and later attempted rapist, in the penultimate series of the ITV1 prison drama Bad Girls. Returning to the stage in 2009, he appeared in a touring version of Run for Your Wife and in the following year portrayed Tony Hancock in the play Hancock's Finest Hour. In October 2017, Henry appeared on Pointless Celebrities alongside Shaun Williamson. They won the jackpot.

== Recognition ==
In a 2002 interview, Henry said that the public still loved Benny and that during a shopping trip, he returned to his car to find someone had left a piece of paper on it saying, "Benny, we miss you." The slang phrase "throwing a benny" refers to someone having a temper tantrum and may originate from Henry's Crossroads character.

The comic actor Ronnie Barker revealed in his later years that he had suggested Henry for casting as his cellmate Lennie Godber in the sitcom Porridge, but that Richard Beckinsale was chosen instead. Henry's intended portrayal was the reason the character came from Birmingham.

In the 2023, ITVX miniseries Nolly, which dramatised the life of his former Crossroads colleague Noele Gordon, Henry was portrayed by Lloyd Griffith.

== Personal life ==
Henry and his wife Sheila had a son, Anthony, and a daughter, Justine, who died as a result of a traffic collision at the age of 19.
