= Tony Adams (actor) =

Welsh actor (1940–2025)

- Born: Anthony Sawley Adams; 11 December 1940; Anglesey, Wales
- Died: 25 October 2025 (aged 84); Brighton, England
- Education: Italia Conti Academy of Theatre Arts
- Occupation: Actor
- Years active: 1951–2023

Anthony Sawley Adams (11 December 1940 – 25 October 2025) was a Welsh actor, known for his performances in two British television soap operas.

== Early life ==
Adams was born in Anglesey, Wales, on 11 December 1940, to Winifred Brown, a sportswoman and aviator. In 1930, she had been the first woman to win the King's Cup Air Race around England.

Adams trained as an actor at the Italia Conti Stage School. As a child he appeared on the London stage, notably alongside the young Kenneth Williams in a production of Peter Pan at the Scala Theatre. Other stage appearances included a starring role opposite Cheryl Kennedy in a West End revival of The Boy Friend, and he also appeared on the original cast album released with that production. He also appeared with the Royal Shakespeare Company, and in pantomime with David Essex.

== Career ==
Adams made his name as Dr Neville Bywaters in the 1970s soap General Hospital. He also appeared in the Doctor Who serial The Green Death (1973) as Elgin; however, he became ill with peritonitis during filming and could not complete the serial.

In November 1978, Adams moved on to a role in Crossroads, as accountant Adam Chance, who soon became a major character. It is for this role that he is best known. In September 1987, Adams decided to leave the programme. The announcement was made that the series would end in April 1988, and Adams stayed to the end. He was one of the cast members who returned in the 2001 revival of the series, though his character was later killed off in a fire. He also appeared in a one-off DVD made in 2014.

In late 2004, Adams appeared in the stage version of Chitty Chitty Bang Bang at the London Palladium theatre where he played Grandpa Potts.

In 2023, Adams appeared in a cameo role in the ITVX miniseries Nolly, which dramatised the life of his former Crossroads colleague Noele Gordon, and in which Adams himself was portrayed by Augustus Prew.

== Personal life and death ==
In 2013, aged 72, Adams began suffering from osteoarthritis, which he speculated might have resulted from eating an excess of seafood, especially prawns.

Adams died at Royal Sussex County Hospital in Brighton, England, on 25 October 2025, at the age of 84.

== Filmography ==
=== Film ===
Year	Film	Role	Notes
1951	The Magic Box	Boy	Uncredited
1953	The Enchanted Garret	Bill Banks	TV film
1955	Reluctant Bride		
1955	Touch and Go	Teenager	Uncredited
1964	Kiss Me Kate		TV film
1971	A Lizard in a Woman's Skin	Policeman	Uncredited
1971	Villain	Man	Uncredited
1973	The Godmothers	Vito	
1977	The Quality Connections	Nigel	Short film
1980	Hardly Working	Eddie the Clown	
1986	Aladdin	Monty Siracusa	

=== Television ===
Year	Title	Role	Notes
1966	Crossroads	Mr. Perkins	2 episodes
1972	The Two Ronnies	Brutus	Episode: Series 2, Episode 5
1972	Crown Court	Brian Parker	Episode: Conspiracy: Part Three
1972–1979	General Hospital	Dr. Neville Bywaters	Series regular; 304 episodes
1973	Doctor Who	Elgin	Episodes: The Green Death
1973	Play of the Week	Prince Damian	Episode: Queen of Hearts
1978–2002	Crossroads	Adam Chance	Series regular; 260 episodes
1986	Hale and Pace	Prince Charming	Episode: Christmas Extravaganza
1992	The Upper Hand	Donald Crenshaw	Episode: You Shall Go to the Ball
2001	The Grimleys	Doctor	Episode: The Big Sleep
2003	The Afternoon Play	Agency Supremo	Episode: Turkish Delight
2006	Doctors	Edgar Price	Episode: Ghost in the Machine
