= Noele Gordon =

English stage, film, television actress (1919–1985)

- Born: Joan Noele Gordon; 25 December 1919; East Ham, Essex, England
- Died: 14 April 1985 (aged 65); Birmingham, West Midlands, England
- Resting place: St Mary's Churchyard, Ross-on-Wye, Herefordshire, England
- Occupation: Actress
- Years active: 1945–1984

Joan Noele Gordon (25 December 1919 – 14 April 1985) was an English actress and television presenter, of Scottish descent. She played the role of Meg Mortimer (originally Richardson, later Ryder) in the long-running British soap opera Crossroads from 1964 to 1981, with a brief return in 1983.

== Early life ==
Gordon was born on 25 December 1919, at 139 Clements Road, East Ham, Essex (now in the London Borough of Newham). Her father, who was from Scotland, was an engineer in the Merchant Navy when she was born. She was given the middle name of Noele because she was born on Christmas Day. After attending convent school in Ilford, she was taught to dance by Maude Wells and later spent several years living in Southend-on-Sea. She made her first public appearance at the East Ham Palace and shortly afterwards, sang "Dear Little Jammy Face" at a restaurant in London. After this event, her mother and her aunt were keen for her to begin a stage career. Gordon was credited as the first woman to be seen on colour television sets, as she took part, as a teenager, in John Logie Baird's colour transmission tests in 1938.

== Career ==
=== Early career ===
Gordon attended RADA, appearing in repertory theatres and the West End stage. She was a soubrette in musical theatre roles during the 1940s and 1950s, and made her West End debut at the London Hippodrome in 1943 as Maggie Watson in Cole Porter's Let's Face It!; replacing Joyce Barbour in that part. She returned to that theatre later that year as Louise Panache (aka "Panny") in the musical The Lisbon Story from June 1943 to July 1944. In April 1949, she took the role of Meg Brockie in the original London production of Brigadoon for 685 performances at Her Majesty's Theatre. She stayed with the show for a national tour. In 1953, she toured as Mrs Sally Adams in Call Me Madam after Billie Adams had played the role in the London season at the Coliseum.

She appeared in two British films, 29 Acacia Avenue (1945) and Lisbon Story (1946) in minor parts.

In 1954, Gordon spent a year in New York City learning American television production at New York University. Her stage career came to a halt in 1955, when she joined Associated Television in London, where she presented their first-ever programme, The Weekend Show. She worked behind the scenes as Head of Lifestyle programmes. Gordon helped Reg Watson and Ned Sherrin launch ATV Midlands in 1956.

As well as being a producer, Gordon became a presenter for the new Birmingham-based service. Her first television appearance for ATV in the Midlands, Tea With Noele Gordon, was the first popular ITV chat show, and while presenting this series, she became the first woman to interview a British Prime Minister, when Harold Macmillan was in office. Initially commissioned as an emergency schedule filler, the show became so successful that Gordon gave up her executive position to concentrate on presenting. She then moved on to present a daily live entertainment show, Lunchbox, an early daytime programme.

=== Crossroads ===
In the summer of 1964, Lunchbox came to an end after more than 2,000 episodes. It made way for a new daily soap opera, Crossroads, in which Gordon played the role of motel owner Meg Richardson (later Meg Mortimer), a part that had been developed with Gordon in mind, as she was still under contract to Lew Grade's ATV.

First in 1969, and over the following decade, she won the TV Times award for portraying the "most compulsive character" on eight occasions. Crossroads also turned Noele Gordon into a gay icon.

Gordon was the only member of the Crossroads cast who had a permanent contract; all other cast members were booked on an ad hoc basis.

Gordon stayed with the programme until she was sacked in 1981, when ATV was in the process of being re-constituted into a new company, Central Independent Television. Central was obliged to continue ATV's commitment to Crossroads; however, Head of Programmes Charles Denton and Head of Drama Margaret Matheson wanted to end the soap opera in favour of more expensive and lavish drama productions. The decision to dismiss Gordon—the show's most popular cast member—was taken in the hope that viewers would desert the show, giving Central a valid excuse to axe it. The British press had stated that Denton was the one responsible for the sacking of Gordon, though it was later revealed that Jack Barton, producer and head writer of Crossroads, was responsible for Gordon's sacking. Margaret Matheson had stated that it was not Denton or herself who sacked Gordon. According to Denton, "I simply carried out the request of the Crossroads producer (Barton) to dismiss her. I took the flak as that was part of my job to protect my staff." Gordon returned to Crossroads in August 1983 for two episodes.

In 1985, Matheson's successor Ted Childs ordered Crossroads to be revamped; one element in the updating of the show was its renaming as Crossroads Motel. The programme's new look was designed to bring back Gordon on an "as and when" basis, starting with a three-month stint from April 1985. Gordon's return as Meg was devised by the new producer, Phillip Bowman, who himself ended the involvement with the series of regulars Ronald Allen and Sue Lloyd. Gordon, who had already appeared in 3,521 episodes, was too ill to make the planned return.

=== Later career ===
After the termination of her Crossroads contract, Gordon starred in the musical Gypsy at Leicester's Haymarket Theatre, followed by a revival of Irving Berlin's musical Call Me Madam, touring the Midlands. It then moved to the Victoria Palace Theatre in the West End, where it ran for only 88 performances. Her last stage role was in No, No, Nanette at Plymouth's Theatre Royal. She became ill during the run and had to be replaced.

In an interview she gave to TV Times in 1981, Gordon announced that she might, once her stage work had come to an end, take up the offer of returning to presenting. In the same interview, she commented that a future role as a breakfast television presenter was being negotiated. She would, however, not return to television full-time because of her theatre commitments.

== Personal life, illness and death ==
Gordon never married. She had been engaged to Captain Robertson Crichton (later a High Court judge) in 1941, but he broke off the engagement shortly before the wedding was due to take place, allegedly because of his family's disapproval of her occupation.

For many years, in the 1960s and early 1970s, she stayed in a large white-washed Georgian manor house at Weir End, near Ross-on-Wye, beside the A40 road to Monmouth; her mother Joan (1893–1979) lived in the house and Gordon joined her at weekends.

It became known in 1982 that Gordon was suffering from cancer, for which she underwent two major operations. She retired to her home in Birmingham, where she died in 1985 of stomach cancer, at the age of 65. She was buried in the churchyard of St Mary's parish church in Ross-on-Wye, next to her mother. Tony Adams, who played Adam Chance in Crossroads, commented just after her death that "There has never been a star of Crossroads, although Nolly was Crossroads."

== Legacy ==
A televised drama, Nolly, with Helena Bonham Carter playing Gordon, written by Russell T Davies and directed by Peter Hoar, was made by ITV Studios. It depicts her time in Crossroads and her sacking from the show. It first aired in February 2023.
