= Oliver Hutchinson =

Northern Irish businessman (1891–1944)

Oliver George Hutchinson
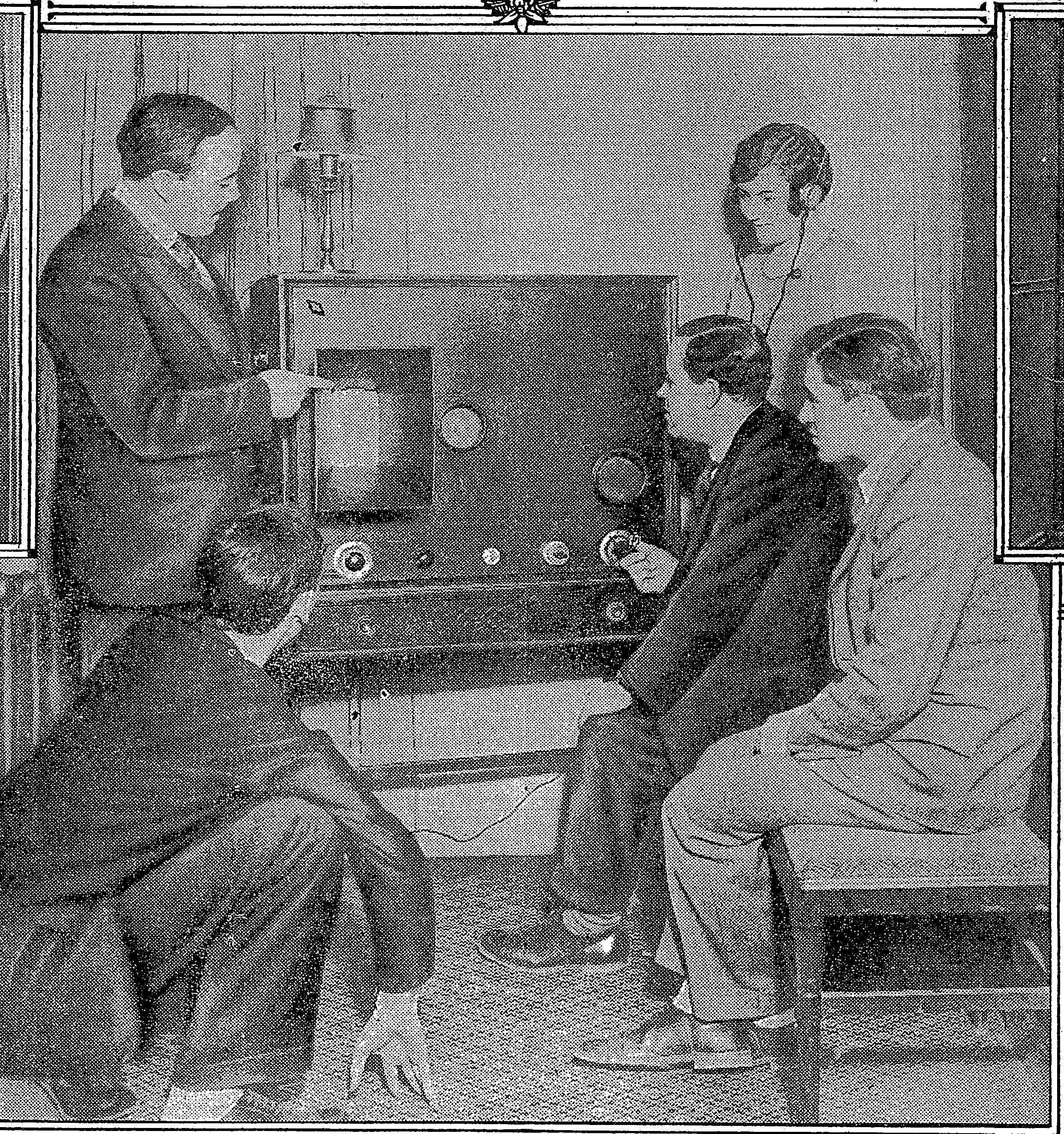
- Hutchinson, standing at left, with an early television receiver, 1928
- Born: 6 May 1891; Belfast, Ireland
- Died: April 1944 (aged 52)
- Education: Belfast Technical School
- Occupation: Businessman
- Father: Samuel Corbett Hutchinson

Oliver George Hutchinson (6 May 1891 – April 1944) was a British businessman who played a key role in popularising John Logie Baird's invention of television. Hutchinson had met Baird while both were apprentices at the Argyll Motor Works in Glasgow. During the First World War, he served as an officer in the Army Cyclist Corps and Tank Corps. After the war Hutchinson developed several successful businesses in London, including one selling soap. After meeting Baird by chance he agreed to support his work on the first television system. Hutchinson provided funds and publicised the operation, and even appeared as the subject of the first public demonstration of the technology in 1926. Hutchinson was later joint managing director of the Baird Television Development Company and was present in New York when the first trans-Atlantic broadcast was made in 1928.

== Early life ==
Hutchinson was born in Belfast on 6 May 1891. He was the son of Samuel Corbett Hutchinson of Combermere House, Hillsborough, County Down, who had a successful business in the motor engineering trade. After studying at Belfast Technical School, Hutchinson moved to Glasgow to work as an apprentice at the Argyll Motor Works. It was there that he first met Scotsman John Logie Baird, a fellow apprentice.

After the outbreak of the First World War, Hutchinson volunteered to serve as an officer in the Royal Inniskilling Fusiliers. He was commissioned with the temporary rank of second lieutenant in that regiment's 6th Battalion on 5 March 1915. Hutchinson transferred to the Army Cyclist Corps on 10 June 1915. He held the temporary rank of lieutenant when he was promoted to the temporary rank of captain on 19 August 1916. By the war's end Hutchinson had transferred to the Tank Corps.

== Television ==
After the war, Hutchinson lived in London, where he developed several successful businesses. By then, Baird had also moved to London. By coincidence, both men became involved in the soap industry, with Hutchinson's "Rapid Washer" product competing with Baird's "Speedy Cleaner". The two men met by chance on The Strand in 1922, when Hutchinson recognised Baird from their apprentice days, and they took tea together. Baird told Hutchinson about the experiments that he was then carrying out to develop the first television. Hutchinson saw the potential, and provided Baird with funds for equipment and premises.

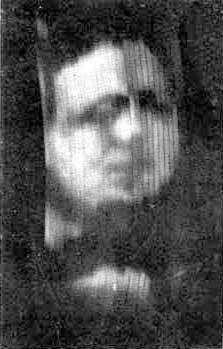
The earliest photograph of a television picture, Hutchinson in 1926

Hutchinson joined Baird's Television Limited in mid-1925 as business manager. With English journalist Sydney Moseley, Hutchinson helped generate interest in the invention by writing positive press articles predicting it would become as successful as radio. Baird enjoyed his first success with his television in 1925, televising a dummy, Stooky Bill, and a living person, an office boy from a nearby business, on 2 October 1925. These experiments were conducted privately by Baird in his laboratory. The first live demonstration took place on 26 January 1926 for members of the Royal Institution. During the demonstration, Baird transmitted the live image of Hutchinson's face as a 3.5-by-2-inch (89 mm × 51 mm) picture. This is regarded as the first successful demonstration of the technology, with Baird's earlier work having resulted in little more than silhouettes. Hutchinson appeared in the first successful photograph taken of a television picture, made by Lafayette Ltd and published in The Electrician in June 1926.

Hutchinson founded the Baird Television Development Company in 1927 to acquire the rights to television from Television Limited and became its joint managing director. He persuaded Edward Manville and Oliver Russell, 2nd Baron Ampthill, to join the board. In 1928, Hutchinson travelled to Hartsdale, New York, with engineer Ben Clapp. The pair demonstrated a television system that successfully received moving images transmitted from London in the first trans-Atlantic television broadcast.

Hutchinson and Moseley were critical in persuading the BBC to begin experiments with television transmission from 1929. Baird Television Development was acquired by Cinema Television Limited in 1940. Hutchinson died in April 1944.
