= William Edward Taynton =

First human being to have image transmitted by television

William Edward Taynton (2 August 1904 – May 1973) was an English office worker who became the first human being in history to have his image transmitted by television. On 2 October 1925, while working as an office boy in London, he was recruited by inventor John Logie Baird to serve as the live subject for his mechanical television experiments, following the successful transmission of a ventriloquist's dummy.

== The 1925 experiment ==
Taynton was an employee of a firm at 22 Frith Street in Soho, the same building where Baird maintained his laboratory. After Baird achieved a breakthrough in transmitting the "halftone" image of a puppet named Stooky Bill he sought a human subject to verify that the apparatus could capture living people. Baird "almost dragged" Taynton to come and act as a subject that would provide the necessary motion. Despite the intense heat from the apparatus, Taynton remained in place long enough for Baird to achieve the first true television picture. When Baird asked Taynton for his opinion of the picture he replied that it was "very crude". For his contribution, he received a payment of half a crown, which is cited as the first "television fee" ever paid to a performer.

== Early life ==
Taynton's birth was registered in Islington in late 1905, though his later records cite a birth date of 2 August 1904. He was the son of Charles Edwin Taynton. He largely remained out of the public eye following the experiment although did appear on broadcasts and articles talking about the experiment. He married in Bromley in 1941. He died in 1973.
