= William Leiper =

Scottish architect (1839–1916)

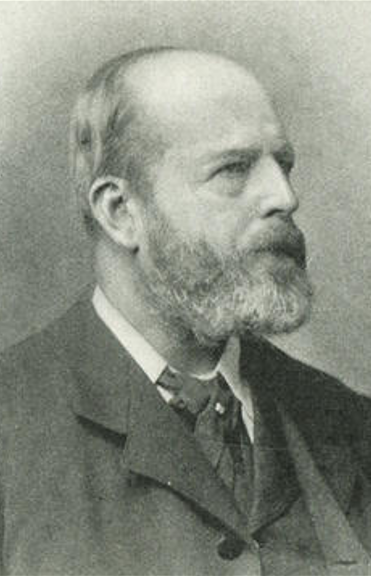
William Leiper c. 1890

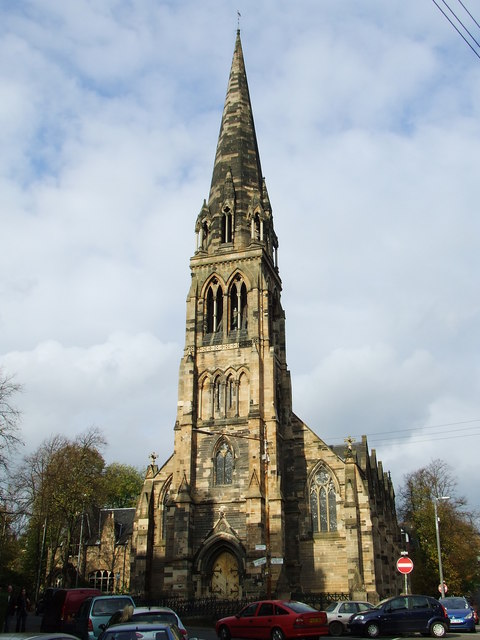
Dowanhill Church

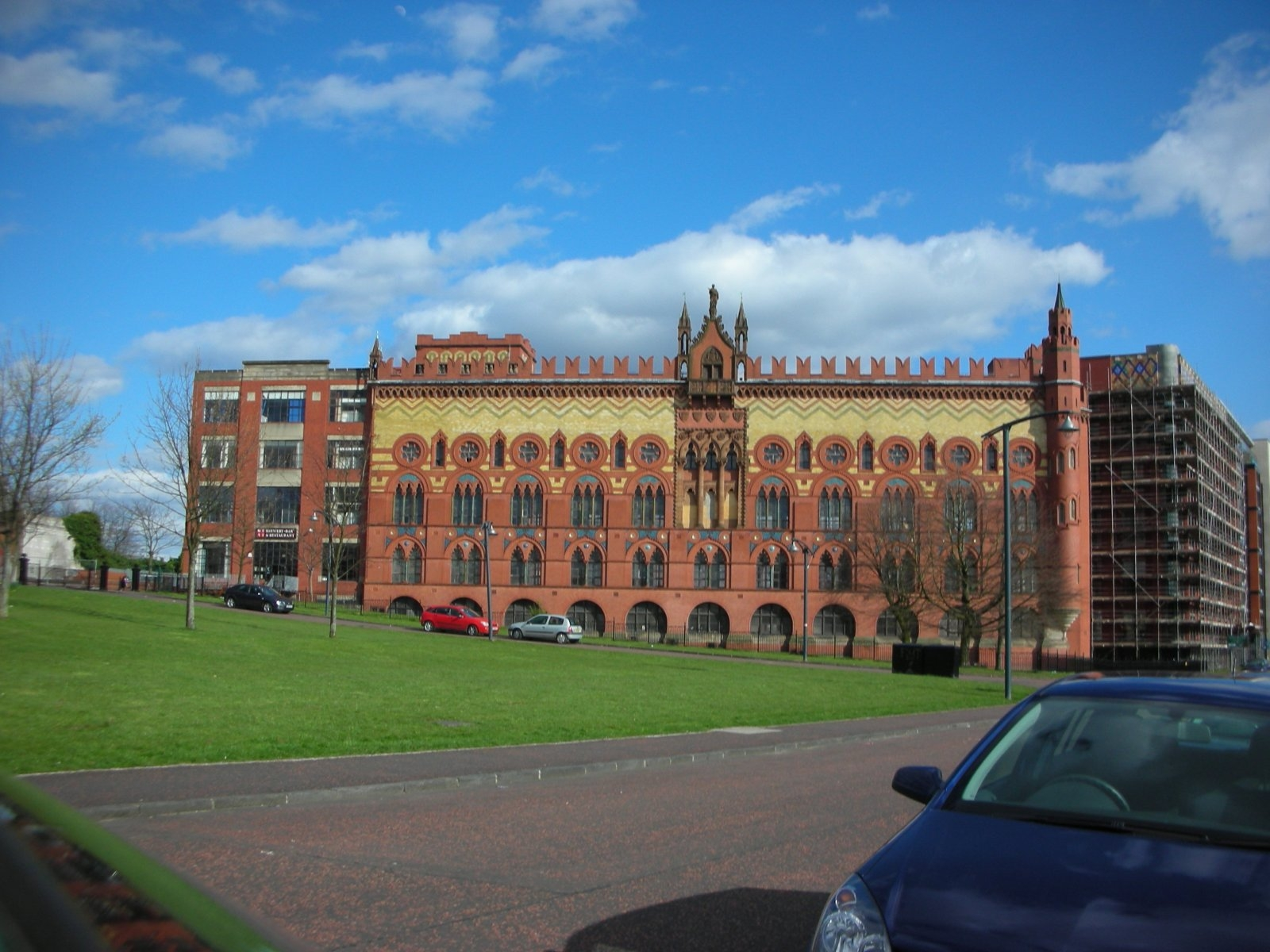
Templeton's Carpet Factory

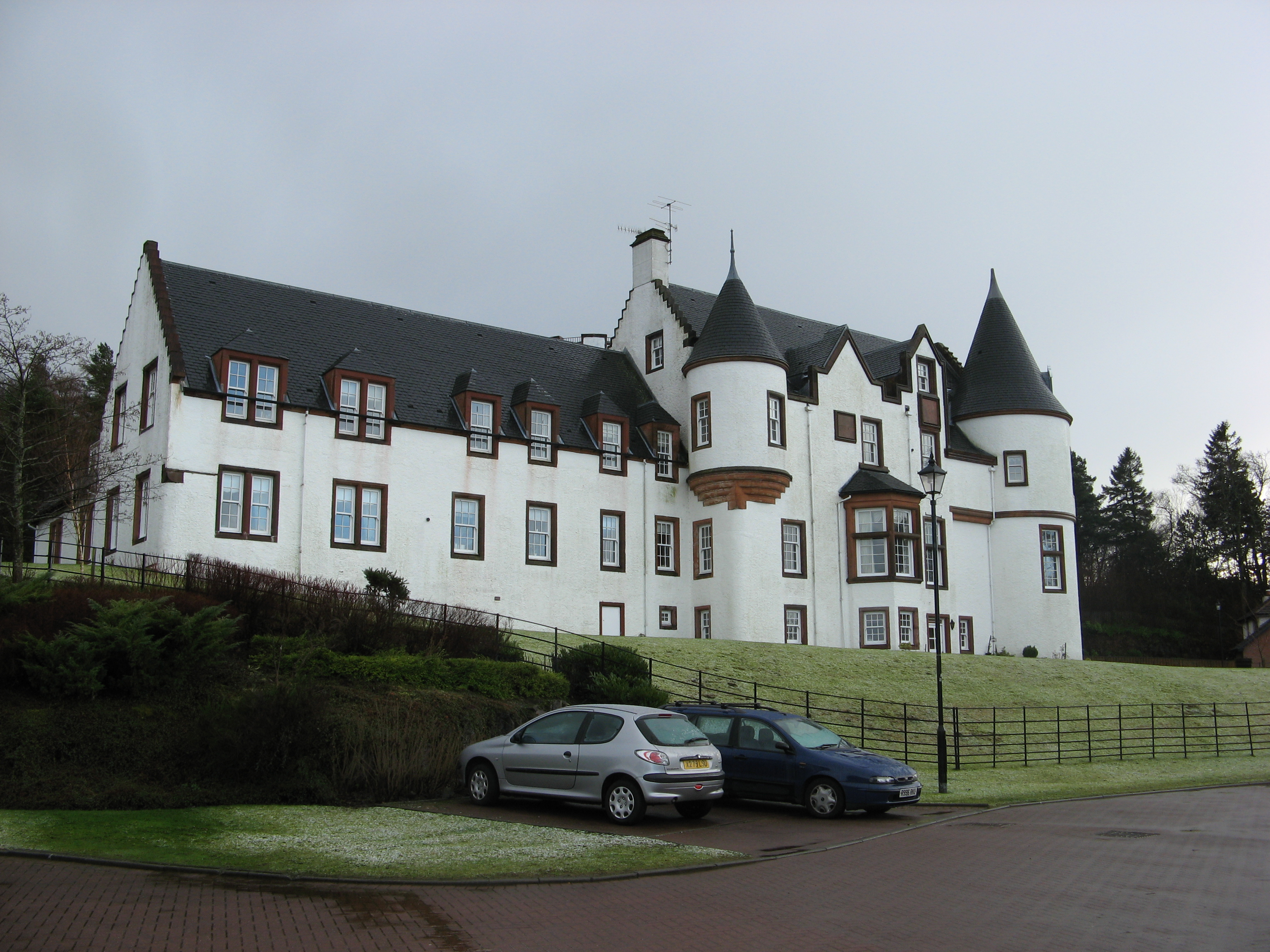
Auchenbothie House (1898), a private residence in Kilmacolm

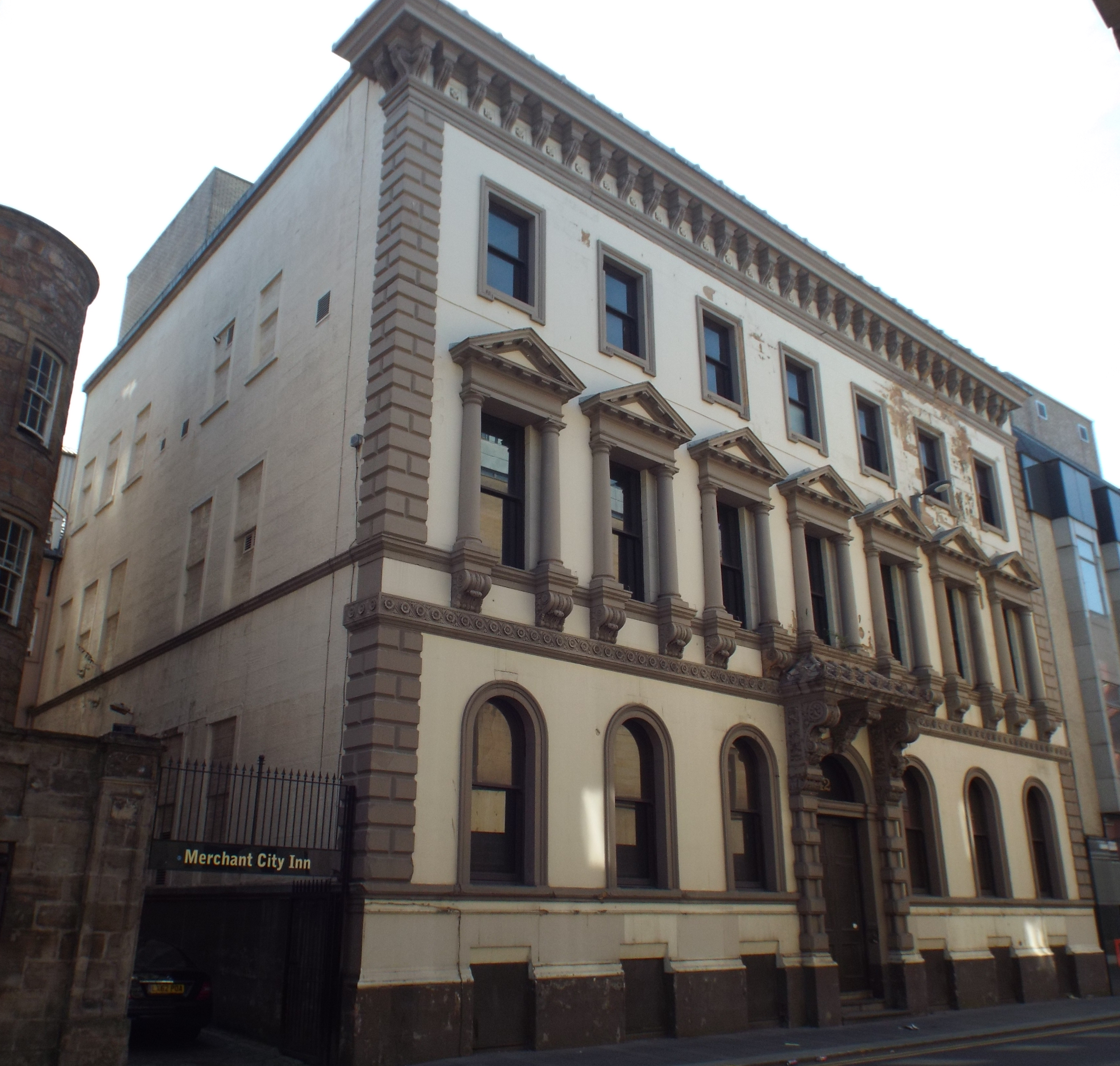
42 Virginia Street, Glasgow

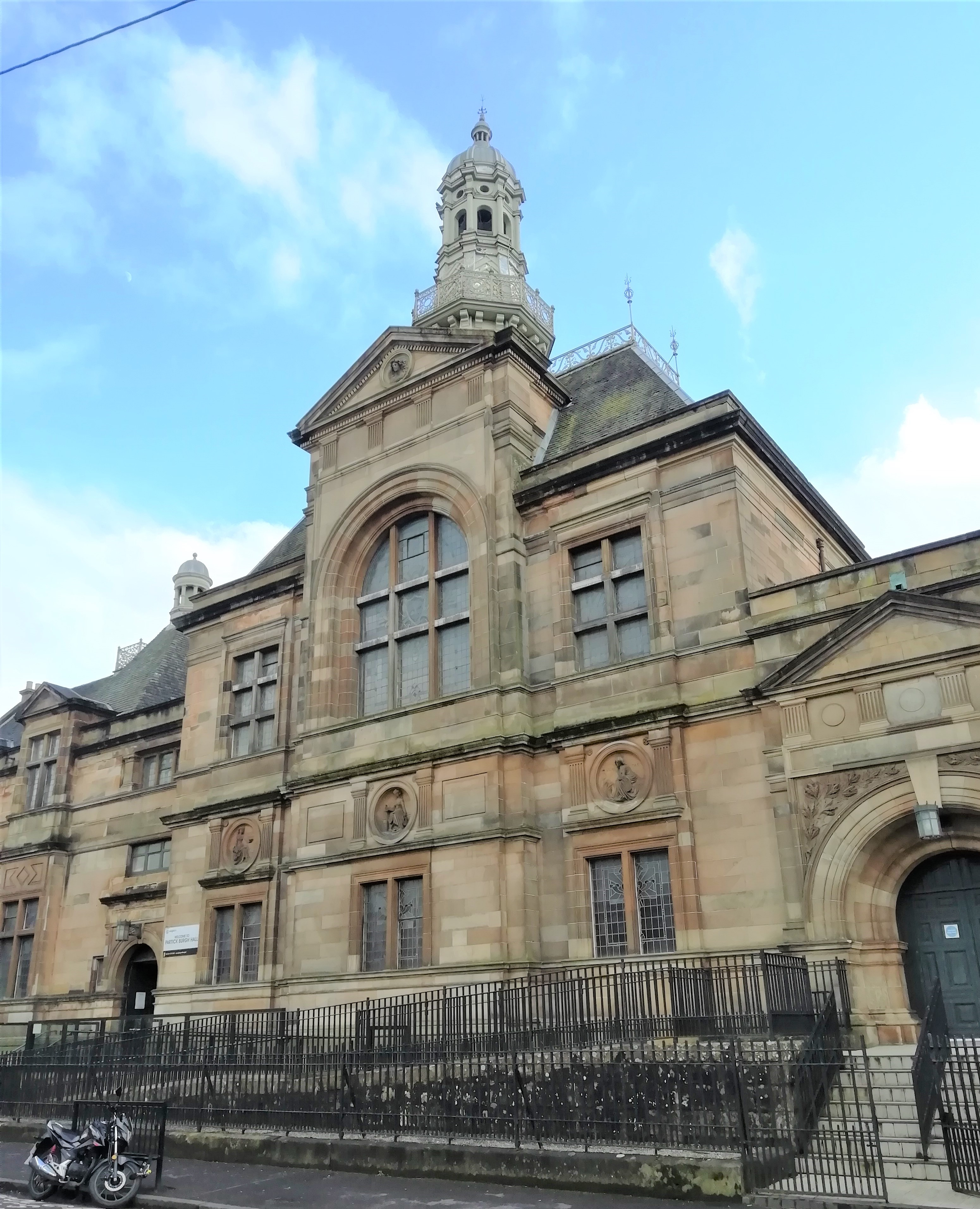
Partick Burgh Halls

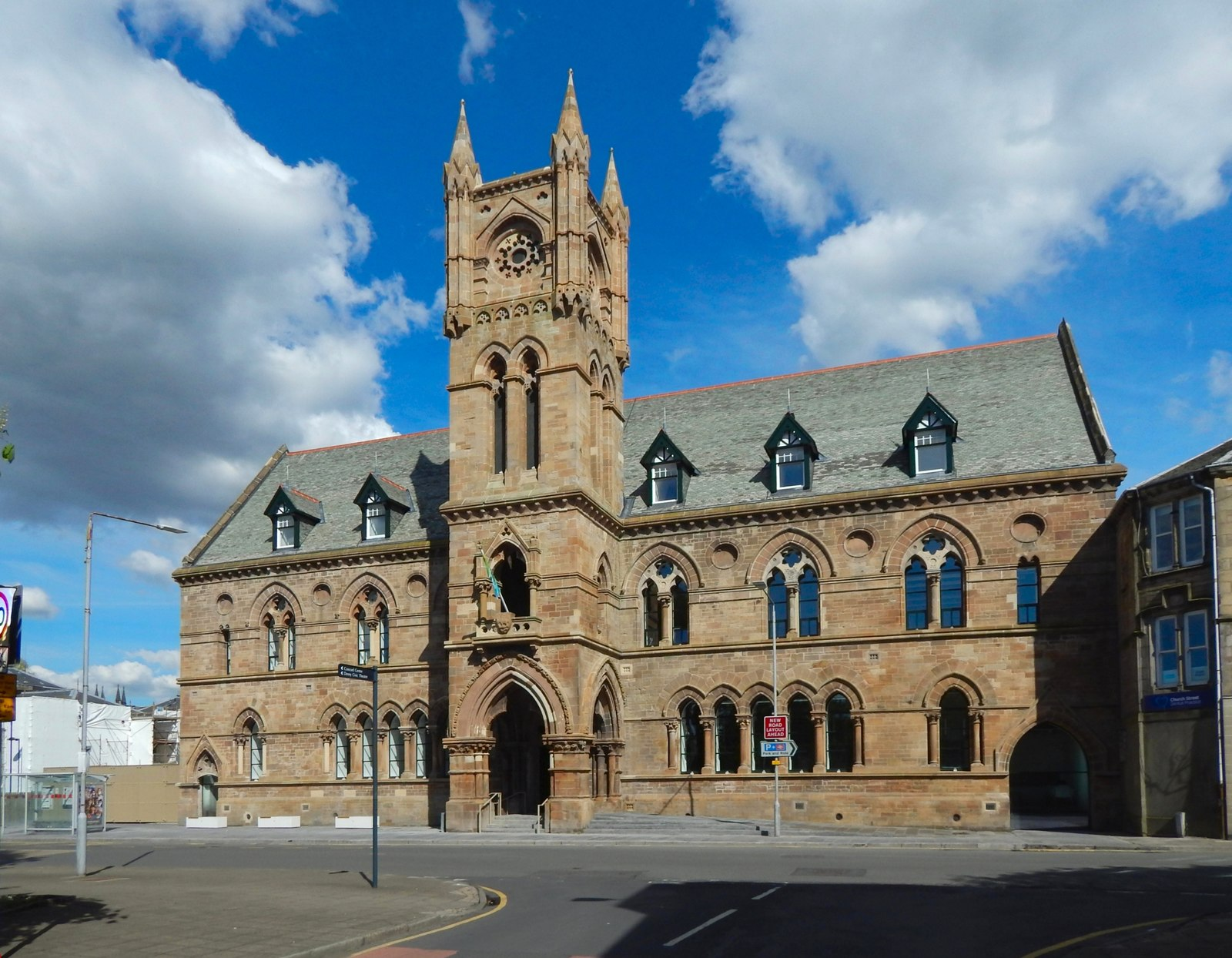
Dumbarton Burgh Halls

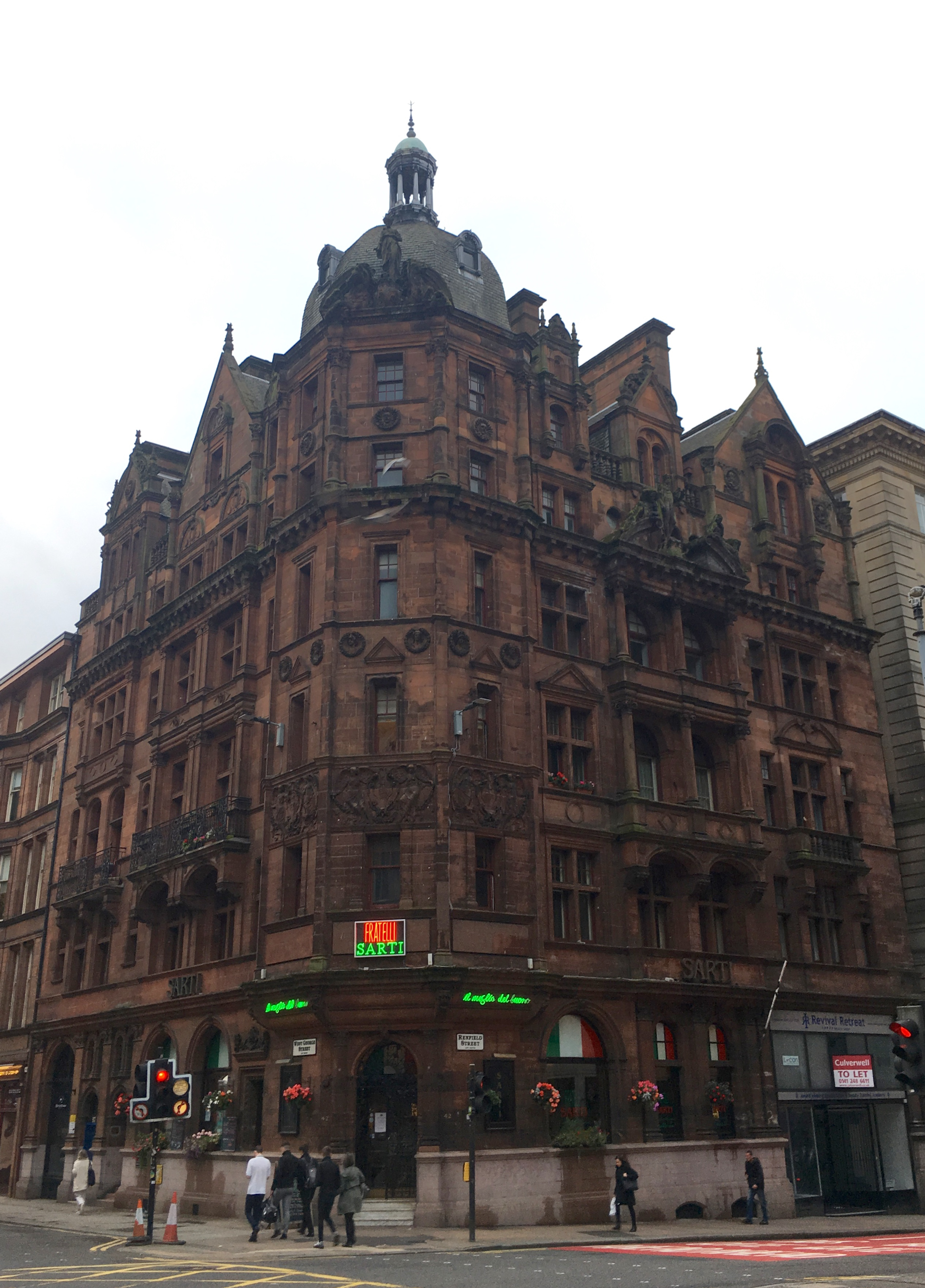
Sun Life offices in Glasgow

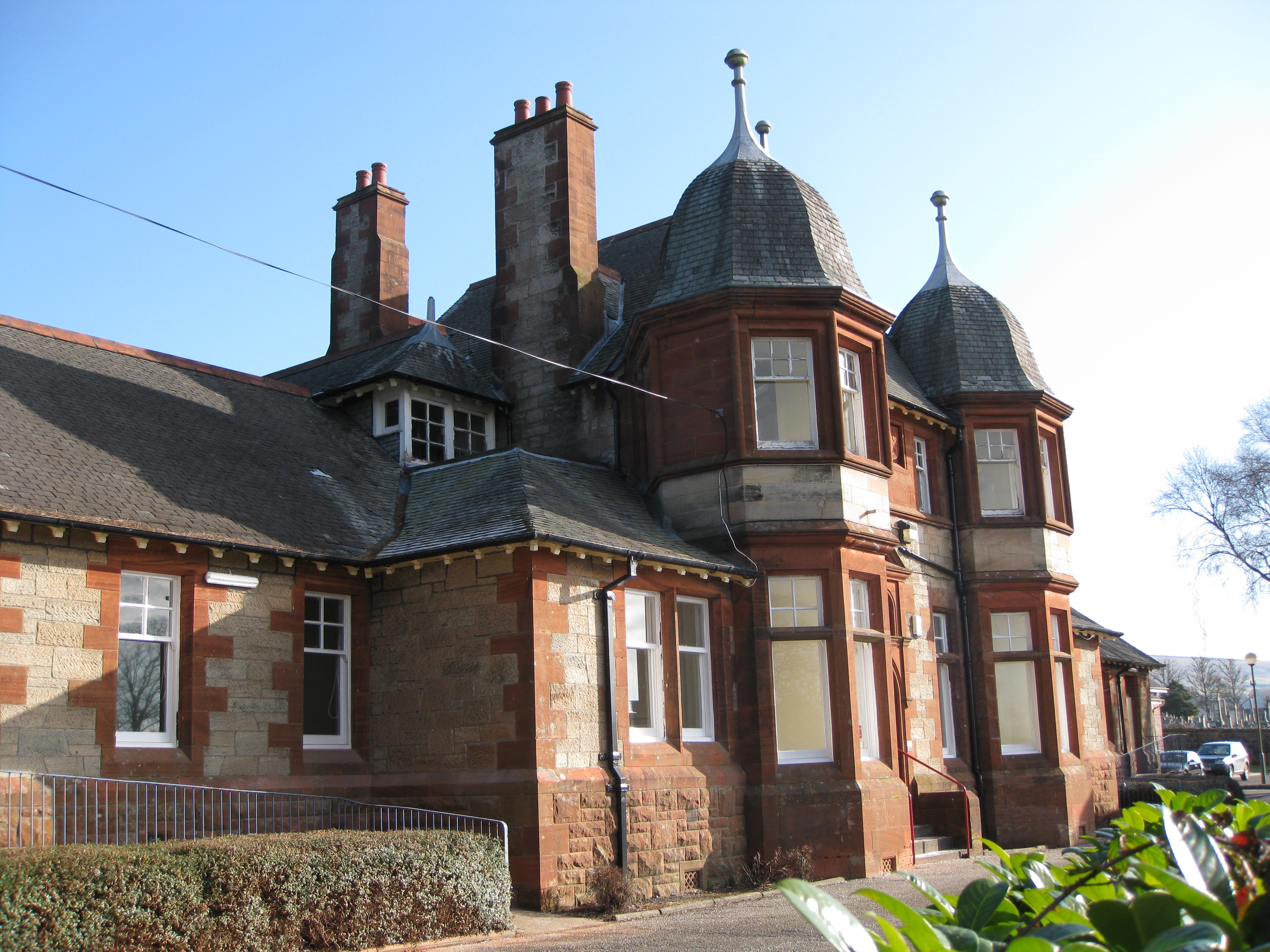
Victoria Infirmary in Helensburgh

William Leiper FRIBA RSA (1839–1916) was a Scottish architect known particularly for his domestic architecture in and around the town of Helensburgh. In addition, he produced a small amount of fine ecclesiastical and commercial architecture in Glasgow and the Scottish Lowlands. He was also an accomplished watercolour artist, and from the late 1870s spent much spare time painting in oils and watercolours.

== Life ==
Leiper was born in Glasgow on 21 May 1839 the eldest son of William Leiper who ran a small private school teaching writing and arithmetic at 187 George Street in the city centre. His mother was Jane Mellis. The family lived at 70 Renfrew Street.

He was educated at his father's primary school at 187 George St then at Glasgow High School. From 1855 to 1859, he was apprenticed to the newly formed architectural firm of Boucher & Cousland at 5 Bath Street working on Renfield Free Church. He then completed his training in London with W. White then J. L. Pearson. Under Andrew Heiton of Perth he was project architect for the Findlater Church in Dublin in 1862. By 1864, he had returned to Glasgow and was in partnership for three years with Robert Grieve Melvin.

A major stepping stone in Leiper's career came in 1864 when, aged 26, in the same year of setting up his own practice, he won the commission to build Dowanhill Church in the Hyndland district of north-west Glasgow. In this project he commissioned John Mossman to work on the sculptural details and Daniel Cottier to work on the stained glass, and continued a relationship with both until the end of his career.

From 1874, he received multiple commissions from the United Presbyterian Church of Scotland and may be considered either a member of the church or some other close connection.

In his native Glasgow, Leiper was responsible for Templeton's Carpet Factory and the Sun Life Building on West George Street, which housed Alexander Reid's famous art gallery, the banqueting hall of Glasgow City Chambers as well as a number of churches. He also had a reputation for designing residential properties in the city and nearby. His most significant works are primarily part of the Arts and Crafts Movement or in the Gothic Revival style.

Leiper was responsible for the design of St Columba's Church and Auchenbothie House in the village of Kilmacolm, Renfrewshire, and a number of works in Helensburgh, Dunbartonshire. One of his residential commissions became the most expensive house sold in the latter town in 2008.

He designed the interior of the Russian imperial yacht, Livadia and the Romanian luxury steamship NMS Regele Carol I.

In 1891, he was unsuccessful in his competition entry for the Kelvingrove Art Gallery and Museum and in 1895 was unsuccessful in the competition for the North British Railway Hotel in Edinburgh.

He lived the last 40 years of his life at "Terpersie", a villa at 2 Upper Sutherland Street in Helensburgh. In 1903 he got serious blood poisoning and never fully recovered. He retired in 1909 and died at home of a cardiac haemorrhage on 27 May 1916. He is buried with his parents in Sighthill Cemetery in Glasgow. The monument is of his own design.

== Artistic recognition ==
A portrait of Leiper by Colin Hunter is held at Aberdeen Art Gallery.

In 2016, a three-month exhibition of Leiper's work in Glasgow was open to the public under the title of the Leiper Gallery.

== Main works ==
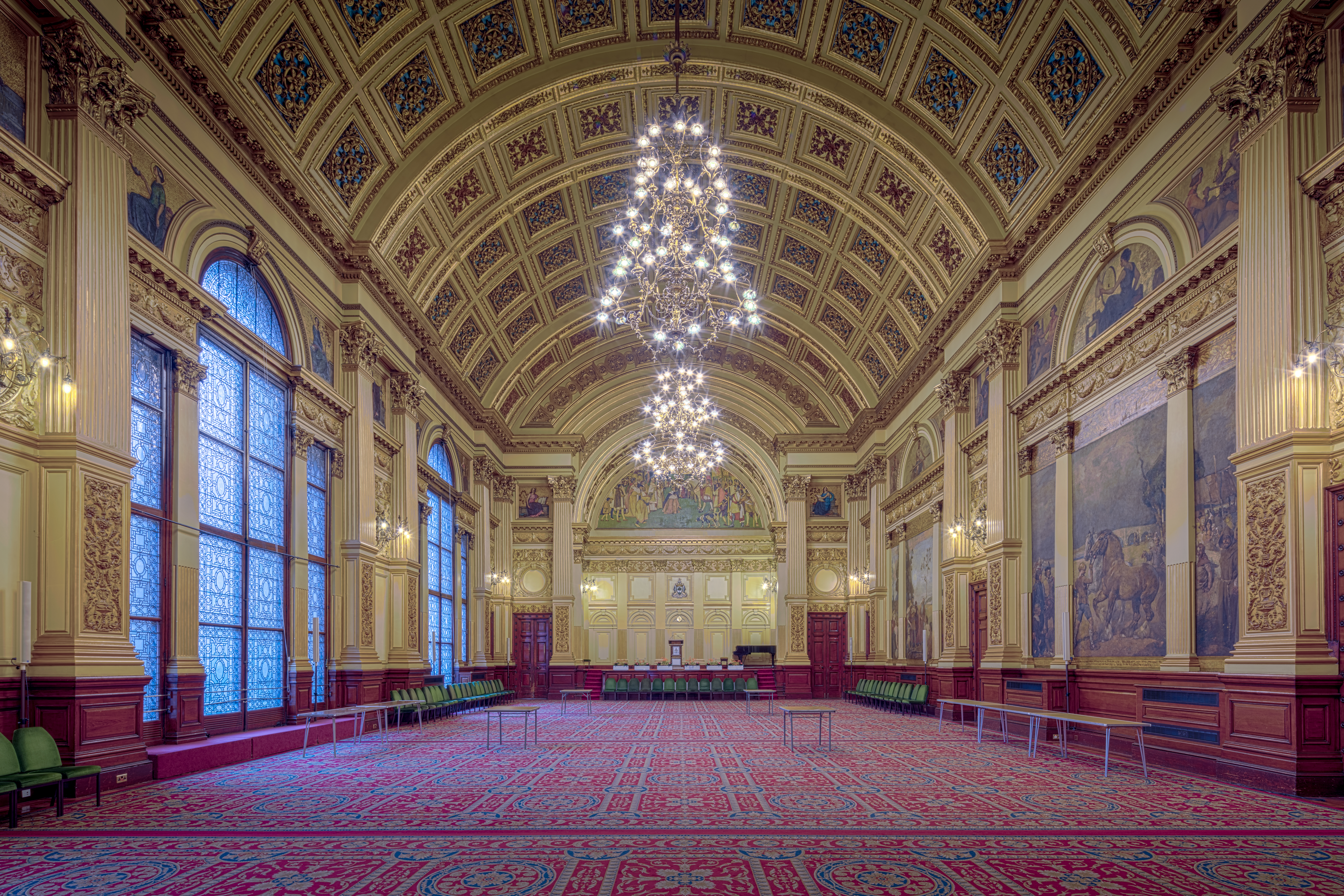
The Banqueting Hall of Glasgow City Chambers

- Dowanhill Parish Church (1865)
- Dumbarton Academy (1865)
- Dumbarton Burgh Halls (1865) plus repairs and alterations in 1883
- Kirktonhill House, Dumbarton (1866)
- Offices for Glasgow Gas Lighting Company, 42 Virginia Street (1867) working with William Melvin
- Colearn Castle near Auchterarder (1869)
- Lindsaylands, villa near Biggar (1869)
- Gravestone to his parents in Sighthill Cemetery (1870)
- Cairndhu villa in Helensburgh (1871) "the finest of his villas"
- Cornhill House near Biggar (1871)
- Redholm villa in Helensburgh (1871)
- Bonnyton villa in Helensburgh (1871)
- Cornhill Farm and Steading, Coulter, Lanarkshire (1871)
- Rannochlea House in Pollokshields (1871)
- Thurloe, villa for himself, in Helensburgh (1871)
- Partick Burgh Halls (1872)
- Dalmore villa in Helensburgh (1873)
- Balgray House in Kelvinside (1873)
- Bloomgate UP Church in Lanark (1874)
- Bank Street UP Church in Brechin (1875)
- Belhaven UP Church, Dowanhill, Glasgow (1875)
- Camphill UP Church, Queen's Park, Glasgow (1875–1883), now a Baptist church
- Earnock House, Hamilton (1876/7)
- Whiteinch UP Church, Partick (1876) demolished to create the Clyde Tunnel
- Interior of SY Livadia (1879) yacht for Russian aristocracy, made by John Elder & Co. in Govan
- Ruthven Towers near Auchterarder (1880) now a care home
- Castlepark, Lanark (1880)
- Cairndhu stable block, Helensburgh (1881)
- Wheatpark house in Lanark, remodelling and cottage addition (1882)
- Grave of Very Rev Norman Macleod, Milton of Campsie (1882)
- Remodelling of Ardvuela villa at 20 Queen St in Helensburgh (1883)
- Aros villa in Rhu (1883)
- Torwood villa in Helensburgh (1883) plus extension in 1891 when renamed Claredon – now a school
- Dorlecote villa at 134 Sinclair Street in Helensburgh (1883) later renamed Albion Lodge
- Tordarroch, 117 Sinclair St in Helensburgh (1883)
- Kinlochmoidart House and lodge houses (1884)
- Ruyton Park in Shrewsbury (1884) Leiper's only English work (built 1887–1889)
- External remodelling of Dormira villa in Partickhill (1885) interior by Daniel Cottier
- Hyndland Parish Church (1885)
- Jubilee Gates, Victoria Park, Glasgow (1887) paid for by the "Ladies of Partick"
- Ganavan villa in Oban (1888)
- Catholic Apostolic Church, Glasgow (1889)
- Monument to Jessie Montgomery Lang, Glasgow Necropolis (1889)
- Sun Life Insurance Offices, corner of West George Street and Renfield Street in Glasgow (1889) Leiper's largest office commission – sculpture is by William Birnie Rhind
- Templeton's Carpet Factory at Glasgow Green (1889)
- Kelly House, Wemyss Bay (1890) destroyed by fire in 1912
- Moredun House and lodge in Paisley (1890)
- Grave of Hugh Kerr (1808–1891), tobacco merchant in Kentucky, and separate monument to his wife Jane Kerr, Helensburgh Cemetery (1891)
- Earnock Cottage, Hamilton (1892)
- St Leomards villa in Gillburn Rd in Kilmacolm (1893)
- Victoria Infirmary, Helensburgh (1893) plus 1899 and 1902 extensions
- Westbreak villa on Park Rd in Kilmacolm (1893)
- Grave of Rev George Jacque in Auchterarder Churchyard (1895)
- Brantwood villa in Helensburgh (1895)
- Primary School in Garelochhead (1895)
- Tighnabruaich House (1895)
- Remodelling of Knockderry Castle (1895) for the Templeton family
- Viewfield House and lodge, Stirling (1897)
- Auchenbothie House and estate buildings (1898) lodge later completed by Charles Rennie Mackintosh
- Dhuhill House lodge, Helensburgh (1898)
- Glasgow City Chambers – design and co-ordination of a highly ornate remodelling of the Banqueting Hall including murals by the Glasgow Boys (1898)
- Red Towers, Helensburgh (1898)
- Stable block at Redholm, Helensburgh (1898)
- Remodelling of Ballimore House in Otter Ferry, Loch Fyne (1899)
- Barnlongart, Ballimore Estate, Loch Fyne (1899)
- Interior work on NMS Regele Carol I (1899) for the Romanian Navy
- William Black Memorial, Duart Point, Mull (1899)
- Ard Choille house, Clynder (1900)
- Ard Luss villa, Helensburgh (1900) and 1908 extension
- Deroran villa in Stirling (1900)
- Watermill at Glendaruel House (1901)
- Mar Gate villa in Stirling (1901)
- Museum at Marden House, Helensburgh (1902)
- St James' Church, Kilmacolm (1902)
- Remodelling of Glendaruel Inn (1903)
- Morar House and outbuildings, Helensburgh (1903) restored by Lorn Macneal architect and finalist for Scottish Home Award 2021
- Offices at 153 St Vincent Street, Glasgow (1904)
- Argyll Mansions, shop and tenement on corner of Argyll Street and George Street in Oban (1905)
- Three villas at Rockbank in Helensburgh (1906)
- Uplands, 15 Abercromby Drive, Bridge of Allan (1907) restored 2020
- Polkemmet villa in Helensburgh (1908)
