= The Giggle =

303 – "The Giggle"
- Doctor Who episode
- Promotional poster

Cast
- Doctor: David Tennant – Fourteenth Doctor
- Companion: Catherine Tate – Donna Noble
- Others: Charlie De Melo – Charles Banerjee; Neil Patrick Harris – The Toymaker; John Mackay – John Logie Baird; Ross Gurney-Randall – Middle Aged Man; Alexander Devrient – Colonel Ibrahim; Ruth Madeley – Shirley Bingham; Jemma Redgrave – Kate Lethbridge-Stewart; Bonnie Langford – Melanie Bush; Glen Fox – Pilot; Tim Hudson – Edward Lawn Bridges; Aidan Cook – The Vlinx; Nicholas Briggs – Voice of the Vlinx; Lachele Carl – Trinity Wells; Leigh Lothian – Voice of Stooky Sue; Luke Featherston – The Toymaker Dance Double; Karl Collins – Shaun Temple; Jacqueline King – Sylvia Noble; Yasmin Finney – Rose Noble; Ncuti Gatwa – Fifteenth Doctor

Production
- Directed by: Chanya Button
- Written by: Russell T Davies
- Produced by: Vicki Delow
- Executive producers: Russell T Davies; Julie Gardner; Jane Tranter; Joel Collins; Phil Collinson
- Music by: Murray Gold
- Series: 2023 specials
- Running time: 62 minutes
- First broadcast: 9 December 2023

Chronology
← Preceded by "Wild Blue Yonder"	Followed by → "The Church on Ruby Road"

"The Giggle" is the third and final of the 60th anniversary specials of the British science fiction television programme Doctor Who, written by Russell T Davies, directed by Chanya Button and broadcast in the United Kingdom on BBC One on 9 December 2023. It features the final regular appearances of David Tennant as the Fourteenth Doctor and Catherine Tate as Donna Noble, introduces Ncuti Gatwa as the Fifteenth Doctor and guest stars Neil Patrick Harris as the Toymaker, a character last seen in The Celestial Toymaker (1966). The episode also features the return of Jemma Redgrave and Bonnie Langford as UNIT commander Kate Lethbridge-Stewart and Mel Bush, respectively.

Set directly after the events of "Wild Blue Yonder", the episode sees the Doctor, Donna, and UNIT confronting the return of the Doctor's old enemy, the Toymaker, who is behind a series of signals in a form of a "giggle" being transmitted, causing the human race to go insane over their opinions.

The episode was watched by 6.85 million viewers and received positive reviews from critics, who praised Harris’s performance and the writing, though the episode's "bi-generation" was met with a polarised response.

== Plot ==
The Doctor and Donna are taken by UNIT to its headquarters, as the world's population has become inexplicably violent. The Doctor is reunited with Shirley, head of UNIT Kate Lethbridge-Stewart, and former companion Melanie Bush. The Doctor determines the cause of the violence is a giggle from a Stooky Bill film from 1925, which John Logie Baird had recorded to demonstrate his invention of television.

The Doctor and Donna travel to 1925 and discover that the Toymaker sold Stooky Bill to Baird's assistant. The Toymaker traps the two in his domain and reveals that he transmitted the signal to make humanity play a never-ending game of debate, by making them aggressively convinced of the absolute correctness of all their beliefs. The Doctor and the Toymaker play a game of cards, with the latter winning. However, the Doctor states that since he won the game at their last meeting, (Note: As depicted in The Celestial Toymaker (1966)) they are tied. The Toymaker resolves to have one final game with him in the present day.

The Toymaker attacks UNIT before taking control of a laser cannon. He reasons that since he faced separate incarnations of the Doctor for each game, he must face another, and uses the cannon to mortally injure the Doctor, triggering his regeneration. However the Doctor instead splits into two incarnations via "bi-generation". Both the Fourteenth and Fifteenth Doctors challenge the Toymaker to a game of catch. The Doctors win, and the Toymaker is banished from existence.

Aboard the TARDIS, the Fifteenth Doctor advises his predecessor that he needs to recover from the extensive traumas that his past incarnations have accumulated across their lives. Donna suggests to the Fourteenth Doctor that he is physically identical to the Tenth because he is emotionally exhausted and has subconsciously recognised this need. She invites him to consider retiring from his constant travels and staying with her and her family, but he is reluctant to leave the TARDIS behind. The Fifteenth Doctor, realising that the Toymaker's rules of play still apply – when one wins a contest, one gets a prize – manages to create a second identical TARDIS. The Fourteenth Doctor settles down with Donna and her family, while the Fifteenth Doctor travels the universe in his predecessor's place.

== Production ==
=== Development ===
Prior to the episode airing, several details about the sixtieth anniversary specials were leaked, including the bi-generation twist. Davies was unconcerned, believing that the general public would probably be unaware of the leaks.

Davies was inspired to include Stooky Bill within the episode after recently working on the biographical TV series Nolly. This caused Davies to look into puppets and puppeteers, with the idea of someone pulling the strings, which inspired Davies to use the Toymaker as the antagonist. Davies also wished to bring back the Toymaker due to the antagonist last appearing in the 1960s, with "The Giggle" itself being the show's sixtieth anniversary, stating that "all the sixties came together, and there he was." The Toymaker utilises various different accents throughout the episode, which Davies explained was due to the fact that the Toymaker used stereotypical Chinese elements in the character's original appearance. Davies stated that he did not wish to "whitewash" the Toymaker, and thus expanded on the concept by having the Toymaker "playing with race" as a weapon in order to make the Toymaker a fundamentally evil character, without ignoring racist caricatures present in the Toymaker's original serial.

=== Filming ===
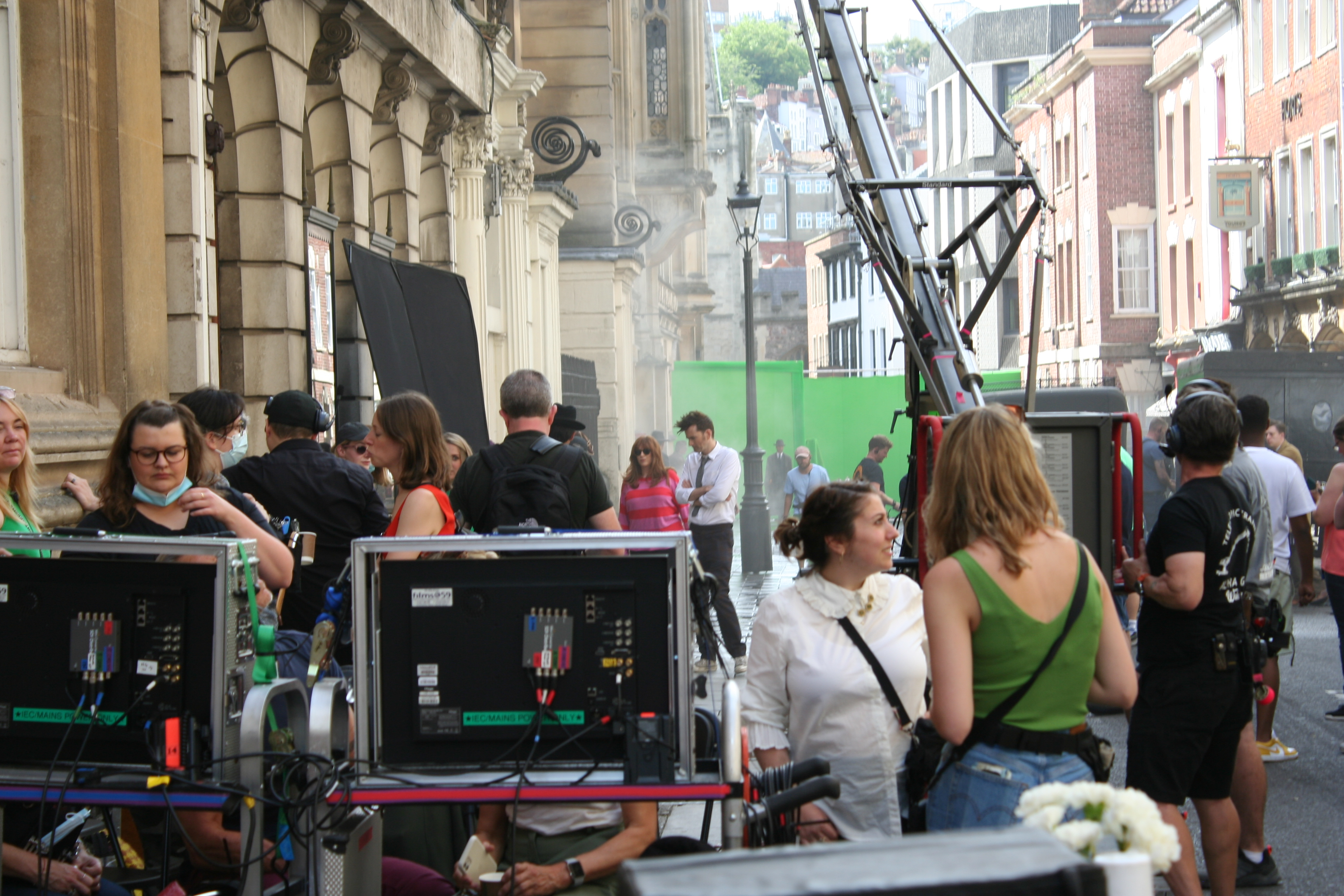
Cast and crew on location for "The Giggle."

Chanya Button directed the episode. Filming for the specials commenced in May 2022, and wrapped at the end of July 2022. The initial scenes, in which the city erupts into chaos and the Doctor dances with the Toymaker, were filmed in Old City, Bristol, with Bristol's film office assisting in production of the scenes. To celebrate the occasion, Bristol's film office produced a map depicting every filming location in Bristol used throughout Doctor Who's run by that point.

The UNIT Headquarters set utilised a ramp, which was constructed to be wheelchair accessible. The TARDIS similarly gained a wheelchair accessibility ramp in the episode, which was the result of Davies receiving a letter from a fan who stated they wouldn't have been able to enter the TARDIS due to their wheelchair.

One scene in the episode depicts the Doctor encountering life-sized marionettes resembling himself and Baird's assistant. Puppeteer Brian Fisher puppeteered the marionette alongside multiple other people, with the marionette requiring three to four people in order to properly puppeteer. The actors would film their parts, and the production team would overlay the actors on top of the puppet, which was filmed separately. Harris had experience puppeteering, and puppeteered the puppets himself in a scene in which the Toymaker taunts the Doctor. He talked to the team handling the puppets and worked out how best to handle the puppets for the scene, which was filmed in only half a day. After this, the team went and filmed the close-ups for the puppets, mimicking how Harris filmed them previously. The puppets resemble three of the Doctor's past companions: Amy Pond, Clara Oswald and Bill Potts, all of whom he met after leaving Donna behind in "Journey's End" (2008), with all three having died in the universe's canonicity.

The Toymaker uses several costumes in the episode, which were constructed by costume designer Pam Downes and members of the costumes team. In one scene, the Toymaker attacks UNIT Headquarters while dancing to the song "Spice Up Your Life" (1997) by the Spice Girls. In this scene, Harris wears a band leader outfit. Downes wished to use boots with red laces to highlight the red of the costume, and thus used women's riding boots to accomplish the outfit. For the musical number scene, Harris did choreography training alongside the other actors, including Jemma Redgrave. Harris additionally had to wear specially moulded teeth for the episode in order to depict the Toymaker as having more teeth than he should.

The bi-generation scene was filmed with a special craned camera, which allowed for the team to overlay Tennant and Gatwa's parts of the bi-generation onto each other. To simulate a split, Tennant and Gatwa split Tennant's costume in half between themselves. Due to Tennant filming first, he got to select which parts of the outfit he wore, while Gatwa was left with the remaining parts. The initial visual effect for the split was considered too violent by Davies and producer Phil Collinson, and it was toned down for the final episode. The Toymaker's catch scene was filmed with many individual single shots, with each one focusing on one of Tennant, Gatwa, and Harris. Various different cameras were used to film the scene, including drones. The three actors would hide the ball behind the palm of their hand and mimic catching the ball, in part due to difficulties catching the balls by the actors.

=== Casting ===
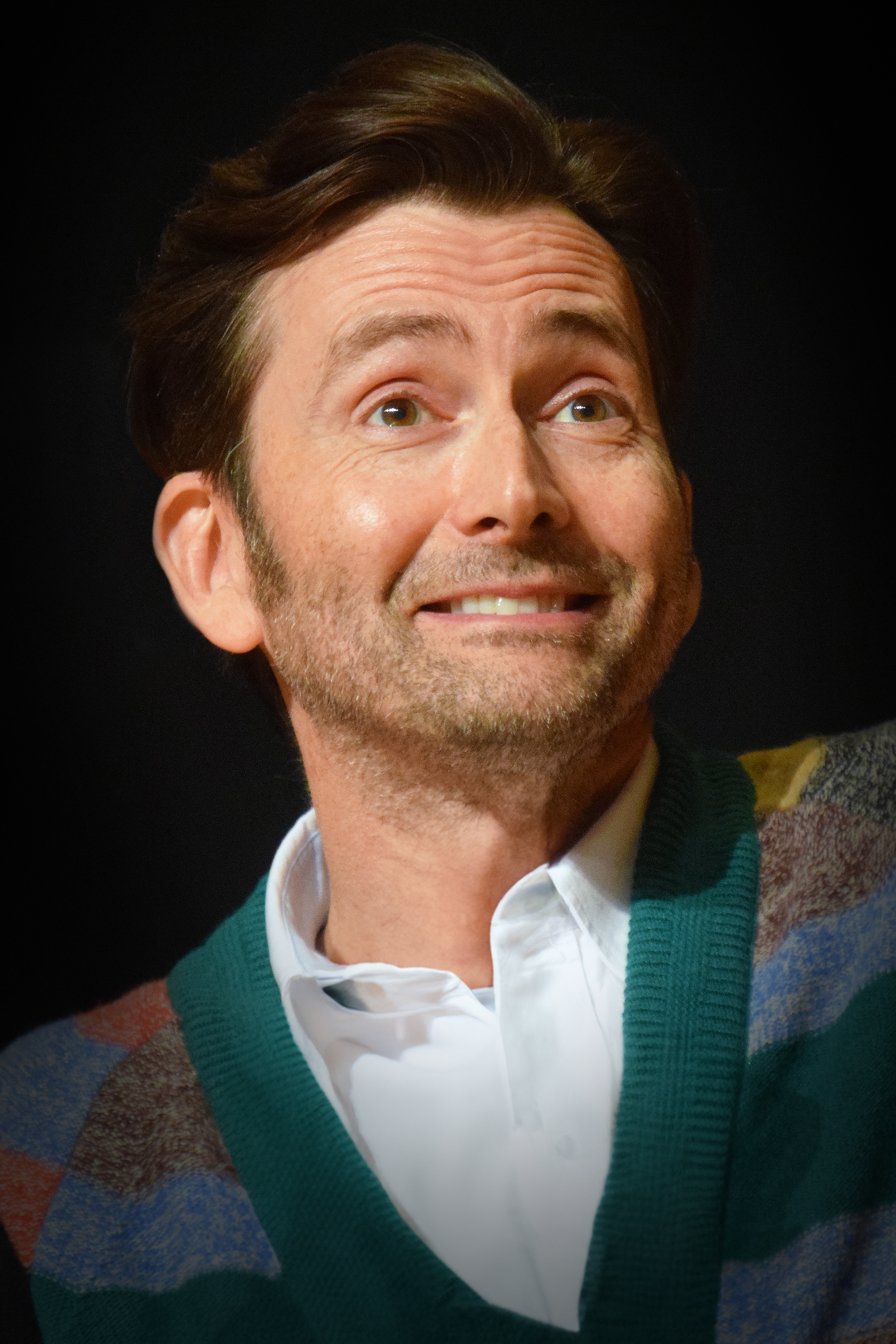
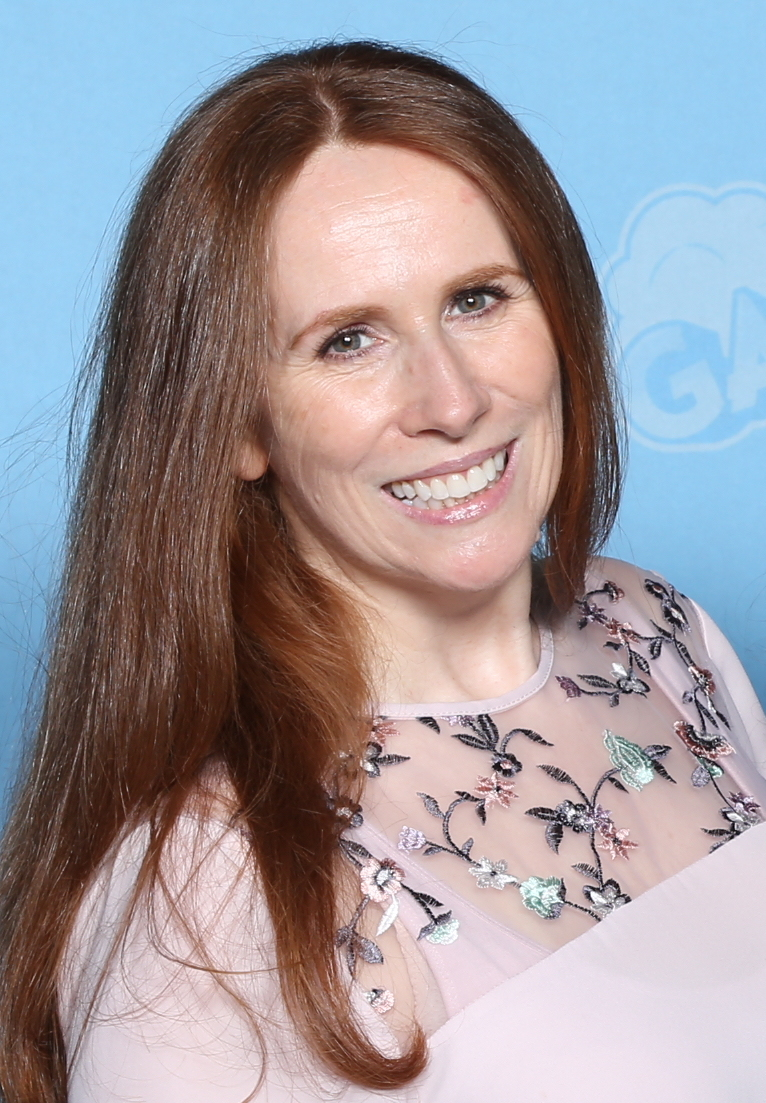
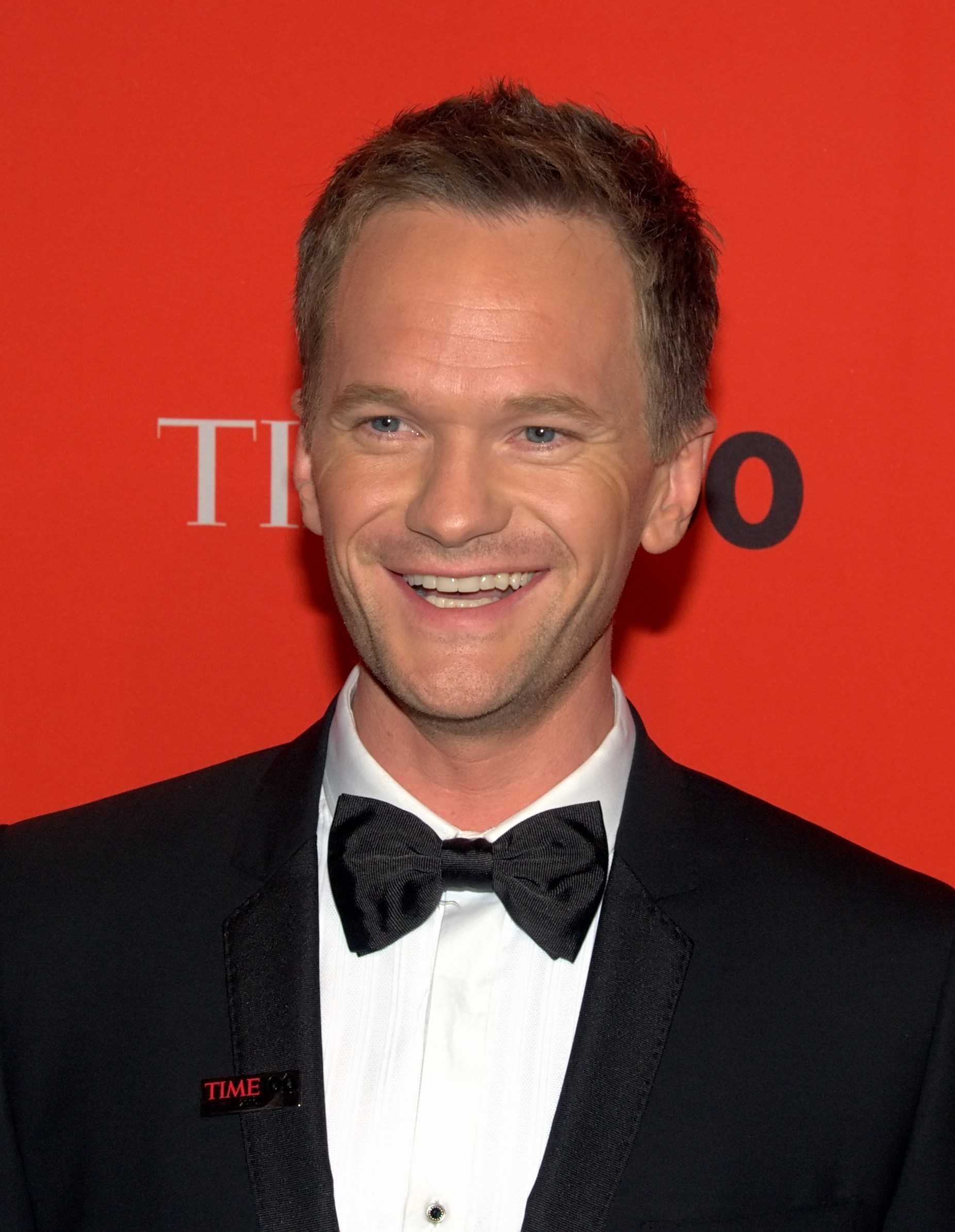
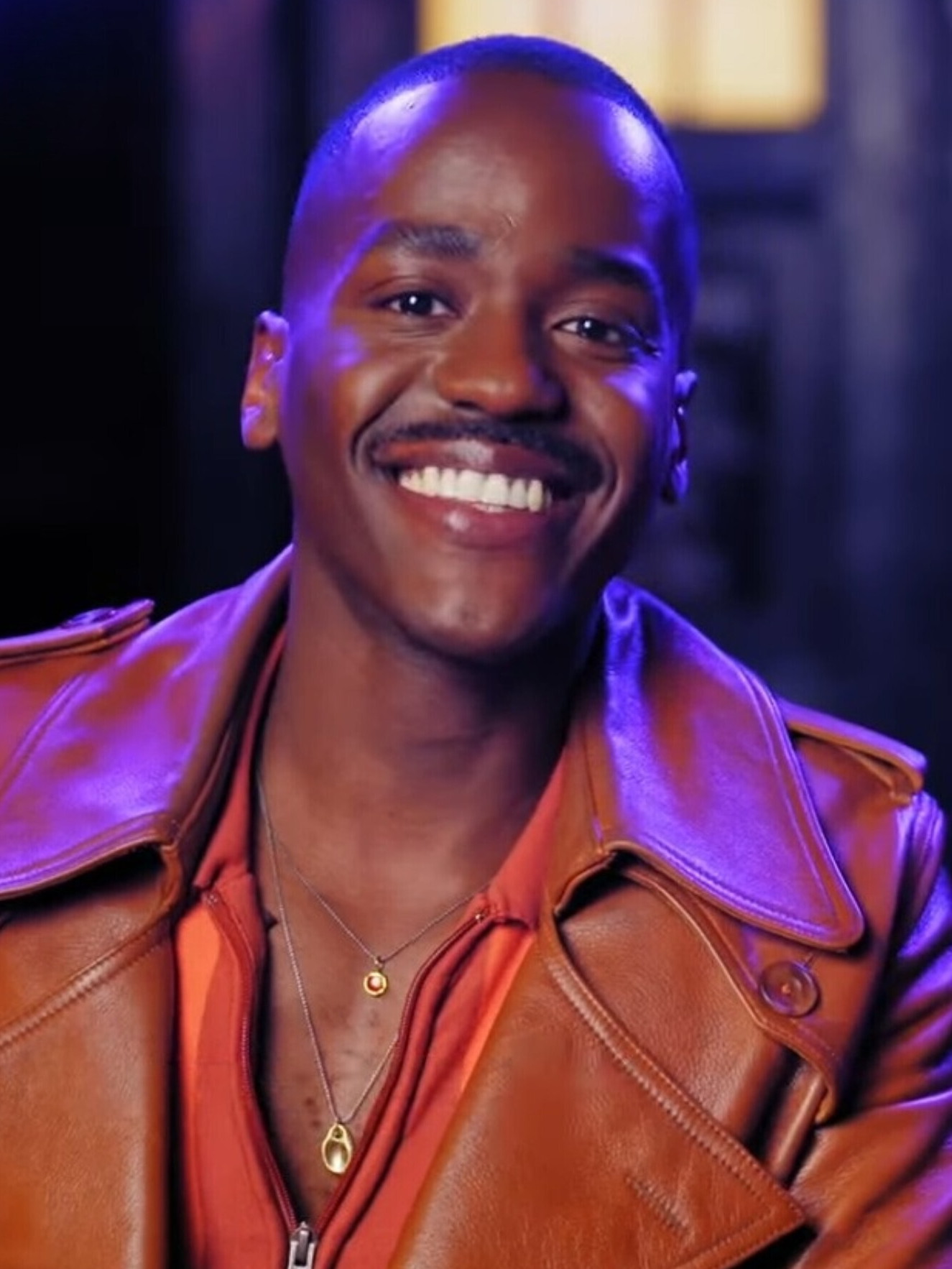
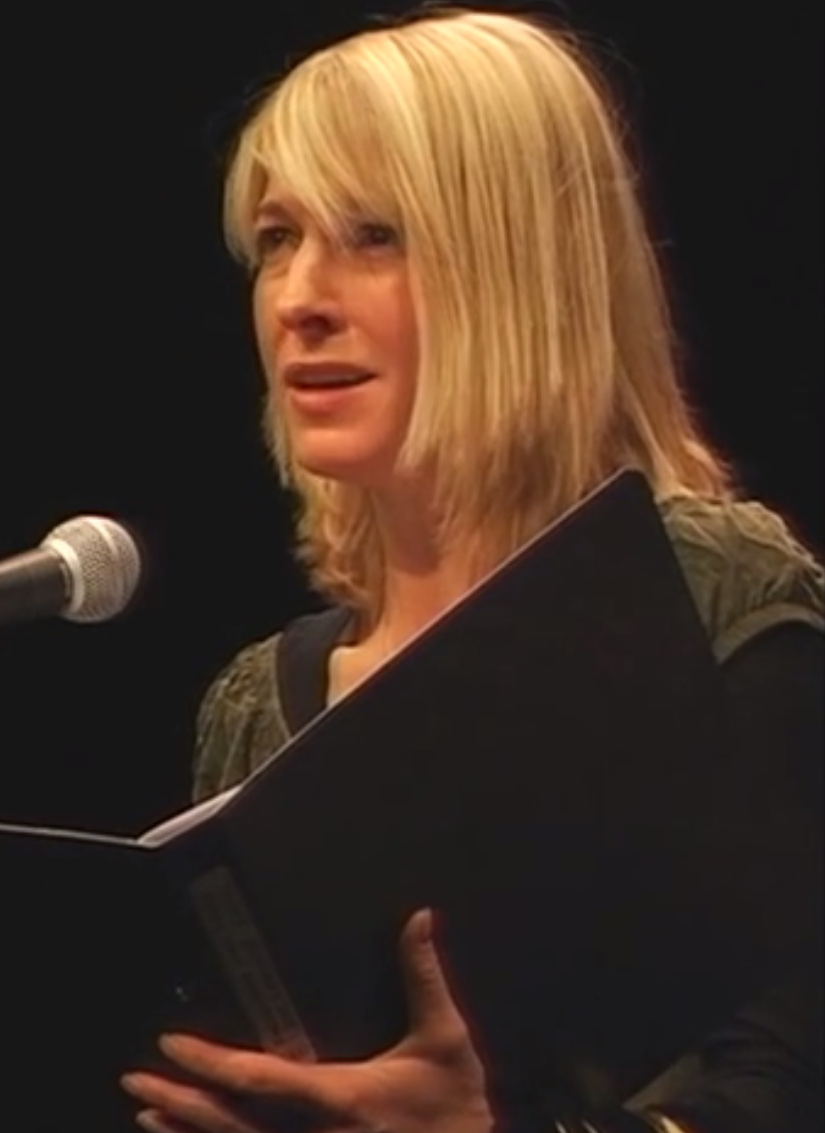
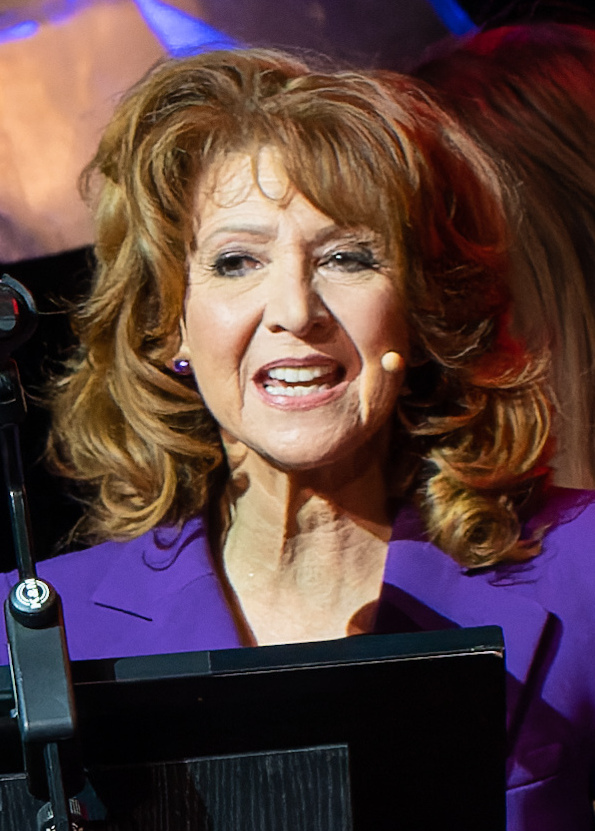
Actors David Tennant, Catherine Tate, Neil Patrick Harris, Ncuti Gatwa, Jemma Redgrave, and Bonnie Langford portrayed main cast roles in the episode.

David Tennant and Catherine Tate returned to the series as part of the 60th anniversary specials, making their final regular appearances as the Fourteenth Doctor and Donna Noble respectively in this episode. Ncuti Gatwa made his first appearance as the Fifteenth Doctor. Though Bernard Cribbins had wished to film more scenes in his role of Wilfred Mott, Donna's grandfather, his health was not well enough to do more than his scene in the prior episode, "Wild Blue Yonder" (2023). An uncredited double stood in as Wilfred for "The Giggle", which featured usage of an archival audio recording of Cribbins from "The Poison Sky" (2008). Neil Patrick Harris appears as the Toymaker, last seen in The Celestial Toymaker (1966), then portrayed by Michael Gough. Harris was asked directly by Davies to play the part via an Instagram direct message, and Harris had never heard of the show prior to taking on the part. Harris described the role of the Toymaker as "an incredibly exciting and exhausting role." Colourised footage depicting William Hartnell and Michael Gough as the First Doctor and the Toymaker from the original serial is used in a flashback when the Doctor encounters the Toymaker.

The episode features the return of Jemma Redgrave's Kate Lethbridge-Stewart, last seen in "The Power of the Doctor" (2022), and Bonnie Langford's Mel Bush, who made her last major appearance in Dragonfire (1987). Langford briefly reprised her role prior to the episode in a cameo in "The Power of the Doctor" and was directly asked to come back to the series by Davies. Lachele Carl briefly reprised her role as Trinity Wells, an American news anchor who appeared frequently during Davies's first era. John MacKay played the role of John Logie Baird in the episode, a role he had previously portrayed in Davies's series Nolly. Other actors include Charlie De Melo as Charles Bannerjee, Baird's assistant, and Alexander Devrient, who portrayed UNIT Colonel Ibrahim.

Davies originally planned on including Cribbins in the episode as Wilfred. One of these scenes near the end of the episode would have involved Wilfred shooting moles in Donna's backyard. Due to the poor health of Cribbins during filming, Davies made changes to the script. He initially wrote a scene where the Doctor would discuss Wilf's death in-universe. Davies was eventually convinced by producer Phil Collinson to keep Wilf alive in-universe in order to keep Cribbins's memory alive.

== Broadcast and reception ==
Professional ratings
Aggregate scores
Source	Rating
Rotten Tomatoes (Tomatometer)	100%
Review scores
Source	Rating
Empire	4/5 stars
The Independent	4/5 stars
The Guardian	4/5 stars
The Daily Telegraph	4/5 stars
i	5/5 stars

=== Broadcast ===
"The Giggle" was broadcast on 9 December 2023 as the third and final of the three 2023 specials, released for the 60th anniversary of Doctor Who. The episode aired on BBC One, and was later released on BBC iPlayer. The episode was released internationally on Disney+.

=== Ratings ===
"The Giggle" was watched by 4.62 million viewers overnight. It was the third most watched programme of the day. The consolidated ratings figures for the episode were 6.85 million viewers, making it the third most watched programme of the night behind episodes of I'm a Celebrity...Get Me Out of Here! and Strictly Come Dancing.

The episode was the lowest viewed of the three specials, with slightly less than both "The Star Beast" and "Wild Blue Yonder".

=== Critical reception ===
The special received positive reviews, with praise for Harris's performance and the writing. On Rotten Tomatoes, a review aggregator website, 100% of 7 critics gave "The Giggle" a positive review. The site's consensus reads "Capping off David Tennant's encore run, 'The Giggle' puts a twist on Doctor Who's regenerative conceit and gives fans the best of both worlds."

In a review for Den of Geek, Chris Allcock praised the returning characters, though he felt disappointed that Mel did not have more to do comparing her to Ace and Tegan in "The Power of the Doctor", and believed the introduction of Kate in the episode was out of place. He enjoyed the episode, though found the Toymaker's plot to not align well with the character's motivations. Samantha Coley of Collider praised the episode, highlighting its performances, plot, and the menace of the Toymaker as an antagonist. She additionally praised the ending and Gatwa's introduction. Will Salmon of Total Film praised the episode, highlighting the cast performances and overall production, but criticised the lack of attention on the titular Giggle, as well as the introduction of The Vlinx, which he felt "strikes an oddly goofy note in the episode." Jordan King of Empire praised the episode, highlighting the episode's ideas and execution, but criticised the episode for being "a tad unwieldy" at times with the amount of ideas utilised at once. Louise Griffin of The Radio Times highlighted the episode's writing, visuals, and musical score, believing that it allowed the show to harken back to Davies's first run while feeling "fresh and bigger" in the process.

The "bi-generation" plot twist was met with a polarising reaction from fans of the series, with some praising it as an interesting concept, while others felt it would undermine Gatwa's role as the Fifteenth Doctor in the upcoming fourteenth series. Writing for Vox, Constance Grady felt that the twist was unnecessary and went against the point of regeneration. In an article for Den of Geek, Andrew Blair felt that the bi-generation offered a clean slate for Doctor Who to continue. In 2024, the scene was nominated for a BAFTA award for most memorable TV moment. It lost to Happy Valley.

== Home media ==
The Giggle
- Author: James Goss
- Series: Doctor Who book: Target novelisations
- Publisher: BBC Books
- Publication date: 14 December 2023 (eBook); 11 January 2024 (paperback and audiobook)
- Pages: 224
- ISBN: 9781785948473

"The Giggle", along with the other two specials "Wild Blue Yonder" and "The Star Beast", were released together on DVD and Blu-ray on 18 December 2023 as part of the "60th Anniversary Collection".

=== In print ===
A novelisation of the episode, written by James Goss, was released as an eBook 14 December 2023. The paperback edition was made available for pre-order in July 2023 and was released on 11 January 2024 as part of the Target Collection. It was released as an audiobook read by Dan Starkey on the same day. Starkey had previously appeared as various Sontarans, most notably Strax.
