= Sydney Moseley =

British journalist

Sydney Alexander Moseley (1888–1961) was a British journalist and early radio and television broadcasting pioneer with John Logie Baird.

== Biography ==
Born in London in 1888, he joined the staff of the Daily Express in 1910 and later became the Cairo correspondent of the New York Times and was the official correspondent to the Mediterranean Expeditionary Force during WW1, afterwards becoming a radio reporter in the UK and United States; he was a founder and life member of the Overseas Press Club of America. As a radio commentator to American audiences his build-up was, "The Man Who Looks Like Winston Churchill".

Sydney Moseley was the announcer on the occasion of the first experimental television broadcast made by the BBC 30 September 1929. In July 1930 he was joint producer with Lance Sieveking of the first televised play broadcast by the BBC: Luigi Pirandello's experimental The Man with the Flower in His Mouth.

Despite supporting news censorship during wartime, in August 1944 Moseley broke the news story on the America Mutual Broadcasting System radio network about the allies' Operation Mincemeat ruse.

As an author, The Bookseller's reviews for August 1921 stated,

"[T]hose who have read his previous books know well Mr. Moseley possesses exceptional powers of vivid description and forceful writing. He can make his readers see the various scenes and incidents almost as if with his own eyes, and the artistic skill with which he emphasises the salient features or contrasts effectively one scene with another is in evidence on every page."

== Works ==
- The Truth about the Dardanelles (1916)
- With Kitchener in Cairo (1917)
- An Amazing Séance and an Exposure (1919)
- The Fleet from Within: Being the Impressions of a R. N. V. R. Officer (1919)
- A Singular People: Being Glimpses Into the Private Affairs of some Strange Characters (1921)
- Haunts of the Gay East (1921)
- The Much Chosen Race! (1922)
- Love's Ordeal. An Unconventional Romance, and a Diary (1923)
- The Night Haunts of London (1923)
- Brightest Spots in Brighter London: A Comprehensive Guide to London Amusements, Shopping Centres and Features of Interest to the Visitor (1924)
- The Mysterious Medium (1924)
- The truth about Borstal (1926)
- Money-Making in Stocks and Shares (1927)
- The Truth about Broadmoor (1927)
- Short Story Writing and Free-Lance Journalism (1928)
- The Small Investor's Guide (1930)
- Conan Doyle's Ghost Challenge (1931)
- Television To-day and To-morrow (coauthor Harry John Barton Chapple) (1931)
- Zone Television and the Television Arc, in Scientific American Magazine Vol. 144 No. 6 (June 1931), p. 379
- Broadcasting in My Time (1935)
- The Truth about a Journalist (1935)
- Television: A Guide for the Amateur (coauthor Herbert McKay) (1936)
- A Simple Guide to Television (coauthor Harry Chapple) (1938)
- God Help America! An Exhortation and a Sequel to The Truth about a Journalist (1952)
- John Baird: The Romance and Tragedy of the Pioneer of Television (1952)
- The Private Diaries of Sydney Moseley (1960)
