= Helensburgh Cemetery =

Cemetery in Argyll, Scotland

- Interactive map of Helensburgh Cemetery

Details
- Location: Helensburgh, Argyll
- Country: Scotland
- Coordinates: 56.002°N 4.713°W
- Find a Grave: Helensburgh Cemetery

Helensburgh Cemetery is an operational burial ground, dating from the mid 19th century, on the Old Luss Road in Helensburgh, Argyll, Scotland. Together with its boundary walls, lodge, gatepiers and gates it is designated as a Category B listed building by Historic Scotland.

The graveyard contains several fine monuments, including one to Bonar Law, the former Prime Minister, whose ashes are buried at Westminster Abbey.

== Notable burials ==
- John Logie Baird (1888–1946), scientist and inventor of television, and his wife Celia whose remains were brought over from South Africa to be buried with John Logie Baird
- David White Finlay (1840–1923) physician
- Hugh Kerr (1808–1891) tobacco merchant in Kentucky, monument by William Leiper
- Alexander Nisbet Paterson (1856–1947) and his artist wife Maggie Hamilton, monument by William Leiper
- John Ure (1824–1901), Lord Provost of Glasgow
- Alexander Ure, 1st Baron Strathclyde (1853–1928) son of John Ure
- Monument to the British Prime Minister Bonar Law by A. N. Paterson (cenotaph)

== War graves ==
There are 40 Commonwealth service personnel buried here whose graves are registered and maintained by the Commonwealth War Graves Commission, 21 from the First World War and 19 from the Second World War.
