= John Logie Baird =

Scottish inventor (1888–1946)

John Logie Baird FRSE
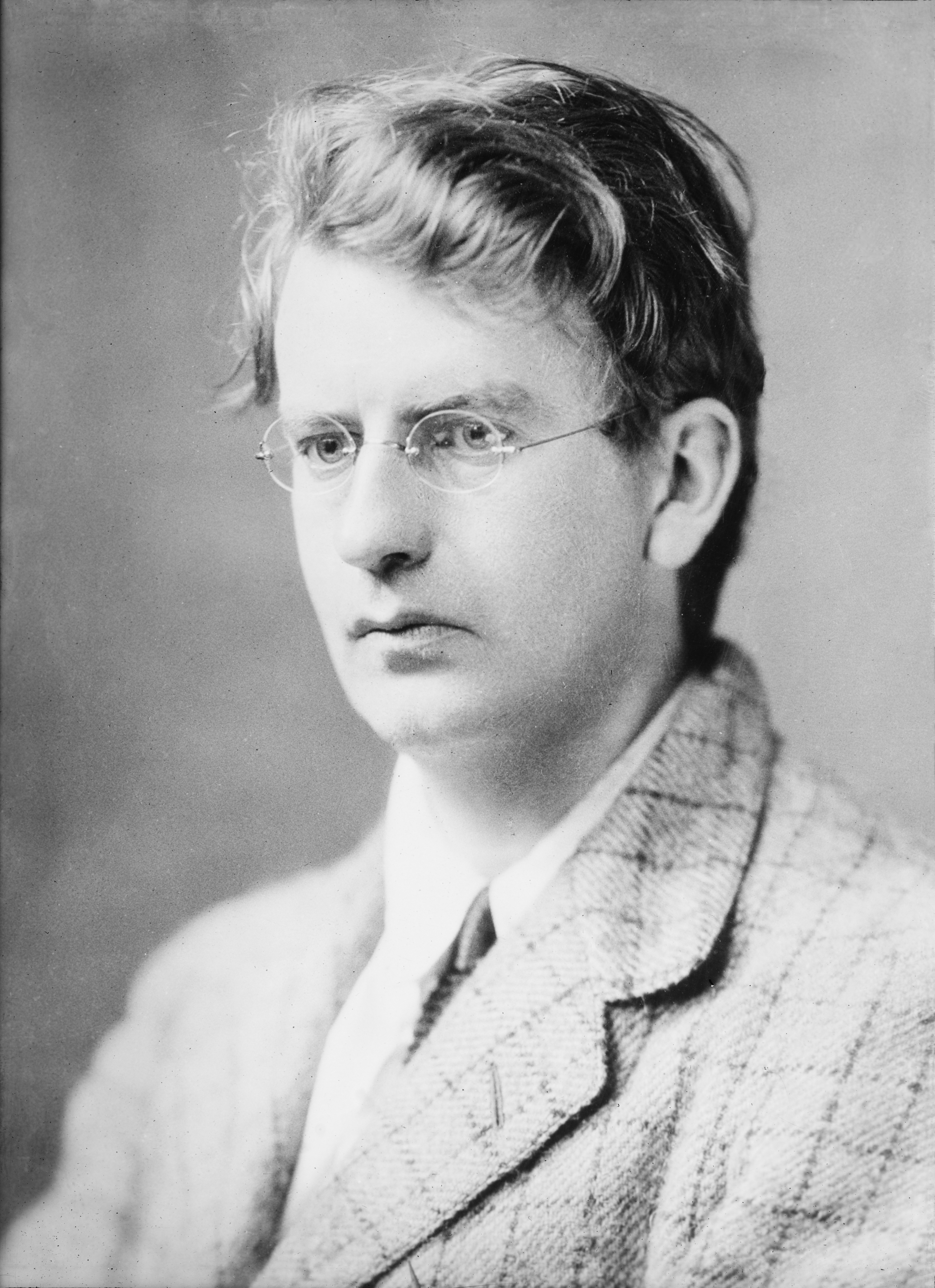
- Baird in 1917
- Born: 13 August 1888; Helensburgh, Dunbartonshire, Scotland
- Died: 14 June 1946 (aged 57); Bexhill, Sussex, England
- Resting place: Baird family grave in Helensburgh Cemetery
- Education: Larchfield Academy, Helensburgh; Royal Technical College (now University of Strathclyde); University of Glasgow
- Occupations: Inventor; Entrepreneur
- Organizations: Consulting technical adviser, Cable & Wireless Ltd (from 1941); Director, John Logie Baird Ltd; Director, Capital and Provincial Cinemas Ltd
- Known for: The world's first mechanical television system, including the first mechanical colour television
- Spouse: Margaret Albu (m. 1931)
- Children: 2
- Awards: Member of the Physical Society (1927); Member of the Television Society (1927); Honorary Fellow of the Royal Society of Edinburgh (1937)

John Logie Baird (/ˈloʊɡi bɛərd/; 13 August 1888 – 14 June 1946) was a Scottish inventor, electrical engineer and innovator who demonstrated the world's first mechanical television system on 26 January 1926. He went on to invent the first publicly demonstrated colour television system and the first viable purely electronic colour television picture tube.

In 1928, the Baird Television Development Company achieved the first transatlantic television transmission. Baird's early technological successes and his role in the practical introduction of broadcast television for home entertainment have earned him a prominent place in television's history.

In 2006, Baird was named as one of the 10 greatest Scottish scientists in history, having been listed in the National Library of Scotland's 'Scottish Science Hall of Fame'. In 2015, he was inducted into the Scottish Engineering Hall of Fame. In 2017, IEEE unveiled a bronze street plaque at 22 Frith Street (Bar Italia), London, dedicated to Baird and the invention of television. In 2021, the Royal Mint unveiled a John Logie Baird 50p coin commemorating the 75th anniversary of his death.

== Early years ==
Baird was born on 13 August 1888 in Helensburgh, Dunbartonshire, the youngest of four children of the Reverend John Baird, Church of Scotland minister for the local St Bride's Church, and Jessie Morrison Inglis, orphaned niece of the wealthy Inglis family of shipbuilders from Glasgow.

He was educated at Larchfield Academy (now part of Lomond School) in Helensburgh; the Glasgow and West of Scotland Technical College; and the University of Glasgow. While at college, Baird undertook a series of engineering apprentice jobs as part of his course. The conditions in industrial Glasgow at the time helped form his socialist convictions but also contributed to his ill health. He became an agnostic, though this did not strain his relationship with his father. His degree course was interrupted by the First World War and he never returned to graduate.

At the beginning of 1915 he volunteered for service in the British Army but was classified as unfit for active duty. Unable to go to the front, he took a job with the Clyde Valley Electrical Power Company, which was engaged in munitions work.

== Television experiments ==
In early 1923, and in poor health, Baird moved to 21 Linton Crescent, Hastings, on the warmer south coast of England. He later rented a workshop in the Queen's Arcade in the town. Baird built what was to become the world's first working television set using items that included an old hatbox and a pair of scissors, some darning needles, a few bicycle light lenses, a used tea chest, sealing wax and glue that he purchased. In February 1924, he demonstrated to the Radio Times that a semi-mechanical analogue television system was possible by transmitting moving silhouette images. In July of the same year he received a 1000-volt electric shock, surviving with only a burnt hand, and was asked by his landlord to vacate the premises.

Soon after arriving in London, looking for publicity, Baird visited the Daily Express newspaper offices to promote his invention. The news editor was terrified and was quoted by one of his staff as saying: "For God's sake, go down to reception and get rid of a lunatic who's down there. He says he's got a machine for seeing by wireless! Watch him—he may have a razor on him."

In these attempts to develop a working television system, Baird experimented using the Nipkow disk. Paul Gottlieb Nipkow had invented this scanning system in 1884. Television historian Albert Abramson calls Nipkow's patent "the master television patent." Nipkow's work is important because Baird, followed by many others, chose to develop it into a broadcast medium.

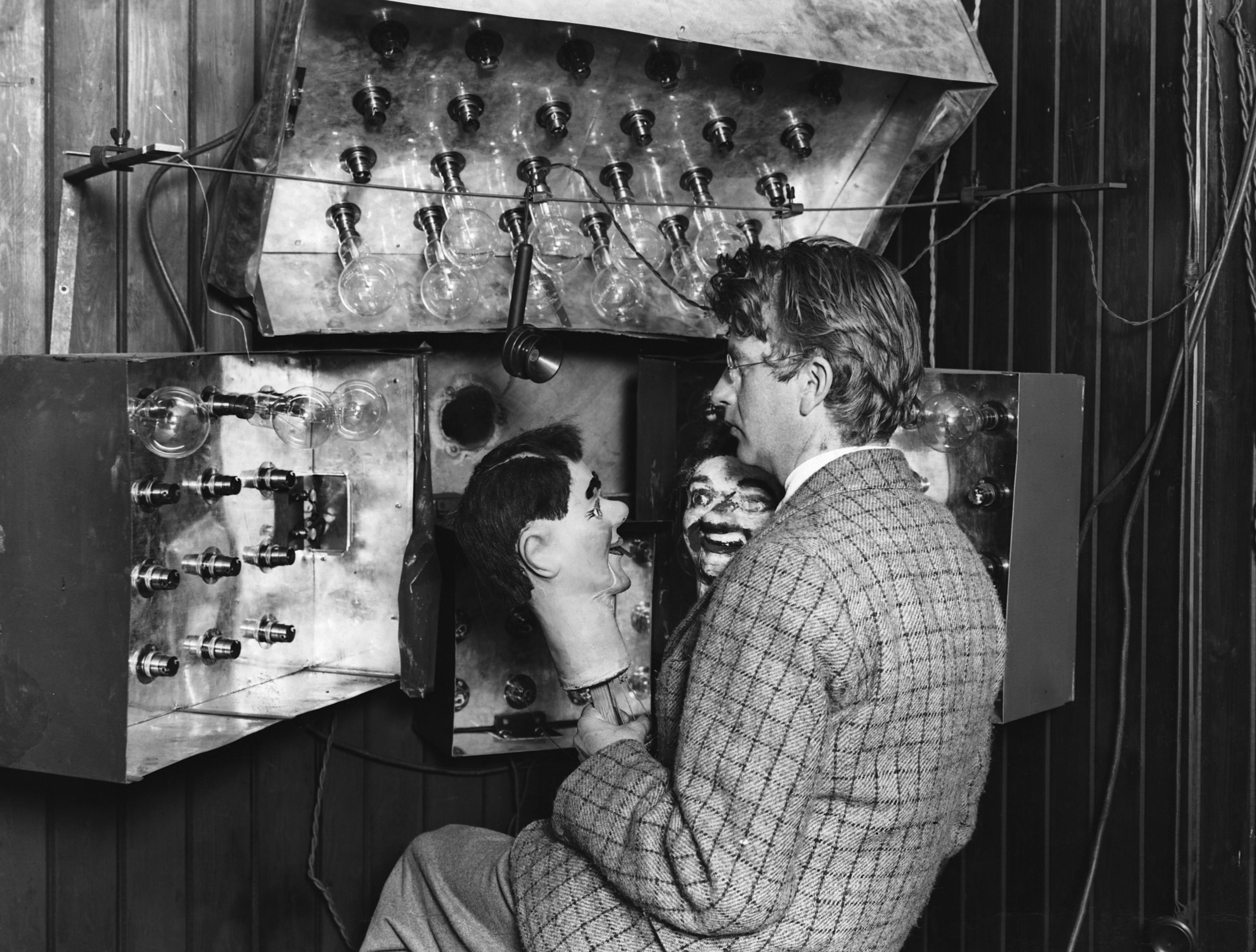
Baird in 1926 with his televisor equipment and dummies "James" and "Stooky Bill"

In his laboratory on 2 October 1925, Baird successfully transmitted the first television picture with a greyscale image: the head of a ventriloquist's dummy nicknamed "Stooky Bill" in a 32-line vertically scanned image, at five pictures per second. Baird went downstairs and fetched an office worker, 20-year-old William Edward Taynton, to see what a human face would look like, and Taynton became the first person to be televised in a full tonal range.

In June 1924, Baird purchased thallium sulfide (developed by Theodore Case in the US) from Cyril Frank Elwell. The chemical became an important part in the development of "talking pictures." Baird's implementation of the thallium sulfide resulted in the first live-animated image on lens from reflected light. He improved the signal conditioning from the thallium sulfide "cell" via temperature optimisation (cooling) and his own custom-designed video amplifier, pioneering the technology we now use today.

=== First public demonstrations ===
Baird gave the first public demonstration of moving silhouette images by television at Selfridges department store in London in a three-week period beginning on 25 March 1925.

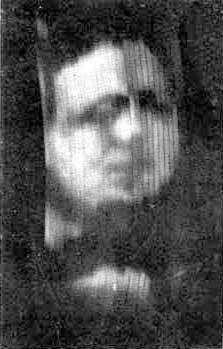
The first known photograph of a moving image produced by Baird's "televisor", as reported in The Times, 28 January 1926 (The subject is Baird's business partner Oliver Hutchinson.)

On 26 January 1926, Baird gave the first public demonstration of true television images for members of the Royal Institution and a reporter from The Times in his laboratory at 22 Frith Street in the Soho district of London, where Bar Italia is now located. Baird initially used a scan rate of 5 pictures per second, improving this to 12.5 pictures per second c. 1927. It was the first demonstration of a television system that could scan and display live moving images with tonal graduation.

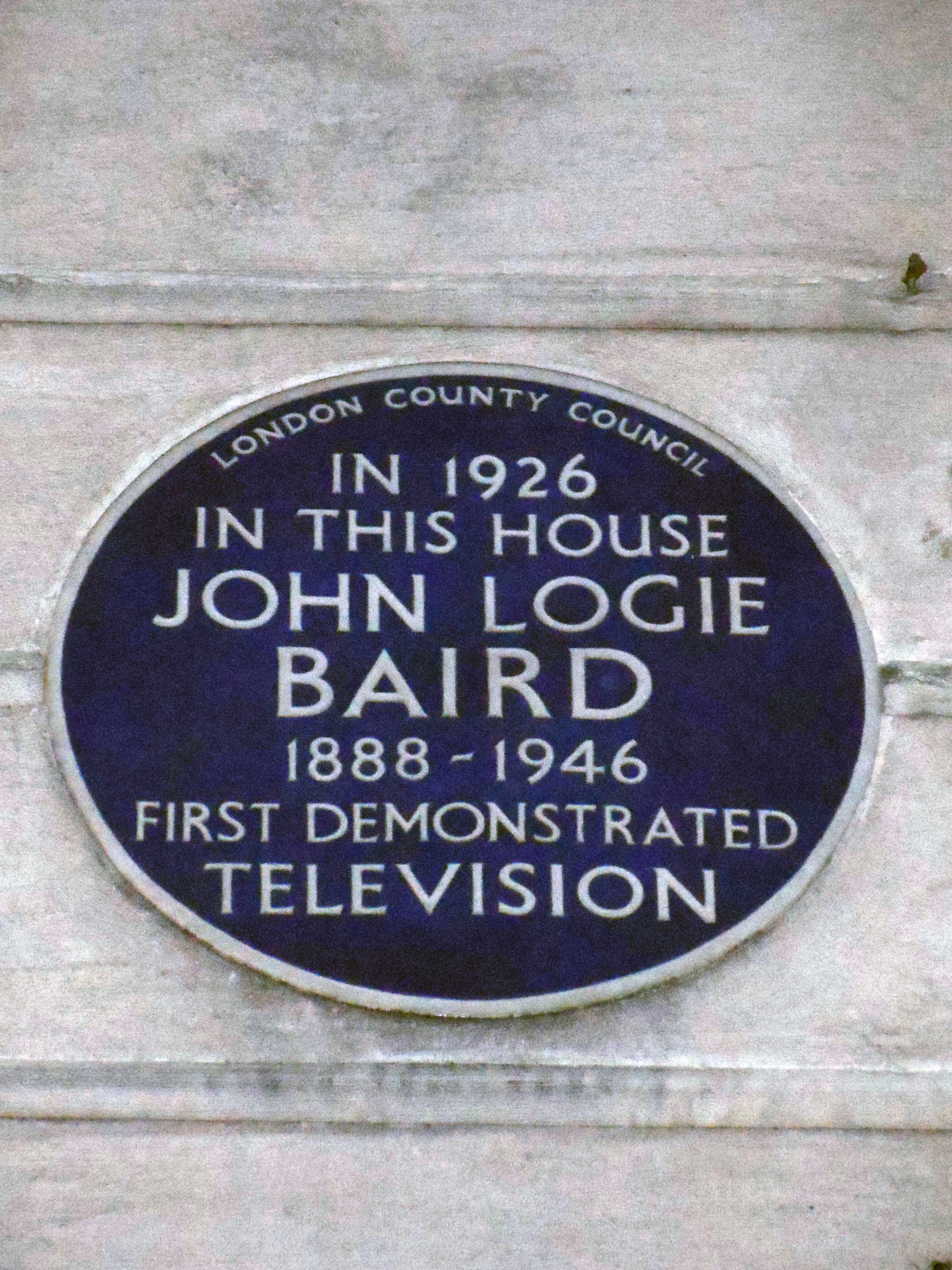
Blue plaque marking Baird's first demonstration of television at 22 Frith Street, Westminster, W1, London

He demonstrated the world's first colour transmission on 3 July 1928, using scanning discs at the transmitting and receiving ends with three spirals of apertures, each spiral with a filter of a different primary colour; and three light sources at the receiving end, with a commutator to alternate their illumination. In the same year he also demonstrated stereoscopic television.

=== Broadcasting ===
In 1927, Baird transmitted Britain's first long-distance television pictures over 438 miles (705 km) of telephone line between London and the Central Hotel at Glasgow Central station. This transmission was Baird's response to a 225-mile, long-distance telecast between stations of AT&T Bell Labs. The Bell stations were in New York and Washington, DC. The earlier telecast took place in April 1927, a month before Baird's demonstration.

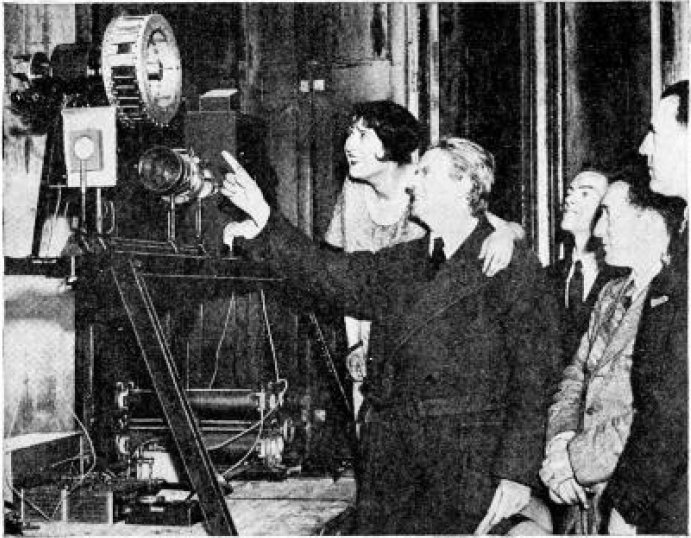
Baird demonstrating his mechanical television system in New York, 1931

Baird set up the Baird Television Development Company Ltd, which in 1928 made the first transatlantic television transmission, from London to Hartsdale, New York, and in 1929 the first television programmes officially transmitted by the BBC. In November 1929, Baird and Bernard Natan established France's first television company, Télévision-Baird-Natan. Broadcast on the BBC on 14 July 1930, The Man with the Flower in His Mouth was the first drama shown on UK television. The BBC transmitted Baird's first live outside broadcast with the televising of The Derby in 1931. He demonstrated a theatre television system, with a screen two feet by five feet (60 cm by 150 cm), in 1930 at the London Coliseum, Berlin, Paris, and Stockholm. By 1939 he had improved his theatre projection to televise a boxing match on a screen 15 ft (4.6 m) by 12 ft (3.7 m).

From 1929 to 1935, the BBC transmitters were used to broadcast television programmes using the 30-line Baird system, and from 1932 to 1935 the BBC also produced the programmes in their own studio, first at Broadcasting House and then later at 16 Portland Place. In addition, from 1933 Baird and the Baird Company were producing and broadcasting a small number of television programmes independent of the BBC from Baird's studios and transmitter at the Crystal Palace in south London.

On 2 November 1936, from Alexandra Palace located on the high ground of the north London ridge, the BBC began alternating Baird 240-line transmissions with EMI's electronic scanning system, which had recently been improved to 405 lines after a merger with Marconi. The Baird system at the time involved an intermediate film process, where footage was shot on cinefilm, which was rapidly developed and scanned.

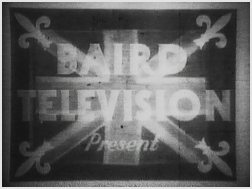
An early experimental television broadcast

The trial was due to last for 6 months but the BBC ceased broadcasts with the Baird system in February 1937, due in part to a disastrous fire in the Baird facilities at Crystal Palace. It was becoming apparent to the BBC that the Baird system would ultimately fail due in large part to the lack of mobility of the Baird system's cameras, with their developer tanks, hoses, and cables. Commercially Baird's contemporaries, such as George William Walton and William Stephenson, were ultimately more successful as their patents underpinned the early television system used by Scophony Limited who operated in Britain up to WWII and then in the US. "Of all the electro-mechanical television techniques invented and developed by the mid 1930s, the technology known as Scophony had no rival in terms of technical performance." In 1948 Scophony acquired John Logie Baird Ltd.

Baird's television systems were replaced by the first fully electronic television system developed by the newly formed company EMI-Marconi under Sir Isaac Shoenberg, who headed a research group that developed an advanced camera tube (the Emitron) and a relatively efficient hard-vacuum cathode-ray tube for the television receiver. Philo T. Farnsworth's electronic "Image Dissector" camera was available to Baird's company via a patent-sharing agreement. However, the Image Dissector camera was found to be lacking in light sensitivity, requiring excessive levels of illumination. The Baird company used the Farnsworth tubes instead to scan cinefilm, in which capacity they proved serviceable though prone to drop-outs and other problems. Farnsworth himself came to London to the Baird Crystal Palace laboratories in 1936 but was unable to fully solve the problem; the fire that burned Crystal Palace to the ground later that year further hampered the Baird company's ability to compete.

=== Fully electronic ===
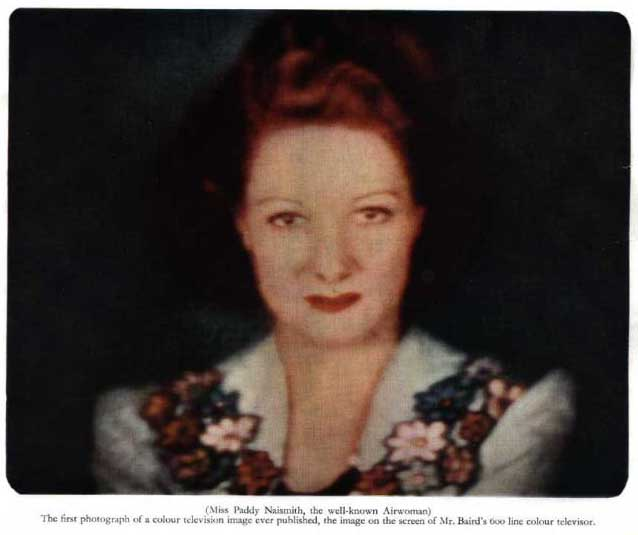
This live image of Paddy Naismith was used to demonstrate Baird's first all-electronic colour television system, which used two projection CRTs. The two-colour image was similar to the later Telechrome system.

Baird made many contributions to the field of electronic television after mechanical systems became obsolete. In 1939, he showed a system known today as hybrid colour using a cathode-ray tube in front of which revolved a disc fitted with colour filters, a method taken up by CBS and RCA in the United States.

As early as 1940, Baird had started work on a fully electronic system he called the "Telechrome". Early Telechrome devices used two electron guns aimed at either side of a phosphor plate. The phosphor was patterned so the electrons from the guns only fell on one side of the patterning or the other. Using cyan and magenta phosphors, a reasonable limited-colour image could be obtained.

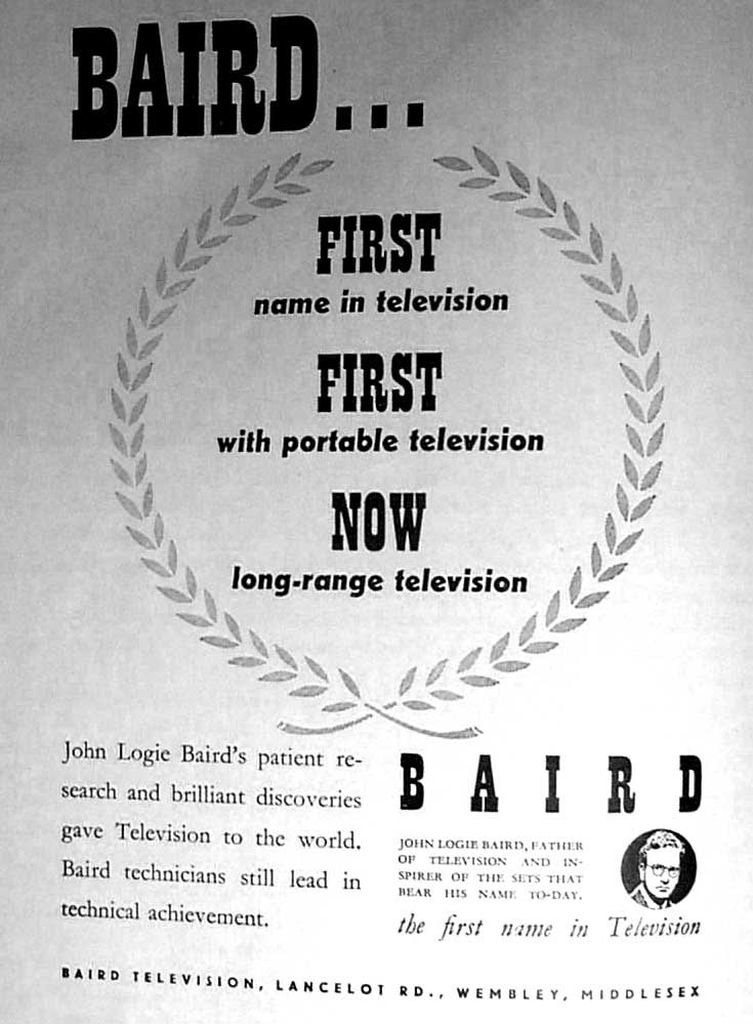
A Baird television advertisement, c. 1949

In 1941, he patented and demonstrated this system of three-dimensional television at a definition of 500 lines. On 16 August 1944, he gave the world's first demonstration of a practical fully electronic colour television display. His 600-line colour system used triple interlacing, using six scans to build each picture.

In 1943, the Hankey Committee was appointed to oversee the resumption of television broadcasts after the war. Baird persuaded them to make plans to adopt his proposed 1000-line Telechrome electronic colour system as the new post-war broadcast standard. The picture resolution on this system would have been comparable to today's HDTV (High Definition Television). The Hankey Committee's plan lost all momentum partly due to the challenges of postwar reconstruction. The monochrome 405-line standard remained in place until 1985 in some areas, and the 625-line system was introduced in 1964 and (PAL) colour in 1967. A demonstration of large screen three-dimensional television by the BBC was reported in March 2008, over 60 years after Baird's demonstration.

== Other inventions ==
Some of Baird's early inventions were not fully successful. In his twenties he tried to create diamonds by heating graphite. Later Baird invented a glass razor, which was rust-resistant, but shattered. Inspired by pneumatic tyres he attempted to make pneumatic shoes, but his prototype contained semi-inflated balloons, which burst (years later this same idea was successfully adopted for Dr. Martens boots). He also invented a thermal undersock (the Baird undersock), which was moderately successful. Baird suffered from cold feet, and after several trials, he found that an extra layer of cotton inside the sock provided warmth.

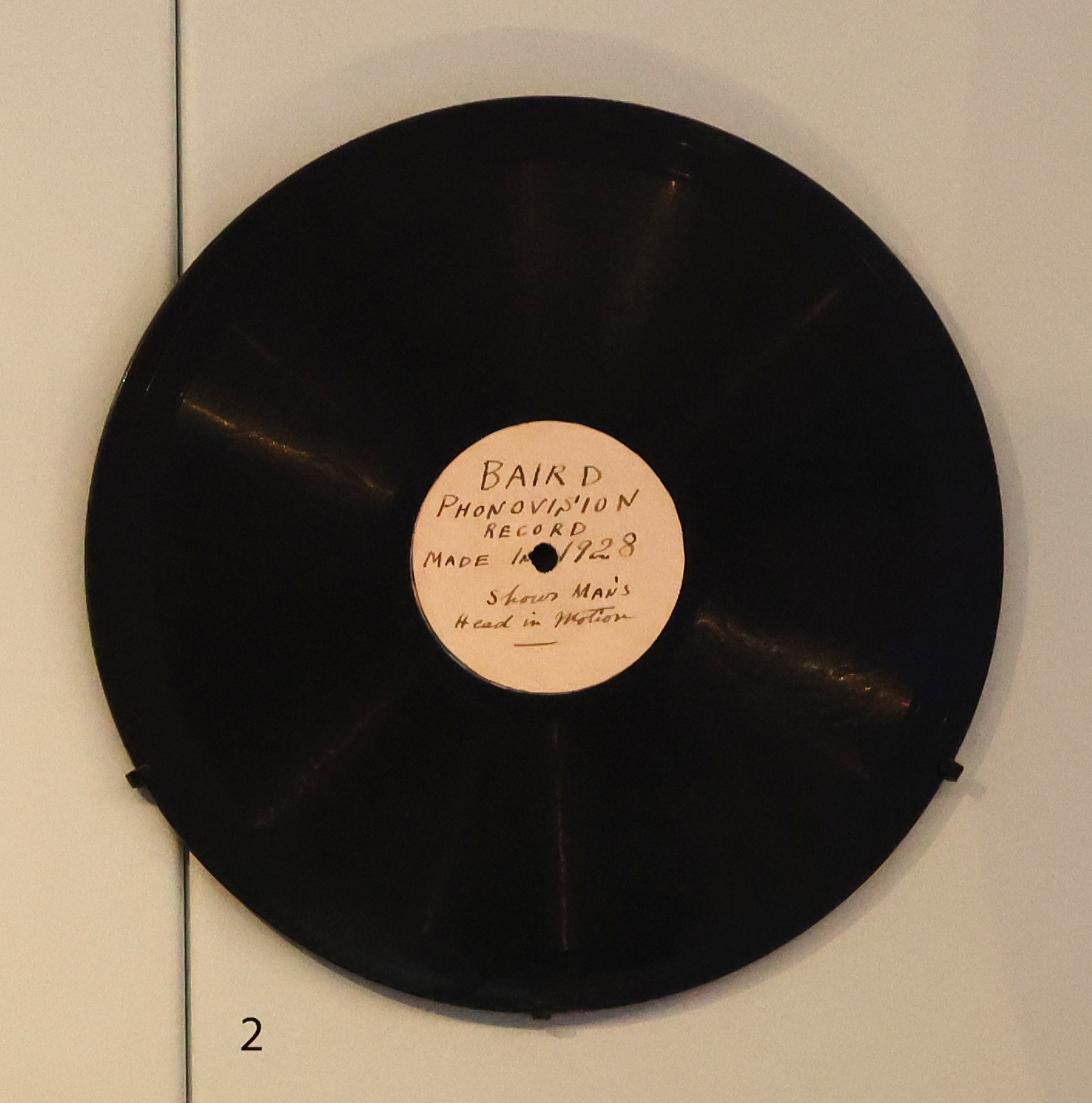
Phonovision record (1928)

Between 1926 and 1928, he attempted to develop an early video recording device, which he dubbed Phonovision. The system consisted of a large Nipkow scanning disk attached by a mechanical linkage to a record-cutting lathe. The result was a disc that could record a 30-line video signal. Technical difficulties with the system prevented its further development, but some of the original Phonovision discs have been preserved.

Baird's other developments were in fibre-optics, radio direction finding, infrared night viewing and radar. There is discussion about his exact contribution to the development of radar, for his wartime defence projects have never been officially acknowledged by the UK government. According to Malcolm Baird, his son, what is known is that in 1926 Baird filed a patent for a device that formed images from reflected radio waves, a device remarkably similar to radar, and that he was in correspondence with the British government at the time. The radar contribution is in dispute. According to some experts, Baird's "Noctovision" is not radar. Unlike radar (except continuous wave radar), Noctovision is incapable of determining the distance to the scanned subject. Noctovision also cannot determine the coordinates of the subject in three-dimensional space.

== Death ==
From December 1944, Logie Baird lived at 1 Station Road, Bexhill-on-Sea, East Sussex. He later died there on 14 June 1946 after suffering a stroke in February. The house was demolished in 2007 and the site is now occupied by apartments named Baird Court. Logie Baird is buried beside his parents in Helensburgh Cemetery, Argyll, Scotland.

== Honours and portrayals ==
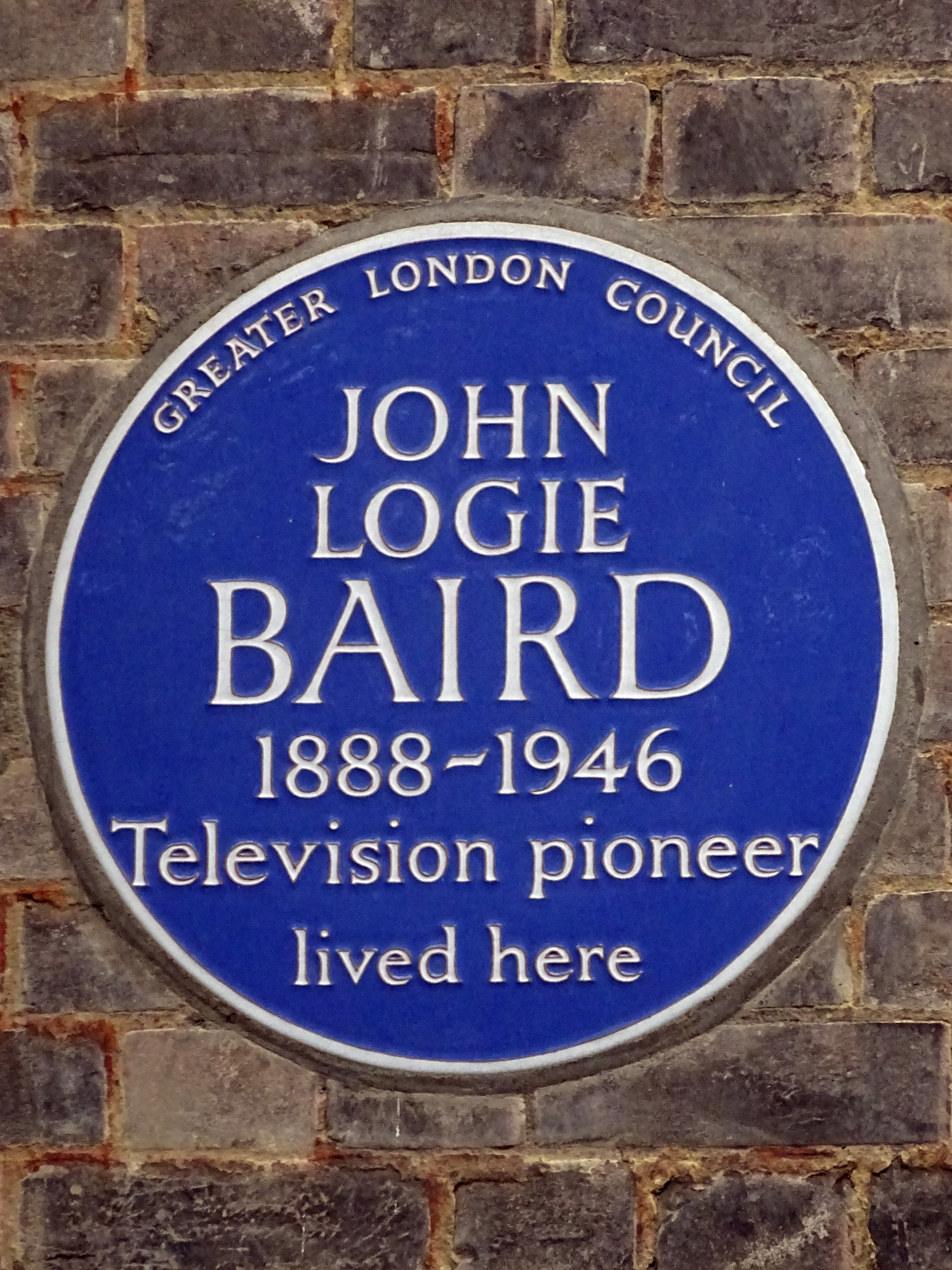
Blue plaque erected by Greater London Council at 3 Crescent Wood Road, Sydenham, London

Australian television's Logie Awards were named in honour of John Logie Baird's contribution to the invention of the television.

Baird became the only posthumous subject of This Is Your Life when he was honoured by Eamonn Andrews at the BBC Television Theatre in 1957.

In 2014, the Society of Motion Picture and Television Engineers (SMPTE) inducted Logie Baird into The Honor Roll, which "posthumously recognizes individuals who were not awarded Honorary Membership during their lifetimes but whose contributions would have been sufficient to warrant such an honor".

In 2023, John MacKay portrayed John Logie Baird in both the ITV series Nolly and the Doctor Who episode "The Giggle".

== Legacy ==
In 2013, Historic Environment Scotland awarded a plaque to commemorate Logie Baird. It can be found in Helensburgh.

== See also ==
- History of television
