= Stooky Bill =

Dummy used in testing of early television systems

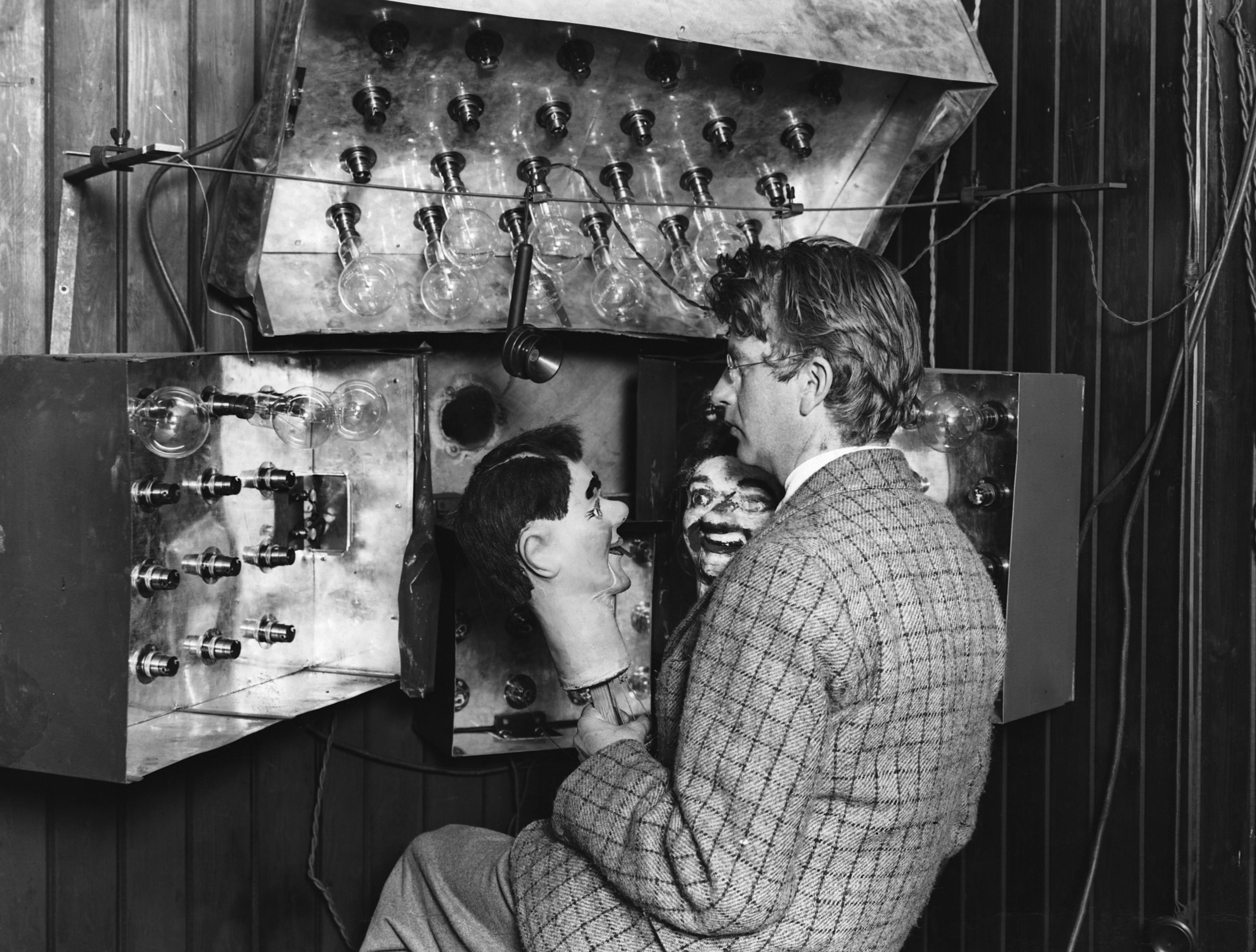
Baird in 1925 with his televisor scanner and dummies "James" and "Stooky Bill" (right). The banks of bright lights were needed to produce a bright enough image at the receiver.

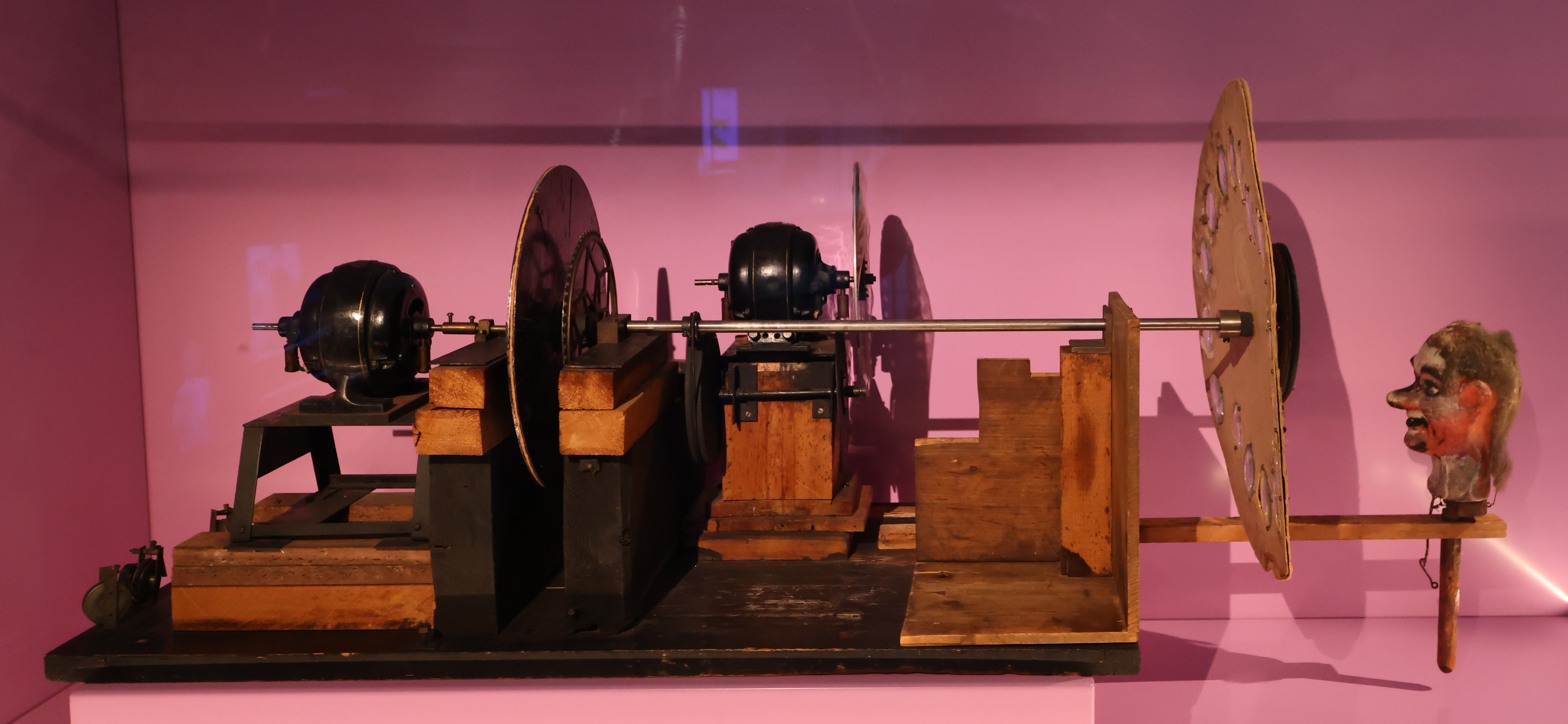
Logie Baird's original experimental television apparatus with Stooky Bill on right

Stooky Bill was the name given to the head of a ventriloquist's dummy that Scottish television pioneer John Logie Baird used in his 1924 experiments to transmit a televised image between rooms in his laboratory at 22 Frith Street, London.

== History ==
John Logie Baird invented some of the first experimental television systems. In 1924 he developed a mechanical television system to transmit moving images by means of electrical signals, which he demonstrated on 25 March 1925 at a London department store, Selfridges. It consisted of a spinning disk set with a spiral pattern of 30 lenses. As each lens rotated past the illuminated subject, it focused the light from a spot on the subject on a selenium photoelectric cell. This converted the brightness of the image at each spot into a proportional electric signal, which could be sent to a receiver by radio waves. As each lens swept past the subject, it scanned a successive line of the image. At the receiver, a light shining through the holes in a similar rotating disk recreated an image of the subject.

Due to the low sensitivity of the photoelectric cells, Baird's first system was not able to televise human faces, because they had inadequate contrast. Baird therefore used a ventriloquist's dummy, the brightly painted face of which had greater contrast, and made it move and talk before the scanner. The incandescent lights illuminating the subject to be televised also generated so much heat that Baird could not use a human for the testing. Eventually the hair became singed and the painted face became cracked by the heat. Stooky Bill and another Baird dummy, "James", have been jokingly called "the first television actors".

Stooky Bill is now on display at the Science and Media Museum in Bradford, England.

== Name ==
"Stooky" or "stookie" is Scots for stucco or plaster of Paris, or for a plaster cast used to immobilise bone fractures. The term is also used for someone who is slow-witted or awkward in their movements.

== In popular culture ==
Stooky Bill was a major plot point in the Doctor Who 60th anniversary special "The Giggle", in which he was used by the villainous Toymaker to spread insanity through every screen on Earth by making everyone's opinion and beliefs unshakable, thus starting a never-ending game of debates.

== See also ==
- Mechanical television
- History of television
- Phonovision
