= Radio Times's Most Powerful People =

British annual listing for comedy, drama and radio (2003–2005)

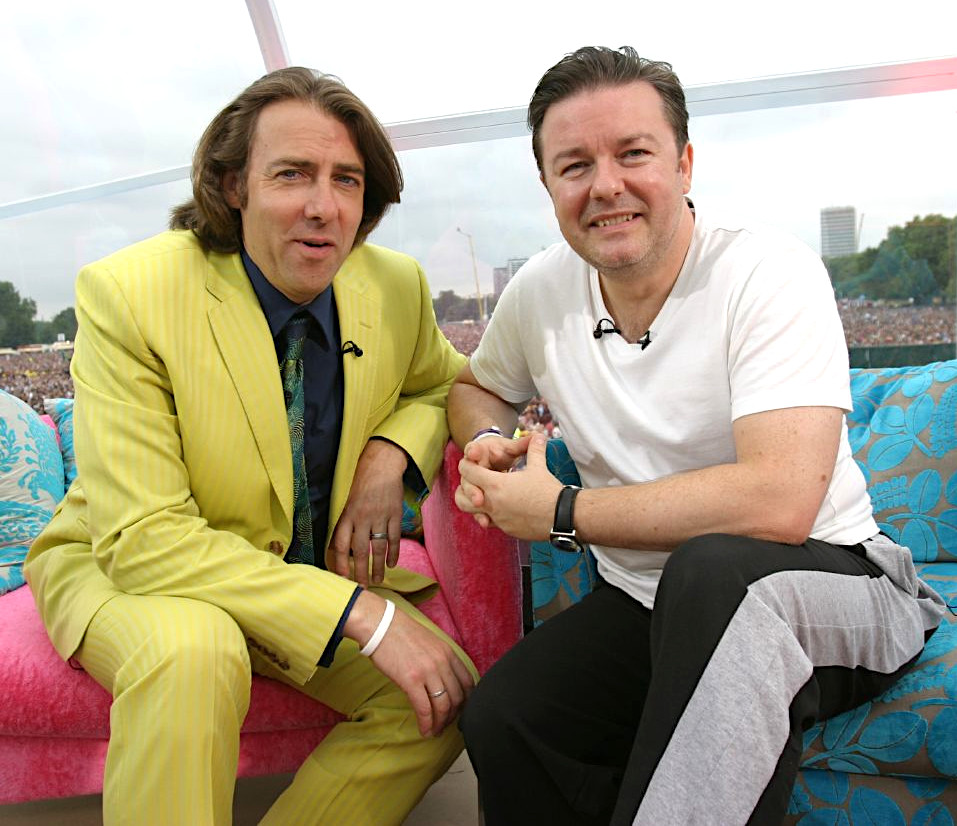
Jonathan Ross (left) was named by Radio Times as the most powerful person in radio in June 2005. Ricky Gervais (right) was named the most powerful person in TV comedy in January 2003.

Radio Times's Most Powerful People was a series of listings created by the British weekly magazine Radio Times from January 2003 to June 2005. The lists charted who the magazine believed were the most powerful people from three different areas of British media: TV comedy, TV drama and radio. The listing for TV comedy was published three times, every January from 2003 to 2005; the drama and radio lists were produced just once each, in July 2004 and June 2005 respectively.

The first 'Most Powerful People' listing was published by Radio Times in January 2003, and recognised the most influential people in TV comedy in the United Kingdom. It was topped by the British comedian Ricky Gervais, as a result of the success of the award-winning second series of his TV show The Office. The second poll, published a year later in January 2004, was won by the Irish comedian Graham Norton, following his signing of two new contracts during 2003, each worth a reported £5 million. Six months later, in July 2004, Radio Times published their 'Most Powerful People in TV Drama' list. Following a series of votes from industry experts, the magazine named the actress Julie Walters as their choice for the most powerful person in drama.

In January 2005, Radio Times published the third 'Most Powerful People in TV Comedy' list, which was topped by the comedy duo Matt Lucas and David Walliams for their sketch show Little Britain, which the magazine called "inspired". That June, Radio Times published their final 'Most Powerful People' list, which named the most influential people in radio in the United Kingdom. Restricted only to current broadcasters, the poll was won by the DJ and TV host Jonathan Ross, who was praised as "one of the wittiest people on radio".

== TV comedy ==
The first 'Most Powerful People' listing created by Radio Times was for TV comedy. It listed the 50 most influential individuals in British television comedy, and was based on critical reception, viewing figures, financial success and previous successes in comedy, as well as opinions from industry experts, from the previous 12 months. The list was first published in January 2003, and was topped by Ricky Gervais. The comedian was named the most powerful person in TV comedy following the success of the second series of his TV show The Office, which had won two British Academy Television Awards in April. Gervais himself had received the Best Comedy Actor award at the 2002 British Comedy Awards in December. Radio Times described Gervais's work as "legendary" and "peerless", and stated: "Ricky Gervais owned TV comedy in 2002".

Irish comedian Graham Norton was placed at number three on the 2003 list; the following year, he climbed to number one to top the 2004 listing. Norton was placed at number one as a result of signing two new contracts during 2003, each worth a reported £5 million. One was with BBC One – who brought Norton in to be the face of their Saturday night programming – while the other was with the American channel Comedy Central, who commissioned him to produce The Graham Norton Effect, a new comedy chat show based in the United States. Speaking about Norton's placing, a spokesman for Radio Times remarked: "Even a toned-down Graham Norton is certain to be more risqué than anything late-night American TV has ever seen before." They also credited 2003 as being a "good year for comedy", highlighting shows such as QI, Early Doors and Little Britain in particular.

The highest new entry in the 2004 chart was the comedy duo Matt Lucas and David Walliams, who were placed at number 10 for their "genuinely quirky" sketch show Little Britain. Lucas and Walliams climbed to number one in the 2005 chart, while Norton dropped to number 16. Julia Davis, writer and star of the sitcom Nighty Night, was the highest new entry and the highest-placed woman. Radio Times noted that, over the previous year, they had seen "the rise of some less cuddly creations – Little Britain took its inspired sketch show into edgier areas, while Julia Davis set a new benchmark for comic cruelty."

Most Powerful People in TV Comedy
Year	Person	Top ten	Ref.
2003	Ricky Gervais	2nd: Steve Coogan; 3rd: Graham Norton; 4th: Lorraine Heggessey; 4th: Jane Root (Note: Heggessey and Root were jointly awarded fourth position on the 2003 TV comedy list.); 6th: Talkback Productions; 7th: Paul Whitehouse; 8th: Sacha Baron Cohen; 9th: Danielle Lux; 10th: Jonathan Ross	
2004	Graham Norton	2nd: Peter Kay; 3rd: Ricky Gervais; 4th: Jonathan Ross; 5th: Lorraine Heggessey; 6th: Craig Cash; 7th: Jane Root; 8th: Peter Fincham; 9th: Steve Coogan; 10th: Matt Lucas and David Walliams	
2005	Matt Lucas and David Walliams	2nd: Peter Kay; 3rd: Ricky Gervais; 4th: Jonathan Ross; 5th: Ant & Dec; 6th: Craig Cash; 7th: Julia Davis; 8th: Rob Brydon; 9th: Kevin Lygo; 10th: Richard Curtis	

== TV drama ==
Following the publication of the 'Most Powerful People in TV Comedy' polls, Radio Times published another listing in July 2004, charting the most powerful British personalities in TV drama. At number one was the actress Julie Walters, who had won her third British Academy Television Award earlier that year for her performance in the episode "The Wife of Bath" of the 2003 series Canterbury Tales. In a statement, Radio Times praised Walters's "remarkable" track record and commended her as someone "who can deliver critical acclaim and ratings success". Jane Tranter, the controller of drama commissioning for the BBC, who had been placed second in the poll, also commended Walters's "universal appeal", saying that she had "the ability to represent all of us, no matter what the age, class or situation of her role".

The 'Most Powerful People in TV Drama' list was compiled based on votes from actors, writers, directors, agents and producers in the United Kingdom. After Walters and Tranter, the third-place position went to the British actor David Jason, while ITV's controller of network drama, Nick Elliott, was fourth. The only writer in the top ten was Paul Abbott, creator of State of Play, Clocking Off and Shameless, in fifth place. Tamzin Outhwaite, who had recently appeared in the dramas Red Cap and Out of Control, was the only soap star to make the list. Speaking about the lack of soap actors, Radio Times remarked: "We've taken the view that any actor in a soap derives their power from the programme until they prove themselves elsewhere."

Most Powerful People in Drama
Year	Person	Top ten	Ref.
2004	Julie Walters	2nd: Jane Tranter; 3rd: David Jason; 4th: Nick Elliott; 5th: Paul Abbott; 6th: James Nesbitt; 7th: Lorraine Heggessey; 8th: Martin Clunes; 9th: Mal Young; 10th: Caroline Quentin	

== Radio ==
The third 'Most Powerful People' list that Radio Times created in June 2005, recognised the 40 most influential people in British radio. The listing was based on the opinions of 70 industry experts from both the BBC and commercial radio, and was restricted to current broadcasters. The winner was the DJ and TV host Jonathan Ross, who was placed at number one as a result of the success of his "cheeky" Saturday programme on BBC Radio 2. Fellow Radio 2 presenter Steve Wright described Ross as "one of the wittiest people on radio" who "doesn't follow any of the rules". Ross had previously been placed in the top 10 of all three of 'Most Powerful People in TV Comedy' lists, peaking at number four in both 2004 and 2005.

Radio 2 was the second most successful national station on the list, with nine names in the top 40. The most successful was BBC Radio 4 with 13, while Radio 5 Live was third with eight. Terry Wogan, Ross's colleague at Radio 2, was named the second most powerful person in radio as a result of his breakfast show regularly achieving more than eight million listeners. Accepting the honour, Ross praised Wogan, saying that he "set the benchmark for others to aspire to". As of May 2010, Ross kept a copy of the issue of Radio Times naming him the most powerful person in radio in his office, next to a caricature of himself falling down a sewer in a Dennis the Menace cartoon.

Most Powerful People in Radio
Year	Person (Station)	Top ten	Ref.
2005	Jonathan Ross (BBC Radio 2)	2nd: Terry Wogan (BBC Radio 2); 3rd: John Humphrys (BBC Radio 4); 4th: Christian O'Connell (Xfm and BBC Radio 5 Live); 5th: Eddie Mair (BBC Radio 4); 6th: Peter Allen (BBC Radio 5 Live); 7th: Chris Moyles (BBC Radio 1); 8th: Zane Lowe (BBC Radio 1); 9th: Jane Garvey (BBC Radio 5 Live); 10th: Chris Evans (Note: At the time of the list's publication, Evans did not have a regular radio programme and had instead been occasionally presenting on BBC Radio 2.)	
