= Anthony Flanagan =

British actor (born 1972)

- Born: 11 April 1972 (age 54); Stockport, England
- Education: Manchester Metropolitan University (BA)
- Occupation: Actor
- Years active: 2001–present

Anthony Flanagan (born 11 April 1972) is an English actor most widely known for his portrayal of policeman Tony in Channel 4's comedy-drama series Shameless.

== Biography ==
Flanagan was born in Stockport, Cheshire. After leaving Grange Comprehensive School, in Oldham, he worked as a joiner and a builder. At 17 he went to London. Flanagan decided to become an actor after seeing a friend of his sister perform at RADA.

Flanagan studied at Oldham College and Capitol Theatre in Manchester (now Manchester Metropolitan University) Flanagan's first professional job was in a lead role at the RSC (Royal Shakespeare Company) in the 2001/02 season, playing Pat Harford in Peter Whelan's play A Russian in the Woods. (Flanagan would later reflect on the experience of appearing on stage naked.) This led to a collaboration with writer and theatre critic Richard Edmonds on a one-man show on the life of Baudelaire entitled King of a Rainy Country.

Notable work includes roles series in Shameless, Vincent, Cracker (where his roles as Kenny Archer in the 2006 TV film was almost universally praised despite mixed critical reaction to the comeback show itself), Life on Mars, Foyle's War, All About George, Casualty, Holby City, The Bill, Spooks, Spooks: Code 9, Doctor Who, Survivors and Red Riding. He played his first major lead role in the short serial Instinct, broadcast in February 2007 and was due to appear in the West End in Glengarry Glen Ross in October 2007 but withdrew due to 'personal reasons'.

Flanagan appeared in the BBC TV docudrama Heroes and Villains as Spartacus, first broadcast in 2008. He breaks the character of 'virile Roman hero' and appears full of doubt, irascible and Shakespearean. The series was successful in Europe and the United States, and was noted for the credibility of its historic sources. He took on the role of villain Dexter in BBC's Survivors (2009–10); the character is killed in series 2 episode 3 (BBC later announced that the shooting of season 3 would be cancelled). In 2009 he played the dogged but doomed journalist Barry Gannon in Red Riding; set in 1974, it is the first film in the Red Riding Trilogy. Initially a Channel 4 series, the trilogy has been successful all over the world, and regularly featured on the European film festival circuit, winning many awards. Flanagan was scheduled to appear in the film Acts of Godfrey, which filmed in early 2010; however, he didn't appear due to theatre commitments. He briefly appears in Glorious 39 (2009), a British production written and directed by Stephen Poliakoff.

2010 was the year of Flanagan's theatre comeback. The ex-RSC came to the Birmingham Rep Theatre for a new adaptation of Chekhov's Cherry Orchard beside Josie Lawrence, where his performance was very well received.

In 2011, Flanagan played the role of Steve in Life on the Line, a short film by Jamie Donaghue.

He also played in ITV's BAFTA award-winning drama Appropriate Adult as Mike playing opposite Emily Watson, who won a BAFTA for Best Leading Actress for her role as Janet Leech in the same film.

In 2012 Flanagan appeared as Fergus in Series 4 of Being Human. He then appeared as Andy in Julie Gearey's Prisoners' Wives, a BBC One drama about how women deal with life after their husbands and families are sent to prison.

Also in 2012 Flanagan returned as a Detective Chief Inspector in BBC One's Silent Witness to play D.C.I. Ronson.

In 2012 Flanagan worked and appeared in three films:

- He plays the Recruiting Sergeant in Private Peaceful, based on Michael Morpurgo's novel of the same name, which was adapted for the screen by Simon Readeand and was directed by Pat O'Connor.
- He appears in Kadri Kousaar's film The Arbiter as Mickey.
- He played the title role in Klaus Huttmann's feature film The List.

Flanagan plays Arnold Hankin, a self-made successful businessman, in The Village, broadcast on BBC One in 2013 and 2014 – an epic drama charting the turbulent times of one English village. The six-part series was directed by Antonia Bird, who directed Flanagan once before in Cracker, and also by Gillies MacKinnon.

Flanagan can be seen in Jimmy McGovern's Moving On and in the second series of Shetland, shown on BBC One in 2014.

== Personal life ==
He is married to actress Rebekah Staton.

== Filmography ==
=== Film ===
Year	Title	Role	Notes
2004	Trauma	Large Man 2	
2009	Glorious 39	Military Policeman	
2012	Private Peaceful	Recruiting Sergeant	
2013	The Arbiter	Mickey	
2013	The List	Christopher Corwin	
2014	Life on the Line	Steve	Short film
2016	The People Next Door	Dennis	Television film
2016	Marina and Adrienne	Jeremiah	Short film
2018	God's Kingdom	Jack	Short film
2018	Care	Dave	Television film
2020	Stardust	Dr. Reynolds	

=== Television ===
Year	Title	Role	Notes
2002	Foyle's War	Policeman 2	Episode: "A Lesson in Murder"
2002	Holby City	Chris Scott	Episode: "Last Chances"
2003	The Bill	Dexter Barnes	Recurring role; 2 episodes
2003	Buried	Collitt	Episode: "Episode 5"
2003	Real Men	James Mulgrew	Miniseries; 2 episodes
2003	Murder Investigation Team	Dexter Barnes	Episode: "Moving Targets"
2003	State of Play	Young Guy	Miniseries; 2 episodes
2004	Red Cap	Sergeant Stuart Hodnett	Episode: "Red Light"
2004–2006	Shameless	Tony	Recurring role; 17 episodes
2005	Casualty	Phil Ryder	Episode: "All's Fair in Love and War"
2005	All About George	Luke	Recurring role; 2 episodes
2006	Coming Up	Goose	Episode: "The Trial"
2006	Foyle's War	Tom Jenkins	Episode: "Bad Blood"
2006	Life on Mars	Pete Bond	Episode: "Series 1, Episode 5"
2006	Mayo	Steven Marshall	Episode: "Requiem for a Dove"
2006	Cracker	Kenny Archer	Episode: "Nine Eleven"
2006	Vincent	Gavin West	Episode: "Soldiers of a False Army"
2006	Spooks	Craig Fletcher	Episode: "Aftermath"
2007	Casualty	Steve Harwood	Episode: "A House Divided"
2007	Instinct	D.C.I. Thomas Flynn	Miniseries; 2 episodes
2007	Doctor Who	Orin Scannell	Episode: "42"
2008	Heroes and Villains	Spartacus	Episode: "Spartacus"
2008	Spooks: Code 9	Tom	Episode: "The Ghost Man"
2008	Coming Up	Sirjad	Episode: "The Circle"
2008–2010	Survivors	Dexter	Recurring role; 3 episodes
2009	The Bill	Oliver Robinson	Episode: "Conviction: Cover Up"
2009	Casualty	Lee	Episode: "Dawn of the E.D."
2009	Blue Murder	Gavin Turner	Episode: "Tooth and Claw"
2011	New Tricks	Anthony Bassett	Episode: "Tiger Tiger"
2011	Appropriate Adult	Mike	Miniseries; 2 episodes
2012	Being Human	Fergus	Recurring role; 3 episodes
2012	Prisoners' Wives	Andy	Recurring role; 5 episodes
2012	Silent Witness	Ronson	Episode: "Domestic"
2012	Rocket's Island	Peter Boulsworth	Main role; 3 episodes (season 1)
2013	Moving On	Greg	Episode: "Hush Little Baby"
2013–2014	The Village	Arnold Hankin	Series regular; 12 episodes
2014	Shetland	Ewan Ross	Episode: "Raven Black"
2014	In the Flesh	Julian	Recurring role; 2 episodes
2014	The Secrets	Nigel	Episode: "The Visitor"
2015	Inspector George Gently	Petey Magath	Episode: "Gently Among Friends"
2016	Scott & Bailey	Kenny Medford	Recurring role; 2 episodes
2016	The Crown	Thurman	Episode: "Act of God"
2016	Humans	Jansen	Recurring role; 2 episodes
2017	The White Princess	Francis Lovell	Recurring role; 3 episodes
2018	The Terror	John Morfin	Recurring role; 6 episodes
2018	Versailles	Bastien de Pin	Series regular; 9 episodes
2019	Wild Bill	PC Sean Cobley	Series regular; 6 episodes
2019	I Am...	Peter	Episode: "I Am Kirsty"
2019–2022	Gentleman Jack	Samuel Sowden / Ben Sowden	Recurring role; 4 episodes
2020	Dracula	Portmann	Episode: "Blood Vessel"
2021	Endeavour	Flavian Creech	Episode: "Terminus"
2021	Around the World in 80 Days	Thomas Kneedling	Recurring role; 5 episodes
2022–2024	House of the Dragon	Ser Steffon Darklyn	Recurring role; 9 episodes
2023	Happy Valley	Viktor	Recurring role; 4 episodes
2023	Mrs Sidhu Investigates	Pitbull	Episode: "Breaking Convention"
2023	COBRA	Dan Goddard	Recurring role; 5 episodes
2024	Vera	Chris Worsten	Final Episode: "The Dark Wives"
