= Instinct (TV serial) =

2007 British TV serial

- Genre: Crime drama; Thriller
- Written by: Lizzie Mickery
- Directed by: Terry McDonough
- Starring: Anthony Flanagan; Tom Ward; Christine Bottomley; Jaye Griffiths; Fiona Glascott; Paul Ritter
- Theme music composer: Tim Phillips
- Country of origin: United Kingdom
- Original language: English
- No. of series: 1
- No. of episodes: 2 (list of episodes)

Production
- Executive producers: Lizzie Mickery; Hilary Bevan-Jones; Paul Abbott
- Producer: Paul Frift
- Production locations: Rossendale Valley, Lancashire Pennines
- Running time: 90 minutes
- Production company: Tightrope Pictures

Original release
- Network: ITV
- Release: 26 February – 27 February 2007

Instinct is a two-part drama serial which premièred on ITV on 26 February 2007. It was created and written by Lizzie Mickery, and produced by Tightrope Pictures for ITV. The serial follows Detective Chief Inspector Thomas Flynn, played by Anthony Flanagan, as he hunts a serial killer in the Lancashire Pennines, while dealing with a troubled personal life.

== Overview ==
Mickery, who had previously written the first three series of the similarly themed Messiah, described Instinct as a character-driven whodunit, which placed the emotional lives of the characters at the forefront of the drama. In creating the lead character of Thomas Flynn, she wanted to explore "why sometimes somebody who is a good detective is fallible as a man." Flynn is a thirtysomething, contemporary character who is not "the usual middle-aged detective, disillusioned and world weary with a broken marriage and a love of scotch." Flynn's defining characteristics are that he relishes his work, is emotionally detached and has acute powers of observation.

Flanagan described the case investigated by Flynn as a rites of passage. He said: "Events in his personal life - he discovers he has a half-sister and that throws him totally - begin to impinge on the investigation. That makes it far more interesting than any of the stuff concerned with the procedural side of police work."

Mickery and Flanagan both expressed hopes that Instinct would return, with Flanagan stating that the end of the second episode felt like a beginning for his character. ITV did not recommission it, and no further episodes were made.

== Setting ==
Mickery opted to set Instinct away from the anonymity of a large city, choosing the Lancashire Pennines to provide an atmospheric backdrop to the plot. She described the Pennines as "an extraordinary place. It has that sense of humanity clinging on to nature ... it's beautiful but daunting."

Instinct was filmed in and around the Rossendale Valley. Some scenes were shot on location in Bacup, where the town library was transformed into a police station, and a police chase was filmed through the gardens of local houses.

== Cast and characters ==
- Anthony Flanagan as DCI Thomas Flynn: The protagonist, an introverted detective who has risen speedily through the ranks thanks to his incisive mind and observational skills. He is prone to making instinctive leaps of intuition. The emotional detachment that makes him so brilliant a detective is threatened when he is confronted with his past in the form of his comatose estranged father, and meets his half-sister, Milly, for the first time.
- Tom Ward as Ian Stanford: Stanford comes under police scrutiny after the murder of his wife, Megan. Shortly after her death he is reunited with the son he never knew he had, Jake, the result of a sperm donation nineteen years before. His newly discovered family ties place him in symmetry to Thomas Flynn, with whom he forms a tacit friendship as the investigation progresses.
- Christine Bottomley as Milly: Flynn's half-sister. Vivacious and outspoken, she is a single mother to a young son, Sid.
- Jaye Griffiths as DS Shakia Barton: Flynn's right-hand woman.
- Fiona Glascott as DC Ali Peters: A junior member of Flynn's team.
- Paul Ritter as DC Daniel Yelland: A junior member of Flynn's team.
- Claire Hackett as Sue Richards: The mother of Ian Stanford's son, Jake.
- Michael Hodgson as Phil Richards: The husband of Sue Richards who has brought up her son, Jake, as his own.
- Liam Boyle as Jake Richards: The biological son of Ian Stanford and Sue Richards.

== Episode list ==
No.	Title	Directed by	Written by	Original release date	Viewers (millions)
1	"Episode 1"	Terry McDonough	Lizzie Mickery	26 February 2007	6.26
DCI Thomas Flynn arrives at the hospital bedside of his estranged father, as Ian Stanford returns home to discover his wife, Megan, missing and their bedroom in disarray and covered in blood. Megan's body is later found dumped on waste ground, a torn piece of newspaper dated the day of her death clutched in her left hand. Ian is questioned by Flynn, who is leading the investigation, and then put under surveillance. Ian receives a surprise visit from his son, Jake Richards, the product of a sperm donation he made as a student. At the hospital Flynn meets his half-sister, Milly, and later her young son, Sid. When Jake's DNA is found on the scarf Megan was strangled with, he is arrested, and Ian meets his mother, Sue, for the first time. The two are immediately drawn to each other, intrigued by the notion that they are strangers and yet have made a child together. After Jake is released from custody, Ian surprises him and Sue with tickets to a football match. The three drive off together, with Sue's husband Phil looking on jealously. Flynn discovers that his father, who left the family home when he was a child, loves and is proud of him, contrary to what he has always believed. Plastic surgeon Anthony Snoden disappears from his clinic and is later found dead in a disused warehouse, with the date of his death carved into his hand. After an uneasy start to their relationship, Flynn finds himself increasingly drawn to Milly.
2	"Episode 2"	Terry McDonough	Lizzie Mickery	27 February 2007	4.42
A third murder victim, Rob Evans, is found. Flynn is unhappy to learn that Milly is going on a blind date, and asks DCs Ali Peters and Daniel Yelland to watch her to ensure her safety. Ian sleeps with Sue, and is attacked by a furious Phil. A local funeral director goes missing, and is found dead in a coffin, a dated funeral service sheet in his left hand. Daniel and Ali recognise Phil, who has been arrested for attacking Ian, as the man Milly was on a date with. Flynn interviews Phil alone and without a tape recording, and warns him to stay away from Milly. Neil Langley, Ian's lawyer, who also has links to Anthony Snoden and Rob Evans, is interviewed by Flynn and DS Shakia Barton, and later becomes the fifth victim of the serial killer. Flynn's father dies, and at the hospital he makes an intuitive leap connecting Ian to the murders, while Ali discovers a connection between them: arranged diagonally, the locations of the deaths spell out T-H-O-M-A. Milly goes missing, and Flynn realises she has been taken by the killer, then deduces her location, providing the final S in the sequence. He confronts Ian, as the team find Milly tied to a rope and hanging face down in the canal. An incarcerated Ian tells Flynn that carrying out the murders made him powerful and attractive to his newfound family - he has finally discovered something he is good at. Flynn visits the hospital with Sid, where they are reunited with a recovering Milly.

== Awards ==
Instinct won Best Single Drama or Drama Serial at the Royal Television Society North West Awards 2007.

== Reception ==
Instinct made its debut on ITV with ratings of 6.26 million. Viewing figures for the second and final episode fell to 4.42 million.

It received mixed reviews from critics; Jane Simon, writing for The Mirror, said: "To really succeed as a TV detective you've got to have a gimmick. DCI Thomas Flynn's is instinct - but you probably could have worked that out from the title." She added: "While Flynn might be able to glance at a bloody crime scene and leap to some helpful conclusions, audiences might find this dark new drama a little bewildering." James Walton, reviewing the first episode for The Daily Telegraph, commented that the drama had been "bogged down" by its emphasis on the psychological, adding that the "solemn pondering of fathers and sons has so far got in the way of the thrills – but without being fresh, gripping or indeed believable enough to justify its position at centre stage." Digital Spy's Dek Hogan described the plot as "unnecessarily convoluted", and said the serial was "downbeat, one paced and frankly monotonous ... quite why it took three hours to tell a tale that [could] easily have been told far more economically in one is a far bigger mystery than the one this unmemorable bunch of coppers were trying to solve."

Harry Venning, writing for The Stage, considered Instinct a "deliciously gruesome, coldly efficient murder mystery." The Guardian's Gareth McLean believed the character of DCI Flynn was compelling and had "real potential", and praised the serial for both its look and script. Writing after the decision not to recommission it was taken, he described it as having "the makings of a long-running, iconic detective show with the obligatory troubled, idiosyncratic protagonist."
