= BBC television drama =

Type of television series from the United Kingdom

BBC television dramas have been produced and broadcast since even before the public service company had an officially established television broadcasting network in the United Kingdom. As with any major broadcast network, drama forms an important part of its schedule, with many of the BBC's top-rated programmes being from this genre.

From the 1950s through to the 1980s the BBC received much acclaim for the range and scope of its drama productions, producing series, serials and plays across a range of genres, from soap opera to science-fiction to costume drama, with the 1970s in particular being regarded as a critical and cultural high point in terms of the quality of dramas being produced. In the 1990s, a time of change in the British television industry, the department went through much internal confusion and external criticism, but since the beginning of the 21st century has begun to return to form with a run of critical and popular successes, despite continual accusations of the drama output and the BBC in general dumbing down.

Many BBC productions have also been exported to and screened in other countries, particularly in the United States on the Public Broadcasting Service (PBS) Masterpiece Theatre strand and latterly on the BBC's own BBC America cable channel. Other major purchasers of BBC dramas include the BBC's equivalents in other Commonwealth nations, such as Australia's ABC, Canada's CBC and Gibraltar's Gibraltar Broadcasting Corporation (GBC).

== Experimental broadcasting and the 1930s ==
Already an established national radio broadcaster, the BBC began test transmissions with the new technology of television in 1929, working with John Logie Baird and using his primitive early apparatus. The following year, as part of one of these test transmissions, the BBC screened their first television drama production, an adaptation of the Italian playwright Luigi Pirandello's short play The Man With the Flower in His Mouth.

Broadcast live at 3.30pm on 14 July 1930, the play was produced from a small studio in the Baird Company headquarters at 133 Long Acre, London. The play was chosen because of its confined setting, small cast and short length, and was directed by Val Gielgud, who was at the time the BBC's senior producer of radio drama. Because of the primitive 30-line camera technology, only one figure could be shown on screen at a time and the field of vision of the cameras was extremely restricted. The Prime Minister of the day, Ramsay MacDonald, watched the play with his family on the Baird Televisor Baird had previously installed at their 10 Downing Street home. The reviewer for The Times newspaper commented that: "This afternoon on the roof of 133, Long Acre will prove to be a memorable one... The time for interest and curiosity is come, but the time for serious criticism of television plays, as plays, is not yet."

The BBC's test broadcasts continued throughout the early part of the decade as the quality of the medium improved. In 1936 the BBC launched the world's first "high-definition"—then defined as at least 240-lines — television channel, the BBC Television Service, from studios in a specially converted wing of Alexandra Palace in London. At the time of the channel's debut on 2 November 1936 there were only five television producers responsible for the entire output. The producer selected to oversee drama was George More O'Ferrall, who had some experience with working in a visual medium as he was a former assistant director of films. This was unlike most of his colleagues, who came across from the BBC's radio services.

The first drama production to be mounted as a part of the new, regular service was a twenty-five-minute selection of scenes from the West End play Marigold by L. Allen Harker and F. R. Pryor, produced by O'Ferrall with the original London Royalty Theatre cast. This was broadcast live from the Alexandra Palace studios on the evening of Friday 6 November 1936. Later BBC Television Head of Drama Shaun Sutton wrote about the production for The Times in 1972. "It was probably little more than a photographed version of the stage production, with the camera lying well back to preserve the picture-frame convention of the theatre." Most initial drama efforts were of a similar scale; productions of selected dramatised 'scenes' or excerpts from popular novels and adaptations of stage plays, and a programme entitled Theatre Parade would regularly use original London theatre casts for re-enacting selected scenes.

An increasing number of full-length dramatised productions began to take place in the Alexandra Palace studios during 1937, with Journey's End in November 1937 being a notable full-scale adaptation of a play. When television transmissions on Sundays began in March 1938, one Sunday per month would see the broadcast of a full-length Shakespeare play by actors from the Birmingham Repertory Theatre. Productions also become more technically advanced, with the use of film inserts on telecine and more ambitious shooting, cutting and mixing, as opposed to televising the equivalent of a standard theatrical performance with unmoving cameras. Outside broadcast cameras were used to show thirty Territorial Army troops with two howitzers in the Alexandra Palace grounds for added effect in The White Chateau (1938), and boats on the Palace lake in scenes depicting the Zeebrugge Raid in a World War I play.

The Times credited the ambition of BBC television drama in its review of a July 1938 modern dress version of Julius Caesar, while also criticising some of the production's technical failings.

"From the moment when Mr. Sebastian Shaw and Mr. Anthony Ireland were discovered sitting at a café table, discussing the political situation over a glass of beer, looking like two Fascist officers, yet speaking the lines assigned to Brutus and Cassius, the attention of the audience was riveted... The penumbrascope, a device for providing a background by means of shadows, which came into play for the first time in this production, was used so carelessly that its edges were often visible. The essence of stagecraft is illusion, which must not be shattered by such accidents. Caesar's ghost was also very unconvincing, nor did the handful of people listening to the funeral orations suggest an excited mob."

Greater praise was given by the same paper to Felicity's First Season, broadcast in September 1938 and, unusually for the time, written directly for television.

"The play relies on dialogue throughout, and there is a skilful use of film to suggest the journey to Scotland. While there are few characters and little change of scenery, enormous cocktail parties, balls, and jumble sales seemed to be in progress just out of sight. The result was something between a stage play and a film—that is to say, good television entertainment."

The overwhelming majority of BBC television drama produced during the 1930s consisted of adaptations of stage plays, but there were exceptions. These included the first multi-episodic drama serial, Ann and Harold, a five-part story about a married couple which began showing on 12 July 1938. There was also Telecrime, a series of ten- and twenty-minute plays which presented various crimes, with the viewers given enough clues to be able to solve themselves using the evidence shown on screen and the specially-written drama Condemned To Be Shot (1939).

As with almost all programmes of the era, the live television broadcasts meant that no record of the drama productions were kept outside of photographs, scripts and press reviews. The BBC Programme Organiser Cecil Madden later claimed that they had experimented with telerecording a production of The Scarlet Pimpernel, but were ordered by film director Alexander Korda to destroy the print as he felt it infringed his film rights.

Despite the difficulties and challenges its production often presented, drama had become a central part of the BBC's television schedules; a BBC audience research survey conducted in 1937 found that 90% of those replying generally enjoyed the drama productions, a figure equalled only by outside broadcasts. In Christmas week 1938, drama accounted for fourteen of the twenty-two hours of programming broadcast. By the following year, drama programming had fifteen producers working on it, compared to nine for all other types of programmes combined.

In 1939, the total audience for the BBC's programmes had grown to an estimated audience of 100,000 viewers, watching on 20,000 television sets. However, BBC television broadcasting ceased on 1 September 1939 in anticipation of World War II. The station remained off-air for the duration of the conflict. The British Government were afraid that the VHF transmission signals would act as a guiding beacon for German bombers targeting central London, and the technicians and engineers of the service would in any case be needed for war efforts such as the radar programme.

== The return of television and the 1950s ==
BBC Television resumed broadcasting on 7 June 1946, and the service began in much the same way it had ceased in 1939, with many of the 1930s drama producers returning. In 1949 there was a major development in drama when Val Gielgud was made the new head of department, a position he had previously and successfully occupied at BBC Radio. Since producing the first television play in 1930, Gielgud had worked in television again, serving on attachment to the service at Alexandra Palace in 1939 and directing a half-hour adaptation of his own short story Ending It, starring John Robinson and Joan Marion and broadcast on 25 August 1939, less than a week before the service was placed on hiatus.

Gielgud was an unpopular choice with many in the television service, with the channel's controller, Norman Collins, protesting that "Anything less than complete familiarity with all aspects of television production will mean... that the Head of Television Drama is an amateur." Gielgud himself felt that television drama was too influenced by the cinema and ought to be closer to its radio equivalent, with television plays being more like illustrated radio broadcasts than independent entities in and of themselves. Gielgud eventually returned to radio, being replaced as Head of Drama by his assistant, the experienced producer Michael Barry, in 1952.

One important move that had occurred under Gielgud was the establishment in 1950 of the Script Department, and the hiring of the television service's first in-house staff drama writers, Nigel Kneale and Philip Mackie.^{5} Gielgud began to commission new drama, such as Jack Hulbert's The Golden Year in 1951, a contribution to the Festival of Britain and something of a throw-back to a previous age, as it was the first ever musical comedy made for television. Barry later expanded the Script Department and installed the experienced film producer Donald Wilson as its head in 1955. Television was now developing beyond simply adapting stories from other media into creating its own originally written productions. It was also becoming a high-profile medium, with national coverage and viewing figures now running into the millions, helped by the explosion of interest due to the live televising of the coronation of Queen Elizabeth II in the summer of 1953. ^{5}

That same year, Barry invested the majority of his original scripting budget into a six-part science-fiction serial written by Kneale and directed by Rudolph Cartier, an Austrian-born director who was establishing a reputation as the television service's most inventive practitioner. Entitled The Quatermass Experiment, the serial (miniseries in American terminology) was a huge success and went a long way towards popularising the form, where one story is told over a short number of episodes, on British television: it is still one of the most popular drama formats in the medium to this day. Kneale and Cartier went on to be responsible for two sequel serials and many other highly successful and popular productions over the course of the decade, drawing many viewers to their programmes with their characteristic blend of horror and allegorical science fiction.

It was they who were responsible for the 1954 adaptation of George Orwell's Nineteen Eighty-Four, the second performance of which drew the largest television audience since the coronation, some seven million viewers, and is one of the earliest surviving dramas in the archive. The telerecording process had by now been perfected for capturing live broadcasts for repeat and overseas sales, although it was not until the early 1960s that the majority of BBC dramas were prerecorded on the new technology of videotape. The BBC, unlike American broadcasters, only gradually produced dramas shot entirely on film from the 1960s onwards; ITV's filmed series were in the minority, and most of the commercial channel's drama productions were made in the same 'hybrid' form as those of the BBC. Filmed sequences would be mounted for external scenes which would be pre-shot and inserted into productions at relevant points, later being inserted into shows at the video editing stage. "These sequences bought time for the more elaborate costume changes or scene set-ups, but also served to 'open out' the action," as the British Film Institute explained on its Screenonline website in 2004.

The BBC suffered during the second half of the 1950s from the rise of the ITV network, which had debuted in 1955 and rapidly begun to take away audience share from the Corporation as its coverage spread nationally. Despite popular hits such as the police drama series Dixon of Dock Green and soap opera The Grove Family, the BBC was seen as being more highbrow, lacking the popular common touch of the commercial network. One of the major figures in commercial television drama of the late 1950s and early 1960s was Canadian producer Sydney Newman, the Head of Drama at ABC Weekend TV responsible for such programmes as Armchair Theatre and The Avengers. In December 1962, keen to turn around the fortunes of their own drama department, the BBC invited Newman to replace the retiring Barry as Head of Drama, and he accepted, keen on the idea of transforming what he saw as the staid, docile image of BBC drama. ^{6}

== The 'golden age' of BBC drama ==
Even before Newman's arrival, some BBC producers were attempting to break the mould, with Elwyn Jones, Troy Kennedy Martin and Allan Prior's landmark police drama series Z-Cars shaking up the image of television police dramas and becoming an enormous popular success from 1962 onwards.

Newman, however, restructured the entire department, dividing the unwieldy drama group into three separate divisions: series, for on-going continuing dramas with self-contained episodes; serials, for stories told over multi-episode runs, or programmes which were made up of a series of serials; and plays, for any kind of drama one-offs, an area Newman was especially keen on following the success of Armchair Theatre at ABC.

Newman followed BBC Managing Director of Television Sir Huw Wheldon's famous edict to "make the good popular and the popular good," once stating: "damn the upper classes! They don't even own televisions!" While he did personally create populist family-entertainment-based dramas such as Adam Adamant Lives! and the science-fiction series Doctor Who, he also attempted to create drama that was socially relevant to those who were watching, initiating The Wednesday Play anthology strand to present contemporary dramas with a social background the resonance. Screenonline notes of this development, "It was from this artistic high of the 'golden age' of British TV drama (this 'agitational contemporaneity', as Newman coined it) that a new generation of TV playwrights emerged."

Anthology series The Wednesday Play proved to be a breeding ground for acclaimed and sometimes controversial writers such as Dennis Potter and directors such as Ken Loach, but sometimes Newman's desire to create biting, cutting drama could land the Corporation in trouble. This was particularly the case with 1965's The War Game by Peter Watkins, which depicted a fictional nuclear attack on the UK and its aftermath and was banned by the BBC under pressure from the government; it was eventually screened on television in 1985.

Cathy Come Home, a 1966 entry into The Wednesday Play, was voted the best drama and second highest programme overall in the British Film Institute's 2000 survey of the 100 Greatest British Television Programmes of the 20th century.

Newman's reign saw a large number of popular and critically acclaimed dramas go out on the BBC, with Doctor Who, Z-Cars, Doctor Finlay's Casebook and the epic The Forsyte Saga picking up viewers while the likes of The Wednesday Play and Theatre 625 presented challenging ideas to the audience. Newman left the staff of the BBC once his five-year contract expired at the end of 1967, departing for an unsuccessful attempt to break into the film industry. He was replaced by Head of Serials Shaun Sutton, initially on an acting basis combined with his existing role, but permanently from 1969.^{7}

Sutton became the BBC's longest-serving Head of Drama, serving as such until 1981 and during the BBC's move from black and white into colour broadcasting. His tenure covered took the entire decade of the 1970s, a time when the BBC enjoyed large viewing figures, positive audience reaction, and generally high production values across a range of programmes, with drama enjoying a particularly well-received spell. The Wednesday Play transformed into the equally celebrated and longer running Play for Today in 1970; later in the decade the BBC began a period of producing every single Shakespeare play, a run in which Sutton himself took over the producer's role following his departure from the Head of Drama position in the early 1980s.

Popular dramas such as Doctor Who and Z-Cars continued into the new decade, and were joined by costume dramas following The Forsyte Saga such as The Pallisers, The Onedin Line and Poldark. Family-audience based period dramas, often adaptations such as The Eagle of the Ninth (1977), were popular on Sunday afternoons, with the 'Classic Serial' strand which ran there becoming something of an institution until the early 1990s. Another success between 1973 and 1977 was the popular Warship drama series, filmed with a documentary-like look for 45 episodes over four seasons on a Royal Navy frigate. Along with many BBC dramas of the decade, Warship was also very successful in countries such as Ireland and Australia.

There were also failures, however. The epic Churchill's People, 26 50-minute episodes based around Winston Churchill's A History of the English-Speaking Peoples, was deemed unbroadcastable by Sutton after he had viewed the initial episodes, but so much time and money had been invested in huge pre-transmission publicity that the BBC had no choice but to show the plays, to critical derision and tiny viewing figures. Never again would a 50-minute series be given a run as long as 26 episodes, for fear of being too committed to a project; runs of 13 became the norm, although in later years even this began to be considered quite long. Plays such as Dennis Potter's Brimstone and Treacle and Roy Minton's Scum were not broadcast at all due to fears over their content at the highest levels of the BBC, although despite this Potter continued to write landmark drama serials and one-offs for the Corporation throughout the rest of the decade and into the 1980s. Both Brimstone and Treacle and Scum were eventually transmitted some years later.

Whenever writers and media analysts criticise the current state of British and particularly BBC television drama, it is frequently the 1960s and 1970s period which they cite as being the most important and influential, with a vast variety of genres (science fiction, crime, historical, family based) and types of programme (series, serials, one-offs, anthologies) being produced. "What may justly be rated as the golden age of television drama reached its zenith," as The Guardian described it in their 2004 obituary of Sutton. Or in the words of the Royal Television Society, "...an era that championed new writers, young directors and challenging drama. The amazing diversity... helped to make it the golden age of broadcasting."

However, despite this high esteem, much television drama of the era does not exist in the archives. The live output was generally not recorded at all, while programming from the 1960s was usually wiped for contractual reasons or perceived as being of no further use. This practice means some series are completely missing, such as United!, a football-based soap opera which ran from 1965 to 1967. Others have large gaps; Dixon of Dock Green has only about 30 of its more than 400 episodes surviving from its 20-year run.

== Changing attitudes in the 1980s and beyond ==
Following Sutton's departure from the Head of Drama role in 1981 and his return to front-line producing duties in the Shakespeare cycle, his place as Head of Drama was taken by Graeme MacDonald. MacDonald had been Head of Serials and later Head of Series & Serials under Sutton, with the two departments having been merged in 1980, remaining so for most of the decade before separating again at the end of it. MacDonald maintained the status quo, and was only Head of Drama for a short time before he was promoted again to run a channel as Controller of BBC2. He was succeeded in turn by his own Head of Series & Serials, Jonathan Powell.

Powell had been a producer of high-quality all-film drama serials such as Tinker Tailor Soldier Spy (1979) and its sequel Smiley's People (1982), and he very much favoured this form of short-run, self-contained filmed serial over longer-running videotaped drama series. It was under his aegis, therefore, that the BBC produced some of its highest-quality examples of this type of drama, of particular note being 1985's Edge of Darkness by Troy Kennedy Martin, and the following year's Dennis Potter piece The Singing Detective, both regarded as seminal BBC drama productions. "A gripping, innovative six-part drama which fully deserves its cult status and many awards," was the British Film Institute's verdict on Edge of Darkness in 2000.

Powell also oversaw the rise of more populist continuing drama series, however, encouraged by the ratings-chasing strategy of the then Controller of BBC1, his friend Michael Grade. It was during Powell's tenure that the BBC launched the twice-weekly soap opera EastEnders (1985–present) and the medical drama Casualty (1986–present), both of which remain linchpins of the BBC One schedule today and the highest-rated drama productions on BBC television. Indeed, EastEnders achieved phenomenal success in its early years, its Christmas Day 1986 episode earning a massive 30.15 million viewers, the highest British television audience of the 1980s.Aside from these continuing dramas, based in one major location and shot entirely on videotape and thus comparatively cheap to make, longer runs of drama series became rare, with short series of six or eight episodes becoming the norm.

The single play, in its original studio-based form, also began to disappear from the schedules, with the final series of Play for Today airing in 1984, and the last single drama recorded at Television Centre being Henry IV, Part 1 in 1995. The BBC was envious of the success of its rival Channel 4's newly formed film arm, which had seen made-for-television one-offs such as Stephen Frears' My Beautiful Laundrette (1985) gain cinematic releases to considerable success. New strands such as Screen One and Screen Two concentrated on short runs of all-film, cinematic-style one-off dramas, with the most successful of these being Anthony Minghella's Truly, Madly, Deeply (Screen Two, 1990) which became a successful film released to cinemas. (Screen One and Two ran until 1994.)

The Plays department eventually disappeared altogether, being replaced latterly with a 'Head of Film & Single Drama' position with autonomous powers for investing in feature film production, co-commissioning television one-offs with the Head of Drama. This interest in film production is perhaps best demonstrated by the fact that both of Powell's successors as Head of Drama, Mark Shivas (1988–93) and Charles Denton (1993–96), went on to work in the film industry after leaving the position.

Another major change to BBC production methods in all areas, but particularly affecting drama, occurred the passing of the Broadcasting Act 1990, which amongst other things obliged the BBC to commission 25% of its output from independent production companies. Many BBC drama productions were subsequently outsourced to and commissioned from independent companies, although the BBC's in-house production arm continued to contribute heavily, with the separate Drama Series and Serials departments remaining intact. Production arms such as costumes, make-up and special effects were all closed by the early 21st century, however, with these services now being bought in from outside even for in-house programmes.

Jonathan Powell's attempt to repeat the success of EastEnders in 1992, when he had become Controller of BBC One, led to one of the BBC's most notorious and costly failures. Eldorado was set in the British expatriate community in Spain, created by the same team of Julia Smith and Tony Holland who had come up with EastEnders. The costly soap opera, hugely maligned by critics and the victim of a viewer backlash against the massive advertising campaign the BBC had undertaken to promote it, was scrapped by Powell's successor Alan Yentob after less than a year's run, under pressure from the Director-General of the BBC John Birt.

The 1990s saw a rise in the popularity of costume drama adaptations of literary classics, mostly adapted by the acclaimed screenwriter Andrew Davies. One of the most successful of these was a 1995 adaptation of Jane Austen's Pride and Prejudice, starring Colin Firth and Jennifer Ehle. Contemporary social drama, a BBC signature style since the 1960s, remained in the form of landmark productions such as Our Friends in the North (1996), but it was notable that this was transmitted on the more niche BBC Two channel rather than the mainstream BBC One as might well have been the case in previous decades.

There was criticism of the department's commissioning process in some quarters, which was seen as being overly intricate and bureaucratic. As The Independent described: "Lengthy agonising over whether the BBC1 saga Seaforth would be given a second series (eventually, it wasn't) further encouraged the view that the BBC's management floor is full of desks where the buck does not so much stop as hang around for a few months." Further problems emerged for the drama department after the departure of Charles Denton as its Head in May 1996. He was briefly replaced on a temporary basis by Ruth Caleb, the Head of Drama at BBC Wales. However, Caleb had no interest in taking the job on a permanent basis, and after a six-month attachment left the post at the end of the year. With no suitable candidate to take the job on a full-time basis having been found, Director of Television Alan Yentob was forced to oversee the department, again on a temporary basis.

There was much criticism in the press over the inability of the BBC to find a full-time Head of Drama, with even the BBC Chairman Sir Christopher Bland criticising the amount of time it was taking to find a new Head of Department, stating publicly that: "There aren't a lot of people who are pre-eminently qualified and able to do the biggest job in drama. That's the difficulty.". Experienced BBC Drama staff such as Michael Wearing (Head of Serials) were leaving the department, which was seen to be in trouble after the failure of hugely expensive productions such as the historical drama Rhodes in 1996. "Many in the drama business, and not just BBC insiders, are worried about the hand-over of creative say to the controllers, low morale and the lack of a head," The Guardian reported in December 1996. Finally in June 1997 Colin Adams was appointed as the new Head of Drama. Adams was a surprising choice, his previous role at the Corporation having been as Head of Northern Broadcasting. However, he was essentially an administrator and seen by Drama staff as a temporary appointment.

In 1997 the BBC approached Mal Young, best known for producing Liverpool-set Channel 4 soap Brookside, to head up the Drama Series section of the in-house Drama Department, which had become something of a poisoned chalice with many Controllers departing in quick succession. As Controller of Continuing Drama Series, Young oversaw the move to volume production and also commissioned a new medical Series, Holby City. By the time Young left the BBC to join 19 Television Limited as head of Drama in December 2004, the BBC had increased Series production to nearly 300 hours per annum, including EastEnders at four times a week, Holby City for 52 episodes, Casualty for 48 episodes. Volume Series production was a controversial move because it took a large part of the Drama budget away from original production and contributed to accusations of "dumbing down" its programming. "The decision to show EastEnders four nights a week, followed by Holby City has left the corporation open to accusations that the BBC1 schedule has been cleared for a diet of 'precinct pulp'," reported The Guardian in 2003.

== The modern era ==
As of 2010, the current Commissioner of Drama at the BBC is Ben Stephenson. Working with Stephenson are: Head of Series & Serials Kate Harwood and Controller of Continuing (i.e. year-round) Drama Series John Yorke (who also acts as Head of Drama for the BBC's in-house production arm), with David M. Thompson of Film & Single Drama overseeing one-offs. Sarah Brandist and Polly Hill are the commissioning editors for independently produced drama programming.

Having been Head of Serials from 1997 to 2000, Jane Tranter was made Head of Drama in 2000. Tranter's era from 2000–06 saw a return to longer-run episode series, with programmes such as Spooks being given longer second runs following successful debut seasons. Recent years have also seen a huge increase in continuing drama output, with EastEnders gaining a fourth weekly episode to add to the third added during the mid-1990s, and Casualty and its spin-off series Holby City (1999–present) turning from regular seasonal shows to year-round soap opera-style productions. These moves have been criticised in some quarters for filling the market with insubstantial populist dramas at the expense of 'quality' prestige pieces, although there have been several notable drama serial successes, such as Paul Abbott's State of Play (2003) and the historical drama Charles II: The Power and The Passion (BBC Northern Ireland - 2004).

Another move of recent years has been the regionalisation of BBC drama, in response to criticisms that the majority of programmes were made and set in and around London and the surrounding areas, with the BBC's central drama department currently being based at Television Centre in West London. As far back at 1962, the makers of Z-Cars had deliberately set their programme near Liverpool in the North of England to break away from the perceived London bias (although, ironically, it was shot in the BBC's London studios), and in 1971 an English Regions Drama Department had been established at BBC Birmingham headed by David Rose with a remit for making 'regional drama', gaining a major success with Alan Bleasdale's Boys from the Blackstuff in 1982. In the modern era, however, the separate BBC branches in Scotland, Wales and Northern Ireland all have their own drama departments with Heads of Drama who have autonomous commissioning powers, both for in-house production and co-production with or commissioning from independents.

Although some of these shows are purely for regional consumption, such as BBC Scotland's River City and BBC Wales' Belonging, many programmes networked nationally on BBC One and Two are made in 'the nations', with perhaps the highest profile being the current BBC Wales revival of Doctor Who. The larger English regions also produce drama productions of their own, with BBC Birmingham providing the detective drama Dalziel and Pascoe, daytime soap opera Doctors and anthology series The Afternoon Play for national consumption, for example.

From 1999 until 2006, the BBC also had a new in-house drama division, BBC Fictionlab, headed up by Richard Fell, which specialised in producing dramas for the corporation's digital stations, particularly BBC Four. Notable Fictionlab productions for BBC Four included The Alan Clark Diaries (2003), a live re-make of The Quatermass Experiment (2005) and the biopic Kenneth Tynan - In Praise of Hardcore (2005). Several of these have later seen analogue transmission on BBC Two. However, in January 2006 the BBC announced that Fictionlab was to be disbanded, as the digital channels were now well established and no longer needed a specialised drama production unit.

In the 2010s, BBC drama costs up to £1 million per hour for "premium" dramas by independent production companies.

== Children's drama ==
The BBC has established a strong reputation in the field of children's drama, although children's dramas are almost universally commissioned and / or produced by the BBC's Children's Department rather than the Drama Department itself. There are however occasional crossovers - Doctor Who, for example, would commonly be regarded as a children's or family programme, but has always been produced by the main Drama Department.

Throughout much of the department's history, the emphasis has been on continuing productions of short-run drama serials, including adaptations of classic children's literature such as Little Lord Fauntleroy, as well as made-for-television productions. Science-fiction has been a popular theme, from Stranger from Space (1951–52) through to the likes of Dark Season (1991) and Century Falls (1993). Since the middle of the 1980s, children's dramas - with the exception of the Sunday evening 'classics' slot - have almost always been screened in the weekday BBC One 3pm-5.30pm Children's BBC (CBBC) strand.

Longer continuing drama series became common from the late 1970s, spearheaded by the 1978 launch of the popular school-set drama series Grange Hill. Created by Liverpudlian dramatist Phil Redmond, the intention of the programme was to present issues relevant to children in a realistic manner, showing characters in a modern Comprehensive school and concentrating on the issues facing children in such schools. The series was a huge success, and in 1989 a similar programme, Byker Grove, set in a youth club, was launched by the BBC's North-Eastern arm and screened on Children's BBC.

From the 1990s onwards, in common with BBC programming in other genres, children's drama has often been commissioned from independent producers as well as being made in-house. Grange Hill switched to independent production after twenty-five years as an in-house programme in 2003, when production was taken over by Mersey Television, the company established by the programme's creator Phil Redmond in the early 1980s. Co-productions with foreign broadcasters are also common, with BBC Scotland's successful 2004 fantasy drama Shoebox Zoo being made in collaboration with the Canadian company Blueprint Entertainment.

As of 2005, the BBC continues to broadcast children's drama, usually in the weekday afternoon CBBC slot, but also occasional Sunday early evening / late afternoon prestige productions such as the adaptation of Kidnapped (April 2005).

== See also ==
- Broadcasting
- Timeline of the BBC
- List of television programmes broadcast by the BBC
- Television play
- Radio drama
