= The Girl in the Café =

2005 television film directed by David Yates

- Genre: Drama
- Written by: Richard Curtis
- Directed by: David Yates
- Starring: Bill Nighy; Kelly Macdonald; Marit Velle Kile
- Music by: Nicholas Hooper
- Countries of origin: United Kingdom; United States
- Original languages: English; French

Production
- Executive producers: Robert Velo; Paul Abbott; Richard Curtis; Julie Gardner
- Producer: Hilary Bevan Jones
- Cinematography: Chris Seager
- Editor: Mark Day
- Running time: 90 minutes
- Production companies: BBC Wales; Tightrope Pictures; HBO Films

Original release
- Network: BBC One; HBO
- Release: 25 June 2005

The Girl in the Café is a British made-for-television drama film directed by David Yates, written by Richard Curtis and produced by Hilary Bevan Jones. The film is produced by the independent production company Tightrope Pictures and was originally screened on BBC One in the United Kingdom on 25 June 2005. It was also shown in the United States on HBO on the same day. Bill Nighy portrays the character of Lawrence, with Kelly Macdonald portraying Gina. Nighy and Macdonald had previously starred together in the 2003 BBC serial State of Play, which was also directed by Yates and produced by Bevan-Jones. The Girl in the Café's casting director is Fiona Weir who, at the time, was also the casting director for the Harry Potter films, the last four of which Yates directed.

The film received seven nominations at the 58th Primetime Emmy Awards, where it won Outstanding Made for Television Movie, Outstanding Writing for a Miniseries, Movie or a Dramatic Special for Curtis, and Outstanding Supporting Actress in a Miniseries or a Movie for Macdonald.

== Overview ==
Lawrence (Bill Nighy), a civil servant working for the chancellor of the exchequer (Ken Stott), falls in love with Gina (Kelly Macdonald), a young woman he meets by chance in a London café. Lawrence takes Gina to a G8 summit in Reykjavík, Iceland, where she confronts the prime minister of the United Kingdom (Corin Redgrave) over the issue of third world debt and poverty in Africa, much to Lawrence's embarrassment and the anger of his employers. However, he realises that she is right and tries to help persuade the Chancellor and others at the summit to do something about the issues concerned.

== Cast ==
- Bill Nighy as Lawrence
- Kelly Macdonald as Gina
- Ken Stott as Chancellor of the Exchequer
- Corin Redgrave as Prime Minister of the United Kingdom

== Production ==
The production was conceived to tie-in both with the BBC's Africa Lives season of programming, and with the global Make Poverty History campaign, for which writer Curtis was a prominent campaigner. As such, it was also shown in South Africa on the same day as its UK and US premieres. Curtis was better-known as a writer of romantic comedy films such as Four Weddings and a Funeral, Notting Hill and Love Actually (the latter of which he also directed and had featured Nighy). Although The Girl in the Café does contain some of his trademark comedy elements, it is generally more serious in tone and attempts to highlight the issues of poverty and fair trade.

== Reception ==
On BBC One, the programme gained an audience of 5.5 million, a 29% share of the total television audience watching over its 90-minute duration, winning its timeslot. The opinions, however, were divided.

Andrew Anthony, for example, wrote a negative review in The Observer:

No one among a first rate cast seemed sure if they were in a lightweight film with a heavyweight theme or a heavyweight film with lightly drawn characters. The tone was strangely solemn and the atmosphere cold, as though the film-makers had done a crash course in serious European cinema and decided that the key to its success was stilted conversation... There will be those who will argue that the normal critical judgments ought not to apply when the cause is so worthy. But drama is no more exempt from protest than economics.

Sarah Vine, herself the wife of a conservative politician, argued in The Times that the message was devalued by an oversimplification of the problem. In her opinion the film's main weakness is the belief that the G8 leaders can simply end poverty.

The Girl in the Café had one unforgivable and entirely avoidable flaw: oversimplification. Presenting a complex issue in such a one-dimensional way is not only patronizing, it also devalues the message. Michael Moore-ism has its place in this world but not on the BBC and not at the taxpayer's expense.[...] It is deeply wrong that 30,000 children should die each day because of poverty. But it is equally wrong to suggest that eight men in a room, however deep their pockets or willing their hearts, can simply wave a magic wand and make it all go away.

However, the film gained positive reviews too with Alessandra Stanley from The New York Times stating:

The film may seem preachy and quixotic but actually celebrity finger-pointing seems to work. The film tries to humanize a vast, complex problem, not through the African victims but through pampered Western protagonists who lack the courage of their convictions. That approach is not consistent with the structure of the film. It doesn't matter. The awkward romance is compelling, mostly because Mr. Nighy is so good.

There were also more positive reactions. Previewing the programme before transmission, Sarah Crompton was very enthusiastic when writing for The Daily Telegraph:

Though I am convinced by the need to take radical action against extreme poverty, I recognize that others are doubtful. But what I find so moving about The Girl in the Café... is its absolute belief in the power of drama to transform thinking.

== Accolades ==
Year	Award	Category	Nominee(s)	Result	Ref.
2005	Online Film & Television Association Awards	Best Motion Picture Made for Television		Nominated	
2005	Online Film & Television Association Awards	Best Actress in a Motion Picture or Miniseries	Kelly Macdonald	Nominated	
2005	Online Film & Television Association Awards	Best Writing of a Motion Picture or Miniseries	Richard Curtis	Nominated	
2005	Royal Television Society Awards	Sound – Drama	Simon Okin, Stuart Hilliker, Jamie McPhee, and Pat Boxhall	Nominated	
2006	AARP Movies for Grownups Awards	Best TV Movie		Won	
2006	British Academy Television Craft Awards	Best Original Television Music	Nicholas Hooper	Nominated	
2006	British Academy Television Craft Awards	Best Photography and Lighting – Fiction/Entertainment	Chris Seager	Won	
2006	Golden Globe Awards	Best Actor – Miniseries or Television Film	Bill Nighy	Nominated	
2006	Golden Globe Awards	Best Actress – Miniseries or Television Film	Kelly Macdonald	Nominated	
2006	Humanitas Prize	90 Minute or Longer Network or Syndicated Television	Richard Curtis	Won	
2006	Primetime Emmy Awards	Outstanding Made for Television Movie	Paul Abbott, Hilary Bevan Jones, and Richard Curtis	Won	
2006	Primetime Emmy Awards	Outstanding Supporting Actress in a Miniseries or a Movie	Kelly Macdonald	Won	
2006	Primetime Emmy Awards	Outstanding Directing for a Miniseries, Movie or a Dramatic Special	David Yates	Nominated	
2006	Primetime Emmy Awards	Outstanding Writing for a Miniseries, Movie or a Dramatic Special	Richard Curtis	Won	
2006	Primetime Emmy Awards	Outstanding Art Direction for a Miniseries or Movie	Andrea Coathupe and Candida Otton	Nominated	
2006	Primetime Emmy Awards	Outstanding Casting for a Miniseries, Movie or a Special	Fiona Weir	Nominated	
2006	Primetime Emmy Awards	Outstanding Single-Camera Picture Editing for a Miniseries or a Movie	Mark Day	Nominated	
