= Jane Tranter =

English television executive (born 1962)

Jane Tranter CBE
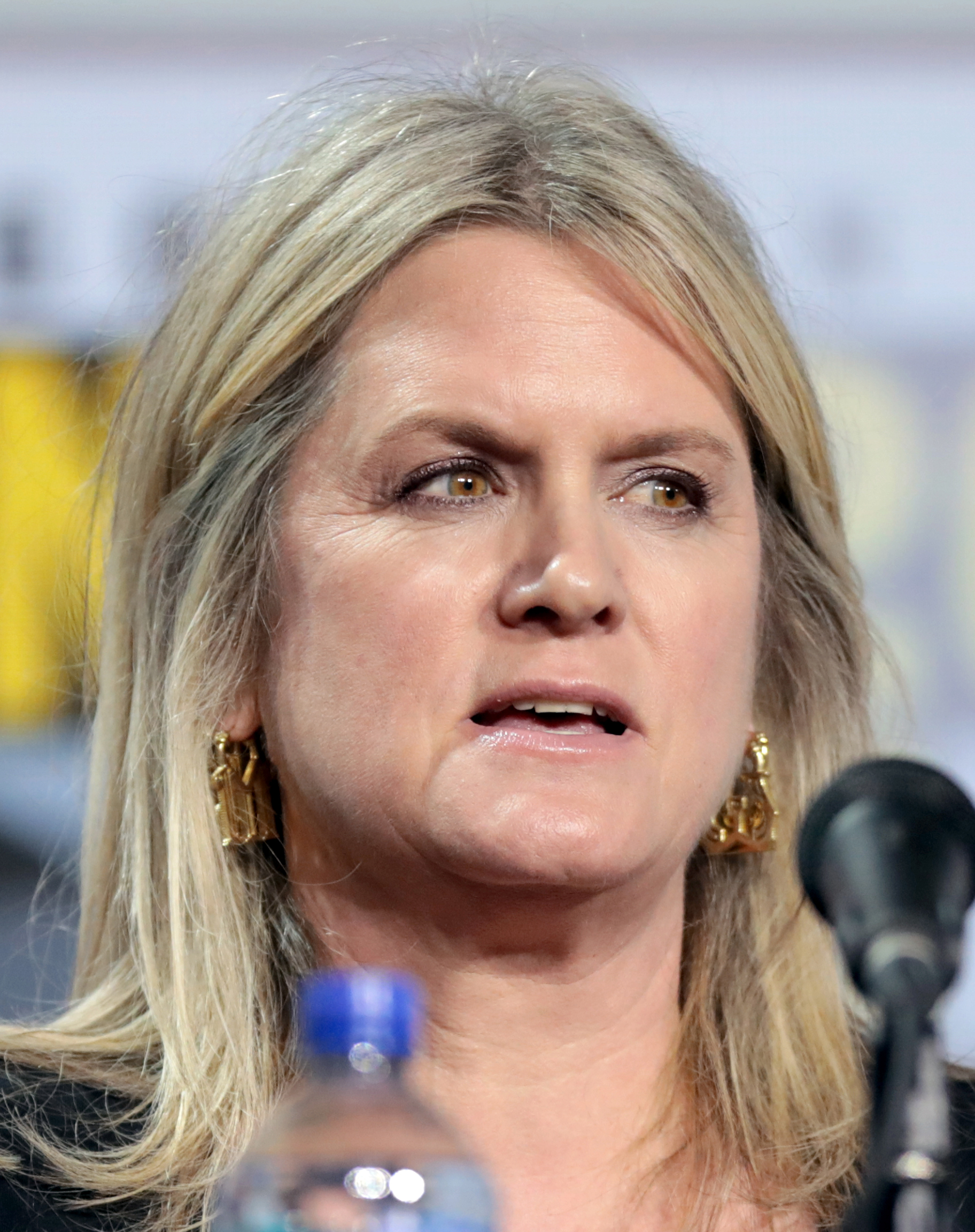
- Tranter in 2019
- Born: Pauline Jane Tranter; 17 March 1963 (age 63); Oxford, England
- Education: King's College London
- Years active: 1985–present
- Title: Co-founder and CEO of Bad Wolf
- Spouse: David Attwood (m. 1997; died 2024)

Pauline Jane Tranter CBE (born 17 March 1963) is an English television executive who was the executive vice-president of programming and production at BBC Worldwide's Los Angeles base from 2009 until 2015. From 2006 to 2008, she was the BBC's controller of fiction; in this capacity she oversaw the corporation's output in drama and comedy, as well as films and programmes acquired from overseas, across all BBC TV channels. Critics were concerned that the BBC had invested too much creative power in one person, and following Tranter's move to the United States, the position of controller of fiction was abolished and the responsibilities divided up among four other executives.

== Personal life ==
Tranter was appointed Commander of the Order of the British Empire (CBE) in the 2025 Birthday Honours.

== Early career ==
After studying English Literature at King's College London and taking a secretarial course back in Oxford, she joined the staff of the BBC in 1985, initially working as a secretary in the radio drama department. Two years later, she made the switch into television, working as a floor manager on dramas such as EastEnders and Bergerac.

Later that same year she was promoted to assistant script editor, working on the BBC's popular medical drama Casualty. She quickly caught the eye of producer David M. Thompson, who promoted her to act as script editor on the anthology drama series Screen One and Screen Two, essentially the same programme whose title changed depending on whether it was being screened on BBC One or BBC Two, with the transmission channel varying depending on content and tone of the dramas produced.

In 1992, she left the staff of the BBC to take up a position as a drama script editor at Carlton Television, working for Tracy Hofman, the controller of drama. Carlton had won the ITV network franchise for broadcasting in London on weekdays, and planned to produce dramas for national consumption across the entire network. At Carlton, Tranter oversaw the Timothy Spall comedy-drama Frank Stubbs Promotes and the Victorian-era medical drama Bramwell, both of which were hits for ITV.

She returned to the BBC in 1997, initially as an executive producer in the Film & Single Drama department and in 1999 she became Head of Drama Serials. In these roles she commissioned and oversaw a range of dramas made or co-produced by the BBC's own drama department, from playwright Arthur Smith's football-based comedy-drama My Summer With Des (1998) to gritty contemporary dramas such as Warriors (1999, starring Matthew Macfadyen) and traditional BBC literary adaptations in the vein of David Copperfield (also 1999).

== BBC executive ==
In 2000, she was promoted to Controller of Drama Commissioning at the BBC, where she was ultimately responsible for overseeing the corporation's entire drama output across all channels, from the in-house departments and independent companies, in series, serials and one-offs. During her tenure in charge of the drama department, the BBC screened ratings-grabbing popular dramas such as Spooks (BBC One, 2002–2011) and Waking the Dead (BBC One, 2000–2011), as well as award-winning productions such as Paul Abbott's State of Play (2003) and the adaptation of Charles Dickens' novel Bleak House (2005). She also oversaw the transformation of popular dramas Casualty and its spin-off Holby City into year-round dramas, the addition of a fourth weekly episode to soap opera EastEnders and the highly successful resurrection of classic science-fiction series Doctor Who in 2005.

In 2003, she was responsible for a programming budget in the region of £324 million, and in 2002 alone was ultimately responsible for 473 hours of television.

In September 2006, Tranter was promoted to the newly created Head of Fiction position at the BBC. This made her responsible not only for drama, but for comedy, films and acquired programmes from overseas. In this new position, Tranter had an almost unprecedented amount of control over scripted drama on the BBC.

== BBC Worldwide ==
Throughout 2008, there was media speculation that Tranter would be leaving the BBC to take up a position as head of BBC Worldwide's American arm. Despite denying the claims at a Royal Television Society event in June, her new role in the US was confirmed in September. She began her new job as executive vice-president of programming and production at BBC Worldwide's Los Angeles base on 1 January 2009. The BBC had been criticised for consolidating the control of fiction commissioning in one person; following Tranter's resignation, the responsibilities were split between four BBC executives.

During her tenure, she was responsible for the Bravo reality television series Ladies of London.

== Bad Wolf ==
In the summer of 2015, Tranter set up a production company with Julie Gardner based in Cardiff, Wales and Los Angeles, California. The company was named Bad Wolf in homage to a Doctor Who storyline. Bad Wolf's first production, The Night Of, was nominated for thirteen Emmys in 2017, of which it won five. The company has since gone on to produce shows like His Dark Materials and A Discovery of Witches. She, along with Julie Gardner, returned to Doctor Who when Russell T Davies returned as showrunner in 2023, with Bad Wolf taking over the series production.

Tranter continues to work as a producer outside of Bad Wolf. She was an executive producer on the HBO hit Succession, which was awarded a Peabody in 2019. In 2020, Succession received both a Golden Globe and an Emmy - Best Drama Series and Outstanding Drama Series respectively.

In 2021, Radio Times listed Tranter at No. 16 in their TV 100 list for 2020.

Media offices
| Preceded by Colin Adams | BBC Television Controller of Drama Commissioning; 2000–2006 | Succeeded by Julie Gardner |
