= List of Cracker episodes =

Cracker is a British crime drama series, created and principally written by Jimmy McGovern, and starring Robbie Coltrane and Geraldine Somerville. A total of three series and two specials were broadcast over the course of thirteen years. Episodes varied in length from 50 minutes (series one-three) to 120 minutes (specials). The original broadcast of episode one of the "Brotherly Love" story was an hour long, a total of 70 minutes with commercials, and shown on the Sunday before the regular Monday slot for the series. Further broadcasts of this episode, including VHS and DVD release, were edited down to the conventional 50 minute size.

== Series overview ==
Series	Episodes	Originally released	
Series	Episodes	First released	Last released
1	7	27 September 1993	8 November 1993
2	9	10 October 1994	5 December 1994
3	7	22 October 1995	27 November 1995
Special		28 October 1996	
Special		1 October 2006	

== Episodes ==
=== Series 1 (1993) ===
No. overall	No. in series	Title	Directed by	Written by	Original release date
1	1	"The Mad Woman in the Attic (Part One)"	Michael Winterbottom	Jimmy McGovern	27 September 1993
After a young woman is found dead on a train, slashed to death with a straight razor, criminal psychologist Dr Edward "Fitz" Fitzgerald is hired by DCI Bilborough to help in the investigation. The prime suspect, Thomas Francis Kelly, however, claims to have amnesia, despite Fitz's attempts to crack him.
2	2	"The Mad Woman in the Attic (Part Two)"	Michael Winterbottom	Jimmy McGovern	4 October 1993
While Kelly continues to have no recollection about the murder, Fitz takes him into his custody and begins to believe in his innocence when a man claiming to be Kelly's priest commits the sin of confirming that Kelly confessed his guilt a while ago.
3	3	"To Say I Love You (Part One)"	Andy Wilson	Jimmy McGovern	11 October 1993
Fitz is drawn into a Bonnie and Clyde story when two young social outcasts, the mentally unstable Sean Kerrigan and the insecure Tina O'Brien, find each other and go on a crime spree.
4	4	"To Say I Love You (Part Two)"	Andy Wilson	Jimmy McGovern	18 October 1993
DS Giggs is killed by Sean and Tina, who send the police a video of their intentions beforehand. Fitz recognises Sean from a previous encounter and lures them out. Tina accosts Fitz at a bar with the intention of murdering him, but she is caught and arrested, while Sean flees.
5	5	"To Say I Love You (Part Three)"	Andy Wilson	Jimmy McGovern	25 October 1993
With the police closing in on him, Sean targets Tina's family in revenge for Tina's harsh upbringing, while Fitz pleads with Tina to cooperate with them before Sean goes too far.
6	6	"One Day a Lemming Will Fly (Part One)"	Simon Cellan Jones	Jimmy McGovern	1 November 1993
A young boy, Timothy Lang, is found hanged in a nearby wood, drawing the ire of the city, and the main suspect is Tim's school teacher, Mr Cassidy.
7	7	"One Day a Lemming Will Fly (Part Two)"	Simon Cellan Jones	Jimmy McGovern	8 November 1993
Cassidy is arrested but set free because of lack of evidence. After he is almost killed by Timothy's father, he is placed in the custody of Fitz, who pressures Cassidy to confess. Cassidy then reveals he is innocent, but refuses to retract his confession so Fitz will share his guilt.

=== Series 2 (1994) ===
No. overall	No. in series	Title	Directed by	Written by	Original release date
8	1	"To Be a Somebody (Part One)"	Tim Fywell	Jimmy McGovern	10 October 1994
Albert "Albie" Kinsella Jr., a divorced and bitter manual worker, murders a Pakistani shopkeeper – the police, and Fitz, must find out why.
9	2	"To Be a Somebody (Part Two)"	Tim Fywell	Jimmy McGovern	17 October 1994
Re-hiring Fitz, the police become convinced that they are not dealing with a hood, but an ordinary citizen gone horribly wrong. As they investigate Albie's neighbourhood, Albie feigns cancer and fools DS Beck, with dire consequences when Albie lures Bilborough into a trap and stabs him to death. In his final moments, Bilborough identifies Albie to his comrades.
10	3	"To Be a Somebody (Part Three)"	Tim Fywell	Jimmy McGovern	24 October 1994
Bilborough is replaced by DCI Charlie Wise, who takes over the investigation. As the police close in on him, Albie reveals a few explosive tricks to carry out his revenge for Hillsborough.
11	4	"The Big Crunch (Part One)"	Julian Jarrold	Ted Whitehead	31 October 1994
A young girl missing for several days is discovered naked, covered in strange symbols and quoting the Bible. The trail leads to a fringe Christian sect and its charismatic leader, Kenneth Trant.
12	5	"The Big Crunch (Part Two)"	Julian Jarrold	Ted Whitehead	7 November 1994
The police track down and arrest one of Trant's apparently learning-disabled workers after the girl dies in the hospital. Fitz cracks him and discovers his innocence, but he hangs himself out of guilt.
13	6	"The Big Crunch (Part Three)"	Julian Jarrold	Ted Whitehead	14 November 1994
As Fitz begins an affair with DS Jane Penhaligon, he makes it his mission to crack Trant and his obedient family into admitting their guilt in murdering the young girl, while learning it will not be as easy as it seems.
14	7	"Men Should Weep (Part One)"	Jean Stewart	Jimmy McGovern	21 November 1994
Floyd Malcolm, a black taxi driver, lashes out at white men who disrespect him by raping their wives and destroying the evidence, and strikes at the heart of Fitz's personal life when Penhaligon is raped.
15	8	"Men Should Weep (Part Two)"	Jean Stewart	Jimmy McGovern	28 November 1994
Convinced that Penhaligon was raped by somebody else, the police begin closing in on Floyd, while Penhaligon discovers a connection between her rapist and DS Jimmy Beck. Acting apparently on Fitz's advice, Floyd murders his next victim.
16	9	"Men Should Weep (Part Three)"	Jean Stewart	Jimmy McGovern	5 December 1994
Floyd is captured, but his lawyer secures his release before he can confess, and he plans his revenge against Fitz while Penhaligon takes matters into her own hands with Beck.

=== Series 3 (1995) ===
No. overall	No. in series	Title	Directed by	Written by	Original release date
17	1	"Brotherly Love (Part One)"	Roy Battersby	Jimmy McGovern	22 October 1995
The brutal murder and violation of a prostitute quickly lead the police to arrest David Harvey, while the death of Fitz's mother reunites him with his estranged brother, Danny. After four months of mental therapy, DS Beck returns to the force, to Penhaligon's discomfort.
18	2	"Brotherly Love (Part Two)"	Roy Battersby	Jimmy McGovern	23 October 1995
After another prostitute is killed in an identical manner, the police tail and arrest David Harvey's brother, Father Michael. Though he is released due to lack of evidence, Michael casts his suspicion on David's wife, Maggie, who claims Michael killed one of her children.
19	3	"Brotherly Love (Part Three)"	Roy Battersby	Jimmy McGovern	30 October 1995
Beck breaks down and admits to Fitz that he did rape Penhaligon, but makes Fitz swear to keep it secret. Fitz realises Maggie is the second killer and she is arrested before she can kill another prostitute. She confesses to her crimes which were revenge against the prostitutes David was sleeping with, costing them the money which would have raised their fifth child which Michael, who was aware of David's activities, convinced Maggie to abort, hence why Maggie holds him responsible for his death. Maggie also falsely confesses to the murder of the first prostitute to secure David's release, which drives Beck to his breaking point and leads to a devastating climax.
20	4	"Best Boys (Part One)"	Charles McDougall	Paul Abbott	6 November 1995
When the older Stuart Grady meets the teenage Bill Nash, the instant attraction between the two leads to murderous consequences. Meanwhile, the birth of Fitz's new son is not the solution to his marital strife that he expected, and Judith begins to seek solace with Danny.
21	5	"Best Boys (Part Two)"	Charles McDougall	Paul Abbott	13 November 1995
An accident leads the police to apprehend Grady while Nash is still at large. As the police close in on him, Nash targets his former foster family, particularly their little boy.
22	6	"True Romance (Part One)"	Tim Fywell	Paul Abbott	20 November 1995
Fitz becomes the target of a secret admirer who is willing to kill – and keep killing – to get his attention, understanding and love.
23	7	"True Romance (Part Two)"	Tim Fywell	Paul Abbott	27 November 1995
Fitz's personal life is thrown into disarray when his admirer targets his son, Mark.

=== Special (1996) ===
No. overall	Title	Directed by	Written by	Original release date
24	"White Ghost" "Lucky White Ghost"	Richard Standeven	Paul Abbott	28 October 1996
While in Hong Kong on a lecture tour, Fitz is asked by the local police to help investigate the murder of a Chinese businessman.

=== Special (2006) ===
No. overall	Title	Directed by	Written by	Original release date	UK viewers (millions)
25	"Nine Eleven" "A New Terror"	Antonia Bird	Jimmy McGovern	1 October 2006	8.83
After living in Australia for seven years, Fitz returns to Manchester for his daughter's wedding, but is soon involved in another murder investigation when an American comedian is killed, apparently without motive.
