= Cracker (British TV series) =

British television crime drama series (1993–2006)

- Created by: Jimmy McGovern
- Starring: Robbie Coltrane; Geraldine Somerville; Christopher Eccleston; Ricky Tomlinson; Lorcan Cranitch; Barbara Flynn; Kieran O'Brien
- Country of origin: United Kingdom
- Original language: English
- No. of series: 3 (+ 2 specials)
- No. of episodes: 25 (list of episodes)

Production
- Executive producer: Sally Head
- Producers: Gub Neal; Paul Abbott; Hilary Bevan Jones; John Chapman
- Production locations: Manchester, England
- Running time: 50 mins. (Series 1–3); 120 mins. (Specials)
- Production company: Granada Television

Original release
- Network: ITV
- Release: 27 September 1993 – 1 October 2006

Cracker is a British crime drama series produced by Granada Television for ITV, created and principally written by Jimmy McGovern. Set in Manchester, the series follows a criminal psychologist (or "cracker"), Dr Edward "Fitz" Fitzgerald, played by Robbie Coltrane, who works with the Greater Manchester Police (GMP) to help them solve crimes.

The show consists of three series, originally broadcast from 1993 to 1995. A 100-minute special set in Hong Kong followed in 1996 and another two-hour story in 2006. The show won the British Academy Television Award for Best Drama Series in 1995 and 1996, and Coltrane received the British Academy Television Award for Best Actor in three consecutive years (1994 to 1996).

== Overview ==
Fitz is Scottish of Irish origin, alcoholic, a chain smoker, obese, sedentary, addicted to gambling, manic, foul-mouthed and sarcastic, yet cerebral and brilliant. He is a genius in his speciality: criminal psychology. As Fitz confesses in "Brotherly Love": "I drink too much, I smoke too much, I gamble too much. I am too much."

Each case spanned several episodes and cliffhangers were quite often used, but it was not until the end of the second series that a cliffhanger was employed to tie off the series. Some of the plotlines in the cases took as their starting point real events such as the Hillsborough disaster, whilst others were purely fictional with only tangential ties to actual events.

Several different psychotic types were explored during the run of the show with increasingly complex psychological motivations that, as the series entered the middle of the second series, began to expand beyond the criminals being investigated to the regular cast members. As the series moved forward, the storylines became as much about the interactions of the regulars as they were about the crimes. In many later episodes the crimes often became background to intense, provocative explorations of the police officers' reactions to the crimes they investigated.

To emphasise how fine a line the police (and Fitz) walk in their close association with criminals, all three series featured several stories in which the police become victims of crime or themselves commit criminal acts such as murder, rape, obstruction of justice and assault and battery.

== Characters ==
=== Main cast ===
- Robbie Coltrane as Dr Edward "Fitz" Fitzgerald. The character was named after the English poet and writer Edward FitzGerald, according to series creator Jimmy McGovern. Coltrane won three consecutive BAFTA awards for the role, a streak matched only by Michael Gambon, Helen Mirren and Julie Walters.
- Christopher Eccleston as DCI David Billborough (series 1–2)
- Ricky Tomlinson as DCI Charlie Wise (series 2–3)
- Geraldine Somerville as DS Jane "Panhandle" Penhaligon
- Lorcan Cranitch as DS Jimmy Beck
- Barbara Flynn as Judith Fitzgerald
- Kieran O'Brien as Mark Fitzgerald
- Tess Thomson as Katy Fitzgerald
- Edward Peel as the Chief Super
- Paul Copley as the Pathologist
- Amelia Bullmore (series 1) and Isobel Middleton (series 2–3) as Catriona Bilborough
- Ian Mercer as DS George Giggs (series 1)
- Stan Finni as Sgt. Smith (series 1)
- Colin Tierney as DC Bobby Harriman (series 2)
- Wil Johnson as PC/DC Michael Skelton (series 2–3)
- Robert Cavanah as DC Alan Temple (series 3)
- Clive Russell as Danny Fitzgerald (series 3); Russell was cast at Coltrane's recommendation.

=== Notable guest stars ===
Several well-known actors appeared over the course of the series, including Adrian Dunbar, Jim Carter, Maureen O'Brien, James Fleet, David Bradley, John Simm, Liam Cunningham, Robert Carlyle, Samantha Morton, Bríd Brennan, John McArdle, Tim Healy, Geoffrey Hutchings, David Calder, Paul Barber and David Haig. Beryl Reid made her penultimate screen appearance in the first series, with a cameo as Fitz's mother.

== Episodes ==
Series	Episodes	Originally released	
Series	Episodes	First released	Last released
1	7	27 September 1993	8 November 1993
2	9	10 October 1994	5 December 1994
3	7	22 October 1995	27 November 1995
Special		28 October 1996	
Special		1 October 2006	

== Production ==
The first two series were written by Jimmy McGovern, excepting the fifth serial, "The Big Crunch", which was contributed by Ted Whitehead. Claiming that he had "nothing more to write about”, McGovern originally planned to leave after the second series but was allowed to write the controversial rape storyline, "Men Should Weep", when he agreed to contribute a three-part story to the third series. Two of McGovern's stories, "To Say I Love You" and "Brotherly Love" (from the first and third series respectively), received Edgar Awards from the Mystery Writers of America. Each serial had a different director, with the exceptions of "To Be a Somebody" and "True Romance", both directed by Tim Fywell.

Paul Abbott, who had produced the second series, wrote the remainder of the episodes (including the feature-length special "White Ghost"). Abbott later went on to create several high-profile dramas, including Touching Evil (1997), State of Play (2003) and Shameless (2004). Another crew member, Nicola Shindler, who worked as script editor on the programme, later went on to found Red Production Company.

Of the regular cast, only Coltrane and Tomlinson featured in "White Ghost" (retitled "Lucky White Ghost" for some overseas markets), which was set in Hong Kong. Although the series was still drawing large audiences after White Ghost, Coltrane declined to return as Fitz unless McGovern returned to write the series.

Cracker returned a decade after "White Ghost" in the 2006 special episode, "Nine Eleven", written by McGovern and directed by Antonia Bird. Coltrane, Flynn and O'Brien were the only actors to return in their previous roles. The new roles of DCI Walters, DS Saleh and DS McAllister were played by Richard Coyle, Nisha Nayar and Rafe Spall respectively. The story involved Fitz returning to Manchester after several years of living in Australia with Judith and his son James (who had been born during the third series) to attend his daughter Katy's wedding. The murder of an American nightclub comedian sends the police to ask Fitz for his help.

=== Locations ===
The series was principally filmed in south Manchester, at locations including Didsbury (where Fitz lived at the fictitious address of "15 Charlotte Road") and the police station at Longsight. The internals for the police station were filmed in the old Daily Mirror offices in central Manchester, now The Printworks retail complex. Other Manchester locations included Victoria Railway Station, St Peter's Square, Old Trafford, the Arndale Centre, UMIST, University of Salford, the Ramada Hotel, The Star and Garter (interior and exterior for the "Best Boys" episode) and the Safeway supermarket (now Morrisons) in Chorlton-cum-Hardy. The Hulme Crescents were also used for filming in the first two episodes of series one and the first episode of series two; during which time they were being demolished. The first episode involved several railway scenes which were filmed on the East Lancashire Railway in Bury (north Manchester) both on the trackside and inside the Carriage & Wagon Works, where working volunteers from the railway used crowbars to push the carriage springs up and down to suggest a moving train, while water was poured on the windows to suggest rain between black polythene sheets and the window to indicate darkness.

== Influences ==
Cracker storylines often begin by showing the crime being committed, a format popularised by Columbo. Both series feature a lead character who solves crimes while masking an intelligent, perceptive nature behind a slobbish exterior, a debt acknowledged by Cracker creator Jimmy McGovern; Fitz delivers his summing-up in "To Say I Love You" while doing a Peter Falk impression.

The series' conception was also partly a reaction against the police procedural approach of fellow Granada crime serial Prime Suspect, placing more emphasis on emotional and psychological truth than on correct police procedure. In an interview with the NME, McGovern dismissed Prime Suspect, noting that "Good TV writing has narrative simplicity and emotional complexity," and characterising the series as "A narratively complex story going up its own arse." Gub Neal, who produced the first series of Cracker, is quoted as saying, "That we had adopted the right approach was confirmed for me when Jacky Malton, the senior woman police officer who advised on Prime Suspect, said that although the way things happened in Cracker was sometimes highly improbable, the relationships between the police were in many ways much more credible than they had been in Prime Suspect."

== Home media ==
In the United States, all three series of Cracker were released through HBO Home Video between 2003 and 2004, with the "White Ghost/Lucky White Ghost" special being included with series three. "A New Terror" and a complete series set were made available from Acorn DVD in 2007 and 2009, respectively.

In the United Kingdom, the series was never made available in the complete individual series forms, but rather in their separate story arcs from each series. All stories that make up the three series and the "White Ghost" special were released from Cinema Club in 2003. All the episodes were re-released, as well as a new release for "A New Terror" (known simply as "Cracker" for the DVD release) and a complete collection set, were made available in 2006 from ITV DVD. The complete series set was re-issued from ITV DVD in 2008.

In Australia, the series was initially released by Shock Records in 2007, who released series one, two and three individually, as well as a set comprising the two specials. The original complete series boxset from Shock contained all series, but excluded the specials, while a re-release of the boxset contained every episode, made available in 2008. Roadshow Entertainment re-released all three series and the two specials individually in 2012. Madman Entertainment acquired distribution rights to the series, and released a complete series boxset in 2024.

Standard sets
Title	Release date		
Title	Region 1	Region 2	Region 4
Series One	14 October 2003	—N/a	23 October 2006; 5 July 2012 (re-issue)
Series Two	24 February 2004	—N/a	15 January 2007; 5 July 2012 (re-issue)
Series Three	20 April 2004	—N/a	2007; 5 September 2012 (re-issue)
The Mad Woman in the Attic	—N/a	12 May 2003; 16 October 2006 (re-issue)	—N/a
To Say I Love You	—N/a	12 May 2003; 16 October 2006 (re-issue)	—N/a
One Day a Lemming Will Fly	—N/a	12 May 2003; 16 October 2006 (re-issue)	—N/a
To Be a Somebody	—N/a	12 May 2003; 16 October 2006 (re-issue)	—N/a
The Big Crunch	—N/a	12 May 2003; 16 October 2006 (re-issue)	—N/a
Men Should Weep	—N/a	12 May 2003; 16 October 2006 (re-issue)	—N/a
Brotherly Love	—N/a	12 May 2003; 16 October 2006 (re-issue)	—N/a
Best Boys	—N/a	12 May 2003; 16 October 2006 (re-issue)	—N/a
True Romance	—N/a	12 May 2003; 16 October 2006 (re-issue)	—N/a
White Ghost (Lucky White Ghost)	(Available with Series 3 DVD)	12 May 2003; 16 October 2006 (re-issue)	2 June 2007 (as one set); 7 November 2012 (as one set, re-issue) (Note: Released as "Series Four & Five" for Australian re-issue.)
Nine Eleven (A New Terror) (Note: Simply released as "Cracker" in the UK.)	28 August 2007	9 October 2006	2 June 2007 (as one set); 7 November 2012 (as one set, re-issue)

Collection sets
Title	Release date		
Title	Region 1	Region 2	Region 4
The Complete Collection (10-disc set)	10 March 2009	—N/a	—N/a
The Complete Collection (11-disc set)	—N/a	16 October 2006	—N/a
The Complete Collection (re-issue) (11-disc set)	—N/a	1 September 2008	—N/a
The Complete Series (7-disc set)	—N/a	—N/a	2 June 2007
Ultimate Collection (9-disc set)	—N/a	—N/a	2 August 2008
The Complete Collection (11-disc set)	—N/a	—N/a	19 June 2024

== Other versions ==
In 1997, a short spoof episode, Prime Cracker, was produced for the BBC's biennial Red Nose Day charity telethon in aid of Comic Relief. A crossover with ITV stablemate crime drama Prime Suspect, the spoof starred Coltrane and Prime Suspect lead Helen Mirren as their characters from the respective series, sending up both shows.

In 1997, a 16-episode U.S. version of Cracker — directed by Stephen Cragg and Michael Fields — was made, starring Robert Pastorelli in Coltrane's role. The original UK story lines were transferred to Los Angeles. The series finished after the first season. It was broadcast in the UK, retitled Fitz.
