= Charles Denton (television and film producer) =

British film and television producer (born 1937)

Charles Denton (born 20 December 1937) is a British film and television producer and executive.

== Early career ==
He first worked for the BBC as a documentary filmmaker for five years from 1963, before he left the corporation to go freelance. Denton formed the short-lived production company Tempest Films with the actor David Swift and fellow documentary maker Richard Marquand which first involved John Pilger in working for television and Pilger's first television documentary The Quiet Mutiny, which Denton directed for Granada's World in Action series.

== ATV, Central and Zenith ==
At ATV he became successively deputy, then Head of Documentaries and later controller of programming. Not long after joining ATV he began the Pilger series which ran for five series between 1974 and 1977. John Pilger recalled: "Pilger was Charles' idea ... It was he who encouraged me to stand in front of the camera and say 'I'."

Denton came under extreme political and diplomatic pressure from both the British and Saudi governments both before and after ATV part-financed and produced the drama-documentary Death of a Princess shown on 9 April 1980. The British ambassador to Saudi Arabia was requested to leave the country, and remained away from his post for several months.

In 1981, he sacked Noele Gordon star of the soap opera Crossroads, a decision which antagonised viewers: "'I got excrement through the post'", he once said. As an act of revenge Gordon sang a 'love song' to him at the ATV End of Year Party. In the 1982 franchise round, the ITV Midlands broadcaster ATV turned into Central Independent Television, with Denton remaining in his post. He is an admirer of his former ATV boss, Lew Grade: "'Those times of meeting Lew in his office at 6.30am and watching him eat his grapefruit were among the happiest working days of my life ... ATV lost its franchise because it was too populist, but Lew would be sensationally right for ITV now.'"

Towards the end of the 1970s, Denton had begun working in the film industry, becoming the managing director of Black Lion Films, also a Grade company. The most notable film he worked on during this time was The Long Good Friday (1980), starring Bob Hoskins, but the film was unappreciated by Denton's superiors, and was sold to HandMade Films becoming their second successful film.

In 1984 Denton left Central to become chief executive of Zenith Productions, which was initially financed by Central as one of its programme-making subsidiaries, and partly intended to become involved in the revival of the British film industry which had resulted from Channel Four's investment in films intended for a brief circuit release before a first television screening as part of its regular Film on 4 seasons. Zenith produced a number of successful feature film including Personal Services and Wish You Were Here. It was sold to Carlton Television in 1989 with Denton remaining in his post.

== Later career ==
In 1993, Carlton sold Zenith and Denton left to re-join the BBC in the role as Head of Drama; by then dramas shot on videotape using the multi-camera technique were largely restricted to soap operas. Denton's time at BBC Drama coincided with some flops, such as the expensive Rhodes (1996) receiving a negative press, but some critical and popular successes such as the adaptation of Pride and Prejudice (1995) with Colin Firth as Mr Darcy.

He left the Head of Drama post in 1996, reportedly in protest at the changes carried through by the Corporation's Director General at the time, John Birt, with Denton complaining of Birt's "'Orwellian'" regime at the BBC. Denton was a member of the Arts Council of England during 1996–1999 and worked for a time for BBC Films. He is a fellow of the Royal Television Society and of the Royal Society of Arts. He served on the Boards of the British Film Institute and the UK Film Council.

In the 2023 ITVX miniseries Nolly, which dramatised the life of Noele Gordon, Denton was portrayed by Tim Wallers.

Media offices
Preceded by Mark Shivas	BBC Television Head of Drama; 1993–1996	Succeeded by Colin Adams
