= Tightrope Pictures =

Television production company

Tightrope Pictures is a British television production company, founded in late 2003 by writer Paul Abbott and producer Hilary Bevan-Jones, who had worked together that year on the successful BBC drama serial State of Play. The company has been responsible for several high-profile drama productions for the BBC, including the Richard Curtis-written The Girl in the Café (BBC One, 2005) and an adaptation of William Golding's novel To the Ends of the Earth (BBC Two, 2005).
