= Colin Adams (executive) =

British television executive

Colin Adams was a British television executive. In the 1990s he was the Head of Northern Broadcasting at the BBC, before in 1997 he was appointed as the Corporation's Head of Television Drama. Adams was chosen for the position despite having no background in drama programming, but the Corporation was eager to appoint somebody to the position which had not had a full-time occupant since the previous year, when Charles Denton had left.

== Career ==
In the meantime the job had been taken on a caretaker basis by first Ruth Caleb (Head of Drama at BBC Wales) and then Alan Yentob (Director of Television). Adams had initially been brought in to assist Yentob in running the department in an administrative capacity, which eventually led to his being offered the full-time post.

The department had been affected by the critical reception to many expensive projects such as Rhodes and the departure of senior producers such as Michael Wearing, and many more drama-related producers were reluctant to take the previously highly coveted position. Adams' appointment was not a particularly popular one with the drama staff, as he was seen as more of an administrator than a creative force.

He occupied the post for three years, until 2000.

Media offices
Preceded by Charles Denton	BBC Television Head of Drama; 1997–2000	Succeeded by Jane Tranter
