= Paul Abbott =

English writer and producer

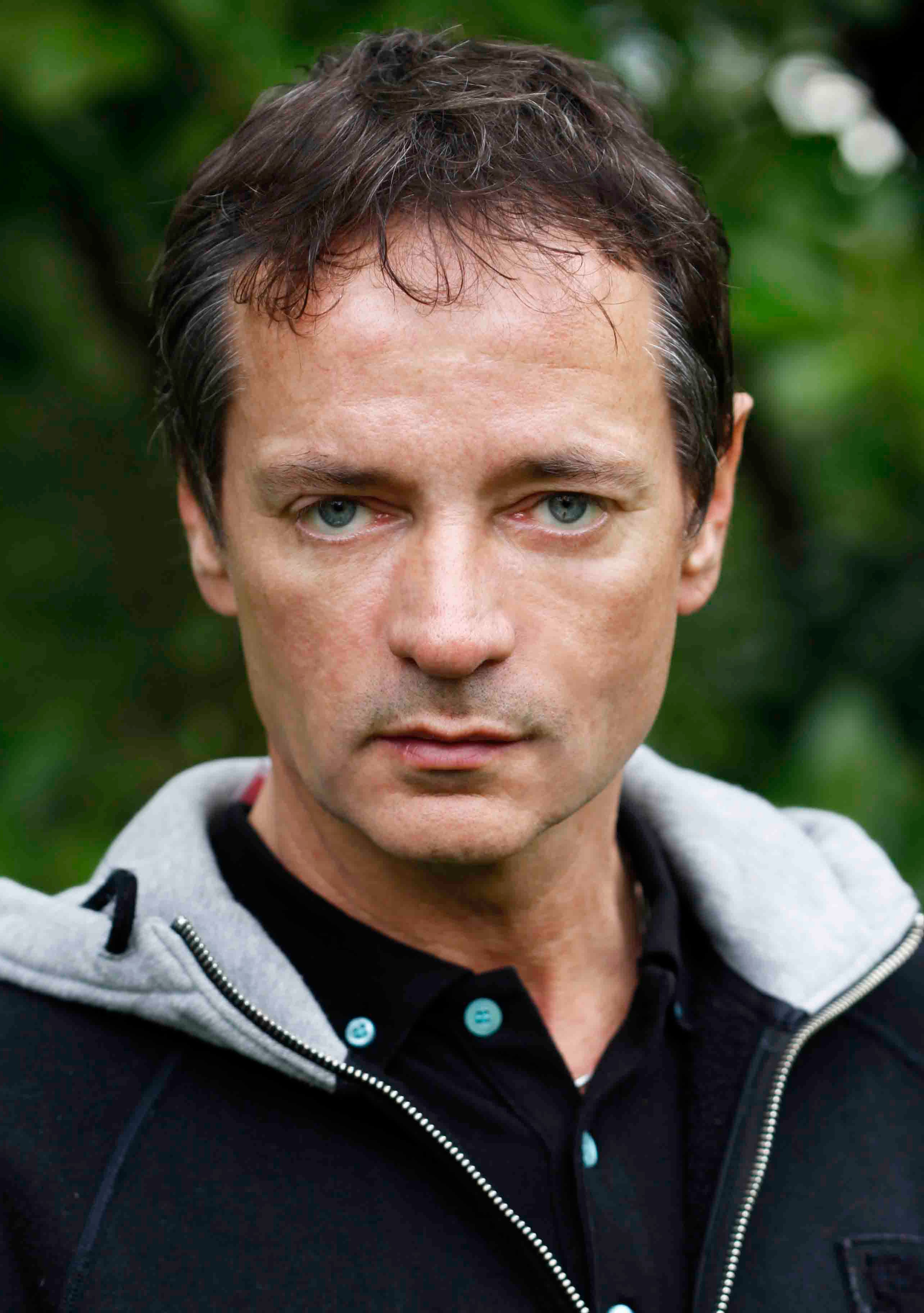
- Abbott in 2011
- Born: 22 February 1960 (age 66); Burnley, England
- Occupations: Screenwriter; producer
- Spouse(s): Sheila Culf (m. 1981; div. 1983) Saskia Downes (m. 1993; div. 2020)
- Writing career
- Years active: 1982–present

Paul Abbott (born 22 February 1960) is an English screenwriter and producer.

He became one of the most successful television writers in Britain following his work on popular series such as Coronation Street (1987–89, 1991–93), Cracker (1995, 1996, 1999), and more widely known for creating some of the most acclaimed television dramas of the 1990s and 2000s, including Reckless (1997), Touching Evil (1997–1999), Clocking Off (2000–2003), State of Play (2003), Shameless (2005–2013), and No Offence (2015–18).

== Early life ==
Abbott was born into a dysfunctional family in Burnley on 22 February 1960, the seventh of eight children. When he was nine, his mother left to pursue a relationship with another man who had a child around Abbott's own age; his father, whom Abbott described as "bone idle", departed two years later. His mother had supported the family with three jobs. Abbott and his siblings were left in the care of their pregnant 17-year-old sister. His father did not claim benefits for the family for fear of alerting social services to their abandonment. Although he constantly skipped school, Abbott later cited his English teacher at Sir John Thursby Community College as an early positive influence on him.

Abbott was raped by a stranger at the age of 11, leading to him jumping from the roof of a multi-storey car park in an attempt to take his own life. Two years later, after another suicide attempt, he was committed to an adult mental hospital; he later became a voluntary patient. On his release, he was taken into foster care and placed with a much more settled working-class family, where having two parents who held steady employment and owned a television and car was a new experience for him. At the same time, he began attending a local Sixth Form College and started attending meetings of the Burnley Writers' Circle after seeing their advert in the local public library. He enrolled at the University of Manchester in 1980 to study psychology, but decided to leave to concentrate on writing when a radio play he wrote was accepted by the BBC.

== Career ==
Abbott entered the Radio Times drama competition at the age of 22 which had the requirement to find a professional sponsor. A contact knew the address of the leading British dramatist Alan Bennett who, after seeing his script, was of the opinion that Abbott had written a perfectly acceptable piece of work which he would be happy to endorse. His work on radio plays for BBC Radio 4 attracted the attention of producers at ITV Granada who hired him, at age twenty-four, to be a script editor on their long-running soap opera Coronation Street. This made him at the time the youngest-ever person to occupy such a role on the programme.

He worked on Coronation Street for the next eight years as a story editor and from 1989 as a writer. He also worked on other programmes for Granada. In 1988, he co-wrote his first televised drama script, a one-off play for the Dramarama anthology, with fellow Coronation Street writer Kay Mellor. The same year, he and Mellor co-created the children's medical drama Children's Ward, which ran for many years—Abbott regularly contributed scripts until 1992, then returned briefly to the show in 1996.

In 1994, he worked as the producer on the second season of Granada's drama series Cracker, about the work of a criminal psychologist played by Robbie Coltrane. The following year he switched to writing scripts for the programme and wrote several episodes. He made his first breakthrough with a programme of his own creation, the police drama serial Touching Evil in 1997. The series, starring popular actor Robson Green, was a success, and two sequel serials—although not written by Abbott—followed. The series was re-made in 2004 for American television by the USA Network.

After writing another serial starring Green, Reckless and a few other productions for Granada, he began in 1999 a collaboration with the independent Red Production Company. He contributed an episode to their anthology series Love in the 21st Century, screened on Channel 4, and in 2000 created and wrote the series Clocking Off for them, which was screened on BBC One. Set in one factory in Lancashire, the series focused on a different member of factory staff each episode. The first season won the BAFTA award for Best Drama Series, and the equivalent at the Royal Television Society awards; Abbott personally was recognised with the RTS Best Writer award. Clocking Off ran for four seasons, although Abbott's contributions to the final two runs were minimal as he was by this time busy working on other projects.

In 2001, he created another Red series screened on BBC One, the comedy-drama Linda Green; although this was somewhat less successful and ran for only two seasons before cancellation. In 2000, he was due to adapt the D. H. Lawrence novel Sons and Lovers as a four-part television serial but pulled out due to work commitments.

2002 saw Abbott experimenting with a new genre when he wrote the political thriller State of Play, which was directed by David Yates and produced for the BBC by Hilary Bevan-Jones. In late 2003, Abbott and Bevan-Jones founded their own independent production company, Tightrope Pictures, based in Soho, London.

In early 2004, Channel 4 screened Shameless, a new Abbott series very loosely based on his experiences and family life growing up in Burnley, although the action of the programme itself was changed to Manchester in the present day. At the 2006 British Academy Television Awards, he was given the honorary Dennis Potter Award for Outstanding Writing in Television, and in July of the same year Radio Times magazine placed him at No. 5 in a poll of industry professionals to find The Most Powerful People in Television Drama. Abbott was the highest-placed writer on the list, those above him being actors and executives.

Tightrope Pictures have produced several high-profile dramas for the BBC, including Richard Curtis's The Girl in the Café (also directed by David Yates for BBC One, 2005) and an adaptation of William Golding's novel To the Ends of the Earth (BBC Two, 2005). In 2009, Abbott acted as executive producer on the film version of State of Play for Universal Pictures.

The first series of No Offence aired on Channel 4 beginning in May 2015. In 2021, Sky Max would broadcast Abbott's newest crime series, Wolfe.

== Academic recognition ==
In July 2006, it was announced that the University of Salford had appointed Abbott as a visiting professor; the same month, Manchester Metropolitan University awarded him with an honorary doctorate. His November 2006 lecture at Salford entitled "The 21st Century Box" explored how media is changing and provided "first aid for British television makers". Attendees included the Mayor and Mayoress of Salford.

In 2013, Dr. Beth Johnson from the University of Leeds published the first book-length academic study of Abbott's work alongside Manchester University Press.

In 2015, Abbott was awarded an honorary doctorate from Keele University.

== Writing credits ==
Production	Notes	Broadcaster
Dramarama	"Blackbird Singing in the Dead of Night" (1988)	ITV
Children's Ward	32 episodes (1989–1992)	ITV
Coronation Street	7 episodes (story associate, 1987–1989), 8 episodes (1991–1993)	ITV
Medics	"Born Losers" (1995)	ITV
Cracker	"Best Boys: Part 1" (1995); "Best Boys: Part 2" (1995); "True Romance: Part 1" (1995); "True Romance: Part 2" (1995); "White Ghost" (1996)	ITV
Springhill	Co-creator (1996-1997)	Channel 4/Sky One
Reckless	6 episodes (1997)	ITV
Touching Evil	16 episodes (1997–1999)	ITV
Police 2020	Unaired pilot (1997)	ITV
Reckless: The Sequel	Television film (1998)	ITV
Butterfly Collectors	Miniseries (1999)	ITV
Cracker: Mind Over Murder	"First Love: Part 1" (1999); "First Love: Part 2" (1999); "Best Boys" (1999)	ABC
Love in the 21st Century	"Reproduction" (1999)	Channel 4
The Secret World of Michael Fry	2 episodes (2000)	Channel 4
Best of Both Worlds	3 episodes (2001)	BBC One
Clocking Off	13 episodes (2000–2002)	BBC One
Linda Green	7 episodes (2001–2002)	BBC One
Tomorrow La Scala!	Feature film (co-written with Francesca Joseph, 2002)	N/A
State of Play	6 episodes (2003)	BBC One
Alibi	Television film (2003)	ITV
Shameless	11 seasons (2004–2013)	Channel 4
Mrs In-Betweeny	Television film (2008)	BBC Three
Exile	3 episodes (2011)	BBC One
Hit & Miss	6 episodes (2012)	Sky Atlantic
Twenty8k	Feature film (co-written with Jimmy Dowdall, 2012)	N/A
No Offence	8 episodes (2015–2018)	Channel 4
Wolfe	Pilot, also producer of series (2021–)	Sky Max

== Awards and nominations ==
Year	Award	Work	Category	Result	Reference
1993	Writers' Guild of Great Britain Award	Coronation Street	TV – Original Drama Series (with Martin Allen, Ken Blakeson, Frank Cottrell-Boyce, Tom Elliott, Barry Hill, Stephen Mallatratt, Julian Roach, Adele Rose, Patrea Smallacombe, John Stevenson, Peter Whalley, Mark Wadlow and Phil Woods)	Won	
1995	British Academy Television Awards	Cracker	Best Drama Series	Won	
1996	Writers' Guild of Great Britain Award	Cracker	TV – Original Drama Series (with Jimmy McGovern)	Won	
1998	Edgar Allan Poe Awards	Cracker: "White Ghost"	Best Television Feature or Miniseries	Nominated	
1998	British Academy Television Awards	Touching Evil	Best Drama Series (with Jane Featherstone)	Nominated	
1998	Royal Television Societys	Touching Evil	Best Writer	Nominated	
1998	Royal Television Societys	Reckless	Best Writer	Nominated	
2001	Royal Television Societys	Clocking Off	Best Writer	Won	
2001	Royal Television Societys	Clocking Off	Best Drama Series (with Nicola Shindler and Ann Harrison-Baxter)	Won	
2002	TRIC Awards	Linda Green	Comedy (with Beryl Richards and Matthew Bird)	Won	
2002	British Academy Television Awards	Clocking Off	Best Drama Series (with Nicola Shindler and Juliet Charlesworth)	Nominated	
2003	British Academy Television Awards	Clocking Off	Best Drama Series (with Nicola Shindler and Juliet Charlesworth)	Nominated	
2003	British Academy Television Awards	State of Play	Best Drama Series (with David Yates and Hilary Bevan Jones)	Nominated	
2004	British Academy Television Awards	Shameless	Dennis Potter Award	Won	
2004	Broadcasting Press Guild	Shameless	Writer's Award	Won	
2004	Prix Italia	Shameless	TV Drama - Series and Serials (with Mark Mylod, Dearbhla Walsh and Jonny Campbell (director))	Nominated	
2004	Golden Nymph	State of Play	Mini-Series - Best Script	Won	
2005	Broadcasting Press Guild Awards	State of Play	Writer's Award	Won	
2005	Edgar Awards	State of Play	Best Television Feature or Mini-Series Teleplay	Won	
2005	Primetime Emmy Awards	The Girl in the Café	Outstanding Made for Television Movie (with Richard Curtis and Hilary Bevan Jones)	Won	
2005	National Comedy Awards	Shameless	Best TV Comedy Drama	Won	
2005	Royal Television Society Awards	Shameless	Best Writer	Won	
2006	Royal Television Society Awards	Shameless	Best Writer	Nominated	
2006	Banff Rockie Award	Shameless	Best Continuing Series	Nominated	
2007	Royal Television Society Awards	Instinct	Best Drama Series (with Terry McDonough, Paul Frift and Hilary Bevan Jones)	Won	
2008	TRIC Awards	Shameless	TV Drama Programme	Nominated	
2009	British Academy Television Awards	Shameless	Best Drama Series (with George Faber, John Griffin and Johann Knobel)	Nominated	
2009	TV Choices	Shameless	Best Drama Series	Nominated	
2010	TV Choices	Shameless	Best Drama Series	Nominated	
2010	TRIC Awards	Shameless	TV Drama Programme	Nominated	
2011	TV Quick Awards	Shameless	Best Drama Series	Nominated	
2011	National Television Awards	Shameless	Most Popular Drama	Nominated	
2012	British Academy Television Awards	Shameless	Best Soap & Continuing Drama (with George Faber, David Threlfall and Lawrence Till)	Nominated	
2014	OFTA Television Awards	Shameless	Best Writing in a Comedy Series (with John Wells, Nancy Pimental, Etan Frankel, Sheila Callaghan, Davey Holmes and Krista Vernoff)	Nominated	
2016	RTS Programme Awards	No Offence	Best Drama Series (with Martin Carr, Catherine Morshead and Anna Ferguson)	Won	
2016	BAFTA Television Awards	No Offence	Best Drama Series (with Martin Carr, Catherine Morshead and Anna Ferguson)	Nominated	
