= Hilary Bevan Jones =

British television producer

- Occupation: Television producer
- Years active: 1979–present

Hilary Bevan Jones is a British television producer. In 1994 she started Endor Productions, choosing the name from that of the novel The Road to Endor by E. H. Jones, her grandfather. Endor has produced series such as Deep State and Vienna Blood.

== Career ==
Bevan Jones started work as a floor assistant at the BBC in 1979; she had previously worked as a teacher in Essex, after trying without success to get work in theatre. She worked on comedy programmes such as Not the Nine O'Clock News and Blackadder.

She left the BBC in 1990. She worked on Cracker for Granada Television, where she first worked with the writer Paul Abbott. After she again worked with Abbott on State of Play in 2003, they together started Tightrope Pictures, which produced the Richard Curtis piece The Girl in the Café, starring Bill Nighy and produced by Bevan Jones.

She was chairman of BAFTA from 2006 to 2008, the first woman in that position.

In 2012, Bevan Jones sold Endor to Seven.One Studios (then Red Arrow Entertainment Group). On June 5, 2024, it was announced that Seven.One was shutting down Endor, due to financial difficulties in the television market.

Since 2009 she has chaired the Watersprite Film Festival in Cambridge.
