= State of Play (TV series) =

2003 British drama series by Paul Abbott

- UK DVD cover
- Genre: Conspiracy thriller Political thriller
- Created by: Paul Abbott
- Written by: Paul Abbott
- Directed by: David Yates
- Starring: David Morrissey; John Simm; Kelly Macdonald; Polly Walker; Bill Nighy; James McAvoy; Marc Warren; Philip Glenister
- Composer: Nicholas Hooper
- Country of origin: United Kingdom
- Original language: English
- No. of series: 1
- No. of episodes: 6

Production
- Executive producers: Gareth Neame; Laura Mackie; Paul Abbott
- Producer: Hilary Bevan Jones
- Production location: London
- Cinematography: Chris Seager
- Editor: Mark Day
- Running time: 56—58 minutes
- Production company: Endor Productions

Original release
- Network: BBC One
- Release: 18 May – 22 June 2003

State of Play is a British television drama series, written by Paul Abbott and directed by David Yates, that was first broadcast on BBC One in 2003. The series tells the story of a newspaper's investigation into the death of a political researcher, and centres on the relationship between the leading journalist, Cal McCaffrey, and his old friend, Stephen Collins, who is a Member of Parliament and the murdered woman's employer. The series is primarily set in London and was produced in-house by the BBC in association with the independent production company Endor Productions. The series stars David Morrissey, John Simm, Kelly Macdonald, Polly Walker, Bill Nighy, and James McAvoy in the main roles.

The series was Abbott's first attempt to write a political thriller, and he initially made the majority of the plot up as he went along. He was prompted to write the series after BBC Head of Drama Jane Tranter asked him whether he would consider writing a piece "bigger" than anything he had written so far in his career. The serial was Abbott's third major writing project for the channel, following Clocking Off and Linda Green. The series was also a major turning point in David Yates's directorial career, as he began to direct various high-profile television projects following his work on the series.

The six-part series was a primetime broadcast on BBC One on Sunday evenings at 9:00 pm from 18 May to 22 June 2003. Episodes two to five were initially premiered on the digital television channel BBC Four at 10:00 pm on the nights of the preceding episodes' BBC One broadcast. However, episode six was held back for a premiere on BBC One, so as not to allow the final twists to be spoiled for those who did not have access to digital television. In 2004, the series ran in the United States on the BBC America cable channel. In 2005, the series was released on DVD by BBC Worldwide, in a two-disc set. Episode one features an audio commentary from Abbott and Yates, and episode six a commentary from Yates, producer Hilary Bevan-Jones, and editor Mark Day.

The success of the series and its favourable impression on BBC executives led to Abbott being commissioned to write a sequel, before the first series had even been aired. In 2006, however, a second series appeared to have been abandoned, with Abbott telling Mark Lawson on Front Row for BBC Radio 4 in November that he "couldn't find a way to make the story work".

== Plot ==
While investigating the murder of fifteen-year-old Kelvin Stagg in what appears to be a drug-related gangland killing, journalist Cal McCaffrey of The Herald and his colleagues Della Smith and editor Cameron Foster find a connection with the death on the same day of Sonia Baker, a young political researcher for rising star MP Stephen Collins. As their investigation progresses, a love affair scandal between Collins and Baker rapidly emerges and they uncover not only a connection between the murders, but also a political conspiracy having links to petroleum industry-backed corruption of high-ranking British Government ministers.

== Cast ==
- David Morrissey as Stephen Collins MP for a Manchester constituency and chairman of the Energy Select Committee
- John Simm as Callum 'Cal' McCaffrey, a senior investigative journalist for broadsheet newspaper The Herald and former political campaign manager for Collins
- Kelly MacDonald as Della Smith, a junior reporter for The Herald
- Bill Nighy as Cameron Foster, the editor for The Herald
- James McAvoy as Dan Foster, a freelance journalist and the errant son of Cameron Foster
- Amelia Bullmore as Helen Preger, the political correspondent for The Herald
- Benedict Wong as Pete Cheng, the business correspondent for The Herald
- Christopher Simpson as Adam Greene, company lawyer for The Herald
- Rebekah Staton as Liz Dixon, a receptionist / telephonist for The Herald
- Tom Burke as Syd Hardy, a clerical assistant for The Herald
- David Ryall as Bob Coutts, the newspaper proprietor of The Herald
- Geraldine James as Yvonne Shaps, the legal executive and representative for Coutts, proprietor of The Herald
- Polly Walker as Anne Collins, the wife of Stephen Collins MP and the manager of a large record store in Manchester near his constituency
- Charlie Ryan as Louis Collins, Stephen and Anne's elder child
- Rebecca Ryan as Karen Collins, Stephen and Anne's younger child
- Deborah Findlay as Greer Thornton, the political office manager for Collins
- James Laurenson as the Rt Hon. George Fergus MP, the Secretary of State for Energy and Cabinet minister
- Michael Feast as Andrew Wilson, a senior governing party political advisor and spin doctor
- Shauna MacDonald as Sonia Baker, a political researcher for Collins
- Marc Warren as Dominic Foy, a small business director in public relations, sub-contracting work for petroleum industry lobbyists Warner-Schloss, and friend of Sonia Baker
- Susie Porter as Susan Sagattchean, the US Head of Communications and Public Relations for U-EX Oil petroleum industry
- Michael Pennington as Richard Siegler, a UK senior executive officer for U-EX Oil petroleum industry
- Philip Glenister as Detective Chief Inspector William Bell
- Rory McCann as Detective Inspector Stuart Brown, working for DCI Bell
- Sean Gilder as Detective Sergeant Mark 'Chewy' Cheweski, working for DCI Bell
- Pui Fan Lee as Joy Cipriani, a forensic scientist in the coroners' office
- Stuart Goodwin as Robert Bingham, a hitman
- Gregory Poorman as Kelvin Stagg, a 15-year-old bag-snatcher
- Johann Myers as Sonny Stagg, Kelvin's older brother
- Maureen Hibbert as Olicia Stagg, Kelvin's mother
- Finn Atkins as Kelvin Stagg's girlfriend

== Episodes ==
No.	Title	Directed by	Written by	Original release date	Viewers (millions)
1	"Episode 1"	David Yates	Paul Abbott	5.78	18 May 2003
Fifteen-year-old bag-snatcher Kelvin Stagg is shot dead on the streets of London. A witness is also shot. Meanwhile, political researcher Sonia Baker (Shauna MacDonald) is also found dead, having seemingly fallen under a tube train in an accident. Stagg's family claim that his portrayal in the media – seemingly led by the police – is untrue, and despite claims, he was never involved in the sale of drugs, and was simply a pickpocket. Kelvin's brother Sonny eventually tells journalist Cal McCaffrey (John Simm) that shortly prior to his death, Kelvin acquired a potentially lucrative briefcase and was trying to sell it back to its owner for £200. Upon getting the briefcase, Cal discovers that it contains a gun and surveillance material starring Sonia Baker. Aware that Baker may also have been murdered, McCaffrey informs fellow journalist Della Smith (Kelly MacDonald), who tries to convince the police to place an armed guard at the bedside of the witness, fearing a reprisal attack. She is interrupted when a fire alarm is activated in the hospital. Whilst trying to move the victim to safety, DI Stuart Brown (Rory McCann) is killed by a sniper just metres from her.
2	"Episode 2"	David Yates	Paul Abbott	4.58	25 May 2003
A new lead detective, DCI William Bell (Philip Glenister), is assigned to the case. With phone records seemingly confirming a link between the two victims, the investigation continues to gather pace. Smith investigates the origin of a letter sent to the wife of Stephen Collins MP (David Morrissey), a close friend of Sonia. Smith discovers that a fellow journalist from the Mail, Dan Foster (James McAvoy), has obtained a copy of a document supposedly confirming that Collins intended to leave his wife and move in with Baker. Aware that Foster is somehow ahead of the game, Smith tries to convince her editor Cameron Foster (Bill Nighy) to employ his estranged wayward son as a freelance investigator. Dan reveals that he traced the unidentified party who sent the fax works in the nearby Apex house. After luring the perpetrator into a trap, he identifies the man as Dominic Foy (Marc Warren). Dan, Smith, and colleague Pete Cheng (Benedict Wong) prepare to speak to Foy, who does not want to co-operate. Meanwhile, Smith returns home from a night out with colleague Helen Preger (Amelia Bullmore), discovers that her flat was broken into, and accuses DCI Bell of masterminding the raid in to uncover information previously undisclosed to the police. Smith realises that she has no choice but to declare to the police that the team hold a potentially vital piece of evidence in the briefcase, and Bell subsequently arrests Cal for withholding evidence, wanting to prosecute him for perverting the course of justice.
3	"Episode 3"	David Yates	Paul Abbott	5.55	1 June 2003
DCI Bell agrees to a deal with Foster and McCaffrey to provide a decoy for Smith, and McCaffrey is placed under the armed guard of DS Cheweski (Sean Gilder). During a midnight game of cards, McCaffrey receives a call from Anne and informs Cheweski that he intends to meet a 'contact'. As they head to a nearby hotel, Cheweski waits on guard. However, their movement has not gone unnoticed, and Cheweski soon realises that a rear security door to the hotel has been breached, and that the hit-man is inside. As a deadly game of cat and mouse pursues, Cheweski manages to chase the hit-man into the line of police fire. Meanwhile, Bell interviews Collins and suggests that the regular payments being made into Baker's account were the fruits of a blackmail plot, but Collins denies any malicious intent. Bell receives the final toxicology report on Kelvin Stagg, but the report now shows that Stagg's blood contained high levels of crack cocaine, whereas the initial report showed nothing unusual in his bloodstream. He confides to Smith that he is under pressure from his superior officers to close the investigation: he and Cheweski agree to cooperate more with the journalists. As Anne and McCaffrey's relationship begins to blossom, they are caught in the middle of a sexual encounter by a furious Collins. When it becomes apparent that Foy has a stronger connection to Baker than first thought, he soon becomes the prime target for both McCaffrey and DCI Bell. McCaffrey hatches a plan to catch Foy as he departs an inbound flight from Spain, and tries to persuade him to reveal his side of the story by creating the suggestion that the police are desperate to talk to him.
4	"Episode 4"	David Yates	Paul Abbott	5.28	8 June 2003
Foy is taken to a city hotel and questioned by McCaffrey, while Dan, Preger and Cheng conduct a thorough search of his flat. Foy claims that he and Sonia had previously been in a relationship, but the accuracy of his claims is questioned by transcriptor Syd (Tom Burke), who claims that he had a sexual encounter with Foy several years previously. Preger uncovers a series of bank statements suggesting that Foy was paid £75,000 by a firm of lobbyists, Warner-Schloss, who are seemingly incorporated within U-Ex Oil, a multi-national oil company who appear to have an axe to grind with the energy committee. McCaffrey comes to the conclusion that Baker may have been a spy planted by the company, but is still unable to work out why they would have wanted her dead. In an attempt to ramp up the pressure, Smith tries to convince Bell to create a smoke screen by trying to trace Foy at both his home and work addresses. Foster tries to convince Collins to keep quiet about McCaffrey's affair with his wife. As Collins tries to make account to the police for the withdrawal of £2,000 per month from his personal bank account, he discovers that a weekend away with Baker in a country hotel, which remained unpaid, was in fact paid in full by Warner-Schloss. Foy begins to become paranoid when it appears that he is being followed, unaware that McCaffrey is in fact keeping tabs on him. Foster is told by the newspaper's owner to end the investigation quickly.
5	"Episode 5"	David Yates	Paul Abbott	4.67	15 June 2003
Foy turns to McCaffrey for help as his paranoia begins to get the better of him. Smith convinces him to return to the hotel for a second interview, and McCaffrey invites Collins to listen in. During the interview, Foy makes a shocking claim that Baker disclosed to him that she was pregnant during the panic phone call on the morning of her death. Collins is unable to contain his anger and physically lashes out at Foy. Meanwhile, as it becomes clear that Baker's position in Collins's department was engineered by his secretary, Greer Thornton (Deborah Findlay), McCaffrey confronts her and discovers that Baker was employed on the recommendation of George Fergus MP (James Laurenson), who claimed to know her family personally. Collins is furious to discover his colleague's actions and warns him that he intends to take action. As McCaffrey tries to uncover evidence that Fergus was bribed by U-Ex Oil, Foster is warned by the newspaper proprietor, Bob Coutts to put a lid on the story. However, just as he plans to ignore Coutts's orders and go to print, a gagging order is issued, preventing him from printing any aspects of the story. Unprepared to let matters lie, Foster prints a four page spread which reads just: "The Story We Can't Tell You. Because Westminster is Gagging Us. Ask U-EX Oil Why. Ask Your MP Why." As a result, Cameron is informed that his contract will be terminated, and Yvonne Shaps (Geraldine James) a new temporary administrating editor is brought in. Fergus tells Collins that senior figures in the government knew that Sonia was working for U-Ex Oil, but let her remain there rather than upset the company unnecessarily.
6	"Episode 6"	David Yates	Paul Abbott	5.27	22 June 2003
Despite political and legal pressure, the investigation by McCaffrey and the Herald team begins to bear fruit, in particular thanks to information from an executive at U-EX, who subsequently takes his own life. After the revelation concerning Baker, Collins decides to help the journalist by revealing everything he knows, preferring to refuse a post of minister after realizing that the leaders of the party were aware of Baker's activities. But following an involuntary drunken revelatory slip from Collins, McCaffrey understands the truth about his friend MP: he had enlisted the services of a former soldier, Robert Bingham, that he used to tutor, in order to monitor Baker's actions and contacts. But according to Collins, Bingham began to exceed his brief and acted alone out of idolisation of him, resulting in the murder of Baker and Stagg. In shock, McCaffrey hands his recording of Collins's confession to Smith and Foster, who inform DCI Bell. At the same time, Foy is arrested by the police as he prepares to flee England. The relationship between McCaffrey and Anne comes to an end when the former cannot bear that the latter, who ignores everything, feels ready to return to Stephen. Ultimately, the lead the paper can come up with is not the political story it hoped for, but a sex and crime story about a deposed MP.

== Reception ==
Reviewing the first episode for The Guardian newspaper the day after it had aired, Gareth McLean wrote that "...it's bloody magic. The story is gripping, the acting is ace and Paul Abbott's script is outstanding. His ear for dialogue, and for different voices, is exceptional. The exposition is swift, nifty and joyously unclunky. The characters are credible and rounded. If you can count the best dramas of recent years on the fingers of both hands, it's time to grow a new finger." Other newspaper critics were similarly impressed with the opening instalment. In The Times, Paul Hoggart wrote that "Two excellent performances [from Morrissey and Simm] ensure that the relationship has a turbulent dynamism that is credible and engaging." James Walton in The Daily Telegraph was more cautious, feeling that the opening episode had been promising but the serial as a whole still had the potential to go wrong. "At this stage however, the programme is certainly good enough to make me hope not and to ensure that I'll be back next week to find out."

The consensus appeared to be that the serial maintained its quality to the end. Previewing episode four, Jonathan Wright of "The Guide" section in The Guardian described it as "a political conspiracy thriller that's as buttock-clenchingly tense as Edge of Darkness, as cynical about the British political system as House of Cards, and stands comparisons to both." The television critic of The Independent, Tom Sutcliffe, wrote of the final episode: "I'm not sure that a thriller can end in anything other than anti-climax. If it has been good you're sad it's over, and if it ends badly you're quite likely to feel that you've been duped. Paul Abbott's State of Play, which has had me swallowing double doses on a Sunday evening whenever the schedules allowed, left us with the first kind of let-down rather than the second."

Bill Nighy won the British Academy Television Award for Best Actor for his role. The series also won a Peabody Award in 2004 and won BAFTAs for Best Sound (Fiction/Entertainment) and Best Editing (Fiction/Entertainment). It was nominated, but did not win, in the Best Actor category again, for Morrissey; in the Best Drama Serial category; Best Original Television Music and Best Photography and Lighting. It also won major awards from the Royal Television Society, Banff Television Festival, Broadcasting Press Guild, Cologne Conference, Directors Guild of Great Britain, Edgar Awards, and the Monte Carlo TV Festival.

== Adaptation ==
State of Play was adapted into an Americanized feature film that was released in the United States in April 2009. The plot retained substantial similarities to the original six-hour series, retaining the main characters, but with its location changed to Washington, D.C., and with certain aspects condensed and changed in order to fit the two-hour format.

The film was directed by Kevin Macdonald from a screenplay written by Matthew Michael Carnahan, Tony Gilroy, Peter Morgan, and Billy Ray. Ben Affleck, Russell Crowe, Rachel McAdams and Helen Mirren appear in the lead roles. In an April 2009 interview to promote the film, Affleck, who plays Congressman Stephen Collins, said he drew on the experiences of Gary Condit, Eliot Spitzer, and John Edwards while preparing for the role. The film was generally well received, but not as lauded as the series.
