= Reunited (TV pilot) =

- Intertitle
- Genre: Comedy drama
- Created by: Mike Bullen; David Maher; David Taylor
- Written by: Mike Bullen
- Directed by: Simon Delaney
- Starring: Zoë Tapper; Joseph Millson; Emma Stansfield; Ed Byrne; Navin Chowdhry; Jemima Rooper; Michelle Terry; Sarah-Jane Potts; Ella Choudhury; Yasmine Hulf
- Composer: Mark Russell
- Country of origin: United Kingdom
- No. of episodes: 1

Production
- Executive producers: Mike Bullen; Pete Thornton
- Producer: Rosemary McGowan
- Cinematography: Gavin Finney
- Running time: 60 minutes
- Production company: BBC Productions

Original release
- Network: BBC One
- Release: 30 June 2010

Reunited is a British television pilot written by Mike Bullen and directed by Simon Delaney. It was first broadcast on BBC One on 30 June 2010.

== Plot ==
Eight years after sharing a flat together while students at university, six friends reunite.

== Production ==
Reunited is the first screenplay written by Mike Bullen for the BBC since his comedy drama Sunburn (1999–2000). The idea came to him after an Australian friend of his met up with a group of people with whom he had shared a house. Although Bullen had emigrated to Australia in 2002, he returned to the UK for the five months Reunited was in production, as he had only faxed in the scripts for his last British series, All About George. Reunited was filmed on location in London in March 2010. Some scenes were filmed at Sam's Bar & Brasserie in Chiswick, London.

Ed Byrne's character was originally called "Ed" but was changed to "Rob" after Byrne was concerned that viewers would attribute "Ed"'s negative characteristics to him in real life.

== Reception ==
Reunited was first broadcast on BBC One on 30 June 2010. Overnight ratings data gave an average of 3.3 million viewers, with a 15.3% audience share during its timeslot; it was beaten by a repeat of Midsomer Murders on ITV.

The programme was selected as "Pick of the Day" in The Sunday Times, where critic John Dugdale wrote, "There's been so much bittersweet fiction since [Mike Bullen's Cold Feet debuted in 1997], and as this is about pals in their thirties, novelty is impossible and clichés inevitable. This opener has the familiar genre failing, too, of being neither comic nor involvingly dramatic – it is hard to care who Hannah ends up with, and a glimpse of Byrne's chest provides the funniest moment. Still, the cast is terrific, and Bullen hasn't lost his gift for memorable individual scenes." The Liverpool Echo also selected as a highlight for Wednesday evening. In a positive preview, The Guardian's John Robinson compared it to the This Life reunion episode This Life +10. The Daily Telegraph's Ceri Radford called it "a grown-up Coupling" and concluded her preview by writing, "It's a funny, touching portrayal of a group of friends who are old enough to be disappointed with life but young enough to try fixing things with tequila slammers and casual sex."

The BBC did not commission a series, though Ed Byrne has discussed other projects with Mike Bullen.

This has not been released on DVD yet.
