= Rachel Bradley =

Fictional character

- Cold Feet character
- Portrayed by: Helen Baxendale
- Duration: 1997–2003
- First appearance: Pilot; 30 March 1997
- Last appearance: Series 5, Episode 4; 16 March 2003
- Created by: Mike Bullen
In-universe information
- Occupation: Advertising account manager
- Father: Brian Bradley
- Mother: Mary Bradley
- Sisters: Lucy Bradley
- Husband: Kris Bumstead (1992–1998); Adam Williams (2000–2003)
- Sons: Matthew Williams

Rachel Louise Bradley is a fictional character portrayed by Helen Baxendale in the British comedy-drama television series Cold Feet. Rachel is introduced in the pilot episode (1997), where she begins a relationship with Adam Williams (James Nesbitt). Their relationship has highs and lows throughout the series; Rachel reveals a secret husband in the first series (1998) and has an abortion in the second (1999), which supposedly prevents her from conceiving a child in the future. She and Adam marry in the third series (2000) and are surprised to discover that she is pregnant in the fourth (2001). They both begin raising their child in the fifth series (2003), but Rachel's life is cut short when she is killed in a car crash.

The character was originally devised as "the fantasy girlfriend", and was constructed as an amalgamation of writer Mike Bullen's female friends. As the series was developed, input into Rachel's storylines was provided by Cold Feet's producers Andy Harries and Christine Langan; Rachel and Adam attempt in vitro fertilisation in the third series, which Harries and his wife had also tried. It was originally planned for Rachel and Adam to adopt a child during the fourth series, but Helen Baxendale's real-life pregnancy meant the storyline had to be rewritten.

Both character and actress received mixed reviews from critics throughout the series; Baxendale received the Best Actress award from the Broadcasting Press Guild for her portrayal of Rachel in the pilot and was nominated for a British Comedy Award. However, television reviewers criticised the character when the series began. Rachel's diagnosis with Asherman's syndrome in the fourth series drew criticism from the British Pregnancy Advisory Service, which had been consulted during the writing of the storyline. When the series ended, there was a 20% increase in the number of people taking out life insurance policies with one provider, Tesco Personal Finance, which a spokesperson for the company attributed to Rachel's premature death.

== Creation and backstory ==
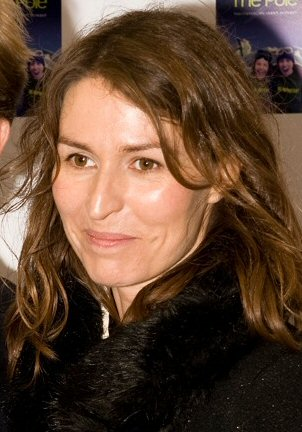
Helen Baxendale played Rachel Bradley for all five series of Cold Feet.

Rachel Bradley was devised by writer Mike Bullen as one of the two central characters in the pilot episode of Cold Feet, the other being Adam Williams.

Helen Baxendale, then popularly known for her starring role as Dr Claire Maitland in the BBC medical drama Cardiac Arrest, became available halfway through the casting process of the pilot, and was invited to audition. Baxendale was initially reluctant to read for the role, as she believed that she would not be able to give a good comic performance. Executive producer Andy Harries persuaded her that she had already performed black comedy in Cardiac Arrest, and so would be well-suited to the part of Rachel. Producer Christine Langan described Baxendale as "perfect for the idolized Rachel" and her reading with Nesbitt as having "unmistakable chemistry". Hermione Norris also auditioned for the role, but Baxendale was eventually cast. By the time of the third series, Baxendale's initial concerns had gone and she felt comfortable acting with the comic actors. Speaking retrospectively, she found Rachel difficult to play:

I was playing the nice girl. It's really hard to play. All the other characters came from somebody and I said to Mike [the writer], 'Where do I come from?' And he said, 'You were the fantasy girl.' I found it hard to make anything of that. In the end I felt the only thing I could do was to make it as hyper real as I could. I'm not a natural comedienne.

The character's backstory is presented in Cold Feet: A Man's/Woman's Guide to Life, which was compiled by Jonathan Rice from Mike Bullen's scripts. Rachel read French at the University of Manchester, then spent a season working as a chalet girl in the French Alps. There she met Karen (Hermione Norris) who became her best friend. When both returned to England, Karen married David Marsden (Robert Bathurst) and Rachel began a career in the advertising industry.

== Character arc ==
=== Relationship with Adam ===
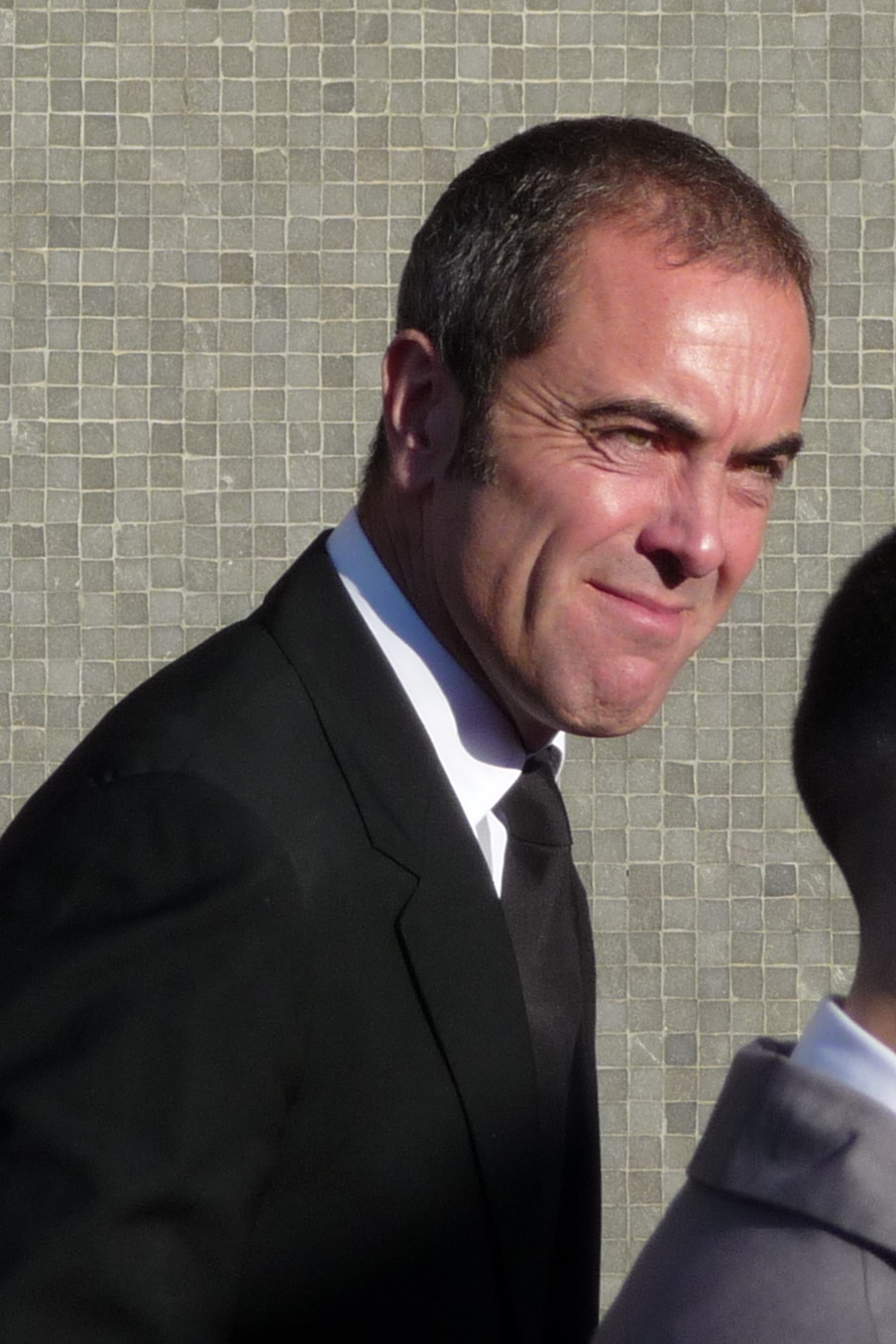
In the pilot, Rachel begins a relationship with Adam, played by James Nesbitt.

At the beginning of the pilot episode, Rachel is dumped by her boyfriend Simon Atkinson (Stephen Mapes), who has recently taken a job in Hong Kong and does not want to "burden" Rachel with deciding whether to emigrate with him. Shortly afterwards, her car collides with that of Adam Williams on a supermarket car park. The two get into a row over whose fault the crash was and he smoothes things over by giving him her phone number, ostensibly in case there is a problem with the insurance. She writes her number in the muck on his rear windscreen but it later washes off in the rain. Some time later, Rachel's friend Karen advises her to call Adam and go on a date with him. Their first date does not go well, but they see each other again. Three months later, they row, and Rachel gets back together with Simon, who has returned from Hong Kong. Adam wins her back by serenading her while wearing nothing but a rose between his buttocks.

The first series begins nine months later. Rachel and Adam move into their first house together. He is horrified to discover that she has been married for over six years. She contacts her husband Kris Bumstead (Lennie James) and after briefly considering going back to him and dumping Adam, she gets the divorce. After a misunderstanding with Karen, Rachel worries that Adam has stopped finding her sexually attractive, and they agree to indulge in each other's sexual fantasies. Rachel shares hers with Adam: to have sex in a shop window. Adam arranges to get the keys to a shop, and he and Rachel act out her fantasy, though they are arrested when a ram-raider leads the police to them.

In Series 1, Episode 6, Rachel reveals to Karen that she is pregnant, but is unsure whether the father is Adam or Kris, whom she had sex with while he was in Manchester. She devastates Adam by first turning down his proposal of marriage, after he believes he is the father of the child, and then by leaving Manchester on a train. Adam arrives at the station shortly before her train leaves and pledges to love the child regardless of who its father is. Rachel demonstrates that he does not mean it, and the train departs for London.

=== Abortion and infertility ===
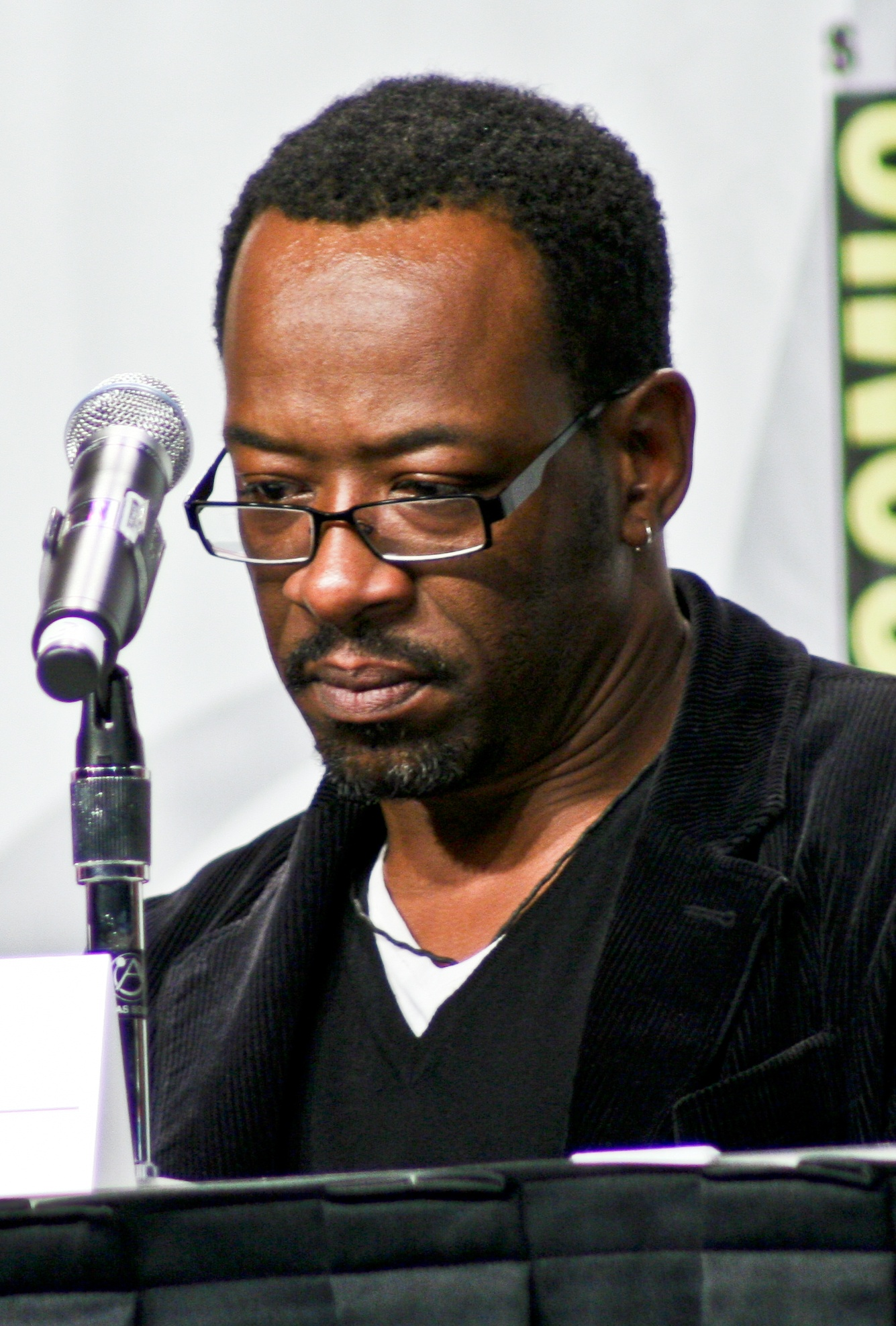
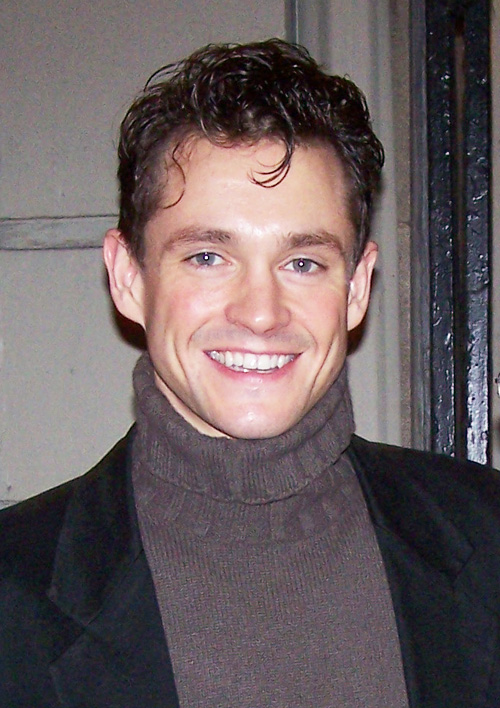
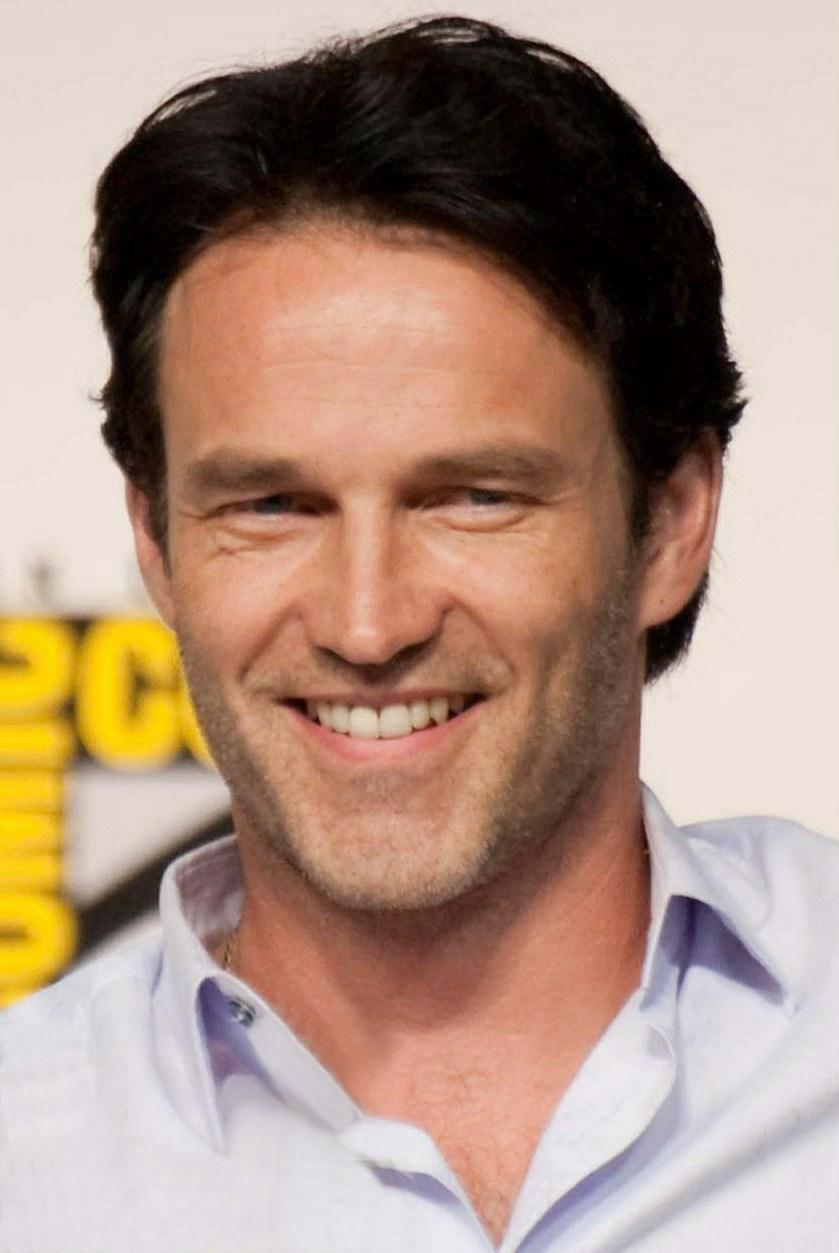
Rachel has relationships and flings with characters played by Lennie James (l), Hugh Dancy (c) and Stephen Moyer (r).

Six months later, Rachel returns to Manchester, and moves into Karen and David's spare room. After Pete spots her at the supermarket, Adam prepares for what he thinks will be her homecoming with his child. Instead, Rachel reveals that she had the pregnancy terminated, unable to cope with not knowing whether the father was Adam or Kris. The abortion story was devised to avoid having all three couples in the series having children. Bullen and the executive producers Andy Harries and Christine Langan all agreed that having Rachel suffer a miscarriage would be a "cop out" but they split on whether she should terminate the pregnancy; Harries worried about the effect it would have on the character within the narrative, and what the audience would think of her, while Langan convinced him that it would be braver and more realistic for the character to go through with it.

Rachel ponders whether to get back together with Adam but is left humiliated when she arrives at his house in the middle of the night and finds him apparently in the middle of an orgy with his new girlfriend Amy (Rosie Cavaliero) and lodger "Rachel 2" (Rachel Fielding). She resolves to get her old job back, and starts dating a co-worker, the much younger Danny Burke (Hugh Dancy). After a short fling, she dumps Danny and agrees to be friends with Adam, even accompanying him to his school reunion. She then has a brief flirtation with David's younger wayward brother Nick Marsden (Stephen Moyer) before getting back together with Adam after learning he has had treatment for testicular cancer. On a trip away to Lindisfarne to see in the year 2000, Rachel feels she is ready to put their past incidents behind her.

Now in a committed relationship, Rachel and Adam begin trying for a baby. The storyline was devised because Harries wanted Cold Feet to reflect relevant issues in contemporary society; in vitro fertilisation featured heavily in the news during 2000, and Harries felt that incorporating it into the series would help to raise awareness of it, as well as provide fodder for the characters' story arcs. Rachel's intracytoplasmic sperm injection treatment incorporated aspects of the real life IVF treatment experienced by Harries and his wife Rebecca Frayn, and eminent fertility scientist Sammy Lee was consulted extensively throughout the development of the plot. After spending several thousand pounds on IVF treatment, Rachel's doctor informs her that she is infertile due to Asherman's syndrome, most likely caused by her abortion. Despite being unable to have children naturally, Rachel and Adam are determined to continue their relationship; Adam proposes to her and they are married in a civil ceremony in Series 3, Episode 8. In the same episode, she is reunited with her estranged parents, Brian and Mary (Paul Ridley and Sue Holderness). Before the episode, Rachel had not spoken to them for years; her father because of his bigotry and abuse of her mother, and her mother for staying with him. She refuses to allow Paul to give her away, and instead asks David to, despite learning that he has been having an extra-marital affair. At the reception, she inadvertently reveals to her parents that her sister, their other daughter Lucy, has come out as a lesbian.

=== Son, death and funeral ===
At the beginning of Series 4, Rachel is broody and upset that she is infertile. She and Adam begin an application process for an adoption, and are soon paired up with eight-year-old Laura (Katie Riddoch), the daughter of a drug addict. Adam and Laura bond at their first meeting at her foster home, and Adam and Rachel begin plans for her to move in with them. However, after a routine hospital appointment reveals that Rachel is four months pregnant, social worker Ruth Wylie (Samantha Spiro) retracts the adoption application, concerned about the effect a new baby will have on Laura if she moves in with Adam and Rachel. Adam and Rachel vow to take legal action against the adoption agency but change their minds after Laura's foster mother Jean (Jacqueline Pilton) persuades them to think of the effect it will have on Laura. Reluctantly, Adam and Rachel walk away from the adoption and instead plan for their own baby. The original Series 4 story arc for Adam and Rachel was radically different, and had to be changed considerably after Helen Baxendale learned she was pregnant. Mike Bullen quipped at the time, "We're looking at a number of ideas, including alien abduction". Though heavily pregnant, Rachel's doctor advises her that it is safe to fly to Australia for Pete and Jo's (John Thomson and Kimberley Joseph) wedding in Series 4, Episode 8. On the day of the wedding ceremony, Rachel collapses outside the hotel, having gone into labour two months prematurely, and is rushed to hospital. She gives birth to a boy, whom she names Matthew Sydney Williams.

At the beginning of Series 5, set three months after the birth, Rachel appears overprotective of Matthew; she refuses to let Adam hold him and never lets him out of her sight. After Adam abruptly leaves Matthew's naming ceremony, feeling unable to love his child because he is coming between him and his wife, Rachel reveals that the baby fell off the kitchen table when she left him unattended for a matter of seconds. Baxendale said of the story, "Rachel's take on motherhood is quite real in my experience because she's had such trouble conceiving for a start and then all the problems with the birth [...] She becomes obsessed with the baby and excludes Adam from everything. They have to work hard to resolve their differences and there is a big transition. I can see why she behaves the way she does—you do become over-protective with a baby. It's amazing what your body does to you and the instincts that suddenly take over. Being a mum myself, I have got real empathy with Rachel." However, Observer television reviewer Kathryn Flett criticised the plot as unrealistic:

As an obsessive new mother who has spent many an hour hovering over my son with a thermometer and a pre-emptive bottle of Calpol, Rachel's contention that she didn't want to go out for dinner with Adam because she couldn't bear to leave three-month-old Matthew in the care of their best friend's children's nanny was just one niggling implausibility too far. After three months of being on baby duty 24 hours a day, every woman I've ever come across has, ordinary guilt aside, all but wept with joy at the prospect of a bowl of pasta and a glass of wine consumed somewhere other than Babyville. None of which would matter a jot, of course, had Cold Feet not been feted for reflecting the lives of its target audience.

After her revelation to Adam, Rachel is more willing to leave Matthew in some else's care; after her maternity leave ends and she returns to work, Adam looks after Matthew during his period of unemployment. When they discover their rented house is being put up for sale, Rachel and Adam find the perfect family home to buy. As Rachel drives to the auction, her car, a Saab 900, is hit by a highway maintenance truck. She is taken to hospital for emergency treatment but dies later that night. A church funeral service is held for her and her ashes are scattered in Portmeirion, the location being where Adam states Matthew was conceived. Although the character dies in the penultimate episode, Baxendale appears in the final episode as an apparition of Rachel. Baxendale believed the character was being punished by divine retribution for the "terrible sin" of terminating her pregnancy.

In 2011, Baxendale told Digital Spy that she had been involved in discussions with Cold Feet's creative staff about how to incorporate Rachel into a possible revival of the series.

== Reception ==
For her performance in the pilot episode, Helen Baxendale was nominated for Top TV Comedy Actress at the British Comedy Awards 1997. At the Broadcasting Press Guild Awards 1998, she was presented with the Best Actress award, for her performance in Cold Feet and An Unsuitable Job for a Woman. Her portrayal received mixed reviews from television critics when the series began. In the Daily Record, Kathleen Morgan wrote that Baxendale had lost her edge since playing Dr Maitland in Cardiac Arrest; "Instead of making a triumphant return to British television as a tough-talking woman, she has been cast as another spineless character." Sara Villiers wrote in The Scotsman, "Rachel is so unfeasibly bland and nice that she has consigned Baxendale to the title Most Irritating Woman on the Telly."

The plot of Rachel's infertility was analysed on an episode of BBC Radio 4's Woman's Hour. Ann Furedi of the British Pregnancy Advisory Service, which had supplied information to the writing team during the research stages, stated that there had not been a recorded case of Asherman's syndrome in the United Kingdom since the second world war. Further to that, she stated that the consensus among medical groups was that there was no real direct link between abortions and infertility; rather an untreated infection could increase the chances of fertility problems if it interfered with an abortion. Christine Geraghty, then senior lecturer in film and TV at Goldsmiths College, countered that the factual accuracy of the storyline depended on how the producers wanted to portray the issue to viewers. Her opinion was backed up by an ITV statement, which said that "stories for Cold Feet are not just chosen in order to make people aware of the issues involved; they're also chosen for their dramatic potential and relevance to modern living". Woman's Hour presenter Jenni Murray developed the discussion in an article for The Guardian; she mentioned that no impression was given that Rachel had suffered an incorrectly performed operation or had had to travel to eastern Europe for it, and that it was improbable that Rachel managed to conceive a child after all.

Critics were retrospective of both Rachel and of Baxendale's performance when the series ended. In the New Statesman, Andrew Billen wrote that Rachel "was as near to a sex symbol as this comedy drama about six cold-footed yuppies produced. She was also materialistic, unfaithful, self-absorbed, tricky and had not the first clue about men [...] Yet her death, caused by a moment of carelessness behind the wheel, was powerful and shocking, a tribute to the extent to which we have invested and believed in her." Observer critic Kathryn Flett noted that Baxendale's high-profile role in Friends made her the "star" of Cold Feet in the first series, but both she and Rachel had been "eclipsed" by the other actors and characters by the time of the final series. Spectator critic Simon Hoggart wrote, "I wasn't as sorry about poor old Rachel as I should have been. It was one of those deaths which makes you think, 'Oh, her poor baby boy,' rather than 'Goodness, how we'll miss her.'" Hoggart attributed his ambivalence to Baxendale's portrayal of the character as a "fraught, snippy" woman. Matt Greenhalgh, who co-wrote the episode featuring Rachel's death, called killing off the character "a privilege".

Tesco Personal Finance recorded a 20% increase in people taking out life insurance policies, which a spokesman attributed to the accident scenes being "portrayed in such a dramatic and realistic way". Following the broadcast of the final episode, Portmeirion information services received 50 requests for wedding packs, at a time when three weddings a week were being held there.

The character's death was and continues to be ranked in public polls of various opinions. It was voted Best Drama Moment on the BBC's annual TV Moments broadcast in 2004. The same year, a poll conducted for National Pub Week ranked the scene where a barman scoops some of Rachel's ashes into a bucket the fifth best of various pub-related television scenes. In 2008, the death was ranked at number three in Sky One's 50 Greatest TV Endings programme. In a 2010 public poll to promote Freeview HD, Rachel's death was ranked as the seventh most emotional TV moment. In 2011, Rachel's wedding to Adam was placed at number nine in Channel 5's Greatest TV Weddings programme. Colin McAllister opined that every woman's heart broke when they married.

== Bibliography ==
- Smith, Rupert (2003). Cold Feet: The Complete Companion. London: Granada Media. ISBN 978-0-233-00999-5.
- Tibballs, Geoff (2000). Cold Feet: The Best Bits…. London: Granada Media. ISBN 978-0-233-99924-1.
