= Life Begins (TV series) =

2004–2006 British drama TV series

- Created by: Mike Bullen
- Starring: Caroline Quentin; Alexander Armstrong; Elliot Henderson Boyle; Ace Destiny Ryan; Anne Reid; Frank Finlay
- Country of origin: United Kingdom
- Original language: English
- No. of series: 3
- No. of episodes: 19

Production
- Executive producers: Andy Harries; Mike Bullen
- Producers: John Chapman (Series 1–2); Emma Benson (Series 3); Mark Hudson (Series 3)
- Editors: Paul Machliss; Simon Reglar; Chris Barwell; Clive Barrett; David Blackmore
- Running time: 60 minutes
- Production company: Granada Television

Original release
- Network: ITV
- Release: 16 February 2004 – 9 October 2006

Life Begins is a British television drama first broadcast on ITV between 16 February 2004 and 9 October 2006, starring Caroline Quentin and Alexander Armstrong, Anne Reid and Frank Finlay.

== Premise ==
The story focuses on Philip Raymond (Phil) Mee and Margaret Eileen Brenda (Maggie) Thornhill-Mee and how their lives, plus those of their two children, James and Rebecca, change when Phil announces he is leaving Maggie for another woman. The first series follows Maggie's struggle to cope with adapting to single life, including finding a job, and later a new boyfriend, with the tables later turned on Phil somewhat when his new relationship fails. The series also features various friends and relatives of the couple and their dramas, such as the struggles of Maggie's parents, Eric and Brenda.

== History ==
The first series of Life Begins began on 16 February 2004. The first series was a success. The show managed viewing figures ranging from 9.51 to 10.45 million, winning all of its time-slots. The series has been aired on Channel Seven in Australia and TV ONE in New Zealand.

As the first Life Begins was so popular, a second series was launched, which began on 16 February 2005. Series two received strong ratings of 6.38 to 8.62 million.

A third series started on 4 September 2006 on ITV. Again, the viewing figures were still high, managing to win half of its timeslots with figures of 5.79 to 6.32 million.

Life Begins was inspired by Bullen's re-evaluation of the lives of people around him as they approached 40 years old. The series was designed as a vehicle for actress Sarah Lancashire, who had signed an exclusive "Golden handcuffs" deal with ITV. Two months after the series was announced, Lancashire pulled out, feeling unable to commit to a potentially long-running series. ITV replaced Lancashire with Caroline Quentin. Bullen wrote the series with John Forte. As with Cold Feet, he integrated events from his own life into the storylines. He researched Maggie's travel agency job by spending a week at a travel agents' in Bristol.

It was always intended by the writers that the third series would be the last. A fourth series, thought possible at the time, never materialised.

== Cast ==
- Caroline Quentin as Maggie Mee
- Alexander Armstrong as Phil Mee
- Elliot Henderson-Boyle as James Mee
- Ace Ryan as Rebecca Mee
- Anne Reid as Brenda Thornhill
- Frank Finlay as Eric Thornhill
- Claire Skinner as Clare
- Stuart McQuarrie as Guy
- Ellie Haddington as Kathleen
- Sarah Ozeke as Karen
- Jordan El-Balawi as Freddie
- Roy Dotrice as Frank
- Alan Williams as George
- Naomi Allisstone as Anna
- Nicholas Boulton as Kieron
- Chloe Howman as Helen
- Paul Thornley as Jeff
- Danny Webb as Paul
- Abby Ford as Samantha
- Brian Little as Jim
- Michelle Holmes as Genevieve
- Finlay Robertson as Kevin
- David Westhead as Brian
- Suzanne Burden as Penny
- Laura Patch as Tina
- Alexandra Gilbreath as Mia
- Matthew Cottle as Nick
- Jon Newman as Simon
- Lewis Rose as Tom
- Kelly Hunter as Mrs Lane

== Music ==
The music played over the "next time" clip and the credits is the specially produced "Life Begins Mix" of the Faithless song "No Roots", from their album of the same name released in June 2004, four months after Life Begins began, meaning the song was debuted on the show in this version. Faithless' Sister Bliss provided other music for the series.

== Episodes ==
=== Series overview ===
Series	Episodes	Originally released	
Series	Episodes	First released	Last released
1	6	16 February 2004	22 March 2004
2	7	16 February 2005	30 March 2005
3	6	4 September 2006	9 October 2006

=== Series 1 (2004) ===
No.	Title	Directed by	Written by	Original release date	UK viewers (millions)
1	"Maggie & Phil"	Catherine Morshead	Mike Bullen	16 February 2004	10.45
While wife and husband Maggie and Phil Mee are on holiday with friends Clare and Guy, Phil decides that he wants to leave Maggie. Soon after, he moves out and finds a flat of his own. Now Maggie must cope on her own with her two children.
2	"Maggie, Brenda & Eric"	Catherine Morshead	Mike Bullen	23 February 2004	9.51
Maggie finds a job at a travel agency. To Maggie's displeasure, her husband Phil arrives to book a holiday for him and his new girlfriend Anna. Meanwhile Maggie learns that her father has some serious problems with his memory.
3	"Maggie, Kathleen & Sam"	Catherine Morshead	Mike Bullen	1 March 2004	9.84
Phil and Maggie are forced to see a mediator to sort out their assets. But Phil is being less than honest about his earnings, so Maggie threatens to contact the Child Support Agency. She also goes out with her work friends, waking up the next morning with a young man.
4	"Maggie, Clare & Guy"	Charles Palmer	John Forte	8 March 2004	9.62
As a result of the previous night, Maggie is embarrassed about asking for the morning-after pill. Her work friends decide to send her on a blind date. She starts to spend a lot of time with friend Guy which causes Clare to become suspicious. Meanwhile Anna has moved in with Maggie's husband Phil, causing Maggie to become extremely angry.
5	"Maggie & Helen"	Charles Palmer	John Forte	15 March 2004	9.83
Maggie decides to go speed dating with colleague Helen which ends in a total catastrophe. But Phil didn't like the idea of Maggie going speed dating, consequently he becomes frustrated. But soon after, her son James's history teacher Paul Winston takes an unexpected interest in Maggie.
6	"Maggie & Paul"	Charles Palmer	Mike Bullen	22 March 2004	9.99
Maggie begins a relationship with Paul. A situation arises where things become very awkward as Phil turns up with the children after having a row with girlfriend Anna, causing them to split up. Now Maggie must decide which man she wants to be with, her husband who left her with two children, or her new boyfriend.

=== Series 2 (2005) ===
No.	Title	Directed by	Written by	Original release date	UK viewers (millions)
7	"Things Are Changing"	Catherine Morshead	Mike Bullen	16 February 2005	8.62
The travel agency Maggie works for takes over another branch. As a result, Genevieve and Kevin join the staff. At Phil's work however, cuts are being made by his ex-girlfriend Anna. Friend to Maggie and Phil: Guy decides to expand his business. Meanwhile Maggie's dad gives a talk at a local school on his wartime memories.
8	"From the Past"	Catherine Morshead	Mike Bullen	23 February 2005	7.44
Maggie has been made the deputy at the travel agency, however, she doesn't seem to be getting along with colleague Genevieve. Brenda, Maggie's mum has an old flame re-enter her life and Rebecca's new boyfriend is not approved of. Phil starts depending on Maggie in fear that his redundancy is looming
9	"Time Goes By"	Catherine Morshead	Mike Bullen	2 March 2005	7.90
When Maggie comforts Phil, their friend Guy gets the wrong idea and misunderstands their situation. Maggie also discovers why Genevieve is constantly late for work, she reveals to Maggie that she is the single mum to an autistic child. Meanwhile Maggie and Paul can't seem to get any time alone with each other.
10	"Under Pressure"	David Caffrey	John Forte	9 March 2005	6.99
Even though Maggie is separated from her husband, he seems to be spending more time at home than ever, although, boyfriend Paul doesn't seem to notice or get irritated at all. Oddly Maggie shows empathy towards Phil's circumstances. However, to resolve the situation, Phil is now moving into Paul's old flat while Paul moves in with Maggie in order to spend more time with her.
11	"Break for Love"	David Caffrey	John Forte	16 March 2005	6.93
Maggie becomes aware of the strain her mother Brenda is under while trying to cope with her husband Eric who has Alzheimer's. Maggie suggests that he comes to stay while Brenda goes away for a weekend. But Brenda doesn't go away with friend Nancy like Maggie thinks. She's away with old flame Frank. Clare consults Maggie about her spending so much time with Phil.
12	"Hidden Pain"	David Caffrey	John Forte	23 March 2005	7.76
With Rebecca feeling annoyed with her mum and breaking up with her boyfriend, she feels a huge strain and decides to go next door to talk with Samantha. But while Rebecca is there, she takes some pills and is rushed to hospital. Her dad Phil is furious and takes it out on Paul who was meant to look after her.
13	"When Lives Collide"	Charles Palmer	Mike Bullen	30 March 2005	6.38
Maggie plans a big Christmas holiday for her family and friends, including Paul, her children, her parents, and friends Clare and Guy. But Phil thinks that he and Maggie still have a chance together. Meanwhile Paul gets a visit from his ex-wife Paula.

=== Series 3 (2006) ===
No.	Title	Directed by	Written by	Original release date	UK viewers (millions)
14	Episode 1	Jeremy Webb	Mike Bullen	4 September 2006	6.17
Maggie makes a fresh start with Phil in a new house. However, Maggie still doesn't feel comfortable with her current relationship with Phil. Phil's boss Brian arrives unexpectedly to stay with them as his wife Penny has thrown him out of their home. Meanwhile Maggie and Phil have an awkward misunderstanding with their new next door neighbours, Mia and Nick the swingers, mistake Maggie and Phil for being swingers as well. The misunderstanding gets them laughing again.
15	Episode 2	Jeremy Webb	Mike Bullen	11 September 2006	5.79
Phil wants Maggie to give up her job at the travel agents in order to help James with his schoolwork, as they fear that James may fail his GCSE exams again. To the surprise of her colleagues Maggie hands in her notice, but she has second thoughts when Penny reveals that Phil and Brian were seen at a lap-dancing club. Meanwhile Penny invites Brian home, but to sleep in the garage and not in the house like Brian had previously thought.
16	Episode 3	Jeremy Webb	Andy Watts	18 September 2006	6.32
Maggie grows more concerned about her relationship with Phil. She thinks that he's having an affair with a new client. Maggie has second thoughts about going away for her work weekend as her main priority is trying to resolve her current situation. Finally she decides to go on the weekend but rings home to check-up on Phil. His new client answers making Maggie livid and reinforcing her thoughts that Phil is betraying her again. Phil arrives at Maggie's hotel, but was not having an affair. They now realize that they have serious issues to deal with.
17	Episode 4	Martin Dennis	Andy Watts	25 September 2006	5.91
Mia, Maggie's next door neighbour suggest that Maggie and Phil try something different. Maggie starts Spanish classes and goes out for a meal with them. But Phil wasn't interested in doing either showing no support towards Maggie. while out, she gets talking to an ex-cancer patient Will, which prompts her to think about travelling. Later on Maggie ends up looking after her colleagues baby which gives Phil the idea that having a baby would save his and Maggie's marriage. Maggie isn't convinced however.
18	Episode 5	Martin Dennis	Mike Bullen	2 October 2006	6.16
Maggie finds out that she is actually pregnant. She goes to the abortion clinic but she can't go through with the termination or break the news about the baby to Phil. Later on she collapses at work and is rushed to hospital where she loses the baby. Meanwhile, Phil is sacked from his job by his boss Brian. Having talked to next door neighbour Nick, Phil sets up his own business at home, taking on Penny as his first customer. while at the travel agency, Jeff introduces the new regional manager who was the father of Genevieve's child, that left them fend for themselves.
19	Episode 6	Martin Dennis	Mike Bullen	9 October 2006	6.32
With Maggie having decided to go travelling with friend Will, it turns out he cannot go. Mia and Nick have more disagreements, as a result, Nick moves out and their house is put up for sale. Meanwhile Maggie's parents cannot find a suitable house in which to move, so Phil has an idea for Brenda and Eric to move into the house next door. It is decided that Phil will go travelling with Maggie to South America instead of Will, while Mia looks after James and Rebecca.

== Broadcast ==
=== UK air dates ===
- Series One - 16 February 2004 to 22 March 2004
- Series Two - 16 February 2005 to 30 March 2005
- Series Three - 4 September 2006 to 9 October 2006

From June 2014, the show was repeated on ITV Encore, a channel exclusive to Sky customers, which closed down in 2018.

=== International air dates ===
Country	TV network(s)	Series premiere	Weekly schedule
Australia	Channel Seven	5 December 2006; 7 August 2007	Series One: Tuesday 8:30pm (Dec 2006 – Jan 2007); Series Two: Tuesday 9:30pm (Aug–Sep 2007); Series Three: Tuesday 10:30pm (Feb–Mar 2008)
New Zealand	TV ONE		
Canada	Vision TV	29 November 2004; 6 November 2006	
Netherlands	VARA	Series One and Two: 6 May 2005; Series Three: 24 June 2008	

Ratings in Australia: The first episode of the first series aired over Australia's non ratings period, and the opening episode rated 1.1 million mainland capital city viewers, which was the 12th most watched show for the week. Ratings continued around the one million viewers mark throughout series one. The first episode of series two moved to 9:30pm and rated 998,000 viewers, ranking first in its time slot. The second episode rated 853,000 viewers.
