= Christine Langan =

English film producer (born 1965)

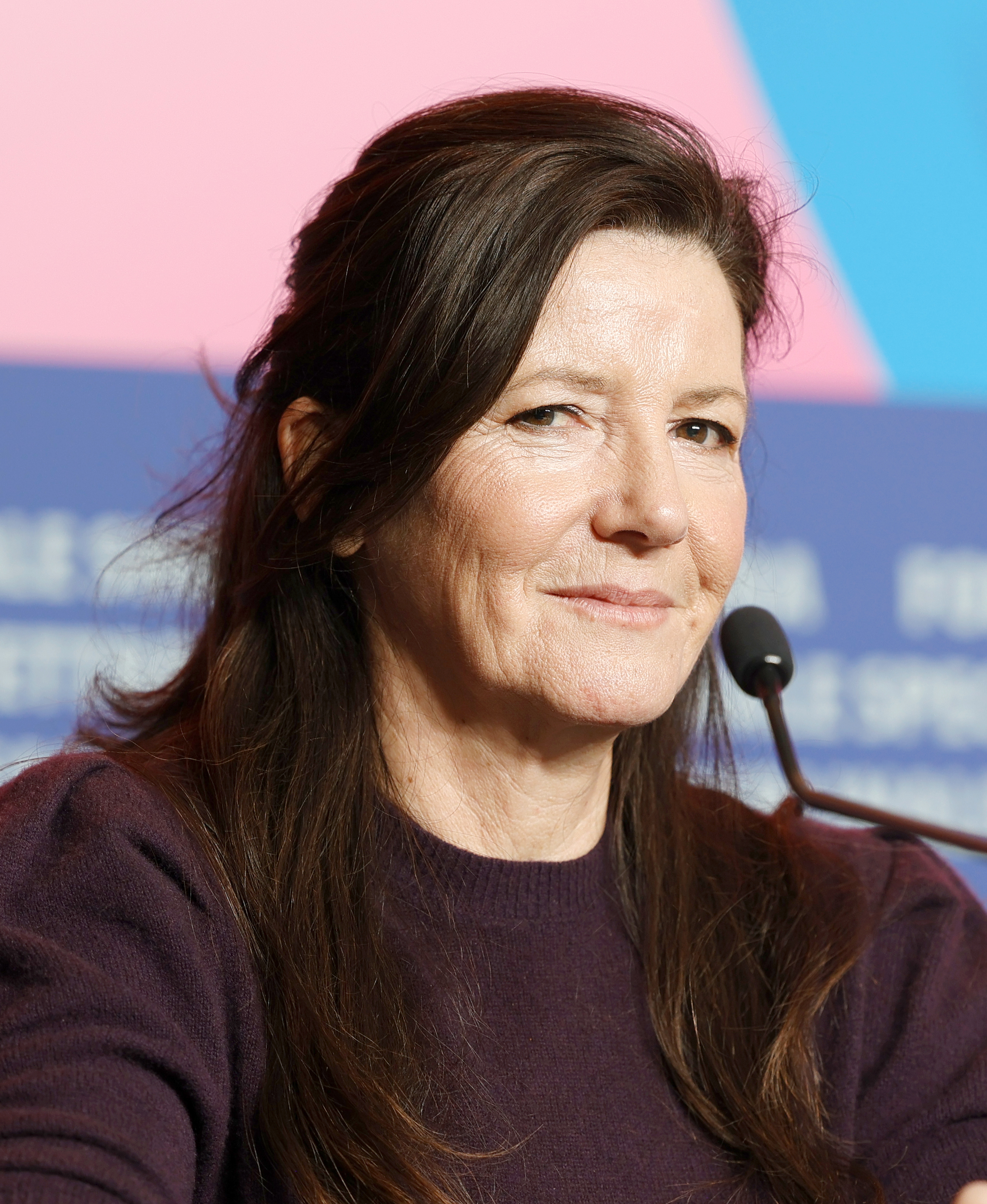
- Langan in 2025
- Born: January 1965 (age 61); Edmonton, London, England
- Occupation: Head of BBC Films
- Years active: 1990–present

Christine Langan (born January 1965) is an English film producer who was appointed Head of BBC Films in 2009. In 2016, she left the role to become CEO of comedy television production company Baby Cow Productions.

After graduating from Cambridge University in 1987 and working in advertising for three years, Langan joined Granada Television's drama serials department where she served as a script editor for daytime soap operas. She later transferred to Granada's newly created comedy department, where she developed the acclaimed television series Cold Feet, and other one-off comedies. In 2000, she left Granada to become a freelance producer and produced the romantic comedy series Rescue Me for the BBC. She returned to Granada in 2002, producing acclaimed dramas such as The Deal (2003) and Dirty Filthy Love (2004). She made her feature film production debut on Pierrepoint (2005), earning a Carl Foreman Award nomination at the 60th British Academy Film Awards. Langan also produced The Queen (2006) for Granada, which won the BAFTA Award for Best Film and was nominated for the Academy Award for Best Picture.

In 2006, Langan became an executive producer at BBC Films, developing features such as The Other Boleyn Girl (2008) and The Duchess (2008). In April 2009, she was appointed Creative Director of BBC Films, giving her control of a £12 million annual budget and which projects are commissioned for development. By 2010, Langan had led BBC Films to a record 13 nominations at the British Academy Film Awards, which included In the Loop (2009), Fish Tank (2009) and An Education (2009).

Langan lives in London with her partner, the writer Christian Spurrier, and their two children.

== Background ==
Christine Langan was born in January 1965 in Edmonton, London, England. Her mother and father, a dinner lady and a bricklayer respectively, already had three children. Growing up, Langan became interested in television production after seeing Lew Grade's name in the credits of several programmes. She attended a Catholic grammar school and read English at Gonville and Caius College, Cambridge.

After graduating from Cambridge University in 1987, Langan spent three years working as a copywriter for an advertising company. She also contributed film reviews to BBC Radio 2's Cinema 2 programme. In 1990, Langan began her career in film production as an assistant developer for Tessa Ross at British Screen. The following year, she responded to an advertisement for a script editor at Granada Television's drama serials department, located in Manchester. She was hired by David Liddiment, and worked mainly on Granada's daytime soap operas.

== Career ==
=== Granada comedy ===
In 1993, Langan returned to London to work for Andy Harries at Granada's newly created comedy department, where she script-edited September Song, the television adaptation of An Evening with Gary Lineker, and the second series of Rik Mayall Presents. In 1995, she was associate producer on The Perfect Match, a one-off comedy drama written by former BBC radio producer Mike Bullen. The Perfect Match was broadcast in September 1995, and shortly afterwards, Harries asked Langan to develop more ideas from Bullen.

They devised Cold Feet, another one-off comedy drama based on the love lives of Bullen himself and his friends. Langan produced Cold Feet, guiding Bullen through his script drafts, and hiring Father Ted director Declan Lowney to shoot it. Cold Feet was broadcast in March 1997 as one of four Comedy Premieres on ITV (two others of which Langan script edited). It received poor ratings and little critical reaction. However, in May 1997, it won the Rose d'Or at the Montreux International Television Festival. ITV Network Centre commissioned a series of Cold Feet in August, which Langan also produced. For the series, Langan tried to achieve a written and visual style that differed from regular sitcoms by avoiding "one-liners and quick laughs" and hiring directors who had done little television work before. Cold Feet premiered as a series in November 1998, and Langan stayed until the third series in 2000. She and Bullen received a nomination for the British Academy Television Award for Best Drama Series in 2000. Also in 1998, Langan worked on her first feature film, script editing the Parker Posey-led The Misadventures of Margaret.

In 1999, Langan was made an executive producer in the department. She oversaw several productions, including Passion Killers (1999, starring Ben Miller), Safe as Houses (2000, starring Ricky Tomlinson), and the pilot episode of David Nicholls' I Saw You (2000, starring Paul Rhys and Fay Ripley). In 2000, Langan was offered a position at the BBC's drama department, which had been rearranged that year. The trade magazine Broadcast reported the BBC had made a "substantial offer" to her. Granada's director of programmes Grant Mansfield countered the BBC's bid by offering Langan the position of deputy controller of drama, operating under Andy Harries, who had recently been appointed controller of the same department. Langan accepted neither offer, and instead became a freelance producer after her contract with Granada expired.

As a freelancer, Langan developed three more episodes of I Saw You for Granada. Her only other project was producing David Nicholls' romantic comedy series Rescue Me with Tiger Aspect Productions for BBC One. As well as producing it, she made her credited directorial debut on the final episode. The six-part series, starring Sally Phillips, was broadcast in 2002. It was not a ratings success, and the BBC did not commission a second series.

=== Granada drama ===
In September 2002, Langan signed a new contract to develop new projects at Granada's combined drama, film and comedy department. Her first production was the romantic comedy television film Watermelon, starring Anna Friel. At the end of 2002, she began developing Peter Morgan's The Deal, a dramatisation of the political rise of Tony Blair and Gordon Brown. Although initially giving full backing, the ITV network backed out during pre-production. Channel 4 picked up the film from Granada, and it was broadcast in September 2003. The Deal was presented with the British Academy Television Award for Best Single Drama in 2004. The same year, she produced the one-off drama Dirty Filthy Love, which was also nominated for the BAFTA for Best Single Drama.

In 2005, Langan's feature debut Pierrepoint was released at major film festivals. Based on the life of British hangman Albert Pierrepoint (played by Timothy Spall), Pierrepoint got Langan a nomination for the Carl Foreman Award for Most Promising Newcomer at the 60th British Academy Film Awards in 2007. 2006 saw the theatrical release of The Queen, a feature film follow-up to The Deal, that focused on the impact the death of Diana, Princess of Wales had on Tony Blair and Queen Elizabeth II. Michael Sheen reprised his role as Tony Blair from The Deal, and Helen Mirren played Elizabeth. The film was produced by Granada in co-operation with the ITV network, and was released in late 2006 to critical acclaim. In 2007, it won the BAFTA Award for Best Film and was nominated for the Academy Award for Best Picture. Of Langan's work on Pierrepoint and The Queen, a Variety writer said, "both pics are a tribute to her tactful skill at working with tricky but talented writers and directors to take stories that could easily have been confined to the small screen and give them real cinematic depth and breadth".

=== BBC Films ===
In September 2006, Langan made a low-key departure from Granada to take up a position as an executive producer with BBC Films. Although approached to join BBC Films some years before, only in 2007 did she feel it was the time to "concentrate more exclusively on film". She immediately began overseeing editing work on The Other Boleyn Girl, which was already in post-production. She also began developing The Damned United, a film based on David Peace's novel that fictionalised the 44 days Brian Clough managed Leeds United F.C. in 1974. The film was adapted by Peter Morgan, executive produced by Andy Harries, and starred Michael Sheen as Clough. On why she continues to work with the same people on her projects, Langan said, "The reason I return to working with the same people is that you have invested time, energy and thought and care into these relationships and that can pay dividends—The Queen is an example of those relationships paying dividends".

Following David M. Thompson's announcement that he would be retiring from the post of head of BBC Films in September 2007, Langan was widely expected to take over his duties. Confirmation was made the following month when she was appointed Commissioning Editor of the company, taking over the day-to-day duties of BBC Films and reporting to Jane Tranter, the Controller of Fiction at the BBC. When Tranter transferred to a BBC Worldwide position in Los Angeles in 2009, the BBC decided not to fill the Controller of Fiction vacancy with a single person. Instead, the responsibilities were divided between four people; Langan became Creative Director of BBC Films, responsible for "editorial strategy and commissioning", and also joined the BBC Fiction board.

By 2010, Langan was overseeing a £12 million annual budget at BBC Films, and had executive produced high-profile films such as In the Loop (Armando Iannucci, 2009), Fish Tank (Andrea Arnold, 2009), and An Education (Lone Scherfig, 2009). BBC Films received 13 nomination at the 63rd British Academy Film Awards, described in the London Evening Standard as a record number. In 2010, Langan also executive produced The Special Relationship—the final part of Peter Morgan's "Blair trilogy"—and StreetDance, the first British feature film to be made in 3D. The Guardian recognised Langan's achievements at BBC Films by ranking her at number 36 in its inaugural Film Power 100 list in September 2010.

Through 2011, Langan executive produced Ralph Fiennes' directorial debut Coriolanus, the Marilyn Monroe biopic My Week with Marilyn, and Lynne Ramsay's adaptation of Lionel Shriver's novel We Need to Talk About Kevin. The project was in development hell since 2007 until Langan realised BBC Films was trying to get too big a budget to make it with. Ramsay rewrote the script in 2010 to allow a lower budget.

== Filmography ==
Television and films produced
Year(s)	Title	Role	Description
1993	Rik Mayall Presents	Script editor	1 series of television series
1993	September Song	Script editor	1 series of television series
1994	An Evening with Gary Lineker	Script editor	Television film
1994	A Different Way Home	Script editor	1 series of television series
1995	The Perfect Match	Assistant producer	Television film
1996	True Love	Script editor	Television pilot
1997	Comedy Premieres: Cold Feet	Producer	Television pilot
1997	Comedy Premieres: The Grimleys	Script editor	Television pilot
1997	Comedy Premieres: King Leek	Script editor	Television pilot
1998	The Misadventures of Margaret	Script editor	Feature film
1998–2000	Cold Feet	Producer/Executive producer	3 series of television series
1999	Passion Killers	Executive producer	Television pilot
2000	Safe as Houses	Executive producer	Television film
2000	I Saw You	Executive producer	Television pilot
2002	I Saw You	Executive producer	3-part television series
2002	Rescue Me	Producer; Director	1 series of television series; 1 episode: Series 1, Episode 6
2003	Watermelon	Executive producer	Television film
2003	The Deal	Executive producer	Television film
2004	Dirty Filthy Love	Executive producer	Television film
2004	Lie With Me	Executive producer	2-part television serial
2005	Pierrepoint	Producer	Feature film
2006	The Queen	Producer	Feature film
2008	The Duchess	Executive producer	Feature film
2008	The Boy in the Striped Pyjamas	Executive producer	Feature film
2009	Is Anybody There?	Executive producer	Feature film
2009	The Damned United	Executive producer	Feature film
2009	In the Loop	Executive producer	Feature film
2009	Bright Star	Executive producer	Feature film
2009	Fish Tank	Executive producer	Feature film
2010	StreetDance	Executive producer	Feature film
2010	The Special Relationship	Executive producer	Television film with territorial theatrical release
2010	Tamara Drewe	Executive producer	Feature film
2010	Africa United	Executive producer	Feature film
2010	Made in Dagenham	Executive producer	Feature film
2011	Jane Eyre	Executive producer	Feature film
2011	Coriolanus	Executive producer	Feature film
2011	We Need to Talk About Kevin	Executive producer	Feature film
2011	Page Eight	Executive producer	Television film
2011	My Week with Marilyn	Executive producer	Feature film
2011	360	Executive producer	Feature film
2012	Now Is Good	Executive producer	Feature film
2013	Alan Partridge is in Alpha Papa	Executive producer	Feature film
2013	Saving Mr. Banks	Executive producer	Feature film
TBA	Chivalry	Executive producer	Television series

== Awards and nominations ==
Year	Award	Category	Title	Result
1999	British Academy Television Award	Best Drama Series	Cold Feet	Nominated
2003	British Academy Television Award	Best Single Drama	The Deal	Won
2004	British Academy Television Award	Best Single Drama	Dirty Filthy Love	Nominated
2006	British Academy Film Award	Carl Foreman Award for Most Promising Newcomer	Pierrepoint	Nominated
2006	British Academy Film Award	Best Film	The Queen	Won
2006	British Academy Film Award	Alexander Korda Award for Best British Film	The Queen	Nominated
2006	Academy Award	Best Picture	The Queen	Nominated
2006	Producers Guild of America Award	Best Film	The Queen	Nominated

Langan was made Honorary Associate of London Film School.
