= Mike Bullen =

English TV screenwriter

- Born: Michael J. Bullen; 13 January 1960 (age 66); Bramhall, Cheshire, England, UK
- Occupation: Screenwriter
- Spouse: Lisa
- Children: 2
- Writing career
- Period: 1994–present
- Genres: Comedy, drama
- Notable works: Cold Feet (1997–2003, 2016–2020), Life Begins (2004–2006)
- Notable awards: Writers' Guild of Great Britain award for New Writer of the Year (1997); British Academy Television Award for Best Drama Series (2002); British Comedy Award for Writer of the Year (2003)

Michael J. Bullen (born 13 January 1960) is an English screenwriter best known for creating the Granada Television series Cold Feet, which won him the Writer of the Year award at the 2003 British Comedy Awards. He wrote two more series for Granada; Life Begins, which ran for three series, and All About George, which ran for one series. His works have been described as being "about the intricacies of interpersonal relationships and what happens when they break down".

Bullen moved with his wife and two children to Australia in 2002. Two years later he directed his first short film, Amorality Tale. He co-created the Australian–UK television series Tripping Over in 2006 and the writer and director of the Australian television pilot Make or Break in 2007. He returned to producing work for British television in 2010 with the BBC pilot Reunited, and moved back to the UK in 2011.

== Background ==
Bullen was born in Bramhall, Cheshire. Bullen's father, Alex, was a chemical engineer, and his mother, Joan, was a housewife. Mike and his sister Jane were raised in Solihull, where he attended Solihull School. At the age of 18 he was accepted to Magdalene College, Cambridge, to read economics. He did not enjoy the subject, so switched to history of art. His first experiences of writing came when he was a child and wrote a newspaper for his neighbours. At Cambridge, he dramatised a Johann Wolfgang von Goethe novel.

Following his graduation, Bullen began a career as a media planner buyer for an advertising company. The job did not excite him and he has described it as "pretty pointless". He quit the job to go backpacking in south-east Asia. On his return he applied for a position as a radio producer at Radio Netherlands Worldwide, having previously worked for a hospital radio. He eventually began freelance work for the BBC World Service, where he was a presenter and producer for the magazine programmes On Screen and Outlook.

== Career ==
=== 1994–1997 ===
In 1994, aged 34, Bullen began thinking about writing a television script, based on the idea that he could "write crap" on television. He was inspired in particular by the American television series Hill Street Blues (a show he "cancelled [his] social life for") and Thirtysomething. He began work on scripts for Pie in the Sky and Soldier Soldier but did not complete either. To improve his writing skills, he took a writing course at the National Film and Television School, a comedy course by Anji Loman Field, and attended Robert McKee's STORY seminar.

He began writing another script, this time drawing on his American television influences. Believing that there was nothing on British television for people in his age group that was not a soap opera or a costume drama, Bullen wrote a script entitled The Perfect Match, about a man who proposes to his girlfriend using the screen at Wembley Stadium during the FA Cup Final. He secured an agent, who managed to sell the script on spec to Andy Harries, controller of comedy at Granada Television. Harries described the writing as "impressive—cleverly constructed dialogue, very funny, well observed" and commissioned it as part of his drive to move away from making traditional-style sitcoms. Bullen described the moment he walked onto the set of The Perfect Match as "gobsmacking [...] wandering around a room which had previously only existed in my head". It was broadcast on ITV in September 1995 to poor reviews.

Harries was pleased enough with Bullen's work to ask him to pitch some more ideas to The Perfect Match assistant producer Christine Langan, who shared Bullen's desire to see more television directed at their age bracket. Bullen pitched the idea of a traditional "boy-meets-girl, boy-loses-girl, boy-wins-girl-back" story told from both sides of the relationship but using elements of fantasy and flashback to distort events to fit a character's point of view. Harries accepted the pitch and Bullen began work on Cold Feet. Initially commissioned as a pilot for ITV's Comedy Premieres programming strand, the prospect of a full television series was given to Bullen. Cold Feet's main character, Adam Williams, a lothario character and a serial monogamist, was based on Bullen himself during his twenties. The other main character, Rachel Bradley, was based on a combination of his ex-girlfriends and the "ideal girlfriend". Harries suggested that if a series were to be commissioned, more characters would be needed. Bullen developed a supporting cast for Cold Feet, basing each character on friends of his. The script for Cold Feet went through "six or seven" drafts before being filmed in 1996 and was broadcast in 1997. After a hiatus, it was commissioned for a full series. During the hiatus, he wrote a romantic comedy feature film script for Granada and developed a pilot for London Weekend Television, neither of which were picked up. The Writers' Guild of Great Britain presented to Bullen the award for New Writer of the Year at their awards ceremony in October 1997.

When he first started writing professionally, Bullen could not structure his scripting in a coherent way, adopting a "mix and match" method; he began by structuring a script on cards, then typing what he had onto a computer, then returning to the cards. After completing the Cold Feet pilot, he starting writing ten pages of script per day, regardless of the quality of the writing. His own third draft was usually submitted to producers as the "first draft".

=== 1998–2003 ===
Production on the first series of Cold Feet began in January 1998. Bullen continued his method of developing storylines based on his life; he and his wife had their first child in the latter half of 1997 and he integrated their experiences into the storyline of characters Pete and Jenny, who have their first child in Cold Feet's first episode. Throughout 1998, he retained his job at the BBC, working on three radio shows per week at the same time as writing Cold Feet. During the second series he cut back to one show per week. By the time of the third series in 2000, he felt confident enough that he would have a future in television that he was able to give up radio presenting. He moved from his home in London to Cambridge, where he was able to write for two full days a week, at evenings and weekends.

He worked on other projects at the same time as Cold Feet: After watching the 1997 docusoap Holiday Reps, he became interested in what happens in the personal lives of holiday representatives while in foreign countries. Out of this idea he developed Sunburn for BBC One. Sunburn starred Michelle Collins and was broadcast for two series from 1999 to 2000. Bullen shared writing duties with Lizzie Mickery and Sally Wainwright. His inspiration from American television continued; following the premiere of The West Wing in 1999, he began outlining a British version, The Firm, that would be set in Buckingham Palace. The project never moved beyond planning stages because Bullen believed that British political issues such as "cod wars with Spain" are not as "sexy" as the issues covered in The West Wing.

In 1999, Cold Feet was adapted into a series of the same name for American network NBC. He wrote the screenplay for one of the pilot episodes. At the same time, NBC and Granada Entertainment USA commissioned a pilot script from Bullen entitled Small Beer, which centred on a group of people who take over a microbrewery in the north-western United States.

The third series of Cold Feet (2000) was extended from six to eight episodes by ITV. Bullen believed that the production team had covered all potential storylines in the first two series, so declined to write any more episodes. A team of five writers was hired by Granada Television, overseen by Bullen as a co-executive producer. Four out of the five writers left the team due to their scripts not being appropriate for the series, leaving only David Nicholls on the staff. Writing had made Bullen think twice about not writing and he began thinking about further storylines, such as mid-life crises and IVF. The same year, he signed a two-year contract with Granada to develop new projects. A fourth series of Cold Feet, also of eight episodes, was commissioned for 2001. Bullen announced that he did not want to write a fifth series, and that the fourth would be the last. His reasons were that with ITV's proposed commission of up to 20 episodes a year, the series would become like a soap opera. The popularity of the fourth series persuaded Bullen to write four more episodes that formed the fifth series in 2003. The fifth series won Bullen the Writer of the Year Award at the 2003 British Comedy Awards.

In 2002, he began developing Life Begins, a one-hour television series. The following year he conceived George the Third. He moved to Australia in 2002 but continued to work on UK-based series.

=== 2004–2006 ===
Life Begins was inspired by Bullen's re-evaluation of the lives of people around him as they approached 40 years old. The series was designed as a vehicle for actress Sarah Lancashire, who had signed an exclusive "golden handcuffs" deal with ITV. Two months after the series was announced, Lancashire left Life Begins, feeling unable to commit to a potentially long-running series. ITV replaced Lancashire with Caroline Quentin. Life Begins concerns Maggie Mee, who believes she is in a loving relationship with her husband Phil (Alexander Armstrong). When Phil announces on a family holiday that he is leaving her, she realises that she must begin her life again. Bullen wrote the series with John Forte. The first series was broadcast in 2004. As with Cold Feet, he integrated events from his own life into the storylines; Maggie's father has Alzheimer's disease as does one of Bullen's own relatives. He researched Maggie's travel agency job by spending a week at a travel agents' in Bristol.

In 2003 Bullen made a journey to Perth's Small Screen Big Picture. On the return leg, after 12 hours of seeing nothing but the Nullarbor Plain through the train window, he began developing a short subject on infidelity at television conferences. The short, entitled Amorality Tale, which marked Bullen's directorial debut, was screened at various film festivals in 2005, and was a finalist for the first Rosemount Diamond at the Jackson Hole Film Festival. On the themes of the film, Bullen said, "What has always interested me is the notion of ordinary people and how they react in ordinary situations [...] what fascinated me is the way we arrive at the choices we make. The idea of this film is to say that the choices we make might not lead to the outcomes we expect." He formerly expressed interest in directing an episode of Cold Feet, but decided against it on the basis that his inexperience would make him "inadequate" and that the job was best left to professional directors. The short was produced by Pommie Granite Productions, a company set up by Bullen after his exclusive contract with Granada ended in September 2004. At the end of 2004, he became the seventh person to rewrite the script of the DreamWorks/Aardman Animations film Tortoise vs. Hare. He made at least three drafts.

Alongside the second series of Life Begins, Bullen continued developing George the Third. The title was changed to It Happens until eventually settling on All About George in time for filming in 2005. All About George starred Rik Mayall as George Kinsey, a builder whose life is changed when six generations of his family move into his home. Initially excited about the series when he attended the cast read-throughs, Bullen's optimism waned by the time it was broadcast as he felt there were too many characters and the series' premise unclear. In a 2008 interview, he describes it as one of his worst TV series. Life Begins returned for a third and final series in 2006. The same year, filming commenced on Tripping Over, a series about intercontinental backpackers in 1976 and 2006. SeaChange writers Andrew Knight and Andrea Denholm conceived the idea in 2003 and asked Bullen, a friend of Knight's, to develop it with them. A co-production between Australia's Channel Ten and Britain's Five, Tripping Over was broadcast in both countries at the end of 2006.

=== 2007–2012 ===
In 2007, Bullen was approached by David Maher, a Fox World producer, who commissioned him to write a television pilot for UKTV. Bullen agreed and spent a "torturous" time trying to come up with an idea for the script. Continuing his trend for taking ideas from real life, he decided to write about a family moving from the UK to Australia. The pilot, entitled Make or Break, was also Bullen's television directoral debut. British actor Robson Green had recently completed work on "Prayer of the Bone", a one-off special episode of Wire in the Blood set in the United States. Green and Wire producer Sandra Jobling considered another special episode set in Australia. Green suggested asking Bullen to write the episode and Bullen responded by asking Green if he would like to play the lead in Make or Break. Fox World sent the script to Green and he signed on. As the pilot was Bullen's first attempt at directing television, he sought advice from the experienced production crew, in particular the director of photography. The pilot was first broadcast in March 2008. Bullen and Fox World sought financial investment from a UK production company to develop a full-length series.

In 2010, Bullen wrote his first screenplay for the BBC since Sunburn; Reunited is a pilot about six friends who once shared a house together reuniting after eight years. Bullen admitted that his career was "declining" before he made Reunited, and he even moved back to the UK for five months while it was produced. He considers Reunited his best work since the end of Cold Feet. The pilot received only 3.3 million viewers when it was broadcast, and a series was not commissioned. Bullen has since discussed other projects with Ed Byrne, one of the actors in the pilot.

Bullen and his family returned to the UK in 2011; Bullen told The Manly Daily "I realised if I still am going to have a UK-based television career I need to be based in the UK." As of 2012, Bullen has three television series in development with British television networks.

== Personal life ==
Bullen is married to Lisa Bullen, whom he met while working at the BBC. They have two children: Maggie (born 1997) and Rachel (born 1999). In 2002 the family moved to Avalon, New South Wales. They later moved to Newport, New South Wales and became Australian citizens in 2005. The family returned to the UK in 2011.

== List of works ==
Screenplays

- The Perfect Match (1995)
- Comedy Premieres: Cold Feet (1997, pilot)
- Cold Feet (1998–2003)
- Sunburn (1999–2000)
- Life Begins (2004–2006)
- All About George (2005)
- Amorality Tale (2005)
- Make or Break (2008, pilot)
- Reunited (2010, pilot)

Unmade scripts

- Cold Feet (1998, American pilot)
- Small Beer (1999, American pilot)
- Tortoise vs. Hare (2004, feature film rewrite)

Director credits

- Amorality Tale (2005)
- Make or Break (2008)

Acting appearances

- Comedy Premieres: Cold Feet (1997) as Actor
- Cold Feet
  - Series 1, Episode 1 (1998) as Man on Phone
  - Series 1, Episode 2 (1998) as Neighbour
  - Series 1, Episode 3 (1998) as Man in shower (scene deleted)
  - Series 1, Episode 4 (1998) as Japanese Woman's Husband
  - Series 3, Episode 8 (2000) as Workman
  - Series 4, Episode 6 (2001) as Charles (uncredited)
- Joanne Lees: Murder in the Outback (2007) as TV Producer

== Bibliography ==
- Tibballs, Geoff (2000). Cold Feet: The Best Bits.... London: Granada Media. ISBN 0-233-99924-8.
- Smith, Rupert (2003). Cold Feet: The Complete Companion. London: Granada Media. ISBN 0-233-00999-X.
