= Pilot (Cold Feet) =

British television pilot directed by Declan Lowney

- Cold Feet episode
- Promotional material
- Directed by: Declan Lowney
- Written by: Mike Bullen
- Production code: Granada Television
- Original air date: 30 March 1997
- Running time: 52 minutes

Episode chronology
← Previous —	Next → "Episode 1"

Cold Feet is a British television pilot directed by Declan Lowney. It stars James Nesbitt and Helen Baxendale as Adam and Rachel, a couple who meet and fall in love, only for the relationship to break down when he gets cold feet. John Thomson, Fay Ripley, Hermione Norris and Robert Bathurst appear in supporting roles. The programme was written by Mike Bullen, a BBC radio producer with little screenwriting experience, who was tasked with creating a one-off television production that would appeal to middle-class television audiences, who the executive producer Andy Harries believed were underrepresented on British television.

After filming was completed in 1996 the commissioning network ITV shelved it for a year. It was eventually scheduled for broadcast on the evening of 30 March 1997, as part of the network's Comedy Premieres strand, but overrunning sports coverage delayed it for an hour. Ratings were low and critical reviews were minimal, but positive; critics enjoyed the comedy drama format and praised the writing and performances of the leads. Harries entered Cold Feet in the Montreux Television Festival, where it was awarded the Rose d'Or, the festival's top prize, resulting in ITV quickly scheduling a repeat broadcast. At the end of the year it won the award for Best Comedy Drama (ITV) at the British Comedy Awards and the incoming director of channels ordered a full series, which ran for five successful years from 1998 to 2003 followed by a revived series from 2016 to 2020.

== Plot ==
Adam Williams (James Nesbitt) breaks up with another in a long line of girlfriends and spends the evening at the pub with his friend Pete Gifford (John Thomson). Pete arrives home late, which annoys his wife Jenny (Fay Ripley), who calculated that night to be the best time for them to conceive a child. She becomes even more frustrated when she sees Pete has brought Adam back; he missed his last bus home. Rachel Bradley's (Helen Baxendale) boyfriend Simon Atkinson (Stephen Mapes) breaks up with her over dinner after taking a job in Hong Kong. Rachel angrily leaves the restaurant and telephones her friend Karen Marsden (Hermione Norris), who has just asked her husband David (Robert Bathurst) if they can get a nanny to take care of their son Josh.

Rachel crashes her car into Adam's on a supermarket car park. After a brief argument Adam suggests they exchange phone numbers, under the pretence that it is for insurance purposes. She writes hers on his rear windscreen but rain washes it off. Prompted by Pete, Adam spends a day on the supermarket car park, in the hope that he and Rachel will cross paths, but they do not meet. At a dinner party held by Karen and David, Karen suggests Rachel get out more and advises her to call Adam. They go on a date but Adam is disappointed that Rachel does not want sex. Eventually, he suggests they see a play, which happens to be on at a theatre near his house. The play is dismal but Rachel decides it is time they slept together. Jenny takes another pregnancy test, but it is negative. Adam arrives and recounts his dates with Rachel to her and Pete, telling them he loves Rachel.

In an effort to win back her love, Adam serenades Rachel wearing nothing but a rose between his buttocks.

Following a discussion with Pete about women and commitment, Adam argues with Rachel and angrily leaves her flat. Seconds later Simon returns, telling Rachel he has turned down the Hong Kong job. After getting locked out of the house, Karen interrupts a seminar David is holding, demanding they get a nanny. He relents, embarrassed after being shown up in front of his colleagues. Determined to get Rachel back, Adam goes to Simon's flat, where he serenades her wearing nothing but a rose between his buttocks. Jenny and Pete arrive to find Simon chasing a naked Adam down the street. The fight is interrupted by a passing policeman, who lists multiple felonies Adam has committed, until Rachel steps forward and takes the blame for what has happened. She declares her love to Adam and the two leave. Pete and Jenny watch and she tells him her last pregnancy test was positive.

== Production ==
=== Development ===
Writer Mike Bullen's first script, an hour-long comedy entitled The Perfect Match, was produced by Granada Television in 1995. Granada's controller of comedy Andy Harries was pleased with the balance Bullen's script struck between comedy and drama. Eager to develop a television series for middle-class thirty-somethings, Harries had Bullen pitch ideas to The Perfect Match assistant producer Christine Langan, with a view to making a pilot. Bullen's initial idea was a typical "boy meets girl, boy loses girl, boy wins girl back" story, but told from both sides of the relationship. Langan accepted Bullen's pitch and he began writing a first draft. Bullen and Langan were influenced by the American television series Thirtysomething and the film When Harry Met Sally...; the stories were funny and dramatic but neither aspect was "ghettoised". Believing that there was little television aimed at people like them, Bullen and Langan discussed their own lives and friends, using personal experiences to create the characters: Adam was based on Bullen before he met his wife and Rachel was based on a combination of his ex-girlfriends and "the fantasy girlfriend". When writing his first draft, Bullen realised that telling the same story from both sides of the relationship would mean repeating something that the audience had already seen. To rectify this he introduced the fantasy scenes and the idea of the characters reporting events in a slightly different way to what really happened.

Adam and Rachel were originally Londoners living in Chelsea. Langan proposed moving the setting to Manchester to keep production costs down by using Granada's existing studios based in the city. Harries, who wanted a series to be commissioned by ITV, agreed, believing it would make the show more accessible to viewers. Another requirement for a series was the number of potential storylines; Adam and Rachel's plot was self-contained. Harries told Bullen to expand the four supporting characters' roles, so Bullen "tacked on" their storylines. The script went through up to seven drafts before being filmed. Langan interviewed several directors before hiring Father Ted director Declan Lowney. Lowney initially rejected the script, believing the characters to be very smug. After re-reading it, he met Langan backstage after a Father Ted taping, where he compared the story to The Big Chill. Both producer and director "clicked" and Lowney joined the production team.

=== Casting ===
After commissioning the pilot, ITV Network Centre did not dictate to the producers who should be cast. John Thomson, a comedian known for his work with Steve Coogan, was the first to be cast. He had played Rick, a minor character in The Perfect Match, a role Bullen describes as "proto-Pete". Bullen was impressed by Thomson's natural comedy and Langan asked him to write a role for him to play in Cold Feet. Thomson accepted the role because he did not want to be known forever for playing "Fat Bob", the sidekick of Coogan's Paul Calf in a series of sketches. Lowney had been introduced to James Nesbitt through a mutual friend. He brought him in to audition for the part of Adam after seeing his "wonderfully expressive face" in a Persil advertisement. At the audition, Nesbitt asked to do the reading with his own accent, believing that Northern Irish characters rarely appeared in contemporary British drama without "political baggage". Langan found Nesbitt's approach to be refreshing and he was cast as Adam.

Halfway through the casting process, Cardiac Arrest actress Helen Baxendale became available. BAFTA Scotland award-nominated Baxendale was seen as a coup, though she was hesitant to audition as she believed that she could not do comedy. Harries persuaded her that she was more than qualified, citing her comedic performance in Cardiac Arrest. She was cast as Rachel on the basis of her chemistry at the audition with Nesbitt. Fay Ripley assumed that she would be reading for the role of Rachel, and was surprised to be auditioning for Jenny. Many of the actresses seen for the part were "finger-wagging" and "predictable", an approach Ripley did not take. Raised in Surrey, Ripley had to adopt a Manchester accent for the part. She "managed to bodge together a sort of Manchester accent" for the audition, assuming that she would not get the part. When she was cast, she worked on improving the accent by spending time talking to local people.

Robert Bathurst was appearing in The Rover during casting and arrived at his audition "bearded and shaggy". He did not expect to win the part of David, the "smooth" management consultant, assuming someone "a lot shinier and flashier" than him would be cast. Langan had seen him in Joking Apart and some other sitcom pilots and was attracted to his "disciplined comic energy". Hermione Norris first read for Rachel but Lowney asked her to read for Karen because her social class matched that of the character, and she had a good rapport with Bathurst. Other actors appearing are Mark Andrews as Howard, Mark Crowshaw as the waiter, John Griffin as Andrew, David Harewood as the Police Sergeant, Kathryn Hunt as Pru, Pauline Jefferson as the Old Lady, Jeremy Turner-Welch as the Neighbour, and Lewis Hancock as the Evangelist. Mike Bullen makes a cameo appearance as the actor. Bullen insisted on having a line as when he visited the set of The Perfect Match he "felt like a spare part".

=== Filming and music ===
Filming was scheduled over a 12-day period on Granada's sets and on location around Manchester, following a week of rehearsals. It was shot entirely on film stock. For the climax involving the rose, Nesbitt was required to be nearly naked on an open set, save for a small pouch that was not visible on screen. There was a risk that production could be shut down if residents of the street they were filming on complained to the police, so the production manager ensured that Nesbitt was covered up when he was not being filmed. Filming the five-minute scene took about two hours. The song "Female of the Species" by Space was used throughout the programme; the instrumental version plays over the opening credits and the full lyrical version is heard during a first-act montage. The track was chosen by Langan after she heard it on The Chart Show. The rest of the incidental music and the main end credits theme was composed by The Other Two. Adam's song was originally scripted to be Nilsson's "Without You" but the rights to the song were too expensive. The song was substituted with "I've Got You Under My Skin".

== Reception ==
Following post-production, the programme was shelved by ITV Network Centre until 1997, when it was placed on the Easter weekend schedule as part of the network's "Comedy Premieres" programming strand. The broadcast, scheduled for a 9 pm start on 30 March, went head-to-head with launch night of Channel 5, Britain's last terrestrial television channel, and the second part of the BBC1 drama The Missing Postman. Also broadcast on 30 March was ITV's coverage of the Brazilian Grand Prix. The race was restarted due to an accident and threw ITV's evening schedules into disarray. Broadcast of Cold Feet eventually began 40 minutes later than originally advertised and the overnight ratings reflected this; it recorded viewing figures of just 3.5 million. Harries wrote it off as a failure, telling Langan that they would never get a series. Some critical success came though; writing in The Times the day after it aired, Matthew Bond called it "an enjoyable one-off comedy aimed at anybody who's ever been single, married, or had children. With such catholic appeal further heightened by Helen Baxendale heading a talented cast, it showed just what ITV can do when it is trying to win awards, such as the Golden Rose of Montreux."

An ITV committee selected Cold Feet to represent the network in the comedy drama category at the Montreux Television Festival at the end of April. Bullen was unable to attend the Rose d'Or ceremony as he was sick with flu, so Harries took his place. The programme won the Silver Rose in the Humour category and the Golden Rose of Montreux, the festival's highest honour. The Montreux jury was headed by David Liddiment, who became ITV's director of channels in the latter half of 1997 and was influential in ordering a full series from Harries. Peter Salmon, Granada's director of programmes, called the win "a reflection of the brilliant production and acting talents of the team". Paul Spencer, the ITV network controller of comedy, called it "exactly the kind of comedy at which ITV excels. Bullen met with ITV executives to outline a series, and storylines were established by the end of May.

After the success at Montreux, ITV scheduled a repeat of Cold Feet for 25 May, this time at 9 pm The repeat brought in 5.60 million viewers, making it the 66th most-watched programme on British television that week. A. A. Gill, who had not seen the original broadcast, wrote that "it was lifted from being merely whimsical by some bow-tight comic acting and a great script", though he did not see the Golden Rose win as a particularly glorious achievement, citing the saturation of the Montreux Festival by British programmes in the 1990s. Further recognition came at the end of the year at the British Comedy Awards when Cold Feet won the Best Comedy Drama (ITV) award and at the Royal Television Society Programme Awards, where it was nominated for Best Situation Comedy & Comedy Drama. Helen Baxendale was nominated for the British Comedy Award for Top Television Comedy Actress but lost to Dawn French. At the RTS North West Awards, Cold Feet won the award for Best Network Entertainment Programme. The programme has retained the interest of reviewers several years after its original broadcast; writing for The Jerusalem Post, Aryeh Dean Cohen said, "The cast sparkles all around, as does the script, and the characters are endearing and believable."

Granada's sale of the series package to American cable network Bravo in 2000 included this pilot. Bravo hired agency G WhiZ to design a series of print and media advertisements for the series to run in such publications as The New York Times. G WhiZ based their campaign on the shot of Adam's buttocks, which led to many publications either asking for an alternative or refusing to carry the promotion outright.

== Home media ==
Cold Feet's first home video publication came in 1999 when it was released on VHS by Video Collection International, with the subtitle "A comedy about life, love & everything else!" A short behind-the-scenes feature on the filming of the second series was included. It was also released together with the double-video set and DVD of the first series. In July 2007, it was made available as streaming media on ITV's revamped itv.com website and in April 2008 was made available for purchase on ITV's iTunes Store shop.
