= The Perfect Match (1995 film) =

- Genre: Comedy drama
- Written by: Mike Bullen
- Directed by: Nick Hurran
- Starring: Saskia Reeves; Con O'Neill; Beth Goddard; John Thomson; Sheila Gish; Roger Lloyd-Pack; Peter Howitt
- Country of origin: United Kingdom
- Original language: English

Production
- Producers: Andy Harries; Justin Judd
- Running time: 77 minutes
- Production company: Granada Television

Original release
- Network: ITV
- Release: 6 September 1995

The Perfect Match is a British comedy-drama television film written by Mike Bullen and directed by Nick Hurran. It stars Saskia Reeves and Con O'Neill as Bridget and Phil, a couple whose marriage proposal is broadcast to football fans. It was first broadcast on the ITV network on 6 September 1995. The programme was not well received by critics but it was enough of a success for producers Granada Television to ask Bullen for further ideas, leading to the commissioning of the long-running television series Cold Feet.

== Plot ==
Manchester United supporter Phil (Con O'Neill) proposes to his girlfriend Bridget (Saskia Reeves) on the big screen at Wembley during the FA Cup Final. They soon become minor national celebrities, attracting the attention of the tabloid newspaper The Sun and television presenter Keith Chegwin. The public frenzy leads Bridget to decide not to marry Phil. The two eventually reconcile and marry out of the public eye.

== Production ==
Believing that there was nothing on British television for people in his age group that was not a soap opera or a costume drama, screenwriter Mike Bullen wrote the script for The Perfect Match. He secured an agent, who managed to sell the script on spec to Andy Harries, controller of comedy at Granada Television. Harries described the writing as "impressive—cleverly constructed dialogue, very funny, well observed" and commissioned it as part of his drive to move away from making traditional-style sitcoms. Bullen described the moment he walked onto the set of The Perfect Match as "gobsmacking […] wandering around a room which had previously only existed in my head".

Filming took place at Wembley Stadium during the 1995 FA Cup Final between Everton and Manchester United.

== Reception ==
The Perfect Match was broadcast on the ITV network on 6 September 1995.

Jaci Stephen in the Daily Mirror wrote "The Perfect Match didn't quite come off. The idea was good enough, but the writing was too cliche-ridden to do justice to it. The interfering mother is a well-known comic figure, and Mike Bullen's script added nothing to the caricature to make a unique character. The tabloid journalist was also a cliche […] The romantic lines could have come straight out of Mills And Boon […] It was watchable enough, and there were lovely performances from the central characters. Tighter script editing, however, could have turned a good drama into an outstanding one."

The Perfect Match also screened at the 1995 Cologne Film Festival, where it was a prizewinner.
