= Sunburn (TV series) =

- Genre: Drama; Docudrama
- Created by: Mike Bullen
- Written by: Mike Bullen; Lizzie Mickery
- Starring: Michelle Collins; Rebecca Callard; Sharon Small; George Layton; Sean Maguire; Paul Nicholas; Natalie J. Robb
- Country of origin: United Kingdom
- Original language: English
- No. of series: 2
- No. of episodes: 14

Production
- Running time: 60 mins

Original release
- Network: BBC One
- Release: 16 January 1999 – 11 March 2000

Sunburn is a British television series that followed the lives of a group of British holiday reps. It was broadcast on BBC One between 16 January 1999 and 11 March 2000, running for two series of six and eight episodes respectively. The first was set and filmed in Cyprus and the second in Algarve. The cast included Michelle Collins, Rebecca Callard, Sharon Small, George Layton and Sean Maguire, with Paul Nicholas joining later. The series was created by Mike Bullen, who was interested in the behind-the-scenes lives of holiday reps after watching the docusoap Holiday Reps. Bullen wrote most of the first series but scaled back his involvement in the second; most of that series' episodes were written by Lizzie Mickery.

The series has never been officially released on video or DVD, nor in any digital format. In March 2023 both series were made available for streaming on UKTV Play.

== Episodes ==
=== Series one (1999) ===
- Episode one (16 January 1999) – Nicki Matthews arrives to take over as Janus Holidays' head rep.
- Episode two (23 January 1999) – Laura has to look after a family of appalling holidaymakers, while Carol conspires to reunite Nicki with Yiannis.
- Episode three (30 January 1999) – Carol agrees to organise a small wedding for two holiday-makers.
- Episode four (6 February 1999) – Yiannis's wife puts Nicki in an awkward spot. Julie's parents arrive.
- Episode five (13 February 1999) – Alan gets into trouble with the police.
- Episode six (20 February 1999) – Nicki must choose between Yiannis and Steve. Will Greg and Maria ever be reconciled?

=== Series two (2000) ===
- A Tale of Kidnap and Celebrity (22 January 2000) – Nicki and her team are still finding their feet in their new resort when Alan is mistakenly kidnapped by a homosexual rights group.
- New Opportunities, Second Chances and Dominoes (29 January 2000) – A domino competition keeps the reps busy, while Nicki gets an offer she may not be able to refuse.
- Children and Growing Up (5 February 2000) – David and Nicki swap places for a week to prove how easy the other's job is.
- Unexpected Love and Golf (12 February 2000) – A golf tournament adds to the reps' workload, while Carol discovers a magical passion.
- Friendship and Deception (19 February 2000) – Is a holiday-maker's romance with a playboy all it seems? Nicki and the Janus reps investigate.
- Young Love and Family Feuds (26 February 2000) – Two teenagers fall in love while the Janus team are kept busy organising a medieval banquet.
- Marriage, Club Trouble and the Bungee Jump (4 March 2000) – Carol is pursued by a love-struck holidaymaker, while Greg's antics turn his love-life into a dangerous farce.
- Sabotage and Redemption (11 March 2000) – The end of season party leads to some unexpected repercussions, and Janus Holidays finds itself at the mercy of a saboteur.

== Cast ==
Character	Portrayed by	Seasons	
Character	Portrayed by	1	2
Nicki Matthews	Michelle Collins	Main	Main
Laura Hutchings	Rebecca Callard	Main	Main
Carol Simpson	Sharon Small	Main	Main
Greg Patterson	James Buller	Main	Main
Alan Brookes	George Layton	Main	Main
Lee Wilson	Sean Maguire		Main
Julie Hill	Colette Brown	Main	
David Janus	Paul Nicholas		Main
Yiannis Kyprianou	Peter Polycarpou	Main	
Maria Ioannides	Natalie J. Robb	Main	
Tassos Ioannides	George Zenios	Main	
Elena Kyprianou	Zeta Graff	Main	

=== Guest appearances ===
Over the course of the two series many well known celebrities appeared including Isla Fisher, Josephine Tewson, James D'Arcy, Robin Askwith, Maxine Peake, Colin Baker, Windsor Davies, Cliff Parisi and John Pickard Jan Francis

== Music ==
The theme song was sung by Collins and was released on cassette and CD in 1999
