= Cold Feet =

British comedy-drama TV series

- Genre: Comedy drama
- Created by: Mike Bullen
- Starring: James Nesbitt; Helen Baxendale; John Thomson; Fay Ripley; Robert Bathurst; Hermione Norris; Jacey Sallés; Kimberley Joseph; Sean Pertwee; Lucy Robinson; Leanne Best; Cel Spellman
- Composers: Mark Russell (Series 1–5); Edmund Butt (Series 6–9)
- Country of origin: United Kingdom
- Original language: English
- No. of series: 9
- No. of episodes: 60 (list of episodes)

Production
- Executive producers: Andy Harries; Christine Langan; Mike Bullen
- Producers: Christine Langan; Spencer Campbell; Emma Benson
- Production locations: Manchester, England
- Camera setup: Single-camera
- Production companies: Granada Television (1997–2003); Big Talk Productions (2016–2020)

Original release
- Network: ITV
- Release: 30 March 1997 – 16 March 2003
- Release: 5 September 2016 – 17 February 2020

Related
- Cold Feet (pilot); Cold Feet (American TV series); Usta usta; Přešlapy

Cold Feet is a British comedy drama television series produced by Granada Television for the ITV network. The series was created and principally written by Mike Bullen as a follow-up to his 1997 Comedy Premiere special of the same name. The series follows three couples experiencing the ups-and-downs of romance, originally Adam Williams and Rachel Bradley (James Nesbitt and Helen Baxendale), Pete and Jenny Gifford (John Thomson and Fay Ripley) and Karen and David Marsden (Hermione Norris and Robert Bathurst). As the original series progressed, the Giffords divorced and Pete married Jo Ellison (Kimberley Joseph), whilst Karen and David also separated, forming relationships with Mark Cubitt (Sean Pertwee) and Robyn Duff (Lucy Robinson).

The original series was executive-produced by Bullen with Granada's head of comedy Andy Harries, and produced by Christine Langan, Spencer Campbell and Emma Benson. 32 episodes were broadcast over the original five series from 15 November 1998 to 16 March 2003. A revival with all of the original cast except Baxendale (Rachel had been killed off) began airing from 5 September 2016.

The revived series introduced Cel Spellman as Matthew, Adam and Rachel's now teenage son, alongside Karen David as Adam's second wife Angela Zubayr following the death of Rachel, and Art Malik as Angela's business tycoon father Eddie, a love interest for Karen Marsden. Pete and Jenny had remarried whilst David's marriage to Robyn was crumbling. Leanne Best was introduced as Tina Reynolds, Adam's partner following his separation from Angela. After his separation from Robyn, Nikki Kirkbright (Siobhan Finneran) is introduced as David's new partner, and Adam later forms a relationship with Karen.

In 2020, at the conclusion of series 9, it was announced in a group statement that Cold Feet was being rested for the foreseeable future, with a view to returning once again when the characters have reached the next suitable age for stories to tell.

== Background ==
Series creator Mike Bullen's working relationship with Granada Television began in 1994 when his agent sold his first screenplay, a one-off comedy drama called The Perfect Match, to the company's head of comedy Andy Harries. Harries had been looking for television scripts that would reflect the lives of people from his generation—people in their 30s who were under-represented on television. The Perfect Match, about a man who proposes to his girlfriend at the FA Cup Final and has to deal with constant media attention afterwards, was made and then broadcast in 1995. Harries asked Bullen to pitch more ideas for television to The Perfect Match's assistant producer Christine Langan. As a fan of American television such as Thirtysomething, Frasier and Hill Street Blues, Bullen pitched Cold Feet, a traditional "boy-meets-girl, boy-loses-girl, boy-wins-girl-back" story told from both sides of the relationship but using elements of fantasy and flashback to distort events to fit a character's point of view. The initial pitch centred on Adam Williams and Rachel Bradley (James Nesbitt and Helen Baxendale), which Harries believed would diminish the storytelling potential if the ITV Network Centre commissioned a full series after the pilot, so Bullen "tacked on" plots for two other couples—Adam and Rachel's respective friends Pete and Jenny Gifford (John Thomson and Fay Ripley) and David and Karen Marsden (Robert Bathurst and Hermione Norris).

The pilot was directed by Father Ted's Declan Lowney over 12 days in 1996 on location around Greater Manchester. The programme was one of four one-off Comedy Premieres made by Granada for ITV. Cold Feet was eventually broadcast on 30 March 1997. It received only 3.5 million viewers and little critical attention. As ITV's comedy portfolio was so thin, Cold Feet was submitted as the network's comedy entry at the Montreux Television Festival in May 1997. There it won the Silver Rose for Humour and the Rose d'Or, the highest accolade of the festival. ITV scheduled a repeat broadcast a few days afterwards but did not commission a series. Not until David Liddiment's appointment as director of programming at ITV in August 1997 was a six-episode series ordered.

== Series synopses ==
=== Series 1 ===
The first series begins nine months after the pilot episode. After Pete and Jenny's baby is born in Episode 1, the couple have a hard time getting any sleep. Pete has to cope with the death of his father in Episode 4. Adam and Rachel decide to rent a house together. He is horrified to discover in Episode 2 that she is married to another man. While he is staying with Pete and Jenny, Rachel has sex with her visiting husband (Lennie James)—who leaves soon after—and is pregnant by Episode 6. Just as the relationship between Rachel and Adam is recovering, she tells him that he might not be the father, and that she is moving to London until the birth. Karen and David have recently hired Ramona as a nanny to their young son Josh. At her publishing job, Karen edits the novel of a renowned author (Denis Lawson), whom she becomes attracted to. She plans to sleep with him on a book tour but is humiliated when she finds out he is not attracted to her. David tries to sleep with Ramona to get back at Karen, which causes friction between the couple. They seek guidance counselling to repair their marriage.

=== Series 2 ===
Six months after the last series, Rachel returns from London and tells Adam that she aborted the baby, and their relationship seems over for good. They both start seeing other people—he one of Pete's colleagues (Rosie Cavaliero) and she a man much younger than her (Hugh Dancy)—but reconcile after Adam is diagnosed and treated for testicular cancer in Episode 5. David is made redundant at work and decides to be a stay-at-home dad for Josh. After some interference from Karen, he takes a new job. Their relationship improves from the first series; they spend their wedding anniversary in Paris and Karen announces in Episode 6 that she is pregnant. Pete and Jenny's marriage deteriorates when she reveals she had a crush on Adam. Pete later sleeps with a co-worker— with whom Adam was also briefly involved—and Jenny tells him to move out of the house. They decide to give their marriage another chance when Adam's cancer puts things into perspective. In Episode 6, all three couples see in the new millennium on a trip to Lindisfarne, where Pete and Jenny's relationship worsens again as the others' improve.

=== Series 3 ===
Half a year after the Lindisfarne trip, Pete and Jenny have separated. He moves from house to house, eventually finding a houseshare with a gay landlord. He has a brief fling with Ramona, which is followed by some dates with a teacher (Pooky Quesnel). Jenny begins a relationship with a dotcom millionaire (Ben Miles), who decorates her house with flowers and takes her on a trip to New York. The fling ends when Jenny realises he does not love her. She and Pete reconcile after briefly considering a divorce. David and Karen bring home their newborn twins, and Karen's ex-pat mother (Mel Martin) moves in for a couple of episodes. Karen is reunited with an old boyfriend (Richard Dillane), who is in Manchester for a photography exhibition. Karen is rivalled by Jenny, who has returned to working to pay the bills while Pete is living elsewhere. David takes a sudden interest in politics after meeting local residents' activist Jessica (Yasmin Bannerman). He starts an affair with her but she dumps him after being offended by his insensitivity when he tries to end it. Karen finds out about the affair in Episode 8 but is adamant that she and David will stay together for the children. Adam and Rachel decide to have children but are distraught to discover that she is infertile from complications with her abortion. They decide to get married instead but Adam is briefly tempted when he reunites with a long-lost love (Victoria Smurfit) on his stag weekend in Belfast.

=== Series 4 ===
Jenny and Pete await the birth of their second child but after a miscarriage, Jenny rethinks her life. In Episode 2 she decides to take a job in New York, and leaves with little Adam. Pete is unhappy for a time but begins a relationship with Jo Ellison, a friend of Rachel's. The relationship goes well until Jo has to return to Australia after her visa expires. Pete follows her and declares his love and they get married in Episode 8. Karen and David are sleeping in separate beds until she decides he should move out. He moves into Pete's spare bedroom and starts seeing a therapist (Michael Troughton). Karen develops alcoholism and decides to seek therapy too. She and David reconcile and he moves back in. Soon, she starts an affair with a publisher, Mark (Sean Pertwee), which is revealed to David in Episode 8. Having had enough of the lies, he leaves Karen. Adam and Rachel decide to adopt a child and begin going through the procedures. They are pleased when they later discover that Rachel is pregnant but are distraught when their social worker tells them that the adoption cannot proceed. In Australia for Pete and Jo's wedding, Rachel goes into premature labour and gives birth to a boy.

=== Series 5 ===
Three months after the birth of their baby, Adam is made redundant. He gets a new job, but then he and Rachel are told that after the death of their landlord they will be evicted from their house. As they search for a new place to live, Adam's estranged father, Bill (Ian McElhinney), arrives. Bill and Adam patch up their relationship and he offers Adam and Rachel the money to buy their own house. On the way to the auction, Rachel is killed in a car crash, leaving Adam devastated. Her ashes are scattered in the final episode. Karen and David are going through an amicable divorce but when she starts seeing Mark again and David starts seeing his new lawyer Robyn (Lucy Robinson), it escalates, as they begin using each other's infidelity and her alcoholism as a basis for custody of the children. Karen stops seeing Mark and the divorce cools down. Both re-evaluate their lives after Rachel's death; David develops his relationship with Robyn and Karen plans a trip with Ramona. Pete and Jo's marriage deteriorates when she sleeps with a co-worker (Richard Armitage) on a work weekend away. Jenny returns from New York in Episode 4 and moves back in with Pete after he asks Jo for a divorce.

=== Series 6 ===
After a jet-set life in Singapore, Adam returns to Manchester to visit his old friends and to see son Matthew (now portrayed by Cel Spellman), breaking the news of his upcoming nuptials with businesswoman Angela Zubayr (Karen David). This isn't well received amongst the group, especially Matthew who sees Angela as a replacement for his mother Rachel. Struggling to support his family, Pete finds himself in two run down jobs and suffering from depression, which Jenny seems oblivious to. Seeing a fault in their love life, she pursues a fling with client Trevor Green (Nicholas Gleaves), who begins to stalk her. Torn apart after the death of Harry (James Bolam), an old man who he was caring for, Pete considers suicide. David is entangled through a wrongdoing at work and is arrested, something which his wife Robyn finds humiliating and throws him out of their luxury Cheshire home. Karen finds herself on the dating game, and soon falls for Adam's father-in-law Eddie (Art Malik), though later discovers that they live in two very different worlds, with Karen's twin daughters Ellie (Ella Hunt) and Olivia (Daisy Edgar-Jones) still dependent on her. Jenny's ex-partner Grant (Robert Webb) from her time in New York City turns up on her doorstep determined to see their daughter Chloe (Madeleine Edmondson), who still believes that Pete is her father. Struggling to cope with living in Manchester and being step-mother to Matthew, Angela decides to end her marriage with Adam, who fell quickly for his landlord Tina Reynolds (Leanne Best). At Adam's 49th Birthday party, the Marsdens' eldest son Josh (Callum Woodhouse) arrives from Spain with former nanny Ramona (Jacey Salles), and it is later revealed that he is gay.

=== Series 7 ===
Setting up her own publishing house Marsden House, Karen is relying on useless Ramona as personal assistant. Adam is determined to take things one step further with Tina so they can move in together, though she doesn't want to rush things and especially not with David now living with Adam and Matthew following his divorce from Robyn. Pete has landed on his feet as a chauffeur, and Jenny is finding herself seeing a lot less of her husband. Matthew's relationship with Olivia is taken to the next level, to the shock of Karen and Adam.

=== Series 8 ===
The series began filming in Manchester on 19 March 2018 and continued until July. It began airing on 14 January 2019 and concluded on 18 February 2019 after 6 episodes.

=== Series 9 ===
The six episodes of series 9 aired on ITV from 13 January 2020, to 17 February 2020. The creator and the main cast have both confirmed that the show has gone on prolonged hiatus again after this series.

== Cast and characters ==
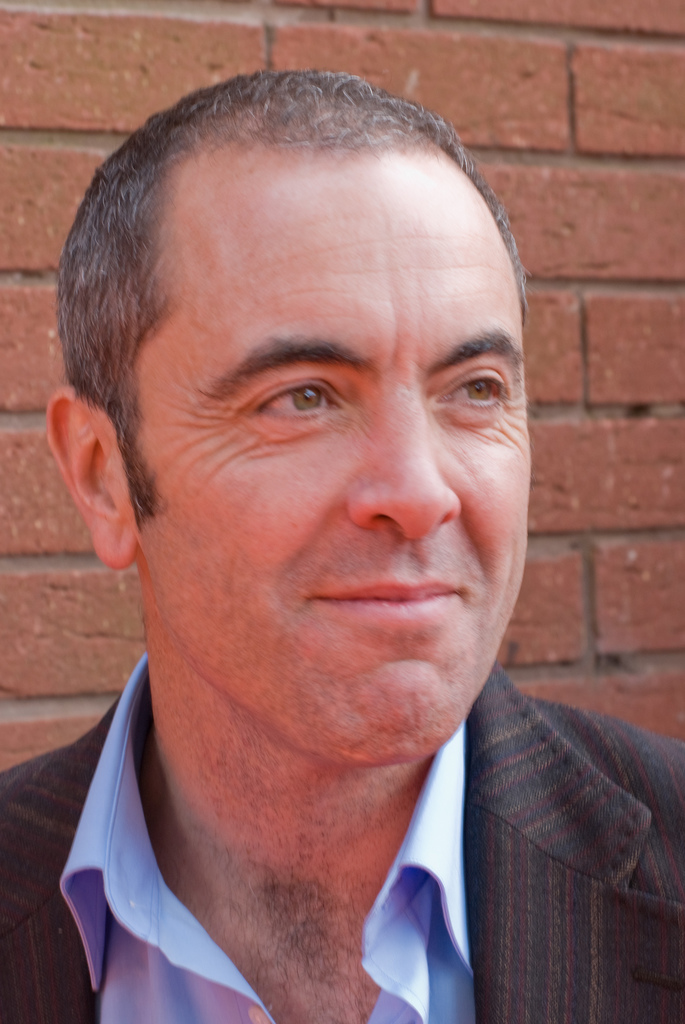
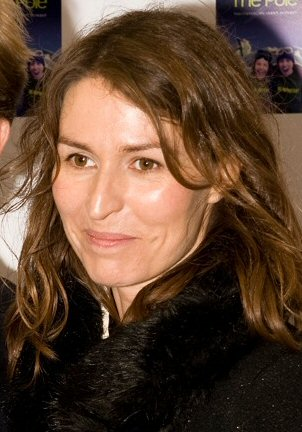
James Nesbitt plays Adam Williams in all nine series, while Helen Baxendale appeared as Rachel Bradley until series five.

Cold Feet began its first series with the six main cast members—James Nesbitt, Helen Baxendale, John Thomson, Fay Ripley, Hermione Norris and Robert Bathurst—who had appeared in the pilot. Thomson's character Pete Gifford was written specifically for him after his performance in The Perfect Match made a positive impression on Christine Langan. Norris originally auditioned for the part of Rachel but was cast as Karen because the role suited her social class. Nesbitt got an audition through a mutual friend of pilot director Declan Lowney, and read the part in his natural accent because he was keen to play a Northern Irish character in a contemporary drama unconnected to The Troubles.

Baxendale was best known for her role in Cardiac Arrest and was hesitant to star as Rachel because she did not believe she could perform comedy. Bathurst was known to Langan for his starring role in Joking Apart. Ripley thought she would be auditioning for the part of Rachel, and had to put on an accent for her role as natural Mancunian Jenny. When the fourth series was commissioned, Ripley announced that she was leaving the show to broaden her career options. Kimberley Joseph was cast as Jo Ellison, a replacement character who remained on screen until the conclusion of Cold Feet's first run. Bullen makes numerous Hitchcock-esque cameo appearances; he plays a neighbour and a husband in the first series and a workman in the third.

=== Main cast ===
Actor	Character	Series								
Actor	Character	1	2	3	4	5	6	7	8	9
James Nesbitt	Adam Williams	Main	Main	Main	Main	Main	Main	Main	Main	Main
Helen Baxendale	Rachel Bradley	Main	Main	Main	Main	Main				
John Thomson	Pete Gifford	Main	Main	Main	Main	Main	Main	Main	Main	Main
Fay Ripley	Jenny Gifford	Main	Main	Main	Main	Guest	Main	Main	Main	Main
Robert Bathurst	David Marsden	Main	Main	Main	Main	Main	Main	Main	Main	Main
Hermione Norris	Karen Marsden	Main	Main	Main	Main	Main	Main	Main	Main	Main
Jacey Sallés	Ramona Ramirez	Also starring	Also starring	Also starring	Also starring	Also starring	Guest	Also starring	Guest	
Doreen Keogh	Audrey Gifford	Guest		Guest	Guest	Guest				
Kate Rutter	Sheila Blyth	Guest								
Sally Rogers	Sheila Blyth						Guest	Guest		Recurring
Lorelei King	Natalie	Recurring	Recurring		Guest					
Rosie Cavaliero	Amy		Recurring							
Ben Miles	Robert Brown			Recurring						
Yasmin Bannerman	Jessica			Recurring						
Kimberley Joseph	Jo Ellison				Main	Main				
Sean Pertwee	Mark Cubitt				Recurring	Recurring				
Lucy Robinson	Robyn Duff					Recurring	Also starring	Guest	Guest	Also starring
Richard Armitage	Lee					Recurring				
Cel Spellman	Matthew Williams						Also starring	Also starring	Also starring	Also starring
Leanne Best	Tina Reynolds						Also starring	Also starring		
Daisy Edgar-Jones	Olivia Marsden						Recurring	Recurring	Recurring	Recurring
Ella Hunt	Ellie Marsden						Recurring	Recurring		
Sylvie Briggs	Ellie Marsden								Recurring	Recurring
Jack Harper	Adam Gifford						Recurring	Recurring	Recurring	Recurring
Madeleine Edmondson	Chloe Gifford						Recurring	Recurring	Recurring	Recurring
Marji Campi	Barbara Blyth						Guest	Recurring	Recurring	Recurring
Callum Woodhouse	Joshua Marsden						Guest		Guest	
Karen David	Angela Zubayr						Also starring			
Art Malik	Eddie Zubayr						Also starring			
James Bolam	Harry Matthews						Also starring			
Robert Webb	Grant Hodges						Also starring			
Amy Huberman	Sarah Poynter						Guest	Also starring		
Gerald Kyd	Roger Muir						Recurring			Also starring
Siobhan Finneran	Nikki Kirkbright							Also starring	Also starring	
Paul Ritter	Benjamin Stevens							Also starring	Guest	Guest
Robert Glenister	George Kirkbright							Also starring		
Kieran Bew	Gareth Newton							Also starring		
Ivanno Jeremiah	Charlie Sinclair								Also starring	Guest
Eve Myles	Caitlin Henderson								Also starring	
Paul Kaye	The Reverend Daniel Booth								Also starring	
Michelle Holmes	Mary								Guest	Guest
Sacha Parkinson	Laura									Also starring
Sunetra Sarker	Deborah									Also starring
Gemma Jones	Heather									Also starring
Frances Barber	Maxine Ibsen									Guest

=== Main characters ===
(from left): Robert Bathurst, Hermione Norris, James Nesbitt, Helen Baxendale, John Thomson, and Fay Ripley

The main characters are six core characters were devised to be "regular people, not distinguished by their careers or by crime" and were based on people from Mike Bullen's life, along with characters who became integral to the programme as Cold Feet progressed.

- Adam Williams is a serial womaniser who lives a carefree lifestyle until he settles down with Rachel—though he is still tempted by the next-door neighbour and women in fast cars. (Note: Series 1, Episode 4. 6 December 1998.) (Note: Series 4, Episode 6. 3 December 2001.) Bullen based Adam's womanising personality on how he saw himself during his twenties. He is diagnosed and treated for testicular cancer during the second series, (Note: Series 2, Episode 5. 24 October 1999.) a storyline developed by Bullen to directly contrast Adam's Lothario characterisation. Adam marries Rachel in series 3 and their son, Matthew, is born in series 4. (Note: Series 3, Episode 8. 26 December 2000.) (Note: Series 4, Episode 8. 10 December 2001.) In series 5, Adam's estranged father Bill Williams arrives in Manchester. Adam moves to patch up the relationship after Bill comes out as a bisexual. (Note: Series 5, Episode 3. 9 March 2003.) After Rachel's death, Adam and Matthew leave their old house to see Bill. (Note: Series 5, Episode 4. 16 March 2003.) Adam's backstory was inconsistent; the first series established that Adam and Pete had known each other since their childhood when they attended the same school in Manchester. To justify Adam's accent, his Northern Irish origins were developed in series 3 and it was explained on screen that he spent his school holidays there. His background is reinforced when his father is introduced in series 5. Bullen admitted that Adam's biography was never fully planned but conceded that Cold Feet was "full of gaffes".
- Rachel Bradley is an advertising executive. After being with Adam for nine months, she admits to him that she is married but promises to ask her estranged husband for a divorce. (Note: Series 1, Episode 2. 22 November 1998.) Unknown to Adam, while her husband is in Manchester, she has sex with him and later finds out she is pregnant. (Note: Series 1, Episode 6. 20 December 1998.) Unable to cope with not knowing who the father is, she terminates the pregnancy. (Note: Series 2, Episode 1. 26 September 1999.) The abortion causes her to become infertile. She marries Adam at the end of series 3 and has a surprise conception in series 4, which leads to the birth of her child. She is killed in a car crash in Series 5. Helen Baxendale became pregnant during series 4, which meant the plot of Rachel being infertile had to be abandoned and the rest of the series re-written. Baxendale found the character limiting and hard to play when she was just "the woman that Adam saw through rose-tinted glasses". She found that, as the series progressed, Bullen learned how to write for the character, giving her a clearer idea of how to play her. She found the death of Rachel "unfair" and believed the character was being punished for terminating her pregnancy.
- Pete Gifford is Jenny's husband and has been Adam's best friend since childhood. Bullen based Pete on his own childhood friend, with whom he went through university. Pete is often deliberately insensitive towards Adam, which Thomson attributes to Pete thinking Adam is jealous of his achievements. In series 2, Pete has an affair with co-worker Amy. (Note: Series 2, Episode 3. 10 October 1999.) It upsets his marriage to Jenny and by series 3 they are separated. (Note: Series 3, Episode 1. 12 November 2000.) At the beginning of series 4, they are back together and expecting a second child. After Jenny miscarries, she leaves Pete and takes little Adam with her. (Note: Series 4, Episode 2. 18 November 2001.) Pete has a rebound relationship with Jo, and marries her at the end of series 4. They break up at the end of Series 5.
- Jenny Gifford (née Blyth) is Pete's wife. She spends much of the first series raising their baby. In series 2, she develops a brief crush on Adam. (Note: Series 2, Episode 2. 3 October 1999.) She throws Pete out of the house when she finds out about his affair with Amy but they try to repair the marriage after Adam's cancer treatment. When she and Pete separate in series 3, she asserts her independence in a series of short-lived secretarial jobs, and by dating millionaire Robert Brown. (Note: Series 3, Episode 2. 12 November 2000.) She and Pete briefly consider a divorce but get back together after Robert dumps her. In series 4, the couple are expecting a second child. Jenny miscarries and re-evaluates her life in Manchester. She is offered a job in New York by the head of the company she works for and decides to divorce Pete and leave for America with their son. She returns for Rachel's funeral in series 5 and moves back in with Pete. Ripley said of her character, "Jenny's very ballsy and speaks her mind, but she's more sensitive than people give her credit for. She's seen as very hard but I don't think she is—it's just that she won't show her vulnerability to everyone."
- David Marsden is a management consultant and the husband of Karen. The Marsdens were the least-developed characters when the pilot was produced; Robert Bathurst noted that David was "set up as a post-Thatcherite boo-boy to represent all that is evil about materialism". He was concerned that the only character note in the script related to David's high salary and that, to make more than a brief cameo appearance in the series, the character needed to be significantly developed. David is made redundant in series 2 and Karen arranges for him to take a new, better-paid job. In Episode 3, the couple celebrate their wedding anniversary in Paris. The episode originally had a downbeat ending scripted but was changed on the advice of Andy Harries and the editor of the episode. David and Karen both then have affairs; David with local residents' campaigner Jessica in series 3, and Karen with publisher Mark in series 4. The affairs lead to the end of their marriage, which was discussed to great lengths by the production staff. David starts a relationship with his solicitor, Robyn Duff, in series 5 and divorces Karen.
- Karen Marsden (née Childs) is a publishing editor and the wife of David. Of Karen, Norris said, "[S]he's the strength behind the marriage. David thinks he wears the trousers and she is prepared to think that to an extent. So she manages to massage his ego and then does her own thing anyway." Karen becomes an alcoholic in series 4 and seeks therapy to control her urges. (Note: Series 4, Episode 3. 25 November 2001.) After trying to put David's affair with Jessica behind them, Karen starts an affair with publisher Mark. She breaks up with him via email while in Australia but he flies down and reveals their relationship to David. She briefly gets back together with Mark during her divorce from David in series 5 but ends the relationship again when he wants nothing to do with her children. (Note: Series 5, Episode 2. 2 March 2003.) After Rachel's death, Karen sees a grief counsellor. Norris and Bullen changed Karen's personality significantly between the pilot and the series; Norris altered the character's accent to be less "posh" and Bullen wrote her to be more sympathetic. Bullen found it difficult to write situations for Karen that took place outside the character's house. Eventually, he wrote a storyline for her in series 2 where she rebels against her upper-middle-class lifestyle by smoking cannabis at a dinner party. Norris was disappointed that the plot of Karen and David's divorce could not be developed further in series 5, as the majority of screen time was given to Adam and Rachel. In the rebooted series, Karen and Adam develop a friendship, embarking on a romance by the eighth series.
- Joanne "Jo" Ellison is introduced as a co-worker at Rachel's advertising agency in series 4. After Jenny leaves England and Jo is evicted from her flat, she moves into Pete's spare room. (Note: Series 4, Episode 5. 2 December 2001.) The two fall in love and marry in Australia in Episode 8. In series 5, Pete suspects that Jo may have married him as a visa scam to stay in Britain. Their relationship is damaged and Jo sleeps with a colleague on a work weekend away. Pete asks her for a divorce when he finds out. Jo was devised when Bullen and Harries wanted Pete to fall in love with an Australian woman so they could film the series 4 finale in Sydney. Kimberley Joseph was based in Los Angeles and had been out of work for 18 months before getting an audition with Spencer Campbell. Two weeks later she had moved to Manchester and was doing read-throughs with the rest of the cast. Joseph thought Bullen had envisioned the character as a coarse "big fat truck-driving lesbian type" before he met her. Thomson thought Pete's lust for Jo was a rebound from Jenny and that, while Jo genuinely liked Pete, she did not actually love him, which Pete suspects when he reads Jo's emails in series 5, Episode 2.
- Tina Reynolds is introduced as Adam's Landlady upon his return to Manchester in series 6. Over the course of the series, she and Adam grow closer before both amicably beginning a relationship at its conclusion. At the beginning of series 7, Tina and Adam move in together and decide to start a family together. However, due to Adam's infidelity and his inability to solidly declare his feelings for Tina, the two amicably decide to break up. Despite this, Tina had firmly established herself as one of the six Cold Feet-ers, making friends with Jenny and Karen.
- Ramona Ramirez is introduced as the Marsdens' Spanish nanny, originally a minor character that was intended to be in the programme for only 2 episodes, believing that the Mardens would regularly replace their son's carer. She subsequently became a series regular and an important supporting character and friend to the main 6 characters eventually appearing in all 5 series of Cold Feet's original run and appeared in nearly every episode. Ramona was developed to be the complete opposite of the typically English Karen and David. David finds her continental personality annoying but Karen enjoys it. Ramona's role in series 2 developed beyond just child-caring—in Episode 2, she bribes David for £30 to cook dinner for his former boss. By series 3, she has a major storyline where she dates Pete. In series 4, she gets caught up in Karen and David's deteriorating marriage and briefly quits to work for their neighbours, and to work part-time at a strip club. In series 5, she dates Lee, a fitness instructor who is the catalyst of Pete and Jo's break-up when he sleeps with Jo.

=== Supporting characters ===
Significant supporting roles in the series are played by Rosie Cavaliero (Amy, series 2), Ben Miles (Robert Brown, series 3), Yasmin Bannerman (Jessica Barnes, series 3), Sean Pertwee (Mark Cubitt, series 4–5), Richard Armitage (Lee, series 5), Lucy Robinson (Robyn Duff, series 5–present), and Eve Myles (Caitlin Henderson, series 8).

Doreen Keogh is introduced in series 1, Episode 4 as Pete's mother Audrey Gifford. She makes a cameo appearance in series 3, Episode 1, and reappears in series 4, Episode 4 and series 5, episode 1. The character's recurrence was based on the good chemistry between Keogh and Thomson.

Yasmin Bannerman played local residents' campaigner Jessica in series 3. Bannerman and Bathurst did not know that Jessica and David would have a full-blown affair after their kiss in Episode 3, as David was seen as too much of a "jittery type". The character appears in five episodes. Bathurst was more impressed with the storylines that came out of the affair, rather than the affair itself: "It was the deception, the guilt and the recrimination rather than the actual affair, which was neither interesting nor remarkable".

Series 6 introduced Cel Spellman as the now teenaged Matthew, who in Adam's absence, was raised by his godmother Karen and attended a private school.

== Production ==
=== Writing ===
Mike Bullen has sole writing credit on 26 episodes of the series; four episodes of series 3 were written by David Nicholls, and Bullen co-wrote one episode of series 4 and 5 with Mark Chappell and Matt Greenhalgh respectively. Bullen usually wrote ten pages of script per day, whatever the quality of his writing. His own third draft was usually submitted to the producers as the "first" draft. As he was still an inexperienced writer by the time production of the first series began in January 1998, Bullen was aided by Christine Langan, who pitched in as a script editor. Storylines were planned in advance—the producers knew that they wanted to split up Adam and Rachel at the end of series 1—but the later scripts were written once filming on earlier episodes had already begun. The number of people on the development team varied; the third series' comprised Bullen, Langan, Harries, producer Spencer Campbell, script editor Camilla Campbell, ITV's controller of comedy, and a team of five writers.

Many storylines were based on life experiences of the production team; Bullen and his wife Lisa had their first child in late 1997, which made Bullen identify with the Pete character, whose son is born in the first episode. Bullen incorporated his experiences of the first few months of parenthood into the Pete and Jenny storyline. Adam's testicular cancer storyline in series 2, Episode 5 was influenced by a similar condition that afflicted Harries, and was supplemented by the newspaper columns written by terminal cancer sufferer John Diamond. If a storyline was not drawn from real life experiences, it was researched by communicating with experts; Bullen consulted the relationship support charity Relate for the scenes of Karen and David's marriage guidance session in series 1, episode 5, and consulted Dr Sammy Lee for information about Rachel's intracytoplasmic sperm injection in series 3. When it was decided to have Rachel's abortion lead to her developing Asherman's syndrome in series 3, the British Pregnancy Advisory Service (BPAS) were contacted. BPAS strongly recommended that the plot be developed in a different direction, on the basis that infertility from what would appear to have been a routine abortion would be an "improbable link", though the producers proceeded with their original story anyway.

By the time pre-production on the third series began, Bullen had grown tired of writing the series single-handedly and believed all the stories that could be told had been told. ITV were keen to increase the number of episodes per series to 20 but Granada refused, though did agree to add two more, bringing the total to eight. A writing team of five was assembled, overseen by Bullen. Four of the scriptwriters were deemed not good enough and they parted company with Granada. David Nicholls remained and scripted four of the eight-third series episodes; Bullen wrote the other four and his interest in the series was revived.

At the conclusion of the third series, Bullen announced that he did not want to write a fifth series, and that the fourth would be the last. Series 4, episode 8 was produced as the final episode but the cast and crew realised that they would like to make one final series for proper closure. Bullen agreed to write the final episodes on the condition that there would be just four, and that he could kill off a character. Matt Greenhalgh co-wrote series 5, Episode 3 with Bullen, specifically the scenes depicting Rachel's death. Greenhalgh worked on the script at the same time as he was writing his BBC Three series Burn It, also set in Manchester. In a 2007 interview, he said that he was not a fan of Cold Feet—decrying the depiction of Manchester in the series—and that killing off Rachel was "a privilege".

A reunion episode was speculated after the fifth series ended; in the 2003 documentary Cold Feet: The Final Call, executive producer Andy Harries stated, "By killing a character, you are truly saying 'this series is over' … until, of course, in 10 years time when money is running a bit short for all of us, we bring it back. What we do with Rachel, I don't know yet—but I have got a few theories." In an interview published in October 2003, Harries told The Daily Telegraph that ITV would "probably" bring back Cold Feet ten years after it ended, and said, "There's a tacit understanding with the actors that we will re-visit it again at the appropriate time." In 2007, a tabloid newspaper quoted an ITV "insider" as saying that a reunion episode would be broadcast to mark ten years since the pilot aired. The report turned out to be a fabrication. At the 2010 Edinburgh International Television Festival, Harries stated that discussions about the series' return were "ongoing", but highlighted a number of factors that would prevent a reunion in the near future. The following day, Harries told Kate Silverton that he had held discussions with Mike Bullen about the series returning, but that it would not be back on television screens in 2011 or 2012.

=== Filming ===
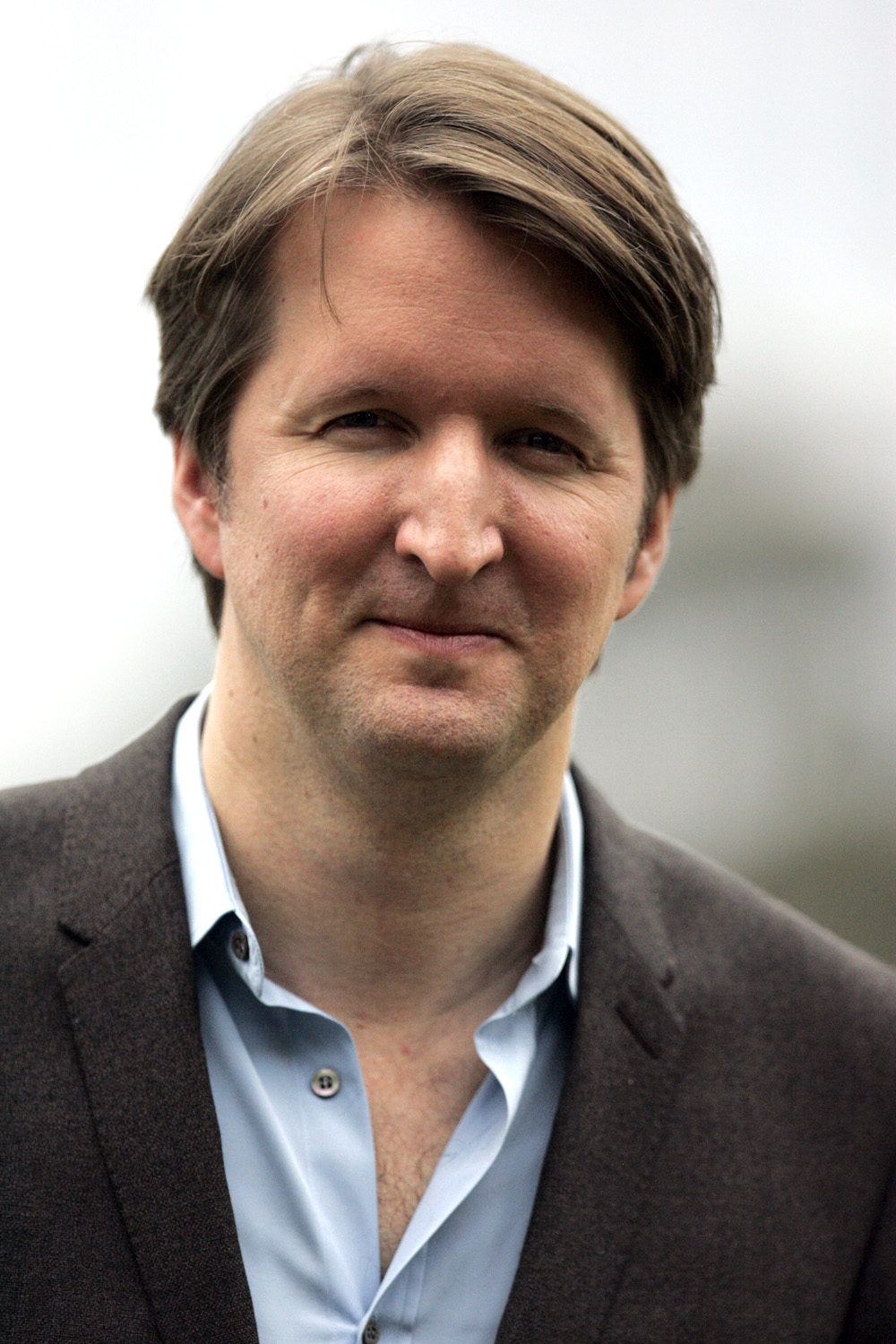
Cold Feet had a number of directors, including Tom Hooper, who directed two episodes of the second series in 1999

All episodes of Cold Feet were shot on film stock on locations in and around Greater Manchester. Sets were designed by Chris Truelove to reflect the characters; Karen and David's home was designed as a spacious detached house intended to be located in Bowdon, while Pete and Jenny and Adam and Rachel had smaller middle-class abodes intended to be located in Didsbury. All exteriors of the characters' houses were shot on location. Christine Langan was keen to avoid a generic sitcom style of filming, citing the formulae of such programmes as "tired and dreary" and lacking emotional depth. To achieve this goal, she and Harries recruited directors with little background in television. These included Nigel Cole, who came from an advertising background and was keen to use the two episodes of the first series he was allotted to "make his mark" and establish himself as a good television director. Other directors included Mark Mylod, Tom Hooper, Tom Vaughan, Pete Travis, Jon Jones, Ciaran Donnelly and Tim Sullivan.

For the first series, interior sets were built at the Blue Shed Studios in Salford. Three directors and three film crews were used to film the six 50-minute episodes over 14 weeks from March to May 1998. Locations included an empty shop unit near Piccadilly station for the charity shop sex scene in Episode 3 and a Masonic Lodge for the gala dinner scenes in Episode 6. In the second year, the sets were moved to the Spectrum Arena in Warrington, where filming ran from March to June. The series featured the first location shoots outside Manchester; a short scene in Episode 2 featuring Bathurst was filmed over half a day in Blackpool; Bathurst, Norris and a small production crew filmed scenes in Paris for Episode 3; exterior location scenes of the characters on holiday in Episode 6 were filmed on Lindisfarne, though the castle interiors were shot at Hoghton Tower. The second series also featured more visual effects; in Episode 5 Adam dreams about being chased by a giant testicle (which was computer-generated) and in Episode 6 a fireworks explosion was supervised by pyrotechnics experts. The testicle dream scene drew mixed reaction. The Mirror's television critic Charlie Catchpole praised it but Robert Bathurst was critical: "I hated that sequence. I thought it was really unfunny. It was a lousy prop and awful graphics and there was too much of it—it would have been much better if it was like a Monty Python foot come smacking down like that and get it over with. You couldn't keep up that surprise and hilarity for all the minutes it was on the screen." By the third series, Cold Feet's sets were permanently located on a Granada warehouse stage and were left intact between series. This meant the basic sets could be used on other Granada programmes, such as The Grimleys and My Beautiful Son. After the final episode was filmed in 2002, the sets were dismantled and taken to a landfill.

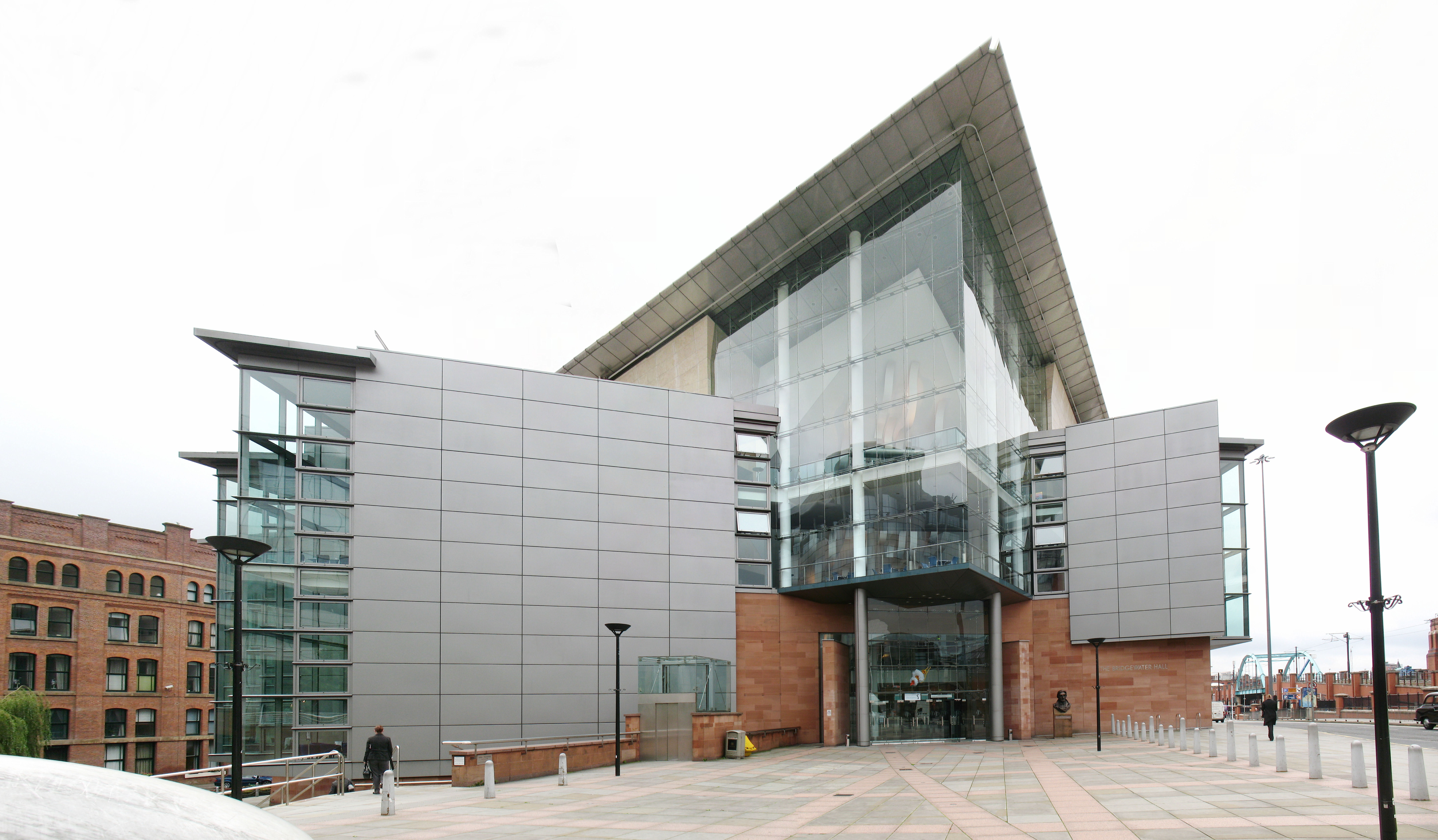
Cold Feet was filmed on location around Manchester, such as at Bridgewater Hall in the city centre

In series 3, Cold Feet shot outside England for the first time for Episode 5. A storyline featuring Adam's stag weekend was originally scripted to take place first in Blackpool and then in Dublin. James Nesbitt suggested that it should be filmed in Belfast and Portrush, near where he grew up. He, Andy Harries and producer Spencer Campbell scouted the locations in April 2000 before filming went ahead later that year. Local businesspeople were so eager to promote the area that they waived any fees Granada would have given them for allowing filming, meaning the location manager only spent £20, considerably less than the £3,000 a typical shoot of that length would have cost. This location shoot inspired the producers to film even further away from Manchester; in November 2000, Bullen and Harries spoke at the Screen Producers Association of Australia conference, where they decided to base the fourth series finale in Sydney. The episode was written to be a "normal episode" of Cold Feet that just had a different background. The main cast—except for Helen Baxendale who was pregnant—the producers and Ciaran Donnelly shot for 18 days in October 2001 in locations that included Hyde Park, Kirribilli, Double Bay and the northern beaches. Budget problems meant an overseas location could not be secured for series 5, so scenes in the final episode were shot in Portmeirion, Wales.

Screen time was divided up equally between the couples over the course of an episode, though occasionally some scenes would run longer; in series 4, episode 3, the scenes of Karen clubbing went on for ten uninterrupted minutes. These scenes were also a rarity for location filming; usually filming in public places was done on a Sunday during closing hours but the clubbing scenes in this episode were filmed during opening hours at the Music Box in Manchester. A hand-held camera was used to enhance the frenetic pace.

=== Music ===
Incidental music for the series was composed by Mark Russell. He also composed a theme tune, which was used as an alternative to Space's "Female of the Species". Christine Langan heard "Female of the Species" on The Chart Show while the pilot was being produced and decided to make it the theme song. She remained involved in choosing popular music used on the show for the three series she worked on it. "Female of the Species" was used as a closing theme throughout the first series. For the second series, it was replaced by Morcheeba's "Let Me See", except for the last episode when John Lennon's "Love" was used. The Mirror's Charlie Catchpole described the diegetic popular music in the school reunion scenes of series 2, Episode 4—"Don't You Want Me" (The Human League), "Relax" (Frankie Goes to Hollywood), "Temptation" (Heaven 17), "True" (Spandau Ballet), "Do You Really Want to Hurt Me" (Culture Club) and "Tainted Love" (Soft Cell)—as "[catching] the changing mood with devastating precision". Catchpole's positive comments about the music led to a previously shelved soundtrack album being released.

== Broadcast ==
The ITV Network Centre originally scheduled the first series to be broadcast in the 10 pm timeslot on Sunday nights. This went against the wishes of Andy Harries, who wanted it broadcast at 9 pm in the so-called "ironing slot"—generally used for programmes that an audience does not have to concentrate on. David Liddiment compromised by allowing the show to start at 9.30 pm. Harries was able to get the second series moved to 9 pm, which annoyed advertisers. The third series remained in the same timeslot but, like other series on the network, suffered from ITV's late decision to add a third advert break to hour-long shows. Episode 8, featuring Adam and Rachel's wedding, was broadcast on Boxing Day—the first time the show was aired on a Tuesday. The eighth episode of series 4 and all four episodes of series 5 were extended to fill a 90-minute timeslot.

The series was repeated when ITV launched digital channel ITV3, then marketed towards over-35 viewers. In the United States, Cold Feet was first broadcast on the cable network Bravo. Bravo bought the pilot and first three series for $1 million. The pilot was broadcast as a "sneak peek" before the regular series run began. From 2005 the series was broadcast by BBC America. When broadcast on SABC 3 in South Africa, the series is retitled Life, Love and Everything Else. Worldwide, it has been broadcast in over 34 countries.

== Reception ==
=== Critical reaction ===
Critical response to the first episode was not favourable; in The Independent, Nicholas Barber called it the most depressing TV programme he had ever seen. He wrote of the six main characters, "Are we supposed to care about these people? The theory, I think, is that we should relate to them, because their lives are as prosaic as our own, and because Cold Feet is a portrait of urban life as it really is in the Nineties. This is another way of saying the writer hasn't bothered with research or imagination." He criticised the conclusion of Episode 1 but praised the other five, which he had seen on preview tapes. On The Late Review, Germaine Greer and Tony Parsons singled out Nesbitt's acting; Greer called him "especially awful" and Parsons wished that he had plunged to his death from the scissor lift Adam appears on at the beginning of the episode. General reaction improved as the first year went on. At the conclusion of the first series, Andrew Billen compared it with Vanity Fair in the Evening Standard and was pleased that it offered a televisual outlet for the "forgotten" twentysomethings. Paul Hoggart for The Times wrote positively of the writing, directing, acting, and editing and looked forward to how Rachel's pregnancy plot would be resolved in the second series.

Other critics hailed it as "the British answer to Thirtysomething"; in 1998, Meg Carter wrote in The Independent, "More than 10 years on, Granada Television has finally produced a modern show that mines the rich seam of a generation that is as confused as it is liberated by increased choice and freedom, and that caters for an audience which has not, traditionally, watched very much ITV." Mark Lawson compared it to the American sitcom Friends, a series that is also based around three men and three women, and featured Helen Baxendale in a guest role. In a 2003 interview with Bullen on BBC Radio 4's Front Row, Lawson asked whether Friends had influenced Cold Feet. Bullen explained that the connection was made by media as "a useful shorthand", that he was irritated by the characters in Friends and "would liked to have taken a baseball bat to them".

In 2001, Andrew Billen compared the contemporary cultural relevance of the series to The Way We Live Now, as a follow-up to his comparison of the first series with Vanity Fair: "In previous years we have seen the anguish caused by infidelity, impotence and infertility. This season the characters face the hazards thrown up by miscarriage, alcoholism and a late-flowering career. Sustaining relationships looks as hard as ever. Yet there is nothing each protagonist wants more than old-fashioned domestic bliss." The review resonated with other critics; in The Scotsman, Linda Watson-Brown wrote an overall positive review of the series in general—dismissing the spate of "anti-Cold Feet" reviews—but criticised "the ease with which problems are resolved and morality used to slap the viewer in the face". The final episode set in Australia polarised critics; in a column focusing on Chewin' the Fat, Scotsman critic Aidan Smith accused the big-budget episode "which somehow managed to squeeze the Harbour Bridge into every shot" of being the point the series jumped the shark, and Times columnist Caitlin Moran complimented it, but was concerned that the series' original main characters—Adam and Rachel—were being sidelined by everyone including Mike Bullen.

When the fifth series began in 2003, critics welcomed its end. Paul Hoggart wrote in The Times that the flashback and fantasy scenes were becoming so overused on television that their use in Cold Feet was less surprising than it was in 1998. In Scotland on Sunday, Helen Stewart lamented the loss of Fay Ripley and Jenny's replacement by "the bland but international crossover-friendly Jo, [...] who is sufficiently pointless to be dismissed even by her fellow characters as 'not as good as Jenny'." Stewart also criticised Hermione Norris's acting and Karen for being a "spoon-faced moaner". A brief article on the MediaGuardian website described a "revisionist backlash" as critics' negative opinions of the series contrasted with the positive reaction that greeted it in 1998.

=== Depiction of social issues ===
Cold Feet's cast and crew were frequently praised for their depiction of real-life social issues on the series. When Cold Feet began, Christine Langan stated, "The real challenge was to overcome the traditional view that many of the issues we cover—jealousy, guilt, money, sexual problems, parental death—are ordinary issues, hardy perennials and, as such, not interesting enough for drama." The fourth episode of the first series was controversial due to its depiction of the characters freely discussing their sex lives; in the left-wing New Statesman, Andrew Billen praised it as a homage to La Ronde and, despite the sex-talk, being "intricately constructed as a farce". A complaint was made by a viewer to the Independent Television Commission—the commercial television regulator—about the depiction of sex, but it was not upheld.

A scene in series 2, episode 4 showing Karen smoking a joint at a dinner party was debated at the writing stage; all scripts were required to be sent to Granada's Compliance department to ensure they maintained the ITC's code of conduct. The department would not allow Karen's drug use to be portrayed without some cost to her, so suggested that Karen and Adam could be arrested while rolling joints at the school reunion. Bullen thought the idea was "ludicrous" so added a scene where David berates Ramona for her drug use. Despite the measures taken, four people complained to the ITC about the glamorisation of drugs. The ITC dismissed the complaints. The scenes of Jo and Audrey smoking cannabis in series 5, Episode 1 drew seven complaints to the ITC by people who thought it would give children the wrong impression of drugs. The ITC dismissed the complaints on the basis that the episode was broadcast after the watershed. Mark Lawson was unappreciative of the scene, writing that the drugs plot was a "forced jollity" compared to the other humorous scenes in the episode.

In series 3, Adam and Rachel seek intracytoplasmic sperm injection (ICSI) when they have trouble conceiving a child naturally. The characters take out bank loans of thousands of pounds to pay for the treatment, which is unsuccessful each time. The producers devised this storyline because IVF was a major contemporary issue and wrote the treatment as a failure because it was representative of the odds of conception in real life.

Rachel's problem with conception is soon diagnosed as being due to "partial Asherman's syndrome", a storyline that runs through series 3 and 4. The plot was analysed on an episode of BBC Radio 4's Woman's Hour. Ann Furedi of BPAS, which had supplied information to the writing team during the research stages, stated that there had not been a recorded case of Asherman's syndrome in the United Kingdom since the Second World War. Further to that, she stated that the consensus among medical groups was that there was no real direct link between abortions and infertility; rather an untreated infection could increase the chances of fertility problems if it interfered with an abortion. Christine Geraghty countered that the factual accuracy of the storyline depended on how the producers wanted to portray the issue to viewers. Her opinion was backed up by an ITV statement, which said that "stories for Cold Feet are not just chosen in order to make people aware of the issues involved; they're also chosen for their dramatic potential and relevance to modern living". Woman's Hour presenter Jenni Murray developed the discussion in an article for The Guardian; she mentioned that no impression was given that Rachel had suffered an incorrectly performed operation or had had to travel to eastern Europe for it, and that it was improbable that Rachel managed to conceive a child after all.

Cold Feet continued to cover social issues when it returned in 2016. The character of Pete was diagnosed with depression. Writer Mike Bullen himself has battled depression.

=== Influence on television ===
In a 2007 feature for The Guardian's G2 supplement, screenwriter Danny Brocklehurst discussed the impact the series has had on British television, including inspiration for one of his programmes, Talk to Me. He opined that until Cold Feet there had not been a significant television series depicting "the wants and needs of ordinary young adults" since Thirtysomething concluded in 1991. Brocklehurst developed Talk to Me in the same manner as Bullen developed Cold Feet, namely by basing its characters on his own experiences and friends. Both Brocklehurst and Mark Lawson have discussed similar "copycat" series, including Hearts and Bones, Metropolis, Couples and Wonderful You. Brocklehurst noted that these series "lacked [Cold Feet's] warmth and believability" adding that they were "unrealistic and cynical". In 2007, Brocklehurst said:

Cold Feet proved that you didn't have to have a high concept to make compelling, heartwarming, sometimes profound drama. And, while the show dealt with issues such as adoption, alcoholism and testicular cancer, it was always at its most successful when bouncing playfully between the three couples, neatly exposing the differences between men and women.

Over four years after Cold Feet ended, ITV executives were still looking for a series that could comfortably replace it. On his appointment as chairman of ITV plc in 2007, Michael Grade announced that he wanted the ITV network to be broadcasting long-running series like Cold Feet to attract the younger, upmarket viewing demographic.

In 2008, BBC One broadcast Mutual Friends, a six-part television series written by Anil Gupta, which was compared to Cold Feet. While the BBC wanted the series to match the success of Cold Feet, producer Rob Bullock stressed that "Cold Feet is about a different period of life. It's about people in their early thirties. Mutual Friends moves things on—what's happening to our characters as they approach 40 is very different. Why do so many lives fall apart at 40? Because things haven't worked out how we hoped and we've had to turn to Plan B. The drama is all about the crisis caused by things not turning out as the characters planned." Later in 2008, ITV commissioned Married Single Other, a comedy drama executive-produced by Andy Harries and directed by Declan Lowney, about three contemporary couples living in Leeds.

Granada Entertainment USA, the American arm of Granada Productions, tendered the series format to American networks and cable channels from late 1997. The format was sold to NBC, which commissioned 13 × 60-minute episodes in May 1999 for the fall season, to be produced in association with Kerry Ehrin Productions. The American series starred David Sutcliffe as Adam Williams and Jean Louisa Kelly as Shelley Sullivan (the Rachel role). Low ratings lead to the series being cancelled after four episodes. In 2003 the format was sold to Italian network Mediaset for a 2004 broadcast. In 2008, Polish broadcaster TVN secured the rights to a remake from Granada International. This version, entitled Usta, usta, is set in Warsaw. The thirteen-episode series began filming in May 2009 and was broadcast from 6 March 2010. An adaptation entitled Přešlapy has also been developed for television audiences in the Czech Republic. The creators intend the show to run for three series of 13 episodes and tell a story over seven years. The first series was broadcast from September 2009.

=== Awards and nominations ===
During and after its original run, Cold Feet won over 20 major awards. For its first year, Cold Feet received three British Comedy Award nominations; the series won in the Best TV Comedy Drama category and Nesbitt and Ripley were respectively nominated for Best TV Comedy Actor and Best TV Comedy Actress. The series also won the Royal Television Society Programme Award for Situation Comedy & Comedy Drama, and the Broadcasting Press Guild Award for Best Entertainment. For the second series, it received four British Academy Television Award (BAFTA) nominations—Best Drama Series, Best Original Television Music, Best Graphic Design, and Best Editing (Fiction/Entertainment). At the Television and Radio Industries Club Awards it won TV Comedy Programme of the Year, and a second Best TV Comedy Drama award at the British Comedy Awards. The awards for the television industry magazine Broadcast presented it with the Drama: Series or Serial award. In year three, Fay Ripley became the only actor to receive a BAFTA nomination for their work on the series; she was nominated for Best Actress. At the BAFTA Craft awards, David Nicholls was nominated in the New Writer (Fiction) category, and Jon Jones was nominated in the New Director (Fiction) category. It lost out on four British Comedy Award nominations (Nesbitt and Thomson for Best TV Comedy Actor, Norris for Best TV Comedy Actress, and the third series for Best TV Comedy Drama) but won the People's Choice Award (a viewer poll). The series also scored an International Emmy Award drama nomination. Series 4 won the BAFTA for Best Drama Series and the National Television Award for Most Popular Comedy Programme. At the British Comedy Awards 2003, Series 5 won Best TV Comedy Drama and Mike Bullen was named Writer of the Year.

== Merchandise ==
Four non-fiction tie-in books have been released by Granada Media, an imprint of André Deutsch Publishing. 2000 saw the release of Cold Feet: The Best Bits (ISBN 0-233-99924-8) and Cold Feet: A Man's/Woman's Guide to Life (ISBN 0-233-99732-6). The Best Bits, compiled by Geoff Tibballs, features script extracts and behind-the-scenes information from directors, producers and actors in the first two series. A Man's/Woman's Guide to Life, compiled by Jonathan Rice, is in a "flip-book"-style format, and is presented as if written by the characters. It features backstories for the characters, drawn from Bullen's scripts for the first two series. The Little Book of Cold Feet: Life Rules (ISBN 0-233-05088-4), a book of quotes from the series, was compiled by Rice and released in 2003. The same year, The Complete Cold Feet Companion (ISBN 0-233-00999-X) by Rupert Smith, featuring interviews with the actors and production staff, was released. The book sold 961 copies in the first week of publication, making tenth position on the hardback non-fiction chart.

Five soundtracks have been released, featuring music from the series. Global TV released Cold Feet: The Official Soundtrack on two CDs in 1999. The soundtrack had been shelved before release but was put back on the schedule when Mirror journalist Charlie Catchpole wrote a column that desired for it to be released. Global followed the first OST with More Cold Feet in 2000. In 2001, UMTV released the two-disc soundtrack Cold Feet, followed by The Very Best of Cold Feet in 2003. Cheatwell Games issued a licensed board game in 2001.

All series have been released on DVD in the United Kingdom and Australia, by Video Collection International and Universal respectively. Series 1–3 have been released in the United States by Acorn Media. A collection of all five series was released in the United Kingdom in 2003. A version exclusive to Play.com had a bonus disc that contained the retrospective documentary Cold Feet: The Final Call, new interviews with John Thomson, Andy Harries and Spencer Campbell, and a locations featurette presented by Thomson. This 11-disc version had a general release when Granada Ventures re-released all five series in new packaging in 2006. All DVD and VHS releases of series 5 have been edited from the original four episodes into six episodes of various lengths.

The pilot and first series was made available as streaming media on ITV plc's revamped itv.com website from 2007 to 2009. All episodes have been available from ITV's iTunes Store since 2008.

DVD	Release date		
DVD	Region 2	Region 1	Region 4
The Pilot and Complete 1st Series	25 September 2000	25 January 2005	4 February 2002
The Complete 2nd Series	16 October 2000	26 April 2005	5 December 2006
The Complete 3rd Series	5 November 2001	26 July 2005	2 February 2007
The Complete 4th Series	25 November 2002		3 April 2007
The Complete 5th Series	24 March 2003		1 June 2007
