= David Liddiment =

BBC Trustee

David Liddiment (born 20 September 1952) is Creative Director of the independent production company All3Media. He is also an associate of The Old Vic Theatre Company and a member of the BBC Trust, the governing body of the British Broadcasting Corporation.

Liddiment was director of programmes and channels at ITV (1997–2002), a role in which he was portrayed by actor Risteárd Cooper in the ITV drama Quiz in 2020. He was also head of entertainment at the BBC (1993–1995). His programme commissions included Pop Idol, Fat Friends, and Men Behaving Badly. While working for Granada Television, he was an executive producer on Coronation Street (1987–1991).

In 2003, Liddiment was presented with the Royal Television Society's Gold Medal for outstanding services to television.

On 1 November 2006, Liddiment was appointed as one of the founding members of the BBC Trust, which along with a formal Executive Board replaced the former BBC Board of Governors as the governing body of the BBC. He served for two term which expires on October 2014.

Liddiment is chairman of the Trust's Audiences and Performance Committee, which monitors the performance of all of the BBC's public services (television, radio and online).

In September 2015, Liddiment became a non-executive director of FremantleMedia in the UK.Liddiment lives in west London with Michael Denardo (b. 29 May 1960, USA).
