= Essen (surname) =

Essen is a German surname.

== People ==
Notable people with the surname include:

- August Franz Essen (1720–1792), Saxonian diplomat
- Hans Henric von Essen (1755–1824), Swedish officer, courtier and statesman
- Louis Essen (1908–1997), English physicist
- Marija Essen (1872–1956), Bolshevik revolutionary and writer
- Nikolai Essen (1860–1915), Russian naval commander and admiral
- Siri von Essen (1850–1912), Swedish/Finnish actress, married to August von Strindberg 1877–91
- Thomas Von Essen (born 1954), commissioner of the New York City Fire Department

== Fictional characters ==
- Sarah Essen, a DC Comics Batman character, the second wife of Commissioner Jim Gordon

== See also ==
- Essen (disambiguation)
- Essen family
- Van Essen
- Von Essen
