= Van Essen =

Van Essen is a Dutch toponymic surname, meaning "from Essen". It may refer to:

== People ==
- Arthur van Essen (born 1938), Dutch linguist
- C.C. van Essen (1899–1963), Dutch classical archaeologist
- David Van Essen (born 1945), American neuroscientist
- Frank van Essen (born 1967), Dutch drummer and violinist
- Gerard van Essen (1924–1997), Dutch clown
- Henk van Essen (born 1960), Dutch policeman
- Jan van Essen (c.1640–1684), Flemish landscape painter
- Jörg van Essen (born 1947), German politician
- Karin van Essen-Moos (born 1961), Dutch tennis player
- Kevin van Essen (born 1989), Dutch football player
- Sharon van Essen (born 1981), Dutch cyclist
- Tamsin van Essen, English ceramicist

== See also ==
- Essen (disambiguation)
- Essen (surname)
- Von Essen
- Essen family
