= Van Es =

Van Es is a Dutch toponymic surname, literally translating to "from the ash tree". Alternatively, a family may have originated from Esch in North Brabant. Variants are Van Esch, Van Ess People with this name include:

Van Es

- Adri van Es (1913–1994), Dutch vice-admiral and state secretary of defence
- Andrée van Es (born 1953), Dutch GreenLeft politician
- Bart van Es (born 1972), British scholar and literary academic
- Ed van Es (born 1959) Dutch water-polo player
- Hubert van Es (1941–2009) Dutch photographer
- Jacob Foppens van Es (c.1596–1666), Flemish still-life painter
- Joost van Es (born 1968), Dutch violinist and singer
- Kika van Es (born 1991), Dutch football defender
- Ronny van Es (born 1978), Dutch footballer
- Wim van Es (born 1934), Dutch archaeologist

Van Esch

- Nicolaus van Esch (1507–1578), Dutch Roman Catholic theologian and mystical writer

Van Ess

- Johann Heinrich van Ess (1772–1847), German Catholic theologian
- John van Ess (1879–1949), American missionary in Iraq

== See also ==
- Van Essen
