= Kokki (disambiguation) =

Kokki is a Japanese historical text purported to have been written in 620 by Shōtoku Taishi and Soga no Uma.

Kokki may lso refer to:

- Kokki (film), 2006 Indian Tamil-language film
- Kokki Karan, Indian actor
- Comedy actor of the Netherlands Peppi & Kokki duo
- Väinö Kokki, fictional detective from the Finnish comedy films including The Stars Will Tell, Inspector Palmu
