= H401 =

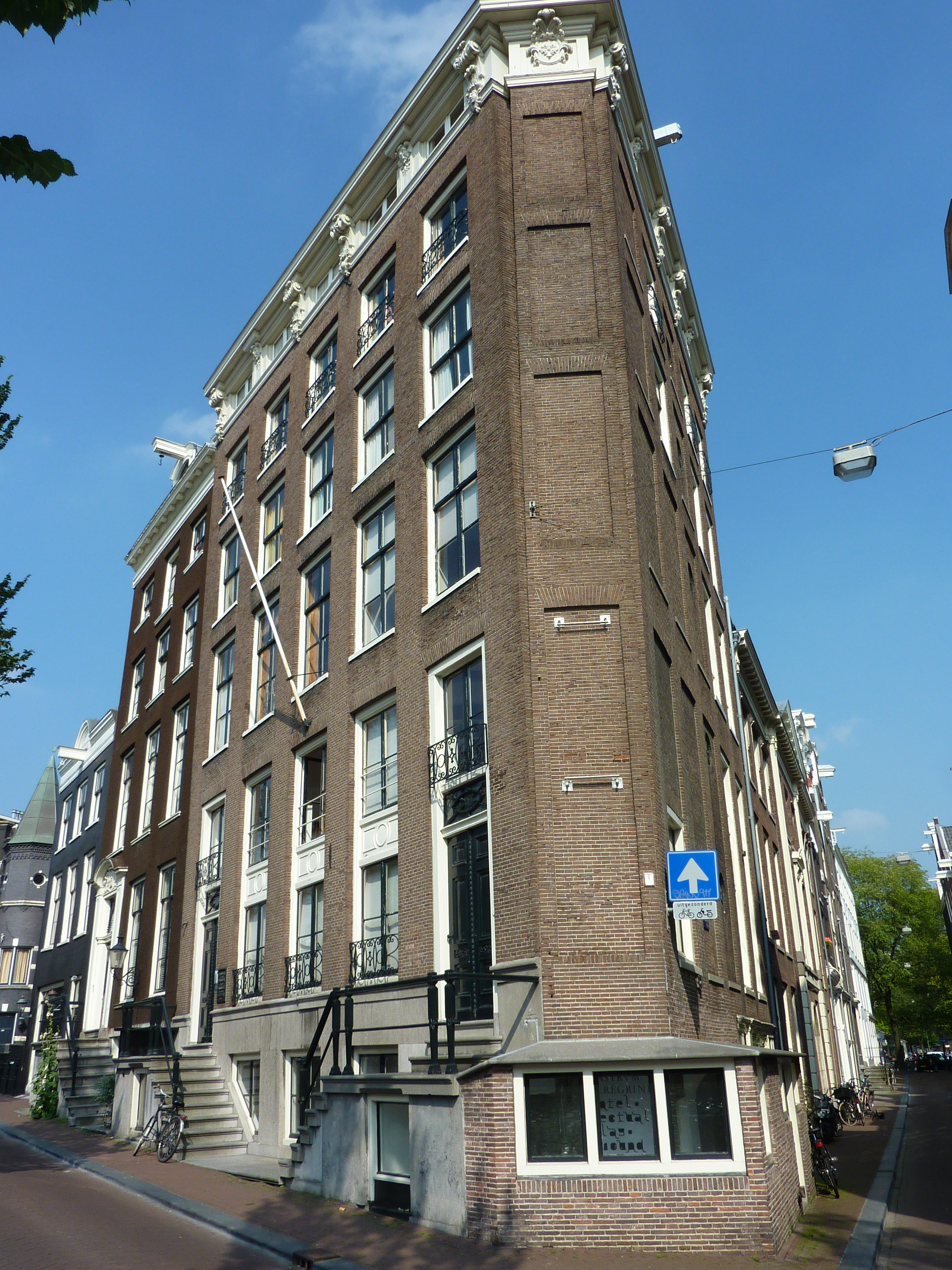
Amsterdam, Herengracht 401

H401 (Castrum Peregrini), officially Stichting Herengracht 401, was known as Castrum Peregrini until 2019, is a private cultural foundation located in the Herengracht building of the late artist Gisèle d’Ailly van Waterschoot van der Gracht (1912 - 2013), Amsterdam. It has roots in the World War II during which Gisèle's flat at Herengracht 401 served as a hiding place for Jewish youngsters. H401's multiple layers of history come together in thematic years programmes and projects, both at the local and international level. For several years now the foundation has explored themes such as Vulnerability to Group Fanaticism, Freedom, Friendship, Collective Memory, the Female Perspective, Diversity (Perplex), Masculinity(ies) and Archival Power. With these programmes rich in artists' intervention, academic inputs, research and public talks, H401 strives for a continuous deepening of issues relating to second class citizenship, homogenic narratives of the past, contested heritage as well as legacy of colonialism and totalitarian regimes. Art, Research and Dialogue are then at the core of the foundation. Through artistic means and devices, H401 promotes a thriving cultural programme that encompasses themes of memory and (contested) heritage resonating with diverse communities.

== History of the foundation ==
=== Gisèle's childhood and teenage years ===
Gisèle van Waterschoot van der Gracht was born in The Hague on September 11, 1912. She was the youngest of four children: Ides, Arthur and Walter. Her father, Willem van Waterschoot van der Gracht, was of Dutch origin and he worked as a geologist across the world for diverse Dutch companies. Her mother, Josephine von Hammer Purgstall, was an Austrian baroness. Gisèle spent the first three years of her life in The Netherlands and then together with her family she relocated to the United States of America due to her father's work. Throughout her childhood and young years, Gisèle and the rest of her family were rigorously exposed to Catholicism. Similarly to her mother, Gisèle attended the boarding school run by the sisters of The Sacred Heart when living in the U.S.A.

In 1928, Gisèle and her parents travelled back to Europe and to Hainfeld's castle in Austria, property of her mother's family. Due to the move, Gisèle's formal education at the boarding school came to an end. However, in 1930 she began to pursue a Fine Art education at Académie Julian, in Paris. At the Académie de la Grande Chaumière, Gisèle received lessons from Bernard Naudin. The study mainly involved working with models. At Edouard Henri Léon’s studio she learned the various techniques of etching and engraving. Her examination piece, a large print after a self-portrait by Jean-Honoré Fragonard entitled L’Inspiration, gained her a Mention Honorable, Section Gravure at the 1931 Salon. Other exhibitions followed.

=== The war period – Castrum Peregrini as safe house ===
After a period of travelling between The Netherlands and the US, she established herself in first Limburg (L) and later in Bergen, North Holland (ML). In those years, she became acquainted with the renowned stained glass painter Joep Nicolas and his family.

Following 1934, Gisèle devoted herself to her artistic practice; it was in 1937 that she made her debut in the Netherlands at the exhibition “Hedendaagsche Limburgsche Kunst”, The Hague. She was represented with five paintings and a series of illustrations taken from her Paris sketchbook. In 1939 she had her own studio and received her first independent commission for seven stained glass windows in the church of Oostrom, Limburg. During these years rich with personal connection and exposure to the art scene, Gisèle met the artist Adriaan Roland Holst. It is through the latter that Gisèle made the acquaintance of the poet Wolfgang Frommel who had emigrated from Germany. Although he was not of Jewish origin, he left the country shaken by its drastic turn in politics and ideology.

Despite their declared neutrality, the Netherlands was invaded on May 10, 1940 by Nazi Germany. Around that time, Gisèle rented one of the flats in the corner building at Herengracht 401. The Herengracht had always been dear to her as it was the canal where her grandparents had lived. Additionally, the Amsterdam art scene offered more opportunities for artistic assignments. Gisèle began this way her life in the Herengracht 401. As from 1942, the flat hosted Wolfgang Frommel too and shelter was given to two young boys of Jewish origins: Buri Wongtschowski and Claus Victor Bock, respectively 23 and 16 years old at that time. Frommel knew about them given his connection to the Quaker School in Ommen, Overijssel (NL), where Buri was a teacher (painting and drawing) and Claus a pupil. Nevertheless, due to the racial laws and increasing restrictions, they were forced to go into hiding. After several intermediary stops, first Buri came to Herengracht 401 followed a few months later by Claus. Gisèle was aided by the neighbours on the floor above hers, Guido Teunissen and Miep Benz, who offered the possibility to rent a bed for Claus. The other floors of the building were rented out to different tenants who did not, and could not, become aware of the presence of the two “illegals” living in Gisèle's apartment.

Among the hiders and their keeper's network, the flat in Herengracht 401 became known as ‘Castrum Peregrini’, The Castle of the Pilgrim, taking such name after the early 13th-century castle in Israel. The castle was founded and defended by the Order of the Templars during the Crusades. Notwithstanding the multiple attacks, the castle was never taken and it continued offering refuge to pilgrims. Similarly to the original Castrum, the Dutch one hosted diverse people in need among which Simon van Keulen. However, Buri and Claus stayed there the whole duration of World War II.

Throughout the war, Gisèle economically provided for the house which proved to be difficult as she was not allowed to accept official assignments, publicly expose, or sell her work. As she decided not to sign up for the Nazi Chamber of Culture (Nederlandsche Kultuurkamer), her working possibilities were drastically reduced. On their end, Buri and Claus filled their days with art and poetry: sketching each other, translating poems or creating new ones. The war times created a unique bond among the four inhabitants of Gisèle's flat, a strong relationship that grew old with them. Including a network of (often) artistic friends they found themselves surrounded by, among these people: e.g. Max Beckmann.

Among Frommel and the people in hiding, as well as with other selected friends, a new type of bond started developing under the banner of pedagogical eros. As Annet Mooij describes it: “this 'pedagogical eros' was a popular concept in German reform pedagogy of the early twentieth century. It referred to ancient Greek culture, in which boyish love or pederasty – the erotic relationship between an adult man and a growing boy – was a normal phenomenon and was considered an important element in the education of an (aristocratic) boy. [...] Depending on the inclinations of the educator, the erotic element could be limited to a chaste passion or a longing at a distance, but could also take the form of an actual sexual encounter or relationship, legitimised by Greek principles.” Frommel became acquainted with it via the work of the German poet Stefan George whom he looked up to as a literary model. Such pedagogy manifested itself via reading sessions and intimate gatherings to which Gisèle was not welcomed.

=== The aftermath – Castrum Peregrini, as a German Publishing House ===
Liberation day came on May 5, 1945, and for Gisèle, Frommel, Buri and Claus a new freedom was found and they all parted different ways. Following Gisèle's story closer, soon after the end of the war she had the chance to reunite with her family. Her father had died during wartime (1943), but her mother in the Netherlands and two brothers in the U.S. were still alive. In June 1945 she was reunited with Ides in Amsterdam, who served as a high ranked American officer in the American army as part of the liberation of Europe. For a short period, she went back to America with her brothers, and while there she supported the fund for Dutch art in the aftermath of the war. Gisèle was invited for an exhibition in Schaeffer Galleries, New York, that took place in 1946. She introduced three of her friends: Simon van Keulen, Peter Goldschmidt and Haro op ‘T Veldt. In the frame of this exhibition the fundraising campaign “Let Dutch Art Flower again” (New York, U.S.A.) started, in 1946 she gave her first lecture “Art Underground” which retraced the years of the occupation and Gisèle's own story in Herengracht 401. Such an event marked a turning point in Gisèle's career as new exhibitions and invitations followed this up.

Parallel to Gisèle's growing work assignments and reputation in the post-war years, Gisèle had several exhibitions and built further on her reputation as a renowned stained glass painter, in 1952 Frommel returned to Amsterdam, to the Herengracht and with a circle of close friends he gave life to the German publishing house Castrum Peregrini, based at the Herengracht 401. The publishing had a strong focus on the Geistesgeschichte, in other words, they devoted their research to very specific, often little known, branch of history and cultural manifestations.

Although Gisèle had financially supported the activities of the publishing house as well as its own career, it was only in 1957 that she had sufficient funds to buy the entire Herengracht 401 building. Due to the inheritance received after her mother's death (1955), Gisèle was no longer tied to extreme financial needs, she was able to explore different art and painting expressions.

The dynamics at the Herengracht 401 were then the following: the building hosted the office of the publishing house, private rooms of some of its employees, a common dining room, Frommel's apartment and the top floors as living quarters of Gisèle, which were shared with Arnold Jan d’Ailly. He was the former mayor of Amsterdam and the two of them married in 1959. In the years following the marriage, Gisèle stayed from the spring to the late summer in Paros, Greece, where together with Arnold she had rehabilitated an isolated monastery in ruins into their residency. Arnold had died in 1967. In 1982, after a year based in London, Gisèle settled herself back in Amsterdam, although she kept travelling extensively during her whole further life. In 1988, she had an exhibition at the Galerie Utermann in Dortmund.

The following decades were marked by the deaths of the core group of the Castrum inhabitants. Frommel died in 1986 and Buri in 1999. In the meantime, Manuel Goldschmidt had taken over the publishing house until Michael Defuster became the new director in 1998.

=== Late 90's – early 2000s, Castrum Peregrini: Intellectual Playground ===
Despite the losses, these years in Gisèle's persona and work receive increasingly more recognition. Starting with the documentary “Het steentje van Gisèle” (1997, ‘Uur van de Wolf’ by van Cees van Ede and Maud Keus) gave her the chance to share with the wider public her life and career.

In 1998, she received the Righteous Among Nations, a recognition issued by the Yad Vashem – The World Holocaust Remembrance Centre (Israel) as non-Jewish person that protected Jews during the Nazi persecution.

In January 2008, a major change took place within the foundation its publishing activities were discontinued and the organisation became a public cultural centre taking the name Castrum Peregrini - Intellectual Playground. The new programme focused on the intersection between artistic research with the core values: vrijheid vriendschap en cultuur (freedom, friendship and culture). In the same year, the exhibition "Gisèle en haar onderduikers" (Gisèle and her people in hiding) at NIOD came to life, initiated by Dr. Erik Somers and Michael Defuster. A number of lectures took place in the exhibition at NIOD and the homonymous publication came out.

A new set of board members was appointed and from 2012 the new foundation was run by Frans Damman, Michael Defuster and Lars Ebert. Thematic year programmes were organised and a series of young talent exhibitions took place in the house like a few years of a row of ‘Selected’ by the new generation of artists just graduated from the Gerrit Rietveld Academy.

Following a hospitalisation due to a fall, Gisèle died on May 27, 2013.

=== H401 ===
In 2013, Joke Haverkorn van Rijsewijk came forward with a personal portrayal of Frommel and its environment in her book “Entfernte Erinnerungen an W”. In the framework of Haverkorn's publication, H401 organised the symposium Friendship - A History of Trust in December 2013. The event was organised in collaboration with the Duitsland Instituut Amsterdam and the University of Amsterdam within the thematic year programme de Vriend (The Friend). The programme was the following: Ute Frevert, at the time director of the renowned Max Planck Institute for Education Research Berlin, will talk about her research for her recently published book "Eine Geschichte des Vertrauens" (Friendship - A History of Trust). Ute Oelmann, at that time director of the Stefan George Archiv Stuttgart, introduced Georges’ concept of friendship that inspired Wolfgang Frommel to maintain a circle of friends, later known as Castrum Peregrini. The first two conversations with Ute Frevert, Josef Früchtl (author) and Ute Oelmann were moderated by Joachim Umlauf, director of the Goethe Institut Bucharest. The symposium concluded with a discussion with Joke Haverkorn van Rijswijk about Wolfgang Frommel and his friendships, in connection with her publication, moderated by Nicole Colin, Professor at the University of Amsterdam.

It was in 2017 that the word abuse (misbruik) was used by one of the people close to Frommel's circle: Frank Ligtvoet. Following this allegation towards Frommel and some of the close friends of the Castrum Peregrini, independent research was conducted by the team of the foundation. They invited Frans Bauduin as chair to set up his research committee. The research was conducted on the history of Castrum Peregrini in the years spanning from 1942 to 1986. The investigation and the commission concluded that it can be assumed that Frommel was guilty of abusing young men and women.

Although a strong bond between the two was established during the war, Gisèle was by no means Frommels's patron nor a confidant. It is unclear the extent to which Gisèle was aware of the abuse taking place at Herengracht 401 as she was excluded from the circle's activities and was often abroad. The commission and the foundation board acknowledged that Gisèle must have been aware of certain behaviours among the circle.

This investigation took place after both Gisèle and Frommel died, as well as after Castrum Peregrini had established itself as a cultural foundation rather than a publishing house. As the legacy of the publishing activities was not continued by the current board, the commission made several recommendations, among which was changing the name of the foundation to make clear to the audience what changes had already took place in the last years. In 2019, it was decided to shift the name from Castrum Peregrini-Intellectual Playground to H401. In contrast to the previous name which held in itself the need for secrecy and disguise, H401 - short for Herengracht 401 - relates to the location and identity of the foundation dealing with its complex and multi-facetted history of the house where lives have been saved and also where lives have been damaged. Its current activities centre around art, research and dialogue.

On the foundation website it is possible to access the full report issued by the Commission Baudin (in Dutch) as well as its summary and the ten recommendations issued (in German).

== H401 Projects ==
=== 2024 – 2026, Contested Desires: Constructive Dialogues ===
Co-funded by the European Union.

Contested Desires: Constructive Dialogues (CDCD) is a pioneering transnational project consisting of 19 global partners. It aims to unravel the influence of our shared colonial past on cultural identities today. CDCD stands out for its collaborative approach with communities and cultural places. During the three-year project, 17 artist residencies opportunities for artists will be organized to facilitate the production of new artworks around the legacy of European colonialism and its traces in today's cultural scene.

=== 2019 – 2024, Questioning Traumatic Heritage: Spaces of Memory in Europe, Argentina, Colombia (SPEME) ===
Co-funded by the European Union's Horizon 2020 Research and Innovation Programme under the Marie Skłodowska-Curie grant.

SPEME took as its specific object of investigation a various array of spaces of memory, such as museums, former detention camps and sites of commemoration, to investigate how various traumatic pasts can be preserved and transmitted through space. The project relied on a continuous exchange between universities and the cultural sector, allowing this way the conversation on traumatic past and complex heritage sites to be discussed by academics, researchers, cultural mediators as well as diverse communities from Argentina, Colombia, Italy and The Netherlands.

The core element of the project were its secondment: a month-long exchange the partners did in the countries involved in the consortium. During the weeks the participants followed activities organised by the hosting partner (e.g. workshops or seminars), conducted field research and worked on several publications available here in the Heritage, Memory and Conflict Journal (University of Amsterdam)

=== 2021 – 2022, Amplify: Make the Future of Europe Yours ===
Co-funded by the European Parliament.

Amplify aimed at collecting ideas, issues and feedback about how the cultural sector can be more inclusively represented in Europe. Under the supervision of H401, Creative Court and Het Geluid Maastricht, bachelor students from the International Arts Programme at the Zuyd University of Applied Sciences (Maastricht) and Photography Degree at The Royal Academy of Art (KABK) in The Hague collaborated with underrepresented communities to bring forward their voices to the wider audience. The young artists collaboratively worked on a set of artistic recommendations that were submitted to the Platform of the Conference on the Future of Europe on 9 October. These recommendations concerned a diverse range of topics: climate crisis, environmentalism, GIG economy or protection of sex workers.

The project culminated on Europe Day, May 9, 2022, The final Amplify in Action gathered all the project's Hubs from 12 countries to strategize and execute a live, guerilla-style social media campaign directed to policymakers, cultural leaders and EU institutions.

=== 2018-2020, Heritage Contact Zone (HCZ) ===
Co-funded by the Creative Europe Programme of the European Union.

HCZ drew on the complexity of European history: its accomplishment, and cultural flourishing accompanied by chapters of colonial and totalitarian violence as well social injustice and marginalisation of “other” communities. In this scenario, cultural mediators and artists were pivotal in addressing contested heritage and narratives of the past to transform zones of tension into zones of contact.

Outcomes and highlights of the project are bundled in the Heritage Contact Zone Toolkit designed to help practitioners to use a heritage site as a space of dialogue and encounter towards more inclusive, multi-vocal and creative narratives that constitute our collective memory and cultural identification.

=== 2016 – 2018, The European Academy of Participation ===
Co-funded by Erasmus+ Strategic Partnership Project.

The European Academy of Participation (EAP) brought together 10 partners from all over Europe, including higher education institutions and arts and culture organisations. The project aimed to make a contribution to a more inclusive Europe, in which people live together in mutual respect of their differences. Within EAP, participatory practice in art and culture represented a central tool to involve communities in a positive process of constructing a shared cultural space.

Through essays, conversations and journal entries, the final publication European Academy of Participation – Benchmarks, reflections and challenging practice on the interface between academia and the creative sectoroffers an extensive overview of the project's ambitions and outcomes.

=== 2013 – 2015, Silent Heroes ===
Co-funded by the LifeLongLearning Programme of the European Commission.

Silent Heroes brought together organisations in the field of Holocaust memory and adult learning about the World War II. These players shared an interest in the history of hiding and the role of oral history in a learning environment that fosters active participation of learners in Museum settings. The Silent Heroes aimed to build a platform for exchange on the subject of hiding in museum-, memory- and learning environments.

On October 13, 2015, H401 held the Symposium – Silent heroes, Invisible Networks. Together with the active participation of the public, speakers Marjan Schwegman (former director NIOD), Nienke Venema (director Stichting Democratie en Media) and Avraham Burg (author, former speaker of the Knesset) discussed the role of helpers and rescuers during World War II.

=== 2012 – 2014, TimeCase. Memory in Action – Participatory Practices and Low Residency in Art Education ===
Co-funded by the LifeLongLearning Programme of the European Commission.

The network of organisations, groups and individuals involved in TimeCase were interested in participatory arts and 20th century memory practices. The project saw participation as a tool to involve communities in a positive, inclusive process of memory construction: non-populist, moderate, pro-European and culturally inclusive.

By conducting practice-based, comparative review of innovative educational/creative approaches relating to 20th century history, TimeCase aimed to set new standards for open learning environments and participatory approaches in the cultural heritage sector and develop new participatory approaches through peer coaching. Time Case was the precursor of The European Academy of Participation.

=== 2011 - 2012, Tandem Project ===
The Tandem project aimed at building new and long-term collaborative relations between selected organizations from European Union countries and cultural key players from neighbouring countries. The first edition of Tandem in 2011 involved Ukraine and the Republic of Moldova. H401 was paired with the Centre for Humanities within the University of Liviv (Ukraine).

The project was accompanied by the exhibition My Future Heritage which documents artistic intervention in cultural heritage or memory sites that are off the beaten track, neglected or simply not accessible. These sites share a strong potential for future public use that can incentivise the reception of our present through historical lenses, creating new spaces for awareness and dialogues.

=== 2009 - 2011, Jewish Education Traditions in Europe (JETE) ===
Co-funded by the LifeLongLearning Programme of the European Commission.

Rooted in the field of adult education JETE reflected on the themes of migration, inclusion, freedom and tolerance through the lenses of cross disciplinary cultural tools. H401 conducted a series of lectures on Spinoza aimed at exploring the philosopher's thoughts on tolerance and their possible adaptation in our society

== Memberships ==
Throughout the years H401 has joined the following networks:

=== Culture Action Europe (CAE) ===
CAE is the only cross-sectoral network representing all sub-sectors in culture: from performing arts, literature, visual arts, design and cross-arts initiatives to community centres and more through over 210 members from more than 30 countries.

=== Community Arts Network (CAN) ===
A global platform that aims to enable, engage and empower individuals, organisations and communities through arts and unlikely alliances to generate meaningful change and shape a humane future, together.

=== ICOM - ICMEMOHRI (International Committee of Memorial and Human Rights Museums) ===
It strives to build a responsible memory of the past and strengthen the cultural cooperation among the institutions adopting knowledge in the interest of peace. This ICOM (International Council of Museums) branch commemorates victims of the State, of socially determined and ideologically motivated crimes.

=== ICOM – DEMHIST (Demeures Historiques – Historical Houses) ===
This specific ICOM International Committee devotes its attention to the conservation and management of house museums. In particular, it aims at developing standards for the conservation, restoration and security of house museums and at the same time it strives to foster communication between professionals and visitors of the house museums.

=== International Coalition of Sites of Conscience ===
A global network of historic sites, museums, and memorials that are dedicated to the promotion and protection of human rights, and transnational justice across the world.

=== Kunsten ’92 ===
Kunsten ’92 is the interest group for the entire cultural and creative sector composed of more than 440 members from all disciplines, from the arts to new media, design, museums and monuments, and from makers to organizations. Their goal is to strengthen the social and political climate for culture in the Netherlands.

=== Perform Europe ===
Funding scheme for the European performing arts sector which facilitates international networking and supports inclusive, diverse, and green touring projects across the 40 Creative Europe countries.

=== WO2NET ===
Stichting WO2Net is a knowledge and innovation centre sharing stories of the Second World War and its relevance for the present. It aims to connect these stories to a wide audience and communicate with policymakers about the underdeveloped themes and how to reach diverse layers of society.
