= Godefridus Johannes Hoogewerff =

Art historian

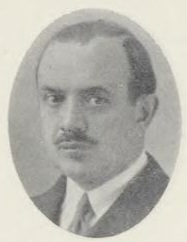
Godefridus Johannes Hoogewerff

Godefridus Johannes Hoogewerff (1884-1963) was a Dutch art historian.

== Life ==
Born in Amersfoort and studying in that town's gymnasium, from 1903 to 1908 he studied at the University of Utrecht, during which time he catalogued the manuscripts of that city's Aartsbischoppelijk Museum. In 1909 he made his first visit to Rome, basing himself at the Nederlands Historisch Instituut te Rome whilst he researched his doctoral dissertation on Dutch painters working in Italy in the 16th century, supervised by Willem Vogelsang, whose assistant Hoogewerff had become in 1908. He gained his doctorate in 1912 but stayed on at the Instituut, eventually in 1923 becoming its director.

He also researched Dutch illuminated manuscripts and early Dutch painting and from 1922 to 1925 he and A. W. Byvanck edited the three-volume Noord-Nederlandsche Miniaturen. He also specialised in Jan van Scorel, publishing a French-language monograph on him in 1923 and another in Dutch in 1941. His initial retirement in 1950 did not prevent him becoming Professor in Iconography and Early Christian Art at the University of Utrecht, whilst his second retirement four years later proved the catalyst for his foundation of the Dutch Institute for Art History in Florence, where he had settled and later died.

== Fame ==
As an art historian, Hoogewerff gained international fame by being one of the first to define iconology (as distinct from the simpler iconography) as his own specialism at the Sixth International Congress of History in Oslo in 1928, reverting to the use of the term iconology by Aby Warburg in 1912.
