= Gisèle d'Ailly van Waterschoot van der Gracht =

Dutch artist, publisher and painter

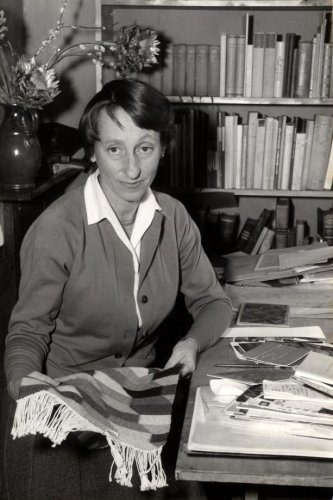
- Born: Gisèle van Waterschoot van der Gracht; 11 September 1912; The Hague, Netherlands
- Died: 28 May 2013 (aged 100); Amsterdam, Netherlands
- Other names: Gisèle, Gisèle d'Ailly
- Occupation: Artist

Gisèle d'Ailly van Waterschoot van der Gracht (11 September 1912 – 28 May 2013), also known by the mononym Gisèle, was a Dutch visual artist. During World War II, she operated a safe house out of her home for a group of young Jewish people in one of the apartments at the Herengracht 401, in the center of Amsterdam.

In 2019 a report was published by former judge Frans Bauduin about years of structural sexual abuse conducted by Wolfgang Frommel in the house of Gisele.

== Biography ==
=== Early life ===
Gisèle van Waterschoot van der Gracht was born in The Hague, Netherlands in 1912. She was the youngest of four children: Ides, Arthur and Walter. Her mother, Josephine von Hammer Purgstall, was an Austrian baroness. Her father, Willem van Waterschoot van der Gracht, was a geologist who worked for Royal Dutch Shell. Van Waterschoot spent the first three years of her life in the Netherlands, and then she and her family relocated to the United States due to her father’s work.

Throughout her childhood and young years, Gisèle and the rest of her family were rigorously exposed to Catholicism. Similarly to her mother, Gisèle attended the boarding school run by the sisters of The Sacred Heart when living in the U.S. In 1928, Gisèle and her parents travelled back to Europe and to Hainfeld’s castle in Austria, property of her mother’s family. Due to the move, Gisèle's formal education at the boarding school came to an end.

She returned to the Netherlands after the 1929 stock market crash.

=== Art education and early career ===
In 1930, she began to pursue a Fine Art education at Académie Julian, in Paris. At the Académie de la Grande Chaumière, Gisèle received lessons from Bernard Naudin. The study mainly involved working with models. At Edouard Henri Léon’s studio she learned various techniques of etching and engraving. Her examination piece, a large print after a self-portrait by Jean-Honoré Fragonard entitled L’Inspiration, gained her a Mention Honorable, Section Gravure at the 1931 Salon.

After a period of travelling between the Netherlands and the U.S., Gisèle established herself in first Limburg and later in Bergen, North Holland. In those years, she became acquainted with the renowned stained glass painter Joep Nicolas and his family, and studied the art of stained glass under Nicolas. She also completed a year of studies at the École des Beaux Arts in Paris.

Following 1934, Gisèle devoted herself to her artistic practice. In 1937, that she made her debut in the Netherlands at the exhibition “Hedendaagsche Limburgsche Kunst”, The Hague. She was represented with five paintings and a series of illustrations taken from her Paris sketchbook.

Her work was included in the 1939 exhibition and sale Onze Kunst van Heden (Our Art of Today) at the Rijksmuseum in Amsterdam. By 1939 she had her own studio and received her first independent commission for seven stained glass windows in the church of Oostrom, Limburg.

During the 1930s she befriended Dutch poet Adriaan Roland Holst. Through Holst, Gisèle made the acquaintance of German poet Wolfgang Frommel, who had emigrated from Germany. Although Frommel was not of Jewish origin, he left the country in response to the country's drastic turn in politics and ideology.

=== Activity during World War II ===
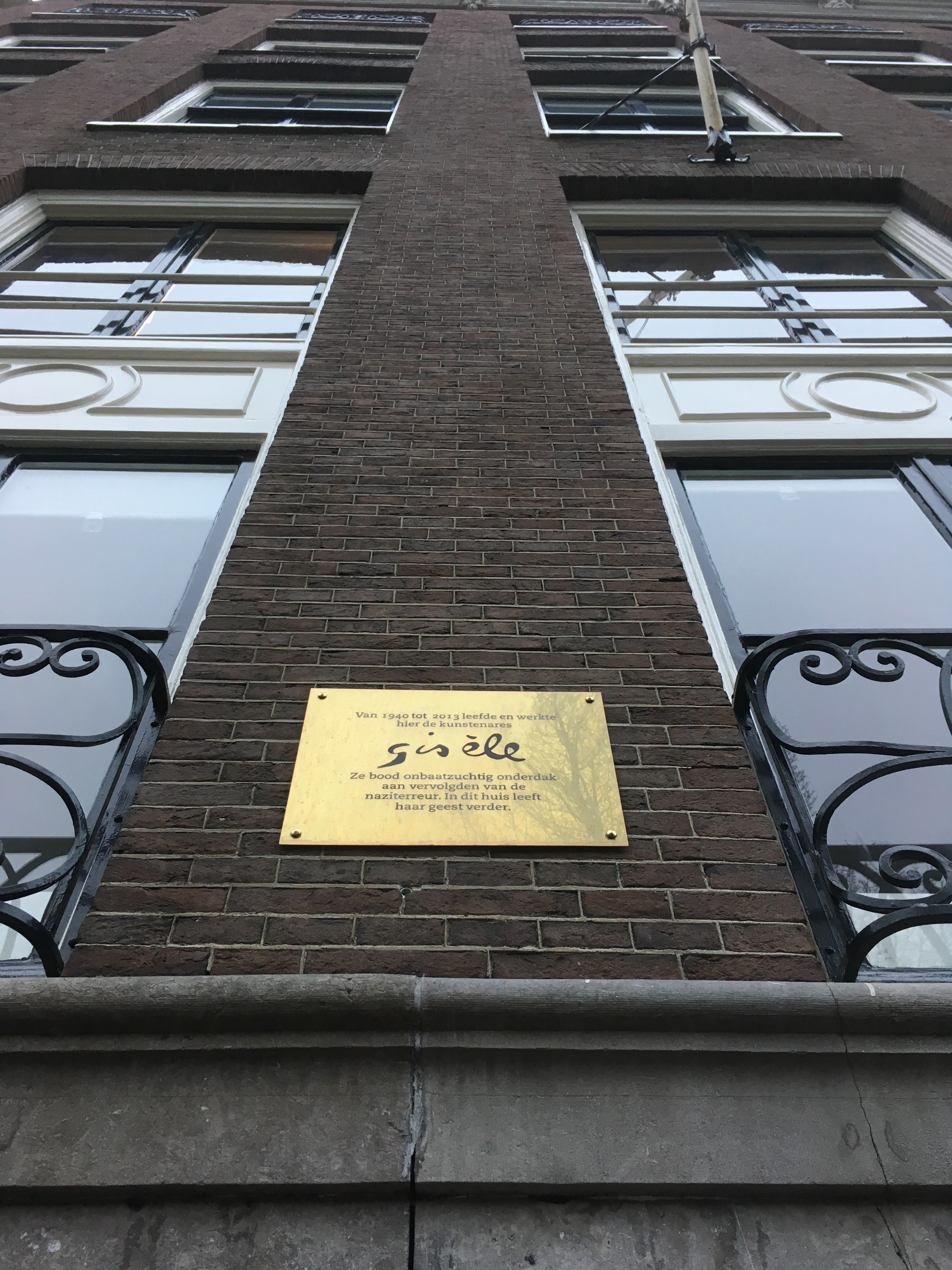
Commemorative plaque outside of the Stichting Herengracht 401 (H401)

In 1940, van Waterschoot rented a small apartment on the third floor of the building Herengracht 401 in central Amsterdam. Soon after, the Nazi occupation of the Netherlands began. For the duration of the war, van Waterschoot secretly housed several people in her apartment including Wolfgang Frommel (a German poet, who was a former member of the Sturmabteilung, the paramilitary wing of the German Nazi Party), Jewish teenager Claus Victor Bock, Jewish writer Friedrich W. Buri, and others. While in hiding, the group of artists and writers codenamed their shelter "Castrum Peregrini" and covertly studied art and literature. The members of the group survived the war.

Van Waterschoot supported herself and her lodgers during the war by selling commissioned paintings.

After the end of World War II, van Waterschoot bought the apartment building to convert to a single home where she lived and worked on and off for the rest of her life. She later donated the building to the Castrum Peregrini foundation, which operates as a cultural foundation under the name of Stichting Herengracht 401 (H401).

=== Later career ===
After World War II, she had the chance to reunite with her family. Her father had died in 1943, but her mother in the Netherlands and two brothers in the U.S.A. were still alive. In June 1945, she was reunited with Ides in Amsterdam, who had served as a highly ranked officer in the American army during the liberation of Europe. For a short period, she went back to America with her brothers, and while there she supported the fund for Dutch art in the aftermath of the war. In 1946, her work was featured in a group exhibition at Schaeffer Galleries in New York. She introduced three of her friends: Simon van Keulen, Peter Goldschmidt and Haro op ‘T Veldt. In the frame of this exhibition the fundraising campaign “Let Dutch Art Flower again” (New York, U.S.A.) started.

In 1946 she gave her first lecture her first lecture “Art Underground” which retraced the years of the occupation and Gisèle’s own story in Herengracht 401. The event marked a turning point in Gisèle’s career as new exhibitions and invitations followed this up.

She designed several stained glass windows including for the Begijnhof Chapel and the Krijtberg Church. van Waterschoot was friends with artist Max Beckmann and stored some of his paintings during his long period of exile from Germany. Following her mother's death in 1955, Gisèle was no longer tied to extreme financial needs, and was able to explore different art and painting expressions.

Starting in the 1960s until the 1980s, van Waterschoot spent several months each year painting and doing restoration work at an old monastery on the Greek island Paros.

=== Personal life and death ===
In 1959, van Waterschoot married Arnold Jan d'Ailly, who was mayor of Amsterdam from 1946 to 1956. van Waterschoot died in 2013 in Amsterdam.

== Recognitions and legacy ==
In honor of her actions during the war, van Waterschoot was named a Knight of the Order of Orange-Nassau. She received the Righteous Among the Nations recognition in 1997. Several institutions hold her artwork including the Castrum Peregrini foundation, Centraal Museum Utrecht, and Museum Van Loon. In 2018, a biography of van Waterschoot titled De eeuw van Gisèle (The Century of Gisèle) was published by Annet Mooij.
