= Letters from Baghdad =

- Film poster
- Directed by: Sabine Krayenbühl; Zeva Oelbaum
- Produced by: Zeva Oelbaum
- Starring: Tilda Swinton; Rose Leslie; Paul McGann; Helen Ryan; Christopher Villiers; Lucy Robinson; Rachael Stirling
- Cinematography: Gary Clarke; Petr Hlinomaz
- Edited by: Sabine Krayenbühl
- Music by: Paul Cantelon
- Distributed by: Vitagraph Films
- Release dates: October 6, 2016 (Beirut); June 2, 2017 (United States)
- Running time: 95 minutes
- Countries: United Kingdom; United States; France
- Languages: English; Arabic

Letters from Baghdad is a 2016 documentary film about the life and work of Gertrude Bell. It was executive produced by Tilda Swinton, who also provides voiceover work as Bell.

== Synopsis ==
The film chronicles the work of Gertrude Bell, an Englishwoman and archeologist, living in Arabia in the early 20th century. Her work helped to shape the Arab nation in the aftermath of World War I and the collapse of the Ottoman Empire, including the partition of the Ottoman Empire and establishment of the Kingdom of Iraq.

== Cast ==
=== Voice-overs ===
- Tilda Swinton as Gertrude Bell (older)
- Rose Leslie as Gertrude Bell (younger)
- Paul McGann as Henry Cadogan (son of Frederick William Cadogan)
- Pip Torrens as 'Dick' Doughty-Wylie
- Robert Ian Mackenzie as Winston Churchill
- Richard Poe as Standard Oil Man
- Nicholas Hunt as British ambassador to Turkey Louis du Pan Mallet
- Peter Day as Lord Cromer

=== Talking heads ===
- Eric Loscheider as T. E. Lawrence (Lawrence of Arabia)
- Helen Ryan as Lady Florence Bell
- Rachael Stirling as Vita Sackville-West
- Christopher Villiers as Sir Leonard Woolley
- Lucy Robinson as Lady Molly Trevelyan
- Elizabeth Rider as Lady Elsa Richmond
- Michael Higgs as Brigadier Sir Gilbert Clayton
- Joanna David as Janet E. Courtney
- Jürgen Kalwa as German ambassador Friedrich Rosen
- Tom Chadbon as Valentine Chirol
- Simon Chandler as David George Hogarth
- Andrew Havill as British High Commissioner in Baghdad Percy Cox
- Anthony Edridge as Arnold Wilson
- Michelle Eugene as Dorothy Van Ess (wife of John van Ess)
- Mark Meadows as military governor of Baghdad Frank Balfour

== Reception ==
Letters from Baghdad received mostly positive reviews from critics. On Metacritic the film has a score of 71% based on reviews from 12 critics.

Jay Weissberg of Variety both complimented the effort and questioned the historical omissions that might taint the portrait of their subject: "Getting Swinton on board doing double duty as voiceover actor and executive producer was a wise marketing decision, while the involvement of Thelma Schoonmaker and Kevin Brownlow assured appropriate attention would be given to the artistic and archival sides. The film also features staged talking heads speaking words sourced from letters and journals. Absent however is any hint of Edward Said's accusation of Orientalism that's intermittently colored modern assessments of Bell's crucial role in the foundation of modern Iraq; also missing are any negative assessments by her Arab contemporaries. Viewers attuned to chronology may object to the way footage from different eras is mixed together – the visuals accompanying a 1918 letter are certainly not from 1918 – yet that kind of criticism could be considered pedantic. The bottom line is that Oelbaum and Krayenbühl have fleshed out a complex, fascinating figure, and after a successful festival career, it's good to see 'Letters' getting its due via limited release."
