= Essen (disambiguation) =

Essen is a city in the Ruhr area of Germany.

Essen, von Essen, van Essen, may also refer to:

- Spiel or Essen, a game fair held in Essen, Germany

== People ==
- Essen (surname)
- Van Essen (surname), a Dutch surname, sometimes reduced to "Essen"
- Von Essen (surname), a German surname, sometimes reduced to "Essen"
- Essen family, a Baltic-German noble family

== Places ==
- 133243 Essen, the asteroid Essen, a main-belt asteroid, the 133243rd asteroid registered
- Essen, Belgium, a municipality in Antwerp, Belgium
- Diocese of Essen, Essen, Germany; a Roman-Catholic diocese
- Essen Formation, a geologic formation in Germany
- Essen (Oldenburg), a municipality in Cloppenburg, Lower Saxony, Germany
- Essen, Groningen, a hamlet in the Netherlands
- Essen, Gelderland, a village in Gelderland, the Netherlands
- Von Essen Mountain, Gjelsvik Mountains, Queen Maud Land, Antarctica; a mountain
- Mount Van der Essen, Belgica Mountains, Queen Maud Land, Antarctica; a mountain

=== Facilities and structures ===
- Essen railway station, Belgium; in Essen, Belgium
- Essen Cathedral, Essen, Germany; a Roman-Catholic cathedral
- Essen Abbey, Essen, Germany; a lay abbey for canonesses
- Stadion Essen (Essen Stadium), Essen, Germany
- Essen/Mülheim Airport, Essen, Germany
- City port of Essen, Essen, Germany; a riverport on the Rhine–Herne Canal

== Vehicular ==
- FV Essen, a West German fishing trawler in service 1945-56
- Russian frigate Admiral Essen, a Russian Admiral Grigorovich class missile frigate

== Other uses ==
- Essen (album), a 1969 live-performance album by Pink Floyd
- Von Essen Hotels, a hotel chain

== See also ==
- Essen III, a German electoral district
- Essen II, a German electoral district
- Bad Essen, in the district of Osnabrück, Lower Saxony
- Esen (disambiguation)
- Assen, a city in the Netherlands
