= Karin Smirnov =

Finnish-Swedish writer (1880–1973)

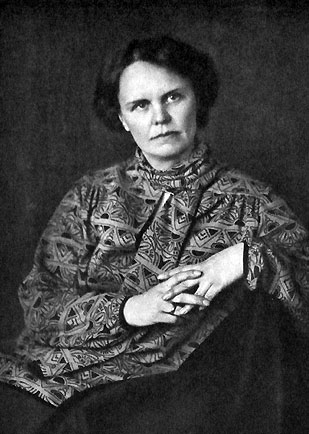
Smirnov in 1927

Karin Smirnov or Smirnoff (née Strindberg; 26 February 1880 – 10 May 1973) was a Finland-Swedish writer. She was the daughter of August Strindberg and Siri von Essen.

Smirnov was a socialist; she married Russian Bolshevik Vladimir Smirnov. She wrote plays and also books about her mother and father, and their marriage. She lived in Finland from 1893 to 1918 and in Sweden from 1918 onwards.

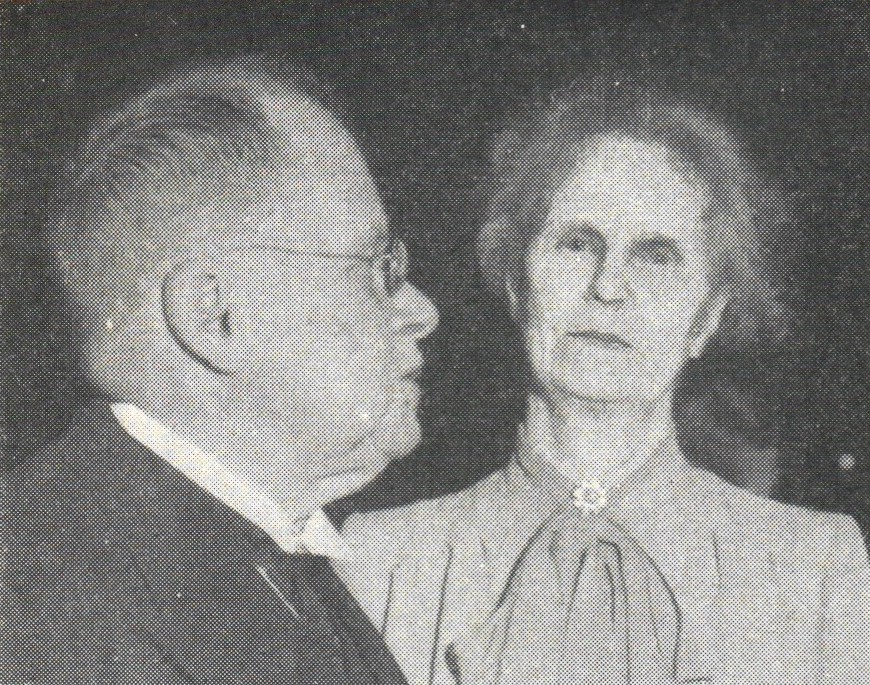
Karin and Vladimir Smirnov at the City of Stockholm's celebration in the City Hall to commemorate August Strindberg's 100th birth anniversary, 1949.

== Works ==
- Under ansvar (1915)
- Vårbrytning (1915)
- Makter (1922)
- Ödesmärkt (1923)
- Riddaren och jungfrun (1924)
- Strindbergs första hustru [Siri von Essen] (1925)
- En tvetydig historia (1927)
- Första akten (1930)
- Bröderna i Vidala kloster (1940)
- Systrarna i Nådendals kloster. 1 (by Hannes Bernson, 1948)
- Systrarna i Nådendals kloster. 2 (by Hannes Bernson, 1949)
- Så var det i verkligheten (1956)
