= C.C. van Essen =

Carel Claudius van Essen
- Born: July 26, 1899; Amsterdam
- Died: May 30, 1963 (aged 63); Rome
- Education: Rijksuniversiteit Utrecht
- Spouse: Madsy Maria van Dam (1901–?)
- Scientific career
- Workplaces: Archeologisch Museum Scheurleer, gymnasium Zwolle, Rijksuniversiteit Groningen, Rijksuniversiteit Utrecht, Royal Netherlands Institute in Rome
- Thesis: Did Orphic Influence on Etruscan Tomb Paintings Exist? Studies in Etruscan Tomb Paintings I (1927)
- Doctoral advisor: Hendrik Bolkestein

Carel Claudius van Essen (Amsterdam, 26 July 1899 – Rome, 31 May 1963) was a Dutch classical archaeologist and art historian.

== Life and career ==
Van Essen studied Classical archaeology at Utrecht University. His interest in classical archaeology was stimulated by C.W. Lunsingh Scheurleer, a Dutch archaeologist and collector of antiquities, whose collections were displayed in the Museum Scheurleer in The Hague. Van Essen worked for the museum and published his first short articles in the Bulletin voor Antieke Beschaving, edited by Scheurleer. He also lectured at the Royal Academy of Art, The Hague.

During his student years, Van Essen travelled extensively in Greece and Italy. He spent the winter of 1924–25 in Rome working on his doctoral dissertation. There he met Eugénie Sellers Strong, who influenced his later archaeological thinking. Other influential figures he encountered during these stays included the Etruscologist Antonio Minto and Minto's student Ranuccio Bianchi Bandinelli. In December 1926, Van Essen received a grant from the Philological Study Fund and again travelled to Greece and Italy, visiting especially Apulia, Campania and Etruria. His interests focused primarily on art-historical questions and Etruscan art. In 1927 he received his doctorate from Utrecht University under H. Bolkestein with a dissertation on Etruscan tomb paintings. In 1928 he published two important articles: the first on the monument of Lucius Aemilius Paullus Macedonicus at Delphi, arguing that it was a Roman work of art; the second on an Etruscan tomb at Tarquinia, continuing the research begun in his dissertation.

When Museum Scheurleer was dissolved in 1932 because of the economic depression, Van Essen took up a position in secondary education, first in Kampen and later in Zwolle, where he became headmaster of the municipal gymnasium. In 1940 he was appointed private lecturer at the University of Groningen and delivered his inaugural lecture on "Sulla as Builder".

During the German occupation of the Netherlands during World War II, Van Essen was active in the resistance. He meanwhile published an article in 1943 on Italic and Roman art up to the age of Constantine the Great in K.G. Boon & F. van Thienen's second volume of Algemeene kunstgeschiedenis ("General art history"). The article had originally been written by H.M.R. Leopold (1877–1950), deputy director of the Royal Netherlands Institute in Rome, but was completely revised and rewritten by Van Essen.

When Leopold resigned in 1942, it was expected that Van Essen would succeed him. He was formally appointed on 7 October 1946 and took office on 1 June 1947. His duties included reorganising the institute's staff and consolidating its position within the international archaeological community. A year later he joined the board of the Associazione Internazionale di Archeologia Classica (AIAC) and became editor of Fasti Archaeologici. Annual Bulletin of Classical Archaeology, the association's official journal. Van Essen played a prominent role in the editing of Fasti, particularly in the selection and organisation of material for publication. He also improved working conditions at the institute by making his own extensive library available. His guided tours and excursions, regularly organised in Rome and its surroundings for students and the public, were also highly valued.

As deputy director, Van Essen regularly published extensive survey articles on the progress of archaeological research in Italy. In addition to numerous articles, he wrote detailed book reviews. In 1951 he was elected a corresponding member of the Royal Netherlands Academy of Arts and Sciences. In 1954 he published De Kunst van het Oude Rome ("The Art of Ancient Rome"), which was translated into French in 1960 by Jean Bayet, director of the École française de Rome, under the title Précis de l'art Antique en Italie. The two had known each other since their student days at the École française d'Athènes during the 1920s.

Van Essen's practical archaeological work in Rome was of major importance, particularly the excavation of the Mithraeum beneath the church of Santa Prisca on the Aventine Hill, whose existence had been known since the 1930s. He directed the excavation from 1952 to 1958 in collaboration with M.J. Vermaseren, and the results were published in a major volume in 1965. Van Essen died unexpectedly in 1963 and was buried in the Protestant Cemetery, Rome.

== Personal life ==
Van Essen was married to Madsy Maria van Dam (1901–?). At least one child is known from the marriage, a son, Wouter Frederik van Essen, born in The Hague on 7 July 1926.

== Selected publications ==
— (1927). Did Orphic Influence on Etruscan Tomb Paintings Exist? Studies in Etruscan Tomb Paintings I. Amsterdam: H.J. Paris.
— (1928a). "Notes sur quelques sculptures de Delphes". Bulletin de Correspondance Hellénique (in French). 52: 231–244.
— (1928b). "La Tomba del Cardinale". Studi Etruschi (in Italian). 2: 83–124, tav. 18–26.
— (1954a). La topographie de la Domus Aurea Neronis. Mededelingen van de Koninklijke Nederlandse Akademie van Wetenschappen. Afd. Letterkunde. Nieuwe Reeks. Vol. 17. Amsterdam: Noord-Hollandsche Uitg. Maatschappij.
— (1954b). De kunst van het oude Rome. Den Haag: Servire.
—; Vermaseren, M.J. (1965). The Excavations in the Mithraeum of the Church of Santa Prisca in Rome. Leiden: Brill.

== Sources ==
- Byvanck, A.W. (1963–1964). "Herdenking van Carel Claudius van Essen (26 juli 1899 - 31 mei 1963)" (PDF). Jaarboek van de Koninklijke Nederlandse Akademie van Wetenschappen (in Dutch): 453–460.
- van Dam van Isselt, Henriëtte (1965). "Ter nagedachtenis aan Carel van Essen". Mededelingen van het Nederlands Historisch Instituut te Rome (in Dutch). 32: 1–6.
- Vermaseren, M.J. (1963). "Ter nagedachtenis aan Dr. Carel Claudius van Essen, 1899–1963". Bibliotheca Orientalis (in Dutch). 20: 219–220.
- Weststeijn, Arthur; de Gelder, Laurien (2020). "Digging dilettanti: the first Dutch excavation in Italy, 1952–58". In Roberts, Julia; Sheppard, Kathleen; Hansson, Ulf R.; Trigg, Jonathan R. (eds.). Communities and knowledge production in archaeology. Manchester: Manchester University Press. pp. 66–87. doi:10.7765/9781526134561.00011. ISBN 978-1-5261-3455-4.
