= Cold Feet series 6 =

Cold Feet
- Series 6
- No. of episodes: 8

Release
- Original network: ITV1
- Original release: 5 September – 24 October 2016

Series chronology
- ← Previous; Series 5 Next → Series 7

The sixth series of the British comedy-drama television series Cold Feet was broadcast on the ITV network from 5 September to 24 October 2016. There are eight episodes and it is the first full series of Cold Feet since 2003.

== Cast ==
=== Main ===
- James Nesbitt as Adam Williams
- Robert Bathurst as David Marsden
- Hermione Norris as Karen Marsden
- John Thomson as Pete Gifford
- Fay Ripley as Jenny Gifford
- Leanne Best as Tina Reynolds
- Ceallach Spellman as Matt Williams

=== Recurring ===
- Karen David as Angela Zubayr
- Art Malik as Eddie Zubayr
- Daisy Edgar-Jones as Olivia Marsden
- Ella Hunt as Ellie Marsden
- Jack Harper as Adam Gifford
- Madeleine Edmondson as Chloe Gifford
- Lucy Robinson as Robyn Duff
- Robert Webb as Grant Hodges

=== Guest ===
- Jacey Sallés as Ramona Ramirez

== Episodes ==
No.	Title	Directed by	Written by	Original release date	Viewers (millions)
33	Episode 1	Terry McDonough	Mike Bullen	5 September 2016	9.13
Adam returns from Singapore with the news he is to marry again, to Angela, the daughter of a millionaire business tycoon. Matthew shows opposition to the marriage, but is later revealed as a response to his forthcoming expulsion from school after being found in possession of drugs. Adam's friends believe that his decision to marry Angela so quickly after meeting is in a desperate attempt to hold onto happiness after Rachel, and a close encounter from the grave makes him contemplative. David speaks candidly to Robyn about the lack of romance between them, compelling him to turn to Karen as a last resort. Pete and Jenny's marriage buckles under the strain of their financial problems, with Pete seemingly in the throes of a mid-life crisis, combined with a monotonous job as a taxi driver and his frustrating work as a carer for pensioner Harry (James Bolam). Karen intervenes with Adam and Matthew's relationship, coming at an inconvenient time for Adam, who brings the wedding forward.
34	Episode 2	Terry McDonough	Mike Bullen	12 September 2016	7.74
Adam has second thoughts following Karen's pre-ceremony words about Matthew. David is eager to sign Angela's father Eddie (Art Malik) as a client to his firm, and coerces Karen to join him at a business event; Robyn's discovery of this creates an even larger rift between her and David. David organises a corporate box at a Manchester United match at Old Trafford for Eddie, and invites Harry, Adam, Pete and their sons, but leaves them with void tickets. Adam's attempt to bond with Matthew over football fails after ignoring how his son's interests have changed over his lengthy absence. His curiosity over Matthew's sexuality is later quelled when Karen reveals she walked in on him with her daughter Ellie. Adam is disconcerted at Pete's uncharacteristic behaviour. Jenny battles her faltering relationship with Pete, with her attempts to reignite their love life proving fruitless. Her intrigue for a mysterious client evaporates after she realises that Pete is suffering from depression.
35	Episode 3	Juliet May	Mike Bullen	19 September 2016	7.77
Everyone rallies around Pete following his depression diagnosis. David, whose suspension from work following a wrongful arrest for fraud leaves him with nothing to do, encourages Pete and Adam to go cycling in an attempt to lift Pete's spirits. Jenny is perturbed by her admirer's unremitting attempts to contact her, and enlists Adam's help to rid herself of him, questioning her fracturing relationship with Pete in the process. Karen's relationship with Eddie flourishes, yet she remains hesitant despite encouragement from Ellie. Angela struggles to act as a mother to Matthew, and finds it difficult to part herself from her life in Singapore much longer, where the promise of a promotion is too tantalising to give up.
36	Episode 4	Juliet May	Mike Bullen	26 September 2016	7.34
News of Harry's passing pushes Pete into a dejective state. Jenny's sister is determined to make things difficult for her in regards to caring for their supposedly indisposed mother. David finds himself even more isolated when a ruthless Robyn decides she wants a divorce. His fraud accusation and separation from Robyn lead him to call on the pity of Karen and his daughters, but finds out he doesn't like playing second fiddle to Karen and Eddie. Adam and Angela's temporary solution for a long-distance relationship begins to show cracks, and after incorrectly assuming she has cheated, Adam turns to Tina, who lives across from him. After she rejects him, Angela returns in a last attempt to reconcile and convince Adam to join her in Singapore. Adam has a realisation about his relationship with Matthew.
37	Episode 5	Jamie Jay Johnson	Amy Roberts & Loren McLaughlan	3 October 2016	7.28
The alleged nature of the claims David misappropriated client funds becomes an indictment, and soon meddles in Karen's finances. Karen becomes dissatisfied with her job and considers a redundancy offer, and starts considering self-publishing, something Eddie throws cold water on. Both Pete and Tina take note of Adam's wallowing, and suggest he spends time with Matthew, but his attempts to bond over music end with a riposte from Matthew. Jenny is paid an unwelcome visit by former partner Grant (Robert Webb), whom it transpires is Chloe's biological father. Jen and Pete disagree on whether to tell Chloe, while they contemplate over the news Harry's children are contesting his will, which left Pete with a large sum. Grant reveals the truth to Chloe against Pete and Jenny's will.
38	Episode 6	Jamie Jay Johnson	Mike Bullen & John Forte	10 October 2016	7.17
Chloe refuses to recognise Pete as her father. Coupled with Jenny's insistence that he fight for the money Harry left him in his will, Pete struggles to cope. Grant changes his mind about wanting a relationship with Chloe and leaves Manchester. David acclimatises to prison life, forming a profound connection with a cellmate. Tina helps Adam and Matthew's search for a permanent home. Karen's decision to become freelance reaps rewards, which include being wooed by an enthusiastic potential investor and main shareholder in her company. Her increasing distance from Eddie forces her into a relationship decision. As all converge on the local pub to encourage young Adam's band's performance, Pete's position as a role model is reignited and Tina's growing fondness for Adam is acted upon.
39	Episode 7	Terry McDonough	Loren McLoughan, Amy Roberts and Mike Bullen	17 October 2016	7.40
Adam dwells on Tina's kiss, and is approached by a woman who claims her husband, unbeknown to her Tina's lover, Jamie, is cheating on her. Tina is forced to choose between Jamie and bemused Adam. David, who is struggling in the midst of worrying about the cost of his legal matters and Robyn's divorce terms, empties his daughters' university fund to help pay for his defence. As a result of this, he ends up on Pete and Jenny's doorstep. He forms a plan to blackmail his boss into providing help in the case for his innocence. Pete and Tricia come to an amicable agreement regarding the money bequeathed by Harry. Pete wants to use the money primarily for mortgage repayments, but Jenny feels the family needs a holiday. Meanwhile, Karen and Jenny's attempts at collaborating on the former's new business marketing end in a joint agreement never to enter into any work relationship together. Tina's lover turns up on her doorstep and serenades her. Tina and Adam's relationship comes to a head.
40	Episode 8	Terry McDonough	Mike Bullen	24 October 2016	7.42
Pete lets slip about Adam’s surprise party, which marks his 49th birthday. The celebrations put up by Tina incorrectly have his age a year older. Adam retains his fixation on Tina, and dejectedly decides to go to an off-license with Pete, but the two are caught up in an attempted robbery. During the hold-up, Pete opens up to Adam, and reveals to his intention to kill himself. Adam does his best to reason with the robber before they both manage to leave the off-licence unscathed. Back at the party, Jenny and Karen are thrilled when they receive news from David that the charges against him are being dropped. David hits the booze in celebration, and he reveals to Karen his desire to get back together with her. He clashes with Eddie, who also hopes to resume his relationship with Karen. Karen and David’s son, Josh, arrives unexpectedly at Adam’s party, alongside Ramona, with a new boyfriend, Juan, whom Karen, Jenny and Adam hypothesise is gay. Karen stumbles upon Juan with Josh in the bathroom, before Karen frankly admits to Josh she’s been aware of his sexuality for years. Josh proclaims his wish for her to make David aware, but is cautious of his reaction. Matthew reveals Ellie’s wish to return to a relationship with him despite his desire to begin a relationship with her sister, Olivia. Adam and Tina’s relationship becomes the ultimate focus of the party and such attention encourages the two to start a relationship.
