= Lucy Robinson (actress) =

British actress

- Born: Lucy Jane Robinson; 1966 (age 59–60); London, England
- Occupation: Actress
- Years active: 1989–present
- Spouse: Nicholas Murchie (m. 1999)
- Parent: Robert Robinson

Lucy Jane Robinson (born 1966) is a British actress working mostly in television.

Her television roles include Louisa Hurst in Pride and Prejudice (1995), Robyn Duff in the fifth, sixth, seventh, eighth and ninth series of Cold Feet, Mayoress Christabel Wickham in the second series of The Thin Blue Line and Pam Draper in Suburban Shootout. She has also played Frau Clovis, secretary to the Duke of Manhattan, in the Doctor Who episode "New Earth" and Mrs. Elton in the 1996 TV adaptation of Emma. She also appeared in a single episode of The IT Crowd as a prospective employer to Jen. She had a role as Harriet Burgess in EastEnders, and appeared in a single episode of BBC TV children's series Powers. In 2006 she played the part of Louise Mallory in 'Expiation', the final episode of the first series of Lewis. She has also appeared in ITV drama William and Mary as Mrs Rick, alongside Martin Clunes and Julie Graham. She has more recently worked alongside Clunes in Doc Martin, in which she played cellist Holly.

On the big screen she played Janey in Bridget Jones: The Edge of Reason, and Judith in The Best Exotic Marigold Hotel. On stage, in 2014, she played the part of 'Liz', (the younger of two versions of Queen Elizabeth II) in the Moira Buffini play Handbagged. Robinson's roles as a voice actor include Lydia Gwilt in Wilkie Collins' Armadale.

Her father was the journalist and presenter Robert Robinson. She is married to the actor Nicholas Murchie.

== Filmography ==
Year	Title	Role	Notes
1991	Clarissa	Deb	3 episodes
1994	Heartbeat	Jennifer Radcliffe	3 episodes
1994–1995	Revelations	Rachel Rattigan	24 episodes
1995	All Quiet on the Preston Front	Kim	Episode: "Polson's Lilo"
1995	Pride and Prejudice	Mrs Hurst	6 episodes
1996	Emma	Mrs Elton	Television film
1996	The Thin Blue Line	Dame Cristabelle Wickham	3 episodes
1996, 2002	Casualty	Paula Rogers / Margaret Laker	2 episodes
1997	Frighteners	Mother	Episode: "If You Meet a Fairy..."
1997	Harry Enfield and Chums	Unknown	Episode: "Harry Enfield and Christmas Chums"
1998	Dressing for Breakfast	Sarah	3 episodes
1998	Get Real	Suzy	Episode: "Patches"
1998	A Rather English Marriage	Susan	Television film
1998–2002	The Bill	Joely Fleming / Sgt. Jane Snowden / Carol Bryant	3 episodes
1999	Nancherrow	Laura Cox	2 episodes
1999	Big Bad World	Sophie Fraser	Episode: "Be Nice to Posh People"
2000	Beast	Judy	Episode: "Talking Dirty"
2001	People Like Us	Unknown	Episode: "The Mother"
2001	Peak Practice	Abbey Preston	Episode: "Bad Tony"
2002	Animated Tales of the World	Maid (voice)	Episode: "Shepherdess and the Chimney Sweep"
2002	Rescue Me	Sara	Episode: "Episode #1.1"
2002	Barbara	Vickie	Episode: "Weekend"
2002	The Biographer	Julie Pretty	Television film
2002	Wire in the Blood	Jilly Davies	Episode: "Shadows Rising: Part 2"
2002	Celeb	Interviewer	Episode: "The Love Child"
2003	Down to Earth	Mrs. Webster	Episode: "Moving On"
2003	Carla	Pathologist	Television film
2003	A Touch of Frost	Antonia Knight	Episode: "Another Life"
2003–2020	Cold Feet	Robyn Duff	17 episodes
2004	Powers	Cora Hamilton	Episode: "Things That Go Bump"
2004	William and Mary	Helen Fisk	Episode: "Episode #2.4"
2004	Family Affairs	DI Kathryn Warren-Hall	3 episodes
2004	Bridget Jones: The Edge of Reason	Janey	
2004	Rosemary and Thyme	Norah Westward	Episode: "Up the Garden Path"
2004–2019	Doctors	Various	6 episodes
2005	Bernard's Watch	Veronica Green	Episode: "Learn to Earn"
2005–2014	Holby City	Sally Downing / Jill Livingston / Lowri Delaney	4 episodes
2006	Doctor Who	Frau Clovis	Episode: "New Earth"
2006	Brief Encounters	Fiona Deary	Episode: "Ted"
2006	Donovan	Olivia Baldwin	Episode: "Episode #2.3"
2006–2007	Suburban Shootout	Pam Draper	11 episodes
2007	Lewis	Louise Hayward	Episode: "Expiation"
2007	The Royal	Lady Isabella Martindale	2 episodes
2007	HolbyBlue	Karen Hooper	Episode: "Episode #1.5"
2007	Sex, the City and Me	Janet Reynolds	Television film
2007	Doc Martin	Holly	Episode: "The Holly Bears a Prickle"
2008	Eastenders	Harriet	4 episodes
2008	The IT Crowd	June	Episode: "Tramps Like Us"
2009	Missing	Sarah Banberry	Episode: "Episode #1.3"
2009	U Be Dead	Kay Scudder	Television film
2010	New Tricks	Kate Smythe	Episode: "Coming Out Ball"
2011	The Best Exotic Marigold Hotel	Judith	
2012	Being Human	Dr. Wilson	Episode: "A Spectre Calls"
2013	Call the Midwife	Matron	Episode: "Episode #2.3"
2013	Coronation Street	Prosecution Barrister	5 episodes
2015	National Theatre Live: The Hard Problem	Ursula	
2016	The Hollow Crown	Young Cecily	2 episodes
2016	Letters from Baghdad	Lady Molly Trevelyan	
2017	PrankMe	Mrs. Perkins	TV series
2019	London Kills	Supt. Gina Vincent	Episode: "Connected"
2022	Charity	Rebecca	Short film
2022	Ridley	Lisa Varnham	Episode: "Swansong"
