= Marjan Schwegman =

Dutch historian (born 1951)

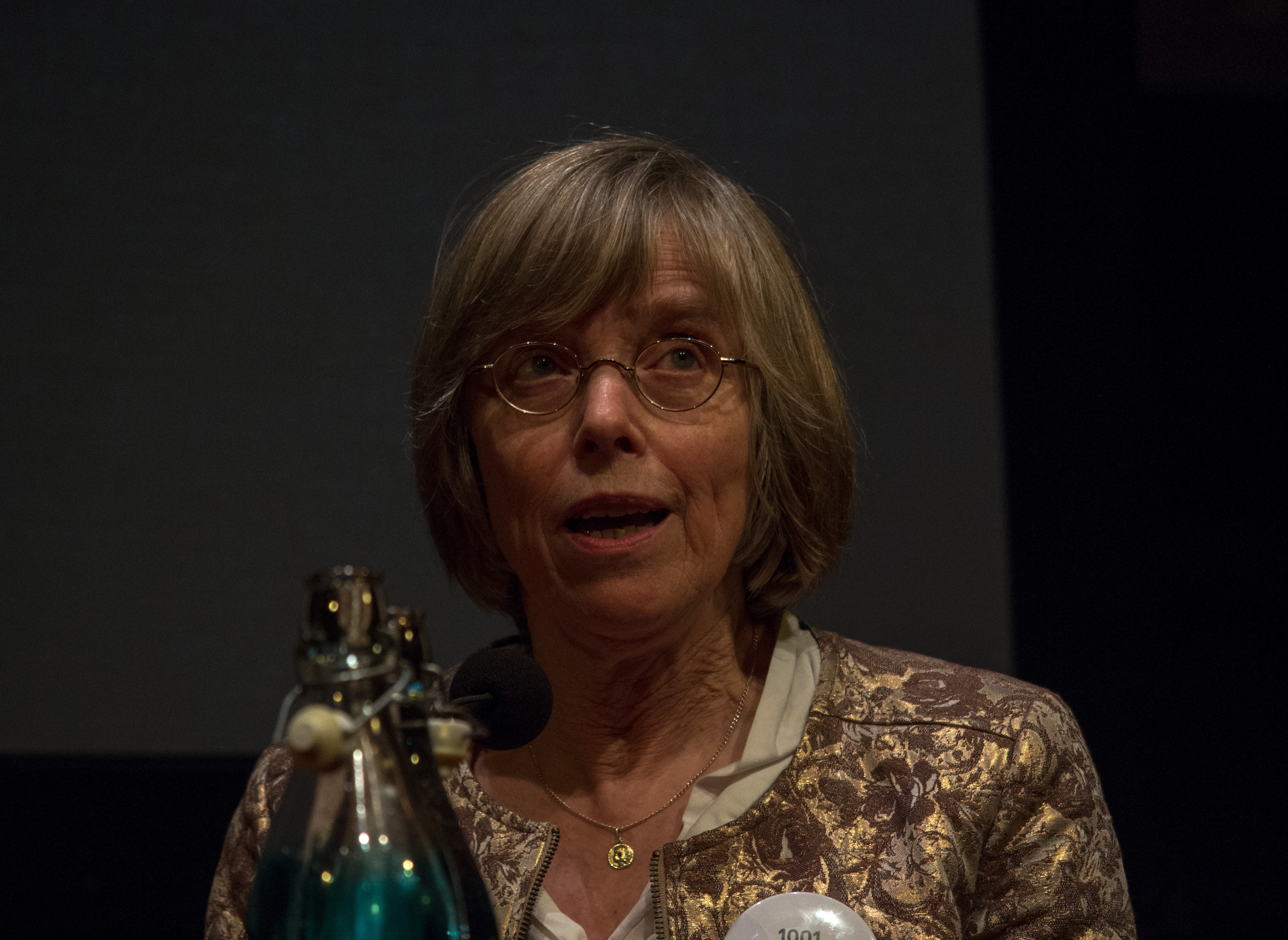
- Schwegman in 2015
- Born: 20 February 1951 (age 75); Middenmeer
- Education: University of Amsterdam
- Occupation: Historian
- Known for: Order of Orange-Nassau

Maria Janna "Marjan" Schwegman (born 20 February 1951, Middenmeer) is a Dutch historian who was managing director of the NIOD Institute for War, Holocaust and Genocide Studies from March 2007 to 18 February 2016. Besides that, she is a professor in Politics and Culture in the 20th century at the faculty of Humanities at Utrecht University.

== Life and work ==
Marjan Schwegman studied history at the University of Amsterdam.

From 2003 to 2007 Marjan Schwegman was managing director of the Royal Netherlands Institute in Rome. Previously she worked at the University of Amsterdam, Leiden University, Maastricht University and Utrecht University. In Utrecht she became bijzonder hoogleraar (endowed professor) women's history.

From 2007, she occupied the chair of Politics and Culture in the Long Twentieth Century. Since 2003, her main work is no longer at the university: from 2003 to 2007 she was director of the Royal Netherlands Institute in Rome. She has been director of NIOD since 2007.

From 2009–2010, she was vice-chairman of the Commissie-Davids (an independent commission supervised by jurist Willibrord Davids, the 'Davids Committee') which looked into the decision-making process for the Dutch support in the Iraq War.

On 18 February 2016, Jet Bussemaker decorated Schwegman with the title officier in de Orde van Oranje-Nassau (Officer in the Order of Orange-Nassau).

She wrote a biography of the Italian educator Maria Montessori (2000) as well as a biography of the 19th-century Italian feminist Gualberta Beccari, and biographical articles on Giuseppe Mazzini and Cesare Lombroso.
