= Peter Essen =

Baltic German military personnel

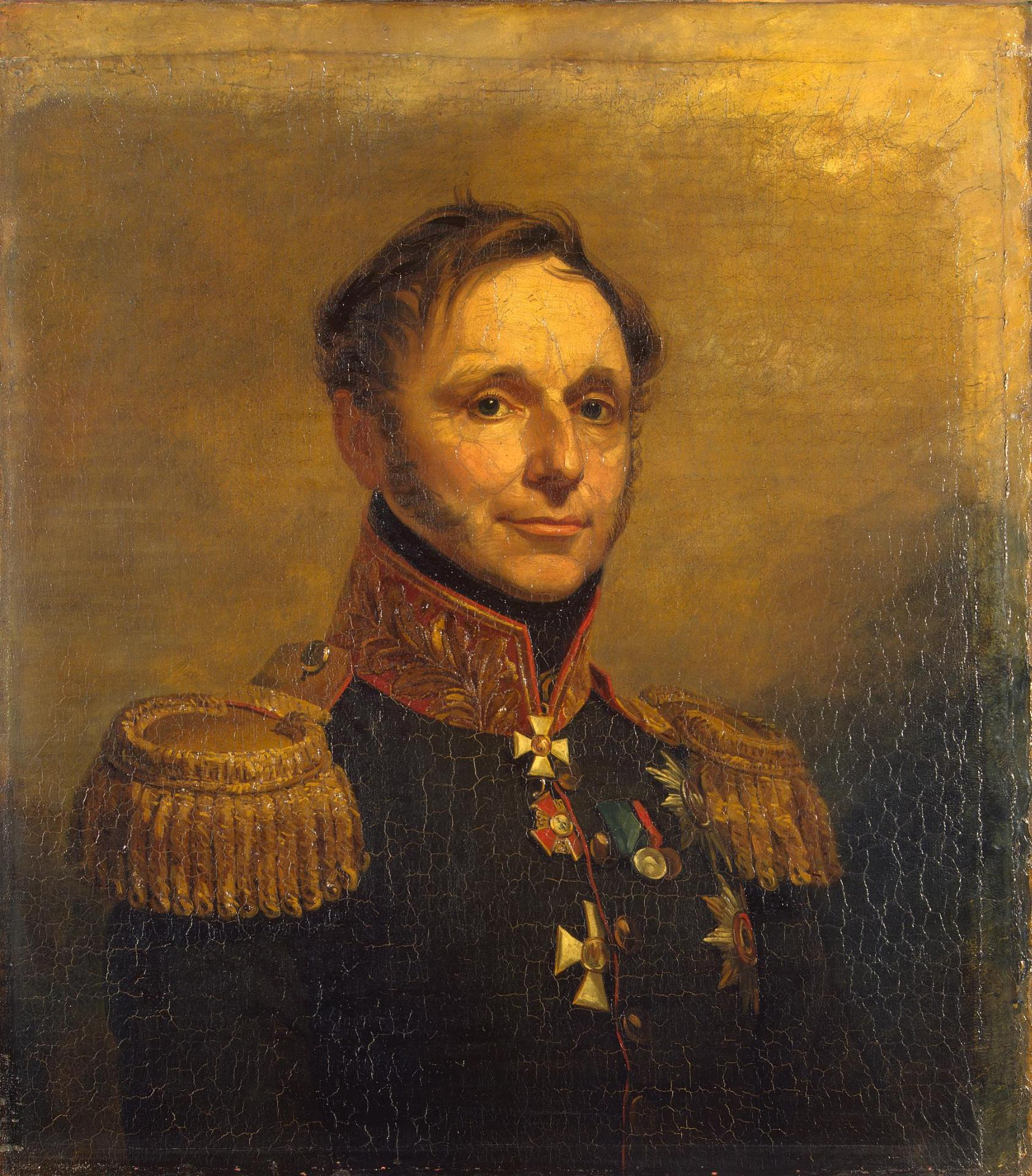
Portrait by George Dawe from the Military Gallery of the Winter Palace

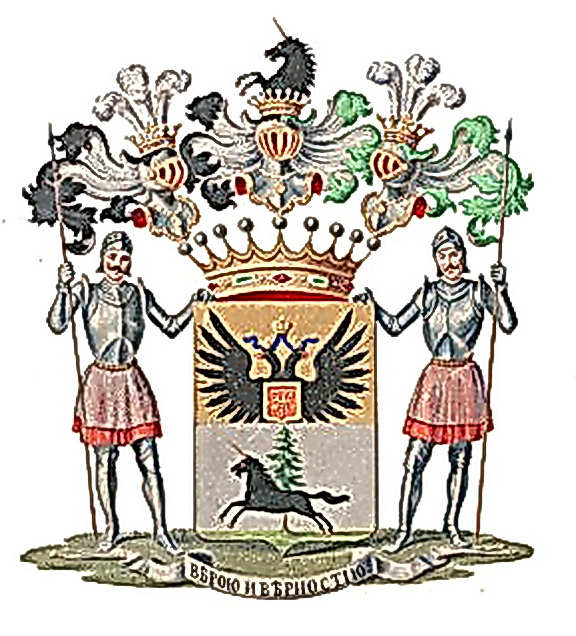

Count Peter Essen (Russian: Пётр Кири́ллович Э́ссен, tr. Pyotr Kirillovich Essen; 11 August 1772 – 23 September 1844) was a Baltic German General of the Infantry in 1819 and a count (1833). He belongs to the bourgeois Essen family from Pärnu (not to be confused with the Baltic German noble Essen family, which had the von prefix in the name). Essen's only daughter, Alexandrine Essen (1816–1868), married count Pontus von Stenbock-Fermor (1806–1866) in 1835, at which point they began using the joint name Essen-Stenbock-Fermor.

== Career ==
Essen enlisted as a sergeant in the Life Cuirassier Regiment in 1787, and transferred to the Pavlovsky heir battalion in 1790. He received promotions through the ranks, and in 1796 was promoted to lieutenant and transferred to the Life Guards Izmailovskiy Regiment. In 1796 he was promoted to colonel and in 1798 was promoted to major-general, and became head of the Vyborg musketeer regiment. He was promoted to lieutenant general in 1800.

In August 1800, Essen was appointed military governor of Vyborg, and chief of the garrison of the Gorchakov [Vyborg] regiment. In 1802 he was appointed head of the Vyborg and Shlisselbourg musketeer regiments. In 1807 he was awarded the Order of St. George, third class, for his actions in the Battle of Eylau.

Essen headed the 8th, 27th, and 4th Infantry Divisions of the army during 1816 and 1817, and was appointed military governor of Orenburg in 1817, and was appointed manager of the civil part of the province. In 1819, he was made a general of infantry. From 1830 to 1842 he served as military governor-general of St. Petersburg and a member of the State Council. In 1834 he was awarded the Order of St. Andrew for his service.

== Awards ==
- Russia's Order of St. Andrew (22 April 1834), diamonds (16 April 1841); St. Vladimir 1st century bol. kr. (12 February 1812), 2nd century (18 February 1808); St. Alexander Nevsky (19 December 1809), diamonds (23 August 1811), White Eagle (22 April 1834); St. George 3rd Class (8 April 1807); Sant'Anna 1st century diamonds (3 October 1799), 2nd century (15 May 1798), 3rd st. (28 January 1798); St. John of Jerusalem.
- Foreign orders: Prussian Order of the Black Eagle (29 June 1842) and the Red Eagle 1st century (1807).
- Other: gold sword "for bravery" with diamonds (18 October 1809), silver medal in memory of the Patriotic War of 1812 (1814), a bronze medal in memory of the Patriotic War of 1812 (1814), Medal of Honor "for XLV years of faultless service" (22 August 1837; XL years – 22 August 1831; XXXV years – 22 August 1830).
