= Esens =

Esens may signify:

Places

- Esens, Lower Saxony, a municipality in Lower Saxony, Germany
- Esens (Samtgemeinde), a "collective municipality" in Lower Saxony, Germany

People

- Hero Oomkens von Esens, a Frisian nobleman (c. 1455 – 1522)
- Balthasar Oomkens von Esens, was a Frisian nobleman (died 1540)
- Chief Esens or Thomas Little Shell, an Ojibwa chief (-1901)
- Tevfik Esenç, the last known speaker of the Ubykh language (1904–1992)

== See also ==
- Esen (disambiguation)
