= Esen =

Esen may refer to:

== Given name ==
- Esen Buqa I (1310 - c. 1318), Khan of the Chagatai Khanate
- Esen Buqa II (1429–1462), Khan of Moghulistan
- Esen Taishi, 15th-century Oirat leader of Northern Yuan dynasty

== Surname ==
- Aydin Esen (born 1962), Turkish composer
- Barış Esen (born 1986), Turkish chess grandmaster
- Evin Esen (1949–2012), Turkish actress
- Itır Esen (born 1957), Turkish actress
- Emine Ecem Esen (born 1994), Turkish footballer
- Nilay Esen Ersun (born 1987), Turkish marathon runner
- Timuçin Esen (born 1973), Turkish actor

== Places ==
- Esen, Belgium, a village in Belgium
- Esen, Bulgaria, a village in Bulgaria
- Esen, Haymana, a village in Turkey
- Esen, Vezirköprü, a village in Turkey
- Eşen, Manyas, a village in Turkey

== Others ==
- ESEN, Escuela Superior de Economía y Negocios en El Salvador, Central America
- Esen Air, an airline based in Bishkek, Kyrgyzstan

== See also ==
- Esens (disambiguation)
- Essen (disambiguation)
