= Cold Feet series 8 =

Cold Feet
- Series 8
- No. of episodes: 6

Release
- Original network: ITV1
- Original release: 14 January – 18 February 2019

Series chronology
- ← Previous; Series 7

The eighth series of the British comedy-drama television series Cold Feet aired on the ITV network during January 2019.

== Cast ==
=== Main ===
- James Nesbitt as Adam Williams
- Robert Bathurst as David Marsden
- Hermione Norris as Karen Marsden
- John Thomson as Pete Gifford
- Fay Ripley as Jenny Gifford
- Ceallach Spellman as Matt Williams

=== Supporting ===
- Jacey Salles as Ramona Ramirez
- Daisy Edgar-Jones as Olivia Marsden
- Sylvie Briggs as Ellie Marsden
- Jack Harper as Adam Gifford
- Madeleine Edmondson as Chloe Gifford
- Siobhan Finneran as Nikki Kirkbright
- Lucy Robinson as Robyn Duff
- Eve Myles as Karen's friend and Adam's love interest – Caitlin Henderson

== Episodes ==
No.	Title	Directed by	Written by	Original release date	Viewers (millions)
48	Episode 1	Rebecca Gatward	Mike Bullen	14 January 2019.	6.02
After suffering a few knockbacks, Adam starts to question whether he’s lost his mojo until he catches the eye of attractive young barista, Gemma. He’s initially cautious, but when she makes the first move and he decides to go for it, Matt’s reaction takes him by surprise. Mature student Jenny’s been throwing herself into uni life but all that looks set to change when she receives some unexpected news. Meanwhile, Pete bravely saves a young lad, Evan, from drowning but his efforts aren’t as appreciated as he might have liked.
49	Episode 2	Rebecca Gatward	Mike Bullen	21 January 2019.	5.45
Adam agrees to a suggestion from Karen and agrees to drama therapy. There, he understands some of his more unlikeable facets. Pete befriends a man he saved from a river, who is undergoing depression. Jenny's fears are revealed when she is informed that she has breast cancer. David accepts that his girlfriend will provide for both of them, while Karen warns her daughters of the dangers of the internet.
50	Episode 3	Rebecca Gatward	Mark Brotherhood	28 January 2019.	5.50
The gang go to a music festival to support Adam and his band. David enjoys the perks of festival life a little too much, Adam and Karen try to out-festival each other and Jenny lives it up with her college friends.
51	Episode 4	John Hardwick	Jan McVerry	4 February 2019.	5.49
David is homeless and penniless. Jenny has a lumpectomy. Karen sets Adam up to date her friend Caitlin.
52	Episode 5	John Hardwick	Debbie Oates & Ian Kershaw	11 February 2019.	5.46
David is living in an airport, until his friends realise and rally round. Jenny starts chemotherapy. Chloe, Jenny's daughter, asks Pete to adopt her. Adam splits up with Caitlin, and he and Karen finally admit their feelings for each other.
53	Episode 6	John Hardwick	Mike Bullen	18 February 2019.	5.58
Adam and Karen are enjoying the excitement of their fledging relationship, but are all too aware that their secret will need to come out sometime.

== Production ==
ITV commissioned an eighth series of Cold Feet, the third since its 2016 revival, on 30 October 2017. The series began filming in Manchester on 19 March 2018 and continued until July. It will begin airing in January 2019.
