= Gijs van Hall =

Dutch politician (1904–1977)

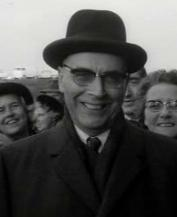
- Gijs van Hall in 1968

Mayor of Amsterdam
- In office 1 February 1957 – 1 July 1967
- Preceded by: Arnold Jan d'Ailly
- Succeeded by: P. J. Koets (interim)

Member of the Senate
- In office 31 July 1956 – 10 May 1971

Personal details
- Born: Gijsbert van Hall; 21 April 1904 Amsterdam, Netherlands
- Died: 22 May 1977 (aged 73) Amsterdam, Netherlands
- Party: PvdA
- Spouse: Emma Nijhoff (m. 1928)
- Children: 3

Gijsbert "Gijs" van Hall (21 April 1904 – 22 May 1977) was a Dutch banker, resistance member and senator. He was Mayor of Amsterdam between 1957 and 1967.

== Early life and banking career ==
Gijs van Hall was born in Amsterdam in an influential Dutch family of bankers. At a young age, much of his early school career was interrupted due to infections of tuberculosis. Between 1923 and 1928 he studied law at the University of Leiden.

Van Hall went in 1928 to work at the American investment firm Kean, Taylor & co., a temporary assignment where he hoped to gain experience with the financial system that he could use back home. He worked on Wall Street in New York City for three years before returning to the Netherlands to work at the Nederlandse Trust Maatschappij. During much of the 1930s, he was involved in guiding debt restructuring procedures caused by the Great Depression. During the restructuring of the Leerdam glass factory, he became interested in the idea of consulting workers to opine on company decisions in order to foster trust between workers and upper management.

== Dutch resistance movement ==
During the German occupation of the Netherlands Gijs van Hall co-founded the Nationaal Steunfonds (NSF) with his brother Walraven van Hall, which financed much of the operations of the Dutch resistance forces. Whilst his brother Walraven had connections with the resistance and is regarded as the leading figure behind the plot, Gijs leveraged his knowledge of finance and his position from inside the bank to write out false government bonds, which would ultimately raise a total of 83 million guilders in illegal loans to victims of the occupation and Dutch resistance fighters; equivalent to 450 million Euros as of 2021. With the help of ex-director of the Zaandam artillery factory Frans den Hollander, funds were distributed clandestinely as government unemployment grants to fund (amongst others) armed resistance fighters, intelligence units, refugee shelters, the railroad strike of 1944, the Dutch navy in exile, and the resistance press.

== Senator ==
After the war, Van Hall became politically active within the Partij van de Arbeid (PvdA). He continued his work within banking as the director of Labouchère and Co. in 1948. In 1956 he was selected as a senator for the PvdA. Within the senate he was the PvdA's spokesperson on financial policy. Van Hall filled the vacancy for mayor of Amsterdam only a year thereafter, but stayed on as a senator throughout his entire tenure as mayor. He was re-elected in 1960, 1963 and 1966, then chose not to run for office again in 1971.

== Mayor of Amsterdam ==
On 1 February 1957, Van Hall took office as mayor of Amsterdam. During his time in office the city underwent major changes, including the construction of the IJtunnel, the first phase of the Bijlmermeer expansions, and the expansion of the University of Amsterdam. Van Hall frequently lobbied the national government over the execution and funding of large projects. He was characterized as a tough negotiator who preferred to rule the city without too much outside interference.

Van Hall attracted controversy over his response to Vietnam War protests in 1961, where a crowd that shouted "Johnson murderer" was found in violation of insulting the leader of an allied state, an offense at the time. An underfunded police force faced with the impossible task of arresting thousands of protesters resorted to violence to disperse the crowd instead. In the following years, riots and police violence would divide Amsterdam politically, with the police escalating more frequently as the scale of protests rose. Within this climate rose the Provo movement, which further sought out to provoke the police through non-violent action in order to get the media to report on police violence. Protesters and the public would blame Van Hall for police violence, whilst the Ministry of Justice raised their doubts on Van Hall's capability to maintain order. Van Hall's response was reportedly distant from the police, and a falling out with police commissioner Van Der Molen made further communication limited.

The final straw in Van Hall's career as mayor was a construction workers strike in June 1966, where 1 protester died; officially from a heart attack, but it was widely believed that police violence was to blame. In 1967, after investigations from the national government into the civil unrest, the Ministry of the Interior gave Van Hall the ultimatum to either be fired from his position or resign voluntarily. He chose not to resign so he could to await the report that outlined his failings, and was fired as mayor of Amsterdam on June 30, 1967. His resignation actually calmed the civil unrest in Amsterdam, as the Provos disbanded themselves after Van Hall's removal from office.

== The Resistance Banker ==
In 2018, The Resistance Banker (Dutch: Bankier van het Verzet), a dramatized cinematic film on the resistance actions of Walraven Van Hall was released, starring Jacob Derwig as Gijs van Hall.
