= Cold Feet series 7 =

Cold Feet
- Series 7
- No. of episodes: 7

Release
- Original network: ITV1
- Original release: 8 September – 20 October 2017

Series chronology
- ← Previous; Series 6 Next → Series 8

The seventh series of the British comedy-drama television series Cold Feet began broadcasting on the ITV network on 8 September 2017. There are seven episodes and it is the second full series of Cold Feet since 2003 since it was revived in 2016.

== Cast ==
=== Main ===
- James Nesbitt as Adam Williams
- Robert Bathurst as David Marsden
- Hermione Norris as Karen Marsden
- John Thomson as Pete Gifford
- Fay Ripley as Jenny Gifford
- Leanne Best as Tina Reynolds
- Ceallach Spellman as Matt Williams

=== Supporting ===
- Jacey Salles as Ramona Ramirez
- Daisy Edgar-Jones as Olivia Marsden
- Ella Hunt as Ellie Marsden
- Jack Harper as Adam Gifford
- Madeleine Edmondson as Chloe Gifford
- Siobhan Finneran as Nikki Kirkbright
- Robert Glenister as George Kirkbright
- Paul Ritter as Benjamin Stevens
- Lucy Robinson as Robyn Duff
- Amy Huberman as Sarah Poynter
- Alastair Mackenzie as Jamie Poynter
- Ruth Madeley as Tracey McHarrie
- Shannon Hayes as Bridie Sellers
- Marji Campi as Barbara Blyth
- Sally Rogers as Sheila Blyth
- Eileen O'Brien as Vera Goulbourne
- Ziggy Heath as Luke Harris
- Faith Alabi as Eliza Schumacher
- Aaron Cobham as Jules Watson
- Izabella Malewska as Receptionist

=== Guest ===
- Peter Jones, Deborah Meaden, Touker Suleyman, Jenny Campbell, and Tej Lalvani as themselves

== Episodes ==
No.	Title	Directed by	Written by	Original release date	Viewers (millions)
41	Episode 1	Terry McDonough	Mike Bullen	8 September 2017	6.46
Karen celebrates the success of her first client, novelist Bridie Sellers, at a launch party – unlike David, who, after the scandal, is reduced to selling life insurance to old ladies. Pete, however, offers him an escape route, as financial advisor to wealthy Nikki Kirkbright, though his first day could have gone better. Adam secures IT work with charismatic American CEO Sarah Poynter and moves back into his old house with Matthew and David as his lodger. After initial hesitation Tina also joins them whilst Jenny fears the sack for whistle-blowing but is promoted instead.
42	Episode 2	Terry McDonough	Mike Bullen	15 September 2017	5.61
After a successful house-warming Adam suggests to Tina that they have a baby but she is unsure and he allows his friends to dissuade him so he is confused when she accuses him of making decisions without her. He is also shocked to learn that Tina had an affair with Sarah's husband, whilst Matthew also springs another, unwelcome, surprise. Jenny starts to regret her promotion when she has to fire the disabled Tracey whilst Karen is troubled when nosey accountant Benjamin Stevens discovers that her sole client, Bridie, is unable to write a second book and is hitting the bottle. Pete starts work at a retirement home whilst David meets the married Nikki in secret before being taken for a ride.
43	Episode 3	Louise Hooper	Mike Bullen & James Wood	22 September 2017	5.67
David is confronted by Nikki's wealthy, uncouth husband George but, having concealed the fact that Nikki wants a divorce, is given a job as George's financial advisor. Karen, already feeling harassed by Stevens, is angry with Adam and Matthew when she discovers Matthew has impregnated her daughter Olivia whilst David is annoyed to hear the news from ex-wife Robyn. There is, however, ultimate reconciliation between the two families when the youngsters decide on a termination. Meanwhile Jenny, still mad with Pete for employing Tracey at the retirement home, is further displeased when her sister Sheila jets off to Canada to meet her Internet date, leading Pete to suggest her elderly mother Barbara moves in with them.
44	Episode 4	Louise Hooper	Mike Bullen & James Wood	29 September 2017	5.95
Adam is horrified to see that a sex tape Tina made with Sarah's husband Jamie three years earlier is doing the rounds on the net and reacts by punching Jamie. Tina is not impressed, undermining Adam's performance in bed and seeming to join with Jamie in being unashamed. David starts work for George Kirkbright but is perturbed by his violent nature whilst also trying to find ways in which Karen can prevent Stevens from buying her out. None come to fruition but when Karen considers remortgaging her house David steps in to provide damage limitation. Jenny and Pete have their own problems with Barbara's apparent absent-mindedness – until resentful daughter Chloe comes clean.
45	Episode 5	Terry McDonough	Mike Bullen	6 October 2017	5.50
The atmosphere between Tina and himself still frosty Adam goes on a team building exercise, aware that Sarah will also be there. Inevitably one thing leads to another – which seems to mean more to Adam than Sarah. David encourages Nikki to leave George, devising a plan to put her husband's assets in her name, but Karen, facing rebellion from her daughters and her publishing company diminished, has her sobriety tested and Pete proves to be an unexpected saviour before her family regroups to support her. Meanwhile Jenny, having pushed reluctant son Adam to consider university admission, is made aware of her own potential as a mature student.
46	Episode 6	Terry McDonough	Mike Bullen	13 October 2017	5.84
Pete and Adam plan a joint fiftieth birthday party at a country hotel, though Adam is still fighting his feelings for Sarah and trying to reconnect with Tina. Meanwhile Jenny starts her business course on a day release basis but is annoyed by Pete's laziness and insistence on Barbara staying with them. Romance is in the air however for Karen, having met handsome builder Gareth in a book-shop, and David with Nikki, who has fled her boorish husband. At the birthday party Jenny argues publicly with Pete whilst Adam is shocked when Sarah turns up, declaring her love for him.
47	Episode 7	Terry McDonough	Mike Bullen	20 October 2017	5.87
The next morning Nikki and David are the only happy couple as Tina leaves Adam and Sarah tells him she put the sex tape on line out of revenge whilst Pete moves out of the family home. David also joins the ranks of the unhappy when Kirkbright, aware of the affair with Nikki, threatens his daughters, leading to David taking drastic action to win Nikki from him. Meanwhile an accident to their son reconciles the Giffords, Karen makes Gareth come clean to keep what they have got and Adam ends up with the lady of his choice.

== Production ==
On 17 October 2016, ITV renewed Cold Feet for a seventh series consisting of seven episodes, following a positive response of sixth series from television critics and viewers. Filming for the series began in March 2017 in Manchester, and concluded on 30 June 2017. It was announced on 15 August 2017, that Siobhan Finneran had joined the cast of the upcoming series. The series will begin airing from 8 September. In episode 6, The Dragons from the BBC television series Dragons' Den appeared as themselves in a dream sequence.
