= Arnold Jan d'Ailly =

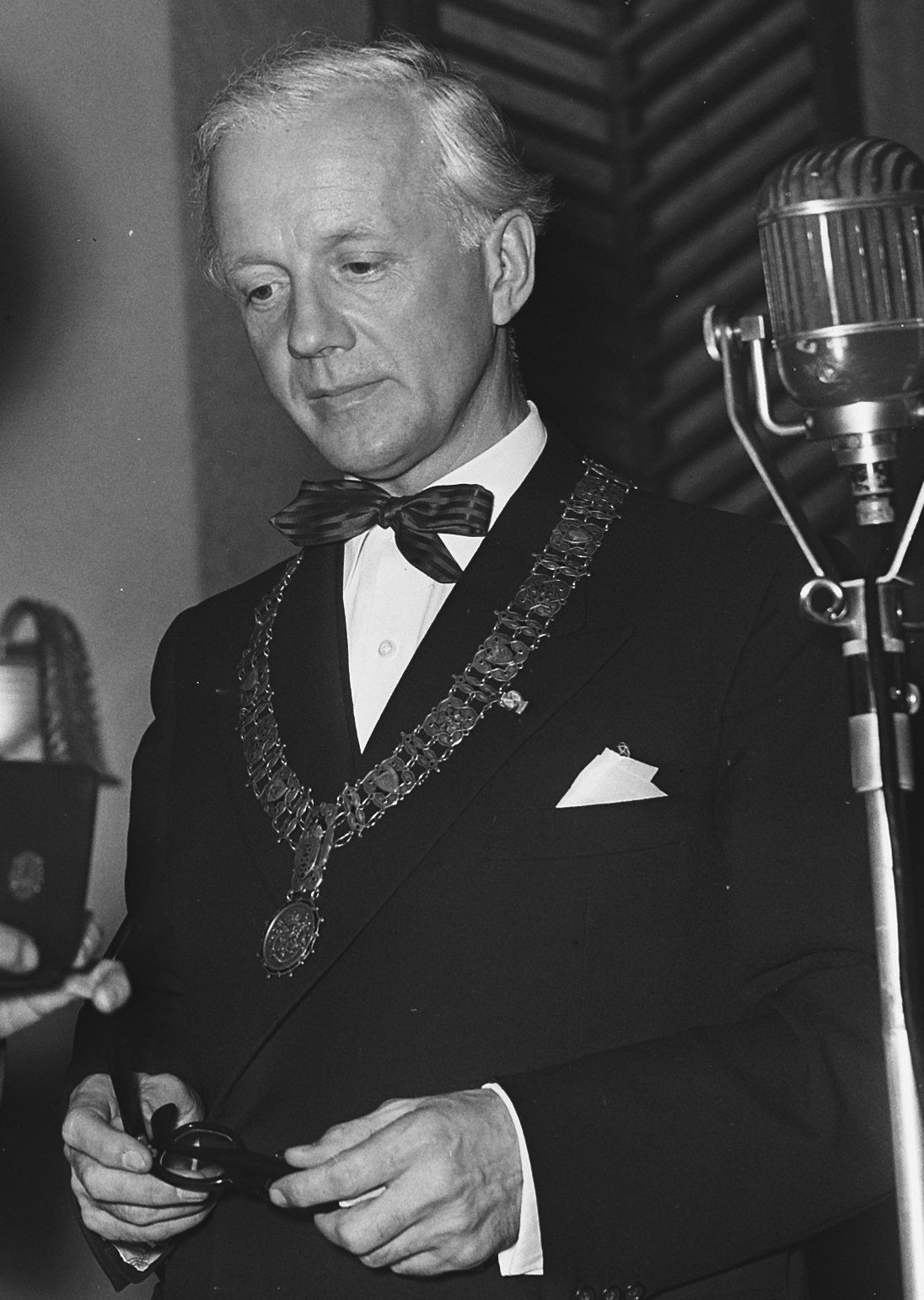

Mayor of Amsterdam
- In office 23 September 1946 – 1 January 1957
- Preceded by: Feike de Boer
- Succeeded by: Gijs van Hall

Personal details
- Born: 6 February 1902 Franeker, Netherlands
- Died: 24 November 1967 (aged 65) Amsterdam, Netherlands
- Party: PvdA

Arnold Jan d'Ailly was mayor of Amsterdam between 1946 and 1956.

== Pre-political career ==
Arnold Jan d'Ailly was born in Franeker and grew up in Doesburg, Gelderland as the son of a general practitioner. After completing his Gymnasium Alfa exam, d'Ailly studied law at the University of Amsterdam, completing his doctorate in 1926. He subsequently became a lawyer and court clerk at the Amsterdam courthouse. In October 1929 d'Ailly traded his job in law for a range of jobs in the financial sector, so he could earn money to support his father in law, whose business had gone bankrupt following the Wall Street crash of 1929. As third secretary of the Amsterdam stock exchange, he rose the corporate ranks. In his private life, he married Anna Fritz in 1930 and had five children, one of which died at childbirth.

In 1940, d'Ailly was promoted to director of the KAS-Vereeniging bank. He was notably cautious during the German occupation of the Netherlands between 1940 and 1945 and refused to let the KAS-Vereeniging join the Nationaal Steunfonds until 1944, despite being prompted several times and being one of only two Dutch banks to not join the Nationaal Steunfonds. After 1944, he assisted in financing the 1944 railway strike that intended to break down German logistics during operation Market garden.

== Labour party membership ==
Arnold Jan d'Ailly had never publicly shown an interest in politics, until he joined the recently founded Labour Party in 1946. After the war d'Ailly was considered but passed for the position of minister of finance in the Schermerhorn–Drees cabinet, and continued serving in finance where he climbed the ranks to become board member of the Central Bank of the Netherlands, as well as head of the Herstelbank, a financial institute tasked with managing funds for the wartime recovery. At this point in time, d'Ailly enjoyed a position of status amongst Amsterdam socialites.

== Mayor of Amsterdam ==
After the Second World War, Amsterdam was temporarily led by Dutch resistance member Feike de Boer. Arnold Jan d'Ailly was selected to replace him. Under his tenure, Amsterdam would recover from the damage done by the war. He spearheaded infrastructure projects such as the completion of the Amsterdam–Rhine Canal, the Utrechtseweg highway, the expansion of the Amsterdam docks, and the recovery of Schiphol international airport. He also expanded Amsterdam with the new suburbs at Bos en Lommer, Geuzenveld, Slotervaart and Slotermeer. Between 1952 and 1956, Arnold Jan d'Ailly's was also the head of the Council of Municipalities (Vereniging der Nederlandse Gemeenten, VNG).

In 1949, in response to the Czechoslovak coup d'état one year earlier, Arnold Jan d'Ailly fired aldermen Ben Polak and Leen Seegers of the Communist Party on the Amsterdam council, a move that was on uneven footing with municipal law at the time. As a result of the decision, a fight broke out on the municipal council floor.

In 1951, Jan d'Ailly left the Labour party over a conflict between premier Willem Drees and party leader Marinus van der Goes van Naters.

Arnold Jan d'Ailly was described as a mayor with a charming and down to earth personality, and well liked by his peers. He attended a wide variety of social gatherings with common residents of Amsterdam. On occasion, he'd give street children a lift in his car. d'Ailly was equally on good terms with the Dutch royal family, and took part in the commission that assisted Princess Beatrix in her ascendency to queen.

d'Ailly was a frequent flyer who travelled to as many as 40 foreign cities to promote Amsterdam trade relations. This earned him the nickname "the flying mayor". In a cartoon by Jo Spier, he was titled "Mayor d' Ailleurs" (French: "mayor of Elsewhere").

== Retirement and later life ==
In 1956 d'Ailly announced his retirement as mayor of Amsterdam. Though he claimed it was time for a new political wind in Amsterdam, in actuality an affair he held with famous artist Gisele van der Gracht made him lose his favour with Queen Juliana, who held the authority to appoint and fire mayors. d'Ailly did not attempt to re-enter any political office.

Arnold Jan D'Ailly returned to the financial sector, and became director of the Nationale Handelsbank NV in 1957. He retired completely in 1960.
