= Tamsin van Essen =

Ceramicist

- Education: Balliol College, Oxford; Central Saint Martins; Royal College of Art

Tamsin van Essen is a ceramicist, potter and sculptor based in London. Her first exhibition was at Galerie Vernon in Prague in 2008.

For an exhibition about skin at the Wellcome Collection, she produced a series of apothecary's jars which illustrated the nature of skin conditions such as psoriasis. The jars are now on permanent display as "Medical Heirlooms" in Wellcome's Being Human gallery. In her Erosion series of works, she continued the biomedical theme, using a sandblasting technique to portray the effects of bacteria and viruses.
