= Nikolai Ottovich von Essen =

Russian admiral

- Николай Оттович фон Эссен
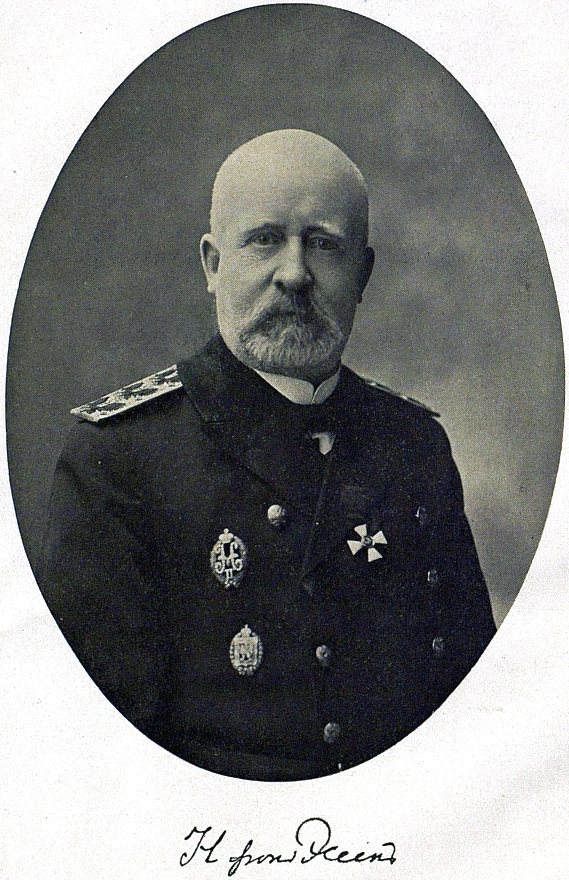
- Admiral Nikolai Ottovich von Essen, 1913.

Commander of the Imperial Baltic Fleet
- In office 3 December [O.S. 20 November] 1909 – 7 May [O.S. 24 April] 1915
- Monarch: Nicholas II
- Prime Minister: Pyotr Stolypin; Vladimir Kokovtsov; Ivan Goremykin
- Preceded by: position established
- Succeeded by: Vasily Kanin

Personal details
- Born: 11 December [O.S. 29 November] 1860 Saint Petersburg, Russian Empire
- Died: 7 May [O.S. 24 April] 1915 (aged 54) Reval, Governorate of Estonia, Russian Empire
- Resting place: Novodevichy Cemetery

Military service
- Allegiance: Russian Empire
- Branch/service: Imperial Russian Navy
- Years of service: 1880–1915
- Rank: Admiral
- Commands: Cruiser Novik; Battleship Sevastopol; Cruiser Rurik; Imperial Baltic Fleet
- Battles/wars: Russo-Japanese War; World War I

Nikolai Ottovich von (Note: In German personal names, von is a preposition which approximately means 'of' or 'from' and usually denotes some sort of nobility. While von (always lower case) is part of the family name or territorial designation, not a first or middle name, if the noble is referred to by their last name, use Schiller, Clausewitz or Goethe, not von Schiller, etc.) Essen (Russian: Николай Оттович Эссен, tr. Nikolay Ottovich Essen; 23 December [O.S. 11 December] 1860 – 20 May [O.S. 7 May] 1915) was a Russian naval commander and admiral descended from the Baltic German noble Essen family. For more than a century, his ancestors had served in the Imperial Russian Navy, and seven had been awarded the Order of St. George, the highest military award of the Russian Empire. Essen was regarded as one of the most prominent admirals of the Russian naval force during World War I (1914–1918).

== Biography ==
Coat of arms of the Essen family

Nikolai Ottovich von Essen was born on 23 December [O.S. 11 December] 1860 in St. Petersburg, Russia, to Imperial Senator Otto Wilhelm von Essen, into the wealthy noble family of Essen. Early on in his life, Essen received home education; he was well-educated and fluent in English, French, Russian, and his native German. He graduated from the Naval Cadet Corps in 1880, after a two-year foreign cruise, attended the engineering department of the Nikolayev Naval Academy from 1883 to 1886. He was commissioned as a lieutenant in 1891 and served with the Russian Pacific Fleet from 1892 to 1896, and with the Russian Mediterranean Squadron from 1897.

In the early part of his career, he commanded Minesweeper No. 120 (1897–98), the gunboat Grozyachiy (1898–1900), and the steamship Slavianka (1901–1902) in the Black Sea. After a brief assignment as an instructor at the Naval Cadet Corps, he was appointed captain of the cruiser Novik (1902–1904), which was stationed at Vladivostok.

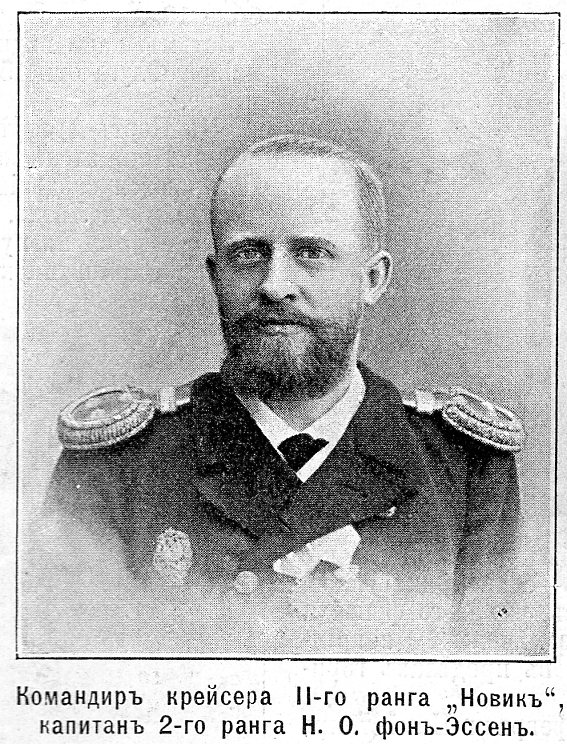
Nikolai von Essen as commander of Novik

At the start of the Russo-Japanese War, Admiral Stepan Makarov reassigned Essen to command the battleship Sevastopol at Port Arthur. After the Battle of the Yellow Sea, Essen also commanded the land-based defences at the entrance to Port Arthur. During the last weeks of the Japanese siege, he moved Sevastopol out of the relative safety of the inner harbour to use her firepower to help repulse repeated Japanese attacks. However, on hearing of the surrender of Port Arthur, he moved Sevastopol into deeper water and then scuttled her, making her the only battleship that the Imperial Japanese Navy could not raise after the war. He was sent as a prisoner of war to Japan, but was paroled after less than two months, and returned to St Petersburg to a hero's welcome. For his actions, Essen was awarded the Order of St. George (3rd degree) and promoted to captain. In early 1905 he was sent to Crete to meet with Nikolai Nebogatov who was commanding the 3rd pacific fleet that was proceeding to the pacific to fight the Battle of Tsushima and provide him with information about events of the battles around Port Arthur. .

After the end of the war, Essen became the first captain of the British-built armoured cruiser Rurik. He was promoted to rear admiral in 1908 and appointed commander-in-chief of the Russian Baltic Fleet in 1909 when this position was created. He was promoted to admiral in 1913. Essen, from lessons learned in the war against Japan and the mutiny of the Black Sea Fleet, urged far-reaching reforms and modernisation of the Imperial Russian Navy. He recognised early the importance of submarines and aircraft, and sought to promote younger officers based on their knowledge of modern strategy and tactics, also establishing a naval training academy at Kronstadt. Above all, he pushed for the operational autonomy of the Baltic Fleet.

Widely regarded as the most able of Russian admirals in World War I, Essen led the Baltic Fleet energetically during the first year of the war. His forces at the time consisted of four battleships, five cruisers, four light cruisers, 62 torpedo boats, 12 submarines and numerous smaller and specialised units. His superiors preferred a cautious defensive position in the Baltic Sea, forcing Essen to concentrate his forces in the Gulf of Finland to protect Petrograd, with older units in the Gulf of Riga, and effectively abandoning Liepāja to the Germans. Nevertheless, on 9 August 1914, Essen led part of his fleet towards Gotland with the intent to contain the Swedish navy and deliver a note of his own making which would have violated Swedish neutrality and may have brought Sweden into the war. He was ordered back before his plan could be executed. However, on 27 August 1914, he assigned Rurik and Pallada to commerce raiding operations in the Baltic. Although of little success, the mission went a long way towards maintaining morale within the Baltic Fleet.

== Family and descendants ==
Essen died unexpectedly after a short bout of pneumonia in May 1915. He is buried in the Novodevichy Cemetery (Saint Petersburg). He was survived by his wife, Mary, and son Anthony (who was later killed in action as commander of the submarine AG-14 on 24 October 1917), and three daughters who married naval officers.

Anthony had a son, Nikolai Antonovich (11 July 1916), who was eight months old at his death. In 1935, Nikolai and his mother, Natalya Alexandrovna Bock, were exiled to Kostanay.

== Awards and commemoration ==
- Golden Sword for Bravery (14 March 1904)
- Order of St. George (4th class), (17 April 1905)
- Order of the White Eagle with Swords (12 December 1914)

The second ship of the Admiral Grigorovich class of frigates is named Admiral Essen to commemorate the admiral.

== Sources ==
- Kosiarz, Edmund (1979). Pierwsza Wojna Światowa na Bałtyku (in Polish). Gdańsk: Wydawnictwo Morskie. ISBN 83-215-3234-9.
- Halpern, Paul G. (1994). A Naval History of World War I. London: UCL Press. ISBN 1-85728-295-7.
- Spencer C. Tucker, Who's Who in Twentieth Century Warfare, Routledge, London & New York 2001 (pg. 92) ISBN 0-415-23497-2
- Flodin, Matz (2005). Flottans underrättelsetjänst 1887-1914 (The Swedish Naval Intelligence 1887–1914). Karlskrona: Marinmuseum. ISSN 1404-0581 http://libris.kb.se/bib/10297983
- Kowner, Rotem (2006). Historical Dictionary of the Russo-Japanese War. The Scarecrow Press. ISBN 0-8108-4927-5.
