= August Franz Essen =

Saxonian diplomat

August Franz Essen (1720–1792) was a Saxonian diplomat. He represented the Electorate of Saxony in Poland, residing in Gdańsk (Danzig) from 1761 to 1763, and then in Warsaw until his death in 1792. Originally named August Franz Essenius, he became Essenius von Essen in 1767.
