= Siri von Essen =

Finland-Swedish actress (1850–1912)

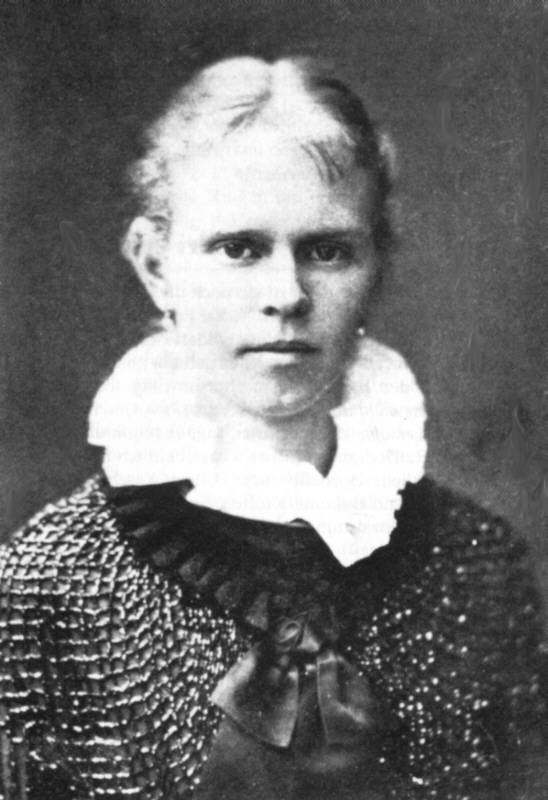
- Siri von Essen in 1880
- Born: Sigrid Sofia Matilda Elisabet von Essen; 17 August 1850; Porvoo (Borgå), Grand Duchy of Finland, Russian Empire
- Died: 21 April 1912 (aged 61); Helsinki, Grand Duchy of Finland, Russian Empire
- Spouses: Carl Gustaf Wrangel af Sauss (m. 1872; div. 1876) August Strindberg (m. 1877; div. 1891)
- Children: 5, including Karin
- Parents: Carl Reinhold von Essen (father); Elisabeth Charlotta In de Betou (mother)
- Relatives: Von Essen family

Sigrid "Siri" Sofia Matilda Elisabet von Essen (17 August 1850 – 21 April 1912) was a Swedish-speaking Finnish noblewoman and actress. Her acting career spanned about 15 years, during which time she appeared in a number of plays that her then husband the Swedish dramatist and writer August Strindberg wrote specifically for her.

== Biography ==
=== Family and personal life ===
She was born in Porvoo, the daughter of the noble Finnish-Swedish captain, landowner and nobleman Carl Reinhold von Essen and Elisabeth Charlotta In de Betou. She married Major Baron Carl Gustaf Wrangel af Sauss (1842–1913) in 1872, with whom she had a daughter, Sigrid. They divorced in 1876.

In 1877, she married the Swedish dramatist and writer August Strindberg. At the time, her marriage to Strindberg was considered a scandal because although von Essen's first husband had committed adultery, Strindberg was blamed for the dissolution of their marriage. A contributing factor to the scandal was that Strindberg was considered socially unsuitable as a husband for a member of the nobility. Together they had four children: three daughters, Kerstin (born 1878), died shortly after birth, Karin Smirnov (born 1880) and Greta (born 1881), and a son, Hans (born 1884 in Lausanne, Switzerland). They divorced in 1891, after Strindberg had suspected von Essen of having a long-term affair with her close friend, the Danish woman Marie David; Strindberg's jealousy and dislike of David caused severe discord in the marriage during its last years, and in 1891 he assaulted David. The troubled marriage between von Essen and Strindberg was a source of material for a number of Strindberg's plays, which often feature unhappy relationships, as well as for Strindberg's novel Defence of a Fool, which he began in 1887. (Note: The novel was originally written in French, and its title, Le Plaidoyer d'un Fou, has also been translated as The Confession of a Fool, A Madman's Defence, and A Fool's Apology) In 1919, a selection of their correspondence from 1875 to 1876 was published under the title He and Her; Strindberg had aimed to have this selection printed already in the mid-1880s as a sequel to his autobiographical novel The Son of the Servant Woman, but his publishers had refused.

Von Essen moved to Finland in 1893.

=== Acting career ===
Von Essen herself had wanted to be an actress since childhood, but this was not regarded as a suitable profession for a noblewoman. She was prevented from acting first by her father and later by her first husband, which was one reason she divorced him. Strindberg, however, encouraged her to take up acting. She did not enroll in the Royal Dramatic Training Academy, instead studying drama privately under the tutelage of Knut Almlöf and Betty Deland.

In early 1877, she debuted at the Royal Dramatic Theatre in Stockholm in two works. She took the role of Camille in A Theatre Play ""En Teaterpjäs" by Louis Leroy and the title role of Jane Eyre in a play by Charlotte Birch-Pfeiffer. Her debut was considered a moderate success, and she took up an engagement as an actor at the Royal Dramatic Theatre that lasted until 1881. She also performed at the Swedish theater in Helsinki, Finland, during the period 1882–93. She was a director and leading lady at a Scandinavian experimental theater founded by Strindberg in Copenhagen in 1889, where she played the title role in Miss Julie and Mme X in The Stronger. She worked as an acting tutor in Helsinki from 1894; one of her students was Martha Hedman.

Although critics generally commended her grace, her natural way of acting, and the intelligence of her interpretations, they also noted that her performances lacked energy and passion and that she had a weak voice. Strindberg wrote several plays for her that were designed to showcase her acting style—among these are counted Miss Julie and The Creditors (playing Tekla, the wife of one character and ex-wife of another in the three-character play)—and she is considered to have succeeded best in these roles.

After 1877, von Essen wrote articles for newspapers and publications and translated plays. She was a reporter for Morgenbladet newspaper in Helsingfors, Finland, in 1876 and in Copenhagen, Denmark in 1881. She continued with her translation work after she moved to Finland in 1893. She also gave concert recitals.

== In popular culture ==
- In 1978 Swedish author Per Olov Enquist premiered his Strindberg-focused play The Night of the Tribades: A Play from 1889 (later retitled The Tribades), in which von Essen is a key character.

== Citations, notes and references ==
=== Cited sources ===
- Sigrid (Siri) Sofia Matilda Elisabet Essen, von, urn:sbl:15517, Svenskt biografiskt lexikon (art av Torsten Eklund.), hämtad 2014-03-05.
- Dotti, Marco. 2010. "Lettere da un inferno futuro. Strindberg, dieci appunti nella vita del Padre", in Saveria Chemotti (ed.), Padri nostri. Archetipi e modelli delle relazioni tra padri e figlie, Padova: Il Poligrafo,2010, pp. 281–298. ISBN 978-8871157146.
- Enquist, Per Olov. Plays: 1: The Night of Tribades, Rain Snakes, The Hour of the Lynx, The Image Makers. London: Bloomsbury, 2004.
- Lagercrantz, Olof. August Strindberg. Trans. Anselm Hollo. New York: Farrar Straus Giroux, 1984.
- Meyer, Michael. 1985. Strindberg: A Biography. Oxford Lives ser. Oxford: Oxford UP, 1987. ISBN 0-19-281995-X.
- Robinson, Michael, ed. The Cambridge Companion to August Strindberg. Cambridge: Cambridge University Press, 2009.
- Schluessner, Ellie, transl; Strindberg, August (1912). The Confession of a Fool.London: Stephen Swift.
