= Peppi & Kokki =

Comedy duo from the Netherlands

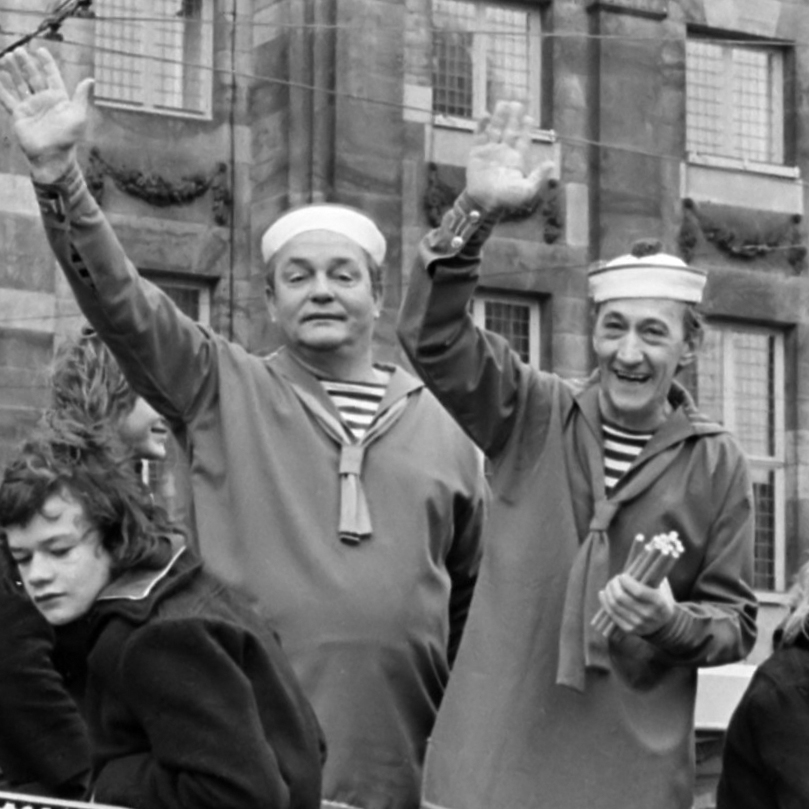
Peppi en Kokki (1974)

Peppi & Kokki were a Laurel & Hardy-style comedy duo from the Netherlands; they had their own television series in the 1970s. Gerard van Essen (1924–1997) played fat Peppi, Herman Kortekaas (1930) played lean Kokki.

== History ==
=== Early years ===
Gerard van Essen began his career in the 1940s at the circus with his brother Jacques as the Kame Brothers; he adopted the stagename John. When Jacques quit in 1957, he found a replacement in stalwart Herman Kortekaas.

Throughout the 1960s, they performed as clowns Pipo & Kiko and made their television debut in 1971. There was one small problem; there was already a televised clown called Pipo (Pipo de Clown); thus, the duo changed their names to Peppi & Kokki.

=== Television series ===
In 1972, Peppi & Kokki started working on a slapstick series for broadcast on KRO children's television; they portrayed two sailors forced to take odd jobs because their inherited ship (Alma) ceased to function.

The intro-footage, reshot by 1974, sees the pair waking up, having breakfast and fooling around rather than going to work.

Peppi & Kokki wore vintage blue suits, white hats and Charlie Chaplin-style shoes, although Peppi would later switch over to sneakers.

The voices were muted out in favour of a ragtime piano and narration. Later episodes ended with a song recapturing the event.

=== Peppi & Kokki; the movie ===
In 1976 a spoken movie was taped; Peppi & Kokki bij de Marine begins with a trip to the beach (one of the series' recurring subjects) where a bomb is discovered. Peppi & Kokki end up on a ship solving the mystery of a captain who receives death-threats which actually serve to prepare him for his 50th birthday. The movie was later serialised in the same manner as the regular episodes.

=== The end and next ===
The duo split in 1979 because Kortekaas had contracted a hernia. Van Essen unsuccessfully continued with a replacement before touring as a solo-artist on the (children's) party-circuit.

Van Essen celebrated his 50th career-anniversary in 1992, the same year that Peppi & Kokki were introduced to a new generation; he died on January 2, 1997, during a holiday in Thailand, shortly after learning about the Peppi & Kokki-theme-tune getting a happy hardcore-make-over (Gabber Piet's Hakke & Zage).

Meanwhile, Kortekaas returned to children's entertainment but also appeared in a variety of movies and television series, notably Zeg 'ns Aaa in which he played the brother-in-law of Carry Tefsen who once guested in Peppi & Kokki. Between 1995 and 2005 he played a bartender in the successful crime-series Baantjer.

=== Merchandise ===
Some episodes were available on video in the mid-1980s. In 2004 a three-part DVD was released in celebration of their 30th anniversary.

== Michael Jackson ==
On June 1, 1977, Peppi & Kokki were interviewed by talkshow-host Sonja Barend; backstage they met Michael Jackson who noted their similarities to Laurel & Hardy and triggered off a conversation about the comedians from the silent era. A 5-year-old fan of Peppi & Kokki joined in and had his picture taken with them.
