= John van Ess =

American Missionary

The Rev. Dr. John van Ess (1879–1949) was an American missionary for the American (Dutch) Reformed Church in Basra, Iraq from 1902 until his death in 1949, shortly before he planned to retire.

== Early life and education ==
Van Ess was born in New Holland, Michigan, and was educated at Hope College in Michigan and Princeton Theological Seminary, where he studied Semitic languages. In 1911, he married Dorothy Firmin (1885–1975).

== Career ==
Van Ess was sent to the Near East in 1902 by the Reformed Church of America. He was first posted to Bahrain to study Arabic. In 1903, Basra, Mesopotamia (now Iraq) became his base. He was a touring evangelist. His Turkish papers said he was a tall, harmless monk. He explored the Two Rivers in the southern region and successfully mapped the area where the Marsh Arabs (Ma'dan) lived on islands built of reeds. He traveled south to the Pirate Coast (now the United Arab Emirates), then north all the way to Istanbul, before he floated his raft, with a goat for milk, twelve watermelons, a bag of rice, his cargo of soap and supplies, six hundred miles along the Euphrates to Al-Fallujah.

In 1907–08, Van Ess acted as the official interpreter and local expert for a British survey led by William Willcocks to study the ancient irrigation systems.

He founded a school for boys, the School of High Hope, in Basra in 1912, and his wife a school for girls in the same city in 1914. Throughout the 1920s and 1930s, the school attracted students from all levels of society. With a curriculum that provided a high-school diploma recognized in the US, the institution became one of the most influential schools in Iraq. To commemorate Van Ess's 25th anniversary, local Muslim, Christian and Jewish leaders donated $1,800 to build High Hope the first science lab in the Near East.

John later became an advisor to the British authorities on the reconstruction of the education system in Iraq.

From 1914 to July 1915, he served as the temporary American consul in Basra. In 1914, while acting as American consul in Basra, he informed the British Commander, Sir John Nixon, who had landed nearby, that the Ottoman garrison had withdrawn from Basra, and that the city was undefended; the British then advanced into the city. He also found several secret agents to help Commander Nixon. A senior official in the British civil administration, latterly Acting Civil Commissioner in Iraq, Sir Arnold Wilson, said that during World War I, "Dr. Van Ess's advice and counsel were invaluable" and that he and his wife "were a valuable element in Basra and played throughout the campaign as before and after it, a useful and honorable part." (p. 188).

In 1917, he published a book, The Spoken Arabic of Mesopotamia (2nd ed. The Spoken Arabic of Iraq, 1938) which became a standard text for instructors. For example, Ephraim Avigdor Speiser, professor of comparative Semitic studies, assigned Van Ess's book at the University of Pennsylvania in the late 1920s. Agatha Christie referred to "getting on with Van Ess's spoken Arabic" in Come, Tell Me How You Live, her 1946 memoir about conducting research in Iraq with her husband, the archaeologist Max Mallowan.

== Iraq post-World War I ==
In 9th Inning in Mesopotamia, Van Ess wrote:

"I am not British, nor do I have any British affinity, but any fair minded man will have to admit that in Mesopotamia Britain is today showing the world that she is trying to live up to her programs of justice, magnanimity, and civilization."

Van Ess "was fully convinced that the presence of the British in Iraq was the best thing for the country." He disagreed with (1) bringing a non-Iraqi king into power and (2) with the notion that the majority of Iraqis wanted independence or were ready for it. Thus, he differed with the leading British specialists on Iraq, Col. T. E. Lawrence and Gertrude Bell, a close family friend. "Van Ess could not agree with her on much of her thinking about Iraq. He felt that she was too much of a romantic, believing only what she wanted to believe and that her limited knowledge of Arabic, of Arab women and home life – she had little interest in that part of Arab culture – and of Islam itself was a definite handicap to an objective assessment."

Van Ess wrote that Iraq, of which 7/8ths was tribal, should have been organized around tribal loyalty. "When Miss Bell and the other members of the Arab Bureau drew a line around Iraq and called it a political entity, they were flying in the face of four millenniums of history." From Van Ess' point of view, if the Iraqi masses had been consulted, the British would have known that the Iraqis first preferred rule under the Turks, then second rule under the British over independence. One of his reasons why the Iraqis were not ready for independence at that time was because less than twenty percent of the men and four percent of the women were literate. However, according to Van Ess, "All preferences except those favoring Feisal were airily swept aside by Miss Bell and her associates, who seemed to have the ear of the Colonial Office, and Feisal was proclaimed king on August 23, 1921, amid perfunctory enthusiasm, making "Feisal's task as King of Iraq [...] appallingly hard."

== Post-war Iraq and death ==
Just before his death in 1949, "Dr. Van Ess had accepted a post with the State Department as a special consultant on Near East affairs. He was to have assumed his duties upon his return to the United States from Iraq. However, he passed away. Instead Mrs. Van Ess took his place after her return."

== Personal life ==
Van Ess's wife Dorothy Van Ess (c. 1885 – 1975) was the author of several books about the Middle East. These included Pioneers in the Arab World, about missionaries from the Reformed Church in America who went to the Middle East.

Together they had a son, John, who was born in Basra. Like his father, John Jr. was fluent in Arabic. He graduated cum laude from Princeton University in 1938. After which, he returned to Iraq where he taught school in the American School for Boys and then served in the American Military Mission there until he died at age 26. They also had a daughter, Alice, who in Basra in 1949 married William D. Brewer, later the United States Ambassador to the Sudan. After her mother's death, Alice donated her mother's papers to Harvard University.

== Publications ==
- Van Ess, D. Pioneers in the Arab World. 1974. Grand Rapids, MI: W.B. Eerdmans Pub. Co.
- Van, Ess, J. Meet the Arab. 1943. New York, NY: John Day Company, Inc.
- Van Ess, J. The Spoken Arabic of Mesopotamia. 1917. Oxford University Press.
