= Essen family =

Baltic German/Swedish noble family

Essen
- noble family
- Coat of arms of the Essen family
- Country: Germany; Sweden; Russia; Finland
- Origin: Lääne län, Estonia
- Founder: Thomas von Essen
- Titles: Baron von Essen; Count von Essen
- Traditions: Lutheranism

The Essen family or von Essen is the name of a Baltic German noble family which later became part of the Swedish and Russian nobility.

== History ==
The first known ancestor was Thomas von Essen (d. 1615–1627) who was from Lääne län in Estonia. His son Alexander von Essen received Swedish nobility, but was not introduced in the Swedish House of Nobility. His descendants, Reinhold Wilhelm von Essen (1669–1732) and Hans Henrik von Essen (1674–1729), were elevated to Baron in 1717 and 1719. Hans Henrik von Essen was later elevated to comital rank.

Another was Magnus Gustav von Essen (1759–1813), a Russian lieutenant general and military governor of Riga. Nikolai von Essen (1860-1915), Admiral of the Imperial Russian Navy, hailed from the Livonian branch of the family, but not Count Peter Essen who was born a commoner.

== Notable family members ==
- Magnus Gustav von Essen (1759–1813), Russian general
- Hans Henric von Essen (1775–1824), Swedish statesman
- Carl Gustaf von Essen (1815—1895), Finnish Pietistic priest
- Fredrik von Essen (1831–1921), Swedish baron, Marshal of the Realm, and Minister of Finance
- Siri von Essen (1850–1912), Finnish-Swedish actress
- Nikolai Ottovich von Essen (1860–1915), Russian admiral
- Thomas Von Essen (b. 1945), American civilian administrator, New York City Fire Commissioner
- Max von Essen (b. 1974), American actor and singer
- Jonas von Essen (b. 1991), Swedish baron and two-time world memory champion
- Charlotte von Essen (b. 1963), Director-General of the Swedish Security Service since 2021
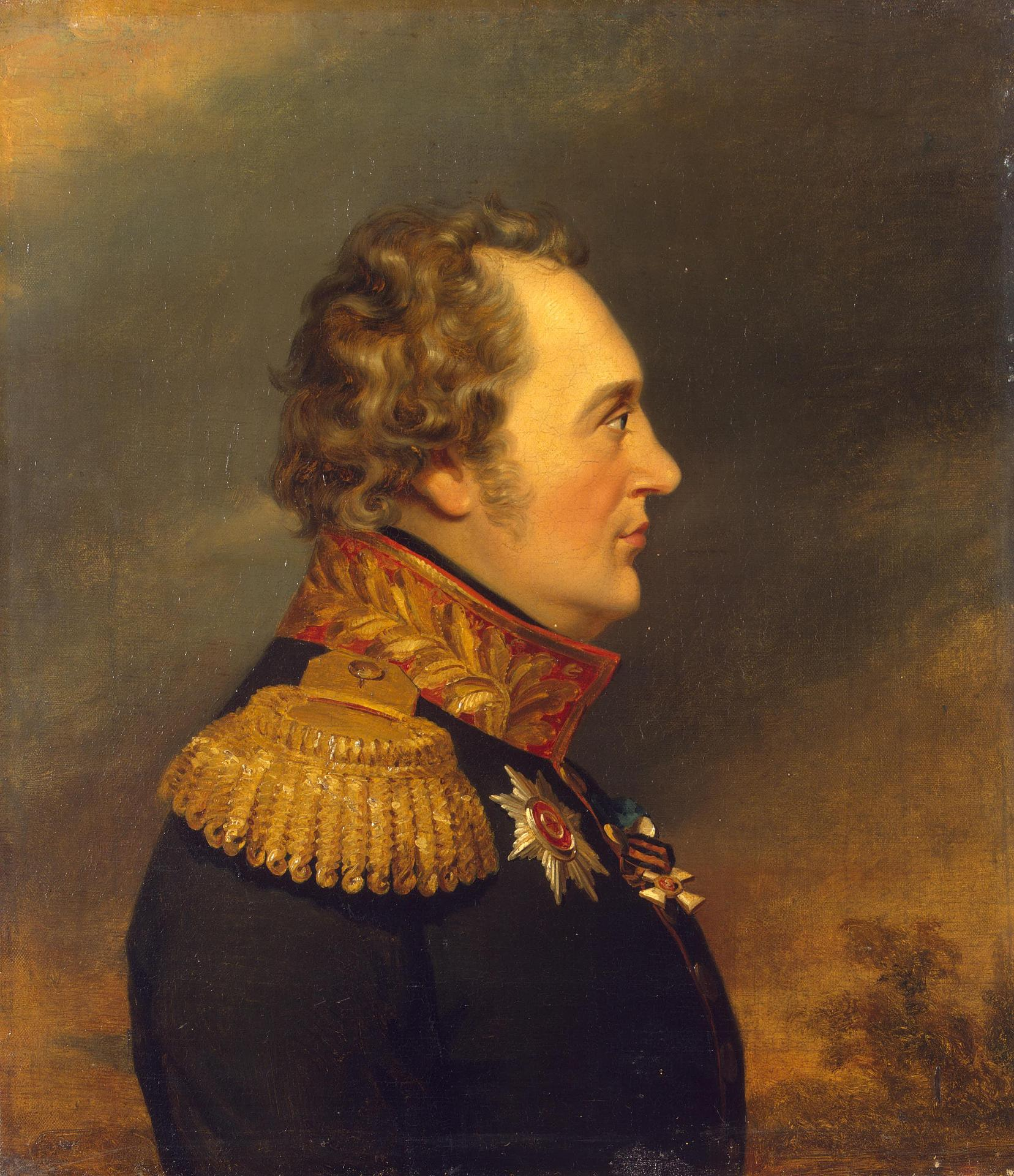
Magnus Gustav von Essen

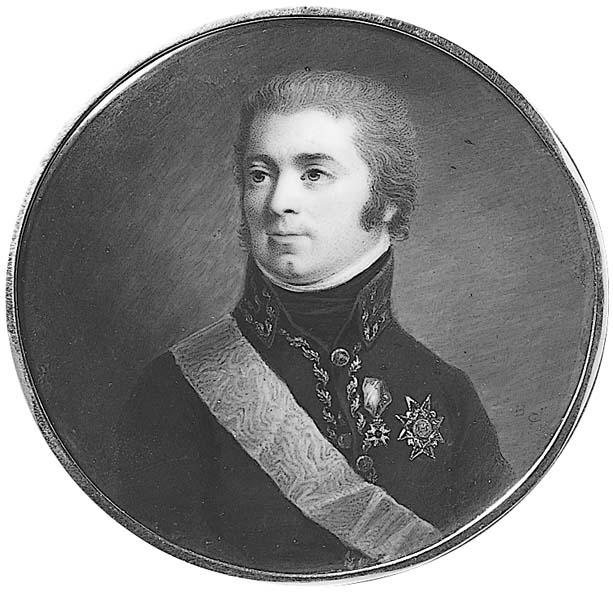
Hans Henric von Essen

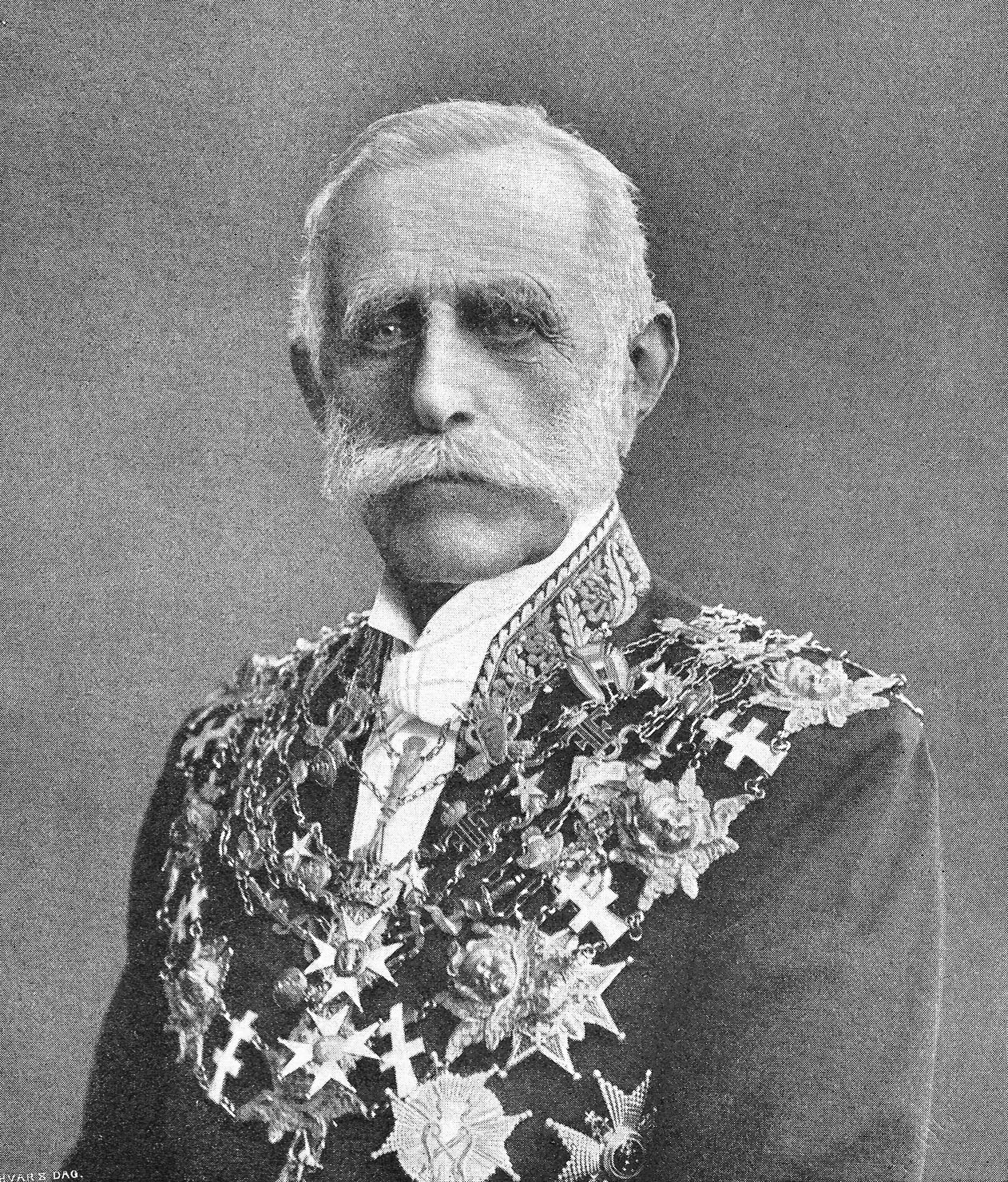
Fredrik von Essen

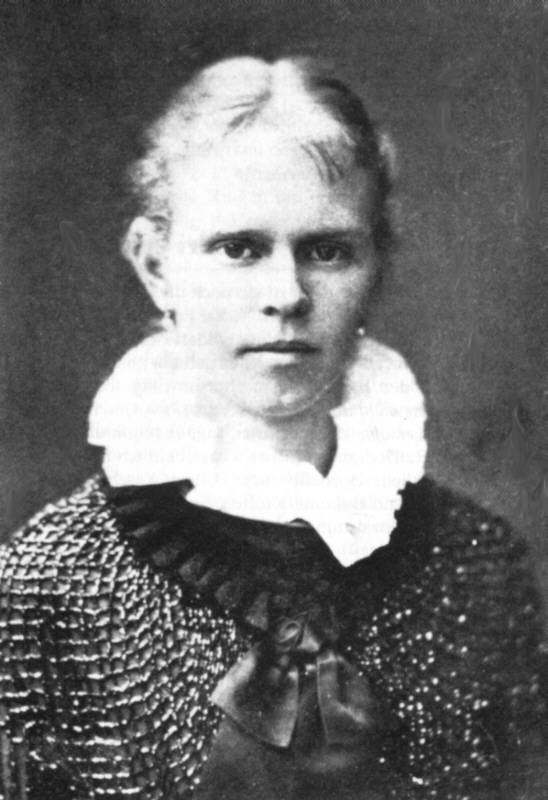
Siri von Essen

== Sources ==
This article is fully or partially based on material from Nordisk familjebok, 1904–1926.
