= Royal Netherlands Institute in Rome =

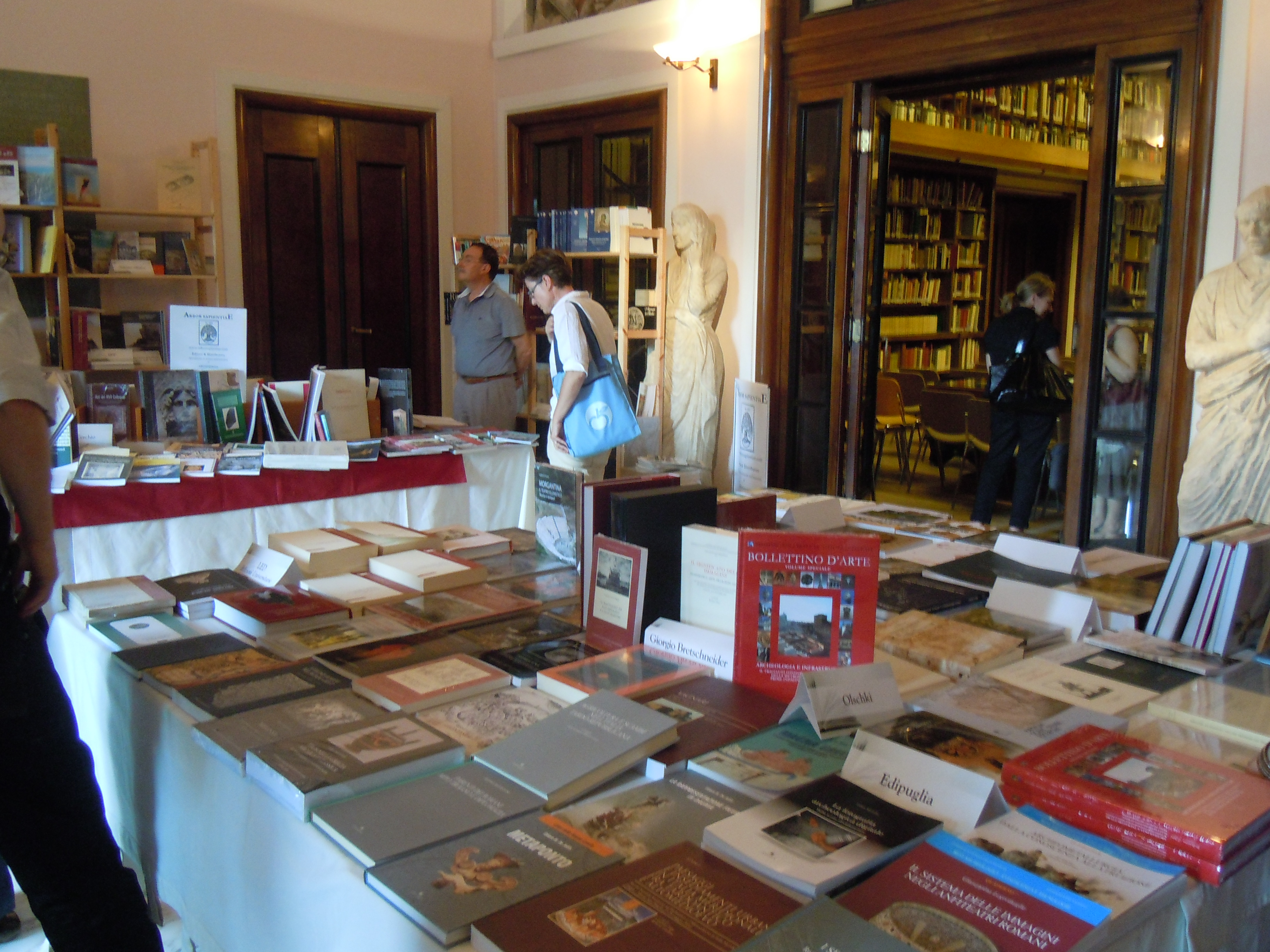
Publishers' displays during a 2012 event at the Institute

The Royal Netherlands Institute in Rome (Dutch: Koninklijk Nederlands Instituut Rome), founded in 1904 as Nederlands Historisch Instituut te Rome, is a Dutch centre for studies in the Humanities based in Rome. It was awarded the title "Royal" by Queen Beatrix in 2004. The Institute was initially one of several Roman Historical Institutes set up to identify and publish Roman archival documents of national interest, with Gisbert Brom as its first director. Its remit has since been extended to include the study of archaeology, art history, literature, architecture and geography.

== Publications ==
In 1921 the Institute launched a journal, Mededelingen van het Nederlands Historisch Instituut te Rome, with contributions often summarised or even published in full in English, German and Italian. From 2007 to 2013 the journal was published under the English title Journal of the Royal Netherlands Institute in Rome, and is currently titled Papers of the Royal Netherlands Institute in Rome.
