= List of Cold Feet episodes =

Cold Feet is a British comedy-drama television series that was written by Mike Bullen and produced by Christine Langan, Spencer Campbell and Emma Benson. The pilot episode was first broadcast on the ITV network on 30 March 1997. Critical acclaim and good ratings for a repeat broadcast led to ITV commissioning a series from production company Granada Television; 32 episodes over five series were broadcast from 15 November 1998 to 16 March 2003, the sixth series was broadcast in 2016. Episodes were typically produced for a 60-minute timeslot on the commercial ITV network. Series 5 had its runtime increased to fill a 90-minute timeslot. All episodes of the first five series have been released on VHS and DVD, and have been made available on itv.com and ITV's iTunes Store.

== Series overview ==
| Series | Episodes | Originally released | | Avg. viewers (millions) |
| Series | Episodes | First released | Last released | Avg. viewers (millions) |
|---|---|---|---|---|
| Pilot | | 30 March 1997 | | 3.50 |
| 1 | 6 | 15 November 1998 | 20 December 1998 | 7.40 |
| 2 | 6 | 26 September 1999 | 31 October 1999 | 8.54 |
| 3 | 8 | 5 November 2000 | 26 December 2000 | 9.03 |
| 4 | 8 | 18 November 2001 | 10 December 2001 | 8.50 |
| 5 | 4 | 23 February 2003 | 16 March 2003 | 9.45 |
| 6 | 8 | 5 September 2016 | 24 October 2016 | 7.66 |
| 7 | 7 | 8 September 2017 | 20 October 2017 | 5.84 |
| 8 | 6 | 14 January 2019 | 18 February 2019 | 5.59 |
| 9 | 6 | 13 January 2020 | 17 February 2020 | 4.96 |

== Episodes ==
=== Pilot (1997) ===
The pilot episode was the first episode of Granada's Comedy Premieres programming strand, made up of four television pilots that were broadcast across 1997. This episode is 52 minutes long and was produced in 1996. It introduces the six main characters and features music by The Other Two, Space and Saint Etienne. The episode was directed by Father Ted's Declan Lowney.

| No. | Title | Directed by | Written by | Original release date | Viewers (millions) |
|---|---|---|---|---|---|
| 0 | "Pilot" | Declan Lowney | Mike Bullen | 30 March 1997 | 3.5 |
Adam Williams, a serial monogamist, breaks up with his latest girlfriend and later prangs Rachel Bradley's car on a supermarket car park. He exchanges phone numbers with her, for "insurance" purposes, and the two eventually go on a series of dates. Three months later, Adam thinks he is getting too deep into a relationship, and the two split up. Rachel goes back to her old boyfriend, and Adam—aware that he "got cold feet"—wins her back by serenading her with a rose between his buttocks. Meanwhile, Adam's friends Pete and Jenny Gifford try for their first baby, and Rachel's friends Karen and David Marsden argue over whether they should get a nanny for their son, Josh.

=== Series 1 (1998) ===
The first series of six episodes was broadcast from 15 November to 20 December 1998. It was commissioned in August 1997 after the pilot won the Golden Rose of Montreux. The series was broadcast on Sunday nights in the 9.30 p.m. timeslot. The first three episodes were repeated on Saturday nights, ahead of the broadcast of Series 2. The first episode begins nine months after the end of the pilot.

| No. | Title | Directed by | Written by | Original release date | Viewers (millions) |
|---|---|---|---|---|---|
| 1 | Episode 1 | Declan Lowney | Mike Bullen | 15 November 1998 | 7.47 |
The end of Jenny's pregnancy approaches, and she becomes increasingly irritated by Pete's enthusiastic preparation for the birth, such as his route maps to the hospital and his expert knowledge of labour. Karen and David's son Josh misbehaves at nursery, leading David to blame their nanny, Ramona (Jacey Salles). Adam and Rachel discuss moving in together but fall out after an argument over whose flat to live in. They put their differences aside when Jenny goes into labour while Pete is playing golf with David. As Rachel drives to pick up Pete, Adam stays with Jenny through the birth of her son, who she and Pete name Adam.
| 2 | Episode 2 | Declan Lowney | Mike Bullen | 22 November 1998 | 7.33 |
Adam and Rachel move into their first home together but he soon moves out when he discovers that she is secretly married. He starts sleeping at Pete and Jenny's but is forcibly evicted to give them room with their new baby. He returns home and meets Kris (Lennie James), Rachel's husband, who she has invited up to Manchester to sort out their divorce. Adam puts up with Kris for a while but eventually pays him £500 to go away, asking him to promise not to tell Rachel. Kris accepts and leaves. Adam is disappointed when Rachel tells him she also paid Kris £500 to leave. Karen takes control of hers and David's finances when his investment in a South African golf course flops.
| 3 | Episode 3 | Mark Mylod | Mike Bullen | 29 November 1998 | 7.46 |
David tells Adam that he is having problems with his sex life, so Adam seeks advice for "a friend" from Pete. Pete assumes Adam's "friend" is actually Adam himself and tells Jenny that Rachel cannot satisfy Adam in bed. Rachel decides she and Adam need to spice up their relationship by disclosing their fantasies to each other—and hers is to have sex in a shop window. He gets the keys to a charity shop from a friend and they sneak in after closing time. The fantasy quickly turns into a nightmare when a ramraider drives a car through the shop window. The police arrive and Adam and Rachel are taken to the police station. Meanwhile, David decides to bypass traditional sex therapy by visiting a prostitute under an assumed name. Pete and Jenny start having sex for the first time since the birth of their baby, acting out her fantasy of a squire and his lowly servant, though his imagination is repeatedly invaded by an attractive barmaid.
| 4 | Episode 4 | Mark Mylod | Mike Bullen | 6 December 1998 | 7.44 |
Karen returns to work in publishing and is tasked with editing the new novel by renowned author Alec Welch (Denis Lawson), for whom she immediately falls. She believes that he feels the same way about her and is excited when a book tour in Liverpool means an overnight stay with him in a hotel. David learns of her plans and concludes that the only way to get back is to sleep with Ramona. Pete's parents, Algernon and Audrey (Sam Kelly and Doreen Keogh) visit him and Jenny, testing Pete's already fraying relationship with his father. In the wake of meeting Welch at the Marsdens' dinner party, Adam decides to start work on a novel about a man's fraying relationship with his father.
| 5 | Episode 5 | Nigel Cole | Mike Bullen | 13 December 1998 | 7.91 |
Following David's attempt to sleep with Ramona and Karen's attraction to Welch, the couple seek marriage guidance counselling. After David causes a scene in her office, the therapist suggests Karen and David go on a "first date" with each other to try to rediscover their attraction to each other. Jenny looks for something apart from the baby to talk to Pete about. Adam seeks to prove to Rachel that he is not a "sad old man" after she finds out he is attracted to their neighbour (Anna Madeley) by organising a lad's night out. Rachel, Karen and Jenny go to a divorce party hosted by a friend of Karen's, while Adam and Pete try to buy some E at a club.
| 6 | Episode 6 | Nigel Cole | Mike Bullen | 20 December 1998 | 6.77 |
David invites the other couples to a charity ball he and Karen are attending, where Jenny lets off a fire extinguisher over Natalie (Lorelei King), David's boss. Natalie demands compensation and a written apology from Jenny, putting David in a difficult position. Rachel tells Karen that she is pregnant but does not know whether the father is Adam or Kris, whom she slept with when he was staying in Manchester. Adam proposes to Rachel, thinking he is the father, and is distraught when he learns he may not be. Rachel decides to move to London until the baby is born, and Adam follows her to the station, imagining a Brief Encounter-esque reconciliation. He tells her that he does not care who the father is. Rachel proves that he does care and leaves anyway.

=== Series 2 (1999) ===
A second series of six episodes was commissioned by ITV before the first had concluded broadcast. This series' episodes played up the non-linear structure of the first series episodes, using more flashbacks and fantasy scenes. It was first broadcast from 26 September to 31 October 1999. Executive producer Andy Harries had the series moved to the 9 p.m. timeslot, annoying advertisers. The first episode begins nine months after the end of the first series.

| No. | Title | Directed by | Written by | Original release date | Viewers (millions) |
|---|---|---|---|---|---|
| 7 | Episode 1 | Tom Hooper | Mike Bullen | 26 September 1999 | 8.08 |
Pete and Jenny set Adam up with Amy (Rosie Cavaliero), one of Pete's co-workers. Rachel arrives unexpectedly at Karen and David's house, and Pete later sees her with someone else's baby at the supermarket. Convinced that it is his baby, Adam invites Rachel around his house, where she tells him she had an abortion. David is made redundant and decides to become a full-time house husband after Josh is nearly hit by a car. Jenny tells Pete that she thinks she no longer loves him.
| 8 | Episode 2 | Tom Hooper | Mike Bullen | 3 October 1999 | 7.95 |
Pete reads Jenny's diary to see if there is another man in her life. He reads that she kissed Adam, and punches his friend at work. The two later sort out their differences. Adam is still trying to dump the clingy Amy, but invites one of her attractive colleagues, Rachel (2) (Rachel Fielding), to be his lodger. Rachel tries to make amends with Adam but his horrified when she finds him, Rachel 2 and Amy, half-naked in his hallway. Natalie offers David a new job.
| 9 | Episode 3 | Tom Vaughan | Mike Bullen | 10 October 1999 | 7.96 |
Rachel returns to her old advertising job and is asked on a date by Danny (Hugh Dancy), a younger co-worker. Rachel 2 moves out of Adam's, so Jenny sets him up with a woman, Callie (Natalie Roles), from a lonely hearts column. On a team-building weekend, Pete and Amy book into a motel, where they sleep together. Karen and David go to Paris for their anniversary, and Adam is humiliated on his blind date when he is seated with Rachel and Danny.
| 10 | Episode 4 | Tom Vaughan | Mike Bullen | 17 October 1999 | 8.64 |
A boring dinner party leads Karen to re-evaluate her lifestyle; she gives her expensive clothes to charity and gets herself a tattoo. Adam, Pete and Jenny get invited to their school reunion. Rachel breaks up with Danny, and, after agreeing to be friends with Adam, goes to his reunion as his pretend date. Pete tells Adam about his affair with Amy, and Adam—thinking they can share secrets—tells Karen, who then tells Jenny.
| 11 | Episode 5 | Pete Travis | Mike Bullen | 24 October 1999 | 9.14 |
Adam is devastated when he is diagnosed with testicular cancer and a probable malignant tumour. Jenny throws Pete out of the house following his infidelity, telling him to take all of his things with him. Unable to cope with their petty fighting, Adam blurts out that he has cancer, shocking the couple. David's younger brother, Nick (Stephen Moyer), arrives at the Marsdens' house and takes a liking to Rachel. After his surgery, Adam and Rachel get back together, and Pete and Jenny give their marriage another try.
| 12 | Episode 6 | Pete Travis | Mike Bullen | 31 October 1999 | 9.48 |
David arranges a trip for the couples to Lindisfarne, where they can see in the new millennium together. Pete and Jenny's relationship is frosty but Adam and Rachel make up for lost time in the bedroom. After Adam and Pete temporarily get stranded in their boat while coming back from the mainland, the Giffords' relationship gets worse. Karen tells David she is pregnant. After Ramona removes the batteries from Pete's "Millennium clock", the couples see in the year 2000 on the beach.

=== Series 3 (2000) ===
The third series was extended from six to eight episodes on the success of the first two series. ITV had asked Granada for up to 20 episodes, but were refused on the basis that it would turn the show into a soap opera. The episodes suffered from ITV's decision to insert a third commercial break into evening programming; like many other series that had already completed post-production, Cold Feet's editors were forced to alter their episodes to allow for the extra breaks. The first two episodes were broadcast as a single two-hour episode on 12 November. Episode 8, featuring Adam and Rachel's wedding, was broadcast on Boxing Day—the first time the show aired on a Tuesday. During pre-production, Mike Bullen declined to write the episodes, believing that all the stories that could be told had been told. His interest was eventually renewed and he wrote four episodes, leaving the other four to David Nicholls. For Episode 5, the cast and crew spent several days filming in Portrush and Belfast in Northern Ireland. The series was first broadcast from 5 November to 26 December 2000.

| No. | Title | Directed by | Written by | Original release date | Viewers (millions) |
|---|---|---|---|---|---|
| 13 | Episode 1 | Simon Delaney | Mike Bullen | 12 November 2000 | 8.33 |
Pete and Jenny have separated, so he has been living at Adam and Rachel's. He moves back in with Jenny as her lodger when Adam and Rachel tire of his uncleanliness. As Karen and David return home with their new baby twins, Ellie and Olivia, Heather, Karen's ex-pat mother, arrives from Spain. At a dinner party, she takes a liking to Felix, one of David's clients. Jenny has also been invited, and is smitten with Robert, another client. Pete prepares breakfast for Jenny on their anniversary but is saddened when she receives flowers from Robert. Rachel tells Adam that her period is late.
| 14 | Episode 2 | Simon Delaney | David Nicholls | 12 November 2000 | 8.33 |
Pete starts searching for a place of his own as Jenny and Robert start going on dates. He eventually finds a house-share with Matthew, a middle-aged divorced man who he is later shocked to discover is gay. Rachel's pregnancy turns out to be a false alarm. A visit to the doctor informs them that Rachel's inability to conceive might be related to her abortion. Jessica, a local political activist, arrives on the Marsdens' doorstep. David attends a local residents' meeting and becomes attracted to Jessica.
| 15 | Episode 3 | Simon Delaney | David Nicholls | 19 November 2000 | 9.87 |
Pete and Ramona start seeing each other after an encounter in the park, and Jenny has to deal with her friends' reluctance to get to know Robert. Adam and Rachel attend their first appointment for Rachel's intracytoplasmic sperm injection. Heather smacks Josh but makes up with Karen and later returns to Spain. David organises his own 40th birthday party and decides to make it fancy-dress. At the party, he kisses Jessica, and Jenny becomes jealous when she sees Pete and Ramona dance. The next morning, David is surprised to find a Harley-Davidson motorbike in the kitchen.
| 16 | Episode 4 | Jon Jones | Mike Bullen | 26 November 2000 | 8.60 |
Pete and Ramona spend more time with each other, and she watches him play on Matthew's all-gay football team. Karen meets up with her old college friend, photographer Miles Brodie, as David spends more and more time with Jessica. The cost of Adam and Rachel's ICSI treatment begins to mount. Results from a scan come back, and it is revealed that Rachel is suffering from "partial Asherman's syndrome" resulting from her abortion. Later, he proposes to her.
| 17 | Episode 5 | Jon Jones | Mike Bullen | 3 December 2000 | 9.14 |
Adam and Rachel's friends show public support when they announce their engagement, but secretly believe they are doing it for the wrong reasons. Karen becomes jealous of Jenny when she takes charge of planning Brodie's photography exhibition. David and Jessica book into a hotel for a dirty afternoon, and Pete begins chatting with "Girlpower", a woman on an Internet chatroom. She asks to meet him at the school where she works, where it turns out he was set up by two schoolgirls. However, he does get a date with their teacher, Emma. After abandoning the idea of a long engagement, Adam and Rachel decide to get married as soon as possible.
| 18 | Episode 6 | Jon Jones | David Nicholls | 10 December 2000 | 9.24 |
Pete and David take Adam on a stag weekend to Belfast and Portrush, where he grew up. At a surprise party, he is reunited with his old girlfriend, Jane Fitzpatrick (Victoria Smurfit), and later drunkenly falls asleep in her bed. Pete discovers David's affair with Jessica, and makes him promise to break up with her when they get home. Meanwhile, Rachel has taken Karen and Jenny to a health spa. Jenny lets slip that she once kissed Adam and Rachel is furious. They make up and decide to meet up with their partners in Northern Ireland. Rachel tells Adam that she knows about him and Jenny and he does not tell her that he kissed Jane the night before.
| 19 | Episode 7 | Tim Whitby | David Nicholls | 17 December 2000 | 9.09 |
Jenny takes charge of planning Adam and Rachel's wedding as Adam buys Rachel an unattractive engagement ring. David unceremoniously breaks up with Jessica in a restaurant, where they are seen by Robert. After Karen is arrested for tackling a car thief, David takes her out to dinner, where she begins to suspect something is wrong. An argument over the engagement ring leads Adam and Rachel to scale back their wedding plans; they opt for a simple register office ceremony instead of at a large country house. Pete, enjoying his dates with Emma, asks Jenny for a divorce.
| 20 | Episode 8 | Tim Whitby | Mike Bullen | 26 December 2000 | 9.66 |
On the morning of the wedding, Pete wonders if divorcing Jenny is the right thing to do. As Robert is moving his things out of Jenny's house, he tells her that David is having an affair. She tells Rachel and they both wonder whether to tell Karen. Adam arrives late to the registry office after Pete forgets to arrange for a car. The reception is held at Karen and David's. David realises that everyone except Karen knows about the affair, and tells her himself. He offers to leave but she decides that they should stay together for the kids. The episode ends with the couples watching Adam and Rachel's wedding video, filmed by Pete. Though David and Karen's marriage appears to be over, Pete and Jenny are back together.

=== Series 4 (2001) ===
The storyline for the fourth series was conceived by Mike Bullen and Andy Harries while they were on a speaking tour of Australia; Bullen wanted to set an episode in Sydney because it was "a nice place to go". Fay Ripley left the series in Episode 2, so a replacement cast member, Kimberley Joseph as Jo Ellison, was introduced in Episode 1. Over the series, Pete and Jo fall in love and get married in Sydney in Episode 8. The episode was filmed on location in Sydney in October 2001. Bullen wrote it as a normal episode of Cold Feet that just happened to be set in Australia. This episode was extended to fill a 90-minute timeslot.

| No. | Title | Directed by | Written by | Original release date | Viewers (millions) |
|---|---|---|---|---|---|
| 21 | Episode 1 | Tim Whitby | Mike Bullen | 18 November 2001 | 9.24 |
When Rachel takes up amateur dramatics, Adam becomes jealous but is offered a small part in the play by the director after an angry outburst. At the same time he coaches Josh's football team, after David's sensitive touch has caused a stream of losses for it. Karen and David remain on amicable terms, for the sake of the children, following his affair with Jessica. Frustrated that she will not forgive him, he takes advice from Adam to become the man she has wanted; soon he is quoting Keats at breakfast and watching Spanish films, though only Ramona notices. Jenny and Pete's marriage has changed direction; he has moved back in with the family and she is pregnant and working for a large hotel chain. After a fact-finding trip to Rome the owner of the company offers Jenny a position as his personal assistant in New York. She declines the offer, but her mood changes when her doctor informs her that she has miscarried. Adam and Rachel decide to adopt, while Karen befriends Rachel's colleague Jo.
| 22 | Episode 2 | Tim Whitby | Mike Bullen | 19 November 2001 | 6.96 |
Karen's drinking gets worse as she and David fight constantly, so he seeks counselling. Ramona is in demand; the owner of a strip club offers her a job and a nanny position has become available at a neighbour's house. Karen and Jo babysit Little Adam while Jenny tells Pete over dinner that she is taking Owen's PA job after all. Karen leaves early when David does not get home on time and Jenny is infuriated when she finds Jo, a drunken stranger to her, babysitting her child. Ramona hands in her notice, fed up with Karen, but when David sees her working in the strip club, he tells her not to work her notice. Adam and Rachel go to an adoption meeting, where Adam puts his foot in his mouth. Later he sees Jane in town and is horrified when Rachel invites her round for dinner. His ex reveals she followed him to Manchester because she is still in love with him. David's therapy leads him to offer Ramona her job back, but his optimism is ruined when Karen tells him to move out. Jenny leaves for New York with Little Adam.
| 23 | Episode 3 | Tim Whitby | Mike Bullen | 25 November 2001 | 8.96 |
David has moved in with Pete after being thrown out of his house. Karen has a girls' night in with an old friend called Bella, and Ramona, Rachel, Jo and Jane. She drinks heavily and insults Bella, while Jane comes close to revealing her the relationship she had with Adam. Rachel is still unaware the following morning when she almost catches Jane, whom she invited to stay the night, groping Adam in the kitchen. Karen takes Pete out on a night of drinking, but leaves him in a bar to go clubbing with the bar owner. Adam decides to tell Jane to leave, but accidentally reveals his relationship to his wife when he finds the two talking. After a violin recital at Josh's school, Karen nearly crashes the car. David berates her for her recklessness and she joins him at his therapy in an effort to get her drinking under control.
| 24 | Episode 4 | Paul Kousoulides | Mike Bullen and Mark Chappell | 26 November 2001 | 7.21 |
After the revelation of Adam and Jane's near-affair, Rachel refuses to speak to him, cutting up bunches of flowers he has sent to her by way of apology. David steps in, reminding her that Adam forgave her after she slept with her ex-husband Kris, and that nothing even happened between Adam and Jane. After making up, the two are introduced to Laura, a potential adoptee, and the three bond. Pete's mother Audrey arrives at his house and immediately begins cleaning and cooking for him and David. Jo walks out of her job when she doesn't get a promotion. Pete and David arrive home one evening to find Audrey sitting in a smouldering kitchen. She reveals her memory has slowly been going, and he decides that she should move in with him. After both reconsider, she moves into sheltered housing, taking with her a dog Pete got for company. Josh's standards begin slipping at school, so Karen and David agree that David should come home for his sake. When Rachel begins feeling ill, a visit to the doctor reveals she is pregnant.
| 25 | Episode 5 | Paul Kousoulides | Mike Bullen | 2 December 2001 | 9.79 |
As David moves out of Pete's Jo moves in; after quitting her job she cannot pay rent and her landlord has evicted her. Adam and Rachel show Laura her bedroom and later tell the adoption agent of Rachel's pregnancy. This does not sit well with her and she tells them the adoption cannot go ahead as it is not in Laura's best interests to live with them, devastating them. David and Karen attend a party, where she meets Mark Cubitt (Sean Pertwee), a publisher who asks her to edit a book his wife, Geraldine, is writing. Pete, David and Adam join Jo's aerobics class and Pete and David later go running with her. Pete slowly falls in love with her, but is alarmed when she starts seeing someone, Suggs (Paterson Joseph) from his work. Rachel and Adam see a solicitor about contesting the adoption agency decision, but are resigned to the fact they have to let Laura go.
| 26 | Episode 6 | Paul Kousoulides | Mike Bullen | 3 December 2001 | 8.03 |
While Rachel visits Jenny in New York, Adam organises a poker night. Everyone leaves but he is still eager to gamble, so he and Ramona visit a casino. Pete buys an MG, which Adam borrows without telling him. On his fantasy joyride he hooks up with an attractive woman and they go back to her place. Pete has reported the car stolen but finds it and drives it home. He winds up being stopped after Adam also reports it stolen. Mark gives Karen a necklace and offers her a permanent job with him, which she refuses. David buys Karen a racehorse for her birthday without realising the cost of upkeep. After trying to offload it on his company he puts it in at Chester, but it loses the race. Jo asks Pete out on a date after she dumps Suggs.
| 27 | Episode 7 | Ciaran Donnelly | Mike Bullen | 9 December 2001 | 8.83 |
Rachel returns, ready for sex, but is worried Adam no longer finds her attractive because of her size. Karen meets Mark at a hotel where he has booked a room. She tells Rachel of her feelings for him and she tells her to do what she has to. At the book launch, Geraldine tells Karen that Mark has had many affairs before this one, though Mark later tells her he will leave Geraldine to be with her. Pete avoids sex with Jo, worried that she will not find him attractive naked. David's boss Natalie tasks him with making a list of redundancies. Hard pressed to come up with a good list, he puts everyone's name down, including his own, but accidentally emails it to the rest of the office. When the head of the company sees it, he fires Natalie and promotes David. When Jo's visa expires, she decides to go back to Australia, thinking he does not like her. He follows her and she proposes to him.
| 28 | Episode 8 | Ciaran Donnelly | Mike Bullen | 10 December 2001 | 8.95 |
The group flies to Sydney for Pete and Jo's wedding. David books a hotel room with a view of the harbour in an effort to make a new start with Karen. Impressed by this, she emails Mark to tell him that the affair is over. Rachel meets with her sister Lucy (Susannah Doyle), who tells her she is screening men to father a child with, despite being a lesbian. Adam volunteers his banked sperm but Rachel talks him out of it. Pete meets Jo's rich father, Rod Ellison (Gary Sweet), who tries to pay him off after thinking he is marrying Jo only for the money. Pete flatly refuses. Mark arrives in Sydney, telling Karen he has left Geraldine to be with her. When David tells Karen that he wants the family to move to Australia, Mark reveals the affair, leading to a fight between the two. Adam changes Rod's mind about Pete and the couple prepares to marry. Rachel goes into premature labour and is given a caesarean section at the hospital. At the wedding, Pete is without a best man and the rings, so David and Karen offer theirs. Karen tries to talk to David after the ceremony, but he refuses and flies back to England alone.

=== Series 5 (2003) ===
At the conclusion of the third series, Bullen announced that he did not want to write a fifth series, and that the fourth would be the last. Series 4, Episode 8 was produced as the final episode but the cast and crew realised that they would like to make one final series for proper closure. Bullen agreed to write the final episodes on the condition that there would be just four, and that he could kill off a character. Matt Greenhalgh co-wrote Episode 3 with Bullen, specifically the scenes depicting Rachel's death. Fay Ripley returned as Jenny for the final episode. As her pregnancy was nearly complete, Episode 4 was filmed before Episode 3 to accommodate her schedule. A retrospective documentary entitled Cold Feet: The Final Call was broadcast on 11 March, between the broadcasts of Episode 3 and Episode 4, gaining 4.8 million viewers. Episode 1 begins three months after the end of the fourth series. The DVD release of Series 5 has the four episodes reformatted into six episodes of approximately 50 minutes each.

| No. | Title | Directed by | Written by | Original release date | Viewers (millions) |
|---|---|---|---|---|---|
| 29 | Episode 1 | Ciaran Donnelly | Mike Bullen | 23 February 2003 | 8.78 |
Three months after their wedding, Pete and Jo return to Manchester from Australia and immediately find Pete's mum, Audrey, living with them after she is evicted from her sheltered housing. Audrey's arthritis keeps her, and consequently Pete and Jo, awake so Jo suggests marijuana as a way of easing her joints. They obtain some from a local dealer and Audrey moves into new accommodation at the end of the episode. Karen and David are living separately and trying to get an amicable divorce. Karen meets Mark (Sean Pertwee), the man she had an affair with, for the first time since the Sydney trip, who suggests she gets a better financial settlement from David. David hires a new solicitor, Robyn Duff (Lucy Robinson), who suggests using Karen's alcoholism as grounds for a custody battle. Adam feels sidelined as Rachel spends every waking hour with baby Matthew, and he walks out of his son's naming ceremony, saying he does not love him. Rachel reveals her obsessive coddling of the child is because she once dropped him on the floor. Ramona (Jacey Sallés) falls for swimming instructor Lee (Richard Armitage) at a health club.
| 30 | Episode 2 | Ciaran Donnelly | Mike Bullen | 2 March 2003 | 8.47 |
Pete and Jo are investigated by immigration officials, who have suspicions that their marriage is staged so Jo can get a visa. Pete begins to doubt her love for him when he discovers an email in which she says she would "Do anything to stay in the country". Pete's trust in Jo is shattered, and the marriage begins to collapse. As Rachel's maternity leave draws to a close and she returns to work, Adam is made redundant. He takes Matthew to a parent and child group and fails to keep up with a singalong but eventually secures a new job while Rachel is away. Karen and David's divorce proceedings escalate as Robyn pressures David to seek custody of the children. The two later spend the night together while Karen encourages Mark to bond with the children for the sake of their resumed relationship. After an incident leaves Josh in tears, Mark tells Karen he can love only her, not her children, and leaves. Karen and David resume their amicable divorce, while Ramona and Lee spend the night together.
| 31 | Episode 3 | Simon Delaney | Mike Bullen and Matt Greenhalgh | 9 March 2003 | 9.81 |
Adam and Rachel learn that their rented house is to be auctioned and they begin to look for a new place to live. Adam's estranged father, Bill (Ian McElhinney), arrives but Adam wants nothing to do with him. Bill tells Adam that his mother stopped the contact between them after he had an affair with a man and Adam reluctantly tries to bond with him. Jo and Pete slowly mend their marriage but, on a trip away, she sleeps with Lee, who has asked Ramona to move in with him. Feeling guilty, Jo confesses the affair to Karen. David avoids Robyn's calls after their personal feelings affected the divorce petition but when they make up, he decides to introduce her to his friends. Adam finds a house, though Rachel is not so keen on it. Bill later offers to make up the difference so they can afford their current place, and Adam goes to the auction. He wins the bidding and phones Rachel to tell her the good news. Seconds after she hangs up, her car is hit by a truck. Her friends gather at her hospital bedside where, despite Adam's optimism that she will recover, she dies from her injuries.
| 32 | Episode 4 | Tim Sullivan | Mike Bullen | 16 March 2003 | 10.72 |
Adam sees Rachel everywhere as he and his friends gather for her funeral. Pete's ex-wife Jenny (Fay Ripley) arrives at the crematorium, heavily-pregnant. As she has nowhere to stay, Jo invites her to hers and Pete's house. Adam shows no apparent signs of grief as he returns to work almost immediately. Concerned, his friends visit him, but he rejects their help until he sees Matthew crawling; what he has lost overwhelms him and he goes to see Karen. Pete and Jenny grow closer as he bonds with his son. Lee asks Ramona to marry him, causing Karen to reveal his affair with Jo and leaving both Ramona and Pete furious with their partners. The group travels to Portmeirion to scatter Rachel's ashes. When they get back to Manchester, Pete tells Jo he wants a divorce and she decides to go back to Australia. Jenny moves back in with Pete, suggesting he pretend to be the father of her unborn child. David resumes his relationship with Robyn, and Karen and Ramona plan a break in Spain. Adam packs his belongings and phones his father, leaving Manchester with Matthew.

=== Series 6 (2016) ===
| No. | Title | Directed by | Written by | Original release date | Viewers (millions) |
|---|---|---|---|---|---|
| 33 | Episode 1 | Terry McDonough | Mike Bullen | 5 September 2016 | 9.13 |
Adam returns from Singapore with the news he is to marry again, to Angela, the daughter of a millionaire business tycoon. Matthew shows opposition to the marriage, but is later revealed as a response to his forthcoming expulsion from school after being found in possession of drugs. Adam's friends believe that his decision to marry Angela so quickly after meeting is in a desperate attempt to hold onto happiness after Rachel, and a close encounter from the grave makes him contemplative. David speaks candidly to Robyn about the lack of romance between them, compelling him to turn to Karen as a last resort. Pete and Jenny's marriage buckles under the strain of their financial problems, with Pete seemingly in the throes of a mid-life crisis, combined with a monotonous job as a taxi driver and his frustrating work as a carer for pensioner Harry (James Bolam). Karen intervenes with Adam and Matthew's relationship, coming at an inconvenient time for Adam, who brings the wedding forward.
| 34 | Episode 2 | Terry McDonough | Mike Bullen | 12 September 2016 | 7.74 |
Adam has second thoughts following Karen's pre-ceremony words about Matthew. David is eager to sign Angela's father Eddie (Art Malik) as a client to his firm, and coerces Karen to join him at a business event; Robyn's discovery of this creates an even larger rift between her and David. David organises a corporate box at a Manchester United match at Old Trafford for Eddie, and invites Harry, Adam, Pete and their sons, but leaves them with void tickets. Adam's attempt to bond with Matthew over football fails after ignoring how his son's interests have changed over his lengthy absence. His curiosity over Matthew's sexuality is later quelled when Karen reveals she walked in on him with her daughter Ellie. Adam is disconcerted at Pete's uncharacteristic behaviour. Jenny battles her faltering relationship with Pete, with her attempts to reignite their love life proving fruitless. Her intrigue for a mysterious client evaporates after she realises that Pete is suffering from depression.
| 35 | Episode 3 | Juliet May | Mike Bullen | 19 September 2016 | 7.77 |
Everyone rallies around Pete following his depression diagnosis. David, whose suspension from work following a wrongful arrest for fraud leaves him with nothing to do, encourages Pete and Adam to go cycling in an attempt to lift Pete's spirits. Jenny is perturbed by her admirer's unremitting attempts to contact her, and enlists Adam's help to rid herself of him, questioning her fracturing relationship with Pete in the process. Karen's relationship with Eddie flourishes, yet she remains hesitant despite encouragement from Ellie. Angela struggles to act as a mother to Matthew, and finds it difficult to part herself from her life in Singapore much longer, where the promise of a promotion is too tantalising to give up.
| 36 | Episode 4 | Juliet May | Mike Bullen | 26 September 2016 | 7.34 |
News of Harry's passing pushes Pete into a dejective state. Jenny's sister is determined to make things difficult for her in regards to caring for their supposedly indisposed mother. David finds himself even more isolated when a ruthless Robyn decides she wants a divorce. His fraud accusation and separation from Robyn lead him to call on the pity of Karen and his daughters, but finds out he doesn't like playing second fiddle to Karen and Eddie. Adam and Angela's temporary solution for a long-distance relationship begins to show cracks, and after incorrectly assuming she has cheated, Adam turns to Tina, who lives across from him. After she rejects him, Angela returns in a last attempt to reconcile and convince Adam to join her in Singapore. Adam has a realisation about his relationship with Matthew.
| 37 | Episode 5 | Jamie Jay Johnson | Amy Roberts & Loren McLaughlan | 3 October 2016 | 7.28 |
The alleged nature of the claims David misappropriated client funds becomes an indictment, and soon meddles in Karen's finances. Karen becomes dissatisfied with her job and considers a redundancy offer, and starts considering self-publishing, something Eddie throws cold water on. Both Pete and Tina take note of Adam's wallowing, and suggest he spends time with Matthew, but his attempts to bond over music end with a riposte from Matthew. Jenny is paid an unwelcome visit by former partner Grant (Robert Webb), whom it transpires is Chloe's biological father. Jen and Pete disagree on whether to tell Chloe, while they contemplate over the news Harry's children are contesting his will, which left Pete with a large sum. Grant reveals the truth to Chloe against Pete and Jenny's will.
| 38 | Episode 6 | Jamie Jay Johnson | Mike Bullen & John Forte | 10 October 2016 | 7.17 |
Chloe refuses to recognise Pete as her father. Coupled with Jenny's insistence that he fight for the money Harry left him in his will, Pete struggles to cope. Grant changes his mind about wanting a relationship with Chloe and leaves Manchester. David acclimatises to prison life, forming a profound connection with a cellmate. Tina helps Adam and Matthew's search for a permanent home. Karen's decision to become freelance reaps rewards, which include being wooed by an enthusiastic potential investor and main shareholder in her company. Her increasing distance from Eddie forces her into a relationship decision. As all converge on the local pub to encourage young Adam's band's performance, Pete's position as a role model is reignited and Tina's growing fondness for Adam is acted upon.
| 39 | Episode 7 | Terry McDonough | Loren McLoughan, Amy Roberts and Mike Bullen | 17 October 2016 | 7.40 |
Adam dwells on Tina's kiss, and is approached by a woman who claims her husband, unbeknown to her Tina's lover, Jamie, is cheating on her. Tina is forced to choose between Jamie and bemused Adam. David, who is struggling in the midst of worrying about the cost of his legal matters and Robyn's divorce terms, empties his daughters' university fund to help pay for his defence. As a result of this, he ends up on Pete and Jenny's doorstep. He forms a plan to blackmail his boss into providing help in the case for his innocence. Pete and Tricia come to an amicable agreement regarding the money bequeathed by Harry. Pete wants to use the money primarily for mortgage repayments, but Jenny feels the family needs a holiday. Meanwhile, Karen and Jenny's attempts at collaborating on the former's new business marketing end in a joint agreement never to enter into any work relationship together. Tina's lover turns up on her doorstep and serenades her. Tina and Adam's relationship comes to a head.
| 40 | Episode 8 | Terry McDonough | Mike Bullen | 24 October 2016 | 7.42 |
Pete lets slip about Adam’s surprise party, which marks his 49th birthday. The celebrations put up by Tina incorrectly have his age a year older. Adam retains his fixation on Tina, and dejectedly decides to go to an off-license with Pete, but the two are caught up in an attempted robbery. During the hold-up, Pete opens up to Adam, and reveals to his intention to kill himself. Adam does his best to reason with the robber before they both manage to leave the off-licence unscathed. Back at the party, Jenny and Karen are thrilled when they receive news from David that the charges against him are being dropped. David hits the booze in celebration, and he reveals to Karen his desire to get back together with her. He clashes with Eddie, who also hopes to resume his relationship with Karen. Karen and David’s son, Josh, arrives unexpectedly at Adam’s party, alongside Ramona, with a new boyfriend, Juan, whom Karen, Jenny and Adam hypothesise is gay. Karen stumbles upon Juan with Josh in the bathroom, before Karen frankly admits to Josh she’s been aware of his sexuality for years. Josh proclaims his wish for her to make David aware, but is cautious of his reaction. Matthew reveals Ellie’s wish to return to a relationship with him despite his desire to begin a relationship with her sister, Olivia. Adam and Tina’s relationship becomes the ultimate focus of the party and such attention encourages the two to start a relationship.

=== Series 7 (2017) ===
| No. | Title | Directed by | Written by | Original release date | Viewers (millions) |
|---|---|---|---|---|---|
| 41 | Episode 1 | Terry McDonough | Mike Bullen | 8 September 2017 | 6.46 |
Karen celebrates the success of her first client, novelist Bridie Sellers, at a launch party – unlike David, who, after the scandal, is reduced to selling life insurance to old ladies. Pete, however, offers him an escape route, as financial advisor to wealthy Nikki Kirkbright, though his first day could have gone better. Adam secures IT work with charismatic American CEO Sarah Poynter and moves back into his old house with Matthew and David as his lodger. After initial hesitation Tina also joins them whilst Jenny fears the sack for whistle-blowing but is promoted instead.
| 42 | Episode 2 | Terry McDonough | Mike Bullen | 15 September 2017 | 5.61 |
After a successful house-warming Adam suggests to Tina that they have a baby but she is unsure and he allows his friends to dissuade him so he is confused when she accuses him of making decisions without her. He is also shocked to learn that Tina had an affair with Sarah's husband, whilst Matthew also springs another, unwelcome, surprise. Jenny starts to regret her promotion when she has to fire the disabled Tracey whilst Karen is troubled when nosey accountant Benjamin Stevens discovers that her sole client, Bridie, is unable to write a second book and is hitting the bottle. Pete starts work at a retirement home whilst David meets the married Nikki in secret before being taken for a ride.
| 43 | Episode 3 | Louise Hooper | Mike Bullen & James Wood | 22 September 2017 | 5.67 |
David is confronted by Nikki's wealthy, uncouth husband George but, having concealed the fact that Nikki wants a divorce, is given a job as George's financial advisor. Karen, already feeling harassed by Stevens, is angry with Adam and Matthew when she discovers Matthew has impregnated her daughter Olivia whilst David is annoyed to hear the news from ex-wife Robyn. There is, however, ultimate reconciliation between the two families when the youngsters decide on a termination. Meanwhile Jenny, still mad with Pete for employing Tracey at the retirement home, is further displeased when her sister Sheila jets off to Canada to meet her Internet date, leading Pete to suggest her elderly mother Barbara moves in with them.
| 44 | Episode 4 | Louise Hooper | Mike Bullen & James Wood | 29 September 2017 | 5.95 |
Adam is horrified to see that a sex tape Tina made with Sarah's husband Jamie three years earlier is doing the rounds on the net and reacts by punching Jamie. Tina is not impressed, undermining Adam's performance in bed and seeming to join with Jamie in being unashamed. David starts work for George Kirkbright but is perturbed by his violent nature whilst also trying to find ways in which Karen can prevent Stevens from buying her out. None come to fruition but when Karen considers remortgaging her house David steps in to provide damage limitation. Jenny and Pete have their own problems with Barbara's apparent absent-mindedness – until resentful daughter Chloe comes clean.
| 45 | Episode 5 | Terry McDonough | Mike Bullen | 6 October 2017 | 5.50 |
The atmosphere between Tina and himself still frosty Adam goes on a team building exercise, aware that Sarah will also be there. Inevitably one thing leads to another – which seems to mean more to Adam than Sarah. David encourages Nikki to leave George, devising a plan to put her husband's assets in her name, but Karen, facing rebellion from her daughters and her publishing company diminished, has her sobriety tested and Pete proves to be an unexpected saviour before her family regroups to support her. Meanwhile Jenny, having pushed reluctant son Adam to consider university admission, is made aware of her own potential as a mature student.
| 46 | Episode 6 | Terry McDonough | Mike Bullen | 13 October 2017 | 5.84 |
Pete and Adam plan a joint fiftieth birthday party at a country hotel, though Adam is still fighting his feelings for Sarah and trying to reconnect with Tina. Meanwhile Jenny starts her business course on a day release basis but is annoyed by Pete's laziness and insistence on Barbara staying with them. Romance is in the air however for Karen, having met handsome builder Gareth in a book-shop, and David with Nikki, who has fled her boorish husband. At the birthday party Jenny argues publicly with Pete whilst Adam is shocked when Sarah turns up, declaring her love for him.
| 47 | Episode 7 | Terry McDonough | Mike Bullen | 20 October 2017 | 5.87 |
The next morning Nikki and David are the only happy couple as Tina leaves Adam and Sarah tells him she put the sex tape on line out of revenge whilst Pete moves out of the family home. David also joins the ranks of the unhappy when Kirkbright, aware of the affair with Nikki, threatens his daughters, leading to David taking drastic action to win Nikki from him. Meanwhile an accident to their son reconciles the Giffords, Karen makes Gareth come clean to keep what they have got and Adam ends up with the lady of his choice.

=== Series 8 (2019) ===
ITV commissioned an eighth series of Cold Feet, the third since its 2016 reboot, on 30 October 2017. The series premiered on Monday, 14 January 2019.

| No. | Title | Directed by | Written by | Original release date | Viewers (millions) |
|---|---|---|---|---|---|
| 48 | Episode 1 | Rebecca Gatward | Mike Bullen | 14 January 2019. | 6.02 |
After suffering a few knockbacks, Adam starts to question whether he’s lost his mojo until he catches the eye of attractive young barista, Gemma. He’s initially cautious, but when she makes the first move and he decides to go for it, Matt’s reaction takes him by surprise. Mature student Jenny’s been throwing herself into uni life but all that looks set to change when she receives some unexpected news. Meanwhile, Pete bravely saves a young lad, Evan, from drowning but his efforts aren’t as appreciated as he might have liked.
| 49 | Episode 2 | Rebecca Gatward | Mike Bullen | 21 January 2019. | 5.45 |
Adam agrees to a suggestion from Karen and agrees to drama therapy. There, he understands some of his more unlikeable facets. Pete befriends a man he saved from a river, who is undergoing depression. Jenny's fears are revealed when she is informed that she has breast cancer. David accepts that his girlfriend will provide for both of them, while Karen warns her daughters of the dangers of the internet.
| 50 | Episode 3 | Rebecca Gatward | Mark Brotherhood | 28 January 2019. | 5.50 |
The gang go to a music festival to support Adam and his band. David enjoys the perks of festival life a little too much, Adam and Karen try to out-festival each other and Jenny lives it up with her college friends.
| 51 | Episode 4 | John Hardwick | Jan McVerry | 4 February 2019. | 5.49 |
David is homeless and penniless. Jenny has a lumpectomy. Karen sets Adam up to date her friend Caitlin.
| 52 | Episode 5 | John Hardwick | Debbie Oates & Ian Kershaw | 11 February 2019. | 5.46 |
David is living in an airport, until his friends realise and rally round. Jenny starts chemotherapy. Chloe, Jenny's daughter, asks Pete to adopt her. Adam splits up with Caitlin, and he and Karen finally admit their feelings for each other.
| 53 | Episode 6 | John Hardwick | Mike Bullen | 18 February 2019. | 5.58 |
Adam and Karen are enjoying the excitement of their fledging relationship, but are all too aware that their secret will need to come out sometime.

=== Series 9 (2020) ===
| No. | Title | Directed by | Written by | Original release date | Viewers (millions) |
|---|---|---|---|---|---|
| 54 | Episode 1 | Chris Foggin | Mike Bullen | 13 January 2020 | 5.24 |
Adam and Karen's relationship is tested when he moves himself and Matt into her house after landing himself in trouble at work. Jenny's treatment finally comes to an end, but it soon becomes obvious that Chloe is struggling to come to terms with her plight. David's affections for Mary begin to grow when she leaves him in charge of her cafe while she looks after her ailing mother.
| 55 | Episode 2 | Chris Foggin | Mark Brotherhood | 20 January 2020 | 4.86 |
Pete tries to improve relations between David and Adam by arranging for the gang to take part in a pub quiz. David's former boss causes a scene at the cafe, which results in an unexpected proposal. Adam accidentally invites Karen's mum over to stay. Pete's spell on the jury for the trial of a young girl caught in possession of illegal drugs has unexpected ramifications for Adam.
| 56 | Episode 3 | Fiona Walton | James Capel & Mike Bullen | 27 January 2020 | 4.73 |
Karen discovers that Liv has in fact moved in with Robyn, and not a friend, as she had previously claimed. Pete, Adam and David try to bond by climbing Scafell Pike together for charity, but only when Adam falls and sprains his ankle do relations between him and David begin to improve. Karen and Jenny enjoy an 80s themed weekend away, but tragedy strikes when Heather is taken ill.
| 57 | Episode 4 | Fiona Walton | Jan McVerry | 3 February 2020 | 4.96 |
A chance encounter gives Pete a boost. As Jenny faces fresh heartbreak, Karen attempts to make amends with her mother. David starts his new venture, but soon realizes that all is not as it seems.
| 58 | Episode 5 | Andrew Cumming | Unknown | 10 February 2020 | 5.09 |
Adam comes out on top, but his excitement is short-lived when reality hits. Karen is put in an impossible position. In the wake of her mother's death Jenny makes a discovery that sends her into a tailspin.
| 59 | Episode 6 | Andrew Cumming | Mike Bullen | 17 February 2020 | 4.86 |
Adam and Karen's future is thrown into jeopardy by an unexpected offer. Jenny braces herself for her first post-treatment mammogram, while Pete helps their son realize his dream. David is in turmoil over his growing feelings for Robyn.
