= Series 4, Episode 8 (Cold Feet) =

- Cold Feet episode
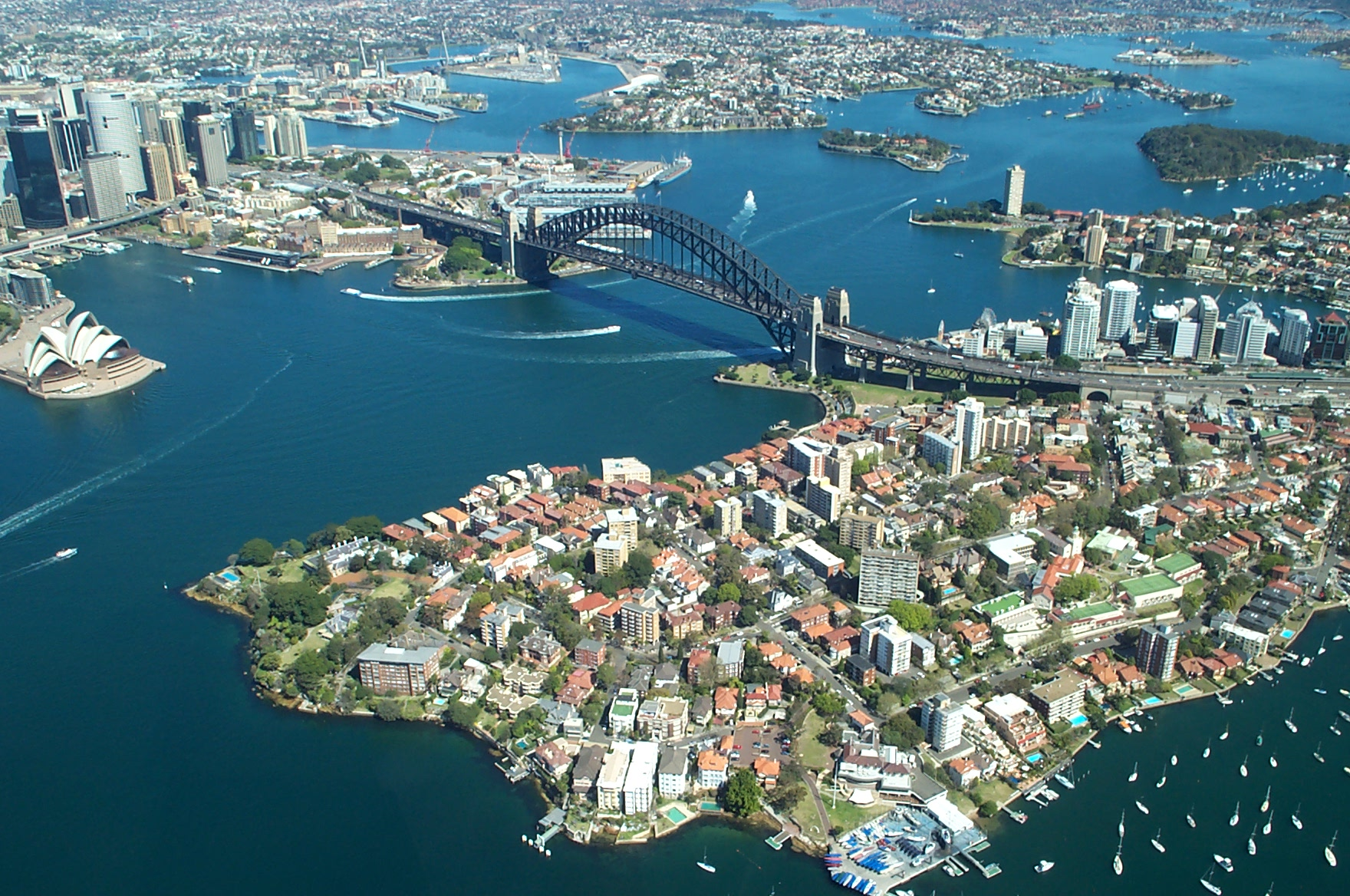
- The episode is set in Sydney, Australia
- Episode no.: Series 4 Episode 8
- Directed by: Ciaran Donnelly
- Written by: Mike Bullen
- Original air date: 10 December 2001
- Running time: 75 minutes

Guest appearances
- Stephen Barlow as Obstetrician; Rob Carroll as Doctor; Susannah Doyle as Lucy Bradley; Peter Feeney as Stewart Mayhew; Emma Glasner as Receptionist; Rita Hafouri as Bouquet Driver; Holly Jones as Maree; Caz Lederman as Real Estate Agent; Christine MacNicol as Transvestite; Jillian O'Dowd as Wedding Celebrant; Sean Pertwee as Mark Cubitt; John Rawls as Anaesthetist; Gary Sweet as Rod Ellison; Sandy Winton as Shawn

Episode chronology
← Previous; Series 4, Episode 7	Next → Series 5, Episode 1
- Cold Feet (series 4)

Series 4, Episode 8 (Note: In an article he wrote for the Western Mail in 2003, Mike Bullen titled this episode "Going to Australia".) is the final episode of the fourth series of the British comedy-drama television series Cold Feet. It was written by Mike Bullen, directed by Ciaran Donnelly, and was first broadcast on the ITV network on 10 December 2001. The plot follows on directly from the previous episode, as Adam and Rachel (James Nesbitt and Helen Baxendale), and Karen and David (Hermione Norris and Robert Bathurst) travel to Sydney, Australia for Pete and Jo's (John Thomson and Kimberley Joseph) impromptu wedding. Adam is sceptical that Pete is truly in love with Jo, and Jo's rich father Rod (Gary Sweet) suspects that Pete is only marrying her to get access to his money. Under pressure from Rod, Pete gets cold feet and he and Jo call off the wedding. The couple soon reconcile and marry with Rod's blessing. Meanwhile, David discovers that Karen has been having an affair with her colleague Mark (Sean Pertwee) and ends their marriage, and Rachel gives birth prematurely in a Sydney hospital.

The episode was conceived by Mike Bullen and Cold Feet's executive producer Andy Harries in 2000. Both attended a television conference in Sydney and decided to contrive the main plot of the fourth series so the characters would end up in Australia. Helen Baxendale was pregnant and could not fly to Australia, so all scenes featuring Rachel were filmed in Manchester and Salford, England. After location scouting and casting around the Sydney area in May and July, production in Australia ran for 18 days in October 2001. Locations used included a heritage home in Vaucluse for the wedding scenes, Palm Beach for a beach barbecue scene, and outside the Sydney Opera House. The episode was watched by nearly nine million people on its original UK broadcast and received a mixed reaction from newspaper critics; some believed the trip to Sydney was an unnecessary jaunt for the cast and crew, others selected the episode as a "pick of the day". It also received mixed reviews in Australia and New Zealand. Kimberley Joseph's performance was praised, as was Gary Sweet's guest role. The episode represented the series when it won the award for Best Drama Series at the British Academy Television Awards 2002.

== Plot ==
Adam and Rachel (James Nesbitt and Helen Baxendale), and Karen and David (Hermione Norris and Robert Bathurst) arrive in Sydney, Australia for Pete and Jo's (John Thomson and Kimberley Joseph) hastily arranged wedding. Jo's father Rod Ellison (Gary Sweet) is surprised to learn that his daughter is marrying a man he suspects is only after his money. After speaking to Rod, Adam tells Pete that he thinks the wedding is going ahead for the wrong reasons. Pete reacts angrily and tells Adam to forget being his best man. The following morning, Rod tries to bribe Pete to call off the wedding, but Pete declines. He later overhears Rod forbidding Jo to marry him and tells her they ought to postpone the wedding. Jo is devastated at his decision, and tells him to get out of her house. She confides her sorrow in her ex-fiancé Shawn (Sandy Winton), who unsuccessfully tries to restart their relationship by proposing to her.

Rachel, who is spending most of her time in her hotel room on account of her pregnancy, receives a visit from her expatriated lesbian sister Lucy (Susannah Doyle). Lucy tells Rachel that she has been sleeping around with men in order to have a child. When Adam learns of this, he suggests to Lucy that she use some of his banked sperm. They broach the idea to Rachel, who is disgusted at the thought of her husband having a baby with her sister and forbids it from going ahead. Meanwhile, Karen finally assures David that the animosity between them caused by his extramarital affair is in the past. She emails Mark Cubitt (Sean Pertwee), a man she has been having an affair with in England, to tell him their fling is over. Mark arrives at her apartment the next morning and spends the day with her after David cancels a visit to an art gallery with her. He convinces her that David is still the same insensitive man that he has always been. The next day, Karen tells Rachel that she will leave David to be with Mark.

Pete and Adam make up after their row and Adam goes to Jo's to collect Pete's clothes. Her regret over her breakup with Pete leads Adam to convince Rod that he should give the wedding his blessing. He follows David to a business meeting with Rod, which David has arranged as a prelude to emigrating his family to Sydney, and with David's help changes Rod's mind about Pete. Rod later meets Jo and Pete to give them his blessing, and they reconcile. On the day of the wedding, David finally reveals his plans for the family to Karen, unaware that Mark is in the apartment. Karen is surprised that David has made the plans, including finding a house for them to live in. Mark is irritated by David's attitude and reveals the affair to him. Enraged, David lashes out at Mark and the two fight. Karen angrily tells Mark to leave. Outside the hotel, Rachel goes into premature labour. Adam rushes her to hospital, where she is taken into surgery. At the wedding venue, Pete asks David to take Adam's place as best man. As Adam has the rings, David volunteers his own wedding band to Pete, and Karen does the same for Jo. Pete and Jo exchange their wedding vows and are pronounced husband and wife. After the wedding, Karen tries to approach David but he just walks away, telling her "no more". Later, Pete, Jo and Karen join Adam and Rachel at the hospital, where they are introduced to the baby, Matthew Sydney Williams. David flies home alone in tears.

== Production ==
=== Writing ===
The episode was devised following a lecture given by writer Mike Bullen and executive producer Andy Harries at the Screen Producers Association of Australia conference in November 2000. Bullen and Harries already knew that actress Fay Ripley did not want to renew her contract to play Jenny Gifford for the whole fourth series, so developed a storyline where Jenny's ex-husband Pete would meet and fall in love with an Australian woman after his divorce. The storyline would culminate in an episode set in Australia, which Harries wanted "for no desperately good reason except that it's a nice place to go". The storyline was plotted and Kimberley Joseph was cast as Jo Ellison, who makes her first appearance in Series 4, Episode 1. As originally planned, the fourth series would have depicted all of the main characters permanently emigrating to Australia; Bullen said, "One of them [the characters], whose relationship is no more, meets an Australian in England and he comes out here, and the notion is that the others follow. Then one of the others would have a reason for wanting to walk away from his life so he comes out here too. That's really an excuse to bring everyone out, and the final episode would be a 90-minute special looking back on their lives up to that point; because it would be the last episode with these characters." Having the characters permanently based in Australia opened up the possibility of spin-off series set in the country. The direction of the fourth series, and thus the finale, changed significantly when Helen Baxendale announced that she was pregnant.

Bullen wanted the episode to be an ordinary episode of Cold Feet that just happened to be set in Australia. The original script included stereotypical references to Australian culture, such as "prawns on the barbie", but these were cut to avoid turning the episode into a travelogue. Bullen told the Sun Herald, "I really wanted to go beyond 'no worries' and 'she'll be right mate'. We've asked most of the local actors to improvise with their own sayings, to make sure we get it right." In 2003, Bullen recalled this episode's script as the most difficult he had ever written. The collapse of Karen and David's marriage was a controversial issue among the writer and producers; two characters had already divorced and Harries wanted to avoid all three of the main relationships failing. After enjoying the quality of the Australian guest stars, Bullen joked to the Sun Herald that he would write a spin-off series featuring Gary Sweet. Eventually, no spin-off series were created. This episode was produced as the final episode of Cold Feet; Mike Bullen did not believe he could continue writing another series and cast members were eager to take other roles. During production in Australia, Bullen's interest in the series was renewed, and he decided he would like to write a final run of episodes.

=== Filming ===
Continuity was an absolute nightmare [...] You had actors walking through a door in Manchester and emerging onto a street in Sydney, and we had to make sure that they were wearing the same clothes, with the same skin tones, all the way through. Everything was packed into body bags and shipped out: wardrobe, accessories, and lots of Polaroids for reference.

— Spencer Campbell on the complexities of filming in Sydney without Helen Baxendale

The episode was directed by Ciaran Donnelly, who also directed the previous episode. Mike Bullen visited Sydney in March 2001 to scout for locations. He was followed in May by producer Spencer Campbell and production designer Chris Truelove, who made preliminary casting decisions and scouted more locations. They finalised the arrangements in July. Unusually, the production schedule was drawn up without a final script in place. This caused complications as Campbell allocated too much time for filming in Sydney and not enough in Manchester. As a result, some scenes set in Sydney were filmed in Manchester; the scene where the characters arrive at Sydney Airport was filmed in a hall at the University of Manchester. Campbell rationalised that viewers who had never been to Sydney would not be able to tell the difference.

Helen Baxendale was nearing the end of her pregnancy, so could not join the rest of the cast abroad, thus all of her scenes were filmed in Manchester and Salford. The scenes in Rachel and Adam's hotel room were shot at the Lowry Hotel in Salford and exterior scenes of the hotel were filmed at the GMEX Centre. The taxi that takes Rachel and Adam to the hospital was a Holden car imported to Britain from Australia and altered to look like a taxi. The final scene of the episode was filmed on an aeroplane set constructed in a studio. Robert Bathurst said, "We shot the scene in the studio because we weren't allowed to film on a real aircraft. So we had to get sections of a plane's interior and stick them all together. The bits were flapping all over the place whenever anyone moved. I had to look out the porthole and have a weep. As I was doing that, I looked out and there through the window, standing where the wing should be, was the show's carpenter trying to hold the set together."

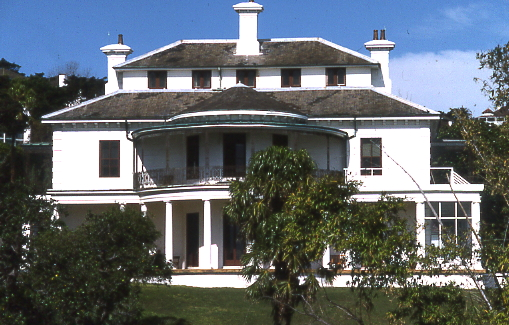
Strickland House, the exterior filming location for Pete and Jo's wedding

Production in Sydney commenced the week beginning 1 October and lasted for 18 days. The main cast and Sean Pertwee were flown out along with a skeleton crew. Additional staff were drawn from those already working for Granada Australia, the Australian production arm of Granada Productions, as flying a complete British crew overseas would have been prohibitively expensive. Filming locations included Hyde Park, Kirribilli, Double Bay and the Northern Beaches. The scenes of Shawn's barbecue were filmed in Palm Beach and the facade of a terraced house in Paddington was used for an establishing scene of Lucy's apartment. The wedding scenes were set in the grounds of Strickland House, Vaucluse. Another scene was filmed on location outside the Sydney Opera House. While preparing for the scene, Hermione Norris and Robert Bathurst were distracted by a group of British tourists yelling that Karen should leave David after David's affair in Series 3. The group remained quiet when the scene was being shot. Karen and David's apartment was filmed at a building near Luna Park in Milsons Point. A stunt team co-ordinated the fight scene between Mark and David but could not convincingly choreograph a headbutt between Mark and David. The stunt co-ordinator and Pertwee, who was already experienced in stunt fighting, agreed Pertwee would get a better reaction from Bathurst by almost headbutting his face for real, instead of "hitting air". Initially startled by the move, Bathurst conceded that it was better for him to be surprised as he might have flinched if he had known what Pertwee was about to do. Hermione Norris found the scene upsetting insofar as it was unusual to see Robert Bathurst playing David in such an emotional state.

== Reception ==
The episode was originally broadcast in an extended 90-minute commercial timeslot on 10 December 2001 on the ITV network in the United Kingdom (ITV1, STV and UTV) and on TV3 in Ireland. Unofficial overnight ratings recorded an average of 8.5 million viewers and a 37% audience share for the episode in the UK. Final ratings, accounting for PVR viewings, rose to 8.95 million (38% share), making it the twenty-first most-watched show of the week. The fourth series had been broadcast on ITV on consecutive Sunday and Monday nights, and the Monday ratings had been considerably lower. Episode 8 marked the peak of the Monday night ratings.

The episode received mixed reaction from newspaper critics. In the Liverpool Echo, Rachael Tinniswood wrote that the episode "was a fantastic display of everything that has made Cold Feet such a popular drama over the past few years" and that Kimberley Joseph had proved to be "a more than adequate replacement" for Fay Ripley over the course of the fourth series. Tony Purnell wrote in the Daily Mirror that "The fact that the gang ended up in Australia showed just how much the series had lost its way." Graham Young in the Birmingham Mail wrote that the excursion to Sydney "smacks more of giving the cast a treat after four years, rather than any real necessity of the script". The Daily Record's critic wrote "if this is the last-ever episode, we should make the most of what has been a relatively disappointing series". In a column about Chewin' the Fat, Scotsman critic Aidan Smith accused the episode—"which somehow managed to squeeze the Harbour Bridge into every shot"—of being the point the series jumped the shark. Times columnist Caitlin Moran described it as "both draining and tensifying". Moran went on to say that Adam and Rachel had become poorly characterised and suggested that Mike Bullen had come to loathe the characters. The episode was selected as a "pick of the day" in The Sunday Times. Writing in the Journal of British Cinema and Television in 2006, Greg M. Smith (Note: Associate Professor of Communications, Georgia State University.) analysed the development of the David character over the course of Series 4, including the fantasy scene in this episode where David imagines living with Karen in Australia, and the scene where David and Karen take off their wedding rings: "Old, exhausted love is traded for new, vibrant love in this single gesture. Karen pursues David as he storms off after the ceremony, shouting his name, undoubtedly ready to alternate once more between pain and partial forgiveness, as they have done throughout their marriage. David turns and says: 'No, Karen. No more'." Smith also compared the scene to the wedding scene in the film The Best Years of Our Lives (William Wyler, 1946).

ITV submitted the episode to the British Academy of Film and Television Arts (BAFTA) to represent the series in the Best Drama Series category at the British Academy Television Awards 2002. The series won, and the award was collected by Mike Bullen, Andy Harries and Spencer Campbell at the BAFTA ceremony in April 2002. The scene in which Pete meets Rod for the first time was voted "Best Dramatic Moment" at the BBC's annual TV Moments broadcast in 2002.

The episode was first broadcast in Australia on the Seven Network on 6 June 2002. Robin Oliver for the Sydney Morning Herald wrote "Unlike any of the other seemingly compulsory Oz adventures to which British TV panders, this one presents a superior storyline while soaking up the views." Oliver complimented the performances of Gary Sweet and Kimberley Joseph, and Ciaran Donnelly's direction. The Age's Debi Enker was critical, decrying the plot as "fairly creaky" and the locations as "a very glossy ad for the sights of Sydney". She also thought Gary Sweet and James Nesbitt looked bored in their roles. In New Zealand, the episode was broadcast on TV ONE on 17 September 2002. The New Zealand Herald's reviewer Michele Hewitson was critical of the clichés in the script, particularly the stereotypical characterisation of Rod Ellison, who she described as "a bit of a bastard". Hewitson was also critical of Karen's reaction to David's attempts to repair their relationship, and concluded by writing, "God only knows why they had to drag the entire cast all the way to Australia. You can take this lot out of Manchester but they'll still be moaning, angst-ridden and selfish."

== Home video ==
The episode was first released as part of the Cold Feet: The Complete 4th Series DVD and VHS. The set was released in the United Kingdom on 25 November 2002 and in Australia on 3 April 2007. It was also released on a single disc DVD in 2003 as a promotional venture between the Sunday Mirror and Woolworths.
