= Cold Feet series 4 =

Cold Feet
- Series 4
- No. of episodes: 8

Release
- Original network: ITV1
- Original release: 18 November – 10 December 2001

Series chronology
- ← Previous; Series 3 Next → Series 5

The fourth series of the British comedy drama television series Cold Feet was aired on the ITV network from 18 November to 10 December 2001. Eight episodes were broadcast over four weeks and the final episode was extended to 72 minutes. The plot of the series follows Adam (James Nesbitt) and Rachel (Helen Baxendale) trying to have children, the fallout between Karen (Hermione Norris) and David (Robert Bathurst) after his affair, and the departure of Jenny (Fay Ripley). Kimberley Joseph is introduced as Jo Ellison, the new woman in Pete's (John Thomson) life; their fast-developing romance leads to their marriage in the eighth episode, set in Sydney.

The series went through a series of schedule changes, as ITV attempted to rebrand its weekday output, and episodes were broadcast on two consecutive nights of the week. The final episode won Cold Feet the BAFTA for Best Drama Series.

== Episodes ==
No.	Title	Directed by	Written by	Original release date	Viewers (millions)
21	Episode 1	Tim Whitby	Mike Bullen	18 November 2001	9.24
When Rachel takes up amateur dramatics, Adam becomes jealous but is offered a small part in the play by the director after an angry outburst. At the same time he coaches Josh's football team, after David's sensitive touch has caused a stream of losses for it. Karen and David remain on amicable terms, for the sake of the children, following his affair with Jessica. Frustrated that she will not forgive him, he takes advice from Adam to become the man she has wanted; soon he is quoting Keats at breakfast and watching Spanish films, though only Ramona notices. Jenny and Pete's marriage has changed direction; he has moved back in with the family and she is pregnant and working for a large hotel chain. After a fact-finding trip to Rome the owner of the company offers Jenny a position as his personal assistant in New York. She declines the offer, but her mood changes when her doctor informs her that she has miscarried. Adam and Rachel decide to adopt, while Karen befriends Rachel's colleague Jo.
22	Episode 2	Tim Whitby	Mike Bullen	19 November 2001	6.96
Karen's drinking gets worse as she and David fight constantly, so he seeks counselling. Ramona is in demand; the owner of a strip club offers her a job and a nanny position has become available at a neighbour's house. Karen and Jo babysit Little Adam while Jenny tells Pete over dinner that she is taking Owen's PA job after all. Karen leaves early when David does not get home on time and Jenny is infuriated when she finds Jo, a drunken stranger to her, babysitting her child. Ramona hands in her notice, fed up with Karen, but when David sees her working in the strip club, he tells her not to work her notice. Adam and Rachel go to an adoption meeting, where Adam puts his foot in his mouth. Later he sees Jane in town and is horrified when Rachel invites her round for dinner. His ex reveals she followed him to Manchester because she is still in love with him. David's therapy leads him to offer Ramona her job back, but his optimism is ruined when Karen tells him to move out. Jenny leaves for New York with Little Adam.
23	Episode 3	Tim Whitby	Mike Bullen	25 November 2001	8.96
David has moved in with Pete after being thrown out of his house. Karen has a girls' night in with an old friend called Bella, and Ramona, Rachel, Jo and Jane. She drinks heavily and insults Bella, while Jane comes close to revealing her the relationship she had with Adam. Rachel is still unaware the following morning when she almost catches Jane, whom she invited to stay the night, groping Adam in the kitchen. Karen takes Pete out on a night of drinking, but leaves him in a bar to go clubbing with the bar owner. Adam decides to tell Jane to leave, but accidentally reveals his relationship to his wife when he finds the two talking. After a violin recital at Josh's school, Karen nearly crashes the car. David berates her for her recklessness and she joins him at his therapy in an effort to get her drinking under control.
24	Episode 4	Paul Kousoulides	Mike Bullen and Mark Chappell	26 November 2001	7.21
After the revelation of Adam and Jane's near-affair, Rachel refuses to speak to him, cutting up bunches of flowers he has sent to her by way of apology. David steps in, reminding her that Adam forgave her after she slept with her ex-husband Kris, and that nothing even happened between Adam and Jane. After making up, the two are introduced to Laura, a potential adoptee, and the three bond. Pete's mother Audrey arrives at his house and immediately begins cleaning and cooking for him and David. Jo walks out of her job when she doesn't get a promotion. Pete and David arrive home one evening to find Audrey sitting in a smouldering kitchen. She reveals her memory has slowly been going, and he decides that she should move in with him. After both reconsider, she moves into sheltered housing, taking with her a dog Pete got for company. Josh's standards begin slipping at school, so Karen and David agree that David should come home for his sake. When Rachel begins feeling ill, a visit to the doctor reveals she is pregnant.
25	Episode 5	Paul Kousoulides	Mike Bullen	2 December 2001	9.79
As David moves out of Pete's Jo moves in; after quitting her job she cannot pay rent and her landlord has evicted her. Adam and Rachel show Laura her bedroom and later tell the adoption agent of Rachel's pregnancy. This does not sit well with her and she tells them the adoption cannot go ahead as it is not in Laura's best interests to live with them, devastating them. David and Karen attend a party, where she meets Mark Cubitt (Sean Pertwee), a publisher who asks her to edit a book his wife, Geraldine, is writing. Pete, David and Adam join Jo's aerobics class and Pete and David later go running with her. Pete slowly falls in love with her, but is alarmed when she starts seeing someone, Suggs (Paterson Joseph) from his work. Rachel and Adam see a solicitor about contesting the adoption agency decision, but are resigned to the fact they have to let Laura go.
26	Episode 6	Paul Kousoulides	Mike Bullen	3 December 2001	8.03
While Rachel visits Jenny in New York, Adam organises a poker night. Everyone leaves but he is still eager to gamble, so he and Ramona visit a casino. Pete buys an MG, which Adam borrows without telling him. On his fantasy joyride he hooks up with an attractive woman and they go back to her place. Pete has reported the car stolen but finds it and drives it home. He winds up being stopped after Adam also reports it stolen. Mark gives Karen a necklace and offers her a permanent job with him, which she refuses. David buys Karen a racehorse for her birthday without realising the cost of upkeep. After trying to offload it on his company he puts it in at Chester, but it loses the race. Jo asks Pete out on a date after she dumps Suggs.
27	Episode 7	Ciaran Donnelly	Mike Bullen	9 December 2001	8.83
Rachel returns, ready for sex, but is worried Adam no longer finds her attractive because of her size. Karen meets Mark at a hotel where he has booked a room. She tells Rachel of her feelings for him and she tells her to do what she has to. At the book launch, Geraldine tells Karen that Mark has had many affairs before this one, though Mark later tells her he will leave Geraldine to be with her. Pete avoids sex with Jo, worried that she will not find him attractive naked. David's boss Natalie tasks him with making a list of redundancies. Hard pressed to come up with a good list, he puts everyone's name down, including his own, but accidentally emails it to the rest of the office. When the head of the company sees it, he fires Natalie and promotes David. When Jo's visa expires, she decides to go back to Australia, thinking he does not like her. He follows her and she proposes to him.
28	Episode 8	Ciaran Donnelly	Mike Bullen	10 December 2001	8.95
The group flies to Sydney for Pete and Jo's wedding. David books a hotel room with a view of the harbour in an effort to make a new start with Karen. Impressed by this, she emails Mark to tell him that the affair is over. Rachel meets with her sister Lucy (Susannah Doyle), who tells her she is screening men to father a child with, despite being a lesbian. Adam volunteers his banked sperm but Rachel talks him out of it. Pete meets Jo's rich father, Rod Ellison (Gary Sweet), who tries to pay him off after thinking he is marrying Jo only for the money. Pete flatly refuses. Mark arrives in Sydney, telling Karen he has left Geraldine to be with her. When David tells Karen that he wants the family to move to Australia, Mark reveals the affair, leading to a fight between the two. Adam changes Rod's mind about Pete and the couple prepares to marry. Rachel goes into premature labour and is given a caesarean section at the hospital. At the wedding, Pete is without a best man and the rings, so David and Karen offer theirs. Karen tries to talk to David after the ceremony, but he refuses and flies back to England alone.

== Production ==
The final episode of the third series drew 9.1 million viewers, the highest audience figure for the programme. By then the fourth series was already in pre-production, and it was decided by the production crew and the cast that the show should end after the fourth to stop it from "going stale". Fay Ripley left Cold Feet during this series, not wishing to spend months away from her home filming the series. She believed Jenny had nowhere left to go in terms of character development, having already given birth to a child and separated from Pete. During the development stage of this series, she encouraged Bullen to write Jenny out by severely maiming her, though they both came to the agreement that Jenny would take a job in New York, leaving open the possibility that she could return in the future. To fill Ripley's place in the cast, the producers scouted for a new actress. Spencer Campbell went to Los Angeles and auditioned former Home and Away actress Kimberley Joseph, who was looking for work in America. Campbell soon hired her as Jo Ellison. Bullen had originally planned for Jo to be a "big fat truck-driving lesbian type", but the character was toned down when he met Joseph. Victoria Smurfit reprised her role as Jane Fitzpatrick for two episodes, while Sean Pertwee joined the series in the recurring role of Mark Cubbit for the last four episodes. Baxendale did not appear in the sixth episode, filmed in July and August; she took time off filming during the late stage of her pregnancy. Rachel's absence was explained away by having her visiting Jenny in New York.

Despite it being established in the third series that Rachel was unable to conceive a child because of her abortion, Helen Baxendale's pregnancy meant a "twist" was needed in the plot, and the apparently miraculous conception was worked into the storyline. Initially, the pregnancy was to be revealed in the sixth episode, but when Baxendale began showing early, the plot was moved forward by two episodes. Bullen wrote a scene showing the social worker crying after turning down Adam and Rachel's adoption application to show a positive portrayal of the profession, against what appeared in media at the time. While taking advantage of the location for filming, the eighth episode was written as a normal episode "about [the] characters who happened to be in Australia". The breakup of the Giffords' and Marsdens' marriages allowed Bullen to combine different characters in scenes who aren't often seen together, in particular the third episode, which saw Pete and Karen clubbing together. By this series Bullen was writing the characters as more like the actors who played them, compared to basing them on his friends as he did when Cold Feet began.

Filming was scheduled between April and October 2001, though did not begin until late May. Spencer Campbell produced episodes 1–3 and 7–8 and Emma Benson, a script supervisor on previous series, produced the other four. Between the third and fourth series, Bullen and Harries did a speaking tour in the Far East and Australia, where they decided to work a trip to Sydney into the storyline for no reason other than it was "a nice place to go". The main cast, Pertwee and a skeleton production crew were flown out to Sydney to film on location, filming for 18 days in Sydney in October 2001. A local film crew was hired as flying the regular production crew to Australia would have been prohibitively expensive. A stunt team co-ordinated the fight scene between Mark and David, but could not convincingly choreograph a headbutt between Mark and David. Pertwee, already experienced in stunt fighting, and the stunt coordinator agreed Pertwee would get a better reaction from Bathurst by almost hitting him straight on his face, instead of "hitting air". Bad scheduling meant the time for filming in Manchester ran out, so scenes depicting the characters at Manchester Airport were shot in Sydney. Banners promoting the 2002 Commonwealth Games were hung up for authenticity. Scenes featuring Rachel's hotel room were shot at the Lowry Hotel in Salford, while the exteriors used the GMEX Centre.

== Broadcast ==
In an effort to draw the ABC1 demographic to Sunday nights, ITV's director of channels David Liddiment moved the series from Sunday to Monday, replacing it with two "upmarket" dramas. Shortly before the first episode was broadcast, it was rescheduled to both Sunday and Monday nights to compete with a BBC costume drama and Dalziel and Pascoe.

== Reception ==
The first episode had 8.9 million viewers, beating a BBC One adaptation of The Way We Live Now. Episodes shown on Monday had lower ratings than the Sunday episodes, averaging only 6.9 million, due to the scheduling of the game show Shafted as a lead-in. ITV moved Who Wants to Be a Millionaire? to Shafted's timeslot and Cold Feet's ratings picked up, with the eighth episode getting 8.5 million and a 37% share. The fifth episode was the series highest rated episode, with final ratings of 9.87 million, making it the 13th most-watched drama of the year.

Comparing the series to The Way We Live Now, Andrew Billen wrote in the Evening Standard that Cold Feet was "the real way we live now", citing the emotional relationships in the series as examples of real-life behaviour. Despite this, the series was regarded as not on par with previous ones; Billen wrote in New Statesman that the series was "running on half a tank" and James Nesbitt said it "wasn't great".

The series was awarded the BAFTA for Best Drama Series for the wedding episode and Most Popular Comedy Programme at the National Television Awards. The scene in which Pete meets Rod for the first time was voted "Best Dramatic Moment" at the BBC's annual "TV Moments" ceremony in 2002.

== Home media ==
The series was rated by the British Board of Film Classification on 5 September 2002, with episodes 1–6 and 8 receiving a 12 rating and episode 7 a 15. Cold Feet: The Complete 4th Series was released on region 2 DVD by Video Collection International and Granada Video on 25 November 2002. and was re-released in new packaging by Granada Ventures on 20 March 2006. A DVD of the eighth episode was made available in 2003 in a joint promotional venture between the Sunday Mirror and Woolworths.
