= Cold Feet series 5 =

Cold Feet
- Series 5
- No. of episodes: 4

Release
- Original network: ITV1
- Original release: 23 February – 16 March 2003

Series chronology
- ← Previous; Series 4 Next → Series 6

The fifth series of the British comedy drama television series Cold Feet was broadcast on the ITV network from 23 February to 16 March 2003. This was the final series of the original run of the drama until it was revived in 2016, and while the number of episodes was halved compared to the previous series, the running time was increased from 46 minutes to 72 minutes per episode, necessitating a 95-minute timeslot. The plot of the series follows three couples: Adam (James Nesbitt) and Rachel (Helen Baxendale) getting to grips with bringing up baby Matthew (born in the final episode of the previous series), the return of Pete (John Thomson) and Jo (Kimberley Joseph) from their honeymoon, and the subsequent breakdown of their marriage, and the divorce proceedings between Karen (Hermione Norris) and David (Robert Bathurst).

The producers had originally intended to end the programme in 2001 but pressure for another run meant it came back for one last series. Critics welcomed the decision to end the series and the final episode gained the highest viewing figure in the history of the programme, with 10.7 million people. Numerous accolades were endowed on the programme (particularly for the final episode, which rated highly in viewer polls) including the prestigious Best Comedy Award at the British Comedy Awards.

== Episodes ==
No.	Title	Directed by	Written by	Original release date	Viewers (millions)
29	Episode 1	Ciaran Donnelly	Mike Bullen	23 February 2003	8.78
Three months after their wedding, Pete and Jo return to Manchester from Australia and immediately find Pete's mum, Audrey, living with them after she is evicted from her sheltered housing. Audrey's arthritis keeps her, and consequently Pete and Jo, awake so Jo suggests marijuana as a way of easing her joints. They obtain some from a local dealer and Audrey moves into new accommodation at the end of the episode. Karen and David are living separately and trying to get an amicable divorce. Karen meets Mark (Sean Pertwee), the man she had an affair with, for the first time since the Sydney trip, who suggests she gets a better financial settlement from David. David hires a new solicitor, Robyn Duff (Lucy Robinson), who suggests using Karen's alcoholism as grounds for a custody battle. Adam feels sidelined as Rachel spends every waking hour with baby Matthew, and he walks out of his son's naming ceremony, saying he does not love him. Rachel reveals her obsessive coddling of the child is because she once dropped him on the floor. Ramona (Jacey Sallés) falls for swimming instructor Lee (Richard Armitage) at a health club.
30	Episode 2	Ciaran Donnelly	Mike Bullen	2 March 2003	8.47
Pete and Jo are investigated by immigration officials, who have suspicions that their marriage is staged so Jo can get a visa. Pete begins to doubt her love for him when he discovers an email in which she says she would "Do anything to stay in the country". Pete's trust in Jo is shattered, and the marriage begins to collapse. As Rachel's maternity leave draws to a close and she returns to work, Adam is made redundant. He takes Matthew to a parent and child group and fails to keep up with a singalong but eventually secures a new job while Rachel is away. Karen and David's divorce proceedings escalate as Robyn pressures David to seek custody of the children. The two later spend the night together while Karen encourages Mark to bond with the children for the sake of their resumed relationship. After an incident leaves Josh in tears, Mark tells Karen he can love only her, not her children, and leaves. Karen and David resume their amicable divorce, while Ramona and Lee spend the night together.
31	Episode 3	Simon Delaney	Mike Bullen and Matt Greenhalgh	9 March 2003	9.81
Adam and Rachel learn that their rented house is to be auctioned and they begin to look for a new place to live. Adam's estranged father, Bill (Ian McElhinney), arrives but Adam wants nothing to do with him. Bill tells Adam that his mother stopped the contact between them after he had an affair with a man and Adam reluctantly tries to bond with him. Jo and Pete slowly mend their marriage but, on a trip away, she sleeps with Lee, who has asked Ramona to move in with him. Feeling guilty, Jo confesses the affair to Karen. David avoids Robyn's calls after their personal feelings affected the divorce petition but when they make up, he decides to introduce her to his friends. Adam finds a house, though Rachel is not so keen on it. Bill later offers to make up the difference so they can afford their current place, and Adam goes to the auction. He wins the bidding and phones Rachel to tell her the good news. Seconds after she hangs up, her car is hit by a truck. Her friends gather at her hospital bedside where, despite Adam's optimism that she will recover, she dies from her injuries.
32	Episode 4	Tim Sullivan	Mike Bullen	16 March 2003	10.72
Adam sees Rachel everywhere as he and his friends gather for her funeral. Pete's ex-wife Jenny (Fay Ripley) arrives at the crematorium, heavily-pregnant. As she has nowhere to stay, Jo invites her to hers and Pete's house. Adam shows no apparent signs of grief as he returns to work almost immediately. Concerned, his friends visit him, but he rejects their help until he sees Matthew crawling; what he has lost overwhelms him and he goes to see Karen. Pete and Jenny grow closer as he bonds with his son. Lee asks Ramona to marry him, causing Karen to reveal his affair with Jo and leaving both Ramona and Pete furious with their partners. The group travels to Portmeirion to scatter Rachel's ashes. When they get back to Manchester, Pete tells Jo he wants a divorce and she decides to go back to Australia. Jenny moves back in with Pete, suggesting he pretend to be the father of her unborn child. David resumes his relationship with Robyn, and Karen and Ramona plan a break in Spain. Adam packs his belongings and phones his father, leaving Manchester with Matthew.

== Production ==
Mike Bullen vowed that he would not write a fifth series after the fourth ended so well in 2001, but was persuaded to write it when executive producer Andy Harries suggested he should kill off a character. James Nesbitt was not keen to return to do another series but Bullen persuaded him to by offering to have Adam's cancer return with fatal consequences (the character had recovered from a testicular cancer scare in the second series). Despite this, Bullen was unable to make Adam's death funny and, following a meeting with Harries, decided it should be Rachel who died. Harries scheduled a meeting with Helen Baxendale at the Groucho Club, where they discussed the development. The scenes where Adam talks to Rachel's spirit were inspired by Truly, Madly, Deeply and Ghost. Bullen co-wrote the script of episode three with Matt Greenhalgh.

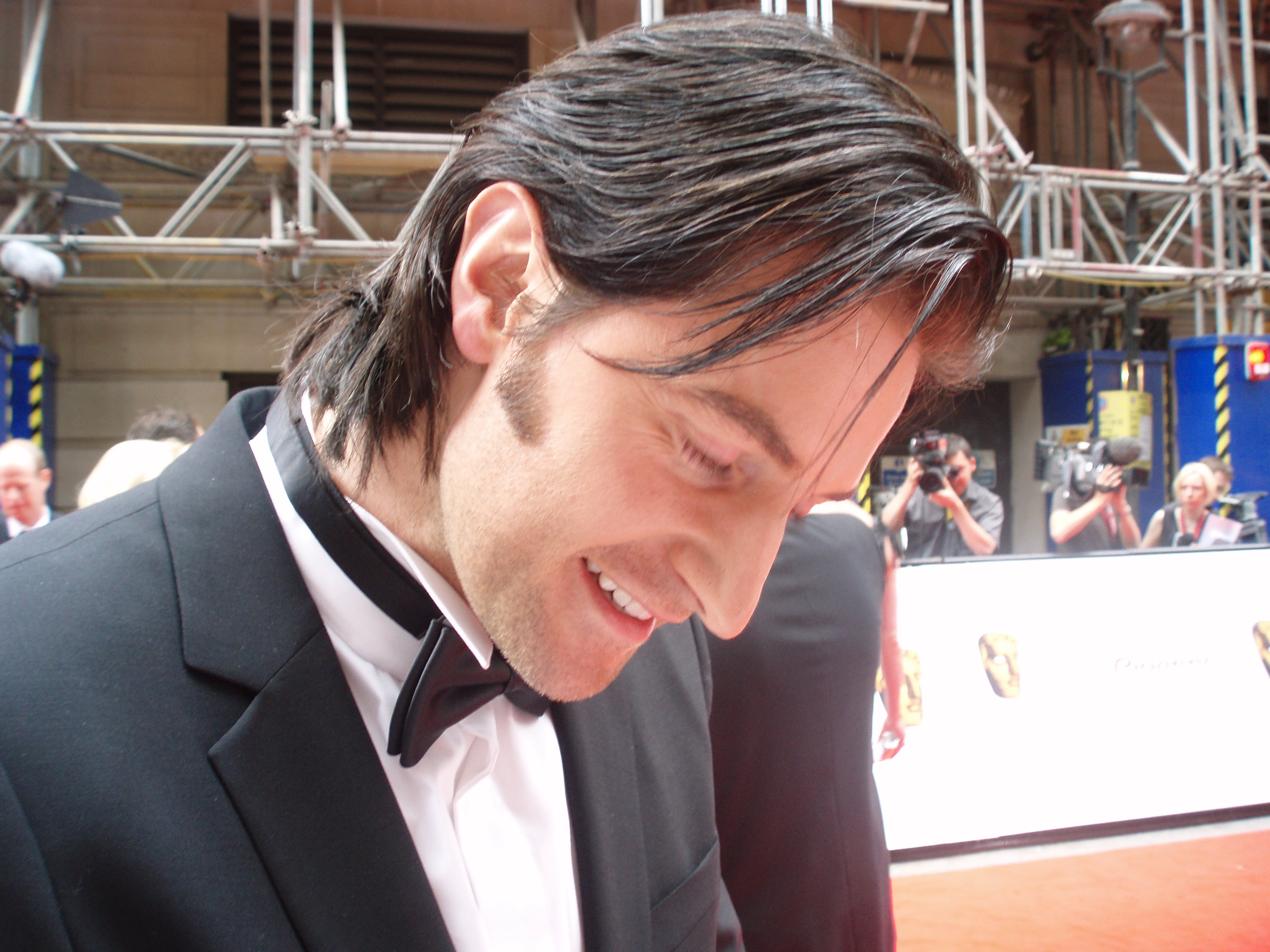
Richard Armitage wore a pair of old boots to his audition for the part of Lee

Richard Armitage secured the role of Lee when he arrived at his audition wearing a pair of old boots, something that greatly impressed producer Spencer Campbell. In order to match the scripted description of his character, Armitage began a heavy workout regimen and took aqua-aerobics lessons to better understand Lee's profession. His first scene was a sex scene with Ramona. Despite leaving the series in 2001, Fay Ripley was persuaded to return to the programme for one last appearance as Jenny in the final episode. To make sure the rest of the cast agreed to return, their salaries were increased to £75,000 per episode, a 50% increase on their pay for the fourth series (though Joseph earned less).

Episodes one and two were directed by Ciaran Donnelly, episode three by Simon Delaney and episode four by Tim Sullivan. Ripley was in the late stages of pregnancy and permitted to work for only a short amount of time, so the fourth episode was filmed before the third. Ripley did not travel to Portmeirion with the rest of the cast, so a make-up artist stood in as Jenny in the beach and clifftop scenes, wearing the prosthetic stomach originally made for Ripley in the first series. A close-up of Jenny standing next to Jo was filmed in front of a similar backdrop in Manchester and edited into the location footage. The producers endeavoured to film on location once per series but the high cost of the Sydney episode and the rising salaries of the cast meant the budget could not permit travel any further than Portmeirion, a village most famous as the location in The Prisoner. Rachel's car accident was filmed on location in Moston, Greater Manchester in the early hours of 6 October 2002. Following the completion of filming, the sets were dismantled and moved to landfill sites.

Robert Bathurst was displeased with the development of David and Robyn's relationship; he told The Times, "I had a long run-in with the producers. Here was an opportunity for the character to have his first friendship and they used the stock telly drama for friendship of having a shag. I said it's shallow and it's sordid. So they wrote a scene with a self-disgusted David saying 'It's shallow and it's sordid.'"

Mark Russell composed an extended score for the scenes depicting Rachel's death and its aftermath, using music software to recreate the acoustics of the Cathedral of Chartres: "We decided what we wanted was quite an elegiac piece of music that becomes more and more emotional so it doesn't reflect the frenzy of the hospital."

== Broadcast ==
The four episodes were broadcast in a Sunday night timeslot from 9 p.m. to 10.35 p.m.

== Reception ==
The first and second episodes each secured overnights of 8 million, with the first taking a 33% audience share. Ratings grew as the series progressed; episode three scored 9.4 million viewers and the finale drew 10.2 million, with a 42% share. Final figures took it to 10.7 million, making it the eighth most-watched drama and 15th most-watched terrestrial programme of 2003. During production of the series, tabloid newspapers published stories that four funeral scenes had been filmed and a final decision on which would air would be made close to the broadcast. The Sunday Mirror quoted Andy Harries as being "undecided" over who would die in a report published in September 2002, though by this time production on the last episodes was well under way.

Critical reviews were favourable and the decision to end the series was welcomed; Paul Hoggart of The Times called the formula of the series "less surprising" and audiences had only "residual interest in the characters". Writing in New Statesman, Andrew Billen compared the appearance of Rachel's ghost to that of Gary Shepherd in thirtysomething, and its inspiration The Big Chill. Billen was unsurprised when Mark told Karen he was a "child hater" and that Jo married Pete solely to stay in the country, suggesting that viewers had seen the plots coming for a long time. Reviewing for BBC News Online, Darren Waters wrote that the finale had a "thankful lack of sentimentality", though called the scenes in Portmeirion an "unnecessary coda". The Spectator's Simon Hoggart believed that Baxendale's portrayal of Rachel as a "fraught and snippy woman" was detrimental to the character, causing him to have less sympathy for her and more for Matthew. He praised the strengths and flaws of all the female characters.

Tesco Personal Finance recorded a 20% increase in calls from people wanting to take out life insurance policies. A spokesman attributed the surge to people watching Rachel's death in a car accident.

The series secured the Best Comedy Drama award at the 2003 British Comedy Awards and Nesbitt was voted Most Popular Comedy Performer at the National Television Awards in the same year. Other viewer polls placed Rachel's car crash as "Best Drama Moment" at the BBC's annual "TV Moments" ceremony in 2004 and a poll conducted by cable provider NTL in the same year placed the finale as the fourth best of all time. Adam's speech at Rachel's funeral came 69th in the Channel 4 poll The 100 Greatest Tearjerkers, broadcast in February 2005. In 2008, Rachel's car crash was ranked at number three in Sky One's 50 Greatest TV Endings.

== Home media ==
Video Collection International and Granada Video released Cold Feet: The Complete 5th Series on region 2 DVD on 24 March 2003. The four 72-minute episodes were reconfigured into six quasi-episodes of varying lengths, which were rated by the British Board of Film Classification (BBFC) on 17 March 2003; episode "1" was rated 15, episodes "2", "4" and "6" as 12, and episodes "3" and "5" as PG. The series was re-released in new packaging by Granada Ventures on 20 March 2006.
