= Housing for the elderly in the United Kingdom =

Housing for the elderly in the United Kingdom has become a developing specialised sector later than in some countries. The most successful projects integrate housing with leisure facilities and social care. Generally, people become eligible for specialised housing at 55.

== History ==
England has provided almshouses for the poor and destitute since at least the tenth century. Many institutions, which were called hospitals up until the nineteenth century, fulfilled mainly a housing function. Almshouse residents normally do not pay rent—but have no security of tenure and depend solely on the goodwill of the administering trustees.

Sheltered housing schemes are generally owned, run, and maintained as social housing by a local authority or housing association. They became widespread in the twentieth century.

Retirement villages and other owner-occupied retirement housing developed more recently.

== Demographics ==
The number of people aged 65 and over in the UK is set to grow from 11.6 million in 2015 to 17.2 million by 2035, an increase of more than 50%, while the number of people aged 85 and over is set to more than double from just over 1.5 million in 2015 to almost 3.2 million in 2035, an increase of over 131%.

One quarter of UK homeowners aged 60 and over—around 3.5 million people—express particular interest in buying a retirement property for reasons that range from moving closer to family, to reducing the risk of accidents by moving into purpose-built accommodation.

Those aged 60 and over also hold approximately £1.3 trillion in housing equity, with £400 billion of this tied up in homes of those who want to downsize, which indicates that alongside a strong inclination to move, providing the options to allow them to access this wealth through downsizing, could help older property owners to address the challenge of funding costs associated with later life, such as care needs.

However, as of April 2014, there were only about 128,000 retirement properties built for owner occupiers in England and Wales.

The Royal Institute of British Architects produced a report in July 2019 calling for urgent action to tackle the "severe lack of age-friendly housing". They said this was putting a huge strain on the public purse because of the health and social care costs of inappropriate housing. They want all new-build housing to be accessible and adaptable. In September 2019 in a survey of real estate professionals 91% expected demand for retirement living to slightly or significantly increase over the next 5 years.

== See also ==
Category:Housing for the elderly in the United Kingdom
