= Cold Feet series 3 =

Cold Feet
- Series 3
- No. of episodes: 8

Release
- Original network: ITV
- Original release: 5 November – 26 December 2000

Series chronology
- ← Previous; Series 2 Next → Series 4

The third series of the British comedy-drama television series Cold Feet was first broadcast on the ITV network from 12 November to 26 December 2000. The eight episodes were written by Mike Bullen and David Nicholls, produced by Christine Langan and Spencer Campbell, and directed by Simon Delaney, Jon Jones, and Tim Whitby. The storylines, which focus on three couples, continue from the end of the second series; Adam Williams and Rachel Bradley (James Nesbitt and Helen Baxendale) try to conceive their first child, and get married at the end of the series; Pete and Jenny Gifford (John Thomson and Fay Ripley) have separated after he had an affair with a co-worker. They date different people throughout the series but reconcile in the last episode. After Karen Marsden (Hermione Norris) gives birth to baby twins, her husband David (Robert Bathurst) has an affair with a local political activist, which damages their marriage.

Bullen stepped back from writing the series during pre-production, believing no new storylines could be created for the characters. David Nicholls was one of five writers hired to write the series; when the other four writers were dismissed by producers Granada Television because their scripts were not of the right standard, Bullen returned to write half the series. The eighth episode was the highest-rated of the series, getting 9.66 million viewers on its Boxing Day broadcast. The series won a British Comedy Award the following year, and was nominated for Royal Television Society awards, a Banff Rockie award, and an International Emmy Award. Fay Ripley received a nominated for the British Academy Television Award for Best Actress.

== Cast ==
- James Nesbitt as Adam Williams
- Helen Baxendale as Rachel Bradley
- John Thomson as Pete Gifford
- Fay Ripley as Jenny Gifford
- Robert Bathurst as David Marsden
- Hermione Norris as Karen Marsden

=== Recurring ===
- Jacey Salles as Ramona Ramirez (Episodes 1, 3, 4, 5, 7)
- Nicholas Ball as Felix Bishop (Episodes 1, 2, 3)
- Yasmin Bannerman as Jessica Barnes (Episodes 2, 3, 4, 5, 7)
- Richard Dillane as Miles Brodie (Episodes 4, 5)
- Mel Martin as Heather Childs (Episodes 1, 2, 3)
- Ben Miles as Robert Brown (Episodes 1, 2, 3, 4, 5, 7, 8)
- Pooky Quesnel as Emma Keaton (Episodes 5, 7, 8)

== Episodes ==
No.	Title	Directed by	Written by	Original release date	Viewers (millions)
13	Episode 1	Simon Delaney	Mike Bullen	12 November 2000	8.33
Pete and Jenny have separated, so he has been living at Adam and Rachel's. He moves back in with Jenny as her lodger when Adam and Rachel tire of his uncleanliness. As Karen and David return home with their new baby twins, Ellie and Olivia, Heather, Karen's ex-pat mother, arrives from Spain. At a dinner party, she takes a liking to Felix, one of David's clients. Jenny has also been invited, and is smitten with Robert, another client. Pete prepares breakfast for Jenny on their anniversary but is saddened when she receives flowers from Robert. Rachel tells Adam that her period is late.
14	Episode 2	Simon Delaney	David Nicholls	12 November 2000	8.33
Pete starts searching for a place of his own as Jenny and Robert start going on dates. He eventually finds a house-share with Matthew, a middle-aged divorced man who he is later shocked to discover is gay. Rachel's pregnancy turns out to be a false alarm. A visit to the doctor informs them that Rachel's inability to conceive might be related to her abortion. Jessica, a local political activist, arrives on the Marsdens' doorstep. David attends a local residents' meeting and becomes attracted to Jessica.
15	Episode 3	Simon Delaney	David Nicholls	19 November 2000	9.87
Pete and Ramona start seeing each other after an encounter in the park, and Jenny has to deal with her friends' reluctance to get to know Robert. Adam and Rachel attend their first appointment for Rachel's intracytoplasmic sperm injection. Heather smacks Josh but makes up with Karen and later returns to Spain. David organises his own 40th birthday party and decides to make it fancy-dress. At the party, he kisses Jessica, and Jenny becomes jealous when she sees Pete and Ramona dance. The next morning, David is surprised to find a Harley-Davidson motorbike in the kitchen.
16	Episode 4	Jon Jones	Mike Bullen	26 November 2000	8.60
Pete and Ramona spend more time with each other, and she watches him play on Matthew's all-gay football team. Karen meets up with her old college friend, photographer Miles Brodie, as David spends more and more time with Jessica. The cost of Adam and Rachel's ICSI treatment begins to mount. Results from a scan come back, and it is revealed that Rachel is suffering from "partial Asherman's syndrome" resulting from her abortion. Later, he proposes to her.
17	Episode 5	Jon Jones	Mike Bullen	3 December 2000	9.14
Adam and Rachel's friends show public support when they announce their engagement, but secretly believe they are doing it for the wrong reasons. Karen becomes jealous of Jenny when she takes charge of planning Brodie's photography exhibition. David and Jessica book into a hotel for a dirty afternoon, and Pete begins chatting with "Girlpower", a woman on an Internet chatroom. She asks to meet him at the school where she works, where it turns out he was set up by two schoolgirls. However, he does get a date with their teacher, Emma. After abandoning the idea of a long engagement, Adam and Rachel decide to get married as soon as possible.
18	Episode 6	Jon Jones	David Nicholls	10 December 2000	9.24
Pete and David take Adam on a stag weekend to Belfast and Portrush, where he grew up. At a surprise party, he is reunited with his old girlfriend, Jane Fitzpatrick (Victoria Smurfit), and later drunkenly falls asleep in her bed. Pete discovers David's affair with Jessica, and makes him promise to break up with her when they get home. Meanwhile, Rachel has taken Karen and Jenny to a health spa. Jenny lets slip that she once kissed Adam and Rachel is furious. They make up and decide to meet up with their partners in Northern Ireland. Rachel tells Adam that she knows about him and Jenny and he does not tell her that he kissed Jane the night before.
19	Episode 7	Tim Whitby	David Nicholls	17 December 2000	9.09
Jenny takes charge of planning Adam and Rachel's wedding as Adam buys Rachel an unattractive engagement ring. David unceremoniously breaks up with Jessica in a restaurant, where they are seen by Robert. After Karen is arrested for tackling a car thief, David takes her out to dinner, where she begins to suspect something is wrong. An argument over the engagement ring leads Adam and Rachel to scale back their wedding plans; they opt for a simple register office ceremony instead of at a large country house. Pete, enjoying his dates with Emma, asks Jenny for a divorce.
20	Episode 8	Tim Whitby	Mike Bullen	26 December 2000	9.66
On the morning of the wedding, Pete wonders if divorcing Jenny is the right thing to do. As Robert is moving his things out of Jenny's house, he tells her that David is having an affair. She tells Rachel and they both wonder whether to tell Karen. Adam arrives late to the registry office after Pete forgets to arrange for a car. The reception is held at Karen and David's. David realises that everyone except Karen knows about the affair, and tells her himself. He offers to leave but she decides that they should stay together for the kids. The episode ends with the couples watching Adam and Rachel's wedding video, filmed by Pete. Though David and Karen's marriage appears to be over, Pete and Jenny are back together.

== Broadcast ==
The episodes suffered from ITV's late decision to insert a third commercial break into evening programming; like many other series that had already completed post-production, Cold Feet's editors were forced to alter their episodes to allow for the extra breaks. Writing in Revolution magazine, John Owen, the head of media company Starcom, criticised the fact that up to 25 advertisements now appeared during the show. Allied Domecq, who had sponsored the previous two series of Cold Feet with their Cockburn's Port brand, did not renew their contract with Granada. Granada Ventures negotiated a new sponsorship deal with United Airlines, estimated at £1.5 million. The first two episodes were broadcast as a single two-hour episode on 12 November. Episode 8, featuring Adam and Rachel's wedding, was broadcast on Boxing Day—the first time the show aired on a Tuesday.

== Awards ==
Year	Award	Category	Nominee	Result
2001	British Academy Television Awards 2000	Best Actress	Fay Ripley	Nominated
2001	British Academy Television Craft Awards 2000	New Director Fiction	Jon Jones	Nominated
2001	British Academy Television Craft Awards 2000	New Writer Fiction	David Nicholls	Nominated
2001	British Comedy Awards	Best TV Comedy Drama		Nominated
2001	British Comedy Awards	Best TV Comedy Actor	James Nesbitt	Nominated
2001	British Comedy Awards	Best TV Comedy Actor	John Thomson	Nominated
2001	British Comedy Awards	Best TV Comedy Actress	Hermione Norris	Nominated
2001	British Comedy Awards	People's Choice Award		Won
2001	Royal Television Society Programme Awards	Situation Comedy & Comedy Drama		Nominated
2001	Royal Television Society Craft & Design Awards	Production Design (Drama)	Chris Truelove	Nominated
2001	Royal Television Society Craft & Design Awards	Sound (Drama)	Nick Steer, John Rutherford, Jack Dardis and Andy Wyatt	Nominated
2001	International Emmy Award	Drama		Nominated
2001	Banff Rockie Award	Continuing Series	Episode 6	Nominated
