= Servants (TV series) =

- Genre: Drama
- Written by: Lucy Gannon
- Directed by: Tim Whitby; Hettie Macdonald
- Starring: Joe Absolom; Orla Brady; Christopher Fulford; Kenny Doughty; Felicity Jones; Richard Herring
- Country of origin: United Kingdom
- Original language: English
- No. of series: 1
- No. of episodes: 6

Production
- Producers: Tim Whitby; Harriet Davison

Original release
- Network: BBC One
- Release: 17 April – 15 May 2003

Servants is a British television drama series broadcast by BBC One. It was set in an 1850s English country house and featured Joe Absolom, Orla Brady, Christopher Fulford, Kenny Doughty, Felicity Jones and Richard Herring. The six episode series aired between 17 April and 15 May 2003. Created and written by Lucy Gannon, the series was directed by Tim Whitby and Hettie Macdonald and produced by Whitby and Harriet Davison.

== Characters ==
- Mr Jarvis (Christopher Fulford) - the butler to the Earl of Taplow.
- Andrew Adams (Jon Morrison) - under-butler. A Scotsman, many of the servants dislike him, but fear his fierce temperament.
- William Forrest (Kenny Doughty) - first footman. He is a good-natured rival to George Cosmo. He accidentally kills Lord Harry, an occurrence which later torments him. He develops a fierce enmity with Mr. Adams.
- George Cosmo (Joe Absolom) - second footman. A conman who lies to obtain a position in the Taplow Estate. He continuously bandies for position, though he is almost found out numerous times. He becomes Grace May's love interest.
- Flora Ryan (Orla Brady) - the housekeeper. She secretly loves Mr. Jarvis despite having a rocky relationship with him.
- Grace May (Felicity Jones) - a chamber maid initially in charge of the care of Lord Harry (the deformed son of the Earl of Taplow) until his accidental death. She later holds several different positions in the household. She is the love interest of George Cosmo.
- Earl Taplow (Jeremy Kitcat) - the Earl of Taplow, he is a minor character in the series.
