= Tesco Direct =

Shopping catalogue and website from Tesco

- Website type: Online retailer
- Available in: English
- Owner: Tesco
- Website: www.tesco.com/direct
- Commercial: Yes
- Launched: 2006
- Current status: Closed

Tesco Direct was a shopping catalogue and website operated by the British supermarket chain and retailer Tesco. It was supplying non-food goods such as homeware and consumer products with delivery or in-store collection through collection points in Tesco stores. It was run in competition with Argos and Amazon. Its final catalogue was published and printed in 2012.

Tesco Direct opened in 2006 and ceased trading on 9 July 2018. When it closed it employed around 500 people. Tesco described the loss-making service as having “no route to profitability” when announcing the closure. Citing high costs of marketing and fulfillment for the service as responsible for the failure.
