= Spencer Campbell =

English television producer and director

- Born: 1953 (age 71–72)
- Occupation(s): Television producer Television director
- Years active: 1985–present

Spencer Campbell (born 1953) is an English television producer and director. He is perhaps best known for producing the television series Cold Feet and 4 O'Clock Club, the former of which earned him a BAFTA TV Award in 2002.

== Career ==
Campbell's early credits include working as a researcher in the early 1980s on the Granada Television television magazine Chalkface. At the end of the decade he directed several episodes of The Krypton Factor and the soap opera Coronation Street.

=== The Living Soap ===
One of his most notable works is the BBC television documentary The Living Soap, a year-long series that put a group of students into a purpose-bought house. In a 2000 interview, Campbell noted that the series would have worked better if it had followed an existing group of students in a real house, comparing the situation the participants were put in to Big Brother, but in hindsight would not repeat the experiment: "It was a draining year both for the production team and for the people in the house. We were shooting a week's film and then showing it on TV, which made everything quite fraught." In another interview, he said he "should have chosen other people [...] partly because the people in the house were reluctant participants after a while, and chose quite deliberately not to do things after the initial five or six programmes", referring to one girl who would lock herself in her bedroom when the cameras arrived. In an episode of the 2008 Channel 4 documentary series How TV Changed Britain, Campbell explained how the series pioneered the use of "diary rooms" and public telephone votes long before their use in such series as Big Brother. Reviewing the programme, Thomas Sutcliffe of The Independent said of Campbell's interview, "He now wears the faintly rueful look of a man who invented a better mousetrap, but forgot to put the patent forms in the post."

=== Other work ===
Other credits in the 1990s include producing Jack Dee's Sunday Service, The Grimleys (both the pilot and the series) and the sitcom Sunnyside Farm. In 2000, he became producer of Granada's comedy drama Cold Feet. During his time on the series, Campbell oversaw an increase from six to eight episodes per year, cast Canadian-Australian actress Kimberley Joseph in a lead role when Fay Ripley left during the fourth series, and organised overseas filming in Sydney, Australia. The episode filmed in Australia won Cold Feet the British Academy Television Award for Best Drama Series, which Campbell received along with the writer, Mike Bullen, and the executive producer, Andy Harries.

Following Cold Feet's conclusion in 2003, Campbell produced Donovan, a psychological thriller serial starring Tom Conti, and the comedy drama Christmas Lights and its spin-off Northern Lights, both starring Robson Green and Mark Benton. In 2006, he co-produced Joanne Lees: Murder in the Outback, a dramatisation of the events surrounding the murder of Peter Falconio. Campbell pledged not to deviate from the facts of the case, saying "We've obviously researched it pretty thoroughly, so really it's a story about how difficult it was to bring Murdoch [the killer] to justice." In 2007, he began working for Shed Productions, where he developed Catwalk Dogs, a comedy television film written by Simon Nye and starring Kris Marshall. From 2008 to 2009 he produced two series of Shed Productions' school drama Waterloo Road and in 2009 produced the series Hope Springs. In 2011 he produced Mad Dogs for Left Bank Pictures and Sky1, and for the BBC he produced Blandings (2013).
