= Fay Ripley =

English actress, television presenter, cookbook author

- Born: Fay Ripley; 26 February 1966 (age 60); Wimbledon, London, England
- Education: Guildhall School of Music and Drama (1990)
- Occupations: Actress, recipe author
- Years active: 1990–present
- Spouse: Daniel Lapaine (m. 2001)
- Children: 2

Fay Ripley (born 26 February 1966) is an English actress, television presenter, and recipe author. She is a graduate of the Guildhall School of Music and Drama (1990). Her first professional role was in the chorus of a pantomime version of Around the World in 80 Days. Ripley's early film and television appearances were limited, so she supplemented her earnings by working as a children's entertainer and by selling menswear door-to-door. After her scenes as a prostitute were cut from Frankenstein (1994), Ripley gained her first major film role playing Karen Hughes in Mute Witness (1995).

In 1996, Ripley was cast in her breakthrough role of Jenny Gifford in the ITV series Cold Feet. Initially a supporting role in the pilot episode, Ripley's character was expanded when a series was commissioned in 1998. She stayed with the show for three full series before leaving to take more varied roles and to spend more time with her family. She returned for a guest appearance in the fifth series.

After leaving Cold Feet, Ripley played a succession of leading roles in comedies and dramas including Green-Eyed Monster (2001), I Saw You (2002), The Stretford Wives (2002), and Dead Gorgeous (2002). Each role won her critical acclaim. In 2006, she filmed a leading role in the ITV drama Bon Voyage, before taking time away from acting after the birth of her second child. Ripley returned to television in 2009, starring as human resources manager Christine Frances in the ITV comedy drama Monday Monday, and Nicola Perrin alongside Martin Clunes in BBC One's Reggie Perrin.

Since 2009, Ripley has authored three recipe books; Fay's Family Food in 2009, What's for Dinner? in 2012 and Fay Makes it Easy in 2014. She is married to actor Daniel Lapaine, with whom she has two children—a daughter and a son—and is an advocate of several charities and causes.

== Early life ==
Ripley was born in Wimbledon, southwest London to Bev(erley) William Deacon Ripley and Tina Ripley (née Forster) on 26 February 1966. Her father was a successful businessman – the son of Greater London Councilman Sydney William Leonard Ripley, J.P., D.L., whose family had owned a printing company that produced movie posters - and brother of 1960s pop singer Twinkle, and her mother an antiques dealer. They separated when Ripley was two years old and both remarried, so Ripley spent her childhood moving around Surrey between two families.

She was the only child from her parents' marriage but had several half-brothers and sisters from their new relationships. In her early life, she lived in various Surrey towns, including Walton-on-Thames, Weybridge, Esher and Cobham. Her father wanted her to have a good education so, despite the family's Protestant religion, sent her to various Catholic convent schools around the county. One was St Maur's Convent School in Weybridge, which she attended with Liza Tarbuck. Ripley did not feel academically challenged there, and later declared the school mediocre.

At school, Ripley enjoyed drama lessons, spurred on by the positive remarks she received from her drama teacher Susan Ford. She said of Ford, "When I was 15, one of the few people who said, 'Well done', was my drama teacher, and she was really brilliant. She was a powerful woman. Those women change your life. You always remember them. There was something about her. She basically made me feel very good about myself as a 15-year-old girl." Abandoning her childhood ambition to become a nurse, Ripley decided to go into acting.

Her father wanted to send her to a finishing school in Switzerland but, in an effort to rebel from her middle class Home Counties background, Ripley instead went to a local state college in Surrey, where she took A-levels in communication studies, art, and drama. During her time at the college, Ripley performed her own small shows at the Edinburgh Festival Fringe. In an effort to "bring Brecht to the masses", she performed The Resistible Rise of Arturo Ui at the 1983 festival.

After completing her A-levels, Ripley sought entry to the Guildhall School of Music and Drama. It took her three attempts before she was accepted onto an acting course at the age of 20. While at drama school, Ripley lived in a flat in Streatham, south London, during a time she described as "horrible and penniless". To support herself financially, she sold menswear door-to-door, timeshares on Kensington High Street and Oxford Street, worked as a receptionist at a health club, and spent five years as children's entertainer "Miss Chief the Clown". As Miss Chief, Ripley performed magic tricks and painted faces at children's parties. The work paid off when she was able to get a mortgage on her first flat, stating clown as her occupation.

== Career ==
=== Early career ===
Ripley graduated from drama school in 1990. Her first role afterwards was playing Osatko in the chorus of Around the World in 80 Days at the Liverpool Playhouse during the 1990–1991 pantomime season. She had ten lines in Japanese. Her next role came at the end of the year in the Manchester Royal Exchange's production of Medea. Ripley recalled, "It was only my second job, and I took it all very seriously, in my Greek sarong and my torch of fire, having to burble in tongues."

Ripley's early television and film career was characterised by minor roles as prostitutes or mistresses; for her first film appearance she filmed two scenes as a prostitute in Frankenstein (1994), directed by Kenneth Branagh. In the first scene, her character was strangled by the creature (played by Robert De Niro's stand-in). The second scene featured De Niro himself, though Ripley's character was lying dead in a mortuary throughout. Pleased with what looked like her breakout role, Ripley bought a dress for the premiere, though she was distraught when Branagh sent her a card apologising for cutting her scenes from the finished film.

The same year, she filmed the role of Karen Hughes, the sister of a mute character who believes she sees a murder, in the low-budget film Mute Witness (1995), directed by Anthony Waller. After Mute Witness's British television premiere in 1999, a Daily Record critic wrote that Ripley's dramatic scenes were not as good as her comic ones. In 1995, she appeared in an episode of Channel 4's Alan Davies vehicle One for the Road and made her last theatre appearance for almost thirty years as a cast member in the Bush Theatre's Two Lips, Indifferent Red.

In 1996, she had a role in Stephen Poliakoff's Frontiers, and played a club barmaid in Dennis Potter's penultimate television series Karaoke. The following year she had roles in the comedy film Roseanna's Grave (Paul Weiland, 1997), an episode of The Bill—as a woman whose nanny is accused of stealing from her—and a two-part episode of the Kevin Whately series The Broker's Man as a police officer. Her role in The Broker's Man was one of the few occasions on which Ripley played a police officer; she has frequently declined offers of similar roles because she does not want to "summon up the misery" to play a character that performs post-mortem examinations or investigates murders when she could be starring in more true to life and funny programmes.

=== Breakthrough roles ===
In 1996, Ripley auditioned for Granada Television's Cold Feet, a television pilot about the romances of three couples living in Manchester. She believed she was reading for the role of Rachel, the "young, pretty one", and was surprised to discover that she was wanted for Jenny, the "northern housewife". In the audition, she performed with an inelegant approximation of a local Manchester accent. The producers found her approach to the role refreshing from other actresses, who were seen as too "finger-wagging". Ripley won the role, and appeared opposite John Thomson and James Nesbitt in the programme. After the pilot won an award, ITV's director of programmes commissioned a series of Cold Feet, so Ripley worked on improving her character's accent by speaking to locals and mimicking their speech. Her supporting character from the pilot episode was given a bigger role in the series; in the first episode (broadcast in 1998), Jenny gives birth to her first child. At that time, Ripley had never experienced childbirth, so copied birth scenes she had seen in other television series. An Independent review of the first series in November 1998 noted, "Fay Ripley has a range of quirky mannerisms that are more reminiscent of Elaine in Seinfeld than of any other Brit-com woman."

Ripley's performance in the first series won her a nomination for Best TV Comedy Actress at the British Comedy Awards 1999. For her performance in the third series (2000), in which her character separates from her husband and dates another man (played by Ben Miles), she was nominated for the British Academy Television Award for Best Actress. During pre-production of the fourth series (2001), Ripley announced to the producers that she would be leaving the show, partly because she did not want to spend five months living in Manchester away from her home in London and wanted to spend more time with her husband, and partly to take other roles which she would otherwise not be able to do. She asked the writer Mike Bullen to either kill off Jenny or have her lose a limb. Bullen refused and instead wrote a plot in which Jenny moves to New York. Ripley returned to the series for a guest appearance in the final episode (2003).

In 2000, Ripley appeared in the British dogme film The Announcement, as well as playing lead female character Grace Bingley—opposite Paul Rhys—in the Granada television pilot I Saw You, which used many of the same production staff as Cold Feet. David Belcher of The Herald called Ripley "perfectly scatty, tousled and self-sufficient" in the role, and Joe Joseph of The Times complimented her comic timing. Ripley returned to I Saw You for a three-episode miniseries in 2002. She considers I Saw You, in which she acted alongside her husband Daniel Lapaine, the television show she is most proud to have worked on.

=== Further projects ===
Having left Cold Feet, Ripley began to take on more leading roles; her first role was as housewife Deanna in the BBC thriller The Green-Eyed Monster, which was broadcast in September 2001. She researched her character, a murderer, by visiting a coroner. Guardian critic Gareth McLean wrote of her performance, "Ripley did a good job of exorcising the ghost of Jenny Gifford [...] by coolly cranking up the insane desperation and needy malevolence to an impressive degree." In 2002, she played domestic abuse victim Donna Massey in Danny Brocklehurst's The Stretford Wives. Ripley was initially not eager to play another character from around Manchester so soon after leaving Cold Feet, but she changed her mind after reading the script. She did not research spousal abuse to play her character, a woman struggling to bring up her two children in a run-down house while her husband is imprisoned, because she did not find it difficult to "work out what it's like to be scared and want to protect your kids".

Also in 2002, Ripley played Rose Bell in the ITV post-war period drama Dead Gorgeous, alongside Helen McCrory. The following year, she provided the voice of Meg in the ITV adaptation of the Meg and Mog children's books, before playing Jill in the third series of the BBC One sitcom Bedtime at the end of 2003. In 2004, Ripley had her first of three on-screen partnerships with Martin Clunes, playing Jane White in the CBBC adaptation of Fungus the Bogeyman. The following year, she played the guest role of corrupt police inspector Sam Phillips in the BBC TV series Hustle, a role that received praise from The Times.

In 2006, Ripley played the role of child abductor Linda Holder in the two-part ITV drama Bon Voyage, starring alongside Ben Miles, Rachael Blake and Daniel Ryan. She was offered the part without having to audition, and took it because she wanted the opportunity to play an antagonist. She liked the style of Canadian director John Fawcett in making the thriller, as it differed to that of other British thrillers, which she believed were poorly filmed. Ripley filmed the role in Canada during the later weeks of her second pregnancy, so her character was dressed in baggy clothes to hide her bump. Her pregnancy also caused changes to the script; originally her character was to run through a forest, fall off a cliff and "die a gruesome death". Reviewing, Thomas Sutcliffe of The Independent and Gareth McLean of The Guardian noted that Ripley's pregnancy was poorly disguised. In complimenting the performance of the whole cast, Brian McIver of the Daily Record praised Ripley's portrayal of Linda as "scary but sympathetic".

Bon Voyage marked Ripley's last television acting appearance until 2009. During that time she appeared as a guest on panel shows and talk shows. In 2009, she returned to television screens as Nicola Perrin alongside Martin Clunes' eponymous character in the BBC One sitcom Reggie Perrin. She took the role because she had previously worked with Clunes and the writer Simon Nye. As the series was Ripley's first studio sitcom, she approached the role with apprehension; she told The Independent on Sunday, "I basically just hung off Martin's coat-tails and hoped for the best." Ripley compared Nicola to Reggie's house-bound wife Elizabeth in the original series, noting that the modern character needed a job and independence from her husband because of changes in society. She reprised the role in the second series in 2010, after which the series was cancelled.

2009 also saw the broadcast of Monday Monday, an ITV comedy drama series in which Ripley plays Christine Frances, an alcoholic human resources manager at a supermarket head office that moves from London to Leeds. She took the role because it was different to characters she had previously played.

=== Other work ===
During her time on Cold Feet, Ripley hosted the Channel 4 show Sofa Melt, a relationships chat show in the vein of Trisha. The show lasted for one series of 60 episodes, broadcast in 1999. In Scotland on Sunday, critic Stewart Hennessey called Ripley's presenting fantastic and called the show itself "utterly without any intelligent merit whatsoever. It is just unmissable because the people on it are hilariously stupid. Set the vid, show it at parties." Ripley said of the show retrospectively, "It was the most terrifying thing I've ever done." In 2003, she presented a short film advocating Harry Potter and the Goblet of Fire for the BBC's Big Read series and in 2009, she presented an episode of the Blighty documentary series My Brilliant Britain.

In 2004, she appeared on the Star in a Reasonably Priced Car segment of Top Gear, where she discussed her car history with presenter Jeremy Clarkson. On her celebrity lap of the Top Gear test track, she achieved a lap time of 1:53, making her 38th on the Suzuki Liana leader board. The same year, she participated in a major advertising venture by The National Lottery, playing "Lady Luck" alongside a unicorn voiced by Graham Norton. In 2008, she appeared alongside Martin Clunes in a series of advertisements for Tesco Direct and, since 2009, has starred with Mark Addy in a series of adverts for Tesco's various brands.

In 2007, Ripley announced that she would be writing a cookbook about family food. She said, "I want to help people prepare good food for their kids, really practical stuff that's easy, quick, healthy and you can whizz up in the blender for the baby." Fay's Family Food was published by Michael Joseph, an imprint of Penguin Books, in April 2009 and was selected by Marie-Claire Digby of The Irish Times as a "summer read". Ripley's second book, entitled What's For Dinner, was published in April 2012. Since the release of her first book, she has resisted offers from television production companies to make her own cookery series. In November 2016, Ripley guest presented an episode of The One Show with Alex Jones. She guest presented an episode with Angela Scanlon in January 2017. Ripley currently narrates Grime & Punishment on C5.

In late 2022, Ripley made a return to the stage with The National Theatre's production of Kerry Jackson, in which she played the eponymous lead role.

== Personal life ==
Ripley met English actor James Purefoy when the two were starring in the eponymous roles in a college production of Romeo and Juliet in 1983. They began an 11-year relationship that ended when Ripley was 27. She was single for five years, before being introduced to Australian actor Daniel Lapaine at a party hosted by mutual friends. Neither of them thought the other was interested in dating and they drifted apart.

After meeting again on separate holidays in New York, they began dating and married in October 2001 in a ceremony in Tuscany, Italy. Ripley gave birth to the couple's first child, daughter Parker, in October 2002. She gave birth to son Sonny in October 2006.

Ripley is a patron of several charities and causes. In 2007 she took part in What's it going to take?, a campaign by Women's Aid to raise awareness of domestic abuse against women. She visited Tanzania with ActionAid in October 2008 to raise awareness of child sponsorship. While in the country, Ripley visited community projects set up by ActionAid in Bagamoyo and Mkuranga. Ripley was already sponsoring a child and had been asked by ActionAid to participate in a visit but had always declined because of conflicts with her work.

Ripley also fronted a "Climate Action Now" protest with novelist Rebecca Frayn and actress Rula Lenska in 2008, opposing government support of the then planned third runway at Heathrow Airport. She is the cousin of former England footballer, Stuart Ripley.

== Filmography ==
Film and TV
Year(s)	Title	Role	Description
1995	Mute Witness	Karen Hughes	Feature film
1995	Rumble	Marissa	1 episode of television series: Episode 4
1995	One for the Road	Jane	1 episode of television series: "Overdraft"
1996	Karaoke	Club Barmaid	2 episodes of television serial: "Tuesday"; "Friday"
1996	Frontiers	Elizabeth Kirsten	Television mini-series
1997	Comedy Premieres: Cold Feet	Jenny Gifford	Television pilot
1997	The Bill	Rose Milne	1 episode of television series: "Black and Blue"
1997	The Broker's Man	DS Wendy Atkins	2 episodes of television series: "Dangerous Bends Part 1"; "Dangerous Bends Part 2"
1997	Roseanna's Grave	Francesca	Feature film
1998	How Do You Want Me?	Sophie	1 episode of television series: "Woof"
1998–2001, 2003, 2016–2020	Cold Feet	Jenny Gifford	All 9 series
1999	Sofa Melt	Host	Television chat show
2000	I Saw You	Grace Bingley	Television pilot
2000	The Announcement	Alex	Feature film
2001	The Green-Eyed Monster	Deanna	Television film
2002	I Saw You	Grace Bingley	Television series
2002	The Stretford Wives	Donna Massey	Television film
2002	Dead Gorgeous	Rose Bell	Television film
2003	Meg and Mog	Meg (voice)	Television series
2003	Bedtime	Jill	1 series of television series
2004	Fungus the Bogeyman	Jane White	Television film
2005	Hustle	Sam Phillips	1 episode of television series: "Missions"
2006	Bon Voyage	Linda Holder	2-part television film
2009–2010	Reggie Perrin	Nicola Perrin	2 series of television series
2009	My Brilliant Britain	Presenter	1 episode of television series: Series 1, Episode 10
2009	Monday Monday	Christine Frances	1 series of television series
2009	New Tricks	Anna Greening	1 episode of television series: "The War Against Drugs"
2011	Moving On	Ann Murphy	1 episode of television series: "Poetry of Silence"
2013	Midsomer Murders	Caroline Potts	1 episode of television series: "The Sicilian Defence"
2014–2015	Suspects	DI Martha Bellamy	4 series
2015	Burger Bar to Gourmet Star	Herself, narrator	Channel 4 factual series
2015	The Delivery Man	Caitlin	Six-part comedy series
2016–2017	The One Show	Herself, guest presenter	3 episodes
2017	Dragons' Den: Meet the New Dragons	Narrator	One-off episode
2022	Rosie Jones' Trip Hazard	Herself	One-off episode
2024	Finders Keepers	Anne	Four-part drama
2025	DNA Journey	Herself	One episode with Hermione Norris
2026	Celebrity Sabotage	Herself	1 episode

== Bibliography ==
- Ripley, Fay (2009). Fay's Family Food. London: Michael Joseph. ISBN 0-7181-5460-6.
- Ripley, Fay (2012). What's for Dinner?. London: Collins. ISBN 0-00-744532-6.
- Ripley, Fay (2014). Fay Makes it Easy. London: HarperCollins ISBN 0007543166.
