= Tim Whitby =

British screenwriter, television producer and director

Tim Whitby is a British screenwriter, television producer and director. His works include the 2003 costume drama Servants, the ITV drama series Cold Feet, the BBC drama The Indian Doctor and the comedy series Mine All Mine. Single dramas "The Best of Men" and "In Love with Barbara" He was also a producer on Bramwell "Our Girl" Gap year" and Tripping Over.

Whitby featured as the producer of the final series of Shameless taking over from Ed McCardie. Whitby has directed four episodes of the series.
