= Sheltered housing =

Housing providing social support for residents

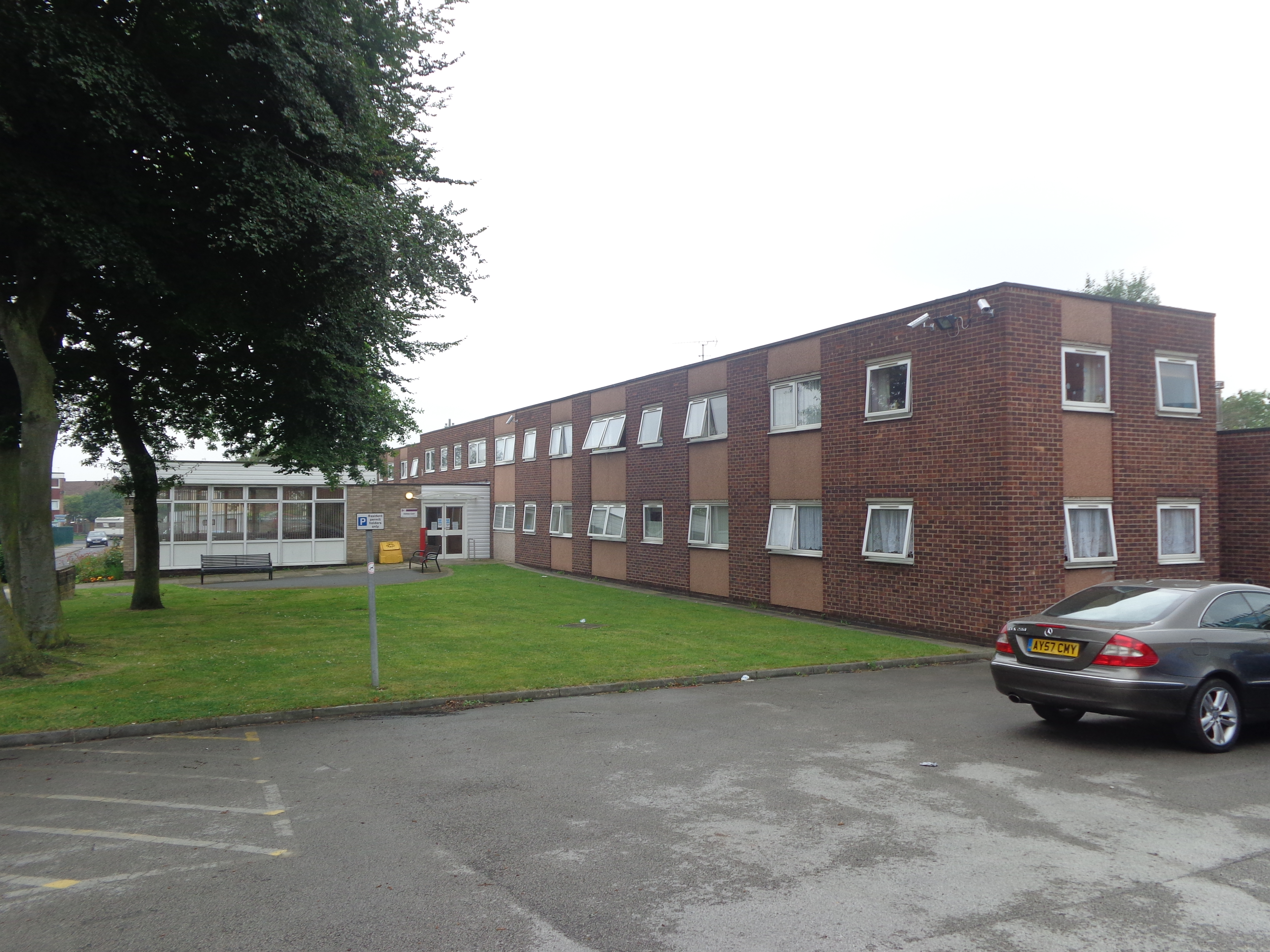
Halliday Court sheltered housing in Garforth, West Yorkshire

Sheltered housing or sheltered accommodation are terms covering a wide range of rented housing for older and/or disabled or other vulnerable people.

In the United Kingdom most commonly it refers to grouped housing such as a block or "scheme" of flats or bungalows with a scheme manager or "officer"; traditionally the manager has lived on-site although this is not always the case these days. Managers/officers used to be called "wardens" but this term is now felt to be out of date. Sheltered housing schemes in the UK are generally owned, run and maintained as social housing by a local authority or housing association.

== Accommodation ==
Sheltered housing is self-contained and easy to manage, ranging from a simple bedsit to a large flat or small house. Such schemes are distinct from a nursing home or care home in that the tenants are usually able to look after themselves, are active and are afforded a degree of independence; equally, sheltered housing differs from a retirement community which is generally leasehold (owner-occupied).

Many schemes have communal areas such as a lounge and/or garden where tenants can socialise. Many sheltered housing schemes are open only to people aged 60 or over although some accept people from the age of 55. This age restriction however is changing as the deciding factors in offering potential residents accommodation is being widened in recognition of the idea that being vulnerable and in need of support is not always age related. There is generally no upper age limit, the deciding factor instead being whether the person is independent enough to look after themselves or if they need care. A number of housing associations are now considering the rising need for this type of accommodation and are adding suitable accommodation in plans for their new social housing developments. Many of these developments are entitled to apply for funding from local governments to provide suitable housing for the more vulnerable members of the community.

== Other types ==
Extra care sheltered housing (a.k.a. "very sheltered" or "assisted living") schemes provide a greater level of access and mobility for frail older people, with a domiciliary care service and personal care element being available within the scheme alongside the manager. In addition meals are usually provided and as they are eaten in the communal dining room it provides an opportunity for social interaction and combats loneliness.

== See also ==
- Assisted living
- Group home
