= Ciarán Donnelly (director) =

Irish film and television director

Ciarán Donnelly is an Irish film and television director. He is primarily known for his direction of major international series such as Camelot, The Tudors, Titanic: Blood and Steel and Vikings.

His work includes four episodes of the ITV comedy drama series Cold Feet (including the episode that won the series the Best Drama Series BAFTA), the crime drama series Donovan, the BBC One drama Spooks and the 2016 Discovery Channel historical miniseries Harley and the Davidsons. His 2006 serial Stardust won the IFTA for Best Single Drama/Drama Serial. He was a co-creator (with Peter McKenna) of the Irish television series Kin. The series was born from a development process of about three years between McKenna, Donnelly and the Canadian studio Bron Studios, and it was broadcast on RTÉ One.

Since 2006, he has been a lead director on the Irish/Canadian series The Tudors, for which he won another IFTA in 2009. In 2010, he was nominated for another IFTA for his work on the third season. He garnered yet another IFTA nomination in 2013 for Titanic: Blood and Steel. In february 2022 it was announced that Donnelly was nominated once more for an IFTA for his work on The Wheel of Time.

== Filmography ==
Year	Name	Notes
1991	Bound for Manhattan	Short; Also screenwriter and editor
1996	Dirty Old Town	Short
1997	Pinned	Short
1998	The Split	TV movie
2001-2003	Cold Feet	4 episodes
2003	Spooks	2 episodes
2004	Proof	4 episodes
2005	Big Dippers	TV movie
2006	Stardust	2 episodes
2006	Donovan	1 episode
2007	Robin Hood	3 episodes
2007-2010	The Tudors	13 episodes
2008-2009	Inspector George Gently	4 episodes
2009	Trust Me	Episode 'Promises, Promises'
2011	Camelot	2 episodes
2012	Titanic: Blood and Steel	12 episodes Also executive producer (12 episodes) and stories writer (3 episodes)
2013	Once Upon a Time	Episode 'Ariel'
2013	Once Upon a Time in Wonderland	Episode 'Bad Blood'
2013-2019	Vikings	15 episodes Also second unit director in episode 'Ragnarok'
2014	Crossbones	2 episodes Also executive producer (9 episodes)
2015	A.D. The Bible Continues	3 episodes
2015	Tyrant	Episode 'Desert Storm'
2015	The Bastard Executioner	2 episodes
2016	Harley and the Davidsons	2 episodes Also executive producer (3 episodes)
2018	Krypton	3 episodes Also co-executive producer (2 episodes)
2019	Altered Carbon	2 episodes
2021-2025	The Wheel of Time	6 episodes

Also second unit director in Peaches (2000).
