= List of television programmes set, produced or filmed in Manchester =

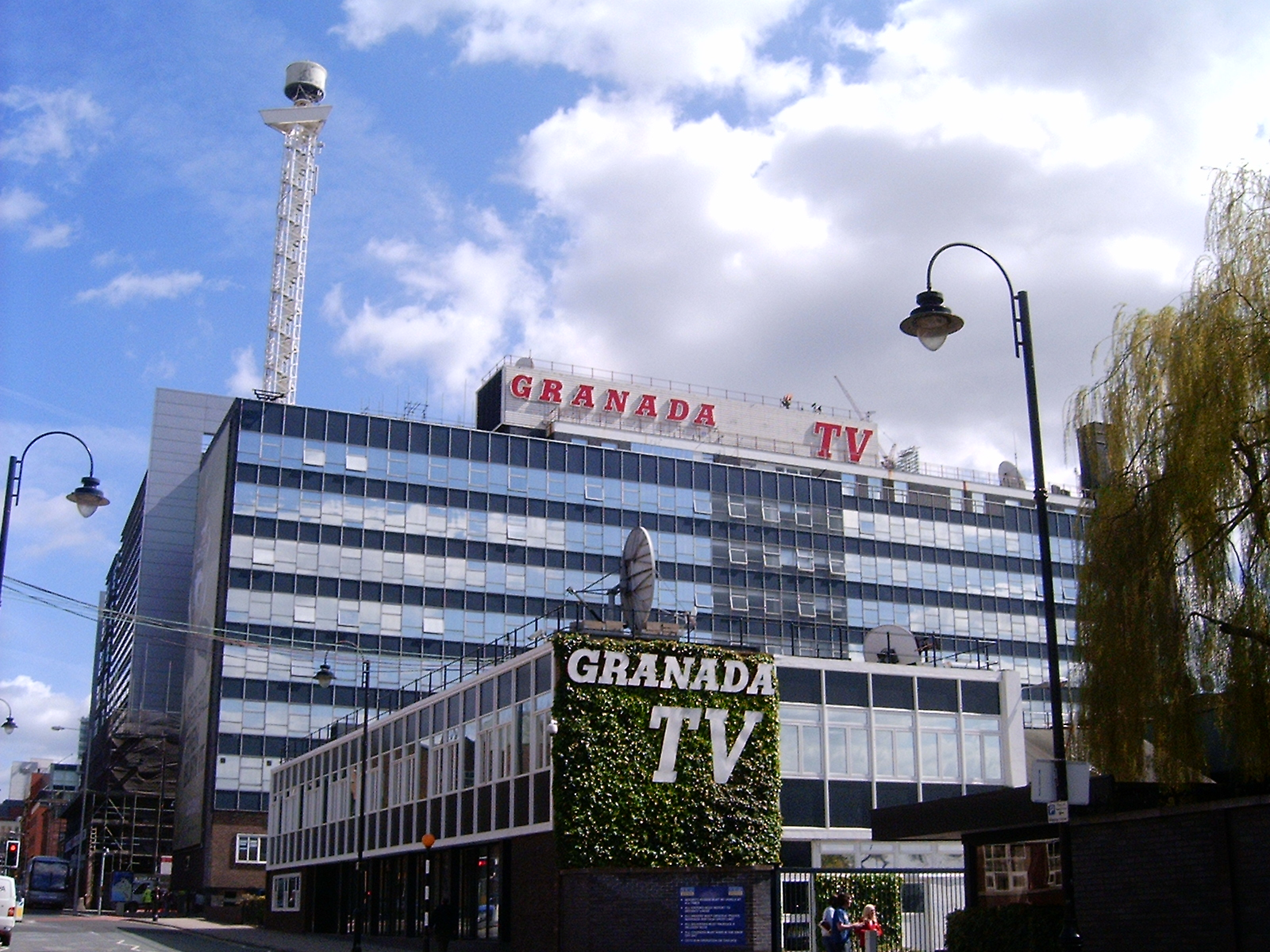
Granada Studios, former home to Granada Television - the most successful ITV franchise and one of the most successful British television production companies

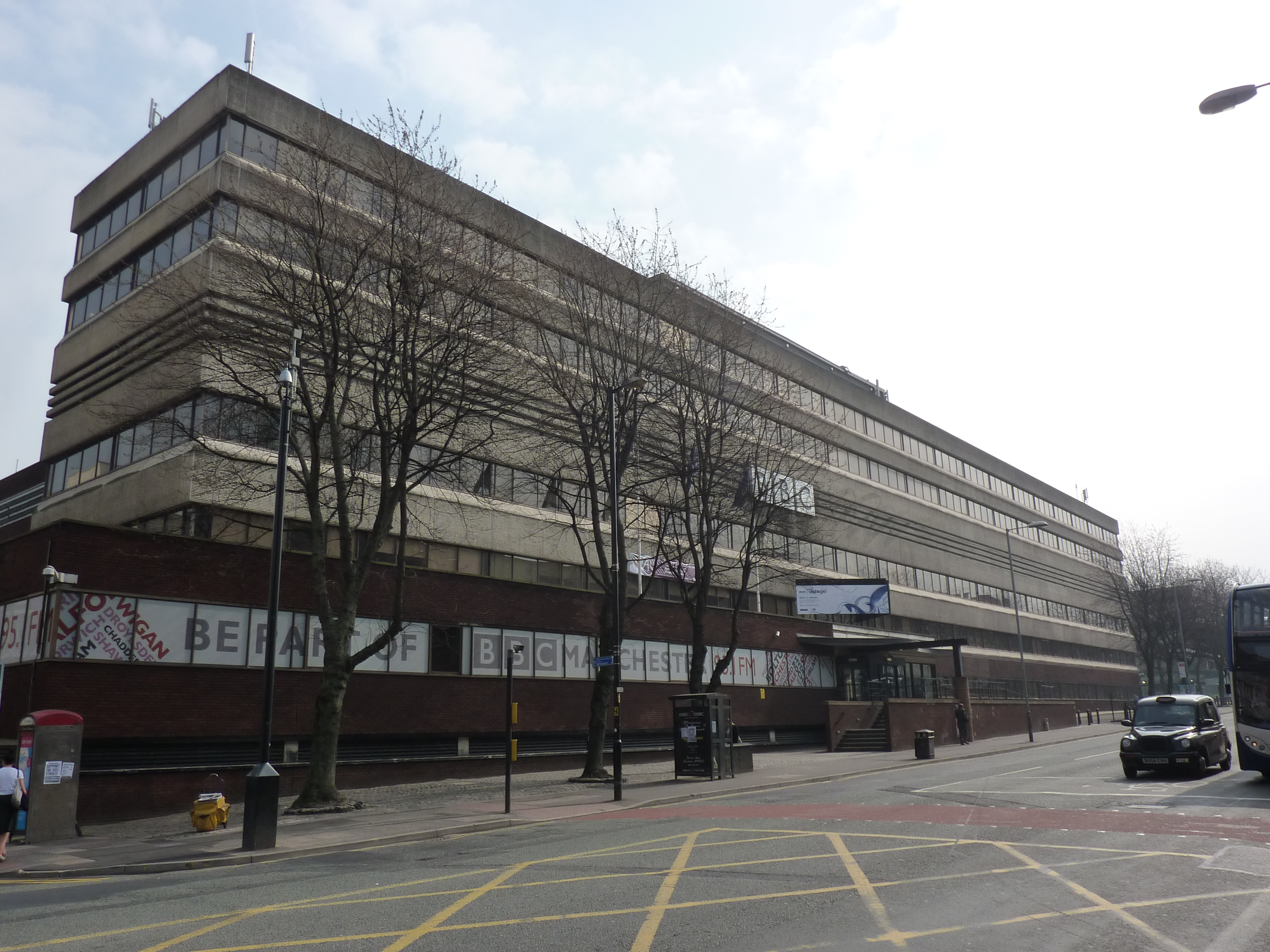
New Broadcasting House on Oxford Road, former home of BBC Manchester, now demolished

The City of Manchester and its surrounding area has a strong heritage for television broadcasting. The city is home to the oldest television studios in the UK and the most successful ITV franchisee, Granada Television. Manchester's most famous television exports include Coronation Street, Seven Up!, Songs of Praise, University Challenge, A Question of Sport and Mastermind - all of which are still broadcasting to large audiences today. Granada's productions gradually waned in the 2000s, but it is hoped the BBC move to Salford Quays in 2011 will spawn a new era of television broadcasting in the area. Manchester also has a high correlation of successful television drama series, with many being produced and filmed in Manchester and the surrounding areas.

Television broadcasting in Manchester is currently undergoing a major transition with the famous Granada Studios and New Broadcasting House being demolished by 2013 to be replaced by MediaCityUK and The Sharp Project. Both the BBC and ITV have promised to invest more in the North and Manchester will be the base for these operations. MediaCityUK, located two miles from Manchester City Centre, will act as a new second home for the BBC and ITV away from London.

This is a list of television programmes that are/were either set, produced or filmed in Manchester. The Media in Manchester page provides a more in depth look at the history of broadcasting and media in Manchester.

== Background ==
The city has had a long heritage of producing programmes at various studios, most notably at ITV's Granada Studios and the BBC's New Broadcasting House. Dock10 studios is located in MediaCityUK, Salford Quays, a couple of miles (about three kilometres) outside Manchester city centre. The Studios at Dock10 is now home to BBC North and ITV Granada since 2013, along with other departments transferred north.

Most television programmes produced in Manchester have been done so by Granada Television, the most successful ITV franchisee who are based at Granada Studios in Manchester. The BBC through BBC North also have a key influence in Manchester and the corporation sees Manchester along with Bristol and London as its main broadcasting centres.

== Productions in Manchester ==
Manchester has two main production units in Granada Television at Granada Studios and BBC Manchester at New Broadcasting House and both share a joint venture in 3SixtyMedia. Smaller Manchester based production companies such as Red Production Company and more recently RSJ Films led by writer Jimmy McGovern have consistently used Manchester and north as a background for drama.

Manchester has been used as a setting for many TV programmes with its industrial past, quirky cultural modern atmosphere or working roots. Some programmes are set in Manchester but weren't filmed or produced there, as in the case of Father & Son, a 2010 drama which was broadcast on ITV.

Programme	Year	Production	Broadcaster	Notes
What the Papers Say	1956–2008	Granada Television	ITV/Channel 4/BBC Two	Produced at Granada Studios. Became the first programme made by an ITV company for the BBC (Continues as a Radio Broadcast on BBC Radio 4).
The Army Game	1957–61	Granada Television	ITV	
Criss Cross Quiz	1957–67	Granada Television	ITV	
Concentration	1959–60	Granada Television	ITV	
Biggles	1960	Granada Television	ITV	Produced at Granada Studios
All Our Yesterdays	1960–73, 1987–89	Granada Television	ITV	
Coronation Street	1960–present	Granada Television	ITV	Filmed in at MediaCityUK in Salford. Longest running serial TV soap drama in the world
Songs of Praise	1961–present	BBC Religion and Ethics (BBC Manchester)	BBC One	Produced at New Broadcasting House at BBC Manchester
Take a Letter	1962–64	Granada Television	ITV	
The Odd Man	1962–67	Granada Television	ITV	
University Challenge	1962–87, 1994–present	Granada Television	ITV/BBC Two	Broadcast from Granada Studios
World in Action	1963–98	Granada Television	ITV	Hard-hitting and controversial programme on current affairs. Often featured investigative journalism. Produced at Granada Studios
Top of the Pops	1964–67	BBC North (BBC Manchester)	BBC One	First three series filmed at disused church in Rusholme, Manchester before being considered a "hit", after which it moved to the BBC Television Centre
Up series	1964–2019	Granada Television	ITV/BBC One	Longest running documentary series in the world, listed as one of the Greatest British documentaries in 2005 poll by Channel 4, listed as one of the great movies by critic Roger Ebert
Pardon the Expression	1965–67	Granada Television	ITV	Spin-off of Coronation Street
The Corridor People	1966	Granada Television	ITV	
Turn Out the Lights	1967	Granada Television	ITV	
The Caesars	1968	Granada Television	ITV	
Spindoe	1968	Granada Television	ITV	
Nearest and Dearest	1968–73	Granada Television	ITV	
The Dustbinmen	1969–70	Granada Television	ITV	Produced by Granada
The Lovers	1970–71	Granada Television	ITV	
A Family at War	1970–72	Granada Television	ITV	
Play for Today; Comedians	1970–84	BBC	BBC	
Screen Test	1970–84	BBC Manchester	BBC One	Filmed at New Broadcasting House
The Comedians	1971–93	Granada Television	ITV	
Clapperboard	1972–82	Granada Television	ITV	
Crown Court	1972–84	Granada Television	ITV	
It's a Knockout	1972–88	BBC North	BBC One	Came to prominence under BBC Manchester's lead and Stuart Hall's presenting and in 1972. Viewing figures soon reached over 15 million compared to the lowly 100,000 the show got pre-1972
A Question of Sport	1972–2023	BBC North (BBC Manchester)	BBC One	Originally produced at New Broadcasting House, but transferred to Granada Studios in 2000 and split production between Manchester and BBC Television Centre. Transferred again to Dock10, MediaCityUK in late 2012.
Sam	1973–75	Granada Television	ITV	
The Nearly Man	1974	Granada Television	ITV	
The Wheeltappers and Shunters Social Club	1974–77	Granada Television	ITV	
Shang-a-Lang	1975	Granada Television	ITV	
The Cuckoo Waltz	1975–77, 1980	Granada Television	ITV	
Arrows	1976–77	Granada Television	ITV	
So It Goes	1976–77	Granada Television	ITV	
The Krypton Factor	1977–95, 2009	Granada Television	ITV	Produced and recorded at the Granada Studios for both original and 2009 revival series in 2009. The 2010 revival series was recorded at The London Studios.
Leave it to Charlie	1978-80	Granada Television	ITV	Interior shots filmed at Granada Studios.
Strangers	1978–82	Granada Television	ITV	
Cheggers Plays Pop	1978–86	BBC Manchester	BBC One	Filmed at New Broadcasting House
Brideshead Revisited	1981	Granada Television	ITV	
Wood and Walters	1981–82	Granada Television	ITV	
Oxford Road Show	1981–85	BBC Manchester	BBC One	Broadcast at New Broadcasting House
The Jewel in the Crown	1984	Granada Television	ITV	
Travelling Man	1984	Granada Television	ITV	Set and filmed in Manchester
The Wind in the Willows	1984-90	Cosgrove Hall Productions and Thames Television	ITV	
Sherlock Holmes	1984–94	Granada Television	ITV	
Albion Market	1985–86	Granada Television	ITV	A planned companion soap for Coronation Street but was met with indifference and cancelled after a year
The Practice	1985–86	Granada Television	ITV	Produced, filmed and set in Manchester.
Connections	1985–90	Granada Television	ITV	Produced and filmed at Granada Studios
Busman's Holiday	1985–93	Granada Television	ITV	
Lost Empires	1986	Granada Television	ITV	Produced by Granada in Manchester.
Fax	1986–88	BBC Manchester	BBC One	Recorded at New Broadcasting House
Open Air	1986–90	BBC North	BBC One	Filmed at New Broadcasting House
Runway	1987–93	Granada Television	ITV	Produced and filmed at Granada Studios
Watching	1987–93	Granada Television	ITV	Produced by Granada in Manchester.
Red Dwarf	1988–89	BBC North West	BBC Two	Produced by BBC North West at New Broadcasting House for the first three series before moving to Shepperton Studios
The Hit Man and Her	1988–92	Granada Television	ITV	Produced by Granada Television
Making Out	1989–91	BBC Manchester	BBC One	
Surgical Spirit	1989–95	Granada Television	ITV	Produced at Granada in Manchester. The programme was set at an anonymous location.
That's Showbusiness	1989–96	BBC North	BBC One	Filmed at New Broadcasting House
Children's Ward	1989–2000	Granada Television	ITV	Location filming at Bolton Royal Hospital with indoor scenes recorded at Granada Studios
The 8:15 from Manchester	1990–91	BBC	BBC One	Broadcast from New Broadcasting House
Cluedo	1990–93	Granada Television	ITV	Produced by Granada Television
Jeeves and Wooster	1990–93	Granada Television	ITV	
Stars in Their Eyes	1990–2006	Granada Television	ITV	Recorded at Granada Studios
You've Been Framed!	1990–2022	Granada Television/ITV Studios	ITV	
Prime Suspect	1991–2006	Granada Television	ITV	Series was produced by Granada Television in Manchester and set in London with the exception of series 5 which was set in Manchester
Going for Gold	1993–96	Reg Grundy Productions	BBC One	Originally recorded at BBC Television Centre for the first series and BBC Elstree Centre for series 2, 3, 4, 5 and 6 before being transferred to New Broadcasting House.
Cracker	1993–96, 2006	Granada Television	ITV	
Turnabout	1993–96	Turnabout Productions	BBC One	Originally recorded at Ewart TV Studios for the first three series before being transferred to New Broadcasting House.
Sooty and Co.	1993–98	Granada Television	ITV	
Common As Muck	1994–97	BBC	BBC One	Filmed in parts of Manchester
The Mrs Merton Show	1994–98	Granada Television	BBC One	Recorded at Granada Studios
The Perfect Match	1995	Granada Television	ITV	Written by Mike Bullen who later wrote Cold Feet
Band of Gold	1995–97	Granada Television	ITV	
Lucky Numbers	1995–97	Granada Television	ITV	
The Sunday Show	1995–97	BBC North	BBC Two	Broadcast from New Broadcasting House
Carnal Knowledge	1996	Rapido TV/Granada Television	ITV	
Hillsborough	1996	Granada Television	ITV	Docu-drama produced by Granada in Manchester. Voted #54 in BFI 100 Greatest British Television Programmes in 2000.
God's Gift	1996–98	Granada Television	ITV	
Reckless	1997	Granada Television	ITV	Set in Manchester and London
Waffle	1998	Granada Television	ITV	
Dinnerladies	1998–2000	Good News/Pozzitive Television	BBC One	Set in Manchester but produced and filmed at BBC Television Centre
Pass the Buck	1998–2000	Zenith/BBC Manchester	BBC One	Originally recorded at New Broadcasting House for the first series before being transferred to Granada Studios.
Cold Feet	1998–2003	Granada Television	ITV	Filmed and set in Manchester. Won over 20 major awards in its 5 series
Wipeout	1998–2003	Action Time/BBC Manchester	BBC One	The Bob Monkhouse episodes were originally recorded from Studio A at New Broadcasting House before moving to Granada Studios.
The Heaven and Earth Show	1998–2007	BBC One	BBC Religion and Ethics (based at BBC Manchester)	Broadcast from both New Broadcasting House and later from Granada Studios
The Royle Family	1998–2012	Granada Television	BBC Two/BBC One	Produced, set and filmed in Stockport at Vector Television, although later series were filmed at Ealing Studios and more recent episodes have been filmed at The Pie Factory, in MediaCityUK.
The Last Train	1999	Granada Television	ITV	Produced in Manchester by Granada
Sex, Chips & Rock n' Roll	1999	BBC Drama		Set and filmed in various places around Greater Manchester including the City of Manchester
Queer as Folk	1999–2000	Red Production Company		
Loose Women	1999–present	Granada Television/ITV Studios	ITV	Originally broadcast from Granada Studios but moved to Anglia Television and later The London Studios.
Tonight	1999–present	Granada Television/ITV Studios	ITV	
Clocking Off	2000–03	Red Production Company	BBC	Produced, set and filmed in Manchester
The Biggest Game in Town	2001	Granada Television	ITV	
Bob & Rose	2001	Red Production Company	ITV	Produced, set and filmed in Manchester
Linda Green	2001–02	Red Production Company	BBC	Produced, set and filmed in Manchester
Mastermind	2001–19	BBC	Discovery Channel/BBC Two	The Discovery Channel version was recorded at New Broadcasting House and the BBC revival series was recorded at Granada Studios, before transferring to Dock10, MediaCityUK until 2019 where the show was relocated to Blackstaff Studios in Belfast.
Doctor Zhivago	2002	Granada Television	ITV	Produced in Manchester at Granada Studios
Having It Off	2002	Red Production Company	BBC	Produced and set in Manchester
The Stretford Wives	2002	BBC	BBC One	Set in Stretford, Greater Manchester
Cutting It	2002–05	BBC North	BBC One	
Burn It	2003	Red Production Company	BBC	Produced, set and filmed in Manchester
The Deal	2003	Granada Television	Channel 4	Produced by Granada at Granada Studios
Living with Michael Jackson	2003	Granada Television	ITV	Documentary in which Martin Bashir interview American pop star Michael Jackson over a period of eight months. The UK airing had 15 million viewers, while 38 million watched the two-hour special on ABC.
The Second Coming	2003	Red Production Company	BBC One	Produced and filmed in Manchester
Early Doors	2003–04	Ovation Entertainment	BBC	Set in Manchester, but produced and filmed elsewhere
Real Story	2003–06	BBC North	BBC One	Produced at New Broadcasting House
My Life as a Teenage Robot	2003–07	Granada Television	ITV	
Blue Murder	2003–09	Granada Television/ITV Studios	ITV	Produced and filmed in Manchester
Christmas Lights	2004	Granada Television	ITV	
Conviction	2004	Red Production Company	ITV	Produced in Manchester with some filming in Manchester but primarily filmed in nearby Lancashire
Dirty Filthy Love	2004	Granada Television	ITV	Produced at Granada Studios
Sex Traffic	2004	Granada Television co-production	Channel 4	Joint commissioning with Big Motion Pictures, produced from Granada Studios.
Life Begins	2004–06	Granada Television	ITV	Produced by Granada Television
Northern Lights	2004–08	Granada Television	ITV	
Shameless	2004–13	Company Pictures	Channel 4	Produced, set and filmed in Manchester
Casanova	2005	Granada Television	BBC Three	Jointly produced by Red Production Company and Granada Television, both are based in Manchester
Colditz	2005	Granada Television	ITV	
Funland	2005	BBC Comedy North	BBC Three	Location filming in Blackpool with interiors shot at New Broadcasting House in Manchester
Honey, We're Killing the Kids	2005	BBC North	BBC Three	
Pierrepoint	2005	Granada Television	ITV	Drama film produced by Granada Television
Vincent	2005–06	Granada Television	ITV	Set in Manchester
Ideal	2005–11	BBC Comedy North/Baby Cow Productions	BBC Three	Interiors shot at New Broadcasting House in Manchester
The Jeremy Kyle Show	2005–19	Granada Television/ITV Studios	ITV	Originally recorded at Granada Studios but now transferred to Dock10, MediaCityUK.
Dracula	2006	Granada Television	BBC	
Eleventh Hour	2006	Granada Television	ITV	Produced and filmed in Manchester
Grownups	2006	BBC North	BBC Three	
I'm with Stupid	2006	BBC North	BBC Three	
See No Evil: The Moors Murders	2006	Granada Television	ITV	Docu-drama based on the Moors murders
Sinchronicity	2006	Shine Productions	BBC Three	Set and filmed in Manchester, but not produced there
Sorted	2006	BBC	BBC One	Set in Manchester, filmed in Stockport
Drop Dead Gorgeous	2006–07	Hat Trick North Productions		
The Innocence Project	2006–07	Tightrope Pictures	BBC One	Set and filmed in Manchester and Salford but commissioned through BBC Northern Ireland.
Life on Mars	2006–07	BBC North (amongst others)	BBC	A collaboration between many production companies such as Kudos and Red Planet Pictures. Manchester based companies BBC North and 3SixtyMedia were also involved and the programme was set and filmed in Manchester
New Street Law	2006–07	Red Production Company	BBC One	Produced by Red Production Company based at The Manchester Studios with some filming done in Manchester
Soapstar Superstar	2006–07	ITV Studios	ITV	Recorded at Granada Studios
The Street	2006–09	Granada/ITV Studios	BBC One	Set in an unnamed street in Manchester, it was produced and filmed in the city and at The Manchester Studios.
Lewis	2006–15	Granada Television co-production	ITV	Filmed on location in and around Oxford
Waterloo Road	2006–15	BBC North (BBC Manchester)	BBC One	Filmed and set in Rochdale until 2012.
Boy A	2007	Film4	Channel 4	Not set but mostly filmed in Manchester with final scenes filmed in Blackpool
Mobile	2007	ITV Studios	ITV	Set and filmed and Manchester along with Liverpool. BBC/ITV venture 3SixtyMedia were also involved in production
True Dare Kiss	2007	BBC Productions	BBC	Set and filmed in Manchester
City Lights	2007–08	Granada Television	ITV	
Cold Blood	2007–08	ITV Studios	ITV	Produced and filmed in Manchester
Britannia High	2008	ITV Studios	ITV	
Headcases	2008	Red Vision	ITV	Created by Manchester-based Red Vision
Massive	2008	BBC Comedy North	BBC Three	
Peter Kay's Britain's Got the Pop Factor...	2008	Ovation Entertainment	Channel 4	Filmed at Granada Studios
Poppy Shakespeare	2008	Cowboy Films	Channel 4	Filmed in Manchester
Spooks: Code 9	2008	BBC	BBC Three	Set in Manchester
Spanish Flu: The Forgotten Fallen	2008	BBC	BBC Four	Set in Manchester at the time of the 1918 flu pandemic
Sunshine	2008	BBC	BBC One	
Survivors	2008	BBC	BBC One	First series filmed in Manchester
Wired	2008	Granada Television	ITV	
Deadliest Crash: The Le Mans 1955 Disaster	2009	Bigger Pictures	BBC Four	Filmed on Princess Street
Paradox	2009	BBC	BBC One	Filmed and set in Manchester
Divided	2009–10	Talpa/Brighter Pictures/Remarkable Television	ITV	Filmed in Studio 8 at Granada Studios
Countdown	2009–present	ITV Studios	Channel 4	Originally produced and recorded at The Leeds Studios, before transferring to Granada Studios in 2009 and transferring again to Dock10, MediaCityUK in 2012.
Father & Son	2010	Left Bank	ITV	Set in Manchester, but mainly filmed in Dublin, which was criticised
The Road to Coronation Street	2010	BBC Drama	BBC Four	Granada Studios used and programme set and filmed in Manchester
Take Me Out	2010	Talkback Thames	ITV	First series filmed at Granada Studios before moving to The Maidstone Studios.
John Bishop's Britain	2010–11	Objective Productions North	BBC One	Filmed in Granada Studios for the first series and Dock10, MediaCityUK for the second series
Accused	2010–12	RSJ Films	BBC	Produced and filmed in Manchester
Appropriate Adult	2011	ITV Studios	ITV	Filmed in Manchester
The Body Farm	2011	BBC	BBC One	Filmed in Manchester and Macclesfield
Don't Scare the Hare	2011	Initial	BBC One	First show to be made at Dock10, MediaCityUK
Exile	2011	Red Production Company	BBC	Produced in Manchester with some parts filmed in Manchester
High Stakes	2011	ITV Studios/Escalate Television	ITV	Filmed in Studio 12 at Granada Studios
Tonight's the Night	2011	Barrowman Barker Productions	BBC One	Recorded at BBC Television Centre for the first series, BBC Pacific Quay for the second series and Dock10, MediaCityUK for the third series
United	2011	World Productions in conjunction with BBC North	BBC	Docu-drama based on the struggles Manchester United faced after the Munich Air Disaster in 1958
In with the Flynns	2011–12	BBC	BBC One	Produced and filmed at Teddington Studios but set in Manchester
White Van Man	2011–12	ITV Studios	BBC Three	Filmed in Manchester and Greater Manchester
Fresh Meat	2011–16	Lime Pictures	Channel 4	Filmed at The Sharp Project and also set in Manchester.
Scott & Bailey	2011–16	Red Production Company	ITV	Produced and filmed in Manchester
Mount Pleasant	2011–17	Tiger Aspect Productions	Sky1	Filmed at The Sharp Project and set in Manchester
Blue Peter	2011–present	BBC Children's	BBC	Broadcast from Dock10, MediaCityUK since September 2011
The Big Quiz	2011–present	ITV Studios	ITV	
Blackout	2012	Red Production Company	BBC	
The Sarah Millican Television Programme	2012–13	So Television/Chopsy Productions	BBC Two	All series were filmed at Dock10, MediaCityUK
Who Dares Wins	2012–19	12 Yard	BBC One	Originally filmed at BBC Television Centre for the first series, then moved to The London Studios for the second series, moved to BBC Pacific Quay for the third and fourth series, moved again to Granada Studios for the fifth series and finally to Dock10, MediaCityUK since the sixth series.
Dragons' Den	2012–present	BBC North (BBC Manchester)	BBC Two	Dragons "lair" was originally held in The Depository from 2005 to 2010, it was moved to Pinewood Studios in 2011 before being relocated to Dock10, MediaCityUK with the show now being produced by BBC North in association with Sony Pictures Television from 2012 to 2014, the show was relocated again to Space Studios Manchester from 2015 to 2017 before finally settling at the Old Granada Studios since 2018.
Britain's Brightest	2013	RDF Television	BBC One	Recorded at Dock10, MediaCityUK
Still Open All Hours	2013	BBC	BBC One	One-off 2013 special recorded at Dock10, MediaCityUK while the 2014 series was filmed at Teddington Studios and later series being made at Pinewood Studios since 2015
Skins	2013	Company Pictures	Channel 4	Although the series is set and filmed in Bristol, some scenes in the final series were filmed in Manchester
Swashbuckle	2013–22	BBC	CBeebies	Made at Dock10, MediaCityUK
The Voice UK	2013–present	Talpa/Wall to Wall Media/ITV Studios/Lifted Entertainment	BBC One/ITV	
The Furchester Hotel	2014–17	Sesame Workshop	CBeebies	All series were filmed at Dock10, MediaCityUK
Judge Rinder	2014–20	ITV Studios	ITV	Filmed at Dock10, MediaCityUK
House of Fools	2015	Pett Productions	BBC Two	Pilot filmed at BBC Television Centre with the first series recorded at Elstree Studios and the second series being made at Dock10, MediaCityUK
No Offence	2015	AbbottVision	Channel 4	
The Fanatics	2015	Victory Television	Sky One	
For What It's Worth	2016	Tuesday's Child	BBC One	All series made at Dock10, MediaCityUK with the first series being recorded without an audience and the second series being recorded with an audience.
Goodnight Sweetheart	2016	Retort	BBC One	2016 one-off filmed at Dock10, MediaCityUK
World of Sport Wrestling	2016	ITV Studios	ITV	One-off special was filmed in 2016 at Dock10, MediaCityUK while the series was filmed in 2018 at Epic Studios in Norwich
Alphabetical	2016–17	Gameface	ITV	All series recorded at Dock10, MediaCityUK
The Code	2016–17	Gogglebox Entertainment/Primal Media	BBC One	All series filmed at Dock10, MediaCityUK
Porridge	2016–17	BBC Studios	BBC One	All series filmed at Dock10, MediaCityUK
Let It Shine	2017	BBC Studios	BBC One	Filmed at Dock10, MediaCityUK
Pitch Battle	2017	Tuesday's Child	BBC One	Show filmed at Dock10, MediaCityUK
The Price Is Right	2017	Thames	Channel 4	2017 one-off filmed at Dock10, MediaCityUK
Watchdog	2017–19	BBC Studios	BBC One	Originally filmed at BBC Television Centre from 1980 until 2012, then moved to The Hospital Club from 2013 to 2015, moved to Broadcasting House in 2016 and finally moved to Dock10, MediaCityUK from 2017 to 2019
!mpossible	2017–21	Mighty Productions	BBC One	All series filmed at Dock10, MediaCityUK
Naked Attraction	2017–present	Studio Lambert	Channel 4	First series recorded at The London Studios before moved to Dock10, MediaCityUK since the second series
Saturday Mash-Up!	2017–present	BBC Studios	CBBC	Filmed live at Dock10, MediaCityUK
The Voice Kids	2017–23	Talpa/ITV Studios/Lifted Entertainment	ITV	
Top of the Box	2018	BBC Studios	Channel 5	Filmed at Dock10, MediaCityUK
The £100K Drop	2018–19	Remarkable Television	Channel 4	Originally filmed at 3 Mills Studios called The Million Pound Drop, relocated to Dock10, MediaCityUK and renamed The £100K Drop
All Together Now	2018–19	Remarkable Television	BBC One	All series made at Dock10, MediaCityUK
Sport Relief	2018–20	BBC Studios	BBC One/BBC Two	Originally filmed at BBC Television Centre from 2002 to 2012, then transferred to Copper Box Arena from 2014 to 2016 and finally transferred to Dock10, MediaCityUK from 2018 to 2020
Win Your Wish List	2018–21	Stellify Media	Channel 5	Channel 5 version recorded at Dock10, MediaCityUK
Britain's Brightest Family	2018–21	Gameface	ITV	All series filmed at Dock10, MediaCityUK
Who Wants to Be a Millionaire?	2018–present	Stellify Media	ITV	Originally filmed at Elstree Studios for it original run (BBC Television Centre was briefly filmed between 2011 and 2012). The revival is filmed at Dock10, MediaCityUK
Eurovision: You Decide	2019	BBC Studios	BBC Two	2019 national selection filmed at Dock10, MediaCityUK
Rolling In It	2020–21	Over The Top Productions	ITV	All series recorded at Dock10, MediaCityUK
Alan Carr's Epic Gameshow	2020–22	Talkback	ITV	All series filmed at Dock10, MediaCityUK
Crackerjack!	2020–21	BBC Studios	CBBC	All series made at Dock10, MediaCityUK
Moneybags	2021–22	Youngest North	Channel 4	All series recorded at Dock10, MediaCityUK
Children in Need	2021–present	BBC Studios	BBC One/BBC Two	Originally filmed at BBC Television Centre from 1980 to 2012, transferred to BBC Elstree Centre from 2013 to 2020 and finally to Dock10, MediaCityUK since 2021
Lingo	2021–present	Objective Media Group	ITV	All series filmed at Dock10, MediaCityUK
Moneyball	2021–23	Possessed/Potato	ITV	Filmed at Dock10, MediaCityUK
Sitting on a Fortune	2021–23	Possessed/Potato	ITV	Made at Dock10, MediaCityUK
Romeo & Duet	2022	Goat Films	ITV	Recorded at Dock10, MediaCityUK
Comic Relief	2022–present	BBC Studios	BBC One/BBC Two	Originally filmed at BBC Television Centre from 1988 to 2013, moved to The London Palladium in 2015, then to The O2 in 2017, transferred to BBC Elstree Centre from 2019 to 2021 and finally to Dock10, MediaCityUK since 2022
The 1% Club	2022–present	Magnum Media	ITV	All series filmed at Dock10, MediaCityUK
Riddiculous	2022–present	East Media	ITV	Filmed at Dock10, MediaCityUK
Catchphrase	2022–present	STV Studios/DRG	ITV	The original series originally filmed at The Maidstone Studios from 1985 to 1992 before transferring to Carlton Studios from 1994 to 2002. The revival series originally filmed at The London Studios in 2013 before transferring to The Maidstone Studios from 2014 to 2015, briefly returned to The London Studios from 2016 to 2017 then moved back to The Maidstone Studios from 2018 to 2022 before finally moving to Dock10, MediaCityUK since 2022.
Deal or No Deal	2023	Remarkable Television	ITV	The original series originally filmed at Paintworks from 2005 to 2013 before transferring to The Bottle Yard Studios from 2013 to 2016. The first series of the revival was filmed at Dock10, MediaCityUK in 2023 before it was transferred to The Maidstone Studios since 2024.
Jeopardy!	2024–25	Whisper North	ITV	The 2024 revival is filmed in Dock10, MediaCityUK.
Wheel of Fortune	2024–present	Whisper North	ITV	The 2024 revival is recorded in Dock10, MediaCityUK.

== Awards given to Manchester produced or filmed programmes ==
=== BAFTAs ===
Since the introduction of the best drama series at the BAFTAs in 1992, Mancunian produced or filmed drama has won the award on 9 occasions out of the 19 awarded (up to 2011) - more than any other city. Cracker (Granada Television) won twice in 1995 and 1996, The Cops (filmed in Manchester) won twice in 1999 and 2000, Clocking Off (Red Production Company, Manchester production company based at Granada) in 2001, Cold Feet (Granada Television) in 2002, Shameless (filmed in Manchester) in 2005 and The Street (Granada Television) in 2007 and 2008.

Peggy Ashcroft won a BAFTA TV award for best actress in 1985 in her performance in The Jewel In The Crown and later Helen Mirren won best actress three consecutive times, a record, for her performance in the Granada-produced Prime Suspect series.

== See also ==
- List of films set in Manchester
- List of national radio programmes made in Manchester
