= Le Mans 1955 (film) =

2018 French animated short film

- Written by: Julien Lilti
- Story by: l M
- Directed by: Quentin Baillieux
- Music by: Ali Elvis Helnwein
- Country of origin: France
- Original languages: English, French

Production
- Producers: Nicolas de Rosanbo & Carole Lambert
- Editors: Benjamin Massoubre & Vincent Tricon
- Running time: 15 minutes

Original release
- Network: Canal+
- Release: June 30, 2018

Le Mans 1955 is a 2018 French adult animated short film directed by Quentin Baillieux and produced by Nicolas de Rosanbo & Carole Lambert inspired by the 1955 Le Mans disaster. The short has been presented in a number of festivals including in the Clermont-Ferrand International Short Film Festival and the Annecy International Animated Film Festival in 2019, and won awards such as the St. Louis International Film Festival for Best Animated Short Film award, qualifying it for the Oscars, but it did not receive a nomination.

== Plot ==
24 Hours of Le Mans, 1955. 300,000 spectators are in attendance. Mercedes-Benz's Silver Arrows, fielding an international all-star team of drivers, are the favorites to win. For team manager Alfred Neubauer, it is his final race before retirement. As such, he hopes to win big, and is pinning his hopes on his first team of Juan Manuel Fangio and Stirling Moss. The team's second car, driven by Pierre Levegh and John Fitch, is to support them and make sure they keep the lead. Fitch is disappointed that they aren't being trusted to take the lead spot, but Levegh assures him that they could still be the winning car, as "anything can happen in 24 hours."

The Le Mans start sees early trouble for the Mercedes team when Fangio's car stalls at the start, leaving Levegh as the primary car. As Fitch watches, Levegh tries to catch the leading Jaguar of Mike Hawthorn, while Fangio struggles to make up for lost time. At 6:26 p.m., as the Mercedes drivers are preparing to switch for the next leg, a huge fireball erupts in the stands across from the pits. Fangio, coming in to switch with Moss, reports that the source is Levegh's car, which has left the track and crashed into the crowd, killing many people.

As Fitch observes the carnage, Neubauer tells him that Moss is moving up, expressing hope that they can still win. Fitch berates Neubauer for his apparent cold-heartedness to the situation and urges him to withdraw Moss's car, which Neubauer is reluctant to do. In the early light of dawn, just as Moss takes the lead, Neubauer makes the decision to pull Mercedes-Benz out of the 24 Hours of Le Mans, declaring, "We are racing drivers, we're not monsters."

The film ends with intertitles explaining how Mercedes-Benz were the only team to withdraw from the race and did not compete in motorsports for 43 years, that Fitch dedicated himself to road safety, and that with a death count of 80 people, the crash remains the deadliest accident in motorsports history.

== Cast ==
- Nathan Willcocks - John Fitch
- Joe Sheridan - Alfred Neubauer
- Nicholas Mead - Pierre Levegh
- Alonso Venegas Flores - Juan Manuel Fangio

== Awards ==
Since its launch, the film has received numerous awards, and selected in more than 75 festivals around the world.

Year	Presenter/Festival	Award/Category	Status
2018	Off Courts - Trouville (France)	"Best animated short film"	Nominated
2018	Warsaw International Film Festival (Poland)	"Best animated short film"	Nominated
2018	St. Louis International Film Festival (USA)	"Best Animated Short Film"	Won
2019	French Animation Film Festival, Rennes (France)	"Grand Prix for a Professional Short Film"	Won
2019	Académie des Arts et Techniques du Cinéma (France)	César Award for Best Short Film	Shortlisted
2019	Annecy International Animated Film Festival (France)	"Best Animated Short Film 2019"	Nominated
2019	Animamundi Film Festival (Brazil)	"Best Animated Short Film"	Nominated
2019	Animayo, Las Palmas, Canary Islands (Spain)	"Best Art Direction"	Won
2019	Short Shorts Film Festival & Asia, Tokyo (China, Japan)	"Best CG"	Nominated
2019	HollyShorts Film Festival - Los Angeles (USA)	"Best Animated Short Film"	Nominated

== Historical inaccuracies ==
- Despite starting the race late due to a technical difficulty, Fangio was actually in second position at the moment of the crash, behind Hawthorn in first. Shortly before the crash, Hawthorn had lapped Levegh (who was in 6th position) and Lance Macklin, who was also involved in the crash. In the film, Levegh is portrayed as challenging Hawthorn for the lead while Fangio is struggling to make his way up the field.
- Neubauer did not have the authority to retire from the race. Such a decision had to be taken by the Mercedes board of directors in Germany. It took several hours for the directors to be called together, after which they issued the order to retire from the race. In the film, Fitch is shown urging Neubauer to withdraw, and Neubauer initially hesitating, unwilling to abandon his final race. There does not seem to be supporting evidence for the idea that Neubauer was reluctant to withdraw from the race, and the scene is best considered an invention for dramatic effect.
- There was a third Mercedes-Benz car, number 21, driven by Karl Kling and André Simon. The car itself appears briefly early in the film, but does not show up afterwards, and neither Kling nor Simon are seen or mentioned.
- Fangio reported that Levegh had given him a "slow down" hand signal immediately before the crash, which he credited with saving his life. The film makes no mention of this during Fangio's brief dialogue.
- The fatal crash occurred at 6:26pm on June 11, when there was still plenty of daylight, whereas the film portrays the crash as occurring at night.
