= Cold Feet series 2 =

Cold Feet
- Series 2
- No. of episodes: 6

Release
- Original network: ITV
- Original release: 26 September – 31 October 1999

Series chronology
- ← Previous; Series 1 Next → Series 3

The second series of the British comedy-drama television series Cold Feet was first broadcast on the ITV network from 26 September to 31 October 1999. The six episodes were written by series creator Mike Bullen, produced by Christine Langan, and directed by Tom Hooper, Tom Vaughan and Pete Travis. The storylines focus on three couples: Adam Williams and Rachel Bradley, Pete and Jenny Gifford, and David and Karen Marsden who are played by James Nesbitt, Helen Baxendale, John Thomson, Fay Ripley, Robert Bathurst and Hermione Norris respectively.

The series followed multiple storylines for the characters: Rachel returns to Manchester and she and Adam begin seeing other people, though reunite after he is treated for testicular cancer; Pete and Jenny's relationship falters after she thinks she no longer loves him and he has an affair with a colleague; Karen and David work their way through his redundancy from work and are elated to learn Karen is pregnant. Bullen drew on real-life experiences for the storylines, and contributions were made to the script by other production staff. Filming took place in the first half of 1999, and took in locations in Greater Manchester, Lindisfarne in Northumberland, and Paris.

Critics reacted well to the series and drew favourable comparisons to other visual media. Viewing figures reached a high of 9.48 million for Episode 6. The series was nominated for several awards, including four British Academy Television Awards. All six episodes have been released on VHS, DVD, and through Internet media distributors.

== Episodes ==
No.	Title	Directed by	Written by	Original release date	Viewers (millions)
7	Episode 1	Tom Hooper	Mike Bullen	26 September 1999	8.08
Pete and Jenny set Adam up with Amy (Rosie Cavaliero), one of Pete's co-workers. Rachel arrives unexpectedly at Karen and David's house, and Pete later sees her with someone else's baby at the supermarket. Convinced that it is his baby, Adam invites Rachel around his house, where she tells him she had an abortion. David is made redundant and decides to become a full-time house husband after Josh is nearly hit by a car. Jenny tells Pete that she thinks she no longer loves him.
8	Episode 2	Tom Hooper	Mike Bullen	3 October 1999	7.95
Pete reads Jenny's diary to see if there is another man in her life. He reads that she kissed Adam, and punches his friend at work. The two later sort out their differences. Adam is still trying to dump the clingy Amy, but invites one of her attractive colleagues, Rachel (2) (Rachel Fielding), to be his lodger. Rachel tries to make amends with Adam but his horrified when she finds him, Rachel 2 and Amy, half-naked in his hallway. Natalie offers David a new job.
9	Episode 3	Tom Vaughan	Mike Bullen	10 October 1999	7.96
Rachel returns to her old advertising job and is asked on a date by Danny (Hugh Dancy), a younger co-worker. Rachel 2 moves out of Adam's, so Jenny sets him up with a woman, Callie (Natalie Roles), from a lonely hearts column. On a team-building weekend, Pete and Amy book into a motel, where they sleep together. Karen and David go to Paris for their anniversary, and Adam is humiliated on his blind date when he is seated with Rachel and Danny.
10	Episode 4	Tom Vaughan	Mike Bullen	17 October 1999	8.64
A boring dinner party leads Karen to re-evaluate her lifestyle; she gives her expensive clothes to charity and gets herself a tattoo. Adam, Pete and Jenny get invited to their school reunion. Rachel breaks up with Danny, and, after agreeing to be friends with Adam, goes to his reunion as his pretend date. Pete tells Adam about his affair with Amy, and Adam—thinking they can share secrets—tells Karen, who then tells Jenny.
11	Episode 5	Pete Travis	Mike Bullen	24 October 1999	9.14
Adam is devastated when he is diagnosed with testicular cancer and a probable malignant tumour. Jenny throws Pete out of the house following his infidelity, telling him to take all of his things with him. Unable to cope with their petty fighting, Adam blurts out that he has cancer, shocking the couple. David's younger brother, Nick (Stephen Moyer), arrives at the Marsdens' house and takes a liking to Rachel. After his surgery, Adam and Rachel get back together, and Pete and Jenny give their marriage another try.
12	Episode 6	Pete Travis	Mike Bullen	31 October 1999	9.48
David arranges a trip for the couples to Lindisfarne, where they can see in the new millennium together. Pete and Jenny's relationship is frosty but Adam and Rachel make up for lost time in the bedroom. After Adam and Pete temporarily get stranded in their boat while coming back from the mainland, the Giffords' relationship gets worse. Karen tells David she is pregnant. After Ramona removes the batteries from Pete's "Millennium clock", the couples see in the year 2000 on the beach.

== Production ==
=== Cast ===
All six main cast members from the first series returned; James Nesbitt as Adam Williams, Helen Baxendale as Rachel Bradley, John Thomson as Pete Gifford, Fay Ripley as Jenny Gifford, Robert Bathurst as David Marsden and Hermione Norris as Karen Marsden. Recurring cast member Jacey Salles also returned to play the Marsdens' nanny Ramona Ramirez in all six episodes. Rosie Cavaliero joined the series to play Pete's co-worker and mistress Amy in six episodes, Lorelei King reprised her role as David's boss Natalie Lawrence in three episodes, Hugh Dancy guest starred in two episodes as Rachel's colleague and toyboy Danny Burke, and Stephen Moyer guest starred in one episode as David's wayward brother Nick.

=== Writing ===
Planning of the second series had already begun before the first series was broadcast. Andy Harries believed that the first series had used up a lot of storylines, and the production team decided to focus on more dramatic plots rather than "whimsical humour". The producers also decided to have more non-linear storylines. When developing the plot of Series 1, Episode 6—in which Rachel discovers that she is pregnant with two possible fathers—Bullen, Harries and Langan were concerned about the outcome; Harries believed that a miscarriage would be "a cop-out". Baxendale found the abortion storyline difficult, as she had given birth to her first child the year before.

The marijuana scenes in Episode 4 were originally scripted differently: Karen and Adam's recreational drug use played out the same but Granada's legal department objected to the scenes because to Independent Television Commission's (ITC) code of conduct forbade the depiction of drug use unless it is shown in a negative light. The legal team proposed Adam and Karen getting arrested at the school reunion as a resolution. Bullen found this idea "ludicrous" and a repetition of the Adam and Pete's arrest in Series 1, Episode 5. As a compromise, Bullen wrote an extra scene where David discovers what he thinks is Ramona's marijuana, and lectures her on the social and personal ramifications of its use. The scene ends with Ramona correcting David; it is actually tobacco, which David, relievedly, considers "harmless". Ramona refutes this by telling him tobacco causes cancer. Bullen was pleased to be able to subvert the anti-drugs message and relished putting the words into the mouth of David, "the most buffoonish of characters". Robert Bathurst and Jacey Salles were also pleased with the scene; Bathurst thought the scene was "a neat device" as a disclaimer and Salles was proud that Ramona got "the last word" in the argument and was beginning to assert herself as her English speaking improved.

Bullen, Langan and Harries decided to give one of the characters cancer early in the storylining stages. Breast cancer in women had received a lot of publicity, so was ruled out for being "too obvious". Testicular cancer had begun to receive greater attention around that time, and Harries believed that Cold Feet could publicise the illness. The condition would also provide a direct contrast to Adam's "Lothario" characterisation. Harries had been influenced by journalist John Diamond's personal account of his own cancer. Bullen also used Diamond's columns for research, and liaised with Imperial Cancer Research. Partway through writing the episode, Langan learned that the series' publicist Ian Johnson's partner had testicular cancer. Johnson talked Bullen through what happens before, during and after treatment, and proofread the script drafts. He also spoke with James Nesbitt during the filming of the episode. Bullen took the opportunity to add humour to the otherwise dramatic storyline by scripting Adam's dream to feature a parody of Rover, the white ball from the 1960s TV series The Prisoner, in this case representing an enormous testicle.

=== Filming ===
Three new directors were hired by Granada to lead filming on the second series, so the style of the first series was not repeated; Tom Hooper, Tom Vaughan and Pete Travis directed two episodes each. Hooper came from a background directing Byker Grove and EastEnders, and Cold Feet was his first production with a larger budget. The first series' interior filming was based at the Blue Shed Studios in Salford. For this series, filming moved to the larger Spectrum Arena in Warrington. Filming began on 22 March 1999 and ran for three months until June.

The first scene filmed for the second series was Episode 1, Scene 55, in which Pete sees Rachel and what he thinks is her baby in the supermarket. The scene was shot in a Morrisons supermarket on a Sunday evening after closing time. Although many babies played the one part, Tom Hooper found the scene difficult. Another scene in the same episode featured David pulling Josh from out of the way of an oncoming car. The scene was filmed in two parts; one of David pulling Josh out of the way, acting in front of a green screen, and the other of the car coming towards the camera. The two parts were composited afterwards. When rehearsing the scene, Bathurst picked up a lightweight dummy. As the child actor in the scene as filmed was much heavier, Bathurst had to drag him, as he could not pick him up. He believed the result looked more realistic. The paintball scenes in Episode 3 were filmed at Tatton Park in Cheshire. Tom Vaughan directed the scene like "a bad action movie". Although safety advisers were on set, John Thomson and Rosie Cavaliero were injured by the paintballs.

Episode 3 also featured the series' first scenes filmed outside England; Karen and David's anniversary storyline was originally scripted to conclude with the couple not meeting up due to a misunderstanding. Harries read the script and declared that it had no ending but Bullen defended it that as being the point. After filming concluded, the editor said the same thing, and Bullen decided a rewrite was needed. Vaughan thought the characters needed an uplifting ending because the other couples had downbeat dramatic endings in the same episode. A crew member suggested the characters should meet in Paris, so a scheduled two-day break in production was used to send a skeleton crew of Robert Bathurst, Hermione Norris, Christine Langan, Tom Vaughan and the director of photography Peter Middleton to the city to film the scenes with a small French crew. Bullen wrote the scene of David leaving a voicemail for Natalie, but the rest was improvised. The restaurant Karen and David eat at featured the illuminated Notre Dame Cathedral in the background. As the scene was being filmed, the lights were turned off, so Middleton had the French crew use their car headlights to re-illuminate it. Vaughan found the improvisation to be exciting, and Norris was pleased that a scene could show "the love and tenderness between Karen and David after all the sniping that had been going on".

Episode 6 was shot on location on Lindisfarne, though the setting had not been chosen when production on the episode commenced. A production manager suggested Lindisfarne as a location after seeing it in the film Cul-de-sac (Roman Polanski, 1966). Bullen and Pete Travis visited the island the following day and were "inspired by the beauty and dramatic possibilities" of the location. Bullen then wrote the script, which Travis compared to The Big Chill (Lawrence Kasdan, 1983), in two days. The Lindisfarne shoot lasted for five days; interior scenes of the castle were shot at Hoghton Tower in Lancashire.

== Reception ==
=== Broadcast and ratings ===
The first series had been broadcast in the 9.30 p.m. timeslot on Sunday nights. This was a compromise between Harries and ITV director of channels David Liddiment; Liddiment wanted it to go out at 10 p.m. because he believed that viewers needed to concentrate on the plot; in the 9 p.m. "ironing slot"—for undemanding programmes. For the second series, Harries was able to get Cold Feet moved to 9 p.m., an action that made advertisers "furious". For the second time, Allied Domecq's Cockburn's Port sponsored the broadcast. The deal, which included prominent advertisements either side of commercial breaks, was estimated to be worth £1.4 million.

Episode 1 averaged 8.08 million viewers on first broadcast, making it the 25th-most-watched programme of the week and the fifth-most-watched drama. Episode 2 dropped to 7.95 million viewers and the 36th-most-watched programme (sixth-most-watched drama). Despite the promotion it received, it still lost five million viewers after Heartbeat. The third week grew to 7.96 million and the 32nd-most-watched programme. The fourth episode recovered to 8.64 million viewers as the 25th-most-watched programme. Episode 5's audience grew to 9.14 million, taking some 25% of Michael Palin's Hemingway Adventure's viewers. The final episode drew 9.48 million viewers, making it the 19th-most-watched programme of the week.

=== Critical reaction ===
Paul Hoggart of The Times wrote that the series was "extremely and self-consciously stylish", writing highly of the fantasy scenes, the blending of "real life" scenes, and the multiple plotlines. However, he criticised the emotional impact that Rachel's admission of her abortion had, stating that "it was obvious from the moment she appeared that she had returned without a baby". He concluded his review by writing that "the substance always matters more than the presentation". Kathleen Morgan for the Daily Record wrote, "There was always a danger that Cold Feet wouldn't live up to its first series, but yet again it left its rivals standing." She wrote positively of the scenes in Episode 2 where Jenny's revelation that she loves Adam is drowned out by the whistling kettle, and of Adam's apparent threesome with Rosie and Rachel 2. She concluded by calling it "a classic episode". Andrew Billen for the New Statesman also enjoyed Episode 2, comparing the phone scene to David Jason as Del Boy falling through the bar in an episode of Only Fools and Horses, "except this was more painful".

The Mirror's Charlie Catchpole called Episode 4 "Funny, sad, touching. Brilliantly written, superbly acted" and complemented to the school disco scenes, off-handedly writing, "I want the CD". Catchpole was unaware that a soundtrack CD had been shelved; Christine Langan read Catchpole's column and faxed his comments to Global Media Group, who resumed plans for a soundtrack within 24 hours. Of Episode 5, Catchpole praised the scene where Adam shared his cancer worries with the cab driver, and Adam's Prisoner-esque dream. Robert Bathurst did not like the scene; he believed that the computer-generated testicle was of poor quality and thought that, instead of it being on screen for so long, it should have come down like a Monty Python foot. The Daily Record picked Episode 6 as its "drama of the week".

The series was nominated for four British Academy Television Awards: Mike Bullen and Christine Langan received the nomination for the BAFTA TV Award for Best Drama Series; Mark Russell the nomination for Best Original Television Music; Peter Terry, Matt Howarth and Susan Voudouris the nomination for Best Graphic Design; Tim Waddell the nomination for Best Editing (Fiction/Entertainment). At the British Comedy Awards, the series won Best TV Comedy Drama and James Nesbitt won Best TV Comedy Actor. At the Broadcast Awards, the series won in the Drama: Series or Serial category.

== Home media ==
Cold Feet: The Complete 2nd Series was released in the UK by Video Collection International and Granada Media on VHS on 10 April 2000, and on region 2 DVD on 16 October 2000. It was released in the United States by Acorn Media on 26 April 2005 and in Australia by Time Life on 5 December 2006.
