= 1955 Le Mans disaster =

Fatal motor racing crash in France

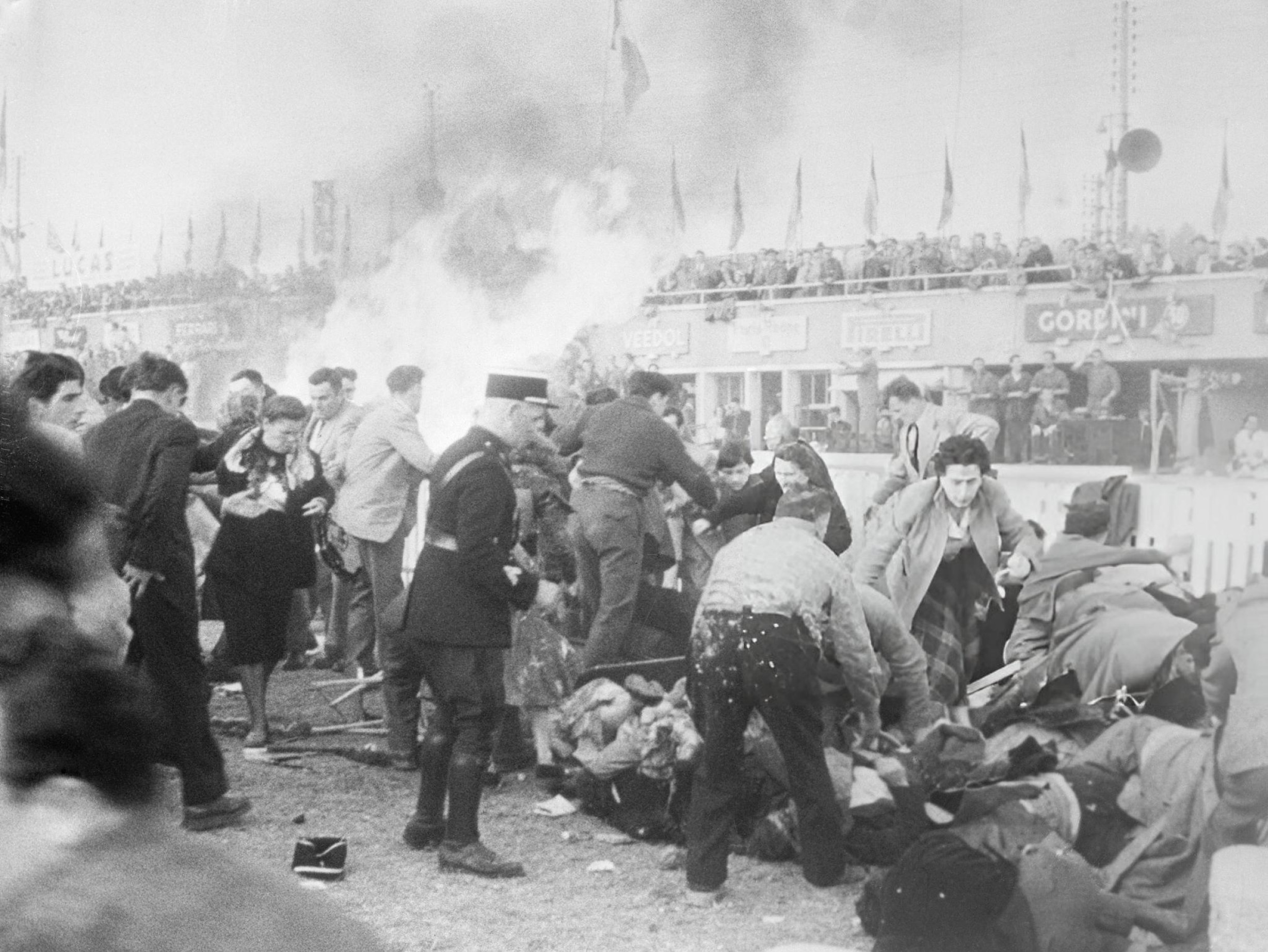
- Police and bystanders searching for survivors in the aftermath of the crash
- Date: 11 June 1955; 71 years ago
- Venue: Circuit de la Sarthe
- Location: Le Mans, Sarthe, France; 47°56′59.5″N 0°12′26″E
- Type: Racing crash
- Cause: Track layout
- Deaths: 82-84 (81-83 spectators and driver Pierre Levegh)
- Injuries: At least 120
- Inquiries: Official government inquiry

On 11 June 1955, a multi-vehicle collision occurred during the 1955 24 Hours of Le Mans in Sarthe, France, resulting in the deaths of an estimated 82 to 84 people. The disaster occurred at the Circuit de la Sarthe, when Mercedes driver Pierre Levegh collided with Austin-Healey driver Lance Macklin after a maneuvre by Jaguar Cars driver Mike Hawthorn. Levegh and his car were hurled into a spectator arena, causing his car to disintegrate and throwing him onto the racetrack, killing him instantly. Debris from the car and the arena flew into the crowd, killing at least 82 people. The disaster is the deadliest event in motorsport history, prompting multiple European countries to ban motorsports entirely; Switzerland did not officially lift its ban until 2022.

There was much debate over blame for the disaster. The official inquiry held none of the drivers specifically responsible, but criticized the layout of the 30-year-old track, which had not been designed for cars as fast as those involved in the crash.

== Before the crash ==
There was great anticipation for the 1955 24 Hours of Le Mans, as Ferrari, Jaguar, and Mercedes-Benz had all won the race previously and all three automakers had arrived with new and improved cars. The Ferraris, current champions at the time, were known to be fast but fragile and prone to mechanical failure. Jaguar concentrated their racing almost exclusively on Le Mans and had an experienced driver lineup including Formula 1 Ferrari driver Mike Hawthorn.

After gaining success in F1, Mercedes-Benz had debuted its new 300 SLR in that year's World Sportscar Championship, including a record-setting win at the Mille Miglia for Stirling Moss. The 300 SLR featured a body made of an ultra-lightweight magnesium alloy called Elektron. The car lacked the more effective state-of-the-art disc brakes featured on the rival Jaguar D-Type, instead incorporating inboard drum brakes and a large air brake behind the driver that could be raised to increase drag and slow the car.

Mercedes team manager Alfred Neubauer assembled a multinational team for the race: pairing his two best drivers Juan Manuel Fangio and Stirling Moss in the lead car, 1952 race winner Karl Kling with Frenchman André Simon (both also in the F1 team), and American John Fitch with one of the elder statesmen of French motor racing, Pierre Levegh. It had been Levegh's unprecedented solo drive in the 1952 race that failed in the last hour, which allowed Mercedes-Benz their first Le Mans victory.

Aside from two layout changes to make the circuit shorter, the Circuit de la Sarthe was largely unaltered since the inception of the race in 1923, when top speeds of cars were typically in the region of 100 km/h (60 mph). By 1955, top speeds for the leading cars were over 270 km/h (170 mph). The circuit had been resurfaced and widened after the Second World War. The pits and grandstands had been reconstructed, but there were no barriers between the pit lane and the racing line, and only a 1.2 m (4 ft) earthen bank between the track and the spectators. The cars had no seat belts; the drivers reasoned that it was preferable to be thrown clear in a collision rather than be crushed or trapped in a burning car.

The 1955 race began at 4 pm on Saturday, and the lead cars of Eugenio Castellotti (Ferrari), Hawthorn (Jaguar), and Fangio (Mercedes-Benz) were at the head of the field in the first hour. The other team cars were being kept on tighter leashes to conserve the cars, but still racing in the top ten. Going into the second hour, Castellotti started dropping back, but Hawthorn and Fangio continued the duel, swapping the lead and dropping the lap record further, lapping most of the field.

The accident happened at 6:26 pm, at the end of lap 35, when the first pit stops for the leading cars began.

== The crash ==
=== Immediate cause ===
On lap 35, Hawthorn and Fangio were still racing for the lead. The lap before, Hawthorn's pit crew had signalled for him to come in the next lap. He had just lapped Levegh, who was running sixth, after the corner Arnage, and was determined to keep Fangio at bay for as long as he could. Coming out of the Maison Blanche portion of the course, he rapidly caught up to Lance Macklin in his Austin Healey 100S, who had seen him and moved over to the right to let him pass. Putting another lap on Macklin coming up to the main straight, Hawthorn then raised his hand to indicate he was pitting and pulled across to the right, and using the Jaguar's advanced disc brakes, braked hard enough to rapidly slow his Jaguar from his racing speed, catching Macklin out.

=== Collision ===
Stage by stage reconstruction of the racing accident

External videos
- Le Mans Motor Racing Disaster (1955) by British Pathé. Crash is shown at 1:15.

There were two key factors regarding the track layout at that time. There was no designated deceleration lane for cars coming into the pits, and just before the main straight, there was a very slight right-hand kink in the road just after which Hawthorn started braking.

Macklin, who also braked hard, ran off the right-hand edge of the track, throwing up dust. Noticing that Hawthorn was slowing down, Macklin swerved left to avoid Hawthorn. As a result, Macklin's car veered across to the centre of the track, briefly out of control. This put him into the way of Levegh's Mercedes, closing in at over 200 km/h (120 mph), intent on doing another lap and in front of Fangio, who was waiting to pass. Levegh had no time to evade and, as he was about to collide, raised his hand to warn Fangio, who subsequently squeezed through the carnage and streaked past Hawthorn's then-stationary Jaguar in the pits, allowing him to pass unscathed.

Levegh's front-right wheel rode up the rear-left of Macklin's car, which acted as a ramp and launched Levegh's car into the air, flying over spectators and rolling end over end for 80 metres (260 ft). Levegh was thrown out of his tumbling car and hit the ground, crushing his skull upon impact and killing him instantly.

The critical kink in the road put the car on a direct trajectory toward the packed terraces and grandstand. The car landed on the earthen embankment between the spectators and the track, bounced, then slammed into a concrete stairwell structure and disintegrated. The momentum of the heaviest components of the car – the engine block, radiator, and front suspension – hurtled them into the crowd for almost 100 metres (330 ft), crushing all in their path. The bonnet lid scythed through the air, "decapitating tightly jammed spectators like a guillotine". Spectators who had climbed onto ladders and scaffolding to get a better view of the track, and those crowding to use the underpass to get to the pits, found themselves in the way of the lethal debris.

Jaguar driver Duncan Hamilton, watching from the pit wall, recalled, "The scene on the other side of the road was indescribable. The dead and dying were everywhere; the cries of pain, anguish, and despair screamed catastrophe. I stood as if in a dream, too horrified to even think."

When the rest of Levegh's car landed on the embankment, the rear-mounted fuel tank exploded. The fuel fire raised the temperature of the remaining Elektron bodywork past its ignition temperature, which was lower than that of other metal alloys due to its high magnesium content. The alloy burst into white-hot flames, showering the track and crowd with magnesium embers, made worse by rescue workers unfamiliar with magnesium fires pouring water onto the inferno, greatly intensifying the flames. As a result, the car burned for several hours.

Meanwhile, Macklin's car, heavily damaged, rammed the left-side barrier, then veered to the right of the track into the pit lane, narrowly missing Kling's Mercedes-Benz, Roberto Mieres's Maserati, and Don Beauman's Jaguar, all of which were already in the pits refuelling before the accident. Macklin's car hit the unprotected pit-wall, just short of the Cunningham and Mercedes-Benz pits where Shell and Lockheed equipment were stationed, running down a policeman, a photographer and two officials (all seriously injured), then rebounded back across the track again and ground down the left-side fence for a second time. Macklin, having got through the incident with no injuries, jumped out of his wrecked car and over the bank.

== Aftermath ==
=== Following hours ===
Hawthorn had overshot his pits and stopped. Getting out, he was immediately ordered by his team to get back in and do another lap to get away from the total confusion and danger. When he stopped during the next lap, he staggered out of the car thinking that he had caused the catastrophe. Ivor Bueb and Norman Dewis, both Le Mans debutants, had to step into their respective cars for their first driver stints.

John Fitch, Levegh's American co-driver, had suited up and was ready to take over the car at the upcoming pit stop, and was standing with Levegh's wife, Denise Bouillin, both of them witnessing the catastrophe. Levegh's lifeless and severely burned body lay in full view on the pavement until a gendarme hauled down a banner to cover it. Half an hour after the crash, Fitch realised that news was likely being broadcast on the radio, and he needed to telephone his family to reassure them that he was not the driver of the crashed car. When he got to the media centre to use a telephone, he overheard a reporter filing that 48 deaths were already confirmed.

When Fitch returned to his pit, he urged the Mercedes team to withdraw from the race, as continuing to compete would be a public relations disaster for Mercedes-Benz regardless of whether they won or lost. Team manager Alfred Neubauer had already reached the same conclusion, but did not have the authority to make such a decision.

Despite expectations for the race to be red-flagged and stopped entirely, race officials, led by race director Charles Faroux, kept the race running. In the days after the disaster, several explanations were offered by Faroux for this course of action. They included:

- that if the huge crowd of spectators had tried to leave en masse, they would have choked the main roads around, severely impeding access for medical and emergency crews trying to save the injured;
- that firms participating in the race could have sued the race organizers for huge sums of money;
- that "the rough law of sport dictates that the race shall go on", with Faroux specifically pointing to the 1952 Farnborough Airshow crash as precedent for doing so;
- that he did not have the authority to stop the race at all, and that Prefect Pierre Trouille was the only individual empowered to do so, as France's onsite representative to the Ministry of the Interior.

After an emergency meeting and vote of Mercedes-Benz company directors by telephone in Stuttgart, West Germany, Neubauer got the call approving his team's withdrawal just before midnight. Waiting until 1:45 am, when many spectators had left, he stepped onto the track and quietly called his cars into the pits, at the time running first and third. Their retirement was briefly announced over the public address system. The Mercedes trucks were packed up and gone by morning. Chief engineer Rudolf Uhlenhaut had gone to the Jaguar pits to ask if the Jaguar team would respond in kind, out of respect for the crash victims. Jaguar team manager "Lofty" England declined.

=== Conclusion of the race ===
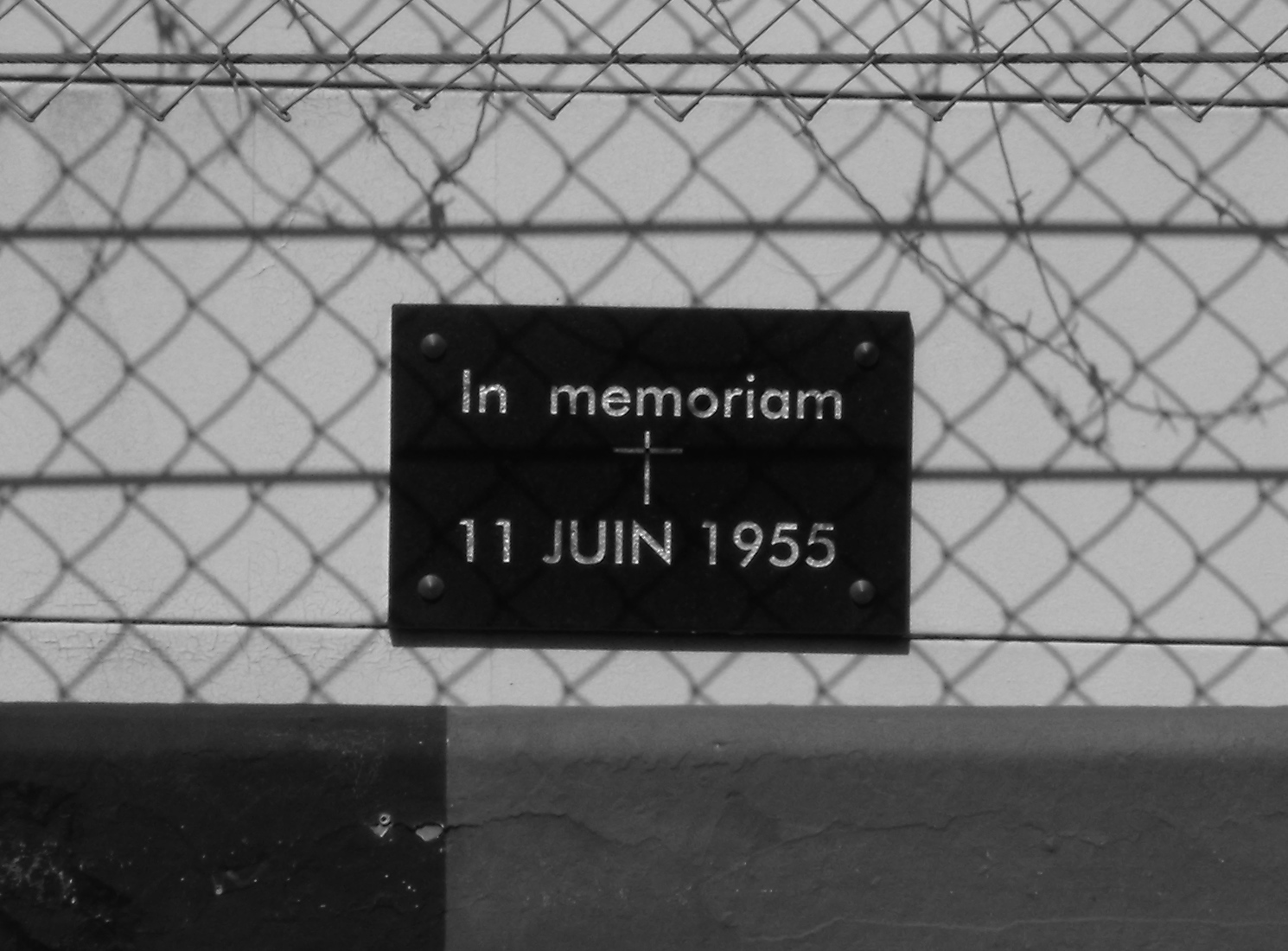
Le Mans Memorial Plaque

Hawthorn and the Jaguar team kept racing. With the Mercedes team withdrawn and the Ferraris all out of commission, Jaguar's main competition had gone. Hawthorn and Bueb won the race by a margin of five laps from Aston Martin. The weather had closed in on Sunday morning, and there was no victory celebration. However, a press photograph showed Hawthorn smiling on the podium drinking from the victor's bottle of champagne. The French magazine L'Auto-Journal published it with the sarcastic caption, "À votre santé, Monsieur Hawthorn!" (English: "To your health ('Cheers'), Mr. Hawthorn!")

=== After the race ===
More than 80 spectators, plus Levegh, were killed, either by flying debris or from the fire, with a further 120 to 178 injured. Other observers estimated the toll to be higher. It has remained the most fatal crash in motorsport history. A special Mass was held in the morning in the Le Mans Cathedral for the first funerals of the victims.

The death toll led to an immediate temporary ban on motorsports in France, Spain, Switzerland, West Germany, and other nations, until racetracks could be brought to a higher safety standard. In the United States, the American Automobile Association (AAA) dissolved their Contest Board that had been the primary sanctioning body for motorsport in the US, including the Indianapolis 500, since 1904. It decided that auto racing detracted from its primary goals, and the United States Automobile Club was formed to take over the race sanctioning and officiating.

Most countries lifted their racing bans within a year after the disaster. France, as the host of Le Mans, lifted their complete ban on 14 September 1955. On that date, the Ministry of the Interior released new regulations for racing events and codified the approval process that future racing events would need to follow. In contrast, Switzerland's ban persisted for more than 60 years. This forced Swiss racing promoters to organize circuit events in foreign countries including France, Italy, and West Germany. In 2003, the Federal Assembly of Switzerland started a discussion about whether this ban should be lifted. The discussion focused on traffic policy and environmental questions rather than on safety. On 10 June 2009, the Ständerat (upper house of the Swiss parliament) defeated a proposal to lift the ban for the second time. In 2015, the ban was relaxed for electric vehicles only, such as cars involved in Formula E electric racing. The ban was fully lifted in May 2022, officially taking effect in July 2026.

The next round of the World Sportscar Championship at the Nürburgring was cancelled, as was the Carrera Panamericana. The rest of the 1955 World Sportscar Championship season was completed, with the remaining two races at the British RAC Tourist Trophy and the Italian Targa Florio, although they were not run until September and October, several months after the catastrophe. Mercedes-Benz won both of these events, and was able to secure the constructors championship for the season. Following the achievement, Mercedes withdrew from motorsport.

The crash caused some drivers present, including Americans Fitch (after completing the season with Mercedes), Phil Walters, and Sherwood Johnston, to retire from racing. Macklin also decided to retire after being involved in another fatal crash, during the 1955 RAC Tourist Trophy race at Dundrod Circuit. Fangio never raced at Le Mans again. At the Circuit de la Sarthe, the audience stands at the pits were demolished.

Much recrimination was directed at Hawthorn, saying that he had suddenly cut in front of Macklin and slammed on the brakes near the entrance to the pits, forcing Macklin to take evasive action into the path of Levegh. This became the semi-official pronouncement of the Mercedes team and Macklin's story. The Jaguar team, in turn, questioned the fitness and competence of Macklin and Levegh as drivers. Initial media accounts were shown to be inaccurate by subsequent analysis of photographic evidence conducted by Road & Track editor (and 1955 second-place finisher) Paul Frère in 1975. Additional details emerged when the stills reviewed by Frère were converted to video form.

The media also speculated on the violent fire that engulfed the wreck, which intensified when fire marshals poured their water-based extinguishers on the flames. They suggested that Mercedes-Benz had tampered with the official fuel-supply with an explosive additive, but the intensity of the fire was due instead to the magnesium-alloy construction of the chassis. Neubauer got the French authorities to test residual fuel left in the wreck's fuel injection, and the result vindicated the company.

Opinions differed amongst the other drivers as to who was directly to blame for the crash, and such differences remain to this day. Macklin claimed that Hawthorn's move to the pits was sudden, causing an emergency that led him to swerve into Levegh's path. Years later, Fitch claimed, based on his own recollection and from what he heard from others, that Hawthorn had caused it. Dewis ventured the opinions that Macklin's move around Hawthorn was "careless", and that Levegh was "not competent" to meet the demands of driving at the speeds the 300SLR was capable of.

Both Jaguar and Mercedes-Benz issued official statements, mainly in self-defence against the accusations levelled against them and their drivers. Neubauer limited himself to suggesting improvements to the pit straight and making pit-stops safer.

Macklin, on reading Hawthorn's 1958 autobiography, Challenge Me the Race, objected when he found that Hawthorn now disclaimed all responsibility for the crash without identifying who had caused it, presuming that Hawthorn's implication was that Macklin had been responsible, and began a libel action. The action was still unresolved when Hawthorn was killed in a non-racing crash on the Guildford bypass in 1959 while overtaking a Mercedes-Benz in his Jaguar.

The official government inquiry into the accident called officials, drivers, and team personnel to be questioned and give evidence. The wreckage was examined, tested and returned to Mercedes-Benz nearly twelve months after the catastrophe. In the end, the enquiry ruled that no specific driver was responsible for the crash, and that it was merely a "terrible" racing incident. The death of the spectators was blamed on inadequate safety standards for the track design. Tony Rolt and other drivers had been raising concerns about the pit straight since 1953.

=== Legacy ===
Over the next year, the Automobile Club de l'Ouest (ACO) set about making extensive track improvements and infrastructure changes at the Circuit de la Sarthe—the pit straight was redesigned and widened to remove the kink just before the start-finish line, and to give room for a deceleration lane. The pits complex was pulled down and rebuilt, giving more room to the teams, but thereby limiting spaces to 52 starters rather than the previous 60. The grandstand was demolished and rebuilt with new spectator terraces and a wide ditch between them and the racetrack. Track safety technology and practices evolved slowly until F1 driver Jackie Stewart organized a campaign to advocate for better safety measures ten years later. Stewart's campaign gained momentum after the deaths of Lorenzo Bandini and Jim Clark.

American John Fitch became a major safety advocate and began active development of safer road cars and racing circuits. He invented traffic safety devices currently in use on highways, including the sand-and-air-filled Fitch barrels.

Macklin's Austin-Healey 100 was sold to several private buyers before appearing on the public auction block. In 1969, it was bought for £155 (equivalent to £2,252 in 2025). In December 2011, the car, estimated to raise £800,000 before the auction, was sold for £843,000. The car retained the original engine SPL 261-BN, but was reported to be in 'barn find' condition. It was then restored to its original condition.

Mercedes-Benz withdrew from motorsports until 1985, although the withdrawal had already been decided before the race and had not been caused by the accident. After returning to sports car racing in the mid-1980s, initially as an engine supplier, Mercedes went on to win the 1989 Le Mans race in partnership with Sauber Motorsport. Mercedes went on to compete in the championship during the 1990s as a works team before withdrawing for a second and final time in 1999, following a series of spectacular but non-fatal crashes of the Mercedes-Benz CLR.

== See also ==
- Deadliest Crash: The Le Mans 1955 Disaster, 2009 TV documentary for the BBC
- Le Mans 1955 (film), CG animated short film about the disaster
- 1909 Berlin Velodrome Disaster, in which a pace-setting motorcycle flew into the stands, killing 9 spectators. According to List of racing cyclists and pacemakers with a cycling-related death, by 1929, at least 47 people had died while racing at velodromes.
