= List of awards and nominations received by Cold Feet =

Cold Feet, a British comedy drama television series about the romantic relationships of three couples, won over 20 awards during and after its five-series run from 1998 to 2003.

Nominations include nine British Academy Television Awards (one win), thirteen British Comedy Awards (six wins), and three National Television Awards (two wins). Four of the seven principal actors have received "Best TV Comedy Actor/Actress" nominations at the British Comedy Awards. Creator and principal writer Mike Bullen was presented with the Writer of the Year award at the 2003 British Comedy Awards and Series 3 co-writer David Nicholls received a BAFTA nomination in 2001.

== BAFTA Awards ==
=== British Academy Television Awards ===
Year	Category	Nominee	Result
1998	Best Photography and Lighting (Fiction/Entertainment)	Peter Middleton	Nominated
1999	Best Drama Series	Mike Bullen and Christine Langan	Nominated
1999	Best Original Television Music	Mark Russell	Nominated
1999	Best Graphic Design	Peter Terry, Matt Howarth and Susan Voudouris	Nominated
1999	Best Editing (Fiction/Entertainment)	Tim Waddell	Nominated
2000	Best Actress	Fay Ripley	Nominated
2001	Best Drama Series	Mike Bullen, Andy Harries, Spencer Campbell	Won

=== British Academy Television Craft Awards ===
Year	Category	Nominee	Result
2000	New Director: Fiction	Jon Jones	Nominated
2000	New Writer: Fiction	David Nicholls	Nominated

== British Comedy Awards ==
Year	Category	Nominee	Result
1999	Best TV Comedy Drama	Series 1	Won
1999	Best TV Comedy Actor	James Nesbitt	Nominated
1999	Best TV Comedy Actress	Fay Ripley	Nominated
2000	Best TV Comedy Drama	Series 2	Won
2000	Best TV Comedy Actor	James Nesbitt	Won
2001	Best TV Comedy Drama	Series 3	Nominated
2001	Best TV Comedy Actor	James Nesbitt	Nominated
2001	Best TV Comedy Actor	John Thomson	Nominated
2001	Best TV Comedy Actress	Hermione Norris	Nominated
2001	People's Choice Award		Won
2002	Best Comedy Drama	Series 4	Nominated
2003	Best TV Comedy Drama	Series 5	Won
2003	Writer of the Year	Mike Bullen	Won

== Broadcast Awards ==
Year	Category	Nominee	Result
2000	Comedy	Series 1	Nominated
2001	Drama: Series or Serial	Series 2, Episode 5	Won
2004	Drama: Series or Serial	Series 5	Nominated

== National Television Awards ==
Year	Category	Nominee	Result
2002	Most Popular Comedy Programme		Won
2003	Most Popular Comedy Performance	James Nesbitt	Won
2003	Most Popular Comedy Programme		Nominated
2017	Most Popular Drama Programme		Nominated

== Royal Television Society awards ==
=== Programme Awards ===
Year	Category	Nominee	Result
1998	Situation Comedy & Comedy Drama		Won
2000	Situation Comedy & Comedy Drama		Nominated

=== Craft & Design Awards ===
Year	Category	Nominee	Result
1998	Tape & Film Editing (Entertainment & Situation Comedy)	Edward Mansell	Nominated
2000	Production Design (Drama)	Chris Truelove	Nominated
2000	Sound (Drama)	Nick Steer, John Rutherford, Jack Dardis and Andy Wyatt	Won

== Television and Radio Industries Club Awards ==
Year	Category	Nominee	Result
2000	TV Comedy Programme of the Year		Won
2002	Drama Performer of the Year	James Nesbitt	Won

== Other awards ==
Year	Award	Category	Nominee	Result
1999	Banff Rockie Award	Best Comedy	Series 1, Episode 3	Nominated
1999	Broadcasting Press Guilds Award	Best Entertainment		Won
1999	Golden Rose of Montreux		Series 1, Episode 3	Nominated
1999	New York Festival Award	Television Entertainment Programs (Drama) Gold World Medal	Series 1, Episode 6	Won
2000	Le Nombre d'Or Award		Series 2, Episode 4	Nominated
2001	International Emmy Award	Drama		Nominated
2001	Banff Rockie Award	Continuing Series	Series 3, Episode 6	Nominated
