= List of films set in Manchester =

This is a partial list of films set in and around Manchester and Salford(*), England:

- Spare Time (1939)
- My Son, My Son! (1940)
- Love on the Dole (1941) (*)
- The Man in the White Suit (1951)
- Hobson's Choice (1954) (*)
- Hell Is a City (1960)
- A Taste of Honey (1961) (*)
- A Kind of Loving (1962)
- Billy Liar (1963)
- The Family Way (1966) (Bolton)
- The White Bus (1967)
- Charlie Bubbles (1967)
- Spring and Port Wine (1970)
- The Lovers (1973)
- The Living Dead at the Manchester Morgue (1974)
- Yanks (1979) (Oldham)
- The Wind in the Willows (1983)
- A Tale of Two Toads (1989)
- Naked (1993)
- Raining Stones (1993)
- Velvet Goldmine (1998)
- East is East (1999) (*)
- There's Only One Jimmy Grimble (2000) (Oldham)
- The Alcohol Years (2000)
- The Parole Officer (2001)
- 24 Hour Party People (2002)
- 28 Days Later (2002)
- Millions (2005)
- Control (2007)
- Looking for Eric (2009)
- Bog Standard (2010)
- Blue Moon Rising (2010)
- Weekender (2011)
- The Rochdale Pioneers (2012) (Rochdale)
- Spike Island (2012)
- Brothers' Day (2015)
- Finding Fatimah (2017)
- The Hitman's Bodyguard (2017) (Segment)
- Peterloo (2018)
- Manchester in the 1970s (2022)
- Finding Emily (2026)

== See also ==
- List of television shows set in Manchester
