= Cold Feet series 1 =

First series of the British comedy-drama television

Cold Feet
- Series 1
- No. of episodes: 6

Release
- Original network: ITV
- Original release: 15 November – 20 December 1998

Series chronology
- Next → Series 2

The first series of the British comedy-drama television series Cold Feet was first broadcast on the ITV network from 15 November to 20 December 1998. The six episodes were written by series creator Mike Bullen, produced by Christine Langan, and directed by Declan Lowney, Mark Mylod and Nigel Cole. It follows the award-winning pilot episode, broadcast in 1997. The storylines focus on three couples: Adam Williams and Rachel Bradley, Pete and Jenny Gifford, and David and Karen Marsden. They are played by James Nesbitt, Helen Baxendale, John Thomson, Fay Ripley, Robert Bathurst and Hermione Norris respectively.

The storylines follow the three couples as they try to stay faithful to each other. They are held back by issues such as impotence, infidelity, and unplanned pregnancy. Their lives are further complicated by their jobs, money troubles, and moving in together. Bullen embellished the scripts with events from his own personal life. The directors and producers made additional contributions, with the intent to keep the fiction in the programme as true to life as possible. The series was filmed in Greater Manchester in the first half of 1998, using Granada Television's studios, and exterior locations.

Critical reaction to the first episodes was negative, with many reviewers not liking the characters and finding the comedy drama format unusual. As the series progressed, critics' opinions became more positive; the production values rated highly and the fantasy scenes, which became a hallmark of Cold Feet, were well received. An average of eight million viewers watched the series each week. The following year it won awards from the Royal Television Society, the Broadcasting Press Guild and the British Comedy Awards. It was also nominated for the Rose d'Or and a Banff Rockie Award. All six episodes have been released on VHS, DVD and internet media formats.

== Episodes ==
No.	Title	Directed by	Written by	Original release date	Viewers (millions)
1	Episode 1	Declan Lowney	Mike Bullen	15 November 1998	7.47
The end of Jenny's pregnancy approaches, and she becomes increasingly irritated by Pete's enthusiastic preparation for the birth, such as his route maps to the hospital and his expert knowledge of labour. Karen and David's son Josh misbehaves at nursery, leading David to blame their nanny, Ramona (Jacey Salles). Adam and Rachel discuss moving in together but fall out after an argument over whose flat to live in. They put their differences aside when Jenny goes into labour while Pete is playing golf with David. As Rachel drives to pick up Pete, Adam stays with Jenny through the birth of her son, who she and Pete name Adam.
2	Episode 2	Declan Lowney	Mike Bullen	22 November 1998	7.33
Adam and Rachel move into their first home together but he soon moves out when he discovers that she is secretly married. He starts sleeping at Pete and Jenny's but is forcibly evicted to give them room with their new baby. He returns home and meets Kris (Lennie James), Rachel's husband, who she has invited up to Manchester to sort out their divorce. Adam puts up with Kris for a while but eventually pays him £500 to go away, asking him to promise not to tell Rachel. Kris accepts and leaves. Adam is disappointed when Rachel tells him she also paid Kris £500 to leave. Karen takes control of hers and David's finances when his investment in a South African golf course flops.
3	Episode 3	Mark Mylod	Mike Bullen	29 November 1998	7.46
David tells Adam that he is having problems with his sex life, so Adam seeks advice for "a friend" from Pete. Pete assumes Adam's "friend" is actually Adam himself and tells Jenny that Rachel cannot satisfy Adam in bed. Rachel decides she and Adam need to spice up their relationship by disclosing their fantasies to each other—and hers is to have sex in a shop window. He gets the keys to a charity shop from a friend and they sneak in after closing time. The fantasy quickly turns into a nightmare when a ramraider drives a car through the shop window. The police arrive and Adam and Rachel are taken to the police station. Meanwhile, David decides to bypass traditional sex therapy by visiting a prostitute under an assumed name. Pete and Jenny start having sex for the first time since the birth of their baby, acting out her fantasy of a squire and his lowly servant, though his imagination is repeatedly invaded by an attractive barmaid.
4	Episode 4	Mark Mylod	Mike Bullen	6 December 1998	7.44
Karen returns to work in publishing and is tasked with editing the new novel by renowned author Alec Welch (Denis Lawson), for whom she immediately falls. She believes that he feels the same way about her and is excited when a book tour in Liverpool means an overnight stay with him in a hotel. David learns of her plans and concludes that the only way to get back is to sleep with Ramona. Pete's parents, Algernon and Audrey (Sam Kelly and Doreen Keogh) visit him and Jenny, testing Pete's already fraying relationship with his father. In the wake of meeting Welch at the Marsdens' dinner party, Adam decides to start work on a novel about a man's fraying relationship with his father.
5	Episode 5	Nigel Cole	Mike Bullen	13 December 1998	7.91
Following David's attempt to sleep with Ramona and Karen's attraction to Welch, the couple seek marriage guidance counselling. After David causes a scene in her office, the therapist suggests Karen and David go on a "first date" with each other to try to rediscover their attraction to each other. Jenny looks for something apart from the baby to talk to Pete about. Adam seeks to prove to Rachel that he is not a "sad old man" after she finds out he is attracted to their neighbour (Anna Madeley) by organising a lad's night out. Rachel, Karen and Jenny go to a divorce party hosted by a friend of Karen's, while Adam and Pete try to buy some E at a club.
6	Episode 6	Nigel Cole	Mike Bullen	20 December 1998	6.77
David invites the other couples to a charity ball he and Karen are attending, where Jenny lets off a fire extinguisher over Natalie (Lorelei King), David's boss. Natalie demands compensation and a written apology from Jenny, putting David in a difficult position. Rachel tells Karen that she is pregnant but does not know whether the father is Adam or Kris, whom she slept with when he was staying in Manchester. Adam proposes to Rachel, thinking he is the father, and is distraught when he learns he may not be. Rachel decides to move to London until the baby is born, and Adam follows her to the station, imagining a Brief Encounter-esque reconciliation. He tells her that he does not care who the father is. Rachel proves that he does care and leaves anyway.

== Production ==
Cold Feet's pilot episode was intended by Andy Harries, the executive producer and Granada Television's controller of comedy, to lead to a series commission from the ITV network. Poor ratings on its night of broadcast in March 1997 stalled a commission; Harries told writer and creator Mike Bullen and producer Christine Langan to "forget it". ITV's limited portfolio of comedy meant that although it was a ratings failure, the pilot was selected by default to represent the network at the Montreux Television Festival that year. The pilot won the Silver Rose for Humour and the Rose d'Or. ITV still did not commission a series, and in the meantime Granada received offers from the BBC and Channel 4 for a six-part series. In August 1997, David Liddiment, who had chaired the panel of judges at Montreux, became ITV's director of programming and pledged to rebrand the network's comedy output. This included six new episodes of Cold Feet, which were announced that August. Production began in January 1998. Each episode was budgeted at £500,000, a small amount for a 50-minute drama.

=== Cast ===
All six main cast members from the pilot returned for the series; James Nesbitt and Helen Baxendale play Adam Williams and Rachel Bradley, a couple in a fledgling relationship; John Thomson and Fay Ripley play Pete and Jenny Gifford, a married couple whose first child is born in the first episode; Robert Bathurst and Hermione Norris play David and Karen Marsden, an upper-middle-class couple who are considering having a second child. Each had mixed feelings about whether there would be a series commission after the poor reception of the pilot; Ripley did not stop thinking about it, in contrast to Bathurst, who viewed it as just another failed pilot he had done.

Following the resolution of Karen and David's storyline in the pilot, in which David concedes that the couple need to hire a nanny, Jacey Salles was cast as Ramona Ramirez. Salles was a bit-part actress in BBC sitcoms and had previously appeared in the 1998 Granada film The Misadventures of Margaret, which was co-produced by Harries. In her Cold Feet audition she was required to have a loud argument with her boyfriend over the telephone. She embellished this with "a bit of comic bastardisation of the English language" and won the part. Initially contracted for only two episodes, Salles assumed the Marsdens would employ a new nanny every few episodes, though she made two more appearances in the first series and eventually appeared in every series. Lennie James made two guest appearances as Kris Bumstead, though his second appearance in Episode 6 was mostly in the form of flashbacks. James was keen to find out the resolution to the "who's the father?" cliffhanger, reportedly repeatedly asking the producers whether the baby was Kris's. Other actors to make appearances were Denis Lawson as Alexander Welch and Sam Kelly as Algernon Gifford. John Thomson was pleased to work with Kelly, as he was a big fan of 'Allo 'Allo!, a sitcom in which Kelly appeared.

=== Writing ===
Storylines for a potential series had been drafted by writer Mike Bullen during production of the pilot. When production on the series began, producer Christine Langan worked with him to create detailed plots for all six episodes, also acting as a script editor to redraft Bullen's work. Many of the plots were drawn from his own life; Pete and Jenny bringing up their new baby paralleled Bullen and his wife, whose first child was born in late 1997. The scenes where Pete and Jenny attend the antenatal classes were written from Bullen's memory, when he and his wife were "given callipers, forceps and a suction cup to play with". The conclusion of the fourth episode, in which Pete's father dies on the way to his grandson's christening, was suggested by Harries, whose own experience of the death of his father taught him that people rarely have the opportunity to say goodbye to loved ones in real life. Not all storylines were based on real life: For Karen and David's marriage guidance scenes in Episode 5, Bullen consulted the relationship support charity Relate. Actors and directors also had input into the scripts; Bullen's original script for the marriage therapy scenes ended with David shouting and apparently using a fire extinguisher as an offensive weapon. Bathurst was not convinced that was something that his character would do, as David is "too much of a coward to do anything overtly" and would not leave himself so "exposed":

"As David grapples with the fire extinguisher to remove the hose from the barrel, we hear running footsteps approaching. The door is suddenly flung open and two male colleagues of the counsellor's burst open into the room. In a second they take a look at the scene, and we see what they see—the counsellor looking lost, Karen looking shocked, and most significantly, David standing over the counsellor, brandishing a fire extinguisher in an apparently threatening manner. Presuming their colleague to be in danger, the two men hurl themselves at David, knocking him to the ground. He squeals as he goes down, and complains loudly as he's pinned to the floor."
—Episode 5's marriage guidance scene as originally scripted. Robert Bathurst believed that the scene left his cowardly character "exposed", so Mike Bullen rewrote it.

When storylining the six episodes, Bullen and Langan planned to split up Adam and Rachel at the series' climax, as "If [they] had just left them all living happily in their homes in Didsbury, there would be a less compelling reason to revisit them [in the second series]". Harries opposed the idea, believing that the audience would want a happy ending for the characters. However, he allowed the writer and producer to proceed with their idea. Langan and Episode 6 director Nigel Cole wanted Adam to leave after finding out about Rachel's pregnancy. She would have followed him and proven her love to him by singing to him over the PA system of the train—similar to the pilot's conclusion. Bullen thought that this idea was "atrocious", so spent the Easter weekend drafting an end to the series. The genesis of Rachel becoming pregnant, possibly by Kris, came during the filming of the second episode. Langan suggested to Bullen that they return to Rachel's marriage later in the series, using an adage she had learned from working on a soap opera that if the "seeds" of a storyline are sown early on it can pay off later. The Brief Encounter homage was conceived close to filming. Bullen had not seen the film so had to rent it on video before writing the scene.

=== Filming ===
The directors had twelve days to film two episodes each, equating to approximately five minutes of screen-time per day. Langan asked Father Ted director Declan Lowney to helm the first two episodes after his successful direction of the pilot. Lowney declined in order to shoot a film in Ireland with Terence Stamp; production on it was scheduled to begin in October 1997 and would have overrun into Cold Feet's production calendar. Funding for Lowney's film fell through and he took the two episodes of Cold Feet after Langan offered them to him a second time. The other two directors were Mark Mylod and Nigel Cole.

Sets were constructed at Granada's Blue Shed studios in Salford for interior filming, which ran over 14 weeks from March to May. Exterior filming and location shooting was done in and around the city from February. The climax to the first episode—where Rachel drives her Mini across a golf course to pick up Pete—was filmed at Withington Golf Club in West Didsbury. A long lens was used to film the Mini approaching Thomson and Bathurst, making it appear closer to them than it was and avoiding having to drive it on the green. Filming on Episode 1 came close to overrunning, so Lowney filmed most of Jenny's birth scene in one uninterrupted take, encouraging the actors to ad-lib. Ripley wore a prosthetic abdomen to simulate the appearance of pregnancy throughout the episode and had a pubic wig applied for the birth scene. The uncredited baby who played Baby Adam in that scene was a two-week-old child who had been born two weeks premature, giving it the appearance of a new-born baby. The conclusion of the first episode was originally scripted to feature Pete and Adam playing crazy golf indoors. Lowney did not like the scene, so made thirty minutes available at the very end of production and directed Nesbitt and Thomson to just "talk". The scene was used by Bullen and Langan as the basis for an attraction between Adam and Jenny, implied in the sixth episode and developed in the second series.

The scenes of Adam and Rachel having sex in a shop window in the third episode, inspired by one of Bullen's ex-girlfriends, was filmed in an empty shop unit near Piccadilly station. The unit was dressed to look like a charity shop, with various items and the bed added. Mylod and the stunt co-ordinator storyboarded the sequence where the car comes through the shop window before setting it up on location. Nesbitt and Baxendale were switched with stunt doubles and the car was propelled up a ramp through the window. Explosive charges were placed on the glass to achieve a shatter effect. As only one take could be done, Mylod trailed five cameras on the window. Filming ran from 8 p.m. to 6 a.m. the following day. The location was near several clubs and many passers-by inquired what was being filmed. To avoid giving away the plot they were told that Baxendale was filming a bed advertisement, capitalising on her exposure from appearing in Friends.

Another stunt scene was filmed for Episode 6; the charity ball scene was filmed over two days at a Masonic Lodge and concluded with a fight between Jenny and Natalie (played by Lorelei King). The shots of Jenny spraying Natalie with a fire extinguisher were limited to two takes because it took so long to re-apply King's make up. The table that Ripley and King's stunt doubles fall through had its legs weakened, and the glasses on the table were replaced with sugar glass. The Brief Encounter fantasy was filmed at a steam railway near Rochdale. Nigel Cole used the scene as an opportunity to make his mark as a television director. Most of the scene was filmed by Cole and the main crew. Establishing shots were filmed by Langan and the second unit, due to time constraints. The lighting and focus of the fantasy station was intended to be a direct contrast to the harsh modernity of Piccadilly, which appeared in the "real life" scenes.

== Reception ==
=== Broadcast and ratings ===
ITV trailed Cold Feet between 3 and 12 November. The trailer featured clips from the pilot episode, including the scene where Adam sings with a rose clenched between his buttocks. Six people complained to the Independent Television Commission (ITC), the commercial television regulator, about the scene being inappropriate. Their complaints were not upheld; the ITC ruled that the trailer did not breach the programming code, as "the humour of the piece was apparent from the outset". A 96 Sheet billboard advertising campaign also preceded broadcast, featuring the strapline "A comedy about life & all that". The broadcast was sponsored by Cockburn's Port.

The series was broadcast on ITV from 15 November to 20 December 1998. Harries wanted the series to air in the 9 p.m. timeslot but ITV Network Centre wanted it on at 10 p.m. (the same time the pilot had been scheduled), because the 9 p.m. timeslot was traditionally what was referred to as "the ironing slot"—programmes that can be watched without viewers having to concentrate. David Liddiment compromised with Harries and scheduled Cold Feet for a 9.30 p.m. start. The BBC responded by scheduling Andrew Davies' adaptation of Vanity Fair at the same time. The first five episodes aired from 9.30 p.m. but Episode 6 began at 10 p.m. The main target audience was the "upmarket" ABC1's.

Episode 1 averaged 7.47 million viewers over its hour, peaking at 9.2 million with a low point of 6.9 million. The episode ranked as the thirty-fourth most-watched programme of the week and the sixth most-watched drama (excluding soap-operas). The second episode dropped seven places and 1.9% on the previous week with 7.33 million viewers. It recovered to 7.46 million the following week but still managed only fortieth place in the Top 70 most-watched programmes. The fourth week held steady at 7.44 million viewers and fortieth position again. It had its best figures with Episode 5, which was seen by 7.91 million, making thirty-second in the Top 70. The final episode of the series suffered from its schedule change, dropping to fifty-ninth and 6.77 million viewers. Over the six weeks, Cold Feet averaged a 34% audience share, which was six points below ITV's Sunday peak time average.

=== Critical reaction ===
The series was welcomed as "the British Thirtysomething" and there was additional publicity generated off the back of Helen Baxendale's appearances in Friends. The first two episodes did not impress critics; The Independent's Nicholas Barber called Episode 1 "the most depressing programme [he'd] ever seen". Commenting on the ending, he observed that "in comedyland, the police's main duty is to taxi expectant fathers to hospital". Barber concluded his review with positive comments about the rest of the series, singling out Ripley as being "reminiscent of Elaine in Seinfeld". A.A. Gill also criticised that episode's conclusion, comparing it to a Norman Wisdom comedy. On The Late Review, Germaine Greer described Nesbitt's acting as "especially awful" and suggested that the series had been developed by a marketing department.

Critical reaction improved with the third episode; writing in New Statesman, Andrew Billen praised Episode 3 as being "intricately constructed as a farce", and commented positively on Ripley's and Nesbitt's acting. Billen compared the production and fantasy scenes with Thirtysomething and Ally McBeal. In the Evening Standard, following the conclusion of Vanity Fair and prior to the broadcast of Episode 6, Billen wrote, "The style is light, the narrative frequently inconsequential. The men go to the pub and lust after the barmaid. The women meet in the wine bar and make fun of the men for lusting after the barmaid. The great settings are DIY stores, antenatal classes and sitting rooms. Why should anyone be interested? If domestic trivia has now been outlawed by the BBC as a subject for sitcoms and if even soap operas rely on murders and armed sieges to keep up their figures, why should the travails of a set of ex-dinkies have become a minor cult?" He analysed the series in relation to its early-middle-aged viewers being "a forgotten people", comparing the storylines to real-life issues experienced by friends. He concluded:

This is not the world of Ally McBeal. It is not about finding love remedially. This is a world in which too many of us are asking what use is love if you find it too late. Yet somehow, probably because the moral judgments are lightly made, superannuated singletons such as myself can look on and see an advertisement for, rather than a warning against, that famously honourable estate—just as we do when we gaze at the more benign marriages of our friends. In Vanity Fair, Thackeray deliberately wrote a novel without a hero. We respond to Cold Feet because it, on the contrary, does not despise its characters.

Of Episode 6, The Mirror's Charlie Catchpole wrote "Although I wouldn't want to bump into any of these people in a wine bar, I found I really cared about their unravelling relationships, their sad sexual misadventures, their petty jealousies" and concluded by calling the series "Exquisitely written, stylishly produced, superbly performed." In The Times, Paul Hoggart summarised all six episodes as "[walking] a tightrope between satire and sentimentality, frequently falling off on the sugary side", but wrote positively of the writing, directing, acting, and editing. He approved of the deliberately unhappy ending, looking forward to seeing how Rachel's departure would be resolved in the second series. Andy Harries attributed the mixed critical reaction to the unusual timeslot the series was given.

=== Awards ===
It won in the Situation Comedy and Comedy Drama category at the Royal Television Society (RTS) Awards, the Best Entertainment award at the Broadcasting Press Guild Awards, and the award for Best TV Comedy Drama at the 1999 British Comedy Awards. Edward Mansell received an RTS nomination for Best Tape and Film Editing in Entertainment and Situation Comedy. The third episode was nominated for the Golden Rose of Montreux, though did not win. Ian Johnson, the publicist for the series, believed that the European judges did not understand the farcical humour in the episode, noting that the British delegates to the festival were "helpless with laughter". The same episode was nominated for the 1999 Banff Rockie Award for Best Comedy—the only non-American series to receive a nomination in that category. It lost to the Ally McBeal episode "Theme of Life".

== Home media ==
The first two episodes were released on a single VHS tape by Video Collection International and Granada Media on 11 October 1999. The other four episodes were scheduled for release over two more videos, to be released on 1 November and 29 November but were cancelled; the two-tape release of the full series came on 15 November. It was released on 2-disc region 2 DVD by the same companies on 25 September 2000. A re-release, with new packaging and menus, came on 26 March 2006 through Granada Ventures. The DVD was released in Australia on 4 February 2002 and in the United States on 25 January 2005. The pilot and first series were made available as free streaming media on ITV's revamped itv.com website from July 2007 to August 2009. Additionally, it was one of the first batch of series from ITV's archives to be made available for purchase on ITV's iTunes Store shop, introduced in April 2008.
