= Alfred Neubauer =

German racing driver and team manager (1891–1980)

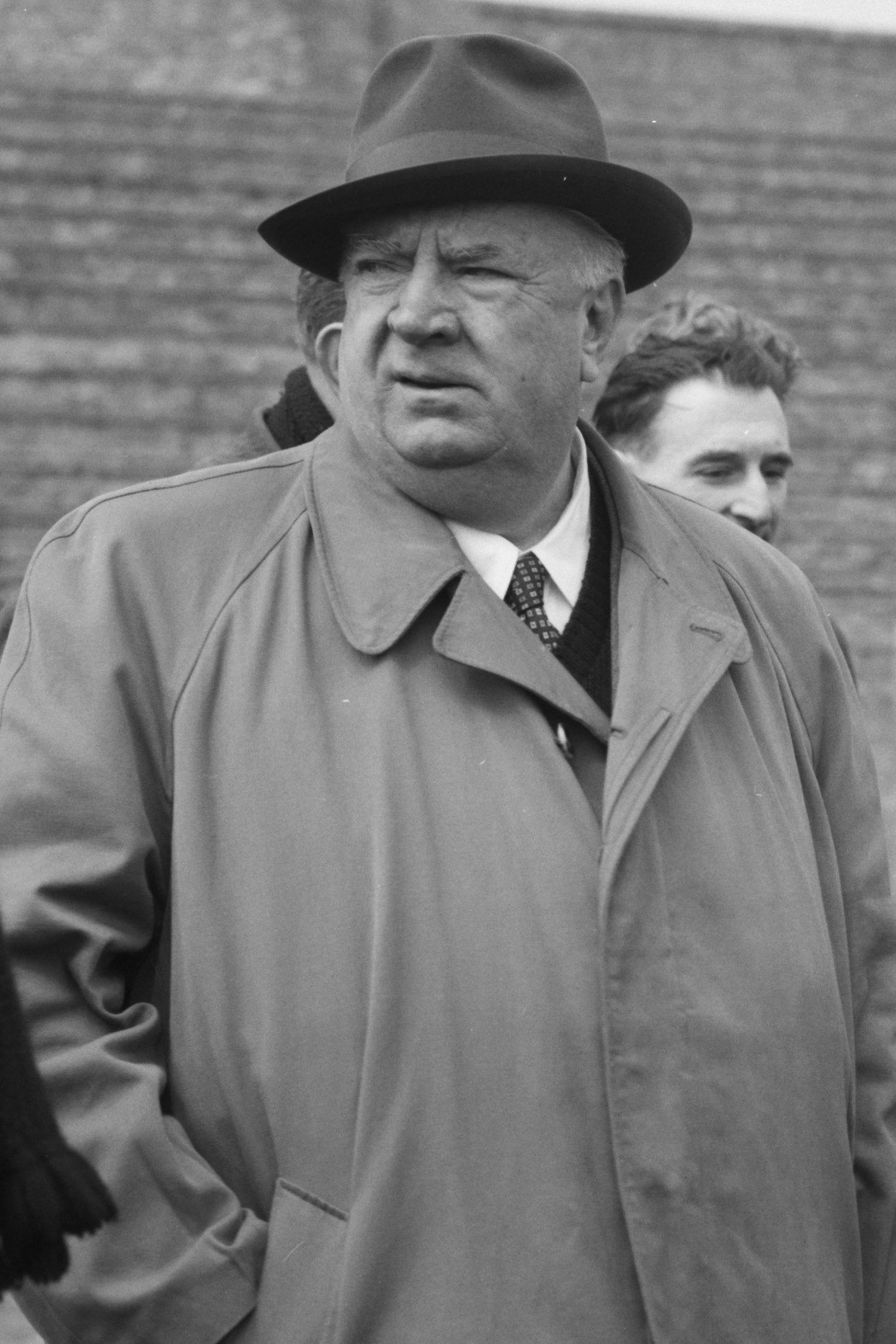
- Neubauer in 1958
- Born: 29 March 1891; Neutitschein, Austria-Hungary
- Died: 21 August 1980 (aged 89); Aldingen, West Germany

Alfred Neubauer (29 March 1891 – 21 August 1980) was the racing manager of the Mercedes-Benz Grand Prix team from 1926 to 1955.

== Biography ==
Neubauer's father, Karl Neubauer, was a furniture-maker in Neutitschein (Czech: Nový Jičín), which then was part of the Austro-Hungarian Empire. Karl christened his only son Alfred, but the child quickly became known to family and friends as Friedl.

Neubauer used to repair motor vehicles while he was an officer during his service in the Imperial Austrian army. After the First World War, he joined the Austrian car manufacturer Austro-Daimler, where Ferdinand Porsche appointed him to be chief tester. From 1922 onwards, Neubauer also drove in races, although without any great success. In 1923, when Ferdinand Porsche moved to the Daimler Works at Stuttgart (Daimler-Benz was not founded until 1926), he took Neubauer with him. In 1926, recognizing that he himself was not a great racing driver, Neubauer got an inspiration that let him create the position of racing team manager (Rennleiter).

Racing drivers in those days being isolated from the outside, they often did not know their position in a race. Occasionally a driver would learn that he had won after a race merely by surprise. To overcome this situation, Alfred Neubauer devised a well thought-out system, with flags and boards, to give his drivers more tactical information. When he tried out the system for the first time at the 1926 Solituderennen on 12 September 1926, the chief steward demanded angrily that he leave the track, since his 'antics' were irritating the drivers. To Neubauer's explanation that he was the Rennleiter, the organizer responded: 'Are you mad? I'm the Rennleiter' (Rennleiter can also mean "race director").

The Mercedes-Benz team was winning races with SS and SSK racing cars, frequently in the hands of Rudolf Caracciola, a strong driver during those days. Neubauer's contribution lay in the strict training of the pit crew, which gave the team a time advantage over its rivals.

Neubauer's organization at the Mille Miglia in 1931 was a master stroke. To reach each staging post before Caracciola arrived, he repeatedly criss-crossed Italy with his team.

According to Neubauer, the origin of the Silver Arrows phrase was due to the cars being overweighted at their first race. Neubauer's story states that the rules prescribed a weight limit of 750 kg, whilst one day before the new cars' first race they weighed in at 751 kg. This led to Neubauer and Manfred von Brauchitsch eventually coming up with the idea of removing the cars' white paint. The silver-coloured aluminium bodywork was exposed, and the Silver Arrows were born. However, this story is a fabrication by Neubauer himself, a well-known raconteur. The debut race was run to Formula Libre rules, meaning there was no weight limit. Additionally, there are no reports or photographs from the time suggesting that the cars were ever run in white paint.

== Silver Arrows ==
The Silver Arrows years were dominated by German racing cars and the rivalry between Mercedes-Benz and Auto Union. In its most successful phase, the Mercedes-Benz team's regular drivers were Rudolf Caracciola, Hermann Lang, Manfred von Brauchitsch, and Richard Seaman.

After the Second World War, Mercedes-Benz was anxious to return to racing as soon as possible, but a new formula was announced for 1954, and there was insufficient time to produce a new model. As a compromise solution, the design of the Mercedes-Benz 300 was adapted. This resulted in a new racing car, the Mercedes-Benz 300SL.

With this car, Neubauer achieved victories at the Carrera Panamericana and the Le Mans 24-hour race. When Mercedes-Benz cars returned to Grand Prix racing in 1954, the new Silver Arrows proved to be as superior as those produced before the war. Juan Manuel Fangio was World Champion in 1954 and 1955.

Probably Neubauer's worst day as racing manager was at Le Mans in 1955, when a Mercedes-Benz 300 SLR driven by Frenchman Pierre Levegh, was catapulted into the crowd, killing more than 80 people including Levegh. After consultation with Stuttgart, Neubauer withdrew the remaining cars from the event.

After the shock of Le Mans, Mercedes-Benz withdrew from racing altogether, and Alfred Neubauer retired.

Neubauer died on 21 August 1980 in Aldingen, West Germany.
