= Deadliest Crash: The Le Mans 1955 Disaster =

- Screenplay by: Philip Goulding
- Directed by: Richard Heap
- Country of origin: United Kingdom
- Original language: English

Production
- Producer: Bigger Picture Films
- Running time: 60 minutes

Original release
- Network: BBC Four
- Release: 16 May 2010

Deadliest Crash: The Le Mans 1955 Disaster is a 1-hour documentary film made by Bigger Picture Films for the BBC in 2009. It was originally aired on BBC Four on Sunday, 16 May 2010, and was later repeated on BBC Two and BBC Four. The programme tells the story of the 1955 Le Mans disaster in which Pierre Levegh's Mercedes 300 SLR smashed into the crowd, killing 83 people and injuring 120 more. It includes spectator photographs and film together with computer modelling of the track and the cars involved in the crash to analyse how it came to happen.

== Documentary ==
Deadliest Crash includes film and stills from the race as well as eyewitness accounts; one spectator's roll of film was reconstructed for the programme. Seeking to establish what caused the disaster, it employs computer modelling to argue that the design of the track, with a curve creating a "pinch point", was the primary cause and not any of the three drivers involved, Levegh, Lance Macklin, with whose car Levegh collided, or Mike Hawthorn, the eventual winner who was widely blamed.

== Reception ==
The Times's Joe Clay called the documentary an "excellent film". Ceri Radford of The Daily Telegraph called it "brash but fascinating" and "a cross between a video nasty and a mind-boggling trip back in time to a past that wasn't just another country, but a different planet". Writing in Autoweek in 2017, Wesley Wren also called it a "must-watch" for fans of motor sports but noted that some viewers might find the "graphic detail" in the second half "disturbing".

In 2020, writing on Hawthorn's career, the historian Jonathan Summers saw Deadliest Crash as reflecting a "consensus [that has] emerged in recent years" that the drivers were not to blame for the crash; Wren in Autoweek noted that changes were made before the next running of the race, and Radford wrote in The Daily Telegraph that from the film "you can see why [Health and safety and PR] became necessary". But in a review in The Independent, Robin Scott-Elliot saw the film as "dramatically shift[ing] the blame" from Levegh to Hawthorn.

== Awards ==
Deadliest Crash was a BBC Top Gear DVD of the Month and won a Best Documentary Reportage award for 2009 at the Sport Movies & TV – Milano International FICTS Fest. It was nominated for the Grierson Award for Best History Documentary.
