= Ian Johnson (publicist) =

Ian Johnson is a public relations manager based in London, specialising in online, television and film publicity. Since launching IJPR in 2006 the company has launched global publicity, social media and awards campaigns for shows as diverse as Killing Eve, The Crown, Call The Midwife, His Dark Materials, Friday Night Dinner and The Missing.

IJPR Media handles social media campaigns for The Last Kingdom, His Dark Materials, A Discovery Of Witches, Bad Wolf, Left Bank Pictures, BAFTA Cymru and Dame Helen Mirren.

The company represents Bad Wolf, Big Talk, CPL, Hartswood Films, Left Bank Pictures, Neal Street Productions, New Pictures, Sid Gentle and The Imaginarium. In the early 1990s, Johnson worked in the Channel 4 Press Office. In 1992 he was part of the launch Press Office team for Carlton Television. From 1996 to 2001 Johnson handled publicity for LWT/Granada Television, launching Cold Feet, Popstars and unit publicity for the film Bloody Sunday. At the BBC, Johnson was Head of Publicity for Drama, Entertainment and Film from 2001 to 2004 (during which time he worked closely with Jane Tranter) and was Head Of Special Projects in Publicity from 2004 to 2006.

He founded Ian Johnson Publicity Limited in 2006. Specialising in high-end Drama including Wallander and Call the Midwife, Ian Johnson Publicity has since expanded to the United States working on programs with Starz, HBO and Showtime.

== Television ==
- Killing Eve
- The Crown
- Penny Dreadful
- Call the Midwife
- The Hollow Crown
- Friday Night Dinner
- Long Lost Family
- A League of Their Own
- Siblings
- Youngers
- Da Vinci's Demons
- Strike Back
- Wallander
- Skins
- Rev.
- Him & Her
- Wallander
- Holby City
- Pushing Daisies
- School of Comedy
- Einstein and Eddington
- Murphy's Law
- The Amazing Mrs Pritchard
- Goldplated
- Zen
- Jam & Jerusalem

Johnson also does corporate publicity for some of the UK's leading independent film and television production companies:

- Neal Street Productions
- Left Bank Pictures
- Hartswood Films
- CPL Productions
- Big Talk Productions
