= List of Last Tango in Halifax episodes =

Last Tango in Halifax is a British drama series that began broadcasting on BBC One on 20 November 2012. The first series of Last Tango In Halifax aired between 20 November and 19 December 2012. It was the UK's highest rated new mid-week television drama of 2012 and was re-commissioned for a second series. The second series aired from 19 November 2013 to 24 December 2013. The series was re-commissioned for a third series on 24 December 2013, ahead of the final episode of the second series. The third series aired from 28 December 2014 to 1 February 2015. Following the end of the final episode of series three, the BBC announced that a fourth series had been commissioned. The fourth series was broadcast on 19 and 20 December 2016 and a fifth series in February and March 2020.

== Episodes ==
Series	Episodes	Originally released		Average UK viewers (millions)
Series	Episodes	First released	Last released	Average UK viewers (millions)
1	6	20 November 2012	19 December 2012	7.32
2	6	19 November 2013	24 December 2013	7.10
3	6	28 December 2014	1 February 2015	7.79
4	2	19 December 2016	20 December 2016	7.26
5	4	23 February 2020	15 March 2020	7.11

=== Series 1 (2012) ===
No. overall	No. in series	Title	Directed by	Written by	Original release date	U.K. viewers (millions)
1	1	"Episode 1"	Euros Lyn	Sally Wainwright	20 November 2012	7.30
Recently widowed Celia Dawson (Anne Reid) contacts Alan Buttershaw (Derek Jacobi)—a former romantic interest whom she has not seen for 60 years—on Facebook. Celia's daughter, Caroline (Sarah Lancashire), is surprised by the revelation, though distracted by her own romantic problems involving her adulterous husband, John (Tony Gardner), and her own relationship with a colleague, Kate (Nina Sosanya). Alan and Celia meet in Skipton and immediately rekindle their friendship. Celia's car is later damaged in pursuit of a young man who has stolen Alan's vehicle. Alan's daughter, Gillian (Nicola Walker), and Caroline clash on first encounter after rushing to collect their parents; both are shocked to discover that Alan and Celia plan to marry.
2	2	"Episode 2"	Euros Lyn	Sally Wainwright	27 November 2012	6.78
Caroline is worried her affair with Kate may become public knowledge as she considers taking back her adulterous husband, John. Widowed Gillian, meanwhile, continues a reckless sexual relationship with Paul (Sacha Dhawan), a man half her age. Alan and Celia enjoy the new lease on life they have discovered and decide to buy a new sports car as an engagement present to each other. As the families come together to celebrate Alan and Celia's engagement, Gillian's son, Raff (Josh Bolt), is arrested for assaulting Paul, whilst Caroline's son William (Edward Ashley) reveals that John is still in contact with his lover, Judith (Ronni Ancona). John is consequently abandoned at Gillian's farm as everybody else leaves.
3	3	"Episode 3"	Euros Lyn	Sally Wainwright	4 December 2012	7.51
A badly beaten Paul moves in with Gillian, whilst Raff moves in with his paternal uncle Robbie (Dean Andrews), who blames Gillian for her husband's death. Meanwhile John returns to Caroline's house and they furiously argue about his right to continue living there; their shouting is overheard by an amused Alan and Celia. Caroline confesses to Kate that she finds it difficult to express her emotions honestly. Alan and Celia begin looking at wedding venues. A Church of England vicar discourages them from having a church wedding since neither party has attended services for more than 30 years. Celia and Alan discuss politics and religion and the liberal Alan is surprised by Celia's conservative views. They visit a stately home in Southowram as a possible wedding venue but are locked inside overnight.
4	4	"Episode 4"	Sam Donovan	Sally Wainwright	11 December 2012	7.33
Alan and Celia spend a night in Southowram Hall. Gillian and Caroline are unable to make contact with their parents, neither of whom has a mobile phone signal. Gillian's worry prompts Raff and Robbie to visit and they become closer. Caroline spends the night at Gillian's whilst awaiting news of Alan and Celia and the two women bond over their fears and their respective problems with children and partners. Paul works out that Alan and Celia may have been visiting Southowram Hall and the police eventually find them. Caroline grows frustrated with John and admits to seeing an unnamed other.
5	5	"Episode 5"	Sam Donovan	Sally Wainwright	18 December 2012	7.49
Alan confides his darkest secret to Celia: that when Gillian's less-than-ideal husband Eddie attempted suicide, he did not die immediately, and she refrained from calling an ambulance; because he did not tell that to the police, Alan holds himself partly responsible for the man's death. Under the influence of alcohol, Gillian sleeps with the troubled John. Caroline meanwhile, prepares to go public about her relationship with Kate. Whilst William had suspected the relationship and is happy for her, Lawrence (Louis Greatorex), Caroline's younger son, is upset and confused. Caroline's birthday evening with Kate and her two sons is ruined by the arrival of an extremely drunk Judith, who ends up in accident and emergency. John discovers that Caroline is seeing Kate, and informs Celia.
6	6	"Episode 6"	Sam Donovan	Sally Wainwright	19 December 2012	7.48
Celia refuses to accept Caroline's relationship with Kate; her conservative views shock Alan, who implores her to give Kate a chance. Celia agrees to meet Kate at a dinner party hosted by Caroline. However, Celia's orthodox attitude towards Kate divides the evening guests, leading Alan to call off the wedding, and drives a wedge between Caroline and Kate. Caroline and Celia have a blazing row, trading insults and expletives. Celia realizes that her behavior had made her daughter unhappy and visits Kate, apologizing for her own behavior and imploring Kate to give Caroline another chance. Alan, meanwhile, suffers a heart attack. Celia realizes that she may have lost everything and rushes to his bedside. They reconcile and decide the wedding will go ahead. The first series ends with a flashback to 60 years ago, showing the teenage Alan (Nico Mirallegro) asking teenage Celia (Amelia Young) on a date, just as the present-day Alan regains consciousness. Prior to the closing credits, a dedication to Alec Walker (1929–2009), who inspired the character of Alan Buttershaw, is shown.

=== Series 2 (2013) ===
No. overall	No. in series	Title	Directed by	Written by	Original release date	U.K. viewers (millions)
7	1	"Episode 1"	Euros Lyn	Sally Wainwright	19 November 2013	7.42
Alan recuperates in hospital from his heart attack. Meanwhile, Gillian is contacted by John, who claims to have fallen in love with her. Unsettled, Gillian confesses to Caroline that she had a one night stand with John. Alan and Celia decide to get married as quickly as possible, with minimum fuss, and book an appointment at the register office. After finding out about Gillian's sexual encounter with John, Alan tells her that both he and his late wife were ashamed of her promiscuity, mentioning an abortion she had at age fifteen. At the end of the episode Gillian discovers Alan and Celia's appointment card for the register office on the morning of their wedding.
8	2	"Episode 2"	Euros Lyn	Sally Wainwright	26 November 2013	7.60
Alan and Celia get married, persuading two passersby to act as witnesses. Gillian turns up at the register office and expresses her feelings of hurt and rejection at not being invited to the ceremony. She is convinced that Alan and Celia think less of her than Caroline's family because of their differing social class. Caroline seeks to secure funds to buy John out of their house. To achieve this, she needs financial support from both Celia and Kate, and asks Kate to move in with her. Kate tells Caroline that, because she is nearing her 42nd birthday, she wants a baby of her own before it is too late. Gillian discovers that Raff's girlfriend Ellie (Katherine Rose Morley) is eight months pregnant. Alan and Celia arrive to provide support, and after Ellie goes into labour, Alan welcomes a great-granddaughter.
9	3	"Episode 3"	Euros Lyn	Sally Wainwright	3 December 2013	5.96
Maurice (Roy Barraclough) is hurt by Alan having married quietly without inviting his friends. Later, Celia relays to Robbie that Gillian had an abortion at the age of 15; he realises it was his fetus she aborted, causing fractures in their relationship. Meanwhile, Kate tells Caroline she has chosen her friend, Greg, as a sperm donor, while Alan and Celia plan to buy a bungalow. With Robbie absent, and Raff and Ellie neglecting the baby, Gillian is left to look after her granddaughter. John arrives to support her, and she tells him of her doubts about Robbie's suitability for her, given the fact she did not take the necessary action to prevent Eddie's death. Alan tells Celia that Gillian had actually killed Eddie with a block of wood following Eddie's apparent suicide attempt.
10	4	"Episode 4"	Jill Robertson	Sally Wainwright	10 December 2013	7.15
Alan muses about whether or not the coroner's verdict of suicide regarding Eddie was correct. On what was supposed to be a romantic birthday weekend getaway, Kate is angered by Caroline's continuing reluctance to publicly acknowledge her and Kate's relationship. Kate and Greg reminisce about their university days, excluding Caroline, and Caroline reacts badly. Kate tells her the next morning that she believes Caroline is too old to change, and their relationship is over, having never properly started. Judith arrives at Gillian's house and accuses John of plagiarism, as his novel was inspired by her idea to write a novel based on Celia and Alan's romance. John's infatuation and one night stand with Gillian is revealed in front of Robbie, inciting Robbie to punch John and walk out again. At Caroline's house, Celia and Alan deal with a drunken Lawrence and a shaken William, who has been assaulted at a cashpoint. Alan is devastated by the news of Maurice's sudden death. At the wake, he and Celia decide to marry a second time so that this time they can share the day with family and friends.
11	5	"Episode 5"	Jill Robertson	Sally Wainwright	17 December 2013	7.06
Three months after the previous episode, William leaves for university, and Lawrence tells his mother he wants to live with his dad, who is now co-habitating with a pregnant Judith. Gillian is jealous of Robbie's new partner, Cheryl (Rachel Leskovac). Kate reveals she is twelve weeks pregnant; though Caroline is restrained in her presence, she is later overcome with emotion. Gillian volunteers her and Caroline's services to plan Alan and Celia's second wedding. Alan and Celia visit Celia's estranged sister, Muriel (Gemma Jones), whom Celia fell out with when Muriel married a man whom Celia had been attracted to. After a day out together researching the wedding, a drunken Gillian tells Caroline she deliberately killed her husband and staged his suicide, as she could take no more of his abuse and feared he'd one day kill her.
12	6	"Episode 6"	Jill Robertson	Sally Wainwright	24 December 2013	7.40
Caroline promises Gillian she will keep her secret. Caroline implores Kate to give her another chance and let her learn from her mistakes. When Kate is rushed to hospital, Caroline drops everything to check that Kate and her unborn baby are safe and well. Alan visits his first wife's grave and talks about Celia, seeking her blessing. In the days before the wedding, Alan's brother, Ted (Timothy West), makes a surprise appearance from New Zealand. At Alan's stag party, Alan and Raff encourage Robbie to pursue Gillian, as they believe they are right for each other. Meanwhile, Celia tells Muriel of her own unhappy first marriage. The wedding takes place on Christmas Eve, with Kate playing the piano at Celia's request, and Caroline taking on the traditional duties of the bride's father. At the wedding dance, Gillian flirts with Robbie and Kate asks Caroline to dance, with the two women promising to commit to each other. The episode ends with Alan and Celia, and Kate and Caroline happy together, whilst Gillian cuts in on Robbie and Cheryl on the dance floor.

=== Series 3 (2014–2015) ===
No. overall	No. in series	Title	Directed by	Written by	Original release date	U.K. viewers (millions)
13	1	"Episode 1"	Nigel Cole	Sally Wainwright	28 December 2014	7.89
On Valentine's Day, Alan and Celia enjoy a romantic dinner, whilst Caroline proposes to a now heavily pregnant Kate, and Gillian goes on a date with a man named Gary (Rupert Graves). Gary tells Gillian that he is Alan's son, the product of a brief affair Alan had in the 1960s. Both Caroline and Alan are afraid of how Celia might take the news, given the unhappiness caused by her first husband's adultery. The news of Caroline and Kate's upcoming wedding brings out Celia's latent prejudices, and Lawrence is subjected to an incident of homophobic bullying at school. John seeks solace from Caroline and his family in the wake of Judith's miscarriage, whilst Gillian sleeps with Robbie despite his ongoing relationship with Cheryl. At the end of the episode, Gillian takes Celia shopping for a wedding outfit so that Alan can go to meet Gary without Celia knowing.
14	2	"Episode 2"	Nigel Cole	Sally Wainwright	4 January 2015	7.47
Alan meets Gary and the two get along very well. Meanwhile, as Judith has moved away to St Albans, John moves into Caroline's spare room, making Kate feel uncomfortable. Gillian loses her job at the supermarket after Cheryl publicly humiliates her. Celia is devastated after Alan reveals his secret child, infuriated by his dishonesty and unsure of how to progress in their marriage. She refuses to meet Gary after he invites all of Alan's family to dinner, and moves back to Harrogate to have some space and be close to Caroline. Alan, Raff, and Gillian are impressed by Gary's success after learning how as a young entrepreneur he eventually built a multi-million-pound business. Despite Caroline's efforts to counter her mother's despondency, Celia rejects both Alan and Caroline, refusing to attend her daughter's wedding. Caroline warns her mother that this may irrevocably damage their relationship. When Alan turns up alone at the register office prior to the wedding, Caroline lashes out at him, telling him his presence is not welcome without Celia—something she had also said (almost word-for-word) to her own father when he showed up at her doctoral graduation and Celia didn't.
15	3	"Episode 3"	Nigel Cole	Sally Wainwright	11 January 2015	7.43
Caroline and Kate exchange vows and rings in the company of friends, colleagues and Caroline's elder son, William (now Dean Smith). Robbie tells Gillian he wants to marry her and wishes to support her financially. After John drives Alan back to the farm, he gets drunk with Gillian, and they sleep together again. Following the departure of the wedding guests, Celia visits Caroline and enquires about her day. Caroline is angered and hurt by her mother's behaviour and uninterested in Celia's marital problems. The next day, Gillian tells John he is a bad influence on her, and she cannot be with him, opting instead to accept Robbie's proposal. Celia attempts to repair her relationship with Alan by meeting Gary and spending the afternoon with Alan's extended family. Caroline is distraught when Kate is critically injured in a car accident. Alan and Celia rush to support and console her, and Caroline makes amends with Alan following her words to him at the wedding. They learn the baby has been delivered safely; Caroline breaks down in tears after hearing further information from the surgeon.
16	4	"Episode 4"	Syd Macartney	Sally Wainwright	18 January 2015	7.84
On the morning of Kate's funeral, Caroline decides to name their baby Flora Grace. At the wake, Caroline bonds with Kate's mother (Michelle Hurst), but is perturbed when Greg offers to provide paternal support to her and Kate's child. Meanwhile, Celia is furious when she catches Alan sneaking a cigarette, in spite of his heart condition. Caroline, struggling with her bereavement, leans on Celia for emotional support. Raff is delighted that Gillian and Robbie are getting married, though Gillian is anxious for Caroline to keep her secret. Gary becomes increasingly paranoid when neither Gillian nor Alan is willing to get in touch. Unwilling to give up her career or place too much of a burden on her elderly parents, Caroline hires ex-pupil Holly (Cara Theobold) to be Flora's nanny.
17	5	"Episode 5"	Syd Macartney	Sally Wainwright	25 January 2015	7.94
Lawrence's behaviour at school becomes disruptive, leading Caroline to suspend him. Alan starts to distance himself from Gary when Gary's behaviour becomes increasingly needy and obsessive. Gary offers to pay for Gillian's wedding and to put Raff through an accountancy apprenticeship in his business, though she is unhappy with both suggestions. Meanwhile, Caroline is incredulous when John suggests they give their relationship another go. When Holly is revealed to be an alcoholic, Caroline invites Greg, Flora’s biological father and a successful comic book artist, to become Flora's live-in sitter. Greg bonds with Flora, impresses both Caroline and Celia, and manages to win round Lawrence to his half-sister. Gillian discovers that Gary has divulged the secret of his true parentage to the press, which greatly embarrasses Alan.
18	6	"Episode 6"	Syd Macartney	Sally Wainwright	1 February 2015	8.16
Caroline prepares to drive Gillian to the wedding, but her step-sister has cold feet. Flashbacks reveal that she accepted Gary's offer of a lavish wedding out of guilt at Alan's having rejected him and because she cheated on her fiancé—twice once with a colleague (Jaz Martin) after Robbie insulted her, and again with John. She has also learnt that Robbie knew that his brother had abused her and did not intervene. After a series of delays, Caroline, Gillian, and Alan arrive at the venue. With encouragement from Caroline, Gillian marries Robbie, not wishing to cause a scene or stand him up. Later, Celia helps Alan and Gary make peace, Gary having apologised for his behaviour. Caroline reflects on the tragedy of her own short-lived marriage, realising just how much she loves Flora and that she cannot keep holding on to the image of Kate's "ghost". As she prepares to visit Kate's mother in New York, Gary upgrades Alan and Celia's tickets for their belated honeymoon to New Zealand and Australia, whilst Gillian and Robbie are to have use of his apartment in Mallorca for their own honeymoon.

=== Series 4 (2016) ===
Series Four consists of two episodes featured as Christmas Specials.

No. overall	No. in series	Title	Directed by	Written by	Original release date	U.K. viewers (millions)
19	1	"Episode 1"	Juliet May	Sally Wainwright	19 December 2016	7.30
Gillian believes she's being haunted by Eddie. A new headship for Caroline means the family must move. Their new home in Huddersfield is a ramshackle farmhouse. When Alan tries to discuss his burial wishes with Gillian, things become problematic.
20	2	"Episode 2"	Juliet May	Sally Wainwright	20 December 2016	7.21
As she continues to be haunted by Eddie's death, Gillian makes a major decision about her life. Caroline finally reveals to Gillian the truth about her acceptance of her new position. Alan must face his fears on the night of Celia's play.

=== Series 5 (2020) ===
No. overall	No. in series	Title	Directed by	Written by	Original release date	U.K. viewers (millions)
21	1	"Episode 1"	Gareth Bryn	Sally Wainwright	23 February 2020	7.63
Alan and Celia, seven years into their marriage, have recently moved into a desirable bungalow with stunning views across the Calder Valley, yet they aren’t seeing eye to eye. Celia is baffled when Alan applies for a job in a local supermarket, and Alan can’t understand why they need an expensive new kitchen. Alan’s brother, Ted, has booked a last-minute trip from New Zealand, which means more spending to kit out the spare bedroom, and Gillian, already stretched with bank repayments, discovers she has woodworm nibbling at her roof timbers. Having transformed her difficult new school with phenomenal success, a guest appearance by megastar author and John's girlfriend Judith Tyzack threatens to bring a fresh challenge to Caroline’s headship. A phone call from New Zealand gives Alan and Celia pause for thought, and tempers are frayed at Caroline and Gillian’s joint birthday celebration when money becomes the topic of conversation. Meanwhile, Judith presents John with an awkward proposition.
22	2	"Episode 2"	Gareth Bryn	Sally Wainwright	1 March 2020	6.57
Celia is quick to apologise for causing a scene, but with Alan seeking excitement outside the bungalow and Celia seeking it within, their relationship comes under increasing strain. Questions are raised when Ted arrives from overseas with a lifetime's worth of luggage and two young New Zealanders, Mia and Alyssa, in tow. Raff is left speechless when a mural of a giraffe appears unexpectedly on the wall of the barn at Far Slack farm, and Gillian is riddled with old anxieties when it brings unwarranted attention to the barn. Meanwhile, Caroline and Ruth get on like a house on fire until Caroline lets her guard down and receives an unexpected response. As Judith looks to the future, John begins to look the other way. Ted’s return stirs up the past for Alan: when he learns that Ted has bought a one-way ticket, Alan begins to suspect that he isn’t telling the full story.
23	3	"Episode 3"	Gareth Bryn	Sally Wainwright	8 March 2020	7.10
There’s chaos at the bungalow as work begins to strip out the old kitchen. Alan’s new supermarket job brings an unexpected challenge in the form of Harrison, and an overburdened Celia is called upon to travel by bus. Caroline has cause to question how people see her, and the giraffe continues to torment Gillian, who is pushed to her wits’ end by the return of PC Cheryl. Elsewhere, a hungover Judith has an epiphany, Caroline gains an unwanted lodger, and the truth about Ted’s last-minute trip comes to light.
24	4	"Episode 4"	Gareth Bryn	Sally Wainwright	15 March 2020	7.15
Gillian is pushed to breaking point at the farm, and Caroline finds herself at the heart of an unlikely love triangle. Ellie airs PC Cheryl's suspicions about Eddie, and a guilt-ridden Raff confides a difficult secret to Alan. Ted makes a sentimental journey to the seaside at Bridlington, where he and his beloved wife had their honeymoon, while Alan and Celia find reason to laugh together again. However, sobering news awaits.
