= Caroline Dawson =

Caroline McKenzie-Dawson
- Last Tango in Halifax character
- First appearance: Series 1, Episode 1 (2013)
- Last appearance: Series 5, Episode 4 (2020)
- Created by: Sally Wainwright
- Portrayed by: Sarah Lancashire

In-universe information
- Occupation: Head teacher
- Family: Kenneth Dawson (father; deceased); Celia Buttershaw (mother); Alan Buttershaw (stepfather); Gillian Greenwood (stepsister); Gary Jackson (stepbrother)
- Spouses: John Elliot (divorced); Kate McKenzie (widowed)
- Children: William Elliot; Lawrence Elliot; Flora McKenzie-Dawson
- Relatives: Debbie (aunt); Muriel White (aunt); Martin White (cousin)

Caroline McKenzie-Dawson (née Caroline Dawson and formerly Caroline Elliot) is a fictional character in the BBC One drama series Last Tango in Halifax, portrayed by Sarah Lancashire. The character was created by lead writer and executive producer Sally Wainwright and appears in all 24 episodes of the series, from 20 November 2012 until 15 March 2020. Lancashire was initially unable to commit to the series, but was cast after the production of Betty Blue Eyes she had been starring in closed early.

Caroline, a successful career woman, is introduced as the daughter of protagonist Celia Dawson (Anne Reid), who falls in love again in her mid-seventies. Lancashire states that her mother's second marriage inspires her, a closeted lesbian, to "finally be herself". The first series of Last Tango in Halifax deals with the break-up of Caroline's marriage to John (Tony Gardner) and the establishment of a relationship between Caroline and her colleague Kate (Nina Sosanya). Wainwright had intended Caroline's love life to provide a source of drama and believed a lesbian relationship to be a more interesting story. Caroline's sexuality is a source of contention for the more conservative-minded Celia across the series. Reid noted that their arguments are "vicious"; whilst Lancashire stated that Caroline is "wounded" by her mother's "non-acceptance" after she decides to marry Kate. In the third series, Wainwright decided to kill off Kate, as she felt this was the only way to reconcile Celia with her daughter, leaving Caroline both a widow and single mother.

The character of Caroline received a hugely positive response from LGBTQ women and the media. In 2014, Lancashire won the British Academy Television Award for Best Supporting Actress for the role, having been previously nominated in 2013.

== Development ==
=== Casting ===
Lancashire was initially unavailable to portray Caroline in the series, due to starring in the original West End production Betty Blue Eyes. However, due to the musical closing early Lancashire became available to film the series. Lancashire discerned that the series was "very special" within reading two pages of the script. Other factors that persuaded her to commit to the series included the casting of Anne Reid and Derek Jacobi as the series' protagonists, and the juxtaposition of a heart-warming story with elements of humour. In terms of her character, Lancashire identified with Caroline being "a working woman trying to keep everything under control". She stated the series' ensemble cast was "the closest I’ve come to being in a theatre company on television" due to how well the actors worked together.

The cast had all assumed that Last Tango in Halifax would only run for one series. Filming of the second series clashed with filming of the second series of the BBC One period drama The Paradise, which also starred Sarah Lancashire. This necessitated her having to leave her role in The Paradise halfway through the second series in order to reprise her role as Caroline in Last Tango in Halifax. In an interview in 2013 Lancashire stated that the decision to return to Last Tango in Halifax was the easiest she had made in her working life stating "as an actor you can wait an entire career to be involved in a project like this." In 2014 Wainwright recalled being "blown away" by Lancashire's performances in the rushes for the series, which partly inspired her to script the series Happy Valley in which Lancashire plays the lead role. In December 2014, ahead of the third series, Lancashire stated that she would continue for the series for as long as it runs stating that she found the series "beautifully written" and that she'd "turn up to read two lines a day just to be part of this piece".

=== Characterisation ===
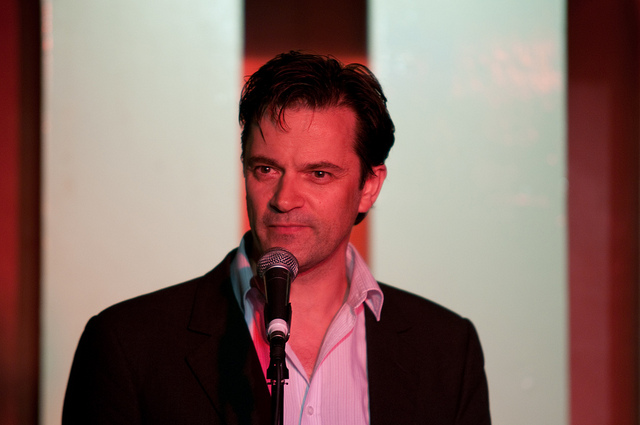
The first series depicts Caroline's marriage to John (Tony Gardner) coming to an end.

Caroline is established as a successful career woman with a background in academia, holding a chemistry degree from Oxford University. The BBC's official website noted that though her marriage is disintegrating by the start of the first series, her career is "going from strength to strength". Explaining how her character ended up married to John (Tony Gardner), Lancashire conjectures that Caroline had been "charmed by his love of words" and that he had been "a romantic who balanced her out". Series 1 sees Caroline struggling to come to terms with her sexuality. Much of her storyline is driven by her need to "be true to herself"; though at one stage she considers re-uniting with her husband, Lancashire explains that "she’s spent so many years having to conform, denying to the outside world who she really is, I think taking him back is her trying to keep that up." She explains that Caroline's outer defence of self-assurance belies her internal fragility; and fears losing her mother. She is initially skeptical about her mother's romance with Alan, though is ultimately liberated by it; Lancashire states that her mother's romance makes Caroline feel she has "'permission' to finally admit to being who she really is". Caroline's sexuality is initially a source of contention for the conservative Celia, who is forced to become more tolerant over the course of the series.

Reid noted that whilst Caroline and Celia have a strong family bond, "their arguments become very vicious". Despite their arguments and falling outs, Lancashire feels that the characters of Celia and Caroline share "a very deep abiding love". The characters of Celia and Alan are inspired by Wainwright's own mother and step-father, and in the first series some scenes involving Caroline are taken from Wainwright's own experiences; such as her discomfort at hearing her elderly mother discuss her sex life and a scene in which she discovers her mother and step-father-to-be eavesdropping on a marital dispute. Whilst Alan and Celia's love story was based loosely on real life, the antagonism between Caroline and Gillian (Nicola Walker) was added to provide dramatic interest.

=== Storyline development ===
The Last Tango in Halifax website promoted Caroline's colleague Kate McKenzie (Nina Sosanya) as someone who "believes that Caroline is the love of her life" and who "could be the key to unlocking her depression". When storylining the series, Wainwright decided that much of the drama would be provided by the characters of Gillian and Caroline having complicated love lives. Wainwright felt that whilst Caroline could have had an affair with a male colleague, this "[would have] been less interesting". Lancashire was initially unaware that her character would become involved in a gay relationship until halfway through filming for the first series, when the director of an episode informed her of the plot twist. In portraying the storyline Lancashire did not let her character's sexuality inform her portrayal, instead focusing on Caroline's "humanity" and her drive to be a "fulfilled human being". Due to the underrepresentation of gay characters on television, Lancashire felt it particularly important that Caroline's experiences would not be portrayed inaccurately. The development of the relationship led to Gerard Gilbert of The Independent describing it as "one of the most normalised lesbian relationships ever shown on the small screen." In the second series Caroline has to go "on quite a journey", before learning to become "out and proud".

By the third series the Caroline and Kate have settled into a "life of domesticity", expecting a baby and planning their wedding. In promoting the series, Lancashire explained that Caroline's happiness is tempered by her becoming "wounded by [an] admission of non-acceptance" from her mother after she refuses to attend Caroline's wedding. Whilst unable to divulge the details of further plot developments, she noted that "catastrophic events" would re-unite Caroline and Celia and allow viewers to "see the full spectrum of who Caroline is." In an interview with Diva magazine, writer Sally Wainwright explained that she felt that she had to kill off the character of Kate following the wedding, as she felt the only way Caroline and Celia could be reconciled would be through a family tragedy. Whilst she had been conflicted over the decision, she felt that it was ultimately the best one for the drama and that it allowed "the performances with the people left behind [to] become increasingly magnetic and extraordinary".

== Appearances ==
Caroline is introduced in Last Tango in Halifax's series premiere, as a successful headmistress dealing with the aftermath of her husband's affair, resulting in her ending her own clandestine relationship with Kate, the latter of which she is "not ready" to reveal. She is shocked to learn that her mother Celia has decided to marry Alan, an old love interest she had recently met for the first time in sixty years. She is also shocked upon discovering that Alan is the father of Gillian, a working-class woman whom Caroline had just insulted for her bad driving. After learning that John is still seeing his lover Judith (Ronni Ancona), Caroline tells him he has no right to carry on living in their marital home. She grows closer to Kate, and explains to her that she finds it hard to be open with her feelings, having long suppressed her emotions. In the following episode, Caroline grows closer to Gillian after their respective parents go missing. She admits to John that she has moved on and begun seeing someone else. When Caroline makes her relationship with Kate official, her eldest son William (Edward Ashley) takes it in his stride, but her younger son Lawrence (Louis Greatorex) is confused and upset. When Judith sees John at Caroline's house, she learns of the relationship and informs John, who in turn informs Celia. Celia is dismayed and refuses to accept her daughter's sexuality, her bigoted words and attitude at a dinner party later drive Kate away. Caroline has an angry argument with her mother, blaming her for her emotional repression and for ruining her chance of happiness with Kate. She reminds her that she had previously tried to come out to her at the age of 18, and that it had been her prejudices that had forced her to live a closeted existence. Celia, realising that she may have ruined her relationship with both her daughter and the liberal-minded Alan, is compelled to ask Kate to give Caroline another chance.

In series 2 (2013) Caroline is surprised to learn that Gillian has slept with John, whom she is in the process of divorcing. When Alan and Celia quietly marry in private, Caroline is pleased for them, though Gillian feels slighted. Wishing to buy John out of their shared house, she asks both Celia and Kate for financial assistance and invites Kate to move in with her. Kate, nearing her 42nd birthday, confides in Caroline that she would like a baby before she gets too old. Caroline takes Kate away for her birthday, though angers her by booking two single rooms. She feels excluded when Kate reminisces with an old university friend, Greg (Marcus Garvey) whom she is using as a sperm donor. The following day, Kate informs Caroline that their relationship is over, as Caroline is too old to change her ways and be comfortable with their relationship. Three months later, Caroline is dejected when William leaves for university and Lawrence declares that he wants to live with his father. She is overcome with emotion after learning that Kate is twelve weeks pregnant. She distracts herself by planning a wedding party for Alan and Celia with Gillian. Caroline becomes the first person to learn that Gillian murdered her ex-husband; she promises to keep this secret. In the series two finale, Caroline tells Kate she has learnt from her mistakes, and implores her to give her a second chance. At Alan and Celia's wedding dance on Christmas Eve, Kate surprises Caroline by asking her to dance; the pair promise to commit to each other before kissing passionately.

In series 3 (December 2014), Caroline asks Kate to marry her, wishing to make their union official. She is faced with hostility both from Celia, who is prejudiced about Caroline's new family unit, and from bullies at her school who target Lawrence. A depressed Celia uses the discovery of Alan's illegitimate son Gary (Rupert Graves) as an excuse not to attend the wedding. When Alan turns up at the wedding alone, Caroline lashes out at him, telling him that there is now no point him being there. Kate and Caroline exchange vows in the company of friends and colleagues. Tragically, Kate is fatally injured in a car-accident the next day, leaving Caroline devastated. Alan and Celia arrive at the hospital to emotionally support Caroline; they learn that Kate's daughter has been delivered alive. Caroline struggles to manage her grief following Kate's funeral, and begins imagining conversations with her deceased spouse. Unwilling to give up her career to become a full-time single mother, she hires an ex-pupil Holly (Cara Theobold) to become Flora's nanny. Caroline is incredulous when, six weeks after Kate's death, John suggests they get back together. When Holly is revealed to be an alcoholic, Caroline turns to Flora's biological father, Greg, to help out with childcare.

== Reception ==
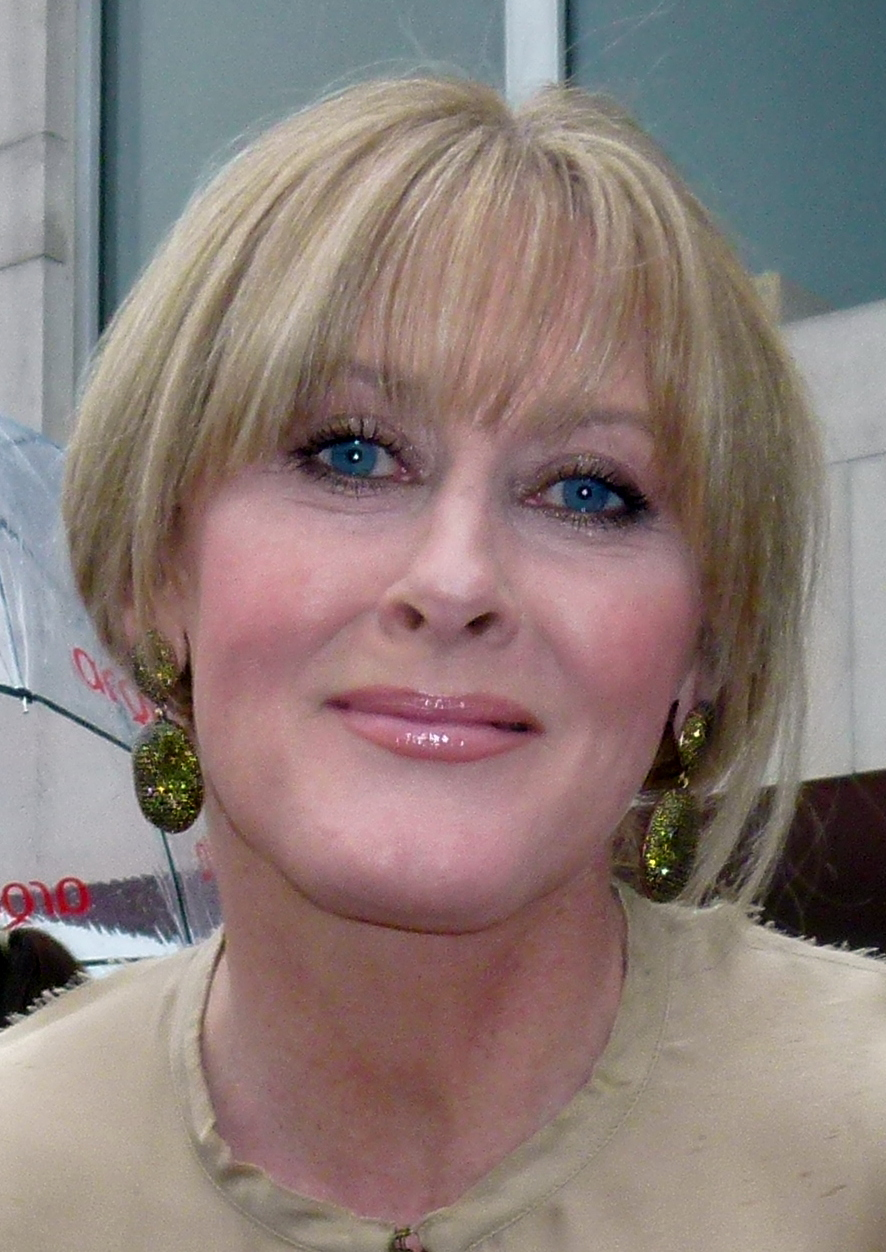
Sarah Lancashire pictured at the 2013 British Academy Television Awards, where she was nominated for Best Supporting Actress.

The role resulted in Lancashire receiving the most fan mail of her career, much of it from lesbian women who had similar experiences of coming out later in life. Lancashire was surprised and humbled by the responses from women stating that Caroline's same-sex relationship had personally inspired them. One of the letters she received was from a woman who had stated that the series had helped her come out to her own mother, after watching the whole series with her. Lancashire has received two nominations for the British Academy Television Award for Best Supporting Actress in both 2013 and 2014, winning in 2014. Reflecting on the award later in 2014, Lancashire stated that it came as "a lovely thing, to have your work recognised by your peers, but it was a big shock and wasn’t expected."

Critical reception to the character and her portrayal has also been very positive. Jill Guccini of After Ellen described the climax of the first series as a "dramatic, absolutely stunningly acted and fabulously written crescendo" and ranked Caroline as one of her "favorite lesbian characters ever". Reviewing the second episode of the third series, Neela Debnath of The Independent felt that Lancashire delivered the best performance in the series, in turn becoming the "real matriarch of the show". Alison Graham of the Radio Times praised the episode following Kate's death, stating that some of the scenes between Celia and Caroline "will take away pieces of your heart". Discussing the same episode, a reviewer for What's on TV stated that Lancashire gave "another masterclass in acting with a sublime, yet understated, performance throughout". However, Wainwright's narrative decision to make Caroline a widow drew criticism from some quarters; Kaite Welsh writing in The Guardian felt the writer had decided to "[privilege] a toxic biological relationship over a happy queer marriage".
