= Unforgiven (TV series) =

2009 three-part British television drama

- DVD cover
- Genre: Crime drama
- Written by: Sally Wainwright
- Directed by: David Evans
- Starring: Suranne Jones; Siobhan Finneran; Peter Davison; Douglas Hodge; Jemma Redgrave; Matthew McNulty; Emily Beecham; Jack Deam; Flora Spencer-Longhurst; Faye McKeever
- Composer: Malcolm Lindsay
- Country of origin: United Kingdom
- Original language: English
- No. of series: 1
- No. of episodes: 3

Production
- Executive producers: Hugo Heppell; Nicola Shindler; Sally Wainwright
- Producer: Karen Lewis
- Cinematography: Sean Bobbitt
- Editor: Mark Elliott
- Running time: 45 minutes
- Production company: Red Production Company

Original release
- Network: ITV
- Release: 12 January – 26 January 2009

Unforgiven is a three-part British television drama series, written by Sally Wainwright and directed by David Evans, that premiered on ITV (ITV1 and UTV) in January 2009. Set in Yorkshire, Unforgiven follows Ruth Slater (Suranne Jones), a woman found guilty of murdering two police officers when she was a teenager. Upon release from prison, Ruth is determined to find her sister, who was adopted shortly after the incident. Unforgiven won the award for Best Drama Series or Serial at the 2009 Royal Television Society Awards.

== Synopsis ==
Ruth Slater, a woman found guilty of murdering two police officers when she was a teenager, is released from prison. She is determined to find her sister, who was adopted shortly after the incident.

== Cast ==
- Suranne Jones as Ruth Slater
- Siobhan Finneran as Izzy Ingram
- Peter Davison as John Ingram
- Douglas Hodge as Michael Belcombe
- Jemma Redgrave as Rachel Belcombe
- Matthew McNulty as Steve Whelan
- Emily Beecham as Lucy Belcombe
- Jack Deam as Kieran Whelan
- Flora Spencer-Longhurst as Emily Belcombe
- Faye McKeever as Hannah Whelan
- George Costigan as Eddie Ackroyd
- Rebekah Staton as Tracey Broadbent
- Daryl Fishwick as Carol Crossland
- Freddie Jackson as Charlie Ingram
- Matt Hall as Rufus Ingram
- Will Mellor as Brad
- Bill Rodgers as Alan

== Episodes ==
No.	Title	Directed by	Written by	Original release date	Viewers (millions)
1	"Episode 1"	David Evans	Sally Wainwright	12 January 2009	7.82
Ruth is attempting to rebuild her life and to start the search for her sister, Katie, after serving 15 years of a life sentence for murdering two police officers when she was 17. She finds out from her probation officer that her sister was adopted and that her whereabouts and new name could not be disclosed for legal reasons. The Belcombes' adopted daughter, Lucy, gets herself into a serious car accident and is in a coma. Her sister, Emily, reveals that Lucy was unhappy and unable to cope with the pressures of university. John and Izzie Ingram move into their new house at Upper Hanging Stones Farm, which Izzie believes to be haunted. Kieran and Steve Whelan, whose father was one of the police officers Ruth shot, find out Ruth has been released and begin plotting revenge. When Ruth visits her old home, she meets John, who is a family lawyer, and he agrees to help Ruth find her sister. Ruth develops her first intimate relationship with a co-worker named Brad at the meat factory where she works.
2	"Episode 2"	David Evans	Sally Wainwright	19 January 2009	6.47
Steve has tracked down Ruth, but his plans to exact revenge are scuttled when Ruth's neighbour shows up at her door. He forms another plan for revenge after overhearing that Ruth has a sister. Ruth confesses to Brad about her past and the next day becomes the target of a hate campaign at work. John finds out for Ruth that her sister was adopted, living with Rachel and Michael Belcombe, and renamed Lucy. Meanwhile, Lucy wakes from her coma and begins to grapple with issues regarding her past. Michael and Rachel Belcombe find out that Ruth wants to re-establish contact with Lucy and are cold to the idea. Izzie finds out about Ruth's past, giving Ruth a frosty reception when she visits them again. Izzie is also livid to find out her youngest son was responsible for making her believe their house was haunted. With John's help, Ruth manages to meet the Belcombes but the meeting does not go well when she finds out the Belcombes never gave her letters to Katie/Lucy. Steve discovers his wife is having an affair with his brother. Emily stumbles upon Ruth's letters, and is moved by them. She sends Ruth an anonymous letter telling her where to find her sister.
3	"Episode 3"	David Evans	Sally Wainwright	26 January 2009	7.11
Ruth is haunted by flashbacks of her arrest as she goes to the University of York to seek out Lucy. Upon arriving there, she cannot summon the courage to speak to Lucy but rather only watches her from afar. Izzie, who has regretted her conduct towards Ruth, makes amends when Ruth visits the house. On the edge after discovering his wife's infidelity, Steve finds out Katie's new name and address from a private eye. But his plan for revenge starts to go wrong when he kidnaps Lucy's sister Emily instead. Ruth, back at York University, receives a call from Steve that he has kidnapped and is threatening to kill her sister; a baffled Ruth tells Steve that Lucy is at her location and Steve only realizes his mistake when Emily confirms her identity. With Izzie's help, Ruth summons the courage to tell an incredulous Lucy about the turn of events and to notify the Belcombes. During the drive to rescue Emily, Lucy's true relationship to Ruth begins to reveal itself and the two sisters are finally reunited.

== Production ==
Unforgiven was written by Sally Wainwright and directed by David Evans. Cinematography was by Sean Bobbitt. It was produced by the Red Production Company. It is set in Yorkshire, specifically the village of Boothtown in Halifax.

== Release ==
Unforgiven premiered on ITV (ITV1 and UTV) on 12 January 2009. Broadcast across three consecutive Mondays at 9:00 pm, the series averaged 7 million viewers across its run. The series was released on DVD on 2 February 2009. In 2012, it was broadcast on STV.

== Reception ==
=== Critical response ===
Writing in The Guardian, Gareth McLean praised Evans' direction and Jones' performance, saying "Measured and mesmerising, the script is taut and true, and Unforgiven has a bleak beauty about it." Brian Viner of The Independent also praised Jones' acting and gave the show five stars, writing: "There are moments when our credibility is, if not quite strained, then certainly challenged [...] but on the whole it is an engrossing, believable story, cleverly and thrillingly told."

=== Accolades ===
Unforgiven won the award for Best Drama Series or Serial at the 2009 RTS Awards, and writer Sally Wainwright won the Writer of the Year Award for her writing.

== Adaptation ==
A film adaptation of the series, named The Unforgivable, starring Sandra Bullock and directed by Nora Fingscheidt, was released in cinemas in the United States on 24 November 2021, prior to streaming on Netflix on 10 December 2024.
