= Moon and Me =

British children's video series

- Genre: Stop motion Children; Comedy
- Created by: Andrew Davenport
- Narrated by: Nina Sosanya
- Composer: Andrew Davenport
- Countries of origin: United Kingdom; United States
- Original language: English
- No. of episodes: 50

Production
- Producer: Andrew Davenport
- Running time: 22 minutes
- Production companies: Foundling Bird; Sutikki

Original release
- Network: CBeebies
- Release: 4 February 2019 – 17 January 2020

Moon and Me is a stop motion children's television series created by Andrew Davenport. The series airs in the UK on CBeebies while it airs in the United States on Universal Kids. The series was helped out by researcher Dylan Yamada-Rice by studying the ways that children interact with toy houses. The series was shot at Pinewood Atlanta Studios, in Fayetteville, Georgia.

Robert Lloyd of Los Angeles Times praised the series, comparing the series' pastoral nature to Thomas & Friends.

The series includes the following characters: Moon Baby, Pepi Nana, Little Nana, Mr. Onion, Sleepy Dibillo, Lambkin, Colly Wobble and Lily Plant.

All 50 episodes are narrated by Nina Sosanya who also provides the voices for all the characters, except for Jasmine Washington who portrays the Child. There are the rest of the puppet performers whose characters have not been identified including John Riddleberger, Emily Marsh, Dorothy James, Antony Antunes, and many more.
