= 2013 British Academy Television Awards =

UK television awards ceremony

- Date: 12 May 2013
- Site: Royal Festival Hall, London
- Hosted by: Graham Norton
- Produced by: Zoe Cook

Highlights
- Best Comedy Series: The Revolution Will Be Televised
- Best Drama: Last Tango in Halifax
- Best Actor: Ben Whishaw; Richard II
- Best Actress: Sheridan Smith; Mrs Biggs
- Best Comedy Performance: Steve Coogan Alan Partridge: Welcome to the Places of My Life; Olivia Colman Twenty Twelve
- Most awards: Olivia Colman/The Hollow Crown/Twenty Twelve (2)
- Most nominations: Accused/Last Tango in Halifax/London 2012/The Girl/Twenty Twelve (4)

Television coverage
- Channel: BBC One
- Duration: 2 hrs (TV Coverage)
- Ratings: 6.19 million

The 2013 British Academy Television Awards nominations were announced on 9 April 2013. The award ceremony was held at the Royal Festival Hall in London on 12 May 2013.

== Winners and Nominees ==
Winners are listed first and emboldened.

=== Leading Actor ===
- Ben Whishaw – Richard II: "The Hollow Crown" (BBC Two)
  - Sean Bean – Accused: "Tracie's Story" (BBC One)
  - Derek Jacobi – Last Tango in Halifax (BBC One)
  - Toby Jones – The Girl (BBC Two)

=== Leading Actress ===
- Sheridan Smith – Mrs Biggs (ITV)
  - Rebecca Hall – Parade's End (BBC Two)
  - Sienna Miller – The Girl (BBC Two)
  - Anne Reid – Last Tango in Halifax (BBC One)

=== Supporting Actor ===
- Simon Russell Beale – Henry IV, Parts I & II: "The Hollow Crown" (BBC Two)
  - Peter Capaldi – The Hour (BBC Two)
  - Stephen Graham – Accused: "Tracie's Story" (BBC One)
  - Harry Lloyd – The Fear (Channel 4)

=== Supporting Actress ===
- Olivia Colman – Accused: "Mo's Story" (BBC One)
  - Anastasia Hille – The Fear (Channel 4)
  - Sarah Lancashire – Last Tango in Halifax (BBC One)
  - Imelda Staunton – The Girl (BBC Two)

=== Entertainment Performance ===
- Alan Carr – Alan Carr: Chatty Man (Channel 4)
  - Ant & Dec – I'm a Celebrity...Get Me Out of Here! (ITV)
  - Sarah Millican – The Sarah Millican Television Programme (BBC Two)
  - Graham Norton – The Graham Norton Show (BBC One)

=== Female Performance In A Comedy Programme ===
- Olivia Colman – Twenty Twelve (BBC Two)
  - Julia Davis – Hunderby (Sky Atlantic)
  - Miranda Hart – Miranda (BBC One)
  - Jessica Hynes – Twenty Twelve (BBC Two)

=== Male Performance In A Comedy Programme ===
- Steve Coogan – Alan Partridge: Welcome to the Places of My Life (Sky Atlantic)
  - Hugh Bonneville – Twenty Twelve (BBC Two)
  - Peter Capaldi – The Thick of It (BBC Two)
  - Greg Davies – Cuckoo (BBC Three)

=== Single Drama ===
- Murder (BBC Two)
  - Everyday (Channel 4)
  - The Girl (BBC Two)
  - Richard II: "The Hollow Crown" (BBC Two)

=== Mini-Series ===
- Room at the Top (BBC Four)
  - Accused (BBC One)
  - Mrs Biggs (ITV)
  - Parade's End (BBC Two)

=== Drama Series ===
- Last Tango in Halifax (BBC One)
  - Ripper Street (BBC One)
  - Scott & Bailey (ITV)
  - Silk (BBC One)

=== Soap & Continuing Drama ===
- EastEnders (BBC One)
  - Coronation Street (ITV)
  - Emmerdale (ITV)
  - Shameless (Channel 4)

=== International ===
- Girls (HBO/Sky Atlantic)
  - The Bridge (SVT1/DR1/BBC Four)
  - Game of Thrones (HBO/Sky Atlantic)
  - Homeland (Showtime/Channel 4)

=== Factual Series ===
- Our War (BBC Three)
  - 24 Hours in A&E (Channel 4)
  - Great Ormond Street (BBC Two)
  - Make Bradford British (Channel 4)

=== Huw Wheldon Award for Specialist Factual ===
- All In The Best Possible Taste with Grayson Perry (Channel 4)
  - The Plane Crash (Channel 4)
  - The Plot to Bring Down Britain's Planes (Channel 4)
  - The Secret History of Our Streets (BBC Two)

=== Robert Flaherty Award for Single Documentary ===
- 7/7: One Day in London (BBC Two)
  - Baka: A Cry from the Rainforest (BBC Two)
  - Lucian Freud: Painted Life (BBC Two)
  - Nina Conti – A Ventriloquist's Story: Her Master's Voice (BBC Four)

=== Features ===
- The Great British Bake Off (BBC Two)
  - Bank of Dave (Channel 4)
  - Grand Designs (Channel 4)
  - Paul O'Grady: For the Love of Dogs (ITV)

=== Reality and Constructed Factual ===
- Made in Chelsea (E4)
  - The Audience (Channel 4)
  - I'm a Celebrity...Get Me Out of Here! (ITV)
  - The Young Apprentice (BBC One)

=== Current Affairs ===
- This World: "The Shame of the Catholic Church" (BBC Two)
  - Panorama: "Britain's Hidden Housing Crisis" (BBC One)
  - Exposure: "The Other Side of Jimmy Savile" (ITV)
  - Al Jazeera Investigates: "What Killed Arafat?" (Al Jazeera English)

=== News Coverage ===
- Granada Reports: "Hillsborough – The Truth at Last" (ITV)
  - BBC News at Ten: "Syria" (BBC One)
  - Channel 4 News: "Battle for Homs" (Channel 4)

=== Sport & Live Event ===
- The London 2012 Paralympic Games (Channel 4)
  - The London 2012 Olympics: "Super Saturday" (BBC One)
  - The London 2012 Olympic Opening Ceremony (BBC One)
  - Wimbledon 2012: "Men's Final" (BBC One)

=== Lew Grade Award for Entertainment Programme ===
- The Graham Norton Show (BBC One)
  - Dynamo: Magician Impossible (Watch)
  - Have I Got News for You (BBC One)
  - A League of Their Own (Sky1)

=== Comedy Programme ===
- The Revolution Will Be Televised (BBC Three)
  - Cardinal Burns (E4)
  - Mr Stink (BBC One)
  - Alan Partridge: Welcome to the Places of My Life (Sky Atlantic)

=== Situation Comedy ===
- Twenty Twelve (BBC Two)
  - Episodes (BBC Two)
  - Hunderby (Sky Atlantic)
  - The Thick of It (BBC Two)

=== Radio Times Audience Award ===
- Game of Thrones (HBO/Sky Atlantic)
  - Call the Midwife (BBC One)
  - The Great British Bake Off (BBC Two)
  - Homeland (Showtime/Channel 4)
  - The London 2012 Olympic Opening Ceremony (BBC One)
  - Strictly Come Dancing (BBC One)

=== Special Award ===
- Clare Balding

=== Fellowship ===
- Michael Palin

=== BAFTA Tribute ===
- Doctor Who

=== Wins per broadcaster ===
Broadcaster	Wins
BBC	15
Channel 4	4
Sky	3
ITV	2

== In Memoriam ==
- Patrick Moore
- Kenneth Kendall
- John Ammonds
- Peter Gilmore
- Clive Dunn
- Mary Tamm
- Larry Hagman
- Michael Hurll
- Simon Ward
- Bill Tarmey
- James Grout
- Robert Kee
- Richard Griffiths
- Alastair Burnet
- Geoffrey Hughes
- Jack Klugman
- Frank Thornton
- Mike Morris
- Nick Milligan
- Gerry Anderson
- Victor Spinetti
- Sid Waddell
- Max Bygraves
- Denis Forman
- Tony Gubba
- Eric Sykes
- Angharad Rees
- Alasdair Milne
- Richard Briers

== See also ==
- 2013 British Academy Television Craft Awards
- British Academy Television Awards
- BAFTA Scotland
- BAFTA Cymru
