= Last Tango in Halifax =

British drama television series

- Title card
- Genre: Romantic comedy Drama
- Created by: Sally Wainwright
- Written by: Sally Wainwright
- Starring: Derek Jacobi; Anne Reid; Sarah Lancashire; Nicola Walker
- Opening theme: "Last Tango in Halifax Theme"
- Composer: Murray Gold
- Country of origin: United Kingdom
- Original language: English
- No. of series: 5
- No. of episodes: 24 (list of episodes)

Production
- Executive producer: Nicola Shindler
- Production locations: Yorkshire, England
- Running time: 60 minutes
- Production company: Red Production Company

Original release
- Network: BBC One
- Release: 20 November 2012 – 15 March 2020

Last Tango in Halifax is a British romantic comedy drama series that began broadcasting on BBC One on 20 November 2012 until 15 March 2020. The series stars Derek Jacobi and Anne Reid as Alan and Celia, two widowed old aged pensioners (OAPs) who reconnect and fall in love after decades apart.

The series has been praised for its acting and dialogue, as well as its portrayal of the older generation. Jane Shilling of The Daily Telegraph summarised the series as "a triumph against TV's ageism", while Lucy Harmer, an executive of Age UK, endorsed the programme's portryal of Alan and Celia as "two real, rounded individuals". Last Tango in Halifax accrued four nominations for the 2013 British Academy Television Awards and won the British Academy Television Award for Best Drama Series.

== Synopsis ==
Set in Yorkshire, Celia Dawson and Alan Buttershaw are both widowed and in their 70s. They were attracted to each other in the 1950s, but never expressed their feelings, and Celia moved away with her parents. In the present day, they are reunited after being persuaded to join Facebook by their respective grandchildren. Alan has loved Celia since he was 16 years old, whilst Celia is described as a woman who is "unfulfilled" and was unhappily married to a man she grew to hate. After their reunion, Alan and Celia discover that they still feel as passionately for each other as they did when they were teenagers. Their story is described as a "testament of the uplifting power of love at any age".

Alan and Celia's romance is depicted alongside the troubles of their own grown-up daughters, and the series often portrays the extended family as both dark and comical in its themes. Alan's daughter, Gillian, and Celia's daughter, Caroline, are complete opposites: widowed Gillian runs a farm and works part time in a supermarket, whilst Oxford-educated Caroline is the head of an esteemed private school. Their parents' engagement affects both daughters' lives. Gillian wonders how she and her son will cope without her father around to help, whilst Caroline, struggling with depression, an ongoing divorce and her feelings for a female colleague, feels that her mother's unconventional romance gives her "permission to finally admit to being who she really is".

== Characters ==
=== Main cast ===
- Derek Jacobi as Alan Buttershaw
- Anne Reid as Celia Dawson
- Sarah Lancashire as Caroline McKenzie-Dawson
- Nicola Walker as Gillian Greenwood
- Tony Gardner as John Elliot
- Dean Andrews as Robbie
- Nina Sosanya as Kate McKenzie

=== Recurring cast ===
- Ronni Ancona as Judith Tyzack
- Louis Greatorex as Lawrence Elliot
- Edward Ashley (series 1–2) and Dean Smith (series 3–5) as William Elliot
- Josh Bolt as Raff Greenwood
- Katherine Rose Morley as Ellie
- Paul Copley as Harry
- Sacha Dhawan as Paul
- Marcus Garvey as Greg
- Rupert Graves as Gary

== Production ==
=== Concept and writing ===
The series is based on lead writer Sally Wainwright's personal experiences. She described it as "the most personal thing I've ever written". Her mother, Dorothy, lost contact with a childhood friend, Alec Walker, when she was 15, but they reconnected on the social networking website Friends Reunited 60 years later, and within six months were married. When she told the story to her colleague Nicola Shindler, Shindler suggested she turn her experience into a television series. Shindler became the series' executive producer.

Through Caroline, the series explores various LGBT themes. A source of contention for Celia is her daughter entering into a same sex relationship and later coming out to her. Anne Reid spoke positively of the storyline, stating that she believes a lot of people of her own generation are homophobic. She felt that her own character "might show them [and] might change them" just as Celia must become more accepting to avoid losing Alan. Jacobi concurred: Alan has "a streak of tolerance in him ... that perhaps Celia doesn't". In series three, the division between Celia and Caroline widens after Celia refuses to attend Caroline's wedding to her girlfriend. Wainwright felt that killing off Caroline's partner, Kate, would be the most effective way to propel the drama onwards and to develop the emotional lives of the remaining characters – however 'killing the lesbian' is a well-known homophobic film trope. She was conflicted over this decision, having grown attached to the character of Kate and actress Nina Sosanya, and wrote two versions of the fourth episode; the unaired one would have seen Kate survive.

=== Characters and casting ===
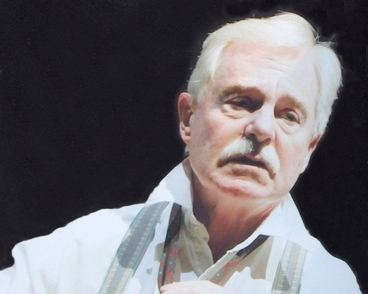
Derek Jacobi is renowned for his theatre work.

Discussing the casting of Derek Jacobi and Anne Reid, Wainwright stated: "we went for the best and we got them". The Guardian felt that one of the series' successes was the unlikely casting of a "theatrical knight" (Jacobi) and a "TV Stalwart" (Reid).

Jacobi was surprised to be offered the role of Alan; as his reputation centred on parts that were either "posh", "classical" or "costume". He enjoyed having the chance to play someone who is "an ordinary fellow". He also felt the series provided a chance to depict a "love story between two older characters that isn't patronising or stereotyped in any way". Jacobi also influenced the creative process—after Reid discovered Jacobi could jive, they implored Wainright to include a dance scene in an episode. Jacobi also inspired a scene in which two of Alan's friends (played by Roy Barraclough and Paul Copley) vie to be his best man. A teenage version of Alan is portrayed in flashback by Nico Mirallegro.

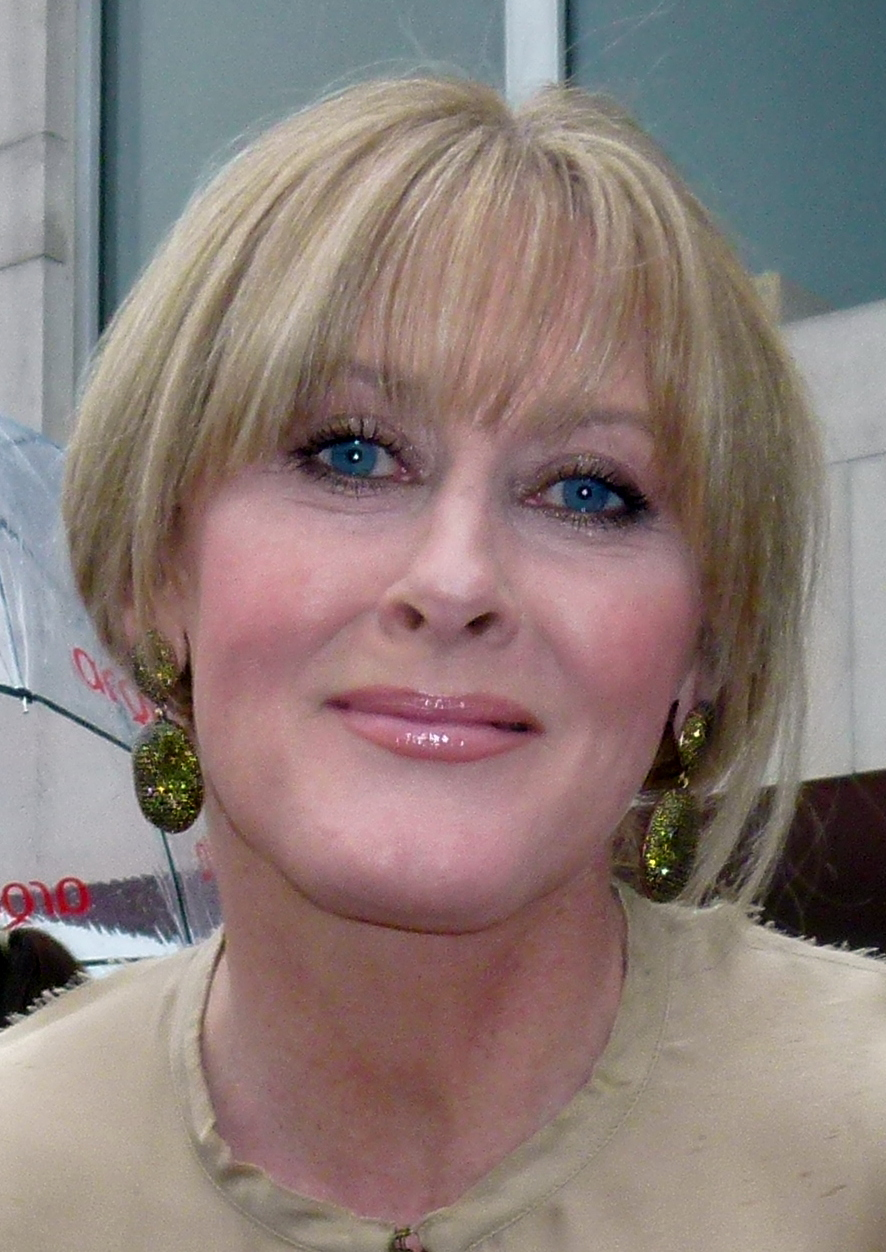
Sarah Lancashire portrays Celia's daughter Caroline, whose lesbian relationship forms a prominent subplot.

Reid was Wainwright's personal choice for the role of Celia. Reid hoped that Last Tango in Halifax would "give hope to older people". Reid identified herself with Celia's personality—believing herself to be quite reckless and outgoing—though stated that unlike her character she has no desire to enter another relationship. Reid described filming the series as "one of the best times in my career" and stated that she was proud of the work put in. Amelia Young plays a teenage Celia during a flashback sequence in episode six. Lancashire discerned that the series was "very special" within reading two pages of the script. Other factors that persuaded her to commit to the series included the casting of Reid and Jacobi, and the series' juxtaposition of a heart-warming story with elements of humour. In terms of her character, Lancashire identified with Caroline being "a working woman trying to keep everything under control". She stated the series' ensemble cast was "the closest I’ve come to being in a theatre company on television" due to how well the actors worked together.

The cast had all assumed that Last Tango in Halifax would run for only one series. Filming of the second series clashed with filming of the second series of the BBC One period drama The Paradise, which also starred Sarah Lancashire. This necessitated her having to leave her role in The Paradise halfway through the second series in order to reprise her role as Caroline in Last Tango in Halifax. In an interview in 2013 Lancashire stated that the decision to return to Last Tango in Halifax was the easiest she had made in her working life, stating "as an actor you can wait an entire career to be involved in a project like this."

The role resulted in her receiving the most fan mail of her career. Lancashire was surprised and humbled by the responses from women stating that Caroline's same-sex relationship had personally inspired them. She stated that in her approach to the character she did not focus on Caroline's sexuality but the "humanity of her". Due to the under-representation of gay characters on television, Lancashire felt it particularly important that Caroline's experience would not be portrayed inaccurately. In 2014 Wainwright recalled being "blown away" by Lancashire's performances in the rushes for the series, which partly inspired her to write the script for the series Happy Valley, in which Lancashire plays the lead role.

Nicola Walker completes the main cast as Gillian. She admired the character's honesty, bravery, and lack of self-pity and identified strongly with her tendency to speak before thinking things through and her deep love for her father. In 2014 The Daily Telegraph described the role as a "game-changer" in the trajectory of Walker's career. Though ultimately successful in winning the role, Walker initially believed that she would not get the part owing to a lack of confidence in her northern accent and the presence of northern actresses in the audition. Her approach to the character saw her delve into Gillian's psychology, with Walker particularly interested in the contradiction between Gillian's sexual confidence and her use of sex as a form of self-punishment. She felt the series showed a very adult approach to storytelling, stating that she had "never come across a character like Gillian before" and praising the variety of strong female roles.

The Independent noted the significance of the series having three female leads over the age of 40, stating that this, alongside Caroline's lesbian storyline and Gillian's attitude towards sex, made the series "quietly subversive" when compared with prime-time television as a whole.

In addition to its main characters, Last Tango in Halifax features a regular supporting cast. Nina Sosanya plays Caroline's romantic partner, Kate, whom she decides to marry over the course of the series. Gerard Gilbert of The Independent describes the relationship between the couple as "one of the most normalised lesbian relationships ever shown on the small screen." Nina Sosanya noted that she enjoyed filming with Sarah Lancashire and that the pair would "giggle a lot like completely juvenile idiots" whilst filming their love scenes.

Other characters introduced in the first series include Caroline's ex-husband, John (Tony Gardner), and his lover, Judith (Ronni Ancona), Gillian's brother-in-law, Robbie (Dean Andrews), and Paul (Sacha Dhawan), a young man with whom Gillian has a sexual relationship. Josh Bolt plays Gillian's son, Raff, whilst Edward Ashley and Louis Greatorex play Caroline's teenage sons, William and Lawrence. The second series expanded the families of Alan and Celia. Timothy West appears as Alan's brother, Ted, whilst Gemma Jones plays Celia's sister, Muriel. The third series later introduces Rupert Graves as Gary, who is revealed to be Alan's illegitimate son, and Michelle Hurst as Kate's mother, Ginika.

=== Filming ===
The first series was filmed in Yorkshire and in Altrincham between January and April 2012. Altrincham was used to represent scenes set in Harrogate, including those set at Caroline's house. The second series began filming in July 2013, with filming taking place at Holdsworth House in Halifax and Hoghton Tower, a fortified manor house in Lancashire, in August 2013. Students from the Department of Theatre, Film and Television at the University of York worked on the series as extras during September 2013. Filming for the third series began in Yorkshire and at Peover Hall near Knutsford, Cheshire, in July 2014. Filming for the fifth and final series was underway in October 2019.

In November 2017, explaining why the series had no starting date for filming its next series, a BBC spokesperson said "Sally [Wainwright] is presently engaged with another BBC project, but has every intention of revisiting Last Tango when she is able to." Wainwright's new period drama series, Gentleman Jack, was scheduled to air on BBC One in April 2019, and she was also working on a third series of Happy Valley.

== Episodes ==
=== Series overview ===
Series	Episodes	Originally released		Average UK viewers (millions)
Series	Episodes	First released	Last released	Average UK viewers (millions)
1	6	20 November 2012	19 December 2012	7.32
2	6	19 November 2013	24 December 2013	7.10
3	6	28 December 2014	1 February 2015	7.79
4	2	19 December 2016	20 December 2016	7.26
5	4	23 February 2020	15 March 2020	7.11

=== Series 1 (2012) ===
No. overall	No. in series	Title	Directed by	Written by	Original release date	U.K. viewers (millions)
1	1	"Episode 1"	Euros Lyn	Sally Wainwright	20 November 2012	7.30
Recently widowed Celia Dawson (Anne Reid) contacts Alan Buttershaw (Derek Jacobi)—a former romantic interest whom she has not seen for 60 years—on Facebook. Celia's daughter, Caroline (Sarah Lancashire), is surprised by the revelation, though distracted by her own romantic problems involving her adulterous husband, John (Tony Gardner), and her own relationship with a colleague, Kate (Nina Sosanya). Alan and Celia meet in Skipton and immediately rekindle their friendship. Celia's car is later damaged in pursuit of a young man who has stolen Alan's vehicle. Alan's daughter, Gillian (Nicola Walker), and Caroline clash on first encounter after rushing to collect their parents; both are shocked to discover that Alan and Celia plan to marry.
2	2	"Episode 2"	Euros Lyn	Sally Wainwright	27 November 2012	6.78
Caroline is worried her affair with Kate may become public knowledge as she considers taking back her adulterous husband, John. Widowed Gillian, meanwhile, continues a reckless sexual relationship with Paul (Sacha Dhawan), a man half her age. Alan and Celia enjoy the new lease on life they have discovered and decide to buy a new sports car as an engagement present to each other. As the families come together to celebrate Alan and Celia's engagement, Gillian's son, Raff (Josh Bolt), is arrested for assaulting Paul, whilst Caroline's son William (Edward Ashley) reveals that John is still in contact with his lover, Judith (Ronni Ancona). John is consequently abandoned at Gillian's farm as everybody else leaves.
3	3	"Episode 3"	Euros Lyn	Sally Wainwright	4 December 2012	7.51
A badly beaten Paul moves in with Gillian, whilst Raff moves in with his paternal uncle Robbie (Dean Andrews), who blames Gillian for her husband's death. Meanwhile John returns to Caroline's house and they furiously argue about his right to continue living there; their shouting is overheard by an amused Alan and Celia. Caroline confesses to Kate that she finds it difficult to express her emotions honestly. Alan and Celia begin looking at wedding venues. A Church of England vicar discourages them from having a church wedding since neither party has attended services for more than 30 years. Celia and Alan discuss politics and religion and the liberal Alan is surprised by Celia's conservative views. They visit a stately home in Southowram as a possible wedding venue but are locked inside overnight.
4	4	"Episode 4"	Sam Donovan	Sally Wainwright	11 December 2012	7.33
Alan and Celia spend a night in Southowram Hall. Gillian and Caroline are unable to make contact with their parents, neither of whom has a mobile phone signal. Gillian's worry prompts Raff and Robbie to visit and they become closer. Caroline spends the night at Gillian's whilst awaiting news of Alan and Celia and the two women bond over their fears and their respective problems with children and partners. Paul works out that Alan and Celia may have been visiting Southowram Hall and the police eventually find them. Caroline grows frustrated with John and admits to seeing an unnamed other.
5	5	"Episode 5"	Sam Donovan	Sally Wainwright	18 December 2012	7.49
Alan confides his darkest secret to Celia: that when Gillian's less-than-ideal husband Eddie attempted suicide, he did not die immediately, and she refrained from calling an ambulance; because he did not tell that to the police, Alan holds himself partly responsible for the man's death. Under the influence of alcohol, Gillian sleeps with the troubled John. Caroline meanwhile, prepares to go public about her relationship with Kate. Whilst William had suspected the relationship and is happy for her, Lawrence (Louis Greatorex), Caroline's younger son, is upset and confused. Caroline's birthday evening with Kate and her two sons is ruined by the arrival of an extremely drunk Judith, who ends up in accident and emergency. John discovers that Caroline is seeing Kate, and informs Celia.
6	6	"Episode 6"	Sam Donovan	Sally Wainwright	19 December 2012	7.48
Celia refuses to accept Caroline's relationship with Kate; her conservative views shock Alan, who implores her to give Kate a chance. Celia agrees to meet Kate at a dinner party hosted by Caroline. However, Celia's orthodox attitude towards Kate divides the evening guests, leading Alan to call off the wedding, and drives a wedge between Caroline and Kate. Caroline and Celia have a blazing row, trading insults and expletives. Celia realizes that her behavior had made her daughter unhappy and visits Kate, apologizing for her own behavior and imploring Kate to give Caroline another chance. Alan, meanwhile, suffers a heart attack. Celia realizes that she may have lost everything and rushes to his bedside. They reconcile and decide the wedding will go ahead. The first series ends with a flashback to 60 years ago, showing the teenage Alan (Nico Mirallegro) asking teenage Celia (Amelia Young) on a date, just as the present-day Alan regains consciousness. Prior to the closing credits, a dedication to Alec Walker (1929–2009), who inspired the character of Alan Buttershaw, is shown.

=== Series 2 (2013) ===
No. overall	No. in series	Title	Directed by	Written by	Original release date	U.K. viewers (millions)
7	1	"Episode 1"	Euros Lyn	Sally Wainwright	19 November 2013	7.42
Alan recuperates in hospital from his heart attack. Meanwhile, Gillian is contacted by John, who claims to have fallen in love with her. Unsettled, Gillian confesses to Caroline that she had a one night stand with John. Alan and Celia decide to get married as quickly as possible, with minimum fuss, and book an appointment at the register office. After finding out about Gillian's sexual encounter with John, Alan tells her that both he and his late wife were ashamed of her promiscuity, mentioning an abortion she had at age fifteen. At the end of the episode Gillian discovers Alan and Celia's appointment card for the register office on the morning of their wedding.
8	2	"Episode 2"	Euros Lyn	Sally Wainwright	26 November 2013	7.60
Alan and Celia get married, persuading two passersby to act as witnesses. Gillian turns up at the register office and expresses her feelings of hurt and rejection at not being invited to the ceremony. She is convinced that Alan and Celia think less of her than Caroline's family because of their differing social class. Caroline seeks to secure funds to buy John out of their house. To achieve this, she needs financial support from both Celia and Kate, and asks Kate to move in with her. Kate tells Caroline that, because she is nearing her 42nd birthday, she wants a baby of her own before it is too late. Gillian discovers that Raff's girlfriend Ellie (Katherine Rose Morley) is eight months pregnant. Alan and Celia arrive to provide support, and after Ellie goes into labour, Alan welcomes a great-granddaughter.
9	3	"Episode 3"	Euros Lyn	Sally Wainwright	3 December 2013	5.96
Maurice (Roy Barraclough) is hurt by Alan having married quietly without inviting his friends. Later, Celia relays to Robbie that Gillian had an abortion at the age of 15; he realises it was his fetus she aborted, causing fractures in their relationship. Meanwhile, Kate tells Caroline she has chosen her friend, Greg, as a sperm donor, while Alan and Celia plan to buy a bungalow. With Robbie absent, and Raff and Ellie neglecting the baby, Gillian is left to look after her granddaughter. John arrives to support her, and she tells him of her doubts about Robbie's suitability for her, given the fact she did not take the necessary action to prevent Eddie's death. Alan tells Celia that Gillian had actually killed Eddie with a block of wood following Eddie's apparent suicide attempt.
10	4	"Episode 4"	Jill Robertson	Sally Wainwright	10 December 2013	7.15
Alan muses about whether or not the coroner's verdict of suicide regarding Eddie was correct. On what was supposed to be a romantic birthday weekend getaway, Kate is angered by Caroline's continuing reluctance to publicly acknowledge her and Kate's relationship. Kate and Greg reminisce about their university days, excluding Caroline, and Caroline reacts badly. Kate tells her the next morning that she believes Caroline is too old to change, and their relationship is over, having never properly started. Judith arrives at Gillian's house and accuses John of plagiarism, as his novel was inspired by her idea to write a novel based on Celia and Alan's romance. John's infatuation and one night stand with Gillian is revealed in front of Robbie, inciting Robbie to punch John and walk out again. At Caroline's house, Celia and Alan deal with a drunken Lawrence and a shaken William, who has been assaulted at a cashpoint. Alan is devastated by the news of Maurice's sudden death. At the wake, he and Celia decide to marry a second time so that this time they can share the day with family and friends.
11	5	"Episode 5"	Jill Robertson	Sally Wainwright	17 December 2013	7.06
Three months after the previous episode, William leaves for university, and Lawrence tells his mother he wants to live with his dad, who is now co-habitating with a pregnant Judith. Gillian is jealous of Robbie's new partner, Cheryl (Rachel Leskovac). Kate reveals she is twelve weeks pregnant; though Caroline is restrained in her presence, she is later overcome with emotion. Gillian volunteers her and Caroline's services to plan Alan and Celia's second wedding. Alan and Celia visit Celia's estranged sister, Muriel (Gemma Jones), whom Celia fell out with when Muriel married a man whom Celia had been attracted to. After a day out together researching the wedding, a drunken Gillian tells Caroline she deliberately killed her husband and staged his suicide, as she could take no more of his abuse and feared he'd one day kill her.
12	6	"Episode 6"	Jill Robertson	Sally Wainwright	24 December 2013	7.40
Caroline promises Gillian she will keep her secret. Caroline implores Kate to give her another chance and let her learn from her mistakes. When Kate is rushed to hospital, Caroline drops everything to check that Kate and her unborn baby are safe and well. Alan visits his first wife's grave and talks about Celia, seeking her blessing. In the days before the wedding, Alan's brother, Ted (Timothy West), makes a surprise appearance from New Zealand. At Alan's stag party, Alan and Raff encourage Robbie to pursue Gillian, as they believe they are right for each other. Meanwhile, Celia tells Muriel of her own unhappy first marriage. The wedding takes place on Christmas Eve, with Kate playing the piano at Celia's request, and Caroline taking on the traditional duties of the bride's father. At the wedding dance, Gillian flirts with Robbie and Kate asks Caroline to dance, with the two women promising to commit to each other. The episode ends with Alan and Celia, and Kate and Caroline happy together, whilst Gillian cuts in on Robbie and Cheryl on the dance floor.

=== Series 3 (2014–2015) ===
No. overall	No. in series	Title	Directed by	Written by	Original release date	U.K. viewers (millions)
13	1	"Episode 1"	Nigel Cole	Sally Wainwright	28 December 2014	7.89
On Valentine's Day, Alan and Celia enjoy a romantic dinner, whilst Caroline proposes to a now heavily pregnant Kate, and Gillian goes on a date with a man named Gary (Rupert Graves). Gary tells Gillian that he is Alan's son, the product of a brief affair Alan had in the 1960s. Both Caroline and Alan are afraid of how Celia might take the news, given the unhappiness caused by her first husband's adultery. The news of Caroline and Kate's upcoming wedding brings out Celia's latent prejudices, and Lawrence is subjected to an incident of homophobic bullying at school. John seeks solace from Caroline and his family in the wake of Judith's miscarriage, whilst Gillian sleeps with Robbie despite his ongoing relationship with Cheryl. At the end of the episode, Gillian takes Celia shopping for a wedding outfit so that Alan can go to meet Gary without Celia knowing.
14	2	"Episode 2"	Nigel Cole	Sally Wainwright	4 January 2015	7.47
Alan meets Gary and the two get along very well. Meanwhile, as Judith has moved away to St Albans, John moves into Caroline's spare room, making Kate feel uncomfortable. Gillian loses her job at the supermarket after Cheryl publicly humiliates her. Celia is devastated after Alan reveals his secret child, infuriated by his dishonesty and unsure of how to progress in their marriage. She refuses to meet Gary after he invites all of Alan's family to dinner, and moves back to Harrogate to have some space and be close to Caroline. Alan, Raff, and Gillian are impressed by Gary's success after learning how as a young entrepreneur he eventually built a multi-million-pound business. Despite Caroline's efforts to counter her mother's despondency, Celia rejects both Alan and Caroline, refusing to attend her daughter's wedding. Caroline warns her mother that this may irrevocably damage their relationship. When Alan turns up alone at the register office prior to the wedding, Caroline lashes out at him, telling him his presence is not welcome without Celia—something she had also said (almost word-for-word) to her own father when he showed up at her doctoral graduation and Celia didn't.
15	3	"Episode 3"	Nigel Cole	Sally Wainwright	11 January 2015	7.43
Caroline and Kate exchange vows and rings in the company of friends, colleagues and Caroline's elder son, William (now Dean Smith). Robbie tells Gillian he wants to marry her and wishes to support her financially. After John drives Alan back to the farm, he gets drunk with Gillian, and they sleep together again. Following the departure of the wedding guests, Celia visits Caroline and enquires about her day. Caroline is angered and hurt by her mother's behaviour and uninterested in Celia's marital problems. The next day, Gillian tells John he is a bad influence on her, and she cannot be with him, opting instead to accept Robbie's proposal. Celia attempts to repair her relationship with Alan by meeting Gary and spending the afternoon with Alan's extended family. Caroline is distraught when Kate is critically injured in a car accident. Alan and Celia rush to support and console her, and Caroline makes amends with Alan following her words to him at the wedding. They learn the baby has been delivered safely; Caroline breaks down in tears after hearing further information from the surgeon.
16	4	"Episode 4"	Syd Macartney	Sally Wainwright	18 January 2015	7.84
On the morning of Kate's funeral, Caroline decides to name their baby Flora Grace. At the wake, Caroline bonds with Kate's mother (Michelle Hurst), but is perturbed when Greg offers to provide paternal support to her and Kate's child. Meanwhile, Celia is furious when she catches Alan sneaking a cigarette, in spite of his heart condition. Caroline, struggling with her bereavement, leans on Celia for emotional support. Raff is delighted that Gillian and Robbie are getting married, though Gillian is anxious for Caroline to keep her secret. Gary becomes increasingly paranoid when neither Gillian nor Alan is willing to get in touch. Unwilling to give up her career or place too much of a burden on her elderly parents, Caroline hires ex-pupil Holly (Cara Theobold) to be Flora's nanny.
17	5	"Episode 5"	Syd Macartney	Sally Wainwright	25 January 2015	7.94
Lawrence's behaviour at school becomes disruptive, leading Caroline to suspend him. Alan starts to distance himself from Gary when Gary's behaviour becomes increasingly needy and obsessive. Gary offers to pay for Gillian's wedding and to put Raff through an accountancy apprenticeship in his business, though she is unhappy with both suggestions. Meanwhile, Caroline is incredulous when John suggests they give their relationship another go. When Holly is revealed to be an alcoholic, Caroline invites Greg, Flora’s biological father and a successful comic book artist, to become Flora's live-in sitter. Greg bonds with Flora, impresses both Caroline and Celia, and manages to win round Lawrence to his half-sister. Gillian discovers that Gary has divulged the secret of his true parentage to the press, which greatly embarrasses Alan.
18	6	"Episode 6"	Syd Macartney	Sally Wainwright	1 February 2015	8.16
Caroline prepares to drive Gillian to the wedding, but her step-sister has cold feet. Flashbacks reveal that she accepted Gary's offer of a lavish wedding out of guilt at Alan's having rejected him and because she cheated on her fiancé—twice once with a colleague (Jaz Martin) after Robbie insulted her, and again with John. She has also learnt that Robbie knew that his brother had abused her and did not intervene. After a series of delays, Caroline, Gillian, and Alan arrive at the venue. With encouragement from Caroline, Gillian marries Robbie, not wishing to cause a scene or stand him up. Later, Celia helps Alan and Gary make peace, Gary having apologised for his behaviour. Caroline reflects on the tragedy of her own short-lived marriage, realising just how much she loves Flora and that she cannot keep holding on to the image of Kate's "ghost". As she prepares to visit Kate's mother in New York, Gary upgrades Alan and Celia's tickets for their belated honeymoon to New Zealand and Australia, whilst Gillian and Robbie are to have use of his apartment in Mallorca for their own honeymoon.

=== Series 4 (2016) ===
Series Four consists of two episodes featured as Christmas Specials.

No. overall	No. in series	Title	Directed by	Written by	Original release date	U.K. viewers (millions)
19	1	"Episode 1"	Juliet May	Sally Wainwright	19 December 2016	7.30
Gillian believes she's being haunted by Eddie. A new headship for Caroline means the family must move. Their new home in Huddersfield is a ramshackle farmhouse. When Alan tries to discuss his burial wishes with Gillian, things become problematic.
20	2	"Episode 2"	Juliet May	Sally Wainwright	20 December 2016	7.21
As she continues to be haunted by Eddie's death, Gillian makes a major decision about her life. Caroline finally reveals to Gillian the truth about her acceptance of her new position. Alan must face his fears on the night of Celia's play.

=== Series 5 (2020) ===
No. overall	No. in series	Title	Directed by	Written by	Original release date	U.K. viewers (millions)
21	1	"Episode 1"	Gareth Bryn	Sally Wainwright	23 February 2020	7.63
Alan and Celia, seven years into their marriage, have recently moved into a desirable bungalow with stunning views across the Calder Valley, yet they aren’t seeing eye to eye. Celia is baffled when Alan applies for a job in a local supermarket, and Alan can’t understand why they need an expensive new kitchen. Alan’s brother, Ted, has booked a last-minute trip from New Zealand, which means more spending to kit out the spare bedroom, and Gillian, already stretched with bank repayments, discovers she has woodworm nibbling at her roof timbers. Having transformed her difficult new school with phenomenal success, a guest appearance by megastar author and John's girlfriend Judith Tyzack threatens to bring a fresh challenge to Caroline’s headship. A phone call from New Zealand gives Alan and Celia pause for thought, and tempers are frayed at Caroline and Gillian’s joint birthday celebration when money becomes the topic of conversation. Meanwhile, Judith presents John with an awkward proposition.
22	2	"Episode 2"	Gareth Bryn	Sally Wainwright	1 March 2020	6.57
Celia is quick to apologise for causing a scene, but with Alan seeking excitement outside the bungalow and Celia seeking it within, their relationship comes under increasing strain. Questions are raised when Ted arrives from overseas with a lifetime's worth of luggage and two young New Zealanders, Mia and Alyssa, in tow. Raff is left speechless when a mural of a giraffe appears unexpectedly on the wall of the barn at Far Slack farm, and Gillian is riddled with old anxieties when it brings unwarranted attention to the barn. Meanwhile, Caroline and Ruth get on like a house on fire until Caroline lets her guard down and receives an unexpected response. As Judith looks to the future, John begins to look the other way. Ted’s return stirs up the past for Alan: when he learns that Ted has bought a one-way ticket, Alan begins to suspect that he isn’t telling the full story.
23	3	"Episode 3"	Gareth Bryn	Sally Wainwright	8 March 2020	7.10
There’s chaos at the bungalow as work begins to strip out the old kitchen. Alan’s new supermarket job brings an unexpected challenge in the form of Harrison, and an overburdened Celia is called upon to travel by bus. Caroline has cause to question how people see her, and the giraffe continues to torment Gillian, who is pushed to her wits’ end by the return of PC Cheryl. Elsewhere, a hungover Judith has an epiphany, Caroline gains an unwanted lodger, and the truth about Ted’s last-minute trip comes to light.
24	4	"Episode 4"	Gareth Bryn	Sally Wainwright	15 March 2020	7.15
Gillian is pushed to breaking point at the farm, and Caroline finds herself at the heart of an unlikely love triangle. Ellie airs PC Cheryl's suspicions about Eddie, and a guilt-ridden Raff confides a difficult secret to Alan. Ted makes a sentimental journey to the seaside at Bridlington, where he and his beloved wife had their honeymoon, while Alan and Celia find reason to laugh together again. However, sobering news awaits.

== Broadcast audiences ==
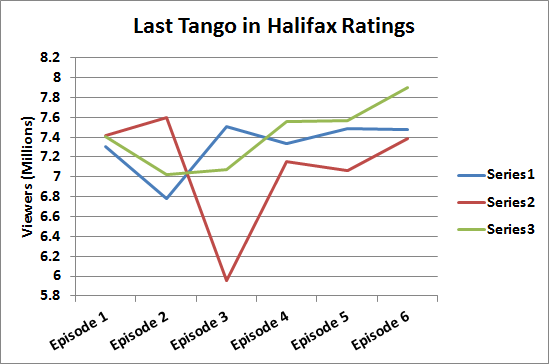
Consolidated viewing figures

The series premièred to overnight ratings of 6.160 million viewers, 25.6% of the available audience, as the highest rated show at 9 pm on 20 November. The first series' finale, airing 19 December 2012, also won its time-slot, achieving an overnight series high of 6.290 million viewers, 26.6% of the available audience. Consolidated figures released by the Broadcasters' Audience Research Board (BARB) revealed that the series première achieved a consolidated rating of 7.304 million viewers, whilst the finale had 7.480 million. The overall series average in terms of viewing figures was 7.316 million viewers. (Note: Calculated by combining the individual viewing figures for each episode, sourced from the Broadcasters' Audience Research Board (7.304 million, 6.779 million, 7.508 million, 7.334 million, 7.492 million, 7.480 million) and dividing by six.) The Independent reported that the early consolidated ratings received by the programme made it the highest rated new mid-week television drama of 2012. In September 2013, the series began airing on the American broadcast television network PBS.

== Critical reception ==
On Rotten Tomatoes, Series 1 holds a score of 94% based on 17 reviews; the consensus reads: "Charming and sweet, Last Tango in Halifax is a moving comedy-drama that delights as it touches hearts of all ages, boasting marvellous performances by its leading actors." Series 2 holds a score of 100% based on reviews from 6 critics. Series 3 holds a score of 100% based on reviews from 7 critics. Series 5 holds a score of 86% based on reviews from 7 critics.

The series has attracted mostly positive reviews, largely focused on the depiction of its two septuagenarian lead characters. Jane Shilling of The Daily Telegraph labelled the series "a triumph against TV's ageism" in an examination of the portrayal of elderly people in the media. Shilling singled out Jacobi and Reid's performances, stating that they provide a "mixture of gravity and levity" that "brings a transcendent quality to their characters' resolute ordinariness".

Lucy Harmer, an executive member of the charity Age UK, also praised the series for portraying two "normal, healthy and sane" older characters, citing the depiction of Internet use by the elderly as something ordinary. She compared the treatment of older characters in the series to Hilary Boyd's novel Thursdays in the Park and the film The Best Exotic Marigold Hotel (2012).

The Huffington Post's Caroline Frost thought the series was reminiscent of the dialogue and sensibility of the playwright Alan Bennett. She wrote the story was poignant and praised a central theme underlining "how many people make do with their day-to-day business and responsibilities, while still holding on to their private dreams".

Andrew Anthony of The Guardian had his "low expectations ... squarely confounded", giving particular praise to the dialogue and the central performances. Jane Simon of the Daily Mirror felt that Last Tango in Halifax experienced a mid-series dip, though she praised what she felt was a triumphant finale. She also praised Wainwright's script and the lead quartet of Jacobi, Reid, Lancashire, and Walker for creating "characters you can believe in even when they're behaving appallingly".

The series was reviewed favourably by the American website AfterEllen, which reports on the depiction of gay and bisexual women in the media. Correspondent Jill Guccini stated that she "started off watching this series thinking it was a cute little show about some oldies falling in love", but at the end of the series believed it was "some of the finest television I've seen, anywhere, ever".

Critical reception in the United States was also largely positive following PBS' acquisition of the show. Mary McNamara of the Los Angeles Times labelled the series as "the best new show of the fall", describing it as "a rapturous mix of absurdly fairy-tale-romance and frantic modern complications, set in the picturesque drear of Yorkshire and brought to life by masterfully shaded performances." She opined that Reid and Jacobi "are capable of doing more with a startled look or careful smile ... than most actors can do in seven pages of dialogue".

Matthew Gilbert of The Boston Globe acknowledged that the US public might not find the series appealing based on its title and premise alone, stating that PBS' description of the programme made it sound "as saccharine and hackneyed as a Geritol commercial". Upon viewing the series, however, he praised the added dimensions of the series and wrote that it was "so much more interesting" than the central premise suggested. He also felt that Walker and Lancashire played an important part, "both add[ing] a necessary amount of bitter to the sweet".

Mike Hale of The New York Times was more cynical about the series, describing it as a "warm comforter of a series" and "treacle". However, he felt that series also distinguished itself from this category of media by its "relatively dry style and careful modulation of tone and volume" in addition to "a crackerjack cast".

=== Accolades ===
The first series of Last Tango in Halifax was nominated for four awards at the 2013 British Academy Television Awards, which took place on 12 May 2013. Actors Derek Jacobi, Anne Reid, and Sarah Lancashire earned respective nominations in the Best Actor, Best Actress, and Best Supporting Actress categories. The series itself was nominated for the British Academy Television Award for Best Drama Series, and ultimately won. Additionally, Wainwright was named best Drama Writer at the 2013 British Academy Television Craft Awards for her writing of the series. The series was nominated for Best Drama Series at the 2013 Broadcasting Press Guild Awards whilst Sally Wainwright was nominated for the writer's award for her contribution to both Last Tango in Halifax and Scott & Bailey. In 2014, Sarah Lancashire and Nicola Walker were both nominated for a British Academy Television Award in the category for "Best Supporting Actress" for their roles in Last Tango in Halifax. Lancashire won the award for her role as Caroline.

== Future ==
In October 2013, it was reported in news outlets that American actress, screenwriter and producer Diane Keaton had acquired the rights to remake Last Tango in Halifax for American audiences on the subscription cable channel HBO. Sally Wainwright mentioned this development at a Broadcasting Press Guild event and stated that, though she did not expect to be closely involved in the remake, she would have an associate producer role. However, the following day Red Production Company released a statement stating that a remake would probably be delayed since the original series was still airing on American channel PBS. In April 2014, it was reported that the series would be remade for French television by BBC Worldwide France and the production company NEWEN.
