= Roald & Beatrix: The Tail of the Curious Mouse =

British drama

- Genre: Drama
- Written by: Abigail Wilson
- Directed by: David Kerr
- Starring: Dawn French; Jessica Hynes; Alison Steadman; Rob Brydon; Nina Sosanya; Bill Bailey; Nick Mohammed
- Narrated by: John Hannah
- Country of origin: United Kingdom
- Original language: English

Production
- Executive producers: Dan Cheesbrough; Jon Montague
- Producer: Elaine Cameron
- Cinematography: John Conroy
- Running time: 89 minutes
- Production company: Hartswood Films

Original release
- Network: Sky One
- Release: 24 December 2020

Roald & Beatrix: The Tail of the Curious Mouse is a Sky original made-for-television drama film inspired by the true story of a six-year-old Roald Dahl meeting his idol Beatrix Potter. It was written by Abigail Wilson and directed by David Kerr and stars Dawn French as Potter, Rob Brydon as William Heelis and Jessica Hynes as Sofie Dahl.

== Storyline ==
Set in 1922, Roald & Beatrix: The Tail of the Curious Mouse is a comedy drama inspired by the true story which follows six-year-old Roald Dahl (Harry Tayler) as he sets off on an adventure to meet his favourite author, Beatrix Potter (Dawn French).

The famed author is coming to the end of her career. With her publisher hounding her for her next draft, she is unable to concentrate and has had enough of writing children's books. It is not just her motivation that she has lost—her optometrist has recognised she has failing eyesight. With Christmas approaching, Beatrix is pressured, feeling increasingly out of touch with her readers, not to mention the trespassing fans and jovial door-knocking carol singers.

Her Cumbrian farm and ever-growing Herdwick sheep flock, her husband William and disobedient animals including a pig called Sally, act as her only real comfort as she looks for inspiration and resists taking the easy way out with her publisher.

More than 300 kilometres away in Wales, life is changing for an anxious young boy called Roald. Having recently lost his older sister and now his father, the once happy six-year-old has found solace and comfort in books. The beloved tales of Peter Rabbit and Jemima Puddle-Duck fill his mind, distracting him from the funeral, sadness and the revelation that he might be sent to boarding school.

Wanting to run away, he is encouraged by his mother Sofie (Jessica Hynes) to follow his dreams and visit his hero Beatrix Potter. Roald pushes his anxiety aside and they set off on his first big adventure. Their extraordinary journey is filled with unpredictable and humorous characters all of whom ignite Roald's imagination and provide comfort to his grieving mother.

The dream of meeting his favourite author is realised and their special encounter proves to be a magical and life changing moment for both.

== Cast ==
- Dawn French as Beatrix Potter
- Rob Brydon as William Heelis
- Jessica Hynes as Sofie Dahl
- Harry Tayler as Roald Dahl
- Alison Steadman as Dora
- Bill Bailey as Bona Fide Gent
- Nina Sosanya as Anne Landy
- Nick Mohammed as Mr Entwhistle
- John Hannah as Narrator

== Production ==
=== Filming ===
Roald & Beatrix: The Tail of the Curious Mouse was filmed in Wales.

=== Title sequence ===
The title sequence is animated to look like layers of cut out paper. It was made by Peter Anderson Studio. The sequence won an RTS award in the category 'Design – Titles' in 2021, with the jury noting "these titles were, enchanting, playful and nicely put together. They were charming and original and were everything a title sequence should be". The sequence was also nominated for a BAFTA award at the British Academy Television Craft Awards in the category 'Television Craft | Titles & Graphic Identity' in 2021.

== Critical reception ==
Reviewing the book for the Financial Times, Suzy Feay wrote "a Christmas classic is born". Anita Singh at The Telegraph gave it three stars and called it "A sweet tale of a very unlikely meeting". The Spectator said it was "essential national viewing". while The Independent also gave it three stars with Adam White mentioning "This only-slightly-true Sky One film is gentle fun for all the family." Lauren Morris at The Radio Times gave it four stars, describing it as a "heart-warming Christmas tonic for fans of all ages."
