= Michelle Hurst =

American actress (born 1942)

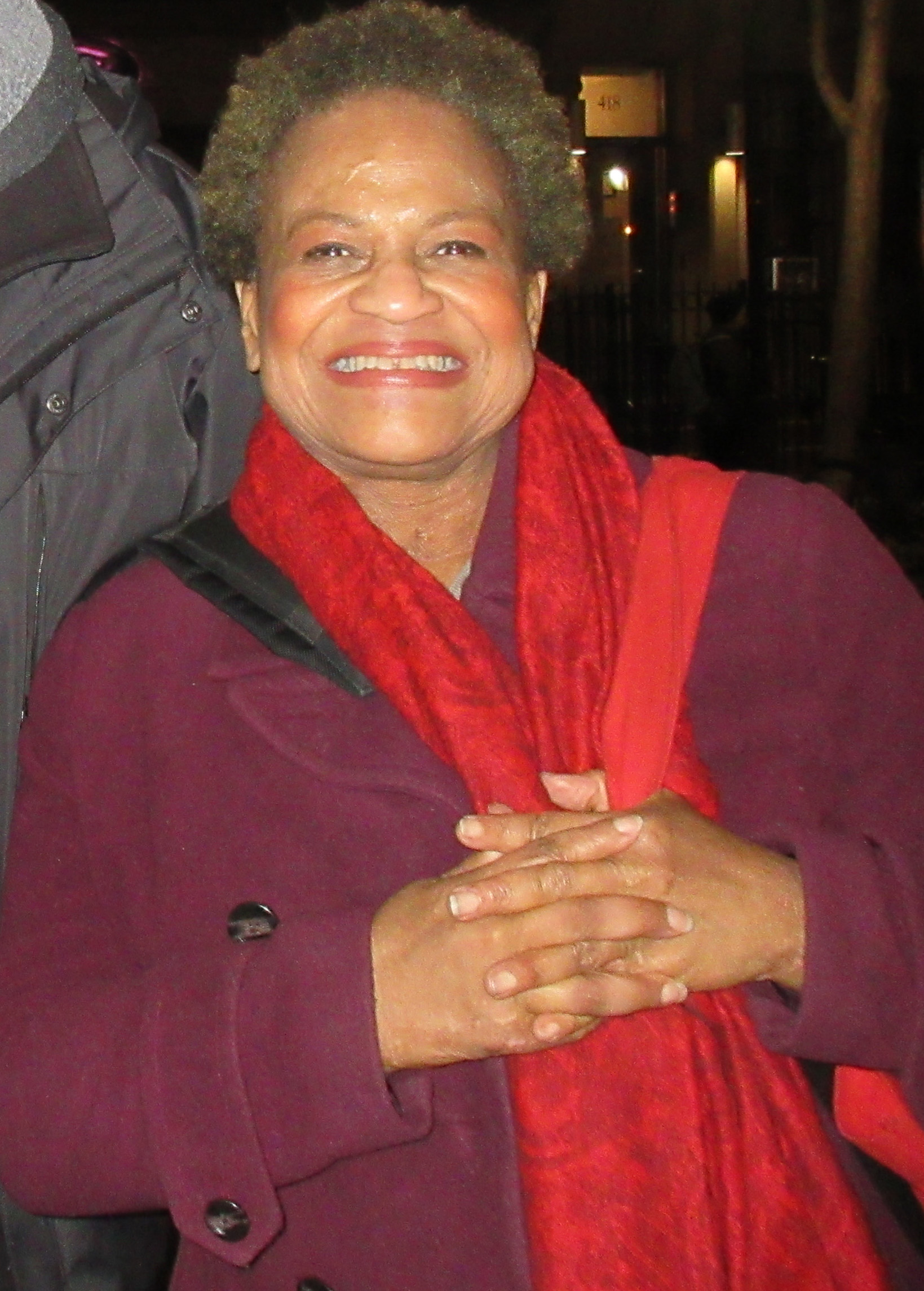
- (2018)
- Born: Michelle Denise Hurst; June 1, 1942 (age 84); Brooklyn, New York, U.S.
- Education: Midwood High School; Mount Holyoke College
- Occupation: Actress
- Years active: [[]]

Michelle Denise Hurst (born June 1, 1942) is an American actress. She played Miss Claudette Pelage in the first season of the streaming television series Orange Is the New Black.

== Life and career ==
Born in Brooklyn on June 1, 1942, Hurst grew up in Bedford Stuyvesant and Crown Heights and attended Midwood High School. She graduated from Mount Holyoke College in 1974.

Hurst began her career in theatre, and in the 1990s began appearing in television and film. Hurst is known for her multiple roles in various Law & Order television shows. She co-starred in films like Airheads, Smoke, Stepmom and Sherrybaby.

Hurst starred as Miss Claudette Pelage in the first season of the Netflix comedy-drama series, Orange Is the New Black in 2013. This role earned Hurst, along with the main cast, a Satellite Award for Best Cast – Television Series. Hurst did not return to the show after the first season after she was seriously injured in a car accident in December 2013. Hurst was placed in a 16-day coma so doctors could perform surgeries close to her spine.

== Filmography ==
=== Film ===
Year	Title	Role	Notes
1989	Born on the Fourth of July	Reporter #2	
1993	The Night We Never Met	Leslie	
1994	Airheads	Yvonne	
1995	Smoke	Aunt Em	
1995	Blue in the Face	Statistician	
1996	I Shot Andy Warhol	Nedicks Manager	
1997	Office Killer	Kate	
1998	Stepmom	Nurse	
2001	Just Visiting	Pawnshop Broker	
2003	In the Cut	Teacher	
2004	Poster Boy	Professor Silver	
2006	Sherrybaby	Dorothy Washington	
2008	Choke	Shapely Nurse	
2010	A Little Help	Eileen	
2010	All Good Things	Newscaster	
2011	I Don't Know How She Does It	Nurse	
2012	Frances Ha	Theater Manager	
2014	Hard Sell	Nurse Parker	
2017	Permission	Dr. Bennett	

=== Television ===
Year	Title	Role	Notes
1995	New York Undercover	Ms. Ellis	Episode: "Brotherhood"
1995	New York News	ER Nurse	Episode: "Welcome Back Cotter"
1996-2001	Law & Order	Various	4 Episodes"
2000-2015	Law & Order: Special Victims Unit	Various	4 Episodes"
2000	Cosby	Ms. Summers	Episode: "Thursday's Child"
2000	Sex and the City	Nurse	Episode: "Running with Scissors"
2002	Law & Order: Criminal Intent	Audrey	Episode: "The Pilgrim"
2003	Life on the Line	Dr. Morgan	Television movie
2004	Rescue Me	Case Worker	Episode: "Revenge"
2004	Third Watch	Judge Connie Allen	Episode: "Leap of Faith"
2009	The Good Wife	Judge Hester James	Episode: "Home"
2010	Blue Bloods	Councilwoman Collins	Episode: "Re-Do"
2012	NYC 22	Deputy Chief Rosalind Adamczyk	Episode: "Samaritans"
2013	Orange Is the New Black	Miss Claudette Pelage	Main Cast; 12 episodes Satellite Award for Best Cast – Television Series
2014	Broad City	Mary	Episode: "Destination Wedding"
2015	Last Tango in Halifax	Ginika	Episode #3.4
2020	Grand Army	Lead Interviewer	Episode: "Making Moves"
2020	Chicago Med	Beverly MacNeal	Episode: "When Did We Begin to Change?"
