= Nina Sosanya =

British actress (born 1969)

- Born: Oluwakemi Nina Sosanya; 6 June 1969 (age 57); Islington, London, England
- Occupations: Actress; Narrator
- Years active: 1992–present

Oluwakemi Nina Sosanya (born 6 June 1969) is an English actress and narrator. She is most notable for her roles in Teachers, W1A, and Last Tango in Halifax.

== Early life and education ==
Oluwakemi Nina Sosanya was born in 1969 in Islington, London, to a Nigerian father and an English mother.

For a short time, she attended the Vale of Catmose College in Oakham and later trained at the Northern School of Contemporary Dance.

== Career ==
Sosanya has appeared in many roles in the theatre, on television and in films. Her first big break in theatre was in Anthony and Cleopatra at the National Theatre, and in television with the 2001 series Teachers when she appeared as English teacher Jenny Paige. She also appeared in Sorted, People Like Us, Love Actually, Nathan Barley, Renaissance, Casanova, as Karen Blaine in the Jonathan Creek episode "The Three Gamblers", Much Ado About Nothing, Cape Wrath/Meadowlands, the Doctor Who episode "Fear Her", and FM.

Sosanya appeared as Colly Trent in series 2 of the BBC television drama Five Days. She appeared in the BBC Four television series Twenty Twelve, a comedy about the London 2012 Olympic build up, and the BBC One drama series Silk and Hustle. She also made a brief appearance in the children's CBBC science fiction series, Wizards vs Aliens as Benny Sherwood's mother, Trisha.

Sosanya played the character Alibe Silver in Treasure Island (2012). She played a main character, Kate McKenzie, in series 1–3 of the BBC original drama Last Tango in Halifax during 2012–2015, and a main character, Lucy Freeman, in the TV series W1A in 2014. In 2015, she starred with Catherine Tate and Mark Gatiss in a new play, The Vote, in the run-up to the UK 2015 general election. In 2016, Sosanya appeared as DCI Laura Porter in the ITV series Marcella.

She appeared as Sister Mary Loquacious in the first series of Good Omens in 2018. It was announced in January 2022 that she would be reappearing in the second series. In season 2, she appeared as Nina. Neil Gaiman, the writer and showrunner, confirmed that the character was named Nina as he had always planned for her to be played by Sosanya.

In 2019, Sosanya narrated the CBeebies bedtime TV series, Moon and Me which is set in a toy house and follows the lives of toylike characters: Moon Baby, Pepi Nana, Sleepy Dibillo, Lambkin, Little Nana, Mr. Onion and Collywobble. There are 50 episodes.

In 2021, it was announced that she had been cast as lead warden Leigh in Channel 4 drama, Screw. It was broadcast in January 2022.

=== Theatre ===
In 2003, she played Rosalind in As You Like It with the Royal Shakespeare Company (RSC) at the Swan Theatre, Stratford-upon-Avon. In 2008, she returned to the RSC to play Rosaline in Love's Labour's Lost and, in 2009, appeared in a radio adaptation of a story from the short story collection The State of the Art. In January 2010, Sosanya appeared as Mae Pollock in Tennessee Williams' play Cat on a Hot Tin Roof at the Novello Theatre, London. In 2014, she appeared in the world premiere production of Privacy at the Donmar Warehouse, London. In 2016, she appeared in the world premiere production of Elegy at the Donmar Warehouse. In 2024, she appeared in Alexander Zeldin's play The Other Place at the National Theatre.

=== Audiobooks ===
Sosanya reads the part of Sephy on the audio book versions of Malorie Blackman's Noughts and Crosses series. She plays the lead in the audio adaptation of the 2000ad sci-fi comic series Brink.

== Personal life ==
Sosanya mentioned a male partner on The Graham Norton Show in 2020.

== Filmography ==
| Year | Title | Role | Notes |
|---|---|---|---|
| 1992 | The Bill | Linda | Episode: "World to Rights" |
| 1992 | Prime Suspect 2 | Joanne Fagunwa | Television film |
| 1994 | Hercules and the Amazon Women | Chilla | Television film |
| 1999 | Jonathan Creek | Karen Blaine | Episode: "The Three Gamblers" |
| 2000 | Doctors | Jasmine | Episode: "Late Action Hero" |
| 2000 | Urban Gothic | Ezili/Gabrielle | Episode: "Deptford Voodoo" |
| 2001 | People Like Us | Cassie Pearson | 2 episodes |
| 2001–2002 | Teachers | Jenny Paige | 18 episodes |
| 2002 | The Jury | Marcia Thomas | 6 episodes |
| 2003 | Serious & Organised | Emma Brown | Episode: "1.3" |
| 2003 | The Debt | DI Kate Jaspers | TV film |
| 2003 | Code 46 | Anya | |
| 2003 | Love Actually | Annie | Nominated – Phoenix Film Critics Society Award for Best Cast |
| 2005 | The Afternoon Play | Claire Cotton | Episode: "The Good Citizen". Radio play |
| 2005 | Nathan Barley | Sasha | 5 episodes |
| 2005 | No Angels | Maggie McDonald | Episode: "2.2" |
| 2005 | Casanova | Bellino | 3 episodes |
| 2005 | Manderlay | Rose | |
| 2005 | Lie Still | Veronica | |
| 2005 | ShakespeaRe-Told | Margaret | Episode: "Much Ado About Nothing" |
| 2006 | Renaissance | Reparez | Voice |
| 2006 | Doctor Who | Trish Webber | Episode: "Fear Her" |
| 2006 | Sorted | Nancy | 6 episodes |
| 2006 | Wide Sargasso Sea | Christophine | Television film |
| 2007 | Kitchen | Christine | Television film |
| 2007 | Reichenbach Falls | Sinead Burns | Television film |
| 2007 | Cape Wrath | Samantha | 8 episodes |
| 2007 | Sold | Kate | Episode: "1.1" |
| 2008 | Messiah: The Rapture | Sarah Templar | |
| 2008 | Bonekickers | Rachel | Episode: "The Cradle of Civilisation" |
| 2009 | FM | Jane Edwards | 6 episodes |
| 2009 | Framed | Marnie Pope | Television film |
| 2010 | Five Days | Colly Trent | 5 episodes |
| 2011 | Twenty Twelve | Nina Christiani | TV series (1 episode: "Episode No. 1.2") |
| 2011 | Silk | Kate Brockman | TV series (6 episodes) |
| 2012 | Hustle | Linda Runcorn | Episode: "Curiosity Caught the Kat" |
| 2012 | Treasure Island | Alibe Silver | Television film |
| 2012 | Vera | Chief Superintendent Rachel Waite | Episode: "The Ghost Position" |
| 2012 | Silent Witness | DS Brooks | 2 episodes |
| 2012 | Lewis | Lilian Hunter | Episode: "The Indelible Stain" |
| 2012–2013 | Wizards vs Aliens | Trisha Sherwood | 5 episodes |
| 2012–2015 | Last Tango in Halifax | Kate McKenzie | 18 episodes |
| 2014 | Shetland | Willow Reeves | Episodes: "Dead Water, Parts 1 & 2" |
| 2014 | W1A | Lucy Freeman | 10 episodes |
| 2015 | The Vote | Laura Williams | Play; broadcast live on TV |
| 2015 | You, Me and the Apocalypse | U.S. Marshall Tess Carter | 3 episodes |
| 2016 | David Brent: Life on the Road | Dr Vivienne Keating | |
| 2016 | Marcella | DCI Laura Porter | 8 episodes |
| 2017 | You, Me and Him | Dr. Parks | |
| 2017 | Nile Rodgers: How to Make it in the Music Business | Narrator | 3 episodes |
| 2017 | Strike Back: Retribution | Colonel Adeena Donovan | 10 episodes |
| 2017 | The Highway Rat | Duck (voice) | Television film |
| 2018 | Killing Eve | Jess | 4 episodes |
| 2018 | Hilda | Additional voices | 13 episodes; voice only |
| 2018 | Women on the Verge | Katie | 6 episodes |
| 2019 | Moon and Me | Narrator | 50 episodes |
| 2019 | Red Joan | Ms Hart – Special Branch | |
| 2019 | Thunderbirds Are Go | Asher (voice) | Episode: "SOS - Part 1" |
| 2019 | The Dark Crystal: Age of Resistance | Maudra Mera (voice) | Episode: "By Gelfling Hand..." |
| 2019–2022 | His Dark Materials | Elaine Parry | 6 episodes |
| 2019, 2023 | Good Omens | Sister Mary Loquacious (season 1) Nina (Season 2) | 2 episodes (season 1) All 6 episodes (season 2) |
| 2020 | Make Me Famous | Stephanie | Television film |
| 2020 | Brave New World | Mustafa Mond | 9 episodes |
| 2020 | Staged | Jo | 4 episodes |
| 2020 | Little Birds | Lili von X | 6 episodes |
| 2020 | Roald & Beatrix: The Tail of the Curious Mouse | Anne Landy | Television film |
| 2021–2022 | Staged | Herself | |
| 2022 | Brian and Charles | Pam | |
| 2022–2023 | Screw | Leigh Henry | 12 episodes |
| 2023 | The End We Start From | G | |
| 2024 | Baby Reindeer | Liz | 7 episodes |
| 2025 | Man vs. Baby | Diana | Episode: "Chapter 1" |
| 2026 | Shaun the Sheep: The Beast of Mossy Bottom | The Vet (voice) | |
| TBA | Quentin Blake's Box of Treasures | Angela Bowling (voice) | Post-production |
