= Sally Wainwright =

British television writer, producer and director (born 1963)

Sally Wainwright OBE
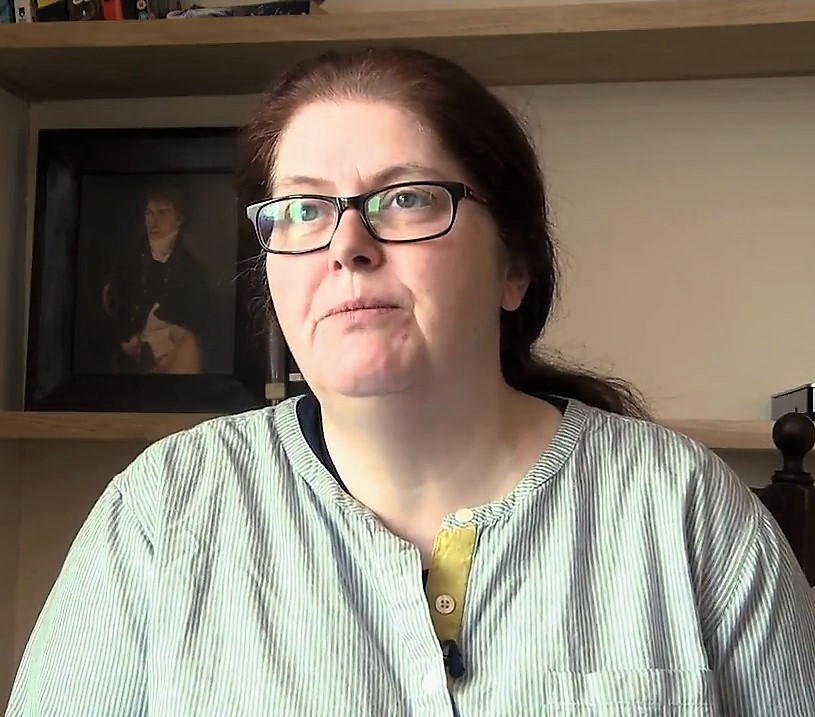
- Wainwright in 2018
- Born: Sally Wainwright; 11 September 1963 (age 62); Huddersfield, West Riding of Yorkshire, England
- Education: University of York
- Occupations: Television writer; director; producer; playwright
- Years active: 1991–present
- Spouse: Austin Sherlaw-Johnson (m. 1990; sep. 2019)
- Children: 2

Sally Wainwright OBE (born 1963) is an English television writer, producer, and director. She is known for her television dramas, often set in her native West Yorkshire and featuring strong female characters, such as Scott & Bailey (2011–2016), Last Tango in Halifax (2012–2020), Happy Valley (2014–2023) and Riot Women (2025–).

Wainwright began her career as a scriptwriter on the long-running radio serial drama The Archers, and worked on the television soap operas Emmerdale and Coronation Street in the 1990s. Her first original drama, At Home with the Braithwaites, aired between 2000 and 2003. After two self-described "flops" in the mid-2000s, Wainwright found success with Unforgiven (2009), for which she won the Royal Television Society's Writer of the Year Award. Other work includes historical drama Gentleman Jack (2019–2022), and the comedy-drama series Riot Women. Last Tango in Halifax won the British Academy Television Award for Best Drama Series in 2013, and Happy Valley won the same award in both 2015 and 2017.

== Early life and education ==
Sally Wainwright was born in 1963 in Huddersfield, West Yorkshire, to Dorothy (née Crowther) and Harry Wainwright. She has one sister.

She was brought up in Sowerby Bridge, where she attended Triangle Church of England Primary School and Sowerby Bridge High School. She attended the University of York, studying English and Related Literature.

Wainwright said that she had always wanted to write, had started writing from the time she was nine years old, and wanted to write for Coronation Street. She said that when she was 16 years old, she saw a play called Bastard Angel by playwright Barrie Keeffe at the Royal Shakespeare Company, and was impressed by its short sentences and naturalistic approach to dialogue.

== Career ==
While at the University of York, Wainwright took an original play called Hanging On to the Edinburgh Festival and in the process found an agent, Meg Davis, for her writing. Meanwhile, she worked as a bus driver. When she was 24, she left the driving job after she started writing for the Radio 4 series The Archers. One of her contributions was to write an atypical story for the long-running radio soap in which the village shop was robbed. After that she wrote for Coronation Street, developing her writing skills, from 1994 to 1999. She has since said that working on continuing drama was "a great education in discipline and a lesson that great stories are hard work". She was mentored by Kay Mellor, who encouraged her to stop writing for soaps and concentrate instead on original work. She created the TV series At Home with the Braithwaites about a woman who had secretly won the lottery. The programme was nominated for multiple awards. In 2006, she wrote the drama series Jane Hall, which depicts the life of a woman bus driver in London. Wainwright drew on her own experiences in scripting the series.

She wrote the three-part drama series Unforgiven, broadcast in 2009, that went on to win best series and best writer in the RTS Awards.

In 2011, she wrote Scott & Bailey, a series about two female police officers. The idea for the series came from the actresses Suranne Jones and Sally Lindsay and former Detective Inspector Diane Taylor, who assisted with bringing the series to air.

Wainwright based the plot of her series Last Tango in Halifax on the story of her mother, who was widowed in 2001. Her mother, Dorothy, moved to Oxfordshire to live with her daughter and rediscovered a lost love via Friends Reunited. With her mother's permission, Wainwright developed the story of how she remarried so rapidly, showing extracts from the series to her mother before broadcast. When she told the story to Nicola Shindler, she suggested she turn her mother's experience into a television series. Shindler became the series' executive producer. Both Last Tango in Halifax and her crime series Scott & Bailey were turned down by the BBC and ITV before being accepted retrospectively. The former was voted by BAFTA to be best series in 2012 and Wainwright was given the award for best writer.

Happy Valley, which was shot in Yorkshire's upper Upper Calder Valley and Hebden Bridge, stars Sarah Lancashire, whom Wainwright had in mind as she wrote the role. Wainwright made her directorial debut with episode 4 of the first series. Wainwright had previously said that she was willing to write a third series of Happy Valley, but had commitments to work on other projects, and in 2016 producer Nicola Shindler indicated that the third series would not air until 2018 at the earliest. In 2022, it was announced that a third series would debut on 1 January 2023. The final episode was broadcast on 5 February 2023.

Wainwright said in 2014 that her strong yet flawed female characters are "almost real" to her and arrive "fully formed" in her imagination. She has been a director and producer of some of her own television work, partly to ensure the scenery and dialogue reflects Yorkshire.

Wainwright wrote and directed a two-hour drama special for BBC One, To Walk Invisible, which aired in the UK in 2016 and in the US in 2017. Its subject is the Brontë family, particularly the relationship the three sisters, Anne, Emily and Charlotte, had with their brother, Branwell. While working on the drama, Wainwright said "I am thrilled beyond measure that I've been asked by the BBC to bring to life these three fascinating, talented, ingenious Yorkshire women."

In 2019, Wainwright's Gentleman Jack, a drama about the 19th-century Yorkshire landowner, diarist, and open lesbian, Anne Lister, played by Suranne Jones, and Lister's courtship of Ann Walker, played by Sophie Rundle, premiered on both BBC One in the UK and HBO in the US.

Her female-led highwaywoman epic Renegade Nell streamed on Disney+ in March 2024. October 2025 saw the release of her BBC One series Riot Women, about a group of women in Hebden Bridge forming a punk-rock band.

== Personal life ==
Wainwright married Ralph "Austin" Sherlaw-Johnson, an antiquarian sheet music dealer, son of the composer, pianist, and music scholar Robert Sherlaw Johnson. They have two sons and separated in 2019 after 29 years' marriage. As of 2023, Wainwright has a Maine Coon cat she says is the largest in the world.

Wainwright has said that she has "decided that [she is] slightly autistic" and that social interaction is quite painful for her.

== Recognition and honours ==
=== Personal ===
Wainwright won the 2009 Writer of the Year Award given by the RTS in 2009 for Unforgiven, which also won best TV series.

In 2016, Wainwright was made a Fellow of the Royal Television Society.

Wainwright was appointed Officer of the Order of the British Empire (OBE) in the 2020 Birthday Honours, for services to writing and television.

=== For works ===
Wainwright has been highly praised by many reviewers, and she is known for featuring "strong female characters" in her work and for the quality of her dialogue.

Her awards and honours include:

- 2003: Best Short Drama, Banff Festival, for The Wife of Bath's Tale
- 2009: RTS Awards, Writer of the Year, for Unforgiven
- 2009: RTS Awards, Best Drama Serial for Unforgiven
- 2011: RTS North West Awards, Best Writer for Scott & Bailey
- 2013: Sky WFTV Awards, Technicolor Writing Award
- 2013: BAFTA TV Craft Awards, Best Drama Writer
- 2013: BAFTA TV Craft Awards, Best Drama Series for Last Tango in Halifax
- 2014: Broadcast Awards, Best Drama Series for Happy Valley
- 2014: British Screenwriters' Awards, Best British TV Drama Writing for Happy Valley
- 2014: Crime Thriller Awards, Best TV Series for Happy Valley
- 2014: TV Choice Awards, Best New Drama for Happy Valley
- 2015: Broadcasting Press Guild Awards, Best Drama Writer
- 2015: BAFTA TV Craft Awards, Best Drama Writer
- 2015: Edgar Allan Poe Awards, Best Television Episode for Happy Valley (episode 1)
- 2015: WGGB Awards, Best Long Form TV Drama for Happy Valley
- 2015: Edinburgh TV Awards, Best Programme of the year for Happy Valley
- 2015: BAFTA Awards, Best Drama Series for Happy Valley
- 2016: Elected Fellow of the Royal Television Society
- 2017: RTS Programme Awards, Best Drama Writer for Happy Valley
- 2017: RTS Programme Awards, Judges' Award
- 2017:BAFTA Awards, Best Drama Series for Happy Valley
- 2017: BAFTA TV Craft Awards, Best Drama Writer for 'Happy Valley'
- 2020: Royal Television Society Awards, Best Drama Series Winner for 'Gentleman Jack'
- 2020: Freedom of The Borough of Calderdale
- 2020: Officer of the Order of the British Empire (OBE) in the 2020 Birthday Honours, for services to Writing and Television

== Credits ==
=== Television ===
| Year | Work | Credited as | | | | Notes |
| Year | Work | Writer | Creator | Producer | Director | Notes |
|---|---|---|---|---|---|---|
| 1991 | Emmerdale | Yes | No | No | No | 2 episodes |
| 1992–1995 | Children's Ward | Yes | No | No | No | Staff Writer |
| 1994 | The House of Windsor | Yes | No | No | No | 1 episode |
| 1994–1999 | Coronation Street | Yes | No | No | No | 57 episodes |
| 1994–1995 | Revelations | Yes | No | No | No | 5 episodes |
| 1999 | Bad Girls | Yes | No | No | No | 1 episode |
| 1999–2000 | Playing the Field | Yes | No | No | No | 5 episodes |
| 2000–2003 | At Home with the Braithwaites | Yes | Yes | Yes | No | Writer, creator and associate producer |
| 2002 | Sparkhouse | Yes | Yes | Yes | No | Wrote all 3 episodes; credited as co-producer |
| 2003 | The Canterbury Tales: The Wife of Bath | Yes | No | No | No | 1 episode |
| 2005 | ShakespeaRe-Told: The Taming of the Shrew | Yes | No | No | No | 1 episode |
| 2006 | Jane Hall | Yes | Yes | Yes | No | 6 episodes as writer, creator and co-producer |
| 2006 | The Amazing Mrs Pritchard | Yes | Yes | Yes | No | 6 episodes as writer, creator and associate producer |
| 2007 | Dead Clever | Yes | Yes | No | No | Television film |
| 2007 | Bonkers | Yes | Yes | No | No | 6 episodes |
| 2009 | Unforgiven | Yes | Yes | Yes | No | 3 episodes as writer, creator and executive producer |
| 2011–2016 | Scott & Bailey | Yes | Yes | Yes | No | 31 episodes, 19 as writer. Co-creator Diane Taylor; Based on an idea by Suranne Jones and Sally Lindsay |
| 2012–2020 | Last Tango in Halifax | Yes | Yes | Yes | No | 24 episodes as writer, creator and executive producer |
| 2013 | The Last Witch | Yes | Yes | Yes | No | Pilot episode/Television film |
| 2014–2023 | Happy Valley | Yes | Yes | Yes | Yes | 18 episodes as writer, creator and executive producer, 5 as director |
| 2016 | To Walk Invisible | Yes | Yes | Yes | Yes | Television film |
| 2019–2022 | Gentleman Jack | Yes | Yes | Yes | Yes | 8 episodes as writer, creator and executive producer, 4 as director |
| 2024 | Renegade Nell | Yes | Yes | Yes | No | |
| 2025–present | Riot Women | Yes | Yes | Yes | Yes | 6 episodes as writer, creator and co-producer, 3 as director |

=== Other ===
- 1986–1988: The Archers (Radio show: BBC Radio 4) − Writer (2 years)
- 2000: Emily Brontë's Lover (Radio show: BBC Radio 4) − Writer
- Hanging On (play)
