= Louis Greatorex =

British actor

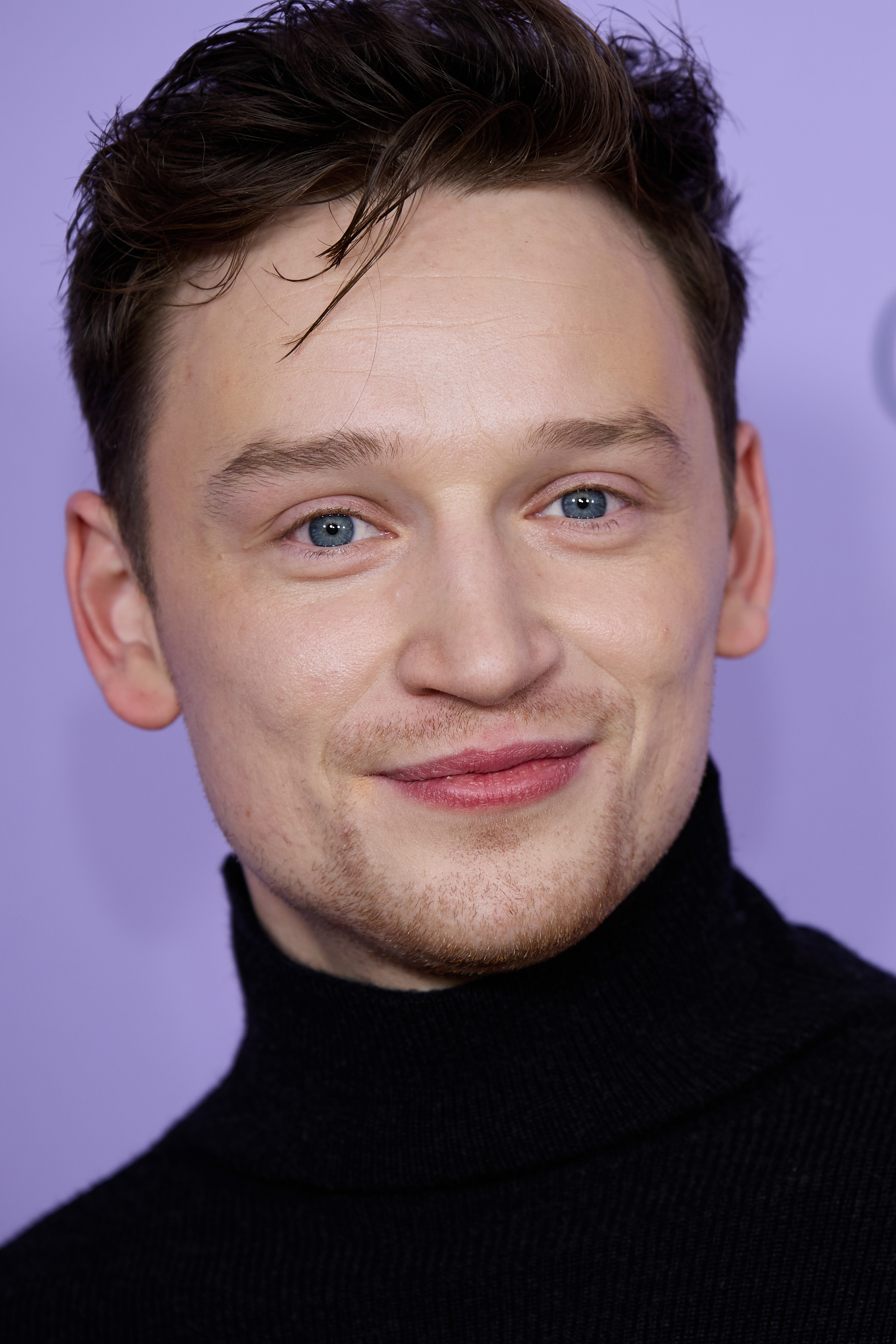
- Greatorex in 2024
- Born: 30 December 1996 (age 29); Derby, England
- Occupation: Actor
- Years active: 2009–present

Louis Greatorex (born 30 December 1996) is a British actor. On television, he is known for his role in the BBC One comedy-drama Last Tango in Halifax (2012–2020). His films include Layla (2024).

== Life and career ==
Greatorex is from Duffield, Derbyshire, the son of an IT professional and an HR administrator. He has one younger brother. Louis attended secondary school at the Ecclesbourne School in Duffield. From a young age Greatorex attended local drama workshops, including the Nottingham branch of the Central Junior Television Workshop. His theatre experience whilst attending the television workshop includes a role in a pantomime production of Peter Pan, and portraying the title role in a production of The Ritual Slaughter of Gorge Mastromas at Nottingham Contemporary. Greatorex also has experience of street theatre, having been named 'miming champion' at the Derby Arts festival in 2010.

He made his professional television debut in a 2010 episode of the situation comedy series The Legend of Dick and Dom. He also had a small role in the romantic comedy film My Last Five Girlfriends, which was released in 2009. Greatorex has portrayed the character of Lawrence in Last Tango in Halifax since 2012. He was put forward for his audition by the Central Junior Television Workshop, though almost missed the audition due to suffering from flu and losing his voice. He had to be persuaded by his family to attend the audition and did not expect to win the part due to symptoms of his illness.

As of 2015, Greatorex had signed with a London-based casting agency. In January 2015 he stated that he would like to pursue an acting career alongside his further education, having applied to study English literature in 2015.

== Filmography ==
=== Film ===
| Year | Film | Role | Notes |
|---|---|---|---|
| 2009 | My Last Five Girlfriends | Giles | |
| 2024 | Layla | Max | |

=== Television ===
| Year(s) | Title | Role | More information |
|---|---|---|---|
| 2010 | The Legend of Dick and Dom | Little Dick | 1 episode |
| 2012–2020 | Last Tango in Halifax | Lawrence Elliot | Main role; 5 series |
| 2017 | The Last Post | Lance Corporal Paul Stoneham | Series regular |
| 2018 | Safe | Henry Mason | Main role |
| 2019 | Death in Paradise | Owen Dacre | 1 episode |
| 2019 | The Bay | Sam Hesketh | Main role; series 1 |
| 2020 | Shepherds Delight | Narrator | Also director, writer, editor and producer |
| 2024 | Masters of the Air | Capt. Joseph Payne | Miniseries |
