= Anne Reid =

English actress (born 1935)

Anne Reid CBE
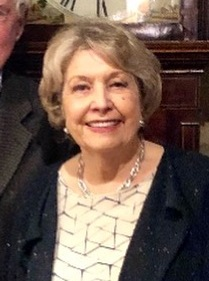
- Reid in 2019
- Born: 28 May 1935 (age 91); Jesmond, Newcastle upon Tyne, England
- Education: Royal Academy of Dramatic Art (Bachelor of Arts)
- Occupation: Actress
- Years active: 1957–present
- Spouse: Peter Eckersley (m. 1971; died 1981)
- Children: 1

Anne Reid (born 28 May 1935) is an English stage, film and television actress, known for her roles as Valerie Barlow in the soap opera Coronation Street (1961–1971); Jean in the sitcom dinnerladies (1998–2000); and her role as Celia Dawson in Last Tango in Halifax (2012–2020) for which she was nominated for the British Academy Television Award for Best Actress. A further nomination in the same category followed for playing Ann Moore-Martin in The Sixth Commandment (2023).

For her performance in the film The Mother (2003), Reid won the London Film Critics' Circle Award for British Actress of the Year and received a nomination for the BAFTA Award for Best Actress in a Leading Role. Other notable film roles include the voice of Wendolene Ramsbottom in Wallace and Gromit: A Close Shave (1995) and as Leslie Tiller in Hot Fuzz (2007).

== Early life ==
Reid was born in Newcastle upon Tyne, the daughter of Colin Norman Reid (1896–1970) and Annie Eliza (née Weetman) (1896–1980). She lived with her parents and three older brothers in Redcar, where she attended John Emmerson Batty primary school and the White House School. From the age of 11 she attended Penrhos College, a boarding school in North Wales, when her father was posted abroad as a foreign correspondent for The Daily Telegraph: she visited her parents occasionally in India, Tehran and Beirut in the school holidays. Upon leaving school she moved to London to attend the Royal Academy of Dramatic Art. She then became a stage manager and worked in repertory theatre.

== Television ==
=== Coronation Street ===
Although she had already appeared in other television programmes including The Benny Hill Show (1957), Hancock's Half Hour (1957) and The Adventures of Robin Hood (1958), Reid's first major acting role was as the character of Valerie Tatlock (later Barlow) on Coronation Street. Her character was very popular with the show's fans; as such, Valerie's marriage to Ken Barlow can be seen as an early example of a soap supercouple.

Valerie was the mother of the twins Susan and Peter. Reid joined the cast, initially for two months, starting in August 1961 and leaving in October. She returned to the programme to marry Ken on 1 August 1962, in a wedding watched by 15.8 million viewers. In 1965, Val and Ken had twins, and Granada Television received numerous congratulation gifts addressed to the couple.

In 1968, Reid played one of her most difficult parts in Coronation Street when Val was held hostage by a rapist. Although Val was not harmed, viewers sent in hate mail to the actor who played the rapist. In November 1970, Reid announced she was leaving Coronation Street. In a 2011 interview with the Radio Times, Reid said she had enough and wanted to do other things:

I was a basket case when I left! I'd already had too much of it. That kind of work suits some people, but it didn't suit me. It was my decision to leave and I was desperate, really desperate, to go. Because I knew I was good at comedy and there was no way that Valerie Barlow was ever going to be funny.

On 27 January 1971, 18.26 million viewers watched as Valerie Barlow was written out of the soap, dying after being electrocuted by a hairdryer with a faulty plug. On 1 and 3 February 1971, 18.92 million people watched the aftermath and the character's funeral.

=== Later work ===
Following a break from acting to bring up her son, during which time she made occasional TV appearances for Granada, such as in Crown Court, Reid resumed her career on stage and television in the 1980s. Reid was a regular performer with Victoria Wood, appearing in several of Wood's projects, including Victoria Wood as Seen on TV, the series Victoria Wood in 1989, and the drama Pat and Margaret in 1994. From 1998 to 2000, Reid played the major role of Jean in the BBC comedy series dinnerladies written by and starring Wood, and has appeared in other television programmes including Boon (1988), Casualty (1992), Heartbeat (two different roles in 1993 and 1997) and Hetty Wainthropp Investigates (1996). She played Alice Conway in the ITV adaptation of Catherine Cookson’s novel The Wingless Bird in 1997. She also made an appearance in the Doctor Who serial The Curse of Fenric which was broadcast in October 1989.

In 2003, Reid had a part in Midsomer Murders in the episode "A Tale of Two Hamlets" as Sarah Proudie and a main part in the comedy drama The Booze Cruise. She also had a major role in the ITV drama series Life Begins, which ran from 2004 to 2006, in which she appeared alongside Caroline Quentin and Frank Finlay. In 2005 she had a supporting role in the BBC's adaptation of Bleak House and in 2006 made a brief appearance in Jane Eyre.

On 31 March 2007, Reid appeared for a second time in the series Doctor Who in the episode "Smith and Jones". In the episode, she played Florence Finnegan: a shape-shifting, blood-sucking alien known as a Plasmavore, who took on the guise of a human. That same year she appeared in the ITV television adaptation of the novel The Bad Mother's Handbook, co-starring alongside Catherine Tate.

In February 2008, Reid appeared as the mother of Monica Gallagher, Joan, who was suffering from Alzheimer's in the Channel 4 drama Shameless. In October 2008, she played the title role in In Love with Barbara on BBC Four, a biographical film of Barbara Cartland.

In 2009, Reid appeared in the television series Agatha Christie's Marple in the episode Nemesis. From 2009 to 2010 she starred as Vera alongside Maureen Lipman as Irene in an ITV3 adaptation of the BBC Radio 4 series Ladies of Letters.

In 2010, she began playing Mrs Thackeray, the cook, in the BBC's short-lived revival series of Upstairs Downstairs, and also appeared in Five Days, New Tricks and Moving On. In 2011 Reid had a major part in Marchlands, a five-part ITV supernatural drama, made a guest appearance in Doc Martin and played a supporting role in The Jury II.

In 2012 Reid began starring as Celia alongside Sir Derek Jacobi as Alan in the BBC romantic comedy-drama series, Last Tango in Halifax. Reid was nominated for the 2013 British Academy Television Award for Best Actress for this role.

In 2013, she appeared in the second series of the BBC drama Prisoners' Wives. She also starred with Katherine Kelly in The Last Witch, part of a series of original dramas for Sky Living and appeared in the final Agatha Christie's Poirot mystery, Curtain: Poirot’s Last Case as Daisy Luttrell. The following year, she guest-starred in "Sardines", the first episode of the BBC anthology series Inside No. 9. She also starred alongside Lee Ingleby and Ralf Little in the six-part BBC drama series Our Zoo.

Reid took part in an episode of the BBC genealogy series Who Do You Think You Are? in September 2015.

In 2017, Reid starred alongside Timothy Spall in "The Commuter", an episode of the Channel 4/Amazon Video anthology series Electric Dreams. In 2018 and 2019, she starred alongside Alison Steadman and John Cleese in a new BBC comedy series, Hold the Sunset.

In 2019 Reid co-starred in a six-part BBC drama series, Years and Years, starring Emma Thompson. Reid played the matriarch of the central family, Muriel Deacon. From 2019 to 2023 she starred as the wealthy Lady Denham in the ITV adaptation of Jane Austen's unfinished novel, Sanditon.

In 2023 she starred alongside Timothy Spall and Éanna Hardwicke in the BBC true-life crime drama The Sixth Commandment, for which she nominated for the 2024 British Academy Television Award for Best Actress.

In 2024 Reid was announced as being in the cast of a new BBC drama series, Riot Women. The series broadcast in late 2025.

== Film ==
Reid voiced Wendolene Ramsbottom in the Wallace & Gromit film A Close Shave (1995). Her other film appearances include Love and Death on Long Island (1997); The Mother (2003), for which her performance secured her a nomination for the BAFTA Award for Best Actress in a Leading Role in 2004; Hot Fuzz (2007); Cemetery Junction (2010); and Song for Marion (2013).

Additionally, Reid filmed a minor role as a lesbian headmistress in the movie Love Actually (2003), but Reid is not credited in the cast list since all her scenes were ultimately deleted, because they were not central to the main plot. The scenes can, however, be viewed in the deleted scenes on the Love Actually DVD.

== Theatre ==
In 2002 Reid appeared in the premiere of The York Realist at the Royal Court Theatre, which later transferred to the West End.

From September 2005 to January 2006, she appeared on stage in the West End in Epitaph for George Dillon.

In June 2007, Reid played the role of Jack's mother in Stephen Sondheim's Into the Woods, at the Royal Opera House in Covent Garden.

From January to May 2008, Reid appeared in the National Theatre's production of Happy Now?, a new play by Lucinda Coxon.

From March to May 2009, Reid appeared at the Donmar Warehouse in Dimetos, a 1975 play by Athol Fugard.

From September to November 2012, Reid appeared at London's Old Vic, in a production of Ibsen's Hedda Gabler, starring Sheridan Smith.

On 26 January 2015, Reid played Madame Armfeldt in a special concert version of A Little Night Music, at the Palace Theatre, to celebrate 40 years since the musical premiered in the West End.

In July and August 2016, Reid appeared at the Minerva Theatre, Chichester alongside James Bolam in a new play, Fracked! Or: Please Don't Use the F-Word by Alistair Beaton. The play was revived for a national tour in April and May 2017.

From October to December 2017, Reid returned to the West End opposite Eve Best in Oscar Wilde's A Woman of No Importance at the Vaudeville Theatre.

From March to May 2023, Reid appeared in the UK premiere of Marjorie Prime by Jordan Harrison, at the Menier Chocolate Factory in London.

Reid played Queen Elizabeth II in a new play, By Royal Appointment, by Daisy Goodwin. The play, which also starred Caroline Quentin, opened at the Theatre Royal Bath in June 2025, followed by a tour.

Reid co-starred alongside Mark Strong and Lesley Manville in the Broadway transfer of Oedipus at Studio 54 from October 2025 to February 2026.

== Filmography ==
=== Film ===
Year	Title	Role	Notes
1958	Passport to Shame	Woman Getting Married	Uncredited role
1995	Wallace & Gromit: A Close Shave	Wendolene	Short film, voice role
1997	Love and Death on Long Island	Maureen	
2000	Liam	Mrs. Abernathy	
2003	The Mother	May	
2003	Love Actually	Headmistress	Uncredited role (scenes deleted)
2005	A Little Trip to Heaven	Martha	
2007	Hot Fuzz	Leslie Tiller	Was murdered
2007	Hit for Six	Show Producer	
2007	Savage Grace	Nini Daly	
2008	Affinity	Mrs. Brink	
2008	Faintheart	Barbara Wallace	
2010	Cemetery Junction	Freddie's Gran	
2011	Foster	Diane	Also known as Angel in the House
2012	Song for Marion	Brenda	
2013	Believe	Jean Busby	
2013	Tea Time in Haworth	Jean	Short film
2015	A Grand Night In: The Story of Aardman	Herself	Documentary
2016	Kaleidoscope	Aileen	
2017	Romans	Mother	Also known as Retaliation
2017	The Snowman	Mrs. Bendiksen	
2018	A Woman of No Importance	Lady Hunstanton	Filmed live at The Vaudeville Theatre, London
2019	The Aeronauts	Ethel Glaisher	
2020	The Nest	Rory's Mum	
2021	SAS: Red Notice	Charlotte	
2023	The Trouble with Jessica	Miranda	

Key
†	Denotes works that have not yet been released

=== Television ===
Year	Title	Role	Notes
1957	The Benny Hill Show		Episode: "#2.2"
1957	The Machine Breakers	Mary	3 episodes
1957–1959	Hancock's Half Hour	Actress / Young Wife / Secretary	5 episodes
1958	ITV Play of the Week	Alice	Episode: "The Rossiters"
1958	Time Is the Enemy	Patience Mee	7 episodes
1958	The Adventures of Robin Hood	Betsey / Alison / Mellissa	4 episodes
1958	Murder Bag		Episode: "Lockhart Watches the Clock"
1959	Crime Sheet		Episode: "Lockhart Sees a Chemist"
1961–1971	Coronation Street	Valerie Tatlock / Valerie Barlow	Recurring role, 632 episodes
1962	Television Club	Nurse	Episode: "The Wade Family: The Hospital"
1969-1970	All Star Comedy Carnival	Valerie Barlow	Television Christmas special
1972	ITV Playhouse	Lily	Episode: "Buggins' Empire"
1973	Play for Today	Eileen Morris	Episode: "Edward G: Like the Filmstar"
1973	Six Days of Justice	Margery Birkenshaw	Episode: "The Complaint"
1975	Nightingale's Boys	Claire Selby	Episode: "Spivvy"
1976	Red Letter Day	Sheila Harding	Episode: "Matchfit"
1976	Heydays Hotel	Merel Roberts	Television film
1977	Fathers and Families	Martha Frend	Mini-series, 1 episode: "Left for Dead"
1978	ITV Playhouse	Alice	Episode: "One of the Boys"
1978	Strangers	Audrey Stephens	Episode: "Right and Wrong"
1978	Crown Court	Mrs. Grace Cook / Florence Davenport	6 episodes: "Michael: Parts 1–3" and "A Man with Everything: Parts 1–3"
1979	Leave it to Charlie	Mrs. Hunnicutt	Episode: "Guess Who's Coming to Dinner"
1979–1980	The Mallens	Mathilda Bensham	4 episodes
1981	My Father's House	Aunt Kitty	Mini-series, 3 episodes
1984	Love and Marriage	Ruth	Episode: "Lucifer"
1985	The Practice	Sylvia Rush	4 episodes
1985	Bleak House	Mrs. Bagnet	Mini-series, 1 episode: "#1.7"
1985	Shine On Harvey Moon	Joan	Episode: "All or Nothing at All"
1986	Victoria Wood: As Seen on TV	Pam Twill	Episode: "#2.1"
1987	Screen Two	Mrs. Hawke	Episode: "Inappropriate Behaviour"
1988	Boon	Yvonne Temple	Episode: "Beef Encounter"
1989	Doctor Who	Nurse Crane	Serial: The Curse of Fenric
1989	4 Play	Pam Radley	Episode: "Dawn and the Candidate"
1989	Victoria Wood	Enid / Sheila	2 episodes: "Mens Sana in Thingummy Doodah" and "The Library"
1989	About Face	Geraldine	Episode: "Mrs. Worthington's Daughter"
1990	A Bit of Fry and Laurie		Episode: "#2.3"
1990	Made in Heaven	Wilma	Episode: "The Big Match"
1991	Josie Smith	Miss Potts	2 episodes
1991	The Upper Hand	Nurse Edwards	Episode: "The Anniversary"
1991	Rich Tea and Sympathy	Sally	6 episodes
1991	Very Big Very Soon	Susan Driscoll	Episode: "The Taxman"
1992	Casualty	Barbara	Episode: "Will You Still Love Me?"
1992	The Ruth Rendell Mysteries	Joyce Virson	2 episodes: "Kissing the Gunner's Daughter: Parts One & Two"
1992	Crime Story	Muriel McKay	Episode: "Gone Too Far: The Mystery of Mrs. Muriel McKay"
1992	An Ungentlemanly Act	Mrs. Mozeley	Television film
1992–1994	Firm Friends	Wendy Holmes	6 episodes
1993	The Bill	Mrs. Proctor	Episode: "Pride and Joy"
1993	Micky Love	Jenny	Television film
1993	Heartbeat	Marjorie Doubleday	Episode: "Baby Blues"
1993–1999	Peak Practice	Rita Barrat	12 episodes
1994	Pat and Margaret	Maeve	Television film
1994	Seaforth	Aunt Enid	Mini-series, 3 episodes
1994	Where the Buffalo Roam	Pam	Television film
1995	The Infiltrator	Ingrid Fischer	Television film
1995	Roughnecks	Renie	3 episodes
1996	Hetty Wainthropp Investigates	Hilda	Episode: "A High Profile"
1996	Sometime, Never	Annette	Episode: "Getting Results"
1996–1997	Paul Merton in Galton and Simpson's...	Mother / Gwen / Mrs. Thomson	3 episodes
1997	The Wingless Bird	Alice Conway	Mini-series, 3 episodes
1997	Spark	Mrs Rudge	6 episodes
1997	Next of Kin	Patsy	Episode: "Neighbours"
1997	Heartbeat	Aunt Alison	Episode: "Affairs of the Heart"
1998–1999	Playing the Field	Mrs. Gill	6 episodes
1998–2000	dinnerladies	Jean	15 episodes
1999	Lost for Words	Gloria	Television film
2000	Victoria Wood with All the Trimmings	Various characters	Television special
2001	Linda Green	Yvonne Mott	Episode: "Rest in Peace"
2001	Hearts and Bones	Annie Rose	2 episodes: "#2.4" and "#2.6"
2001–2002	Dalziel and Pascoe	Harriet Clifford - Dalziel's Sister	2 episodes: "Truth and Consequences" and "Sins of the Fathers"
2002	Sweet Charity	Agnes	Television film
2003	Midsomer Murders	Sarah Proudie	Episode: "A Tale of Two Hamlets"
2003	The Booze Cruise	Grace	Television film
2003	The Young Visiters	Mrs. Monticue	Television film
2004	Rose and Maloney	Bea Linden	2 episodes: "Daniel Berrington: Parts 1 & 2"
2004–2006	Life Begins	Brenda Thornhill	16 episodes
2005	Bleak House	Mrs. Rouncewell	Mini-series, 9 episodes
2005	The Booze Cruise II: The Treasure Hunt	Grace Stringer	Television film
2006	The True Voice of Murder		Television film
2006	The Booze Cruise III: The Scattering	Grace	Television film
2006	Jane Eyre	Gypsy Woman	Mini-series, 1 episode
2007	The Bad Mother's Handbook	Nancy Hesketh	Television film
2007	Doctor Who	Florence Finnegan	Episode: "Smith and Jones"
2007	Agatha Christie's Marple	Sister Agnes	Episode: "Nemesis"
2008	Shameless	Joan Dallimore	Episode: "Absent Parents"
2008	In Love with Barbara	Barbara Cartland	Television film
2009–2010	Ladies of Letters	Vera Small	20 episodes
2010	Five Days	Jen Mason	5 episodes
2010	New Tricks	Sophie Urquhart	Episode: "It Smells of Books"
2010	Moving On	Diane	Episode: "I am Darleen Fyles"
2010–2012	Upstairs, Downstairs	Mrs. Clarice Thackeray	12 episodes
2011	Marchlands	Ruth Bowen	Mini-series, 4 episodes
2011	The Jury	June Brierley	5 episodes
2011	Doc Martin	Mrs. Dingley	Episode: "Cats and Sharks"
2011	Grandpa in My Pocket	Madame Vibrato	Episode: "Boom a Boom Whoop Zing Zoo!"
2012–2020	Last Tango in Halifax	Celia	24 episodes
2013	Prisoners' Wives	Margaret	4 episodes
2013	The Last Witch	Miranda	Television film
2013	Agatha Christie's Poirot	Daisy Luttrell	Episode: "Curtain: Poirot's Last Case"
2014	Inside No 9	Geraldine	Episode: "Sardines"
2014	Our Zoo	Lucy Mottershead	Mini-series, 6 episodes
2017	Philip K. Dick's Electric Dreams	Martine	Episode: "The Commuter"
2018	Claude	Dame Mumsie Turret	Episode: "A Good Night's Sleep", voice role
2018–2019	Hold the Sunset	Queenie	12 episodes
2019	Years and Years	Muriel Deacon	Mini-series, 6 episodes
2019–2023	Sanditon	Lady Denham	20 episodes
2023	The Sixth Commandment	Ann Moore-Martin	Mini-series, 3 episodes
2025	Riot Women	Nancy Gaskell	4 episodes
2026	Youth	Charlotte	4 episodes

== Awards and nominations ==
Year	Award	Work	Result
2003	European Film Award for Best Actress	The Mother	Nominated
2004	BAFTA Film Award for Best Actress in a Leading Role	The Mother	Nominated
2004	London Film Critics Circle Award for British Actress of the Year	The Mother	Won
2004	British Independent Film Award for Best Actress	The Mother	Nominated
2004	European Film Award Best Actress Audience Award	The Mother	Nominated
2013	Satellite Award for Best Actress in a Drama Series	Last Tango in Halifax	Nominated
2013	BAFTA TV Award for Best Actress	Last Tango in Halifax	Nominated
2024	BAFTA TV Award for Best Actress	The Sixth Commandment	Nominated

Reid was appointed Member of the Order of the British Empire (MBE) in the 2010 Birthday Honours and Commander of the Order of the British Empire (CBE) in the 2025 New Year Honours, both for services to drama.

== See also ==
- List of British actors
