= Nicola Shindler =

British television producer and executive

Nicola Shindler OBE
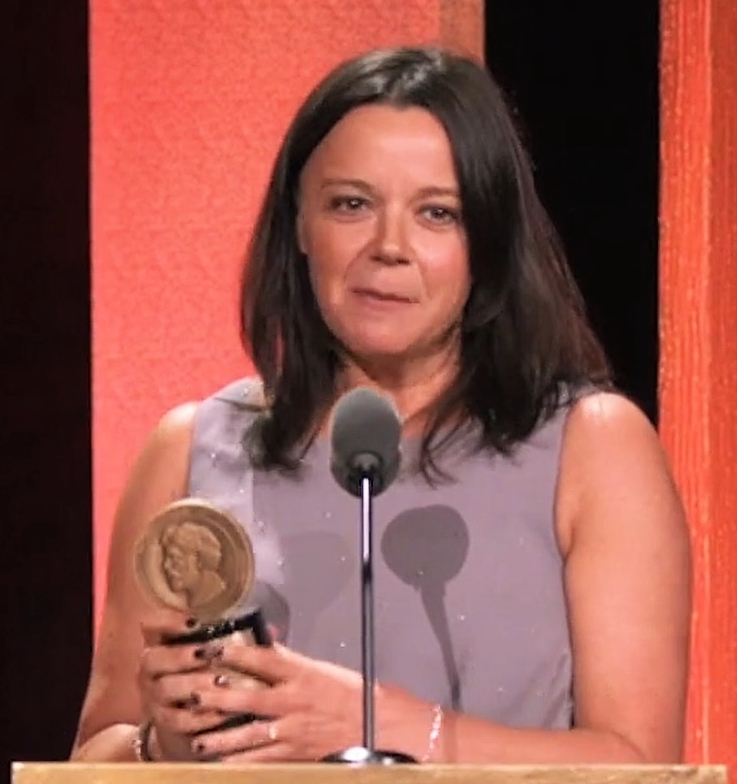
- Shindler receiving a 2016 Peabody Award
- Born: 8 October 1968 (age 57); Rochdale, England
- Occupation: Television producer
- Years active: 1993–present
- Notable work: Queer as Folk; Scott & Bailey; Last Tango in Halifax; Happy Valley; It’s a Sin
- Spouse: Matt Greenhalgh
- Children: 3

Nicola Shindler OBE (born 8 October 1968) is a British television producer and executive, and founder of the independent television drama production company Quay Street Productions, having founded and run Red Production Company from 1998 to 2020. She has won eleven BAFTA TV Awards.

== Early life and education ==
Shindler was born in Rochdale, England, the daughter of school teacher Gay Shindler (née Kenton) and solicitor Geoffrey Shindler. She grew up in the Whitefield area of Greater Manchester.

Shindler attended Bury Grammar School from 1979 to 1987. She graduated with a bachelor's degree in history from Gonville and Caius College, Cambridge.

== Career ==
Shindler first started out working as a sales manager in the sales department at Royal Court Theatre, which she chose because it was the home of new writing. She eventually started working as a script reader there but realised after a couple of years that she was more interested in the process of writing and working with writers in television versus theatre.

Shindler then got a job at the BBC as a trainee script editor. Part of the responsibilities of that job in the early days was reading scripts that had been accumulating in the basement of the BBC for over 10 years. Shindler says that it was educational and she got a reputation as a hard worker from clearing this huge backlog.

Shindler worked at Granada Television, for whom she first came to prominence as a script editor on the drama series Cracker (1993). She then went on to work as assistant producer on the BBC's Our Friends in the North (1996) and producer on Hillsborough, a dramatised account of the 1989 football stadium disaster. All three starred actor Christopher Eccleston, who subsequently featured in several dramas for Shindler's Red Production Company.

In 1998, Shindler formed Red Production Company – named after the nickname of Shindler's favourite football team, Manchester United – in Manchester. Its first project, with Shindler producing, was writer Russell T Davies' gay drama serial Queer as Folk. Queer as Folk gave Red a reputation as producers of noteworthy drama, and they followed this up with subsequent series for Channel 4 such as Love in the 21st Century (1999) and Queer as Folk 2 (2000).

Red has since produced dramas for BBC One, BBC Two, and ITV including Clocking Off (2000–03), Flesh and Blood (2002), Bob and Rose (2001) and The Second Coming (2003).

In addition to the ITV series, Scott & Bailey, Shindler produced the award-winning Happy Valley, which is set in the Calder Valley and environs and stars Sarah Lancashire. Sally Wainwright credits Shindler with bringing Last Tango in Halifax to BBC TV. In December 2013, it was announced that Shindler had sold a majority stake Red Production Company to the French media company StudioCanal.

Other productions produced by Shindler at Red are 2016's The Five and 2017's Trust Me, alongside 2018's Come Home and Harlan Coben’s Safe, 2019's Years and Years from Russell T. Davies, and Traces, a second series of which is due in 2021, and Harlan Coben’s The Stranger (2020)

Further new dramas produced by executive produced by Shindler due in 2021 include Finding Alice, It’s a Sin, Ridley Road, No Return, Traces Series 2 and Stay Close.

In 2021, Shindler launched new scripted production company Quay Street Productions. Sited within ITV Studios, the label is based in Central Manchester and focuses on producing premium drama for the UK and international market.

== Personal life ==
Shindler lives and works in Manchester, England. Shindler is married to writer Matt Greenhalgh, they have two daughters and a son.

== Honours ==
- 2003: The Guardian – Media top 100
- 2009: Manchester Metropolitan University, Honorary Doctorate of Arts
- 2013: BBC Radio 4, Woman's Hour – Power List 100 most powerful women in the United Kingdom
- 2015: The Hollywood Reporter – 25 Most Powerful Women in Global TV
- 2016: Peabody Award for Happy Valley
- 2017: Women in Film and Television International – Women in Film and Television Award
- 2019: Officer of the Order of the British Empire (OBE) in the 2019 Birthday Honours for services to broadcasting

== Awards ==
- 1997: BAFTA TV Award, Best Single Drama for Hillsborough – with Katy Jones, Charles McDougall, Jimmy McGovern
- 1997: Munich Film Festival, VFF TV Movie Award, Best International Television Production for Hillsborough
- 2001: BAFTA TV Award, Best Drama Series for Clocking Off – with Ann Harrison-Baxter, Paul Abbott
- 2002: BAFTA TV Award, Best Drama Serial for Bob & Rose (nomination) – with Ann Harrison-Baxter, Russell T. Davies
- 2002: BAFTA TV Award, Best Drama Series for Clocking Off (nomination) – with Juliet Charlesworth, Paul Abbott
- 2003: BAFTA TV Award, Best Drama Series for Clocking Off (nomination) – with Paul Abbott, Juliet Charlesworth
- 2005: Royal Television Society, RTS Television Award, Best Drama Serial for Conviction (nomination) – with Marc Munden, Bill Gallagher, Ann Harrison-Baxter, David Richards
- 2008: BAFTA TV Award, Best Single Drama for The Mark of Cain – with Tony Marchant, Lynn Horsford, Marc Munden
- 2008: Broadcasting Press Guild Award, Best Single Drama for The Mark of Cain (nomination) – with Tony Marchant, Marc Munden, Lynn Horsford
- 2008: Monte-Carlo TV Festival, Golden Nymph for Best Television Film for The Mark of Cain – with Marc Munden, Lynn Horsford, Tony Marchant
- 2010: BAFTA TV Award, Best Drama Serial for Unforgiven (nomination) – with Sally Wainwright, Karen Lewis, David Evans
- 2013: BAFTA TV Award, Best Mini-Series for Last Tango in Halifax – with Sally Wainwright, Euros Lyn, Karen Lewis
- 2015: BAFTA TV Award, Best Mini-Series for Prey (nomination) – with Nick Murphy, Tom Sherry, Chris Lunt
- 2017: BAFTA TV Award, Best Drama Series for Happy Valley – with Sally Wainwright. Juliet Charlesworth, Neasa Hardiman
- 2017: BAFTA Television Craft Award, Best Drama Series for Happy Valley (nomination) – with Sally Wainwright, Juliet Charlesworth, Neasa Hardiman
- 2017: Banff Rockie Award, Best Mini-Series for Happy Valley (nomination) – with Sally Wainwright, Neasa Hardiman, Juliet Charlesworth
- 2017: Royal Television Society, RTS Television Award, Best Single Drama for The Mark of Cain (nominated) – with Marc Munden, Lynn Horsford, Tony Marchant
- 2018: Royal Television Society, RTS Northern Ireland Award, Best Drama for Come Home
- 2019: Creative Diversity Network Award, Commissioning for Butterfly
- 2019: Royal Television Society, RTS North West Award, Best Single Drama or Drama Series for Years and Years
- 2019: BAFTA TV Award, Presented with a Special Award recognising her outstanding contribution to the television industry
- 2020: Broadcast Award, International Programme Sales for Years and Years

== Filmography ==
- 1993: Cracker (TV series) – script editor (7 episodes)
- 1995: Degrees of Error (TV series) – script editor
- 1996: Our Friends in the North (TV mini-series) – assistant producer (9 episodes)
- 1996: Prime Suspect 5: Errors of Judgement (TV mini-series) – assistant producer (2 episodes)
- 1996: Hillsborough (TV movie) – producer
- 1999: Heart – producer
- 1999: Love in the 21st Century (TV series) – creator, executive producer (6 episodes)
- 1999–2000: Queer as Folk (TV series) – producer (10 episodes); Executive Producer (10 episodes)
- 2001: Now You See Her (TV movie) – executive producer
- 2001: Bob & Rose (TV series) – executive producer (6 episodes)
- 2001–2002: Linda Green (TV series) – producer (6 episodes); Executive Producer (10 episodes)
- 2000–2002: Clocking Off (TV series) – executive producer (21 episodes)
- 2002: Sparkhouse (TV mini-series) – executive producer (3 episodes)
- 2002: Flesh and Blood (TV movie) – executive producer
- 2003: Burn It (TV series) – executive producer
- 2003: The Second Coming (TV mini-series) – executive producer (2 episodes)
- 2003: Indian Dream (TV movie) – executive producer
- 2004: Conviction (TV series) – executive producer (4 episodes)
- 2004: Mine All Mine (TV series) – executive producer (5 episodes)
- 2005: Dead Man Weds (TV series) – executive producer
- 2005: Big Dippers (TV movie) – executive producer
- 2005: Casanova (TV mini-series) – executive producer (3 episodes)
- 2005: Jane Hall (TV series) – executive producer
- 2006: Magnolia (TV movie) – executive producer
- 2006–2007: New Street Law (TV series) – executive producer (12 episodes)
- 2007: The Mark of Cain – executive producer
- 2009: Unforgiven (TV mini-series) – executive producer (3 episodes)
- 2010: Acid Burn (short) – executive producer
- 2010: A Passionate Woman (TV series) – executive producer (3 episodes)
- 2010: Worried About the Boy (TV movie) – executive producer
- 2010: Single Father (TV mini-series) – executive producer (4 episodes)
- 2011: Exile (TV mini-series) – executive producer (3 episodes)
- 2011–2012: Bedlam (TV series) – executive producer (12 episodes)
- 2011–2016: Scott & Bailey (TV series) – executive producer (30 episodes)
- 2012: Life Stories (TV mini-series) – executive producer (4 episodes)
- 2012: Love Life (TV series) – executive producer (3 episodes)
- 2012: The Syndicate (TV series) – executive producer (5 episodes)
- 2012: Hit & Miss (TV mini-series) – executive producer (6 episodes)
- 2012: Blackout (TV mini-series) – executive producer (3 episodes)
- 2012: Blood – producer
- 2012–2016: Last Tango in Halifax (TV series) – executive producer (20 episodes)
- 2013: Heading Out (TV series)– producer
- 2013: The Last Witch (TV movie) – executive producer
- 2014: The Driver (TV mini-series) – executive producer (3 episodes)
- 2014–2015: Prey (TV mini-series) – executive producer (2 episodes)
- 2014–2016: Happy Valley (TV series) – executive producer (12 episodes)
- 2015: Tofu (TV series documentary short) – executive producer (8 episodes)
- 2015: Cucumber (TV series) – executive producer (8 episodes)
- 2015: Banana (TV series) – executive producer (8 episodes)
- 2015: Danny and the Human Zoo (TV movie) – executive producer
- 2016: The Five (TV series) – executive producer (10 episodes)
- 2016: Paranoid (TV mini-series) – associate producer (1 episode); Executive Producer (7 episodes)
- 2016: Ordinary Lies (TV series) – executive producer (6 episodes)
- 2017: Trust Me (TV mini-series) – executive producer (4 episodes)
- 2018: Come Home (TV series) – executive producer (3 episodes)
- 2018: The Detail (TV series) – executive producer (10 episodes)
- 2018: Butterfly (TV mini-series) – executive producer (3 episodes)
- 2019: Years and Years (TV mini-series) – executive producer (6 episodes)
- 2019–2020: Traces (TV series) – executive producer (6 episodes)
- 2020: The Stranger (TV series) - executive producer (8 episodes)
- 2021: It's a Sin (TV series) – executive producer (5 episodes)
- 2021: Finding Alice (TV series) – executive producer (6 episodes)
- 2021: Ridley Road (TV series) – executive producer (4 episodes)
- 2021: No Return (TV mini-series) – executive producer
- 2021: Stay Close (TV mini-series) – executive producer
- 2022: Queer as Folk (TV series) - executive producer (8 episodes)
