= Cucumber (British TV series) =

2015 British television series

- Genre: Comedy drama
- Created by: Russell T Davies
- Written by: Russell T Davies
- Directed by: David Evans; Alice Troughton; Euros Lyn
- Starring: Vincent Franklin; Cyril Nri; Julie Hesmondhalgh; Freddie Fox; James Murray; Fisayo Akinade; Ceallach Spellman; Con O'Neill
- Composer: Murray Gold
- Country of origin: United Kingdom
- Original language: English
- No. of series: 1
- No. of episodes: 8

Production
- Executive producers: Russell T Davies; Nicola Shindler; Julie Gardner
- Producer: Matt Strevens
- Production locations: Manchester, Greater Manchester, England
- Running time: 45 minutes
- Production companies: Red Production Company; Adjacent Productions

Original release
- Network: Channel 4
- Release: 22 January – 12 March 2015

Related
- Banana; Tofu

Cucumber is a 2015 British comedy drama television series created by Russell T Davies and aired on Channel 4. Exploring 21st-century gay life, the series focuses on middle-aged Henry Best (Vincent Franklin). Following a disastrous date night with his boyfriend of nine years, Lance Sullivan (Cyril Nri), Henry's old life shatters. He embarks on a new life with unfamiliar rules.

In development since 2006, Cucumber was announced along with E4's companion series Banana, and 4oD's web series Tofu in November 2013. The titles of all three shows come from a scientific study into the male erection, which divided the erection into a hardness scale consisting of tofu, peeled banana, banana, and cucumber. Upon reading the study, Davies remarked that "right there and then, I knew I had my drama".

Cucumber ran for one series. Davies confirmed that Cucumber was a one and done story and would not return for a second series. The show was nominated for the GLAAD Media Award for Outstanding TV Movie or Limited Series.

== Cast ==
- Vincent Franklin as Henry Best
- Cyril Nri as Lance Sullivan
- Julie Hesmondhalgh as Cleo Whitaker
- Freddie Fox as Freddie Baxter
- James Murray as Daniel Coltrane
- Fisayo Akinade as Dean Monroe
- Ceallach Spellman as Adam Whitaker
- Con O'Neill as Cliff Costello
- Matthew James-Bailey as Tomasz
- Eleanor Worthington Cox as Molly Whitaker
- Darren Lawrence as Raymond
- Jamie Zubairi as Max
- Letitia Wright as Vivienne Scott
- Anjli Mohindra as Veronica Chandra
- Adjoa Andoh as Marie

== Production ==
Cucumber was created by Davies during his tenure as showrunner of Doctor Who. Envisioned as a spiritual sequel to the seminal 1999–2000 Channel 4 series Queer as Folk, More Gay Men, as it was then called, was to focus on middle-aged gay men. It developed from the question, "why are so many gay men glad when we split up?" that his friend Carl Austin had asked him in 2001. The show was initially due to enter production in 2006, but the success of the revival of Doctor Who indefinitely delayed the series. By March 2007, Davies had fleshed out the initial episode.

He explained a pivotal scene in correspondence with journalist Benjamin Cook:

I can imagine a man who is so enraged by something tiny—the fact that his boyfriend won't learn to swim—that he goes into a rage so great that, in one night, his entire life falls apart. It's not about the learning to swim at all, of course, it's about the way that your mind can fix on something small and use it as a gateway to a whole world of anger and pain… If I write the Learn To Swim scene well—and it could be the spine of the whole drama—then I will be saying something about gay men, about couples, about communications, about anger."

— Russell T Davies to Benjamin Cook, 6 March 2007, The Writer's Tale: The Final Chapter

By 2008, Davies had moved to Los Angeles, California. More Gay Men was among the list of series that Davies wanted to produce, along with an American adaptation of Bob & Rose. Cucumber had been picked up by the American cable network Showtime and BBC Worldwide and entered into pre-production in July 2011. Pre-production was suspended a month later after Davies's boyfriend Andrew Smith was diagnosed with a brain tumour. The couple returned to Manchester so Smith could undergo chemotherapy nearer to their families.

Cucumber was later picked up by Channel 4 to be produced by Davies' former colleague Nicola Shindler and the Red Production Company. The show was Davies' first Channel 4 series in over a decade; Davies had an acrimonious dispute with the channel after a decision to green light production on a Queer as Folk spinoff and The Second Coming was reversed by new executive personnel. Former Doctor Who producer Piers Wenger convinced Davies to return to the channel due to the political nature of the show, which had by then been developed conceptually to include sister shows Banana and Tofu. The three series refer to a urological scale of erection hardness, which consists of tofu, peeled banana, banana, and cucumber, which is alluded to in the show's opening narration.

== Episodes ==
No.	Title	Directed by	Written by	Original release date	UK viewers (millions)
1	Episode 1	David Evans	Russell T Davies	22 January 2015	1.57
Henry Best (Vincent Franklin) is a gay middle-aged insurance salesman, happily settled with his boyfriend of nine years, Lance Sullivan (Cyril Nri), but increasingly distracted by his colleagues Dean Monroe (Fisayo Akinade) and Freddie Baxter (Freddie Fox). Lance asks Henry on a date, but after Henry rejects Lance's marriage proposal, Lance seeks revenge by bringing a younger man, Francesco (Peter Caulfield), back for a threesome. Lance insists on sleeping with Francesco, angry that Henry has not had anal sex with him since they started dating. Henry phones the police and has Lance and Francesco arrested. Distraught, he flees and moves into Dean and Freddie's apartment.
2	Episode 2	David Evans	Russell T Davies	29 January 2015	1.03
Henry begins his new life without Lance after moving into Dean and Freddie's apartment. Meanwhile, Lance goes to a bar with his overtly heterosexual colleague Daniel Coltrane (James Murray), to whom he confides his lack of decent sex life with Henry. Henry gets suspended from work after supposedly causing the suicide of one of his colleagues. He is annoyed that Freddie, who set his boundaries with Henry, has no problem entertaining his friend Cliff (Con O'Neill). Henry's sister Cleo Whitaker (Julie Hesmondhalgh) tracks down Lance, allowing him and Henry to meet up, where several revelations are surfaced.
3	Episode 3	David Evans	Russell T Davies	5 February 2015	0.88
Cleo is introduced to Dean and Freddie after Henry invites her and her son Adam (Ceallach Spellman) to visit. Cleo encourages Henry to move out. Henry discovers that Lance has taken the money out of their joint bank account and enlists Adam and one of his friends to star in homoerotic videos to try to make some money. Meanwhile, Freddie runs into his former teacher and lover Gregory (Edward MacLiam), who is now married; Gregory tries to convince Freddie to have one last sexual rendezvous. After Freddie bails on him, Gregory texts him to meet for sex at his apartment. They have a fight after Freddie takes a picture of a half-dressed Gregory without his consent, as revenge for the abusive dynamic of their relationship. Henry helps Freddie out in the fight just as Lance shows up with a present for him after his attempts to get Daniel in bed fail.
4	Episode 4	Alice Troughton	Russell T Davies	12 February 2015	0.87
Henry, Lance, Cleo and Freddie all go on dates; Henry with eccentric Rupert (Rufus Hound), Lance with Peter, who shares the same desire for Daniel; Cleo with married former flame Brian (Ardal O'Hanlon); and Freddie with Anna (Haruka Abe), the sister of a former boyfriend. Later that night, not everyone is satisfied at sex. Cleo and Brian have a heart-to-heart after their awkward sexual experience, Freddie and Anna eventually hit it off, and Henry's sexual timidity sends off Rupert. Henry later is attracted to Rupert's friend, Leigh (Phaldut Sharma). After Lance backs out of sex with Peter, Daniel invites Lance to his flat, where Daniel again flirts outrageously with him while claiming to be straight. Meanwhile, Dean goes through some strange role play when he is "kidnapped" by two men and treated like a sex slave.
5	Episode 5	Alice Troughton	Russell T Davies	19 February 2015	0.35 (overnight) (outside top 30 for official rating)
After Henry is unable to regain the money that Lance has taken from their joint account, he generates income from the homoerotic videos starring his nephew Adam and friends. Cleo eventually finds out and puts her foot down after a game called 'Nervous' goes too far. Henry also runs afoul of Freddie's suspicious parents after they find out that he is living in the same apartment as their son. Freddie and Henry have a deep conversation together. Henry decides to spend the evening with Freddie, who wants to talk about Leigh. Meanwhile, Lance is confused at Daniel's domineering sexual attitudes and behaviour towards him. Eventually, Daniel masturbates in front of Lance, and suggests doing something like that again. Henry and Lance finally agree on neutral ground, with Lance proposing to buy out Henry's share of the house. They eventually talk and recall happier times.
6	Episode 6	Alice Troughton	Russell T Davies	26 February 2015	0.89
The episode follows Lance's life from his birth to the present. His family initially rejects his homosexuality, before accepting him shortly after his boyfriend dies of AIDS. He moves to Manchester and eventually meets Henry and moves in with him. Back in the present, Henry visits their house to declare his love to Lance, who rejects him. That same night, he goes on a date with Daniel, who invites him back to his place, where Lance ends up performing oral sex on him. After climaxing, Daniel reacts violently and murders Lance.
7	Episode 7	Euros Lyn	Russell T Davies	5 March 2015	0.92
Henry, deeply distraught, goes to the Lance's funeral, organized by Lance's sister Marie (Adjoa Andoh). Marie blames Henry for Lance's death and refuses to give back the money Lance had taken out of their joint account. Henry gets closer to Freddie and Dean, and the three try to find him a date. They have a heart-to-heart, and Henry admits to them that he has never had anal sex. Roderick evicts all of the residents of the block of flats where Freddie, Dean, and Henry are living. Henry returns to his old home and invites most of the people seen in the series to come live with him, nicknaming them the "LGBT+ Collective".
8	Episode 8	Euros Lyn	Russell T Davies	12 March 2015	0.58 (overnight) (outside top 30 for official rating)
Henry offers to let the "LGBT collective" live in his house free of charge as long as they need. Cliff and Freddie help him to get his job back by accusing his former company of being homophobic. After the initial few weeks, everyone begins to move out. Freddie is the last one living with Henry and lashes out at him, accusing him of trying to replace Lance with him, before running out of the house. Henry later learns that Freddie has quit his job and left the city. Daniel is found guilty and sentenced to prison. Six years later, Henry runs into Freddie and they catch up in a coffee shop. Freddie explains that he has been travelling and Henry talks about his love life. He concludes the series by saying that he believes he still needs to take the time to think and finally fully accept himself as a gay man.

== Reception ==
Writing in The Guardian, Sam Wollaston argued that the debut of the Cucumber/Banana/Tofu trilogy was the "television event of the week". He said that despite the show being "gloriously, triumphantly, explicitly gay", he "never once felt left out" as a heterosexual viewer. Mark Lawson said that the show had a wider theme: "the broader genre of respectability meltdown, as Henry is accelerated from smug dullness to scenes featuring police intervention, furious colleagues and social humiliation".

Both Lawson and Theo Merz (writing in the Daily Telegraph) compare the Cucumber trilogy to Davies' Queer as Folk—Lawson argues that while Cucumber and Banana are "notably sexually graphic", the times have changed: "Queer as Folk was made at a time when campaigners were fighting to reduce the age of gay sexual consent from 18 to 16, while Davies' latest shows are screening in an era when men and women can legally marry each other", and therefore the depictions of explicit sexual themes are less likely to offend. Merz agrees, stating that Cucumber and Banana "feel less dangerous, and so less exciting than the earlier Queer as Folk"; Merz also argues that Cucumber has wider latitude to represent more varied gay characters as it is not carrying the burden of being the only show on television representing gay life.

Writing in the Telegraph, Gerard O'Donovan argued that the first episode succeeded ("In terms of comedy it worked brilliantly, the brio and louche wit of Davies' writing bringing a rare energy and grit to the unfolding chaos"). But Michael Hogan, also writing in the Telegraph, said that after watching the third episode, he was "disappointed" and could not find much warmth in the protagonist, Henry.

The series was also positively reviewed in The Independent, where Ellen E. Jones stated: "In Davies' hands, the tragi-comedy of middle-aged desperation is so sad, but so, very, very funny". Jones also argued that the appeal of the show was "universal" rather than just limited to a gay audience.

== International broadcasts ==
Both Cucumber and Banana premiered in the United States on Logo on 13 April 2015 and were watched by 55,000 viewers. Both series aired in Australia on SBS Television. In Canada, Cucumber and Banana were broadcast on OutTV in spring 2015. The series aired in Germany as a dubbed version with the first episode on WDR on 30 July 2016, which was watched by 70,000 viewers.
