= European Association of Urology =

Non-profit organisation

The European Association of Urology (EAU) is a non-profit organisation committed to the representation of urology professionals worldwide. All active urology professionals, including urology nurses, are eligible for membership of the EAU.

The constituent bodies of the EAU include the:

- Executive Committee (3 members elected by the General Assembly)
- Executive Board (the Executive Committee and the chairs of the EAU Offices)
- EAU Offices.

Decisions made by the EAU General Assembly are implemented by the EAU Offices. The Executive Committee and EAU Offices are assisted by the EAU Central Office, which is based in Arnhem, The Netherlands, and run by the Executive Management. The European Academy of Urology is the advisory body to and of the EAU. The Academy consists of members who have previously had official responsibilities within the EAU.

The EAU maintains close contacts with national urology organisations who represent the interests of urologists at a national level worldwide. These independent national organisations are crucial as they support the EAU and its European activities, for example the Annual EAU Congress and 'Urology Week', which is organised annually to raise awareness of urological conditions throughout Europe, within the healthcare professions and the general public.

Urology associations in the Asia-Pacific, Latin America, the Middle East regions welcome opportunities for bilateral exchanges with EAU members with regard to training, education and other areas in urology. Ultimately, this exchange will benefit the entire specialty. During the Annual EAU Congress, a specific day has been allocated to 'Urology Beyond Europe' (see www.uroweb.org), the sessions held during this day will reinforce collaboration between the EAU and other urology societies worldwide.

Other ongoing collaborative projects involving the EAU include the European Multidisciplinary Meeting on Urological Cancers (EMUC), which is organised in association with the European Society for Medical Oncology (ESMO) and the European Society for Therapeutic Radiology and Oncology (ESTRO). EMUC brings together world experts in the field of urological oncology, thus providing the opportunity to increase our knowledge and improve our approach to a wide range of topics, including biology, prevention, diagnosis, therapy and quality of life. An additional example of EAU collaboration with another organisation for the benefit of urology is the World Health Organization (WHO) Consensus Conference on bladder cancer, which was held in April 2008.

The European Association of Urology Nurses (EAUN) aims to contribute to the development of higher standards of urology nursing in Europe. EAUN members receive a series of free publications and benefit from additional privileges, such as the fellowship programme.

== Annual congress ==
The EAU organises congresses and courses in the field of urology. The Annual EAU Congress is the largest urology meeting in the world; in 2008, over 12,000 delegates visited the congress in Milan, Italy.

== Regional meetings ==
The Board of the EAU has identified the need for an additional series of EU-ACME (European Urology - Accredited Continuing Medical Education) meetings on a regional, but supranational, basis. These meetings provide platforms from which new clinical or experimental work from the region can be presented to an international audience. To complement the international perspective, speakers from outside the region are invited to give lectures on current topics. Recent Regional EAU Meetings have included the 2nd North-Eastern European Meeting and the 8th Central European Meeting.

== Section Office ==
The EAU Section Office aims to develop specialist sections covering all sub- and super-specialist fields of urology. The participating sections promote and develop scientific and clinical programmes and organise regular meetings to disseminate information about these super-specialist activities and research.

Every year EAU grants awards to recognize the research in Urology. They are handed out at the Annual Congress and the winner is recognized in the EAU Award Gallery and the Congress Newspaper.

== EU-ACME Committee ==
In 2004, the EAU and the European Board of Urology (EBU) – the working group of European Union of Medical Specialists (UEMS) Section of Urology – joined forces to establish a new committee: the EU-ACME to promote Continuing Medical Education (CME) and Continuing Professional Development (CPD) for all European urologists. The EBU, an independent organisation, is responsible for all regulatory matters; the involvement of EAU makes a truly European-wide system possible.

European urologists can gain CME credit points by participating in accredited activities (e.g. by attending meetings or reading scientific publications and answering questions online). These activities are designed to provide information that is both relevant and essential to medical practice. We expect that national CME systems will become obligatory in Europe in the near future.

All EAU events and annual meetings of the national urology societies are automatically accredited.

== EAU Awards ==
Every year EAU grants awards to recognize the research in Urology. They are handed out at the Annual Congress and the winner is recognized in the EAU Award Gallery and the Congress Newspaper.

== European Urological Scholarship Programme (EUSP) ==
Knowledge shared is knowledge multiplied. The highest standards of urological care can be proliferated by sharing knowledge. The EUSP stimulates clinical and scientific research across Europe and encourages exchange of expertise and knowledge between European urologists.

The EUSP offers the following programmes: • scholarship: maximum of 1 year of basic, clinical or experimental research • clinical fellowship: 6 weeks to 3 months • short-term visit: maximum of 3 weeks • visiting professorship : 4 days.

== Research Foundation ==
To improve and sustain the highest quality of urological research in Europe, the EAU has recently set up the EAU Research Foundation (EAU-RF), an independent body governed by the EAU. The remit of the EAU-RF is to stimulate and coordinate basic, translational and clinical research by qualified ICH GCP investigators.

The EAU-RF will: - instigate the formation of networks by establishing a scientific communication infrastructure between the EAU-RF and high-profile clinical study centres, their satellites and basic science laboratories - initiate and organise multicentre and multinational clinical studies and basic science projects - initiate, fund and conduct investigator-initiated trials - identify and offer opportunities for research scholarships - communicate these activities to European urologists and to public and private sources of funding.

The EAU-RF has created a governance structure designed to achieve its targets most efficiently. The PR and Fundraising Committee, the Clinical Research Committee, the Basic Research Committee and the Scholarship Committee have been set up, and are complemented by the comprehensive trial support offered at every stage by the EAU Central Research Office - CuraTrial.

== History Office ==
The EAU History Office keeps records of old techniques, instruments, major events and significant figures in European urology, to promote interest in the history of urology. The series 'Historia Urologiae Europaeae', (which forms part of the European Classical Library) contains accounts of European urological history. The 'European Classical Library in Urology' and 'The Art Collection' including 'From Ornamentation to Mutilation', are very popular and can be ordered from the EAU web site.

== Publications ==
The EAU produces several publications that help to disseminate the latest news from the Association.

European Urology, the official scientific journal of the EAU, publishes peer-reviewed original articles and topical reviews on a wide range of urological issues. It is available in print and online and reaches over 20,000 readers.

European Urology Today (EUT), the official newsletter of the EAU, reports news from the association and its committees as well as announcements regarding upcoming meetings and congress reports. All members are encouraged to contribute articles to the EUT discussing recent studies, technical developments, fellowship experiences, and other issues of interest to EAU members. EUT is published six times a year in newspaper format and is distributed to approximately 13,000 addresses worldwide.

European Urology Video Journal (EUVJ) is produced by the EAU Video Committee on a quarterly basis. Each issue includes a DVD containing 45 minutes of footage showing surgical techniques.

== Website ==
The EAU has its own website. Details of the Annual EAU Congress, including information about the venue, scientific programme and social events, are available. In addition, the scientific programmes of all the main urology meetings, the EAU guidelines, original EAU articles (including a 'chat' function), a virtual school, webinars and online discussions are on the EAU website.

EAU Education Office and the European School of Urology (ESU) The ESU is part of the Education Office of the EAU. Its aim is to provide every practicing urologist and urologist-in-training in Europe with a comprehensive and up-to-date overview of all contemporary issues and most recent progress within urology.

Each year, post-graduate ESU training courses, covering both general and advanced clinical and research topics, are scheduled during the Annual EAU Congress. In addition, hands-on training courses are offered in collaboration with the European Society of Urological Technology (ESUT), one of the EAU offices.

The ESU also organises and funds ESU Organised Courses. Course programmes are customised to meet the needs of local organisers and can vary in duration from 2 hours to up to 2 days. The ESU has started to arrange courses at all major national congresses.

Another initiative from the ESU involves standalone events covering recent developments, for example the annual European Urology Forum in Switzerland.

Masterclasses discussing the newest topics and latest developments in all fields of urology are held regularly. Recent masterclasses have included 'medical treatment for urological cancer' and 'female and functional urology'.

The ESU has also started to build the Virtual European School of Urology. Using this new educational tool, both residents and urologists will be able to access on-line CME accredited training. All ESU activities are EU-ACME accredited.

== Residents ==
The ESU organises the European Residents Education Programme (EUREP) course, an educational activity designed for European senior urology residents, in collaboration with the EBU. The course offers a series of teaching modules, after which an EBU examination can be taken. The EAU supports residents in terms of registration, travel and accommodation.

Political commitment The European Commission strives to improve public health in the European Union, to prevent human illness and diseases, and to obviate sources of danger to human health. To achieve a high level of health protection, close cooperation with the scientific experts is vital.

The WHO is the directing and coordinating authority for health within the United Nations system. The WHO is responsible for providing leadership on global health matters, and the EAU therefore strives to be a partner with regard to urological health issues, such as prostate and bladder cancer.

== Erection Hardness Score ==
The EHS scale developed by the association came to public note when used as the theme of the TV series Cucumber, Banana and Tofu, all by Russell T Davies. The names are used as descriptions in the associations five-part Rating scale.

== Co-operation ==
There are over 10 other European urology-related boards and societies to which the EAU maintains partner relations. Of these, the European Board of Urology deals with evaluation tools, educational standards and regulátory matters. This non-profit organisation sits in Arnheim, Netherlands, as well. There is an effort to standardise urological training in Europe. The highest rank for the trainee is the FEBU diploma (Fellow of the European Board of Urology) which should mark an excellence and extended qualification of the urologist, though with no legal impact for the holder.
