= Fisayo Akinade =

British actor (born 1987)

- Born: 28 December 1987 (age 38); Liverpool, England
- Education: Royal Central School of Speech and Drama
- Occupation: Actor
- Years active: 2011–present

Fisayo Akinade (/fɪˈsaɪoʊ ˌækiˈædeɪ/) is an English actor, best known for his roles as Dean Monroe in Cucumber and Banana on Channel 4 and Mr. Ajayi in the Netflix series Heartstopper. Akinade has also done work in theatre, notably portraying Reverend Hale in The Crucible at the National Theatre and Gielgud Theatre in London.

== Early life and education ==
Akinade was born in Liverpool. He spent four years of his childhood in Nigeria before returning to the UK where he grew up in the Fallowfield and Moss Side areas of Manchester.

He wanted to be a gymnast growing up. However, after suffering injury, and the closure of the place where he practiced, Akinade began attending drop-in drama classes at the Contact Theatre, later joining the Contact Young Actors Company, and workshops at the Royal Exchange Theatre. He went on to train at the Royal Central School of Speech and Drama in London.

== Career ==
Akinade has performed in a number of productions on both stage and screen. On stage, he played Flute in A Midsummer Night’s Dream, Eros in Antony and Cleopatra. and several National Theatre productions.

His television breakthrough came in 2015, when he starred as Dean Monroe in Russell T Davies' drama Cucumber and its offshoots Banana and Tofu. In 2016, Akinade starred alongside Glenn Close, Gemma Arterton, and Paddy Considine in The Girl with All the Gifts.

He appeared in the 2019 feature film The Personal History of David Copperfield.

In 2020 he appeared in the National Theatre musical production, Barber Shop Chronicles, written by Inua Ellams. The show was presented live on stage and streamed on YouTube during the COVID-19 pandemic in the UK.

In 2021 he played Mercutio in the National Theatre production of Romeo and Juliet, made for television. It premiered on 4 April 2021 on Sky Arts in the UK.

In February 2022, Akinade starred in Alistair McDowall's play The Glow. The play was performed at Royal Court Theatre Downstairs. Akinade featured in the Netflix series Heartstopper, released in April 2022, in which he plays schoolteacher and Charlie Spring's mentor, Nathan Ajayi. In November 2022, Akinade starred as Chevalier de Saint-Jacques in Starz drama Dangerous Liaisons, alongside Alice Englert, Nicholas Denton and Lesley Manville. Dangerous Liaisons was picked up for a second series.

In December 2025, Akinade appeared as Nurse Angel in Kate Winslet's directorial-debut film Goodbye June; the film aired on Netflix.

Akinade was nominated for an Ian Charleson Award for young British actors in 2014 for his role as Silvius and William in the UK tour production of As You Like It. He went on to win third prize of the same award in 2016 for his role as The Dauphin in the Donmar Warehouse production of Saint Joan, losing out to Paapa Essiedu and Jessica Brown Findlay for the first and second prizes, respectively. In 2025, Akinade became one of the judges of the Ian Charleson Award.

== Personal life ==
Akinade is openly gay. He cites Heartstopper as the kind of programme which would have helped him to come out of the closet much sooner. He also said the show has helped him become more joyful, bold, and brave about his own queerness.

== Filmography ==
=== Film ===
Year	Title	Role	Notes
2013	Lifesaver	Ben	Short film
2016	The Works	Iago	Short film
2016	The Girl with All the Gifts	Private Kieran Gallagher	
2018	The Isle	Cailean Ferris	
2019	The Personal History of David Copperfield	Markham	
2025	Goodbye June	Nurse Angel	
2026	Heartstopper Forever	Nathan Ajayi	

=== Television ===
Year	Title	Role	Notes
2013	Fresh Meat	Vlad Supporter 1	Series 3 Episode 8
2015	Cucumber	Dean Monroe	7 episodes
2015	Banana	Dean Monroe	6 episodes
2015	Ordinary Lies	Ziggy	5 episodes
2015	The Vote	Jonathan Clarke	Television film
2016	A Midsummer Night's Dream	Flute	Television film
2017	In the Dark	Theo	Miniseries
2018	A Very English Scandal	Clive Otunde	Series 1 Episode 3
2019	Silent Witness	Andrew Dewey	Episodes: "To Brighton, To Brighton" (Parts 1&2)
2019	Martin's Close	William	Television film
2021	Romeo & Juliet	Mercutio	Television film produced by National Theatre at Home
2021	The Complaints Department	Narrator	2 episodes
2022	Atlanta	Khalil	Episode: White Fashion
2022–2024	Heartstopper	Nathan Ajayi	14 episodes
2022	Dangerous Liaisons	Chevalier de Saint-Jacques	8 episodes
2025	Foundation	Eely Karvis	3 episodes

=== Stage ===
Year	Title	Role	Venue	Notes and references
2013	Refugee Boy	Alem	West Yorkshire Playhouse	
2013	As You Like It	Adam/Silvius/William	Multiple venues on UK tour	Nominated for an Ian Charleson Award
2015	The Vote	Jonathan Clarke	Donmar Warehouse	
2015	Barbarians	Company	Young Vic	UK revival of the trilogy of plays originally written by Barrie Keeffe in 1977
2016	The Tempest	Caliban	Sam Wanamaker Playhouse	
2016	Three Migrants	John	Royal Court Theatre, London	Written by Fausto Paravidino
2016	Pigs and Dogs	Company	Royal Court Theatre, London	Written by Caryl Churchill
2016	Saint Joan	The Dauphin	Donmar Warehouse	Third Prize in the Ian Charleson Award
2018	The Way of the World	Witwoud	Donmar Warehouse	
2018	Antony and Cleopatra	Eros	National Theatre	
2019	The Antipodes	Adam	Dorfman Theatre	
2022	The Glow	Mason/Evan	Royal Court Theatre	Written by Alistair McDowall
2022	The Crucible	Reverend Hale	Olivier Theatre	
2023	The Crucible	Reverend Hale	Gielgud Theatre	West End transfer of the National Theatre production.
2024	Slave Play	Gary	Noël Coward Theatre	Written by Jeremy O. Harris
2026	As You Like It	Celia	Royal Shakespeare Company	RSC debut

=== Web ===
Year	Title	Role	Notes
2015	Tofu	Self	Web series; 5 episodes

=== Video games ===
Year	Title	Role	Notes
2019	Blood & Truth		

== Awards and nominations ==
Year	Award	Category	Work	Result	Ref.
2014	Ian Charleson Awards		As You Like It	Nominated	
2016	Ian Charleson Awards		Saint Joan	Third Prize	
