= Blackout (British TV series) =

British television drama series

- Blackout title card
- Genre: Drama
- Written by: Bill Gallagher
- Directed by: Tom Green
- Starring: Christopher Eccleston; Dervla Kirwan; Ewen Bremner
- Composer: David Julyan
- Country of origin: United Kingdom
- Original language: English
- No. of series: 1
- No. of episodes: 3

Production
- Executive producers: Christopher Aird; Nicola Shindler
- Producer: Matthew Bird
- Cinematography: Christopher Ross
- Editors: Liana Del Giudice; Anthony Combes
- Running time: 60 minutes
- Production company: Red Production Company

Original release
- Network: BBC One
- Release: 2 July – 16 July 2012

Blackout is a 2012 three-part British drama television series produced by Red Production Company. A corrupt council official wakes from an alcoholic blackout to realise that he may have been responsible for a murder. He soon begins a dramatic quest for redemption. The series is directed by Tom Green and written by Bill Gallagher.

== Plot ==
After an alcoholic binge corrupt council official Daniel Demoys (Christopher Eccleston) awakes from a blackout and circumstances lead him to believe he may be responsible for a murder. While trying to establish the events of the blackout he attempts to redeem himself, to such a degree that he finds himself a mayoral candidate with the public's backing. However, Daniel also begins a relationship with Detective Dalien Bevan's ex-wife, while the Detective is investigating the murder.

== Cast ==
- Christopher Eccleston as Daniel Demoys
- Dervla Kirwan as Alex Demoys
- Ewen Bremner as Jerry Durrans
- Karl Collins as Bo
- Andrew Scott as Dalien Bevan
- MyAnna Buring as Sylvie Mills
- Branka Katić as Donna Harris
- David Hayman as Henry Pulis
- Rebecca Callard as Ruth Pulis
- Wunmi Mosaku as Millie Coswell
- Lyndsey Marshal as Lucy Demoys
- Danny Sapani as D.I. Griffin
- Stuart McQuarrie as Eddie Dayton
- Danny Kelly as Billy Sutton
- Oliver Woollford as Luke Demoys
- Lorenzo Rodriguez as Charlie Demoys
- Olivia Cooke as Meg Demoys
- Osy Ikhile as Nelson Venner

== Production ==
Blackout was commissioned for BBC One by Ben Stephenson, (Drama Commissioning), and Danny Cohen, (Controller, BBC One). The producer is Matthew Bird and director is Tom Green. Executive Producers are Christopher Aird for BBC, Nicola Shindler for Red Production Company, and written by Bill Gallagher. The programme was mostly filmed in Manchester, and includes scenes which were filmed in Manchester Town Hall and Manchester Civil Justice Centre.

== Reception ==
The mini-series launched on BBC One on 2 July 2012. It attracted 4.47m viewers (19.6% of UK terrestrial viewers) in the 9pm time slot.

Writing for The Telegraph, Ben Lawrence commended the performances, including those of Eccleston and Scott, but said: "I didn't love Blackout; perhaps because it was so in love with itself. I was crying out for a bit of idiosyncratic dialogue, or some geographical reference to take me out of its noirish hinterland." Jasper Rees writing for The Arts Desk referenced Danish drama The Killing in his review, as did Arifa Akbar in The Independent, who said: "You can see how Blackout's creators have put flecks of Macbeth, and even The Killing in the mix, with its blend of political drama, morality play and crime thriller, but none of it works."
