= Having It Off =

- Genre: Sitcom
- Starring: Antony Cotton
- Country of origin: United Kingdom
- Original language: English
- No. of series: 1
- No. of episodes: 6

Production
- Running time: 30 minutes
- Production company: Red Production Company

Original release
- Network: BBC Choice
- Release: 2002

Having it Off is a television comedy series for BBC Choice made by Red Production Company in 2002.

It was set at a cheap hairdressing salon in Eccles, Greater Manchester. It was shown only once and is not available yet on DVD.

Out gay bitchy stereotype Guy La Trousse (played by Antony Cotton, Coronation Street, Queer As Folk), desperately tries to escape the drudge of daily wash and crop and change the fortunes of the salon – and his career.

This is all thwarted by April, nymphomaniac loud-mouthed wife of the hairdressers owner.

The BBC website describes it as "rude, crude, strongly working-class sitcom on the lesser-seen BBC Choice, Having It Off promised much yet fell curiously short of the mark, lacking the key that would have propelled it to a higher level".
