= Vincent Franklin =

British actor (born 1966)

- Born: Vincent Warren Franklin; 3 November 1966 (age 59); Haworth, West Riding of Yorkshire, England
- Education: Bristol Old Vic Theatre School
- Occupation: Actor
- Years active: 1995–present
- Spouse: Hilary Greatorex

Vincent Warren Franklin (born 3 November 1966) is an English actor from Haworth. He is best known for his roles in comedy television programmes. He has appeared in a number of feature films including the Mike Leigh films Topsy-Turvy (1999), Vera Drake (2004) and Mr Turner (2014), and the 2006 films Confetti and The Illusionist, as well as The Bourne Identity (2002). In 2018, he played the role of Mike Travis in the BBC television series Bodyguard.

== Early life ==
Franklin was born in Haworth and was raised there until the age of nine when his family moved to Kilnsea, East Riding of Yorkshire. A couple of years later they moved back to Bradford when Franklin was 11. Franklin was educated at Bradford Grammar School. Franklin studied from 1988 to 1990 at the Bristol Old Vic Theatre School.

== Career ==
Franklin has had roles in many TV series including Five Days, Doc Martin, Being Human, Grandma's House, Happy Valley as DSI Andy Shepherd, as Rowan the trainer in The Office, Nick Jowett in Twenty Twelve, PR guru Stewart Pearson in The Thick Of It, Henry Best in Cucumber and Banana as well as Prendergast in the BBC 2017 adaptation of the Evelyn Waugh novel Decline and Fall. He portrayed Christopher Drawlight in the 2015 BBC production of Jonathan Strange and Mr. Norrell.

He is also a founder of the communications consultancy, Quietroom.

== Personal life ==
Franklin is married to actress Hilary Greatorex and they have two children. He is a Bradford City A.F.C. fan.

== Filmography ==
=== Film ===
Year	Title	Role	Notes
1997	The Woodlanders	Stable Lad	
1999	Topsy-Turvy	Rutland Barrington	
2001	From Hell	George Lusk	
2002	The Bourne Identity	Rawlins	
2004	Vera Drake	Mr Lewis	
2006	The Illusionist	Loschek	
2006	Confetti	Archie	
2006	Jam	Jason	
2009	Bright Star	Dr Bree	
2013	National Theatre Live: This House	Michael Cocks	
2014	Mr Turner	Gentleman Critics	
2014	The Riot Club	Porter	
2018	Peterloo	Magistrate Rev Ethelston	
2018	Nativity Rocks!	Lord Mayor	
2019	Yesterday	Brian	
2021	Censor	Fraser	

=== Television ===
Year	Title	Role	Notes
1995–2007	The Bill	Merv Patterson / Hotel Manager	2 episodes
1996	Sharman	Barman	Season 1, Episode 3
1998	Kavanagh QC	Alan Sheedy	Episode: "Dead Reckoning"
1998	Berkeley Square	Reverend Wilkes	Episode: "Pretty Maids All in a Row"
1998	Alexei Sayle's Merry-Go-Round	Various	Season 1, Episode 6
2000–2004	Casualty	Ken Driscoll/Tony Fleming	2 episodes
2001	People Like Us		Episode: "The Mother"
2001	The Office	Rowan	Episode: "Training"
2001	The Infinite Worlds of H.G. Wells	War Minister	6 episodes
2002–2003	Sir Gadabout: The Worst Knight in the Land	Sir Rancid	20 episodes
2004	Wild West	Priggish Man	Episode: "Angela Learns to Drive"
2004	The Worst Week of My Life	Doctor	Episode: "Friday"
2004	EastEnders	Carl	1 episode
2004–2017	Doc Martin	Chris Parsons	5 episodes
2005	Casanova	Nobleman 2	Season 1, Episode 1
2005	Hustle	Nigel Henney	Episode: "Gold Mine"
2006	The Virgin Queen	Thomas Phelippes	Season 1, Episode 2
2006	Holby City	Kevin Gilbert	Episode: "Let It Shine"
2007	Five Days	Rawdon Hull	4 episodes
2007	Doctors	Pete Thorne	Episode: "Out of Control"
2007	The Life and Times of Vivienne Vyle	Graham	Season 1, Episode 3
2007	Lead Balloon	Barry	Episode: "Debacle"
2007	Oliver Twist	Mr Limbkins	2 episodes
2007–2012	The Thick of It	Stewart Pearson	10 episodes
2008	Never Better	Josh	Episode: "God"
2008	Fairy Tales	Ralf	Episode: "The Empress's New Clothes"
2010	Being Human	Ross	Episode: "Educating Creature"
2011–2012	Twenty Twelve	Nick Jowett	12 episodes
2012	Grandma's House	Uncle Barry	2 episodes
2013	The Wrong Mans	Sergeant Ince	Episode: "The Wrong Mans"
2015	Banana	Henry Best	4 episodes
2015	Cucumber	Henry Best	8 episodes
2015	Jonathan Strange & Mr Norrell	Drawlight	7 episodes
2016–2023	Happy Valley	Andy Shepherd	12 episodes
2016	BBC Comedy Feeds	Marshall	Episode: "Fail"
2017	Urban Myths	Alexander	Episode: "Hitler the Artist"
2017	Decline and Fall	Prendergast	3 episodes
2018	Bodyguard	Mike Travis	6 episodes
2019	Gentleman Jack	Christopher Rawson	5 episodes
2021	Midsomer Murders	Artie Blythe	Episode: "With Baited Breath"
2022	The Witchfinder	Topcliffe	2 episodes
2025	The War Between the Land and the Sea	Prime Minister Harry Shaw	
2026	Beyond Paradise	James Smith	Recurring role, Series 4, 4 Episodes

== Stage credits ==
Year	Title	Role	Notes
2022	The Snail House by Richard Eyre	Neil Marriot	Hampstead Theatre, London
