= Benjamin Cook (journalist) =

English journalist and filmmaker (born 1982)

- Cook in 2011
- Born: 17 October 1982 (age 43); Isleworth, London, England; United Kingdom
- Occupation: Journalist
- Known for: Radio Times; Doctor Who Magazine; Doctor Who: The Writer's Tale Tale Foundry; Becoming YouTube

Benjamin Cook (born 17 October 1982) is a British writer, journalist, video editor, and YouTuber. He is best known for his work in connection with Doctor Who, including for Doctor Who Magazine and as the author of Doctor Who: The New Audio Adventures – The Inside Story and co-author of Doctor Who: The Writer's Tale. He has also directed a short film, The Imp of the Perverse, and created the documentary series Becoming YouTube.

== Career ==
At the age of 13, in 1996, Cook won a competition run by BBC children's news programme Newsround. He first wrote for Doctor Who Magazine (DWM) in March 1999 and his catalogue of interviews for the publication includes Tom Baker, David Tennant, Billie Piper, Bernard Cribbins, Kylie Minogue, Richard E Grant, Timothy Dalton, and the first ever major print interview with Matt Smith. He compiled six DWM Special Editions – published between 2005 and 2010, under the umbrella title In Their Own Words – providing a chronological commentary on the making of the TV series, from 1963 to 2009, by those involved in its production, collated from extracts of interviews previously published in DWM. He also contributed to the 2006 Doctor Who Annual and the 2011 and 2012 editions of The Brilliant Book of Doctor Who. His 2002 interview with the elusive Doctor Who scriptwriter Christopher Bailey inspired Robert Shearman to write Deadline, an acclaimed audio play starring Derek Jacobi.

Cook began writing for the Radio Times in 2008. His book Doctor Who: The Writer's Tale, based on an in-depth email correspondence between Cook and Doctor Who executive producer Russell T Davies during the production of the show's fourth series in 2007 and 2008, was published by BBC Books in 2008 to enthusiastic reviews and selection for the Richard & Judy Book Club. A revised, updated and expanded edition, The Writer's Tale: The Final Chapter was published in 2010 to similar acclaim, although Private Eye criticised the book as "breathlessly self-congratulatory".

== YouTube and other work ==
Cook created Becoming YouTube, a 12-part documentary series incorporating sketch comedy and fantasy sequences featuring popular stars of the British YouTube community, in 2012. A second series followed three years later. He announced the short comedy series Project: Library, written by himself, Tim Hautekiet and Jack Howard, in 2014. Later the same year he was also involved with the development of Tofu, an eight-part sex-culture web series commissioned by Channel 4 to accompany Russell T Davies' Cucumber and Banana.

== Selected bibliography ==
- Cook, Benjamin (2003). Doctor Who: The New Audio Adventures – The Inside Story. Berkshire: Big Finish. ISBN 978-1-84435-034-6.
- Davies, Russell T; and Cook, Benjamin (2008). Doctor Who: The Writer's Tale. London: BBC Books. ISBN 978-1-84607-571-1.
- Davies, Russell T; and Cook, Benjamin (2010). Doctor Who: The Writer's Tale: The Final Chapter. London: BBC Books. ISBN 978-1-84607-861-3.
