= Conviction (2004 TV series) =

- Genre: Crime drama
- Created by: Bill Gallagher
- Starring: William Ash; David Warner; Ian Puleston-Davies; Reece Dinsdale; Nicholas Gleaves; Laura Fraser; Jason Watkins; Zoë Henry
- Composer: Ben Bartlett
- Country of origin: United Kingdom
- Original language: English
- No. of series: 1
- No. of episodes: 6 (list of episodes)

Production
- Executive producers: Nicola Shindler; Gareth Neame
- Producer: Ann Harrison-Baxter
- Running time: 58 minutes
- Production company: Red Production Company

Original release
- Network: BBC Three
- Release: 7 November – 21 November 2004

Conviction is a British television crime drama that premiered on BBC Three on 7 November 2004. The six-part series stars William Ash, David Warner, Ian Puleston-Davies, Reece Dinsdale, Nicholas Gleaves, Laura Fraser, Jason Watkins and Zoë Henry.

The series was created and was written by Bill Gallagher (previously known for Clocking Off and Out of the Blue), produced by Red Production Company, and directed by Marc Munden (Vanity Fair, Canterbury Tales: The Knight's Tale). The producer was Ann Harrison-Baxter (The Second Coming, The Cops), with Nicola Shindler and Gareth Neame as executive producers for Red Production Company and the BBC respectively.

The storyline was later used as the basis for the movie Blood, starring Paul Bettany, Mark Strong and Brian Cox.

== Premise ==
The series is centred on the Fairburn family, all of whom live in an edgy Lancashire town with a growing tendency towards vigilante justice. All three of the Fairburn siblings are involved with law enforcement: brothers Chrissie (William Ash) and Ray (Nicholas Gleaves) are police officers, while their sister Beth (Zoë Henry) works as a lawyer. Beth, Chrissie and Ray's widowed father Lenny (David Warner) is a retired police officer who berates the political correctness of his children's modern methods: he himself is fighting a losing battle with Alzheimer's disease and struggling to come to terms with the fact that he can no longer be the strong and authoritative head of the family.

Ray and Chrissie work as officers in a five-person Criminal Investigation Department team. The other members are the solitary but insightful Robert (Reece Dinsdale); Lucy (Laura Fraser), the newest recruit, with a need to prove herself; and the volatile family man Joe (Ian Puleston-Davies), an 'old school' officer with a barely contained temper and a tendency to both bully Chrissie and clash with the "by-the-book" Ray.

The murder of a 12-year-old girl adds to existing tensions and pushes an already angry community towards action and revenge. In this atmosphere, the various policemen involved in the murder investigation begin to take increasingly dangerous steps towards concluding the investigation. The situation becomes even more complicated when Beth becomes the defence lawyer for the principal suspect, Jason Buliegh (Jason Watkins). As the distinction between right and wrong becomes fatally blurred, two of the officers take things a step too far.

== Background ==
Conviction was described by the BBC as a drama which "explores the notion that everyone has the ability to kill and what it is that can trigger that reaction in any of us (using) the volatile and dangerous world of the CID as a backdrop to show how a group of very real characters are affected practically, mentally and emotionally by what they have to face on a daily basis. It's also about the resilience and humour of family and friends as they too deal with the psychological fallout." The drama makes multiple uses of flashbacks and fast-forwards, interlinking time and obscuring the line between reality and fantasy.

Executive producer Nicola Shindler recalled "Bill came up with a basic idea about an incident involving two policemen which severely affects their life both at work and at home and, from that, we developed the idea about a family who worked in the police station... I think that Conviction is more of a 'whydunnit' not 'whodunnit' because it looks at people's psyche. It takes apart the idea that there are 'good' and 'evil' people in the world – it shows that things are not as black and white as that."

Gallagher commented: "I wanted to write a police drama that I would like to watch. One that would thrill me and disturb me. One that would shake me up and be about subjects that really matter, not just the stories, but the way that the stories are told. I tried to take the characters to places that they wouldn't want to go, were scared to go and to see what happened. I wanted to try and take a daring and confrontational approach. This wasn't me and Marc (Munden, the director) indulging some arty idea but looking for ways to crank up the tension, to delight in the storytelling and keep the thing moving at a real pace. Sometimes we have to hang on for two or three scenes until it adds up, 'till the pieces slot together. But when we get there, it's more fulfilling than having it handed to us on a plate. This series isn't based on any particular crime or case, but on what I feel is in the air, how we react when awful crimes happen. We live in angry times and I wanted to build Conviction around how people feel, how they react, how they relate and why."

Producer Ann Harrison-Baxter commented: "The majority of crime dramas are very black and white, good versus evil, and the police represent good. But life isn't actually like that – it's very grey in all those areas of morality. Bill has taken a genre and a group of characters that are portrayed in a particular way in British drama, and turns it all on its head... (The characters) are detectives, they work for the police force, but first and foremost they are human beings like you and I and although they are meant to be the upholders of morality and good, they are human and they do have emotions and sometimes those emotions get the better of them."

== Cast ==
- William Ash as D.C. Chrissie Fairburn
- Ian Puleston-Davies as D.C. Joe Payne
- Reece Dinsdale as D.C. Robert Seymour
- Laura Fraser as D.S. Lucy Romanis
- Nicholas Gleaves as D.I. Ray Fairburn
- Zoë Henry as Beth Caffrey
- David Warner as Lenny Fairburn
- Jason Watkins as Jason Bueleigh
- Angel Coulby as Gemma Ryan
- Linzey Cocker as Miriam Payne
- Sarah Kirkman as Lucy Payne
- Sharon Duce as Sandra Bueleigh
- Jason Done as Sol Draper
- Dominique Jackson as Polly Caffrey
- Georgia May Foote as Angela Fairley
- Jennifer Hennessy as Judy Fairley

== Episode list ==
| No. | Title | Directed by | Written by | British air date | UK viewers (million) |
|---|---|---|---|---|---|
| 1 | "Episode 1" | Marc Munden | Bill Gallagher | 7 November 2004 | N/A |
CID are called out to investigate when twelve year old Angela Fairley is found dead on a local skate park. Suspicion immediately falls on Jason Buleigh, a local shop owner who took a shine to Angela and had previous convictions for sexual assault on a minor. Whilst in interview, Buleigh refuses to play ball, leading Joe and Chrissie to make the fateful decision to track him down at his mother's address and put the frighteners on him. However, Joe takes things a step too far, and after confronting Buleigh, whacks him around the head with a shovel, causing his death.
| 2 | "Episode 2" | Marc Munden | Bill Gallagher | 7 November 2004 | N/A |
Chrissie feels guilty for his part in Buleigh's death, and when Buleigh's disappearance is noticed by Ray and Robert, Chrissie decides to help Buleigh's mother search for answers. Meanwhile, Chrissie's dad, Lenny, continues to be confused over the events of the night in question, leading Chrissie to warn him not to talk about what happened. Lucy is torn over whether or not to pursue a relationship with her informant, Sol, while Joe and Ray question Angela's mother about a fight that they had the previous day when she caught Angela shoplifting from the local mall.
| 3 | "Episode 3" | Marc Munden | Bill Gallagher | 14 November 2004 | N/A |
Ray and the team begin to probe the theory that Angela may not have been killed by Buleigh. Lucy realises that the gang that Angela was hanging around with were responsible for the attack on Mr. Lyndon. Joe continues to question the story behind Angela's tattoo, and manages to convince Angela's best friend to open up about the gang she was associating with. A lead takes the team to an abandoned shop, where they find what appears to be the crime scene. In interview, two young boys arrested by Ray and Robert confirm they were responsible for Angela's murder.
| 4 | "Episode 4" | David Richards | Bill Gallagher | 14 November 2004 | N/A |
Whilst out on surveillance, Joe and Chrissie come across a frantic man brandishing a gun, who has kidnapped a hostage after shooting a cashier dead at a nearby petrol station. Chrissie is shot in the ensuing confrontation, and Joe is taken hostage. Joe is forced to communicate via his daughter, Miriam, in order to lead the team to the location where he is being held. However, increasingly upset and anxious hostage Gail threatens to blow his plan to escape. Meanwhile, Beth reveals she is pregnant, leading Lenny to reveal a shocking secret from his past.
| 5 | "Episode 5" | David Richards | Bill Gallagher | 21 November 2004 | N/A |
Convinced that Jason Buleigh's body is about to be found, Joe decides to move the body, but a dogwalker later finds the disturbed grave and leads the team to the site, where traces of Buleigh's DNA is found. As a wider search of the woods gets underway, Joe is forced to move the body once more. As his behaviour becomes more and more erratic, he decides that his only way of escape is to dump Buleigh's body and burn it. Meanwhile, Chrissie becomes increasingly anxious when he realises that young Polly and Lenny have come into possession of Buleigh's travel card.
| 6 | "Episode 6" | David Richards | Bill Gallagher | 21 November 2004 | N/A |
Unaware that he was spotted dumping Buleigh's body, Joe tries to cover his tracks by making Chrissie sign a speeding form claiming he was driving Joe's car that night. Lucy's informant Sol manages to lead her to the witness that saw Joe dumping Buleigh's body, so Lucy recruits Beth in order to prove Joe's guilt. Ray and Robert begin to realise that Joe may be the suspect they are looking for, and when Joe realises that a vital piece of evidence that links him to Buleigh's death has disappeared from his desk drawer, it looks as if he is about to be found out.
