= Julie Hesmondhalgh =

English actress and narrator (born 1970)

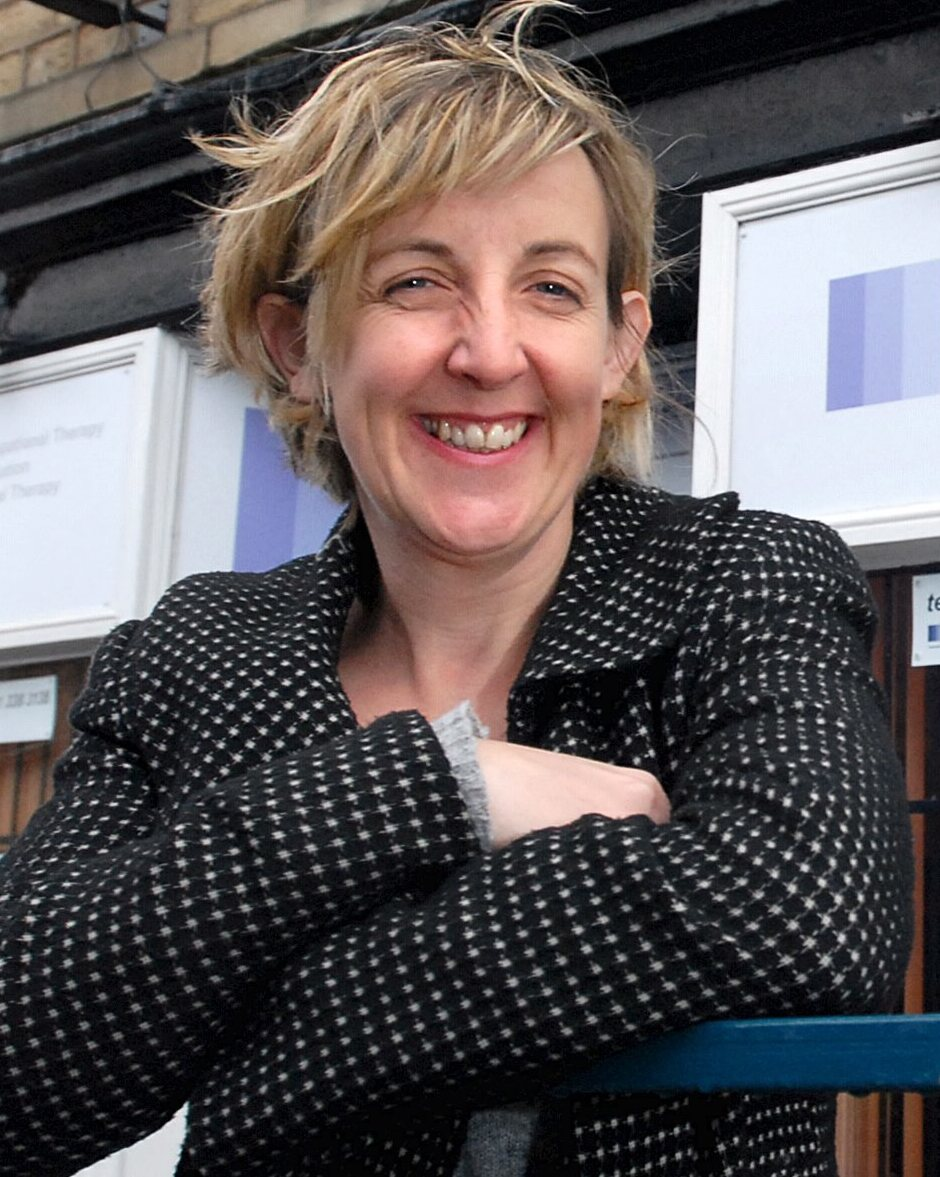
- Hesmondhalgh in 2008
- Born: Julie Claire Hesmondhalgh; 25 February 1970 (age 56); Accrington, Lancashire, England
- Education: London Academy of Music and Dramatic Art
- Occupations: Actress, narrator
- Years active: 1988–present
- Television: Coronation Street (1998–2014); Cucumber (2015); Happy Valley (2016); Broadchurch (2017); The A Word (2020)

Julie Claire Hesmondhalgh (/ˈhɛzməndhælʃ/ HEZ-mənd-halsh; born 25 February 1970) is an English actress and narrator who is best known for her role as Hayley Cropper in Coronation Street between 1998 and 2014. For this role she won "Best Serial Drama Performance" at the 2014 National Television Awards and "Best Actress" at the 2014 British Soap Awards.

Hesmondhalgh's other regular television roles include Cucumber (2015), Happy Valley (2016), Broadchurch (2017) and The Pact (2021). Her stage credits include God Bless the Child at the Royal Court Theatre in London (2014), and Wit at the Royal Exchange, Manchester (2016). For her performance as Joan in the James Graham play Punch (2025), she won the 2026 Laurence Olivier Award for Best Actress in a Supporting Role.

== Early life and education ==
Julie Claire Hesmondhalgh was born in Accrington, Lancashire on 25 February 1970. She attended Accrington Academy (when it was called Moorhead High School) and was head girl. She studied acting at the London Academy of Music and Dramatic Art, graduating winning the Lally Bowers Award for Best Comedy Actress.

== Career ==
=== Television ===
In the 1990s, Hesmondhalgh appeared in such television dramas as The Bill, Catherine Cookson's The Dwelling Place, and in the Victoria Wood comedic television movie Pat and Margaret.

She is most known for playing Hayley Cropper in the ITV soap opera Coronation Street. Making her debut appearance on the show in January 1998, she played the first transgender character in a British soap opera. On 11 January 2013, ITV announced that Hesmondhalgh would be leaving Coronation Street in January 2014 after 15 years on the show, and that her character Hayley was to leave in a controversial right-to-die storyline, following a battle with pancreatic cancer. Hesmondhalgh won a National Television Award for Best Performance in a Serial Drama, which she shared with her longtime co-star, David Neilson.

In 2011, she appeared on ITV's The Cube.

In 2015, she played the role of Cleo Whitaker in the Channel 4 drama series Cucumber, written by Russell T Davies. She appeared in the BBC Four film Black Roses: The Killing of Sophie Lancaster, a television film about the murder of Sophie Lancaster. She played the role of Sophie's mother, Sylvia Lancaster, a role which she previously portrayed on stage. Hesmondhalgh was friends with Sylvia Lancaster is a former patron of the Sophie Lancaster Foundation. In 2015, Hesmondhalgh won a Royal Television Society Award for Best Female Actor in a Drama for her role as Sylvia.

Also in 2015, she appeared alongside Shane Richie and John Thomson, in an episode of the BBC drama Moving On, as well as one episode of the Steve Pemberton and Reece Shearsmith written comedy Inside No. 9. In 2016, she joined the cast for the second series of the BBC One drama thriller Happy Valley. She was offered the role by creator, writer and executive producer Sally Wainwright. Her character Amanda Wadsworth, is a midwife and working mother from Yorkshire who has a fraught relationship with her husband, John (Kevin Doyle).

In 2017, Hesmondhalgh played the role of rape victim Trish in the third and final series of Broadchurch on ITV. Her performance as Trish earned her a nomination for BAFTA award for best supporting actress (TV).

She appeared as a guest star in the Doctor Who episode "Kerblam!".

In 2019, she starred alongside Rob Delaney and Sharon Horgan, when she played Amanda in the first episode of the final season of Channel 4's Catastrophe. In 2020, She appeared with Dawn French in the six-part ITV comedy drama The Trouble with Maggie Cole. Also in 2020, Hesmondhalgh played Heather in the third series of The A Word.

In May 2021, Hesmondhalgh played Nancy in the BBC1 series The Pact, alongside Laura Fraser, Rakie Ayola, Eiry Thomas, Aneurin Barnard and Jason Hughes. The series, set in Wales, was written by Pete McTighe.

In 2021, Hesmondhalgh began narrating the revival of The Weakest Link, taking over from Jon Briggs.

In January 2024, she starred as Suzanne Sercombe, wife of subpostmaster Alan Bates, the main character in the ITV1 drama Mr Bates vs The Post Office, which was based on true events surrounding the British Post Office scandal.

Hesmondhalgh appeared on the second series of The Celebrity Traitors in October 2026.

=== Stage ===
From 19 to 29 September 2012, Hesmondhalgh appeared at the Royal Exchange Theatre in Manchester, portraying Sylvia Lancaster in Black Roses: The Killing of Sophie Lancaster opposite Rachel Austin. The play was based on the real-life story of Sylvia's late daughter, Sophie Lancaster. Hesmondhalgh won a Manchester Theatre Award for Best Studio Performance in 2013.

On 23 January 2014, she returned to the Royal Exchange Theatre in the Simon Stephens play Blindsided, which ran until 15 February that year. From 12 November to 20 December 2014, she played Mrs Bradley, with Amanda Abbington in the Vicky Featherstone directed God Bless The Child at the Royal Court Theatre in London.

In January 2016, she played Vivian Bearing, an American Professor of Poetry dying of ovarian cancer, in Margaret Edson's Wit at The Royal Exchange main stage, directed by Raz Shaw, for which she was nominated for a TMA and won a Manchester Theatre Award for Best Actress in 2017.

On 30 April 2017, Hesmondhalgh starred in a one-off performance at the Royal Court Theatre, of Lemn Sissay's The Report, directed by John E. McGrath.

In February 2018, she starred as Renee in The Almighty Sometimes by Kendall Feaver. It was directed by Katy Rudd at the Royal Exchange.

In February 2019, she performed the title role in Mother Courage and Her Children by Bertolt Brecht, adapted by Anna Jordan. It was directed by Amy Hodge at the Royal Exchange, Manchester.

For her performance as Joan in the James Graham play Punch (2025), she won the 2026 Laurence Olivier Award for Best Actress in a Supporting Role.

=== Writing and other activities ===
In 2019 Methuen Drama published her Working Diary as part of their Theatre Makers series.

She is a founder member of a Manchester-based grassroots theatre collective creating work about social issues, Take Back, which she runs with Rebekah Harrison and Grant Archer, and to which she has contributed as a writer and actor.

== Activism and fundraising ==
Hesmondhalgh is a Labour Party member. In August 2015, she endorsed Jeremy Corbyn's campaign in the Labour Party leadership election. She tweeted: "Proudly supporting Jeremy Corbyn in the Labour leadership contest." She campaigned for Corbyn as party leader in the 2017 UK general election. In May 2017, speaking at Labour's general election campaign launch in Manchester, she said: "I realised the Labour party and its core values would finally be in line with my own deeply held socialist beliefs about equality, justice and peace."

On 1 May 2013, Hesmondhalgh appeared on ITV game show All Star Mr & Mrs with her husband Ian, and won £20,000 for Maundy Relief.

Hesmondhalgh was awarded the Freedom of Hyndburn in 2015. She was also made an honorary life member of Bolton Socialist Club for her "outstanding contribution to socialism in 2015.

Hesmondhalgh is a patron of Trans Media Watch. In 2019, she set up the fundraising community group 500 Acts of Kindness. In 2025, she was granted honorary lifetime membership to Equity following her efforts to save Oldham Coliseum from being demolished.

== Filmography ==
Year	Title	Role	Type	Notes
1994	The Dwelling Place	Rose Turnbull	TV	3 episodes
1994	Pat and Margaret	Helper in Old Age Home	Film	
1994	The Bill	Jo	TV	Episode: "No Job for an Amateur"
1997	The Bill	Doctor	TV	Episode: "Do Unto Others"
1998	Dalziel and Pascoe	Wendy Walker	TV	Episode: "The Wood Beyond"
1998–2014	Coronation Street	Hayley Cropper	TV	Regular role; 1,436 episodes
2001	Live Talk	Herself	TV	Presenter; 11 episodes
2003	TV Burp	Hayley Cropper	TV	Episode #2.4
2009	Coronation Street: Romanian Holiday	Hayley Cropper	DVD	Coronation Street spin-off, released straight to DVD
2010	East Street	Hayley Cropper	TV	Charity crossover between Coronation Street and EastEnders for Children in Need
2015	Cucumber	Cleo Whitaker	TV	8 episodes
2015	Banana	Cleo Whitaker	TV	1 episode
2015	Inside No. 9	Kath Cook	TV	1 episode: "La Couchette"
2015	Black Roses: The Killing of Sophie Lancaster	Sylvia Lancaster	TV	1 episode
2015	Closets	Penny	Film	20-minute short
2016	Happy Valley	Amanda Wadsworth	TV	Series 2
2016	Moving On	Linda	TV	1 episode: "Taxi for Linda"
2017	Broadchurch	Trish Winterman	TV	Series 3
2018	Doctor Who	Judy Maddox	TV	Series 11, Episode 7: "Kerblam!"
2018	Peterloo	Female reformer	Film	Directed by Mike Leigh
2020	The Trouble with Maggie Cole	Jill Wheadon	TV	6 episodes
2020	The A Word	Heather	TV	
2020	The Importance of Being Honest	Andrea	Short film	
2021	The Pact	Nancy	TV	6 episodes
2021–present	The Weakest Link	Narrator	TV	12 episodes
2022	What Would Julie Do?	Julie	Short film	
2023	You & Me	Linda	TV	3 episodes
2024	Mr Bates vs The Post Office	Suzanne Sercombe	ITV1 drama series	4 episodes
2024	Alma's Not Normal	Aunty Ange	TV	2 episodes
2026	Crookhaven	Grandma Sue	TV	5 episodes
2026	The Celebrity Traitors	Contestant	TV	Series 2
2026	Call the Midwife: Sisters in Arms	Sister Alice	TV	upcoming British period drama

== Awards and nominations ==
Year	Ceremony	Award	Nominated work	Result	Ref.
	LAMDA	Lally Bowers Award (Best Comedy Actress)		Won	
1999	National Television Awards	Most Popular Actress	Coronation Street as Hayley Cropper	Nominated	
1999	The British Soap Awards	Best On-Screen Partnership (shared with David Neilson)	Coronation Street as Hayley Cropper	Won	
2004	The British Soap Awards	Best On-Screen Partnership (shared with David Neilson)	Coronation Street as Hayley Cropper		
2013	Royal Television Society	Best Performance in a Continuing Drama	Coronation Street as Hayley Cropper	Won	
2013	Royal Television Society North West	Best Performance in a Continuing Drama	Coronation Street as Hayley Cropper	Won	
2013	Inside Soap Awards	Best Actress	Coronation Street as Hayley Cropper	Shortlisted	
2014	National Television Awards	Best Serial Drama Performance	Coronation Street as Hayley Cropper	Nominated	
2014	TRIC Awards	Soap Personality	Coronation Street as Hayley Cropper	Nominated	
2014	The British Soap Awards	Best Actress	Coronation Street as Hayley Cropper	Won	
2014	The British Soap Awards	Best On-Screen Partnership (shared with David Neilson)	Coronation Street as Hayley Cropper	Won	
2014	Inside Soap Awards	Best Actress	Coronation Street as Hayley Cropper	Shortlisted	
2014	TV Choice Awards	Best Soap Actress	Coronation Street as Hayley Cropper	Nominated	
2015	Royal Television Society	Best Female Actor in a Drama	Black Roses: The Killing of Sophie Lancaster	Won	
2017	Manchester Theatre Awards	Actress in a Leading Role	Wit	Won	
2017	Manchester Theatre Awards	Stage Door Award for Excellence	Take Back Theatre	Won	
2018	British Academy Television Awards	Best Supporting Actress	Broadchurch	Nominated	
2018	Edinburgh Fringe	The Stage Edinburgh Award	The Greatest Play	Won	
2022	Audio Production Awards	Best Narrator	Harper Collins	Nominated	
2025	National Film Awards	Best Actress in a TV Series	The Post Office	Nominated	
2026	Laurence Olivier Awards	Best Actress in a Supporting Role	Punch	Won	
