= Danny and the Human Zoo =

- Genre: Drama
- Written by: Lenny Henry
- Directed by: Destiny Ekaragha
- Starring: Lenny Henry; Kascion Franklin; Evanna Lynch; Arthur Darvill; James Phelps; Oliver Phelps; Richard Wilson; Richard Boland; John Yapp; Peter Bankole; Michael Crump
- Composer: Ben Onono
- Country of origin: United Kingdom
- Original language: English

Production
- Executive producers: Polly Hill; Caroline Hollick; Nicola Shindler
- Producer: Juliet Charlesworth
- Running time: 90 minutes
- Production company: Red Production Company

Original release
- Network: BBC One
- Release: 31 August 2015

Danny and the Human Zoo is a British drama television film that first broadcast on BBC One on 31 August 2015. The ninety-minute film, written by Lenny Henry and directed by Destiny Ekaragha, is a fictionalised account of the former's life as a teenager in 1970s Dudley.

== Production ==
The film was commissioned by Charlotte Moore and Ben Stephenson. The head of BBC One wanted to give black actors more prominent television roles. The executive producers are Caroline Hollick, Nicola Shindler and Polly Hill.
