= European Urology =

- Discipline: Urology
- Language: English
- Edited by: Alberto Briganti

Publication details
- History: 1975–present
- Publisher: Elsevier
- Frequency: Monthly
- Impact factor: 25.3 (2023)

Standard abbreviations
- ISO 4: Eur. Urol.

Indexing
- CODEN: EUURAV
- ISSN: 0302-2838 (print); 1873-7560 (web)
- OCLC no.: 01809591

Links
- Journal homepage

European Urology is a monthly peer-reviewed medical journal covering urology. It was established in 1975 and is published by Elsevier. It is the official journal of the European Association of Urology. The editor-in-chief is Alberto Briganti (Vita-Salute San Raffaele University). According to the Journal Citation Reports, the journal has a 2023 impact factor of 25.3.
