= The Driver (TV series) =

- Genre: Crime drama
- Created by: Danny Brocklehurst; Jim Poyser
- Written by: Danny Brocklehurst
- Directed by: Jamie Payne
- Starring: David Morrissey; Ian Hart; Claudie Blakley; Colm Meaney
- Theme music composer: Lorne Balfe
- Country of origin: United Kingdom
- Original language: English
- No. of episodes: 3

Production
- Executive producers: David Morrissey; Nicola Shindler; Polly Hill
- Producer: Jolyon Symonds
- Production locations: Manchester, Greater Manchester, England
- Running time: 60 minutes
- Production companies: Highfield Pictures; Red Production Company

Original release
- Network: BBC One
- Release: 23 September – 7 October 2014

The Driver is a British crime drama television serial which aired on BBC One between 23 September and 7 October 2014. Written by Danny Brocklehurst, the three-part series stars David Morrissey and was directed by Jamie Payne.

== Cast and characters ==
=== Main ===
- David Morrissey as Vince McKee
- Ian Hart as Colin Vine & Craig Vine
- Claudie Blakley as Rosalind McKee
- Colm Meaney as The Horse

=== Supporting ===
- Sacha Parkinson as Katie McKee
- Alan Rothwell as Reg
- Harish Patel as Amjad
- Tom Gibbons as Ryan
- Leanne Best as Sarah
- Eve Steele as Cathy
- Julian Walsh as Martin
- Darren Morfitt as Mickey
- Andrew Tiernan as Darren
- Chris Coghill as Woodsy
- Lee Ross as Kev Mitchell
- Saira Choudhry as Tasha
- Chloe Harris as Jess
- Lewis Rainer as Tim McKee
- Nathan McMullen as Joseph Paslowski
- Judith Hershy as Donna
- Lee Toomes as Mr. Reynolds
- Dominic Coleman as Matthew
- Rick Bacon as Issac
- Ciara Baxendale as Amanda
- Shaun Dingwall as Detective Ryder
- Andrew Knott as Detective O'Connor
- Karl Collins as Greg Tyler
- Paul Hilton as Blake
- Kaye Wragg as Melinda

== Production ==
The serial was announced by BBC One on 10 January 2014 after it was commissioned by heads of drama Charlotte Moore and Ben Stephenson. Filming began in January 2014. The series was co-produced by Highfield Pictures and Red Production Company.

== Episodes ==
No.	Title	Directed by	Written by	Original release date	UK viewers (millions)
1	"Episode 1"	Jamie Payne	Danny Brocklehurst	23 September 2014	5.37
Depressed cab driver Vince McKee, bored with his job with its ghastly fares, out of love with wife Ros, and disrespected by his school-girl daughter, meets Colin, an old friend just released from a prison sentence for armed robbery. Ros detests him, but Vince takes up his invitation to play poker at the house of a man known as the Horse. The Horse offers Vince a cryptic and clearly illegal driving job, though it does come with a smart new car. Whilst kept in the dark about the nature of his first job for the Horse, it pays very well.
2	"Episode 2"	Jamie Payne	Danny Brocklehurst	30 September 2014	4.77
Vince is horrified to see Colin throw his victim into a pit though Colin tells him he should be happy to be earning extra money. Next morning early Vince rescues the man and drops him off at casualty, claiming he found him in the road before driving off. Ros discovers blood on her husband's shirt and becomes suspicious but he flees her questions by making an unannounced visit to their son Tim, who has joined a sect but refuses to see him. On his return he is visited by police, who tell him that the man he saved, Joseph Paslowski, is a dangerous gangster.
3	"Episode 3"	Jamie Payne	Danny Brocklehurst	7 October 2014	4.50
With Paslowski now out of his coma the police visit Vince. After visiting the badly injured Colin and asking to leave the gang he tries to bribe a colleague, Kev to give him an alibi but Kev tells the police and he is arrested. He confesses everything and is offered a deal - to carry on working with the gang and inform the police of their next planned job, the robbery of a Chinese supermarket. The family will be put under witness protection and given new identities, which angers Ros and daughter Katie.

== Reception ==
Lucy Mangan of The Guardian praised the first episode, highlighting the acting and script. Ellen E. Jones of The Independent felt the series got better after the opening episode, and praised Morrissey.

== American adaptation ==
In March 2022, AMC announced an American adaptation of the series starring Giancarlo Esposito, with a six-episode first season. It is co-produced by AMC Studios, A+E Studios and Thruline Entertainment with Theo Travers as showrunner. It premiered on AMC on 31 March 2024.
