= Peter Bankolé =

British actor (b. 1981)

- Born: 7 September 1981 (age 45); Kings Norton, Birmingham, England
- Other name: Peter Bankole
- Education: Rose Bruford College
- Occupation: Actor
- Years active: 2004–present

Peter Bankolé (born 7 September 1981) is a British actor.

== Early life ==
Bankolé was born in Kings Norton, an area of Birmingham, on 7 September 1981. He trained at Rose Bruford College, graduating in 2004.

== Career ==
In film he has appeared in The Duchess of Malfi in 2010, Red Faction: Origins in 2011, The Physician in 2013 and Danny and the Human Zoo in 2015. In television he has appeared in Casualty, The Rotters' Club, The Bill, Death in Paradise, and Clique.

=== Film ===
Bankole played the part of Ezra in the 2011 sci-fi film Red Faction: Origins which was directed by Michael Nankin. He appeared in the Philipp Stölzl directed The Physician which was released in 2013. He played the part of Mano Dayak. He played the part of Larrington in the Destiny Ekaragha directed film, Danny and the Human Zoo, which was a fictionalized account of Lenny Henry's teenage years spent in Dudley in the 1970s.

=== Television ===
One of his earliest roles was in Casualty, as Chris Barclay in the episode Don't Go There, which was broadcast on 23 May 2004. He played the role of Steve Richards in The Rotters' Club which began on BBC TWO on 26 January 2005. His role as Richards, the only black kid in school was newcomer and high achiever. The series was set when there was a time of social change and racial tension in the 1970s. In season 3, episode 2 of Death in Paradise which was about a murder on a film set, he played the part of Big Dave. The episode was broadcast on 21 January 2014.

=== Stage ===
In The Caucasian Chalk Circle, which played at the Unicorn Theater in 2009, he played Simon, a soldier who was proud of his promotion and pay rise, and who wanted to settle down and start a family. To research the role he watched a lot of war films, read books on the subject as well as internet research. In Fences which was playing at Milton Keynes Theatre in 2013, he played the part of Lyons the musician son of Troy Maxson (played by Lenny Henry) who is not impressed with some aspects of his son's musicianship. In her review for The Birmingham Post reviewer Melissa Henry described Bankole's performance as touching, raising the game higher, providing a wonderful evening. In Rachel De-lahay's Routes which was a follow-up to her successful play Westbridge, Bankole was noted for his giving life to the character Olufemi, a Nigerian who uses a false identity in his home country so he can join his wife and children in London. He appeared in Bijan Sheibani's The Barber Shop Chronicles which played at Londons National Theatre in 2017. Reviewer Maryam Philpott for The Reviews Hub noted his performance.

== Filmography ==
Film roles
Year	Title	Roles	Notes
2010	The Duchess of Malfi	Delio	Recorded live performance
2013	The Physician	Mano Dayak	
2016	The Dead Sea	Seydou	Short film
2016	Bloke Fears	One of the Conference of Mandem	Short film
2018	The Dark Heart Therapy	Counsellor	Short film
2019	Spider-Man: Far From Home	Mob Boss	
2019	Sweetness in the Belly	Yusuf	
2022	Mind-set	Daniel	

Television roles
Year	Title	Roles	Notes
2004	Casualty	Chris Barclay	Episode: "Don't Go There"
2004	Doctors	Tony Dunn	Episode: "Uncertain Justice"
2005	The Rotters' Club	Steve Richards	Miniseries
2006	The Bill	DC Watton	Episode: "434: A Different Type of Threat - Part 1"
2009	The Doctors	Josh Walcott	2 episodes
2011	Red Faction: Origins	Ezra	TV movie
2011	Borgen	Lokoyas Rådgiver	2 episodes
2014	Death in Paradise	Big Dave	Episode: "The Wrong Man"
2015	Danny and the Human Zoo	Larrington	TV movie
2015	River	Haider Jamal Abdi	Miniseries
2016	Peaky Blinders	William Letso	2 episodes
2017	Clique	Mo	3 episodes
2019	The Durrells in Corfu	Lumis	1 episode
2021–present	The Chelsea Detective	DC Connor Pollock	Series regular
2022	Andor	Astro-Traffic Control Officer	Episode: "Kassa"
2022	DI Ray	DS Kwesi Edmund	Miniseries

== Theatre credits ==
Year	Title	Role	Venue
2005	A Midsummer Night's Dream	Cobweb	Royal Shakespeare Theatre, Stratford-upon-Avon
2005	As You Like It	Forrest Lord	Royal Shakespeare Theatre, Stratford-upon-Avon
2006	The American Pilot	American Soldier	Soho Theatre, London
2006	Sing Yer Heart Out for the Lads	Barry	Theatre Royal, York
2007	Nakamitsu	Kochiyo	Gate Theatre, London
2007	Rough Crossings	Isaac	Birmingham Repertory Theatre, Birmingham & UK Tour
2008	Timon of Athens	Flaminius	Shakespeare's Globe, London
2008	A Midsummer Night's Dream	Francis Flute	Shakespeare's Globe, London
2009	The Caucasian Chalk Circle	Simon Khakhava	Leeds Playhouse, Leeds & UK Tour
2010	Volpone	Bonario	Greenwich Theatre, London
2010	The Duchess of Malfi	Delio	Greenwich Theatre, London
2011	In the Land of Uz	Person 9	Bush Theatre, London
2012	The Complaint	Mr Tabutanzer	Hampstead Theatre, London
2013	Fences	Lyons Maxson	Theatre Royal, Bath & UK Tour
2013	Routes	Olufemi	Jerwood Theatre, London
2014	Holy Warriors	Conrad Of Montferrat	Shakespeare's Globe, London
2014	Antony and Cleopatra	Eros/Messenger	Shakespeare's Globe, London
2017	Barber Shop Chronicles	Kwabena/Brian/Fabrice/Olawale	Dorfman Theatre, London & Leeds Playhouse, Leeds
2019	Three Sisters	Nmeri Ora	Lyttelton Theatre, London
