= Karl Collins =

English actor

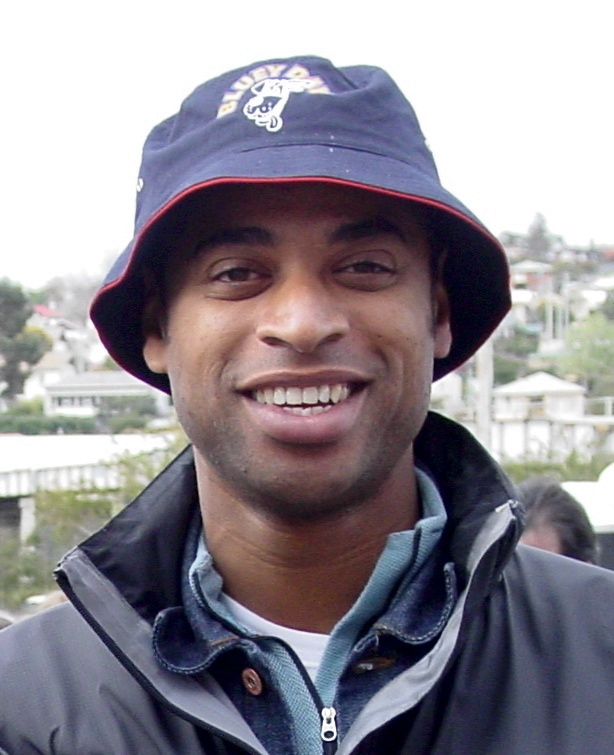
- Born: Clifton, Nottingham, England
- Occupation: Actor

Karl Collins is a British actor. He is known for his television roles as Danny Glaze in The Bill, Louis Loveday in Hollyoaks, and Shaun Temple in Doctor Who. He played Noah in the Apple TV series Trying, Lennox in the BBC Series Champion, and also Jack Whiteley in Magpie Murders.

== Early life ==
Collins was born in Nottingham, and grew up on the Clifton housing estate. As a child, he was a member of the Central Junior Television Workshop, and appeared in the programmes Dramarama and Your Mother Wouldn't Like It.

== Career ==
He played a car thief called 'Craven' in EastEnders in the early 90s, stealing a car from Frank Butcher's car lot.

He played DC Danny Glaze in The Bill from 1999 to 2003, and has appeared in Casualty, Holby City, By Any Means, As Time Goes By and 55 Degrees North. He also appeared in Shane Meadows' debut film, Twenty Four Seven.

In 2011, he appeared in "The Entire History of You", an episode of the anthology series Black Mirror.

In 2015, he appeared in "Our Zoo".

He also appeared in the theatre production One Monkey Don't Stop No Show in 2013.

Collins appeared in the Doctor Who Christmas Special "The End of Time", aired over the 2009 Christmas period, as Shaun Temple, Donna Noble's fiance. In 2023 he returned to the role as Donna Noble's husband.

On 10 February 2015, it was announced that Collins would be joining Channel 4 soap opera Hollyoaks as new regular character Louis Loveday. He made his first appearance on 3 March 2015 and departed on 22 January 2019 when Louis was killed off by Breda McQueen (Moya Brady).

== Filmography ==
=== Film ===
Year	Title	Role	Notes
1989	Bearskin: An Urban Fairytale	Edison	
1991	London Kills Me	Barman	
1996	Robert Rylands' Last Journey	Abraham	
1997	Twenty Four Seven	Stuart	
1999	G:MT – Greenwich Mean Time	Clinton	
2000	Melody's Her Second Name	George	
2005	Parallel Lines	Errol	Short film
2006	Life and Lyrics	Winston Dimby	
2008	Survey No. 257	Ray	Short film
2009	The Unloved	Karl	TV film
2010	Excluded	Mike	TV film
2011	Attack the Block	Dennis' Dad	
2011	Papa	Danny	Short film
2012	Turn a Blind Eye	Detective	Short film
2015	Mm-Hm	Karl	Short film
2021	Hollow	Father Hill	Short film
2023	The Flash	Lawyer	

=== Television ===
Year	Title	Role	Notes
1983	Dramarama	Billy	Episode: "Because I Say So"
1985–1988	Your Mother Wouldn't Like It	Various roles	Series regular; 21 episodes
1988	Hard Cases	Steve	1 episode
1991	Casualty	Roy	Episode: "Humpty Dumpty"
1991	The Bill	Everton Warwick	Episodes: "Fear or Favour, "The Best You Can Buy
1992	As Time Goes By	Protester #3	Episode: "Surprise, Surprise"
1992	EastEnders	Craven	Recurring role; 4 episodes
1993-1994	Parallel 9	Dr. Kovan	Series regular; 44 episodes
1997	The Bill	Damien Brown	Episode: "Different Strokes"
1998	Comedy Lab	Dube/Clever Jumbe	Episode: "Homie & Away"
1999-2003	The Bill	DC Danny Glaze	Main cast, 155 episodes
2001	Metrosexuality	Jordan	Series regular; 6 episodes
2004	A Thing Called Love	Floyd Staple	Episode: "True Confessions"
2004	Grease Monkeys	Trevor Baptiste	Recurring role; 9 episodes
2004	Holby City	Ken Thompson	Episode: "All the King's Men..."
2005	55 Degrees North	Adam Cole	Recurring role; 2 episodes
2007	New Street Law	Bobby Keen	1 episode
2007	The Visit	Lee	1 episode
2008	Silent Witness	Jerome Assante	Episode: "Safe"
2008	Casualty	Aiden Frazer	Episode: "Broken Homes"
2009–2010, 2023	Doctor Who	Shaun Temple	3 episodes
2010	Casualty	Neil Hope	Episode: "Russian Endings"
2010	Shelfstackers	Keith	Episode: "Training Day"
2011	Come Fly with Me	Disgruntled Passenger #3	1 episode
2011	Twenty Twelve	Bus Driver	Episode: "Visitors From Rio"
2011	The Fades	Higgy	Mini-series; 2 episodes
2011	Death in Paradise	Lawrence	Episode: "Arriving in Paradise"
2011	The Slammer	The Great Muscovado	Episode: "Home for Magic Rabbits"
2011	Black Mirror	Robbie	Episode: "The Entire History of You"
2012	Blackout	Bo	Mini-series; 3 episodes
2012	Holby City	Len Grace	Episode: "Fight the Good Fight"
2013	Youngers	Richard	Recurring role; 2 episodes
2013	By Any Means	DCI Whale	1 episode
2014	Our Zoo	Barlow	Recurring role; 2 episodes
2014	The Driver	Greg Tyler	Mini-series; 1 episode
2014	Transporter: The Series	Jerome Knight	Episode: "The Diva"
2015	This Is England '90	Lloyd	Episode: "Autumn"
2015–2019	Hollyoaks	Louis Loveday	Series regular; 221 episodes
2018	shortFLIX	Uncle George	Episode: "Batty Boy"
2019	The End of the F***ing World	Bonnie's Dad	1 episode
2019	Midsomer Murders	Samuel Wokoma	Episode: "The Miniature Murders"
2020	Vera	Ciaran Duggan	Episode: "The Escape Turn"
2021	Holby City	Treva Harding	Recurring role; 2 episodes
2021	The Larkins	Mr. Rance	Episode: "In Which We Meet the Larkin Family"
2023	Champion	Lennox	
2023	Culprits	Fixer	Recurring role
2022-4	Trying	Noah	Recurring Role
TBC	The Secret Diary of Adrian Mole Aged 13¾	Mr. Cherry	TV mini series

== Theatre ==
Year	Title	Role	Venue	Ref
2006	How Long Is Never? - Darfur	Ensemble	Tricycle Theatre, London	
2006	Fabulation	Herve/Guy	Tricycle Theatre, London	
2007	The Eleventh Capital	Entrepreneur	Royal Court Theatre, London	
2009	Category B	Errol	Tricycle Theatre, London	
2009	Seize The Day	Howard	Tricycle Theatre, London	
2009	Detaining Justice	Mr. Cole	Tricycle Theatre, London	
2010	Riff Raff	Mike	Arcola Theatre, London	
2013	One Monkey Don't Stop No Show	Brother Avery	Tricycle Theatre, London	
2013	Chimerica	Various roles	Almeida Theatre, London & Harold Pinter Theatre, London	
2018	Shebeen	George	Nottingham Playhouse, Nottingham & Theatre Royal Stratford East, London	
2018	Nine Night	Uncle Vince	Royal National Theatre, London	
2019	Our Town	Dr. Frank F. Gibbs	Regent's Park Open Air Theatre, London	
2019	in a word	Guy	Young Vic, London	
2021	Rockets and Blue Lights	Thomas/Trevor	Royal National Theatre, London	
