= Queer as Folk (British TV series) =

1999 British television series

- Genre: Drama
- Created by: Russell T Davies
- Directed by: Charles McDougall; Sarah Harding; Menhaj Huda
- Starring: Aidan Gillen; Craig Kelly; Charlie Hunnam; Denise Black; Andy Devine; Antony Cotton
- Composer: Murray Gold
- Country of origin: United Kingdom
- Original language: English
- No. of series: 2
- No. of episodes: 10

Production
- Executive producer: Nicola Shindler
- Producer: Russell T Davies
- Production locations: Manchester, England United Kingdom
- Cinematography: Nigel Walters
- Editor: Tony Cranstoun
- Running time: 35–50 minutes
- Production company: Red Production Company

Original release
- Network: Channel 4
- Release: 23 February 1999 – 22 February 2000

Related
- Queer as Folk (2000 series); Queer as Folk (2022 series)

Queer as Folk is a 1999 British television series that chronicles the lives of three gay men living in Manchester's gay village around Canal Street, where it was also filmed.

Initially running for eight episodes, a two-part follow up was shown in 2000. It was written by Russell T Davies and produced by Red Production Company for Channel 4.

== Background ==
The title of the programme comes from a traditional Northern English saying, "there's nowt so queer as folk", meaning "there's nothing as strange as people", and is a word play on the modern-day English definition of "queer" as homosexual. The script had originally started life with the title Queer as Fuck but Queer as Folk was considered more suitable.

== Characters and plot ==
The main characters are Stuart Allen Jones (Aidan Gillen) who is highly sexually active, and successfully so. His long-time friend Vince Tyler (Craig Kelly), who has a crush on Stuart, has less luck with men. 15-year-old Nathan Maloney (Charlie Hunnam) is new to the gay scene but is not lacking in self-confidence.

The producers stated that Queer as Folk, although superficially a realistic depiction of gay urban life in the 1990s, is meant as a fantasy and that Stuart, Vince, and Nathan are not so much characters as gay male archetypes.

Stuart, an advertising executive, possesses intrinsic power, able to bend anything to his will. Stuart's principal characteristic is that he does whatever he wants, whenever he wants, however he wants. He blows up a car belonging to his friend Alexander's antagonistic mother. He invites Vince's female colleague, who has a crush on closeted Vince, to Vince's birthday party and then introduces Vince's boyfriend. When offered a test drive of a Jeep by a car salesman who makes some homophobic comments, Stuart drives the car straight through the large window of the car dealership.

== Reception ==
At the time, the response was mixed from gay commentators in relation to the portrayal of the characters. The series was criticised by the gay press for not addressing the issue of the AIDS epidemic. In the wider press and media, a commentator in the Daily Mail called for censorship. The series received a more positive reappraisal twenty years after it first aired.

The first four episodes were sponsored by Beck's Brewery but the company withdrew their sponsorship halfway through the series. Following a backlash from the gay community, Beck's offered to sponsor the second series, a request which was refused by the producers.

In 2010, The Guardian ranked Queer as Folk at number 13 in their list of "The Top 50 TV Dramas of All Time".

== Awards ==
Gillen was nominated for Best Actor at the 2000 British Academy Television Awards for his role, whilst the series was nominated for Best Drama Serial at the 1999 Royal Television Society Awards. Murray Gold won the Best Music – Original Score at the 1999 RTS Craft & Design Awards while Pam Tait was nominated for Best Costume Design – Drama.

== Music ==
The theme song was created by Murray Gold. A soundtrack album was released by Almighty Records for the original series and features tracks by OT Quartet, Ultra Naté, and Blondie. Selling 125,000 copies, its popularity endured well after the broadcast of the first series, and it ended up the 50th biggest selling compilation album of 1999. An album for the second series was released by Channel 4 Music and sold 19,000 copies in its first week to debut at #5 on the UK Compilation Chart.

== Cast ==
- Aidan Gillen as Stuart Alan Jones, a successful advertising executive
- Craig Kelly as Vince Tyler, a supermarket manager
- Charlie Hunnam as Nathan Maloney, a 15-year-old rebel
- Denise Black as Hazel Tyler; Vince's free-spirited mother
- Andy Devine as Bernard Thomas; Hazel's lodger
- Jason Merrells as Phil Delaney; a close friend of Vince and Stuart
- Esther Hall as Romey Sullivan; whose baby Stuart fathered by donating his sperm
- Saira Todd as Lisa Levene; Romey's partner
- Carla Henry as Donna Clark; Nathan's best friend
- Ben Maguire as Christian Hobbs; an arrogant classmate of Nathan and Donna
- Alison Burrows as Sandra Docherty; Stuart's Assistant
- Caroline Pegg as Rosalie Cotter; one of Vince's co-workers, who is romantically interested in him
- Caroline O'Neill as Janice Maloney; Nathan's mother
- Antony Cotton as Alexander Perry; a flamboyant friend of Vince and Stuart
- Peter O'Brien as Cameron Roberts; Phil's accountant who starts a relationship with Vince
- Jonathon Natynczyk as Dazz Collinson; a bartender who has a brief relationship with Nathan
- Maria Doyle Kennedy as Marie Jones Threepwood; Stuart's recently divorced sister
- John Brobbey as Lance Amponah; Romey and Lisa's lodger
- Adam Zane as Dane McAteer, friend of Stuart, Vince and Alexander

== Episodes ==
Series	Episodes	Originally released	
Series	Episodes	First released	Last released
1	8	23 February 1999	13 April 1999
2	2	15 February 2000	22 February 2000

=== Series 1 (1999) ===
No. overall	No. in series	Title	Directed by	Written by	Original release date
1	1	Thursday	Charles McDougall	Russell T Davies	23 February 1999
Stuart and Vince, stalwarts of the Manchester gay scene, are out on the pull in Canal Street.
2	2	Stuart Alan Jones	Charles McDougall	Russell T Davies	2 March 1999
Stuart pursues a client, Vince (not 'out' at work) is pursued by the new girl and Nathan, verging on obsession, is desperate to find Stuart again.
3	3	A Night Out	Charles McDougall	Russell T Davies	9 March 1999
Stuart and Vince, on a wild night out, are pursued by Nathan and Rosalie, and Phil makes a new friend… with deadly consequences.
4	4	D.I.S.C.O.	Charles McDougall	Russell T Davies	16 March 1999
Stuart and Vince go to Phil’s funeral where they meet up with numerous friends including his accountant Cameron Roberts, and come face to face with his mother’s grief.
5	5	The Date	Sarah Harding	Russell T Davies	23 March 1999
Stuart makes some new friends, while Nathan’s behaviour makes Hazel furious and Janice desperate.
6	6	Meet the Parents	Sarah Harding	Russell T Davies	30 March 1999
Stuart and Marie visit their parents, and Vince introduces Cameron to his mum. Meanwhile, Stuart has a violent confrontation with Nathan’s father.
7	7	Thirty	Sarah Harding	Russell T Davies	6 April 1999
Stuart throws a surprise party for Vince’s 30th birthday, and becomes implicated in a dubious plan to discredit Romey’s potential husband Lance.
8	8	Punchline	Sarah Harding	Russell T Davies	13 April 1999
Vince is petrified that Rosalie has revealed his secret. Stuart experiences rejection for the first time. And Cameron declares his love to Vince.

=== Series 2 (2000) ===
No. overall	No. in series	Title	Directed by	Written by	Original release date
9	1	Out of the Closet...	Menhaj Huda	Russell T Davies	15 February 2000
Vince’s love for Stuart remains unrequited, but the sexual buzz between them is becoming irresistible. Stuart is forced to out himself to his parents, when he is blackmailed. Meanwhile, Nathan reappears to celebrate his return from London.
10	2	...Into the Fire	Menhaj Huda	Russell T Davies	22 February 2000
When Alexander’s parents turn on him, Stuart’s anger puts him on the wrong side of the law. Vince is up for a promotion at work, while one of Nathan's teachers seems to side with Nathan's bullies.

== Ratings ==
=== Series 1 (1999) ===
Episode no.	Air date	Viewers (millions)	Channel 4 weekly ranking
1	23 February 1999	3.52	11
2	2 March 1999	3.60	9
3	9 March 1999	2.45	23
4	16 March 1999	2.58	21
5	23 March 1999	2.78	17
6	30 March 1999	3.28	9
7	6 April 1999	3.44	9
8	13 April 1999	3.34	7

=== Series 2 (2000) ===
Episode no.	Air date	Viewers (millions)	Channel 4 weekly ranking
1	15 February 2000	2.83	19
2	22 February 2000	3.15	12

== Spin-offs ==
A spin-off series, Misfits (no relation to the later E4 series of the same name), was initially commissioned by Channel 4. The series would have followed the characters of Hazel, Alexander, Donna (who was absent from the 2nd series due to scheduling commitments) and Bernard from the original series, while introducing new characters. Although Davies developed draft scripts for four episodes and storylines for a further twenty-two, the series was cancelled before it went into pre-production.

As a result of Channel 4's decision, Davies pulled out of a deal that would have seen a series of Queer as Folk short stories published on the broadcaster's website, and vowed not to work with Channel 4 again, unless he has an idea that only works on that channel. However, fifteen years later in 2015, Davies returned to Channel 4 with drama series Cucumber, drama anthology Banana (on E4) and documentary series Tofu (on 4oD). Denise Black makes a cameo appearance as Hazel Tyler's ghost in the sixth episode of Cucumber.

== American-Canadian co-production version ==
Driven by the success of the series, American cable channel Showtime and Canadian cable channel Showcase co-produced an American-Canadian version, Queer as Folk. This is set in Pittsburgh, Pennsylvania although was filmed in Toronto, Ontario.

In late 2018, a second American-Canadian adaptation was in development for Bravo. In April 2021, it received a series order from Peacock, the streaming service it shifted to within the NBCUniversal family. It reimagines this series instead of serving as a reboot of the first American-Canadian series. Queer as Folk was released on June 9, 2022, on Peacock.

== See also ==
- The L Word
