= Bob & Rose =

2001 British television drama series

- Complete series DVD cover
- Genre: Romantic drama
- Created by: Russell T Davies
- Starring: Lesley Sharp; Alan Davies; Jessica Hynes; Katy Cavanagh
- Country of origin: United Kingdom
- Original language: English
- No. of series: 1
- No. of episodes: 6

Production
- Producer: Red Production Company
- Running time: 45 minutes (per episode)

Original release
- Network: ITV
- Release: 10 September – 15 October 2001

Bob & Rose is a British television drama, originally screened in six one-hour episodes on the ITV network in the UK in Autumn 2001. It was produced by the independent Red Production Company, and was that company's first prime-time drama for the ITV network.

Bob & Rose was the inspiration for Jules & Mimi, the fictional British television show featured in Sex and the City.

== Production ==
The series was written by Russell T Davies, who had previously been responsible for the much-discussed Channel 4 drama Queer as Folk, another Red Production Company programme.

Bob was played by stand-up comedian and actor Alan Davies (no relation to writer Russell), who was at the time best known for his lead role in the BBC television mystery series Jonathan Creek. Rose was played by actress Lesley Sharp, who was nominated for the BAFTA and Royal Television Society Best Actress awards for the part. Although critically well-received, Bob & Rose was not a huge success in terms of audience share for ITV, and the final two episodes were relegated from prime-time to later night slots.

== Plot ==
The story follows the life of gay school teacher Bob who is fed up with the shallowness of the gay club scene in Manchester. A romantic at heart, Bob yearns to meet the right person and settle down. After yet another unsuccessful date, he meets Rose while they are both waiting for a taxi. Rose is disenchanted with her down-to-earth boyfriend and is smitten with Bob but she does not initially realise he is gay. Subsequent episodes chart their on-off love affair which is bedeviled by the activities of Bob's best friend Holly. Holly (Jessica Hynes) is secretly in love with Bob and does everything she can to quietly interfere with Bob's relationships with men because she does not want to lose him. Privately she is lonely and her only social life is through Bob and the gay clubs he visits. When Rose suddenly appears on the scene, Holly sees her as a threat, stalks her and may (or may not – the plot leaves the final matter in doubt) conspire with Bob's former boyfriend Carl to split Bob and Rose up. A situation is created which suggests Bob may have had a one-night stand with Carl and Holly deliberately preys on Rose's insecurities and creates further doubts. Eventually, she outright lies to Rose.

The story also follows the attempts of Rose's mother to find a reliable boyfriend, and Bob's campaigning mother who runs a fictional gay support group called "Parents Against Homophobia" (PAH!). The series is a gentle romantic comedy with each episode managing to end at an emotional or comic climax – as when Bob follows Rose down the street after they argue in a pub. He admits that their first heterosexual sex act has confused him but he wants to do it again. Equally confused, Rose turns towards the camera and unromantically says: "Oh bollocks!" and the credits roll.

The script takes some shrewd looks at emotions and motivations but also contrasts the different atmosphere and attitudes within gay and straight UK night clubs – as in the scene where a straight man cannot get into a straight club wearing trainers but the gay men can enter their club wearing skimpy satin sports clothes. One important scene which explains Bob's disenchantment with the gay clubs comes when he is approached by an attractive man who talks only about physical acts. Bob, desperate to be regarded as an individual, replies: "I’m a Capricorn".

The series has an up-beat ending which manages to resolve issues for all the main characters – even Holly eventually learns from her mistakes and blossoms into a person in her own right. Bob and Rose find happiness and Carl gets an angelic dream date.

== Cast ==
- Lesley Sharp as Rose Cooper
- Alan Davies as Robert Gossage
- Penelope Wilton as Monica Gossage, Bob's mother
- John Woodvine as William Gossage, Bob's father
- Jessica Hynes as Holly Vance, Bob's best friend
- Katy Cavanagh as Anita Kendrick
- Siobhan Finneran as Marina Marquess
- Daniel Ryan as Andy Lewis
- Barbara Marten as Carol Cooper, Rose's mother

== Episodes ==
No.	Title	Directed by	Written by	Original release date	UK viewers (millions)
1	Episode 1	Joe Wright	Russell T Davies	10 September 2001	<4.55
The first episode introduces the two characters. Bob is a secondary school English teacher by day and by night he goes to the gay clubs on Canal Street, Manchester, and has casual encounters. Rose is an office supervisor in her mid thirties, stuck in a stale relationship with a laddish boyfriend (Andy) who she no longer finds interesting. She still lives with her mother and her mum's new boyfriend since moving in with Andy horrifies Rose. On a night out, Rose finds herself dumped on the wrong side of town by a creepy taxi driver while Bob discovers his latest male date is cheating on a live-in boyfriend and Bob walks out of the date's home. They find themselves on the same street, both trying to hail passing cabs. They strike up a conversation over an illicit cigarette (Rose has quit). After they go their separate ways Rose uses the Internet to look up Bob's address. Thanks to Rose they meet again outside his house by "coincidence" and agree to go out together. Over dinner, Bob has to take his outer shirt off after the waitress spills a dirty plate on it. This reveals a gay-themed T-shirt and Rose reacts. After the meal, they continue talking and decide to return to Bob's house, where they hit the drinks. Later she spends the night in Bob's bed on a drunken sleep-over until she notices he is aroused and she leaves in a taxi. Just before the taxi arrives, Bob and Rose are standing outside and spontaneously, they embrace and kiss passionately. Confused about his own emotions Bob immediately calls her again offering to take Rose to another restaurant.
2	Episode 2	Julian Farino	Russell T Davies	17 September 2001	5.05
Bob takes Rose to a Canal Street club to meet some of his gay friends, some of whom he has slept with. This makes Rose slightly jealous. When the evening ends she visits her boyfriend on his night shift and gives him a food parcel and chats with him, possibly out of guilt for deceiving him. Bob goes to visit his middle aged parents who are involved in local gay rights activities and are unimpressed with Bob’s casual attitude towards their efforts. His mother chides his lack of fighting spirit by labelling him gay-esque or gay-lite. Rose has given in to the pressure and agreed to move in with Andy despite her misgivings. As she arrives at his flat, Andy comes down to greet her but she drives off very quickly and meets Bob. At a pub she ask to move into his spare room since she can't go home or to her boyfriend's. He makes some weak excuses and she throws a drink in his face. They argue outside the pub until Bob admits he wants her.
3	Episode 3	Julian Farino	Russell T Davies	24 September 2001	4.59
Episode three opens with Rose on her break at work, talking with her colleague over coffee. Her ex-boyfriend Andy arrives and he and Rose exchange possessions. Rose explains that she felt that their relationship had run its course and that she thinks that a split was best for both of them. He is upset and asks whether there was anyone else in her life. Rose replies that there is not. While leaving their school, Bob tells colleague Holly that he is going out for dinner with Rose that evening. Holly dashes home and on the pretence of forgetting her booking, rings round local restaurants until she finds the one that Bob has booked. Holly then invites her baffled father out to dinner at the same restaurant. Rose's spurned boyfriend Andy calls round to her mother's house looking for her, and is told where she has gone. He turns up at the restaurant and amid some embarrassment, words are exchanged and Andy ends up punching Bob. Andy storms off, clearly upset and Rose goes after him.
4	Episode 4	Joe Wright	Russell T Davies	1 October 2001	5.29
Bob and Rose decide to make their relationship public and they meet each other's circle of friends. This leads to some awkwardness on both sides. Bob's friends are baffled at his sudden change of habits, but are generally supportive of his new partner. Rose's friends are impressed with Bob and do not know at this time that Bob is gay – Rose has remained silent on the matter. Bob takes Rose to meet his parents, but they arrive at his parents house while Bob's mother is busy organising her protest group against homophobia prior to a demonstration. While all are busy, Bob describes the difficulties he had explaining his sexuality to his parents and their response to his news – particularly from his father. Increasingly suspicious of Trevor's finances, Rose searches her mother's house looking for evidence of his financial problems, where they discover an unauthorised James Bond magazine edited by Trevor. Rose confesses her love for Bob. Bob and Holly attend the demonstration organised by Bob's mother, which takes an unexpected turn. Bob confesses his love for Rose.
5	Episode 5	Joe Wright	Russell T Davies	8 October 2001	4.86
After being on the news for blocking the bus route with his mother during the protest, everyone is now aware of Bob and Rose's relationship and his sexuality. Rose's colleague pokes fun at her calling her boyfriend "Bobby Both Ways" and asks if he takes her shopping all the time. Later Bob and his mother plead "guilty and proud" in court and receive a minor fine, celebrating later in the pub with Rose and Holly. Holly is left out of the conversation between the two love birds, and later arranges to meet Gary, an ex-boyfriend of hers. Bob e-mails an old uber-nerd friend of his asking if he knows anything about Trevor and his Bond fanzine and makes a discovery. In the Register Office, revelations come to a head. Bob visits his ex-boyfriend Carl.
6	Episode 6	Joe Wright	Russell T Davies	15 October 2001	<5.09
Bob and Holly give Rose different stories about Bob's night with Carl, which makes her suspicious. Bob and Rose break up, returning to where they were at the beginning of the story. Both of them are clearly unhappy with their old lives despite putting a brave face on the situation. Eventually Holly owns up tearfully to Rose that she lied about Bob staying with Carl out of jealousy, that he loved Rose and not her. Later, Holly and Bob sit on a bench spotting hot men together until she points out Rose sitting on another bench. Sensing a cruel set up, Bob gets up to leave but Holly slaps him around the face and forces him to stay put. Rose whistles a jaunty tune smiling and the couple walk into each other's arms. The episode closes with Bob and Rose eating dinner together at home, with the sound of a baby monitor.

== Reception ==
=== Awards and nominations ===
Year	Association	Category	Nominee(s)	Result	Ref(s)
2001	British Comedy Awards	Best TV Comedy Drama	Bob & Rose	Won	
2001	British Comedy Awards	Best TV Comedy Actress	Lesley Sharp	Nominated	
2002	BAFTA TV Awards	Best Drama Serial	Anne Harrison-Baxter, Julian Farino, Joe Wright, Russell T Davies	Nominated	
2002	BAFTA TV Awards	Best Actress	Lesley Sharp	Nominated	
2002	BPG TV & Radio Awards	Best Actress	Lesley Sharp (also for Clocking Off)	Won	
2002	RTS Television Awards	Best Serials & Single Drama	Red Production Company	Nominated	
2002	RTS Television Awards	Actor – Female	Lesley Sharp	Nominated	

=== Controversy ===
As with Queer as Folk, Bob & Rose involved homosexuality as a key theme. The storyline involves a gay man falling in love with a woman and was loosely based on events in the real life of a friend of Russell T Davies. This storyline caused an uproar among some gay rights activists who felt that the series premise made it appear as if being gay was a choice or a phase, which then generated a strong counter-reaction by bisexuals who called the criticism unfair. However, the 'Bob' character states categorically in the script that he is not bisexual saying: "I was born gay, I’ll die gay and I’ll have a gay gravestone". He says that he was attracted to Rose as a person and not as a gender choice. He says he will 'always look at men' but Rose is the only woman for him.

== Home media ==
The entire series of six episodes was released on DVD on 15 April 2002 in the United Kingdom and on 17 February 2004 in the United States. The age certificate for the DVD in the United Kingdom is 15.

In 2020, the series was added to BritBox in the UK. This is, according to Russell T Davies, the first time the series has been made available either in rerun or streaming in the UK due to complex music licensing issues. For release on BritBox, Red Productions replaced most of the music and also edited a key scene involving the viewing of the football match.
