= Tofu (web series) =

- Genre: Documentary
- Created by: Russell T Davies
- Presented by: Benjamin Cook
- Composer: Murray Gold
- Country of origin: United Kingdom
- Original language: English
- No. of series: 1
- No. of episodes: 8

Production
- Executive producers: Russell T Davies; Nicola Shindler; Julie Gardner
- Running time: 11 minutes
- Production companies: Red Production Company; Adjacent Productions

Original release
- Network: All 4
- Release: 22 January – 12 March 2015

Related
- Cucumber; Banana

Tofu is a 2015 British online documentary series created by Russell T Davies and presented by journalist and YouTube host Benjamin Cook, available on All 4, Channel 4's video-on-demand service. The sister series to Channel 4's Cucumber and E4's Banana, Tofu is a documentary series that focuses on a range of sex attitudes in the twenty-first century from the viewpoint of everyday people. Like Cucumber and Banana, the name of the series refers to the same urological scale of hardness of the male erection which starts at tofu, goes through peeled banana and ends at cucumber from a European study that inspired Davies.

== Episodes ==
Journalist and YouTuber Benjamin Cook hosts everyday people discussing a variety of attitudes towards sex. I'm With Geek points out that although not tied to the narrative of Cucumber and Banana, the interviewees include the show's cast and the program discusses sex "with as much frankness as the show depicts it". Tofu offers an "honest, non-judgmental and entertaining view of sex and sexuality in the same way that Cook’s 'Becoming Youtube' did for the Youtube community."

No.	Title	Original release date
1	"Good Sex, Bad Sex"	22 January 2015
2	"Sex Talk"	29 January 2015
3	"Not Having Sex"	5 February 2015
4	"Coming Out"	12 February 2015
5	"Teenage Lust"	19 February 2015
6	"Queer as Fuck"	26 February 2015
7	"Instasex"	5 March 2015
8	"Filthy, Dirty Sex"	12 March 2015

== Production ==
Tofu was commissioned in 2013 as a sister show to Davies' dramas Cucumber and Banana. In development since 2006, Cucumber was announced along with companion series Banana, and web series Tofu in November 2013. The titles of all three shows come from a scientific study into the male erection which divided the hardness of the men's erections into a hardness scale consisting of tofu, peeled banana, banana, and cucumber; upon reading the study, Davies remarked that "right there and then, I knew I had my drama". Tofu is a food made by coagulating soy milk and then pressing the resulting curds into soft white blocks in gradations of soft, firm, or extra firm.

Described by the channel as an "anarchic and entertaining look at sex", Tofu explores issues that arise in Cucumber and Banana through interviews with actors for both shows and the public, such as one-night stands organised through apps like Grindr and sexual taboos. Requests for participants were issued in July 2014 and were open to anyone over eighteen, regardless of sexual orientation, gender identity, or sexual history; interested parties were asked to send a 90-second video to producers Red Production Company describing their "best sexcapade".

== Reception ==
As a documentary series, Tofu is seen as the odd-one-out of the triptych. Reviewing the first episode, Oli Dowdeswell of SoSoGay described the show as "an interesting concept, but one that doesn't work 100% of the time". Dowdeswell praised the interview segments of the episode, but was less positive about the dramatised "mini-Black Mirror" vignette, which he felt was out of place in a documentary series.

Sam Wollaston in The Guardian felt that even though the shows were "Gloriously, explicitly, triumphantly, cucumberly. Gay to the core." he didn't feel left out or see the subjects irrelevant; he also found Tofu "cum-in-your-face frank".
