= The Second Coming (TV serial) =

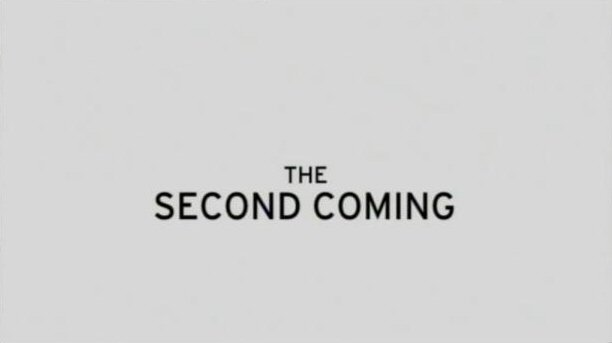
- The opening titles of The Second Coming
- Genre: Drama; Supernatural
- Written by: Russell T Davies
- Directed by: Adrian Shergold
- Starring: Christopher Eccleston; Lesley Sharp; Mark Benton; Kenny Doughty
- Composer: Murray Gold
- Country of origin: United Kingdom
- Original language: English
- No. of episodes: 2

Production
- Executive producers: Nicola Shindler; Russell T Davies
- Producer: Ann Harrison-Baxter
- Editor: Tony Cranstoun
- Running time: 145 minutes
- Production company: Red Production Company

Original release
- Network: ITV
- Release: 9 February – 10 February 2003

The Second Coming is a two-part British television drama first screened on ITV in the United Kingdom in February 2003. It concerns the realisation of humble video store worker Steve Baxter (played by Christopher Eccleston) that he is in fact the Son of God, and has just a few days to find the human race's Third Testament and thus avert the Apocalypse.

It was written by Russell T Davies (later head writer of the 2005 series of Doctor Who), and produced by the independent Red Production Company. The programme was originally commissioned as four one-hour episodes by Channel 4 in 1999; however, when new executives took over running the drama department at that channel, they decided not to pursue the project. Davies and Red's founder Nicola Shindler took the project to the BBC, who quickly turned it down; it found a home on ITV, a channel that had gained a reputation for producing mainstream, unchallenging, "middle-of-the-road" drama in recent years.

Screened over two successive evenings in prime time on Sunday and Monday, 9–10 February 2003, The Second Coming gained viewing figures of over six million. Davies, who is an atheist, has said his intention was to provoke debate and get people thinking about religion.

== Plot ==
Steve Baxter (Christopher Eccleston) addresses the crowd who have come to worship him outside the police station in the first episode.

Steve Baxter disappears from Manchester for forty days and forty nights after a drunken night out celebrating his best friend Judy's divorce. He is found wandering Saddleworth Moor, and claims to be the Second Coming of Jesus. He is met with scepticism, though one of the few people who believes him is a young Catholic priest who mentions an obscure Christian text that says that the lamb will be sent to the city of the North, followed by a series of numbers that turned out to be map co-ordinates.

Steve decides to indicate he is really the son of God by turning night into day over Maine Road. He then announces he must find the Third Testament within five days, saying that humanity needs to start taking responsibility for their actions. It is revealed that Steve's father could not have fathered him as he was born infertile, suggesting that Steve is really the son of God.

Steve saying that the world will end if the testament is not found. Some of his friends accept him as the Messiah, though Judy – an atheist – remains sceptical. Steve says that while he is neither omniscient (instead, relying on information "downloads") nor omnipotent, he refuses to use the powers he does have to avoid becoming power mad and reiterates humanity's need to sort its own problems. He visits Judy to work out what the testament is, and she reveals to him that it is the record she is keeping of events. She makes him spaghetti laced with rat poison, but tells him of this before serving it to him. She states that it is Judgement Day for Steve and God, and that the argument of God's existence has led humanity to do so many bad things. Steve is persuaded by Judy that he must die so that humanity fights for itself rather than relying on the evils of fundamentalism. This will not only be the death of him, but of God, Satan, heaven and hell, and of all religion. At first, Steve thinks Judy is influenced by demons, before realising this is indeed the Third Testament. He decides that it is time to die, and he eats his Last Supper.

An earlier draft of the script features a twist ending in which Judy is married to Steve, who has simply given up his divinity and become human again, with only her recognising him. However, Davies was advised against ending the story this way by his friend and fellow writer Paul Abbott, who felt that it cheated the audience.

== Production ==
Lesley Sharp as the initially sceptical Judy.

Davies originally conceived the idea for the programme while on a car journey from Manchester to Liverpool with his friend, the television producer Tony Wood. His initial pitch to Nicola Shindler described a scene from the second episode, with the Son of God having returned to Earth, made love to the woman he loves and her asking him if he loves her.

The eventual production for ITV was produced by Anne Harrison-Baxter and directed by Adrian Shergold, with Davies and Shindler as executive producers. Davies himself directed some of the second unit material featuring real-life television personalities such as Richard and Judy and Trisha Goddard commenting on Steven Baxter, seen throughout the programme along with news reports featuring real-life newsreaders such as Jon Snow and Krishnan Guru-Murthy. The bulk of filming took place during the summer of 2002.

The change from four one-hour episodes to two ninety-minute instalments necessitated the cutting of much material from what would originally have been episode three, the opening half of the eventual second episode. Most of this material centred around Steve's friends and family being tested by the devil's servants as well as Steve's mother, who in the final edit is removed altogether and referred to only as having died some time beforehand. Some of this material was shot, and the scenes that did not make the programme were included as bonus features on the DVD release of the serial, released the week after the programmes's UK broadcast. Also included on the disc was an audio commentary from Davies and Shergold.

The first episode, shown at 9pm on Sunday 9 February gained an average overnight viewing figure of 6.3 million, winning its timeslot ahead of the nearest competition, a documentary on the actor Christopher Reeve on BBC One, which gained 5.5 million, a 21% share. The second episode lost a sixth of its audience, with an average of 5.4 million viewers, beaten by the drama series In Deep on BBC One, which gained a figure of 6.6 million.

The Second Coming has also been shown in other countries – BBC America broadcast the drama in the United States in late 2003; it has also been seen in Canada on Showcase, in Australia on the ABC, and in New Zealand by TVNZ. Some versions shown overseas are shorter, with certain scenes cut and the ending coming after the 'documentary' scenes rather than the very final scene in the supermarket car park seen in the UK version.

== Reception ==
Johnny Tyler (Mark Benton), the Devil's representative on Earth.

Critical reaction to the production was generally positive. The Observer newspaper's reviewer, Kathryn Flett, said that "the boldness of the subject matter was complemented by a script of considerable depth and humour, and there were performances of Bafta-grabbing brilliance from everybody involved". She particularly praised the performances of the two leads: "Christopher Eccleston, never knowingly under-intense, was perfectly cast as the Everybloke suddenly gifted with the ability to provide answers to the big questions and perform medium-sized miracles... Sharp, burdened (or perhaps liberated?) by bad hair and make-up for most of the film proved herself yet again to be one of Britain's finest actresses."

In The Times, Paul Hoggart's verdict on the first episode was that: "It is intelligent, often amusing, and, at times, passionate and provocative. It throws down a gauntlet to religion, especially in tonight's conclusion, and something happens at the end which is probably deeply blasphemous... There are some clunks and bumps in the script, but most are smoothed over by excellent acting."

Writing in The Guardian to preview the drama before it aired, Mark Lawson said that: "Transmuting different genres like wine made from water — comedy into romance into thriller — Eccleston, Sharp, Davies and his director Adrian Shergold have created a world in which it soon ceases to seem odd that God chose Manchester. Steve only knows how they did it, but they have." Commenting on the US showing on BBC America, New York Magazine reviewer John Leonard called it "...an interesting argument about the cost benefits of the possible death of God. Rough, rude, and wonderfully acted."

The Second Coming featured in two major categories at the 2004 British Academy Television Awards, the most important TV awards ceremony in the UK. In the Best Actor category Christopher Eccleston lost out to Bill Nighy (for State of Play) while the production itself was beaten by Charles II: The Power and The Passion in the Best Drama Serial category.

Delivering the Huw Wheldon Lecture at the Royal Television Society's annual convention in Cambridge in September 2005, Paul Abbott praised The Second Coming as one of the few genuinely innovative British television drama productions of recent years, describing it as: "...a television masterpiece. It grappled with the most colossal subject matter in the return of a messiah to earth. Not in a Robert Powell way. Modern earth. Manchester, actually. And mainly the scruffy end."
