= Finding Alice =

British television comedy-drama series

- Genre: Comedy drama
- Written by: Roger Goldby; Simon Nye
- Directed by: Roger Goldby
- Starring: Keeley Hawes; Nigel Havers; Joanna Lumley; Gemma Jones; Kenneth Cranham; Dominique Moore; Isabella Pappas; George Webster
- Composer: Edmund Butt
- Country of origin: United Kingdom
- Original language: English
- No. of series: 1
- No. of episodes: 6

Production
- Executive producers: Michaela Fereday; Keeley Hawes
- Producer: Margot Gavan Duffy
- Running time: 60 minutes
- Production companies: Red Production Company; Bright Pictures TV; Buddy Club Productions; Genial Productions

Original release
- Network: ITV
- Release: 17 January – 21 February 2021

Finding Alice is a British television six-part comedy-drama produced by RED Production Company (a StudioCanal company) in association with Bright Pictures TV, Buddy Club Productions and Genial Productions. It premiered on ITV in the UK on 17 January 2021.

The drama concerns a woman who discovers unwelcome facts about her partner after his sudden death.

On 1 March 2021, it was announced that Finding Alice would return for a second series. The filming for the second season was due to begin in February 2022; however, it was reportedly cancelled due to cast scheduling issues.

== Cast ==
The cast includes:

- Keeley Hawes as Alice Dillon
- Kenneth Cranham as Gerry Walsh
- Nigel Havers as Roger Dillon
- Gemma Jones as Minnie Walsh
- Joanna Lumley as Sarah Dillon
- Ayesha Dharker as Tanvi Lal
- Sharon Rooney as Nicola
- Rhashan Stone as Nathan
- Graeme Hawley as Graham Napely
- Jason Merrells as Harry Walsh
- Dominique Moore as Yasmina
- George Webster as George
- Isabella Pappas as Charlotte Walsh
- Charlyne Francis as Detective Prior
- Daniel Laurie as Zack

== Episodes ==
No.	Title	Directed by	Written by	Original release date	U.K. viewers (millions)
1	"Episode One"	Roger Goldby	Simon Nye	17 January 2021	8.44
For Alice, Harry and daughter Charlotte, moving into their new home should have been a dream come true. But it quickly turns into a nightmare when Alice discovers Harry dead at the bottom of the stairs. Harry designed the smart house, so it's weird and wonderful, and one more disorientation for Alice on top of her sense of loss and abandonment. Alice’s beloved partner is no more, and now she can't find the fridge.
2	"Episode Two"	Roger Goldby	Simon Nye	24 January 2021	7.92
Despite certain setbacks, Alice decides to go ahead and organise Harry's funeral. She finds herself at loggerheads with Harry's parents who disagree over what he would have really wanted. Unable to bear the thought of burying Harry in a graveyard far away or having him cremated, she decides to have him buried at home in the garden.
3	"Episode Three"	Roger Goldby	Simon Nye	31 January 2021	7.11
Alice feels lost without Charlotte when she decides she is ready to go back to school. The police endeavour to identify the mysterious figure on the CCTV footage before the inquest into Harry's death can proceed.
4	"Episode Four"	Roger Goldby	Simon Nye	7 February 2021	6.84
Alice is finding her situation difficult and is getting short of money, while Gerry has surreptitiously accepted an offer on the house. Alice must think of a way to prevent the sale going ahead while attempting to raise some capital.
5	"Episode Five"	Roger Goldby	Simon Nye	14 February 2021	6.78
Alice decides to reject Tanvi's offer as she believes Harry would have wanted her to develop the land herself. In the meantime her plans to have a baby face opposition from her mother, her daughter and the fertility clinic.
6	"Episode Six"	Roger Goldby	Simon Nye	21 February 2021	N/A
Alice is determined to develop Harry's land and will not succumb to being pushed about by anyone. Can she solve her list of problems before trying for his baby? She begins to build bridges with her family despite their differences, but soon finds herself lumbered with an uninvited lodger.

== Critical reception ==
Eleanor Bley Griffiths reviewing for the Radio Times described Finding Alice as "This interesting and ambitious drama", giving it four stars and adding that "Keeley Hawes gives a masterful performance in ITV’s darkly comic drama". Ben Dowell of The Times declared the drama's "classy acting outweighs the shopworn plot" and gave it four stars, Lucy Mangan for The Guardian mentions "thank god for Nigel Havers and Joanna Lumley" in her review giving it three stars, while Anita Singh of The Telegraph called the drama "a thriller, a comedy, or an episode of Grand Designs?" and gave it three stars.
