= Red Production Company =

British television production company

Red Production Company Limited
- Company type: Subsidiary
- Industry: Television
- Genre: Production company
- Founded: 1998; 28 years ago
- Founder: Nicola Shindler
- Defunct: June 4, 2025; 12 months ago
- Headquarters: MediaCityUK, Manchester, United Kingdom
- Key people: Patrick Schweitzer (CEO)
- Parent: StudioCanal (2013–present)
- Website: redproductioncompany.com

Red Production Company Limited was a British independent television drama production company that was founded by Nicola Shindler and owned by French production & distribution company StudioCanal.

== Background ==
Red Production Company was formed in 1998 by Nicola Shindler, a television producer who had worked on Our Friends in the North and Cracker. Red's first production was the controversial drama Queer as Folk, written by Russell T Davies and based on the lives of three gay men in the city. This was screened on Channel 4 in early 1999 and drew much comment and praise.

The same year, Red followed this up with another series for Channel 4, an anthology of six half-hour plays about love entitled Love in the 21st Century. Queer as Folk 2 arrived in 2000, and since then Red has expanded to produce dramas for nearly all of the main British television channels. The company's success led to an attempt by Granada Television – in whose Quay Street building the company rented offices – to buy it, but Shindler turned down their offer, wanting to retain control of her own company.

In 2013, Red moved into the MediaCityUK complex in Manchester. RED is now based in offices at Ancoats since 2022, with CEO Patrick Schweitzer (previously from Tall Story Pictures) at the helm.

In June 2025, StudioCanal announced that it would be shutting down Red Production Company, with Patrick Schweitzer having stepped down as chief executive officer in May and Red's current and future state being taken over by StudioCanal TV UK.

== Partnerships ==
In December 2013, it was announced that Shindler had sold a majority stake in Red to the French media company StudioCanal.

In 2015, it was announced that Shindler would provide creative guidance and management oversight to a new production company called Guilty Party, founded by the actor Simon Bird, Jonny Sweet, and Spencer Millman.

In 2016, Shindler went into business with author Harlan Coben to form the US-based production company, Final Twist Productions. Shindler is Co-CEO with Coben. StudioCanal will provide distribution services.

== Programmes ==
For BBC One

- Clocking Off (2000–03)
- Linda Green (2001–02)
- Sparkhouse (2002)
- The Good Housekeeping Guide (2006)
- Magnolia (2006)
- New Street Law (2006–07)
- Single Father (2010)
- Last Tango in Halifax (2012–2020)
- The Driver (2014)
- Happy Valley (2014–23)
- Ordinary Lies (2015–16)
- Danny and the Human Zoo (2015)
- Trust Me (2017)
- Come Home (2018)
- Years and Years (2019)
- Ridley Road (2021)

For BBC Two

- Flesh and Blood (2002)
- Indian Dream (2003)

For BBC Choice

- Having It Off (2002)

For BBC Three

- Burn It (2003)
- Casanova (2005)
- Conviction (2004)

For ITV

- Bob & Rose (2001)
- The Second Coming (2003)
- Mine All Mine (2004)
- Big Dippers (2005)
- Dead Man Weds (2005)
- Jane Hall (2006)
- Unforgiven (2009)
- Scott & Bailey (2011–16)
- Prey (2014–15)
- Paranoid (2016)
- Butterfly (2018)
- Finding Alice (2021)
- No Return (2022)

For Channel 4

- Queer as Folk (1999–2000)
- Love in the 21st Century (1999)
- Legless (2005)
- The Mark of Cain (2007)
- Cucumber (2015)
- It's a Sin (2021)

For E4

- Banana (2015)

For Sky One

- Now You See Her (2001)

For Sky Atlantic

- Hit & Miss (2011)

For Netflix

- Paranoid (2016)
- Safe (2018)
- The Stranger (2020)
- Stay Close (2021)

For Amazon Prime Video

- Anansi Boys (TBA)
