= Banana (TV series) =

British TV series

- Genre: Comedy drama
- Created by: Russell T Davies
- Written by: Russell T Davies
- Composer: Ben Foster
- Country of origin: United Kingdom
- Original language: English
- No. of series: 1
- No. of episodes: 8

Production
- Executive producers: Russell T Davies; Nicola Shindler; Julie Gardner
- Producer: Emily Feller
- Production locations: Manchester, Greater Manchester, England
- Running time: 23 minutes
- Production companies: Red Production Company; Adjacent Productions

Original release
- Network: E4
- Release: 22 January – 12 March 2015

Related
- Cucumber; Tofu

Banana is a 2015 British television series created by Russell T Davies and aired on E4. The sister series to Channel 4's Cucumber and the 4oD documentary series Tofu, Banana is a series focusing on LGBT youth in Manchester, around the narrative of Cucumber. Unlike Cucumber, which is a self-contained serial following the story of one gay man, Banana is an anthology series focusing on the wider LGBT spectrum. The series was nominated for the GLAAD Media Award for Outstanding TV Movie or Limited Series.

Banana develops some of the storylines of characters featured in Cucumber as well as introducing many new characters. Banana is primarily a self-contained series, occasional overlapping with the Cucumber narrative. Cucumber, Banana, and Tofu are all named after the same scale of erection hardness, with Banana symbolising the middle of the scale from the flaccid Tofu to the fully erect Cucumber.

== Episodes ==
No.	Title	Central character	Directed by	Written by	Original release date
1	Episode 1	Dean (Fisayo Akinade)	Lewis Arnold	Russell T Davies	22 January 2015
2	Episode 2	Scotty (Letitia Wright)	Lewis Arnold	Russell T Davies	29 January 2015
3	Episode 3	Sian & Violet (Georgia Henshaw & Hannah John-Kamen)	Lewis Arnold	Sue Perkins	5 February 2015
4	Episode 4	Helen (Bethany Black)	Lewis Arnold	Charlie Covell	12 February 2015
5	Episode 5	Josh & Sophie (Luke Newberry & Chloe Harris)	Luke Snellin	Matthew Barry	19 February 2015
6	Episode 6	Kay (T'Nia Miller) Amy (Charlie Covell)	Al Mackay	Charlie Covell	26 February 2015
7	Episode 7	Aiden & Frank (Dino Fetscher & Alex Frost)	Luke Snellin	Lee Warburton	5 March 2015
8	Episode 8	Vanessa & Zara (Lynn Hunter & Nikki Fagbemi)	Al Mackay	Russell T Davies	12 March 2015

== Production ==
=== Development ===
Banana was commissioned in 2013 as a sister show to Davies' long-developed project Cucumber, along with the online documentary series Tofu. The three series refer to a urological scale of erection hardness, which consists of tofu, peeled banana, banana, and cucumber. Unlike Cucumber, which focuses primarily on middle-aged gay men, Banana focuses on LGBT youth in Manchester that are on the periphery of the Cucumber narrative. The two series are primarily linked through the crossover character of Dean Monroe (Fisayo Akinade), who appears as a major character in both series, and are contrasted by social acceptance of the characters; whereas Akinade's character is more "open and confident" about his sexuality, the characters of Cucumber are former activists whose sexuality had to be less open.

Whereas Davies' 1999–2000 series Queer as Folk focused on gay men in the Canal Street club scene, Cucumber is a self-contained serial following the story of one middle-aged gay man, Henry Best (Vincent Franklin), Banana is an anthology series focusing on young characters across the LGBT spectrum. The show notably casts the first transgender actor in a transgender role in a UK television series, with comedian Bethany Black portraying Helen, a transgender woman. Davies insisted that a transgender actor be cast as Helen, going so far as to alter the script until Black was cast at the eleventh hour; Black was vocal in her praise for this, contrasting the decision with the casting of Jared Leto as a trans woman in the recent film Dallas Buyers Club, which she described as "a cisgender guy trying to play what he thought a trans woman would be like", and compared cisgender actors playing transgender roles to blackface portrayals in shows such as It Ain't Half Hot Mum. Helen's episode also features Cucumber character Cleo Wilkinson (Julie Hesmondhalgh), in a scene that symbolises a "passing of the baton" between Hesmondhalgh—the cisgender actress who portrayed the transgender woman Hayley Cropper in Coronation Street between 1998 and 2014—and Black and the wider trans community.

=== Production ===
Filming took place from June to September 2014.

== International broadcast ==
The series premiered on Logo in the United States on 13 April 2015 to a very low 24,000 viewers, which was less than half the viewership that had watched Cucumber before it.

The series airs on SBS Two in Australia.

The series is also available on TVNZ OnDemand in New Zealand and on Hulu in the United States.
