= Casanova (2005 TV series) =

British television comedy drama serial

- Genre: Period drama
- Created by: Russell T Davies
- Written by: Russell T Davies
- Directed by: Sheree Folkson
- Starring: David Tennant; Peter O'Toole; Rose Byrne; Nina Sosanya; Laura Fraser
- Composer: Murray Gold
- Country of origin: United Kingdom
- Original language: English
- No. of episodes: 3

Production
- Producers: Red Production Company; Granada Television; BBC Wales; Warner Bros. Television
- Running time: 164 mins (total)

Original release
- Network: BBC Three; Warner TV
- Release: 13 March – 27 March 2005

Casanova is a 2005 British television comedy drama serial, written by television scriptwriter Russell T Davies and directed by Sheree Folkson. Produced by Red Production Company for BBC Wales in association with Granada Television, the three-episode series was first screened on digital television station BBC Three from 13 March, with a repeat on mainstream analogue network BBC One commencing 4 April.

== Synopsis ==
Telling the story of the life of 18th century Italian adventurer Giacomo Casanova, based on his own twelve-volume memoirs, the one-hour episodes star Peter O'Toole as the older Casanova looking back on his life and David Tennant as the younger version. Rose Byrne, Rupert Penry-Jones, Matt Lucas, Shaun Parkes, Nina Sosanya and Laura Fraser are also featured.

== Cast ==
- David Tennant as Giacomo Casanova
  - John Sandilands as 5-year-old Giacomo Casanova
  - Zachary Fox as 11-year-old Giacomo Casanova
- Peter O'Toole as Old Giacomo Casanova
- Tom Burke as 20-year-old Giac Casanova
  - James Holly as 6-year-old Giac Casanova
  - Brock Everitt Elwick as 11-year-old Giac Casanova
- Laura Fraser as Henriette
- Rupert Penry-Jones as Grimani
- Nina Sosanya as Bellino
- Shaun Parkes as Rocco
- Rose Byrne as Edith
- Freddie Jones as Bragadi
- Glenna Morrison as Nanette Tosello
- Lucinda Raikes as Marta Tosello

Comedians Matt Lucas, Mark Heap, Simon Day and Matthew Holness make cameo appearances.

== Episodes ==
No.	Title	Directed by	Written by	Original release date
1	"Episode 1"	Sheree Folkson	Russell T Davies	13 March 2005
Castle Dux, Bohemia, 1798. Casanova, now a penniless librarian in his seventies, begins to tell his life story to Edith, a young kitchen maid in the castle he works in. We return to Casanova's childhood and humble beginnings as the son of an actor in Venice. As a young man he studies for the priesthood, but is expelled from his seminary. He then meets and falls in love with Henriette, whom the Duke of Grimani wants for himself.
2	"Episode 2"	Sheree Folkson	Russell T Davies	20 March 2005
While living on his wits and as a mystic, he does a good deed for Bragadin and comes into a fortune. Bragadin offers to adopt him and Henriette agrees to marry him. Grimani, enraged, has Casanova arrested and charged with witchcraft, but he escapes from prison. Casanova flees Venice, taking with him Giac (pronounced 'Jack'), his young illegitimate son by a previous liaison, and Rocco, his servant. He heads for Paris, as he knows that Venetian ambassadors abroad are able to grant pardons.
3	"Episode 3"	Sheree Folkson	Russell T Davies	27 March 2005
We follow the young Casanova's adventures in London - where he glimpses Henriette and tricks his way into court circles - and in Naples, where he meets an old friend. Still living on his wits, Casanova makes and loses fortunes and also enjoys other conquests. Back in the present, Edith realizes that Casanova is now very sick and nearing his end. Edith tells Casanova that Henriette, who had died six months previously, is coming to visit as Casanova slowly dies smiling. The episode closes with a scene of Henriette and Casanova dancing, together at last.

== Production ==
The series was originally commissioned from Davies by Executive Producer Julie Gardner when she was working at Granada-owned London Weekend Television. However, after Gardner moved on to become Head of Drama at BBC Wales in 2003, she commissioned Davies to write the drama for the BBC instead, as part of the deal that also saw him installed as the chief writer and Executive Producer of Doctor Who (in which Tennant later played the Doctor's tenth incarnation), also being overseen by Gardner and made at BBC Wales. It was Tennant's role as Giacomo that led to Davies casting him in Doctor Who as the Tenth Doctor.

It was aired in the United States in two parts, 8 and 15 October 2006, with the full unedited British version released on DVD the following week, 17 October 2006. The programme also aired in Australia on the ABC, again edited into two parts.

== Reception ==
The series was received warmly by critics on both sides of the Atlantic. In The New York Times, Anita Gates noted its "lively pace, a warm spirit, [and] contagious sense of fun." The Guardian agreed, saying that "It was all agreeably amoral, and the actors really looked as if they were enjoying the sex scenes, which is nice because they usually look as if they'd rather be lancing each other's boils."

== Home media ==
The serial was released on DVD in the UK in May 2005, and in the United States in October 2006.
