= Russell T Davies =

Welsh screenwriter and television producer (born 1963)

Russell T Davies OBE FRSL
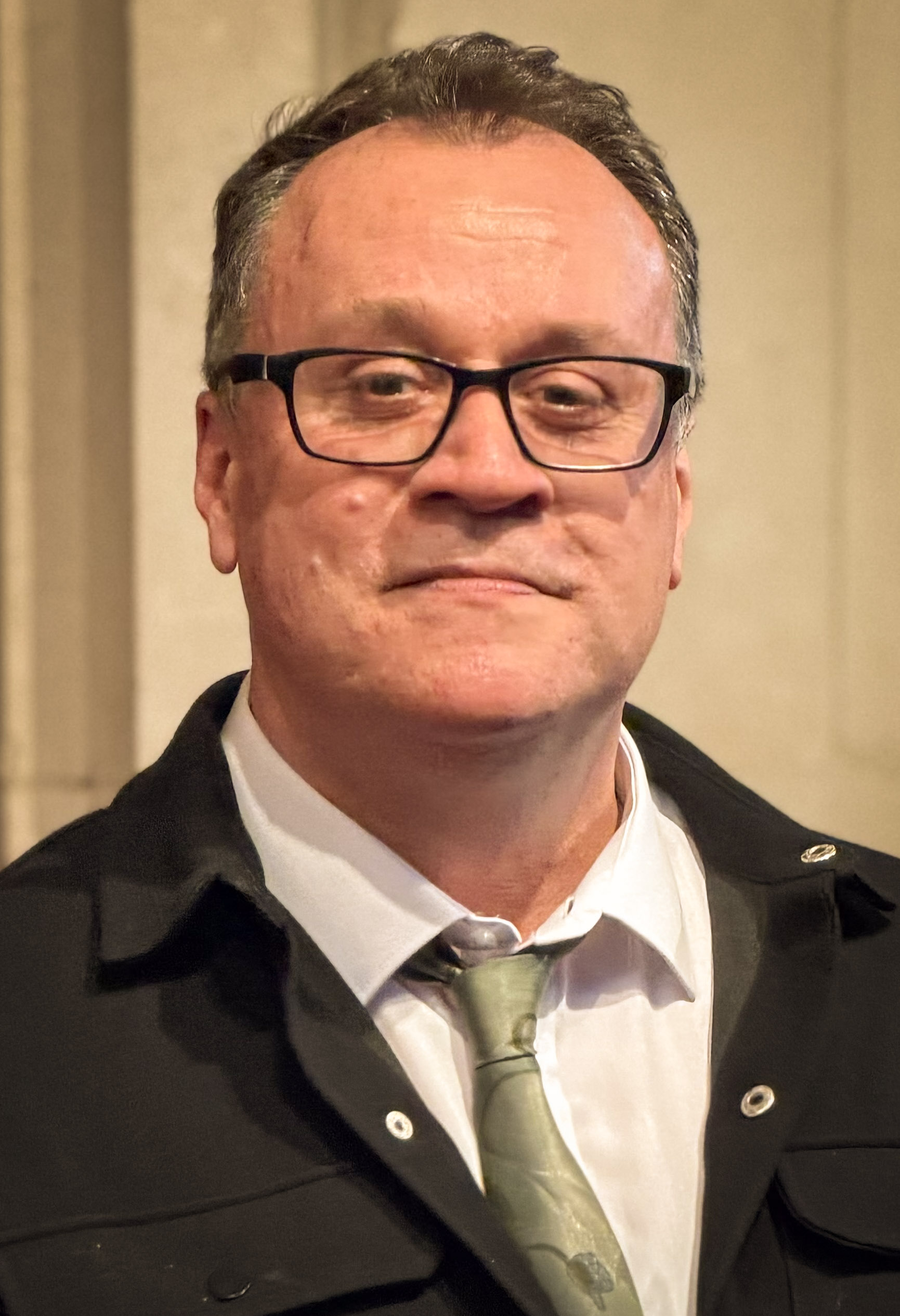
- Davies in 2025
- Born: Stephen Russell Davies; 27 April 1963 (age 63); Swansea, Wales
- Education: Worcester College, Oxford
- Occupations: Screenwriter; television producer
- Years active: 1986–present
- Notable work: Queer as Folk; Doctor Who; Torchwood; It's a Sin
- Spouse: Andrew Smith (m. 2012; died 2018)

Stephen Russell Davies (/ˈdeɪvɪs/ DAY-vis; born 27 April 1963), known professionally as Russell T Davies, is a Welsh screenwriter and television producer. He is best known for being the original showrunner and head writer of the revival of the BBC sci-fi series Doctor Who, from 2005 to 2010 and 2023 to 2025. His other notable works include creating the series Queer as Folk (1999–2000), Bob & Rose (2001), The Second Coming (2003), Casanova (2005), Doctor Who spin-offs Torchwood (2006–2011), The Sarah Jane Adventures (2007–2011), and The War Between the Land and the Sea (2025), Cucumber (2015), A Very English Scandal (2018), Years and Years (2019), It's a Sin (2021), Nolly (2023), and Tip Toe (2026).

Born in Swansea, Davies had aspirations as a comic artist before focusing on being a playwright and screenwriter. After graduating from Oxford University, he joined the BBC's children's department, CBBC, in 1985 on a part-time basis and held various positions, which included creating two series, Dark Season and Century Falls. He eventually left the BBC for Granada Television, and in 1994 began writing adult television drama. His early scripts generally explored concepts of religion and sexuality among various backdrops: Revelations was a soap opera about organised religion and featured a lesbian vicar; Springhill was a soap drama about a Catholic family in contemporary Liverpool; The Grand explored society's opinion of subjects such as prostitution, abortion and homosexuality during the interwar period; and Queer as Folk recreated his experiences in the Manchester gay scene. His work in the 2000s included Bob & Rose, which portrayed a gay man who fell in love with a woman; The Second Coming, which focused on the second coming and deicide of Jesus Christ from a mostly non-religious point of view; Mine All Mine, a comedy about a family who discover they own the entire city of Swansea; and his return to the BBC with BBC Three's Casanova (produced concurrently with the Doctor Who revival but broadcast first), an adaptation of the complete memoirs of Venetian adventurer Giacomo Casanova.

Following the show's sixteen-year hiatus, Davies revived and ran Doctor Who for the period between 2005 and 2010, with Christopher Eccleston and later David Tennant starring as the Doctor. Davies's tenure as executive producer of the show saw a surge in popularity which led to the production of two spin-off series, Torchwood and The Sarah Jane Adventures, and the revival of Saturday prime-time dramas as a profitable venture for production companies during the late 2000s and early 2010s. Davies was appointed Officer of the Order of the British Empire in 2008 for services to drama, which coincided with the announcement he would step down from Doctor Who as the show's executive producer with his final script, "The End of Time" (2009–2010). Davies moved to Los Angeles in 2009, where he oversaw production of Torchwood: Miracle Day and the fifth and final series of The Sarah Jane Adventures. After his partner developed cancer in late 2011, Davies returned to the UK. In September 2021, shortly before the filming of Chris Chibnall's era had wrapped, Davies was announced as returning Doctor Who showrunner; he ran the show from the period between 2023 and 2025, with Tennant and Ncuti Gatwa as the Doctor. Davies's second tenure included production of another spin-off show he created called The War Between the Land and the Sea.

In the 2010s Davies co-created the CBBC science fantasy drama Wizards vs Aliens, and created Cucumber, a Channel 4 series about middle-aged gay men in the Manchester gay scene; Banana, an E4 series about young LGBT people in the Cucumber universe; and Tofu, an All 4 documentary series which discussed LGBT issues. Davies's later work for BBC One in the 2010s include a television film adaptation of William Shakespeare's A Midsummer Night's Dream; A Very English Scandal, a miniseries adaptation of the 2016 novel A Very English Scandal; and Years and Years, a drama series which follows a Manchester family affected by political, economic, and technological changes to Britain over 15 years. Davies returned to Channel 4 for a third time in 2021 as creator of It's a Sin, a semi-autobiographical drama about the HIV/AIDS crisis of the 1980s and 1990s. Later in the 2020s he worked with former Red Production Company owner and longtime collaborator Nicola Shindler at Shindler's Quay Street Productions company on ITV's Nolly, a biographical miniseries about Crossroads soap opera star Noele Gordon, and Channel 4's Tip Toe, a miniseries about two next-door neighbours in Manchester feuding with each other during a time of anti-LGBTQ rhetoric in the 2020s.

== Early life ==
Stephen Russell Davies was born on 27 April 1963 at Mount Pleasant Hospital in Swansea. His father, Vivian Davies, and his mother, Barbara, were teachers. Davies was the youngest of three children and their only son. Because he was born by caesarean section, his mother was placed on a morphine drip and was institutionalised after an overdose resulted in a psychotic episode. He described his mother's experience as "literally ... like science fiction" and an early inspiration for his writing career. As a child, Davies was almost always referred to by his middle name. He grew up in a household that "never switched the TV off" until after closedown, and he subsequently became immersed in dramas such as I, Claudius and Doctor Who. One of his first memories, at the age of three, was the 1966 Doctor Who serial The Tenth Planet. He was also an avid cartoonist and comics enthusiast, and purchased series such as Asterix and Peanuts.

Davies attended Tycoch Primary School in Sketty in Swansea, and enrolled at Olchfa School aged 11. In his first year, the main school buildings were closed for rebuilding after inspectors discovered the high alumina cement used in construction had caused other public buildings to collapse. Lessons were instead held in portable buildings, which influenced Davies's imagination to create mystery, science-fiction, and conspiracy thriller stories about the main building. He also immersed himself in books such as Sons and Lovers by D. H. Lawrence and The Crystal Mouse by Babs Hodges Deal; the latter influenced him so much he could "see it echoing in anything" he wrote. At age 14, he auditioned for and joined the newly formed West Glamorgan Youth Theatre Company (WGYTC). The group's founder and director, Godfrey Evans, considered him to be "a total all-rounder" who was talented and popular with the other students. Working with the group allowed him to define his sexual identity, and he embarked on a several-month relationship with fellow youth actor Rhian Morgan. He later came out as homosexual in his teenage years.

In 1979, Davies completed his O-Levels and stayed at Olchfa with the ambition to study English literature at the University of Oxford; he abandoned his aspirations of becoming a comic artist after a careers advisor convinced him that his colour-blindness would make that path unlikely. During his studies, he participated in the WGYTC's assignments to create Welsh language drama to be performed at the National Eisteddfod of Wales; two such productions were Pair Dadeni, a play based on the Mabinogion myth cycle, and Perthyn, a drama about community belonging and identity in early-1980s West Glamorgan. In 1981, he was accepted by Worcester College, Oxford to study English literature. At Oxford, he realised he was enamoured with the narrative aspect of fiction, especially 19th-century literature such as that by Charles Dickens.

Davies continued to submit scripts to the WGYT during his studies at Oxford, including Box, a play about the influence of television which Evans noted contained Davies's penchants for misdirecting the audience and mixing comedy and drama; In Her Element, which centred on the animation of still objects; and Hothouse, an Alan Bennett-inspired piece about internal politics in an advertising office. In 1984, he made his final performance for the WGYT and signed up for a course in Theatre Studies at Cardiff University after he graduated from Oxford. He worked sporadically for the Sherman Theatre's publicity department and claimed unemployment benefit in the interim. In 1985, Davies began his professional television career after a friend suggested he should talk to a television producer who was seeking a temporary graphic artist for the children's show Why Don't You?.

== Children's television career (1985–1993) ==
Davies was taken as a member of the BBC Wales children's department (CBBC) in 1985 and given one-day contracts and commissions, such as illustrating for Why Don't You?. As he was only given three days of work per month by the BBC, he continued to freelance and volunteer for the Sherman Theatre. In 1986, he was approached by the Sunday Sport before its launch to provide a football-themed daily strip; he declined because he was concerned about the pornographic content of the newspaper. He submitted a script for Crossroads in response to an appeal for new writers; it was not used because the show was cancelled in 1987. He ultimately abandoned his graphic art career entirely when he realised in his early twenties that he enjoyed writing the dialogue of a comic more than creating the art.

On 1 June 1987, Davies made his first and only appearance as a television presenter on Play School alongside regular presenter Chloe Ashcroft. Why Don't You? line producer Peter Charlton suggested that he would "be good on camera" and advised him to take his career public. Davies was granted the opportunity for sporadic appearances over a period of six months; he hosted only one episode as a storytelling illustrator before he walked off the set and commented he was "not doing that again". The appearance remains an in-joke in the industry, and the recordings were invariably requested for wrap parties Davies attended.

On Why Don't You?, Davies held various jobs including: researcher, director, illustrator, assistant floor manager and unofficial publicist for fan-mail. He was offered his first professional scriptwriting job in 1986 by producer Dave Evans; he had entered Evans's office to collect his wages and was offered an extra £100 to write a replacement script. Davies's script was positively received by the CBBC and led to increasingly larger roles which culminated in a six-month contract to write for the show after it relocated to Manchester in 1988. He worked for the show for two more years and became the show's producer. He oversaw an increase in drama which tripled its audience—despite the fact BBC Manchester was not permitted by the corporation to create children's dramas—which reached its climax with his last episode: a drama where the Why Don't You? protagonists, led by the show's longest running presenter Ben Slade, were trapped in a café by a supercomputer which tried to kill them.

While producing Why Don't You?, Davies branched out within CBBC at BBC Manchester: he attended directors' courses; wrote for older audiences with his contributions to DEF II and On the Waterfront; and accompanied Keith Chegwin to Norway to assist in the production of a children's documentary about politics. The head of CBBC, Ed Pugh, offered him the chance to produce Breakfast Serials, a new series scheduled for an 8:00 am slot. Breakfast Serials incorporated elements of non-sequitur comedy and popular culture references aimed at older children, such as a parody of Land of the Giants. He decided to leave CBBC during the production of Breakfast Serials: a friend called him after the first episode was transmitted and observed he had "broadcast a joke about the juvenilia of Emily Brontë at eight o'clock in the morning"; the conversation caused him to reflect he was writing for the wrong audience. Davies worked as a writer on three more children's series while he pursued an adult drama career, creating Dark Season and Century Falls, and writing for Children's Ward.

=== Dark Season and Century Falls ===
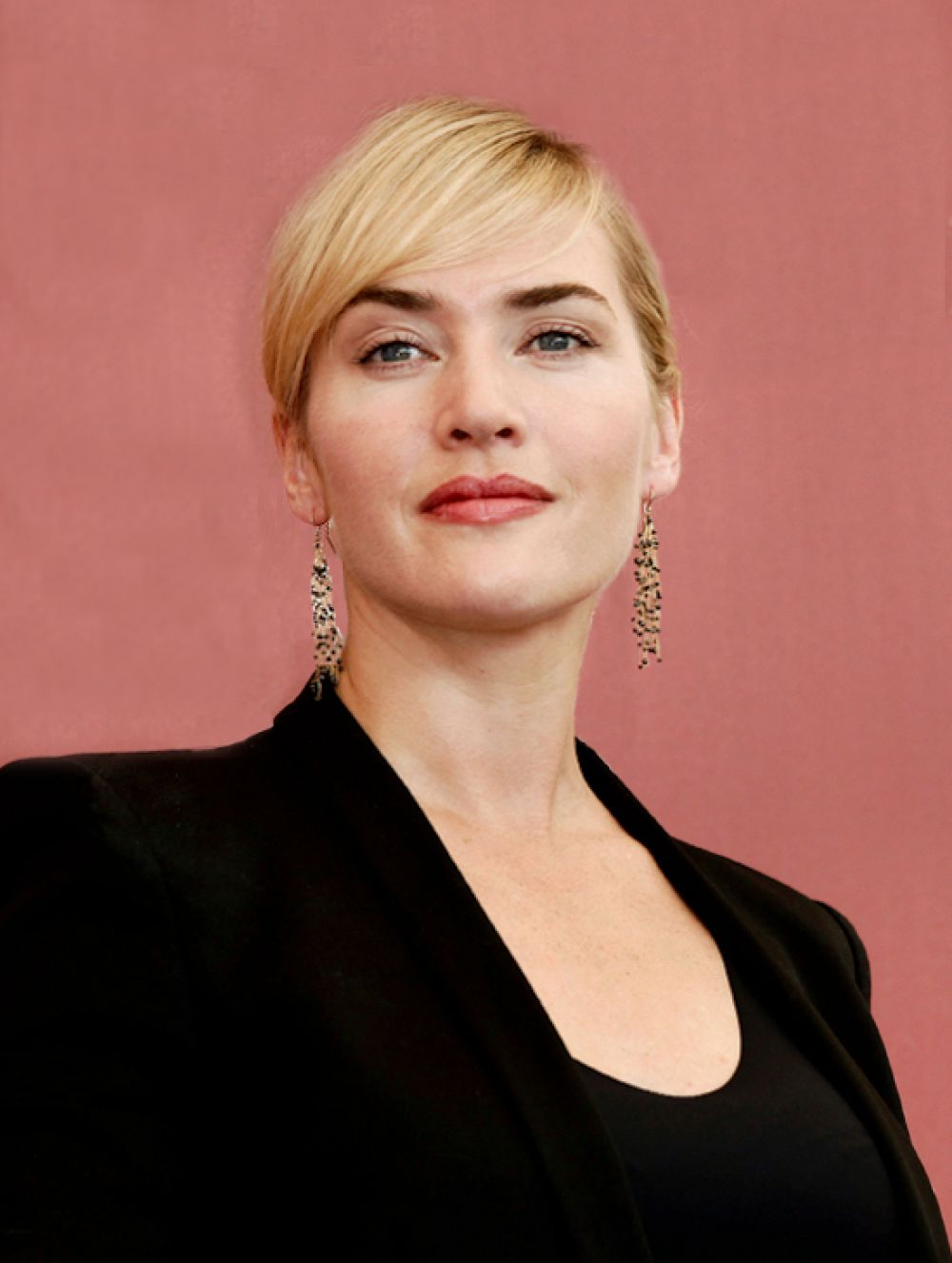
Dark Season was a breakthrough role for actress Kate Winslet.

During his tenure on Why Don't You?, Davies oversaw the production of a story that took place in Loch Ness. The story was the precursor for his first freelance children's project: Dark Season. The show, originally called The Adventuresome Three, would feature the Why Don't You? characters in a purely dramatic setting influenced by his childhood. He submitted the script to the head of CBBC, Anna Home, and Granada Television. Both companies were interested in producing the show with minor changes: Granada wished to produce it as one six-part serial, as opposed to Davies's plan of two three-part serials; and Home was interested in accepting the show on the condition it included a new cast of characters. He accepted Home's offer, and the show was allocated the budget and timeslot of Maid Marian and her Merry Men, which had been put on hiatus the year before.

The first three episodes of Dark Season feature three young teenagers in a contemporary secondary school, Reet (Kate Winslet), Marcie (Victoria Lambert), and Tom (Ben Chandler), who discover a plot by the villain Mr Eldritch (Grant Parsons) to take over the world using school computers. Eldritch is eventually defeated by Marcie and the computer expert Professor Polzinsky (Rosalie Crutchley). The next three episodes focus on a new villain: the archaeologist Miss Pendragon (Jacqueline Pearce), later described by Davies as a "devil worshipping Nazi lesbian", who becomes a part of the ancient supercomputer Behemoth. The two distinct plot elements converge at the end of the fifth episode, when Pendragon crashes through the school stage as Eldritch walks into the auditorium.

Dark Season uses concepts seen in his tenure as executive producer of Doctor Who: "School Reunion", written by Toby Whithouse, shares its concept of the antagonist using computers in a comprehensive school to take over the world; "Army of Ghosts" unexpectedly brings together the series' two major villains for the final episode; and the characters of Marcie and her friends are similar, albeit unintentionally, to the structure of the Doctor and their companions. Dark Season was the first series he was credited as "Russell T Davies"—the initial arbitrarily chosen to distinguish himself from the BBC Radio 4 presenter—and the first series he was commissioned to write a novelisation: it features a more ambiguous climax and foreshadows a sequel set in an arcade similar to the one featured in The Sarah Jane Adventures serial, Warriors of Kudlak.

Davies started planning a second series for Dark Season, which followed a similar structure. The first half of the series would take part in the arcade mentioned in the novelisation, and the second would feature the appearance of psychic twins and the re-emergence of the villain Eldritch. The concepts were transferred to its spiritual successor, Century Falls, which was produced in 1993 at the request of Dark Season director Colin Cant. The series primarily used the "psychic twins" concept and was set in an isolated village based on those in the Yorkshire Dales and the North York Moors.

The plot of Century Falls is driven by a legend that no children had been born in the eponymous village for more than forty years. The protagonist, Tess Hunter (Catherine Sanderson), is an overweight teenager who moves to the village with her mother at the beginning of the serial. She quickly befriends the psychic Ben Naismith (Simon Fenton) and his twin sister Carey (Emma Jane Lavin). The three teenagers examine the waterfall that gave Ben his powers and the disaster which caused the legendary infertility. The serial climaxes in a confrontation between Tess and the deity Century, who is attempting to fuse with Tess's unborn sister.

Century Falls is conceptually much darker than its predecessor Dark Season and his later work, which Davies attributed to a trend that inexperienced writers "get off on the dark stuff": In a BAFTA interview with Davies, Home recalled she "very nearly got into trouble because it did actually push at the boundaries which some of the powers-that-be would rather not have been pushed". The series offered a sense of realism in its protagonist, who is not heroic and aspirational, has poor social skills, and is bluntly described by Ben as a "fat girl". Century Falls was the last script he wrote for CBBC for fourteen years. He had begun to formulate another successor: The Heat of the Sun, a series set over Christmas 1999 and New Year's Day 2000 that would have included the concepts of psychic powers and world domination.

=== Children's Ward ===
While he was writing Dark Season and Century Falls, Davies sought freelance projects elsewhere; these included three scripts for the BBC children's comedy ChuckleVision. One venture in 1991 led him to Granada Television, where he edited scripts for the ITV children's medical drama Children's Ward under the supervision of eventual Coronation Street producer Tony Wood and his former boss Ed Pugh. By 1992, he had been promoted to producer and oversaw an increase in discussion of larger contemporary issues. In 1993, he wrote a script about a teenage boy who had been infected with HIV via a blood transfusion, which challenged the prevalent assumption only gay people contracted HIV:

Jason Lloyd
You must be a poof if you've got AIDS.
Richard Higgs
I'm not gay, and I haven't got AIDS; I'm HIV positive. But just for the sake of an argument let's say I was homosexual. Would it matter? What difference would it make?
Jason
[You'd] fancy me, wouldn't you?
Richard
There's not a boy, girl, man, or woman alive who could possibly fancy you. Look around. Where's this queue of people dying to ask you out? They don't exist, Jason, because you're stupid, you're bigoted, and you don't matter one little bit.

— Children's Ward, written by Russell T Davies, 1993

Davies left the role of producer in 1994, but continued to write occasionally for the series. Notably, he was requested to write the 100th episode of the series, by then called The Ward, which aired in October 1996. Instead of celebrating the milestone, he wrote a script about a recently emerging threat: paedophiles in online chat-rooms. The episode was about an X-Files fan who was drawn in by a paedophile's offer of a rare magazine. In the dénouement of the episode, the child recounts the tale of his near abduction and describes his attacker as "just a man like any other man". The episode earned Davies his first Children's BAFTA award for Best Drama.

== Adult television career (1994–2004) ==
During his production tenure on Children's Ward, Davies continued to seek other freelance writing jobs, particularly for soap operas; his intention was to eventually work on the popular and long-running Granada soap Coronation Street. In pursuit of this career plan, he storylined soaps such as Families and wrote scripts for shows such as Cluedo, a game show based on the board game Cluedo, and Do the Right Thing, a localised version of the Brazilian panel show Você Decide with Terry Wogan as presenter and Frank Skinner as a regular panellist. One writing job, for The House of Windsor, a soap opera about footmen in Buckingham Palace, was so poorly received his other scripts for the show would be written under the pseudonym Leo Vaughn.

In 1994, Davies relinquished all of his producing jobs, and was offered a scriptwriting role on the late-night soap opera Revelations, created by him, Tony Wood, and Brian B. Thompson. The series was a tongue-in-cheek deconstruction of organised religion, and featured his first overtly homosexual character: a lesbian vicar portrayed by Sue Holderness, who came out of the closet in a two-hander episode with Carole Nimmons.

Davies attributes the revelation about Holderness's character as a consequence of both the "pressure cooker nature" of the show and the recent ordination of female vicars in the Church of England. He let his contract with Granada expire and pitched a new early-evening soap opera to Channel 4, RU, with its creator Bill Moffat, Sandra Hastie, a producer on Moffat's previous series Press Gang, and co-writer Paul Cornell. Although the slot was eventually taken by Hollyoaks, he and Cornell mutually benefited from the pitch: Davies introduced Cornell to the Children's Ward producers and established contact with Moffat's son Steven, and Cornell introduced Davies to Virgin Publishing. Davies wrote one Doctor Who Virgin New Adventures novel, Damaged Goods, in which the Doctor tracks a Class A drug tainted by Time Lord technology across several galaxies. The book includes several themes which Davies would intersperse in his later works—including a family called "Tyler" and companion Chris Cwej participating in casual homosexual sex— and a subplot formed the inspiration for The Mother War, a proposed but never produced thriller for Granada about a woman, Eva Jericho, and a calcified foetus in her uterus.

Davies continued to propose dramas to Channel 4. The next drama to be commissioned was Springhill, an apocalyptic soap-opera, co-created by Frank Cottrell Boyce and Paul Abbott, which aired simultaneously on Sky One and Channel 4 in 1996–97. Set in suburban Liverpool, the series focuses on the devoutly Catholic Freeman family and their encounter and conflict with Eva Morrigan (Katharine Rogers). He storylined for the second series, but submitted fewer scripts; Granada had commissioned him to write for their soap The Grand, temporarily storyline for Coronation Street, and write the straight-to-video special, Coronation Street: Viva Las Vegas!. The second series of Springhill continued his penchant for symbolism; in particular, it depicted Marion Freeman (Judy Holt) and Eva as personifications of good and evil, and climaxed with a finale set in an ultra-liberal dystopian future where premarital sex and homosexuality are embraced by the Church. Boyce later commented that without Davies's input, the show would have been a "dry run" for Abbott's hit show Shameless.

=== The Grand ===
Davies's next project was The Grand, a period soap drama set in a Manchester hotel during the interwar period. It was designed to be a valuable show in a ratings war with the BBC and was scheduled at 9 pm on a Friday night. After the original writer abandoned the series, Granada approached him to write the entire show. His scripts for the first series reflect the pessimism of the period; each episode added its own emotional trauma on the staff; these included a soldier's execution for desertion, a destitute maid who threatened to illegally abort her unborn child to survive, and a multi-episode about the chambermaid, Monica Jones (Jane Danson), who kills her rapist in self-defence, is arrested, and eventually hanged for murder. The show was renewed for a second series despite the first's dark tone.

The second series had a lighter tone and greater emphasis on character development, which Davies attributed to his friend Sally, who had previously warned him of the adult humour in Breakfast Serials; she told him his show was too bleak to be compared to real life. He highlighted the sixth and eighth episodes of the second series as a time of maturity as a writer: for the sixth, he utilised then-unconventional narrative devices such as flashbacks to explore the hotel barman's closeted homosexuality and the societal attitudes towards sexuality in the 1920s; and he highlighted the eighth as when he allowed the series to "take on its own life" by deliberately inserting plot devices such as McGuffins to enhance the comic relief of the series.

Although well received, the series' ratings were not high enough to warrant a third series. After its cancellation in September 1997, Davies had an existential crisis after almost dying from an accidental overdose; the experience persuaded him to detoxify and make a name for himself by producing a series which celebrated his homosexuality.

=== Queer as Folk ===
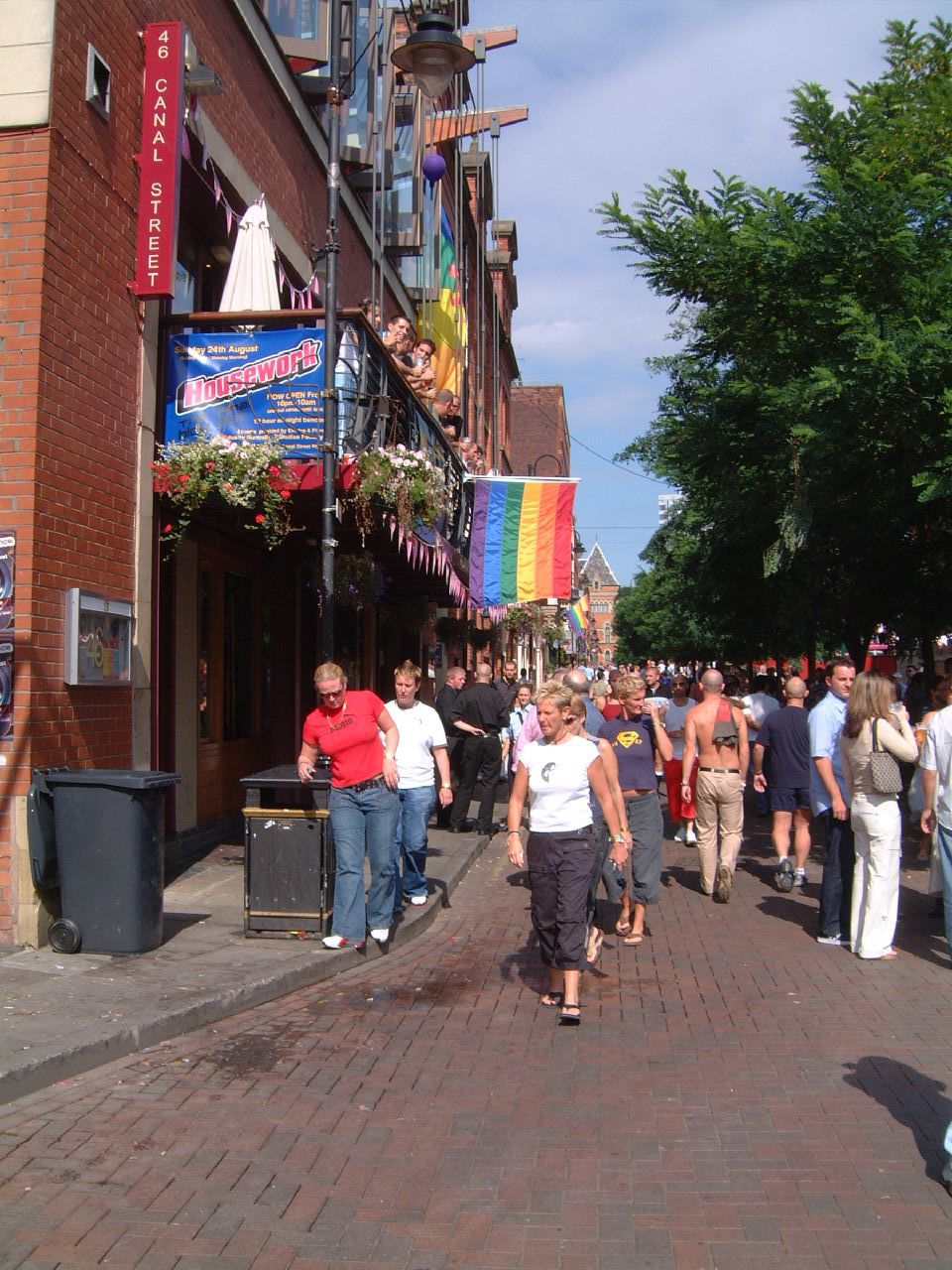
Manchester's gay district on Canal Street was a major source of inspiration for Queer as Folk and, later, Bob & Rose.

After his near-death experience, Davies started to develop a series for Channel 4 which reflected the "hedonistic lifestyle" of the gay quarter of Manchester he was leaving behind. Encouraged by ex-Granada executives Catriona MacKenzie and Gub Neil to "go gay", the series focused on a group of friends in Manchester's gay scene, tentatively titled The Other End of the Ballroom, and later, Queer as Fuck.

By February 1998, when he completed the first draft for the series première, the series was known under its eventual title Queer as Folk. The series emulates dramas such as Band of Gold in presenting realistic discussion on sexuality, as opposed to "one-sided" gay characters in soap operas such as EastEnders, and eschews "heavy-handed discussion" of issues such as HIV; the show instead focuses on the party scene on Canal Street.

After he wrote the pilot, he approached actors for the main characters. Christopher Eccleston was Davies's first choice for the role of Stuart Jones; Eccleston declined because of his age and suggested his friend Aidan Gillen instead. The roles of Vince Tyler and Nathan Maloney were given to Craig Kelly and Charlie Hunnam, and the secondary character Alexander Perry, originally written for the television producer Phil Collinson during his brief acting career, was portrayed by Antony Cotton, who later played the gay character Sean Tully in Coronation Street. The series was allocated a £3 million budget, and was produced by Red Productions, then owned by his friend and former colleague Nicola Shindler, (Note: Shindler left Red Productions in 2020, but continued to collaborate with Davies at Shindler's next production company Quay Street Productions, launched the following year.) and filmed by director Charles McDougall and Sarah Hardin on location in Manchester. The eight 40-minute episodes emulated experiences from his social life and includes an episode where the minor character Phil Delaney (Jason Merrells) dies of a cocaine overdose, unnoticed by his social circle.

The series was aired in early 1999, when Parliament were discussing LGBT equality; the series première aired on the day the House of Lords was discussing the Sexual Offences Bill 1999, which eventually reduced the age of consent for homosexual couples to 16. The première was controversial, in particular because it depicted the character Nathan, aged 15, in sexual intercourse with an older man; the broadcasting watchdog Ofcom received 136 complaints and the series received criticism from Hunnam's parents and from activist Mary Whitehouse. The controversy was amplified when the sponsor Beck's withdrew after several episodes and homosexual activists complained the series was not representative of gay culture. Nevertheless, the show garnered 3.5 million viewers per episode and a generally positive reaction from fans, and was renewed for a two-episode special due for the following year.

Queer as Folk 2 was broadcast in 2000 and was driven by the plot element of Vince's half-sister's wedding. The specials place emphasis on Vince and Stuart's relationship, and ends with their departure for another gay scene in a pastiche of Grease, as Nathan took the role as the leader of the Manchester scene's next generation. The show ended on 22 February 2000. On the heels of the special, Davies pitched the spin-off Misfits, a late-night soap opera set in a boarding house owned by Vince's mother, Hazel, and The Second Coming, a series which depicted the Second Coming of Christ in contemporary Manchester. Misfits was rejected in December 2000 and The Second Coming was initially approved by Channel 4 but later rejected after a change of executive personnel. Instead of contesting the cancellation of The Second Coming, he left Channel 4 and vowed to not work with them again until Cucumber and Banana were commissioned in 2013.

=== Bob and Rose ===
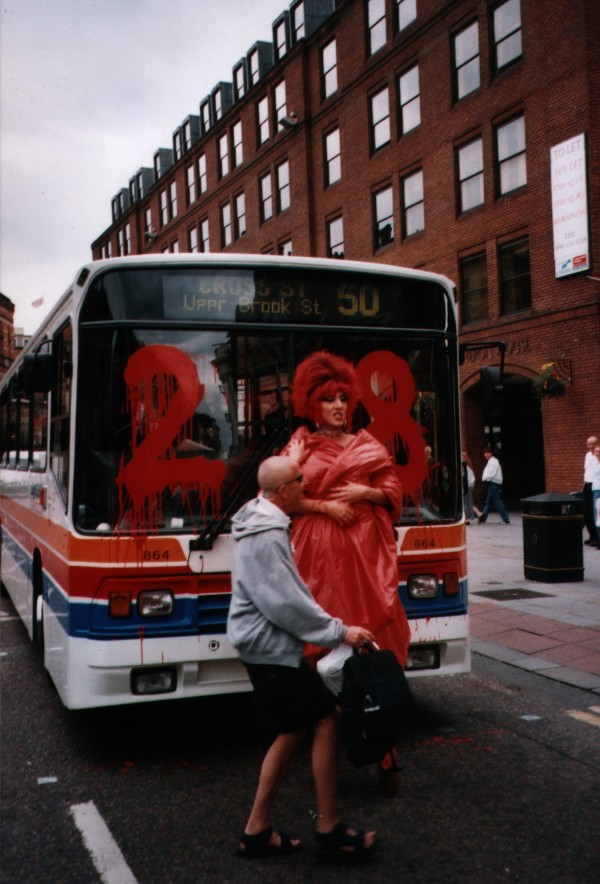
LGBT rights protests in the 1990s and early 2000s, specifically those against Section 28, were a large influence on Bob & Rose; a climactic scene in the fourth episode (left) mirrors and was inspired by protests against the transport company Stagecoach (right, in Manchester in 2000).

Shindler continued to pitch The Second Coming to other television networks while Davies sought other ventures. His next series was based on a gay friend who married a woman and fathered a child. He saw the relationship as a promising concept for an unconventional love story and asked the couple about their relationship to develop the show. After he developed the series around the prejudice he and his gay friends had shown, he realised he was creating caricatures for the purpose of exposing them, and instead focused on telling a traditional love story and gave the couple the traditionally British names of Bob Gossage and Rose Cooper.

To simulate a classic love story, the plot required antagonists, in the form of Bob's best friend and fellow teacher Holly Vance and Rose's boyfriend Andy Lewis (Daniel Ryan). While Andy, named after Davies's boyfriend Andrew Smith, was a minor character and departed in the third episode, Holly featured throughout the entirety of the series. Bob & Rose thus followed a similar format to Queer as Folk, in particular, the triumvirate of main characters composed of a couple and an outsider who lived in contemporary Manchester, and inverted the traditional "coming out" story by focusing on Bob's uncharacteristic attraction to Rose; Bob describes his sexual life by simply speaking the line "I fancy men. And her." The series was similar to the Kevin Smith film Chasing Amy (1997), as they both portrayed a romance between a straight character and gay character and the resulting ostracism from the couple's social circles, much like The Second Coming shared its concept with Smith's 1999 film Dogma.

Like Queer as Folk, Bob & Rose contributed to the contemporary political debate around LGBT rights: a subplot involves the fictional pressure group Parents Against Homophobia (PAH), led by Bob's mother Monica (Penelope Wilton), an ardent gay rights activist, and their campaign to repeal Section 28 of the Local Government Act 1988, which prohibited local authorities from "intentionally promot[ing]" homosexuality. The subplot climaxes in the fourth episode, when Monica and Bob lead a rally into direct action by handcuffing themselves to a bus run by a company whose management donated millions to keeping the law on the books; the scene directly parallels protests against the transport company Stagecoach due to their founder Brian Souter's financial and political support of Section 28—at one point, Davies intended to explicitly name Stagecoach in the script— and is inspired by earlier protests undertaken by the LGBT rights pressure group OutRage!.

After successfully pitching the show to ITV, Red Productions joined Davies in casting the show and initially approached Jonathan Creek star Alan Davies to portray Bob. Although he was not gay, Davies accepted the role and spent several weeks researching first-hand Manchester's gay scene with series director Joe Wright. His only objection to the role was Bob being a fan of Manchester United F.C., the team Shindler had named Red Productions for, because of his prolific support of Arsenal F.C. The part of Rose was given to Lesley Sharp, her first leading role after her portrayal of secondary characters in past Red shows Playing the Field and Clocking Off, and Jessica Stevenson was cast as Holly by ITV Head of Drama Nick Elliott on the basis of her performance in the Channel 4 comedy Spaced.

The series was filmed in the southern suburbs of Manchester between March and June 2001 and often used Davies's own home as a green room. At the time, the series was the only Red–Davies collaboration not to be scored by future Doctor Who composer Murray Gold; (Note: Later followed by Ben Foster's score of Banana, 14 years later.) the soundtrack was a Martin Phipps composition inspired by Hans Zimmer's work on the 1993 film True Romance. It aired on Monday nights in September and October 2001. Critically acclaimed, the series won two British Comedy Awards, and received a nomination at the British Academy Television Awards. However, the series had lower viewership than expected and was moved to a later timeslot for the final two episodes. Although the series was not as successful as he hoped, the show helped Davies rekindle his relationship with his mother shortly before her death, just after the transmission of the fourth episode, which he sees as "possibly the best thing [he has] ever written".

=== The Second Coming ===
Shortly after the transmission of Bob & Rose, Davies was approached by Abbott to write for his new BBC show Linda Green. He accepted the offer and wrote an episode where the titular character (Liza Tarbuck) and her friends attend a schoolmate's funeral and become psychologically haunted by the deceased woman's solitary life. His first work for the BBC in eight years prompted them to approach him with additional concepts for period dramas, which he invariably declined as his sole intent was to revive Doctor Who, which had then been on hiatus for over a decade.

In 2002, he met with the BBC to discuss the revival of the show and producing The Second Coming; the BBC were unable to commit to either, and he again declined to work for them. After the BBC rejected The Second Coming, Shindler proposed the series should be pitched to ITV. Despite the story's controversial message, the critical success of Bob & Rose encouraged the channel to commission the series for broadcast.

The Second Coming had been several years in the making and endured many rewrites from the first draft presented to Channel 4 in 2000, but retained its key concept of a depiction of the Second Coming of Christ with a humanity-centred deity. A major removal from the script, due to time constraints, was a long sequence titled "Night of the Demons": the main character, a shop assistant, Stephen Baxter, who discovers his divine lineage, takes over a hotel with his disciples and eventually encounters several of the hotel's employees which had been possessed by the Devil. Several similar sequences were removed to create a thriller set in the days before Judgement Day.

An experienced actor was required to portray Stephen; Davies approached Christopher Eccleston, who had previously been approached for the role of Stuart in Queer as Folk, based on his performance as Nicky Hutchinson in the drama Our Friends in the North. Eccleston accepted the role and helped Davies make the character more human after he observed "Baxter was getting lost amid his loftier pronouncements". The character of Judith, who would represent the fall of God, was given to Lesley Sharp after her performance in Bob & Rose, and the role of the Devil was given to Mark Benton.

The Second Coming was controversial from its conception. When it was a Channel 4 project, it was the subject of a Sunday Express article a year before its original projected transmission date of late 2001. The series would again receive criticism when it was rumoured it would be broadcast over the Easter weekend of 2003. The series was eventually broadcast over consecutive nights on 9–10 February 2003 to 6.3 million and 5.4 million viewers, respectively, and received mixed reactions from the audience: Davies reportedly received death threats for its atheistic message and criticism for its anticlimactic ending, as well as two nominations for Television Awards and one for a Royal Television Society Programme Award.

=== Mine All Mine ===
In the time near his mother's death, Davies returned to Swansea several times and reflected on the role of family. During one visit, he realised he had not yet written a series set in Wales; hence, he created a series about a family who discovers they own the entire city of Swansea. The Vivaldi Inheritance, later renamed Mine All Mine, was based on the tale of the Welsh pirate Robert Edwards and his descendants' claim to 77 acres (310,000 m^{2}) of real estate in Lower Manhattan, New York City. The series was a departure from his trend of experimental social commentary; it was instead designed to be a mainstream comedy which used Welsh actors: Davies and Red Productions even planned a cameo appearance by Academy Award-winning Swansea-born Catherine Zeta-Jones.

Because the series was centred on an entire family, Red Productions was given the task of casting eleven principal characters: the role of family patriarch Max Vivaldi was given to Griff Rhys Jones, at the request of ITV for prolific actors; Rhian Morgan, Davies's ex-girlfriend from the WGYT, was cast as Max's wife Val; Sharon Morgan as Max's sister Stella; Joanna Page as Candy Vivaldi; Matthew Barry and Siwan Morris as the Vivaldi siblings Leo and Maria; Hi-de-Hi! actress Ruth Madoc as Val's sister Myrtle Jones; and Jason Hughes as Maria's boyfriend Gethin. The series, specifically the family's composition of two daughters and a gay son, mirrored his own upbringing to the point where Davies and his boyfriend referred to the show as "The Private Joke".

The series was originally written in six parts, but Davies excised a large portion of the fifth episode because the crew expressed concerns with its pacing. The series was filmed in late 2003 under the direction of Sheree Folkson and Tim Whitby, and used many areas of Swansea which Davies was familiar with since his childhood. It aired as four-hour-long episodes and a ninety-minute finale on Thursday nights preceding Christmas 2003. Eventually, Mine All Mine would be his least successful series and ended its run with just over two million viewers, which he later blamed on the series' high eccentricity.

=== Casanova ===
Shortly after the transmission of Mine All Mine, the BBC commissioned Davies to produce the revival of Doctor Who, which completed his decade-long quest to return the series to the airwaves. At the time, he was developing two scripts: the first, a cinematic adaptation of the Charles Ingram Who Wants to Be a Millionaire? scandal, was cancelled after he accepted the Doctor Who job; and the second, a dramatisation of the life of the Venetian adventurer and lover Giacomo Casanova, was his next show with Red Productions.

Davies's association with Casanova began when London Weekend Television producers Julie Gardner, Michele Buck, and Damien Timmer approached him to write a 21st-century adaptation of Casanova's memoirs. He accepted to script the series because it was "the best subject in the world" and, after reading the memoirs, sought to create a realistic depiction of Casanova instead of further perpetuating the stereotype of a hypersexual lover. The series was originally written for ITV, but was turned down after he could not agree on the length of the serial. Shortly after ITV declined to produce Casanova, Gardner took up a position as Head of Drama at BBC Wales and brought the concept with her. The BBC agreed to fund the series, but could only release the money required if a regionally based independent company produced the series. Davies turned to Shindler, who agreed to become the serial's fifth executive producer.

Davies's script takes place in two distinct time frames and required two different actors for the eponymous role: the older Casanova was portrayed by Peter O'Toole, and the younger Casanova was portrayed by David Tennant. The serial takes place primarily during Casanova's early adulthood and depicts his life among three women: his mother (Dervla Kirwan), his lover Henriette (Laura Fraser), and his consort Bellino (Nina Sosanya). The script takes a different approach to Dennis Potter's 1971 dramatisation; instead of Potter's focus on sex and misogyny, the 2005 serial focuses on Casanova's compassion and respect for women.

Casanova was filmed alongside the first few episodes of the new series of Doctor Who, which meant producers common to both projects, including Davies and Gardner, made daily journeys between the former's production in Lancashire and Cheshire and the latter's production in Cardiff. Red Productions also filmed on location overseas in a stately home in Dubrovnik, and alongside production of the identically titled 2005 Lasse Hallström film in Venice. The two production teams shared resources and were given the unofficial names of "Little Casanova" and "Big Casanova" respectively. When it premièred on BBC Three in March 2005, the first episode attracted 940,000 viewers, a record for a first-run drama on the channel, but was overshadowed on BBC One by the return of Doctor Who in the same month.

== First Doctor Who era (2005–2010) ==
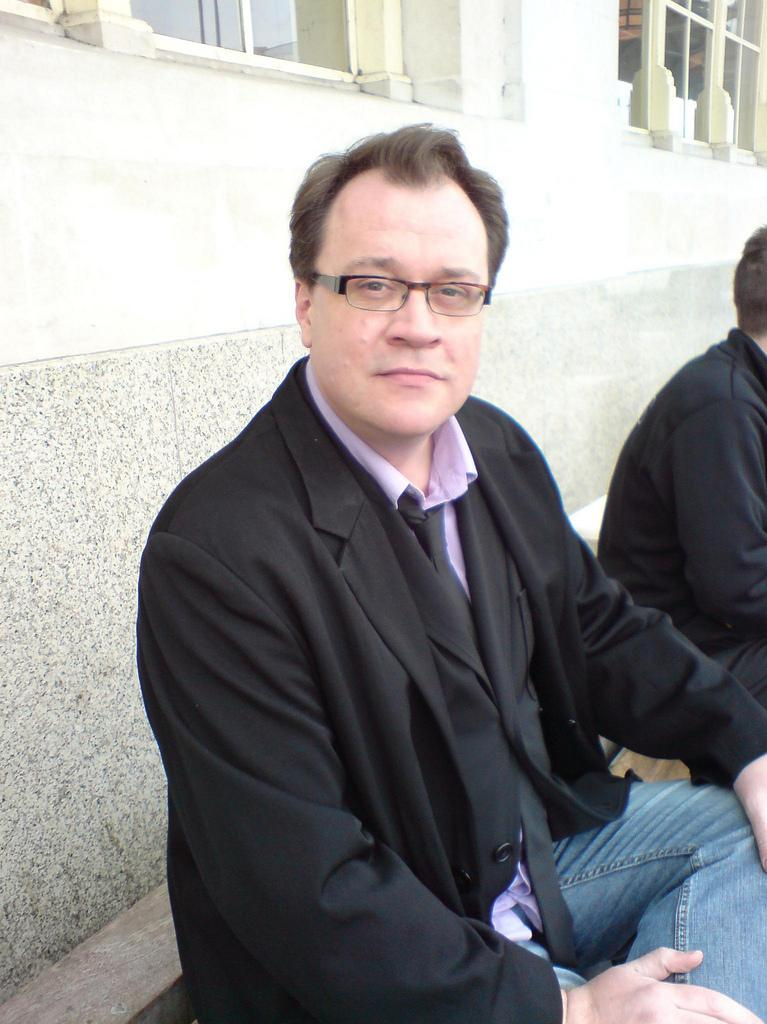
Davies in 2008

Since watching the First Doctor's (William Hartnell) regeneration into the Second Doctor (Patrick Troughton) at the end of the 1966 serial The Tenth Planet, Davies had "fallen in love" with the show and, by the mid-1970s, he was regularly writing reviews of broadcast serials in his diary. His favourite writer and childhood hero was Robert Holmes; during his career, he has complimented the creative use of BBC studios to create "terror and claustrophobia" for Holmes's 1975 script The Ark in Space—his favourite serial from the original series—and has opined that the first episode of The Talons of Weng-Chiang (1977) featured "the best dialogue ever written; it's up there with Dennis Potter". His screenwriting career also began with a Doctor Who submission, a spec script which he claimed was rejected by script editor Andrew Cartmel (1987–89), who suggested that he should write a more prosaic story about "a man who is worried about his mortgage, his marriage, [and] his dog". He initially claimed the script was similar to what was transmitted as "The Long Game" in 2005. In 2020 he tweeted that he was mistaken, sharing photographs of a spec script from 1986 called Mind of the Hodiac.

During the late 1990s, Davies lobbied the BBC to revive the show from its hiatus and reached the discussion stages in late 1998 and early 2002. His proposals would update the show to be better suited for a 21st-century audience: the series would be recorded on film instead of videotape; the length of each episode would double from twenty-five minutes to fifty; episodes would primarily take place on Earth, in the style of the Third Doctor (Jon Pertwee) UNIT episodes; and Davies would remove "excess baggage" from the mythology such as Gallifrey and the Time Lords. Davies's pitch competed against Dan Freedman's proposed retool as a fantasy series, Matthew Graham's gothic horror-styled reboot, and the Mark Gatiss—Gareth Roberts—Clayton Hickman pitch which made the Doctor the audience surrogate character, instead of his companions. Davies also took cues from American fantasy television series such as Buffy the Vampire Slayer and Smallville, most notably Buffy's concepts of series-long story arcs and the "Big Bad". Ultimately, with the exception of select shots including a slow-motion martial arts sequence, Doctor Who was not filmed on 16mm or 35mm film, and initially Davies's revival was shot on Digital Betacam.

In August 2003, the BBC had resolved the legal confusion over production rights which had surfaced as a result of the jointly produced Universal Studios–BBC–20th Century Fox 1996 Doctor Who film, and the Controller of BBC One Lorraine Heggessey and Controller of Drama Commissioning Jane Tranter approached Gardner and Davies to create a revival of the series to air in a primetime slot on Saturday nights, as part of their plan to devolve production to its regional bases. By mid-September, they accepted the deal to produce the series alongside Casanova.

Davies's pitch for Doctor Who was the first one he wrote voluntarily; previously, he opted to outline concepts of shows to commissioning executives and offer to write the pilot episode because he felt a pitch made him "feel like [he's] killing the work". The fifteen-page pitch outlined a Doctor who was "your best friend; someone you want to be with all the time", the 19-year-old Rose Tyler (Billie Piper) as a "perfect match" for the new Doctor, avoidance of the 40-year back story "except for the good bits", the retention of the TARDIS, sonic screwdriver, and Daleks, removal of the Time Lords, and a greater focus on humanity. His pitch was submitted for the first production meeting in December 2003 and a series of thirteen episodes was obtained by pressure from BBC Worldwide and a workable budget from Julie Gardner.

The first new series of Doctor Who featured eight scripts by Davies; the remainder were allocated to experienced dramatists and writers for the show's ancillary releases: Steven Moffat penned a two-episode story, and Mark Gatiss, Robert Shearman, and Paul Cornell each wrote one script. Davies also approached his old friend Paul Abbott and Harry Potter author J. K. Rowling to write for the series; both declined due to existing commitments. Shortly after he secured writers for the show, Davies stated he had no intention of approaching writers from the old series; the only writer he would have wished to work with was Holmes, who died in May 1986.

By early 2004, the show had settled into a regular production cycle. Davies, Gardner, and BBC Controller of Continuing Drama Series Mal Young took posts as executive producers, and Phil Collinson, his old colleague from Granada, took the role of producer. Davies's official position as showrunner combined the roles of head writer and executive producer and consisted of laying a skeletal plot for the entire series, holding "tone meetings" to correctly identify the tone of an episode, often described in one word—for example, the "tone word" for Moffat's "The Empty Child" was "romantic"—and overseeing all aspects of production.

The production team was also tasked with finding a suitable actor for the role of the Doctor. Most notably, they approached film actor Hugh Grant and comedian Rowan Atkinson for the role. By the time Young suggested The Second Coming and Our Friends in the North actor Christopher Eccleston to Davies, Eccleston was one of three left in the running for the role: the other candidates are rumoured to have been Alan Davies and Bill Nighy. Eccleston created his own characteristics of his rendition of the Doctor based on Davies's life, most notably, his catchphrase "Fantastic!":

[The central message of the show is] seize life, it's brief, enjoy it. The Doctor is always saying "isn't it fantastic?", which is one of Russell's favourite words. "Look at that blue alien, isn't it fantastic? Oh, it's trying to kill me. Never mind, let's solve it."

— Christopher Eccleston

The show started filming in July 2004 on location in Cardiff for "Rose". The start of filming created stress among the production team because of unseen circumstances: several scenes from the first block had to be re-shot because the original footage was unusable; the Slitheen prosthetics for "Aliens of London", "World War Three", and "Boom Town" were noticeably different from their computer-generated counterparts; and the BBC came to a gridlock in negotiations with the Terry Nation estate to secure the Daleks for the sixth episode of the series; Davies and episode writer Rob Shearman were forced to rework the script to feature another race, until Gardner was able to secure the rights a month later. After the first production block, which he described as "hitting a brick wall", the show's production was markedly eased as the crew familiarised themselves.

The first episode of the revived Doctor Who, "Rose", aired on 26 March 2005 and received 10.8 million viewers and favourable critical reception. Four days after the transmission of "Rose", Tranter approved a Christmas special and a second series. The press release was overshadowed by a leaked announcement that Christopher Eccleston would leave the role after one series; in response, David Tennant was announced as Eccleston's replacement.

Tennant had been offered the role when he was watching a pre-transmission copy of Doctor Who with Davies and Gardner. Tennant initially believed the offer was a joke, but after he realised they were serious, he accepted the role and made his first appearance in the dénouement of "The Parting of the Ways", the final episode of the first series. Doctor Who continued to be one of BBC's flagship programmes throughout Davies's tenure, and resulted in record sales of the show's official magazine, an increase in spin-off novels, and the launch of the children's magazine Doctor Who Adventures and toy sonic screwdrivers and Daleks. The show's popularity ultimately led to a resurgence in family-orientated Saturday night drama; the ITV science-fiction series Primeval (2006–2011) and the BBC historical dramas Robin Hood (2006–2009) and Merlin (2008–2012) were specifically designed for an early Saturday evening timeslot. Davies was also approached by the BBC to produce several spin-off series, eventually creating two: Torchwood and The Sarah Jane Adventures.

=== Torchwood and The Sarah Jane Adventures ===
"With Doctor Who we often had to pretend that bits of Cardiff were London, or Utah, or the planet Zog. Whereas [Torchwood] is going to be honest-to-God Cardiff. We will happily walk past the Millennium Centre and say, 'Look, there's the Millennium Centre'."

— Russell T Davies, April 2006

In October 2005, BBC Three Controller Stuart Murphy invited Davies to create a post-watershed Doctor Who spin-off in the wake of the parent series' popularity. Torchwood—named after an anagrammatic title ruse used to prevent leaks of Doctor Who's first series—incorporated elements from an abandoned Davies project titled Excalibur and featured the pansexual 51st century time-traveller Jack Harkness (John Barrowman) and a team of alien hunters in Cardiff. The show began production in April 2006 and was marketed through foreshadowing in the main story arc of Doctor Who's second series, which portrayed Torchwood as a covert quasi-governmental organisation that monitors, exploits, and suppresses the existence of extraterrestrial life and technology. Upon its transmission, Torchwood was one of BBC Three's most popular shows; however, it received criticism for "adolescent" use of sexual and violent themes. This led the production team to alter the format to be subtler in its portrayal of adult themes.

Concurrently, he was approached to produce a CBBC show which was described as Young Doctor Who. Davies was reluctant to diminish the mystery of the Doctor's character and instead pitched a show with Elisabeth Sladen as the once-popular companion Sarah Jane Smith: The Sarah Jane Adventures, which follows Sarah Jane and local schoolchildren as they investigate extraterrestrial events in the London Borough of Ealing. The show was given a backdoor pilot as the Doctor Who episode "School Reunion" and premièred in its own right with "Invasion of the Bane" on 1 January 2007. The show was more successful than its 1981 predecessor K-9 and Company; it received more favourable reviews than Torchwood and a significant periphery demographic which compared the show to 1970s Doctor Who episodes.

The workload of managing three separate shows prompted Davies to delegate writing tasks for Torchwood and The Sarah Jane Adventures to other writers so he could focus on writing Doctor Who. After Billie Piper's departure as Rose Tyler in the second series finale "Doomsday", he suggested a third spin-off, Rose Tyler: Earth Defence, a compilation of annual bank holiday specials which followed Rose and a parallel universe version of Torchwood. He later reneged on his idea, as he believed Rose should stay off screen, and abandoned the idea even though it had been budgeted.

=== The Writer's Tale, and writing the fourth series ===
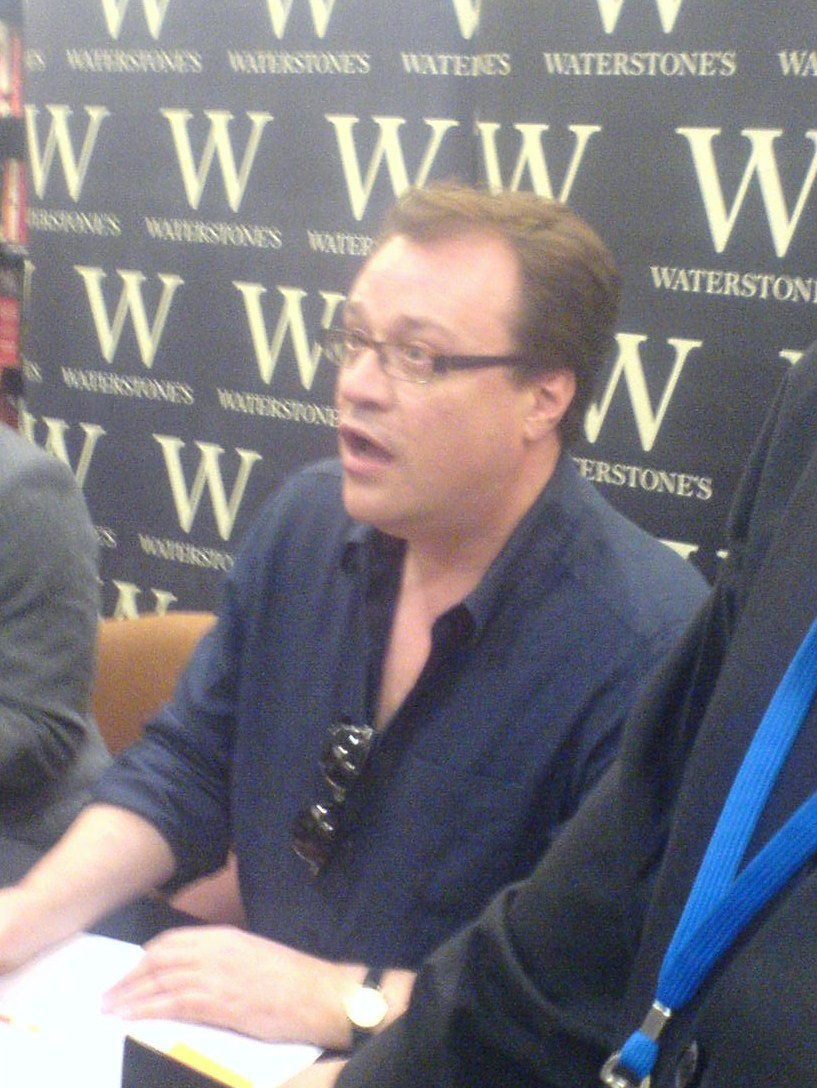
Davies at a book signing for The Writers Tale in Waterstone's, the Trafford Centre, Greater Manchester, on 9 October 2008

In September 2008, BBC Books published The Writer's Tale, a collection of emails between Davies and Radio Times and Doctor Who Magazine journalist Benjamin Cook. Dubbed the "Great Correspondence" by Davies and Cook, The Writer's Tale covers a period between February 2007 and March 2008 and explores his writing processes and the development of his scripts for the fourth series of Doctor Who: "Voyage of the Damned", "Partners in Crime", "Midnight", "Turn Left", "The Stolen Earth", and "Journey's End". The book's first chapter focuses on Cook's "big questions" on Davies's writing style, character development—he used the Doctor Who character Donna Noble (Catherine Tate) and the Skins character Tony Stonem (Nicholas Hoult) as contrasting examples—, how he formulated ideas for stories, and the question "why do you write?". After several weeks, Cook assumes an unofficial advisory role to the scriptwriting and the development of the series. The book's epilogue consists of a short exchange between Davies and Cook: Cook changes from his role as "Invisible Ben" to "Visible Ben" and strongly advises to vastly alter the denouement to "Journey's End" from a cliffhanger which led into "The Next Doctor"—which had occurred in the previous three series finales, "The Parting of the Ways", "Doomsday", and "Last of the Time Lords"—to a melancholy ending that showed the Doctor alone in the TARDIS. After three days of deliberation, Davies accepts Cook's suggestion and thanks him for improving both episodes.

After its release, the pair embarked on a five-stop signing tour to promote the book in October 2008 at Waterstone's branches in London, Birmingham, Manchester, Bristol, and Cardiff. The book received positive reviews: Veronica Horwell of The Guardian wrote Davies was the "Scheherazade of Cardiff Bay" and opined the book should have been twice the published length; Ian Berriman of science fiction magazine SFX gave the book five stars and commented it was the only book about "new Who" a reader needed; television critic Charlie Brooker was inspired by the book to devote an entire episode of his BBC Four show Screenwipe to interviewing television writers; and chat show couple Richard and Judy selected the book as a recommended Christmas present in the "Serious Non-Fiction" category of their book club. A second edition of the book, The Writer's Tale: The Final Chapter, was released in January 2010 by BBC Books. The second edition added 350 pages of correspondence—before excising draft scripts included in the first edition—and covered Davies's final months as executive producer of Doctor Who as he co-wrote the five-part BBC One Torchwood miniseries Children of Earth, planned David Tennant's departure and Matt Smith's arrival as the Doctor, and moved to the United States.

== First Post–Doctor Who career (2010–2021) ==
Davies stepped down from the show's production in 2009 along with Gardner and Collinson, and finished his tenure with four special length episodes. His departure from the show was announced in May 2008, alongside a press release which named Steven Moffat as his successor. His role in late 2008 was split between writing the 2009 specials and preparing for the transition between his and Moffat's production team; one chapter of The Writer's Tale: The Final Chapter discusses plans between him, Gardner, and Tennant to announce Tennant's departure live during ITV's National Television Awards in October 2008. His final full script for Doctor Who was finished in the early morning of 4 March 2009, and filming of the episode closed on 20 May 2009.

Davies moved with Gardner and Jane Tranter to the United States in June 2009 and resided in Los Angeles, California. He continued to oversee production of Torchwood and The Sarah Jane Adventures; he wrote one story for the 2010 series of The Sarah Jane Adventures, Death of the Doctor, which included Matt Smith as the Doctor and Katy Manning as the Doctor's former companion Jo Grant, and was the executive producer and author of the premiere ("The New World") and finale ("The Blood Line") of Torchwood: Miracle Day, the fourth series of Torchwood. He additionally gave informal assistance to and later served as creative consultant of ex-Doctor Who script editor Helen Raynor's and playwright Gary Owen's BBC Cymru Wales drama, Baker Boys. Davies had planned to return to art by writing a graphic novel, and was approached by Lucasfilm to write for the proposed Star Wars live-action television series but refused the commission.

In August 2011, Davies's boyfriend Andrew Smith was diagnosed with a brain tumour, which prompted Davies to postpone current projects and move back to the UK so his partner could undergo treatment closer to their respective families. Davies's return enabled him to develop a replacement series for The Sarah Jane Adventures with prolific series writer Phil Ford after the former series ended due to Elisabeth Sladen's death. Wizards vs Aliens, a CBBC drama about a teenage wizard and his scientist friend and their conflict with the alien Nekross who wished to destroy Earth, was formed to create a "genre clash" between science fiction and supernatural fantasy, as opposed to "culture clashes" such as Cowboys & Aliens. Davies additionally made his first contribution to CBeebies, with two scripts for Old Jack's Boat, which stars Doctor Who alumni Bernard Cribbins and Freema Agyeman as retired fisherman Jack and his neighbour Shelley.

=== Cucumber, Banana, and Tofu ===
Davies's next project after Doctor Who, codenamed More Gay Men, was a spiritual successor to Queer as Folk and would have focused on middle-aged gay men in the Manchester gay scene. The show's genesis dates back from 2001, when his friend Carl Austin asked him "why are gay men so glad when we split up?". The show was due to enter into production in 2006, but was indefinitely postponed due to the success of Doctor Who. Davies continued to develop ideas for the show, and explained a pivotal scene in the premiere to Cook in 2007:

I can imagine a man who is so enraged by something tiny—the fact that his boyfriend won't learn to swim—that he goes into a rage so great that, in one night, his entire life falls apart. It's not about the learning to swim at all, of course, it's about the way that your mind can fix on something small and use it as a gateway to a whole world of anger and pain... If I write the Learn To Swim scene well—and it could be the spine of the whole drama—then I will be saying something about gay men, about couples, about communications, about anger."

— Russell T Davies to Benjamin Cook, 6 March 2007, The Writer's Tale: The Final Chapter

In 2011, the series had entered into pre-production, with American cable network Showtime contracted for transmission and BBC Worldwide for distribution. Showtime had reached the point of casting before Davies moved back to Manchester, at which point the series was picked up by Channel 4 to be produced with Nicola Shindler and the Red Production Company. The commission by Channel 4 marked Davies's first collaboration with the channel since Queer as Folk and Shindler and Red since Casanova. Davies was convinced to return to the channel by Head of Drama and former Doctor Who executive producer Piers Wenger, who described the show as a "political piece of writing" which creates a "radical approach" to sexuality.

Cucumber focuses on the life of the middle-aged Henry Best (Vincent Franklin) and the fallout from a disastrous date with his boyfriend of nine years, and is accompanied with Banana, an E4 anthology series about younger characters across the LGBT spectrum on the periphery of the Cucumber narrative, and Tofu, an online documentary series available on All 4 which discusses modern sex, sexuality and issues arisen during the show with the cast and public. The three names reference a urological scale which categorises the male erection by hardness from tofu to cucumber, and are used to symbolise differences in sexual attitudes and behaviour between the two generations. Although Cucumber was designed as a self-contained serial about the life of one man, Davies envisioned Banana as open-ended with the potential to continue after its sister series finished.

=== Second return to the BBC ===
After Cucumber, Davies returned to the BBC in 2016 to produce A Midsummer Night's Dream, an adaptation of William Shakespeare's c. 1595–96 play A Midsummer Night's Dream. Davies credits the play as "opening his eyes to drama" after he starred in a school version of the play as Bottom.

In 2018, Davies produced and wrote the screenplay for A Very English Scandal, an adaptation of the book A Very English Scandal about the Thorpe affair—a sex scandal which involved former Liberal Party leader Jeremy Thorpe—which starred Hugh Grant as Thorpe and Ben Whishaw as Thorpe's former lover Norman Scott. Davies's screenplay is more compassionate to Thorpe and Scott than previous narratives of the scandal, which he described as "history written by straight men". For his writing on the series, Davies received a nomination for the Primetime Emmy Award for Outstanding Writing for a Limited Series, Movie, or Dramatic Special in 2019.

Davies followed that with the miniseries Years and Years, a Red Production Company series for BBC One which starred Emma Thompson, Rory Kinnear and Russell Tovey. It focuses on an ordinary family in Manchester who experience massive political, economic, and technological changes over fifteen years as a fascist dictator, played by Thompson, takes over Britain.

=== It's a Sin ===
It's a Sin, began filming on 7 October 2019—under the working title of Boys—and completed filming on 31 January 2020. The series, produced by Red Productions for Channel 4, is a dramatised retrospective of the HIV/AIDS crisis during the 1980s, focusing on the men "living in the bedsits", as opposed to films such as Pride, which focused on gay activists. Davies notes the stories about the politics of the crisis and the virus itself has been told, but not those about the early victims of the virus itself.

In 2015, Davies described Boys as a way of "coming to terms" with his own actions during the 1980s, when the shock of the crisis prevented him from properly mourning the deaths of his close friends. Elements of It's a Sin mirror Davies's own experiences during the 1980s: a scene in the second episode where protagonist Richie Tozer—played by Years & Years frontman Olly Alexander—mocks AIDS reflects denialist attitudes in the gay community during the early years of the crisis; the show's characters live in a fictionalised version of the "Pink Palace" flatshare-cum-party house owned by Davies's friends; and Lydia West plays a fictionalised version of Davies's childhood friend—and later actress—Jill Nalder, who appears in the show as the fictional Jill's mother.

It's a Sin is Davies's first script to primarily focus on AIDS since Children's Ward, although the pandemic's legacy is present in his other shows: Queer as Folk relegates AIDS to fleeting mentions as Davies "refused to let [gay peoples'] lives be defined by the disease"; and in Cucumber, middle-aged protagonist Henry blames "those fucking icebergs" for his fear of intimacy. Although the series was filmed prior to the COVID-19 pandemic, the show's transmission in early 2021 invited comparisons between the two pandemics; Davies himself cited the "overreaction and lack of reaction" to the pandemics, as well as the focus on social distancing and personal protective equipment, as "history [repeating] itself", and Alexander likened his character's AIDS denialism in the opening episode to COVID-19 conspiracy theorists.

== Second Doctor Who era (2021–2025) ==
After his departure from Doctor Who, Davies kept in contact with the show's crew and made several contributions to its expanded universe: in 2013, Davies made a cameo appearance in Peter Davison's spoof special The Five(ish) Doctors Reboot; in 2015, his Virgin New Adventures novel Damaged Goods was adapted into an audio play by Big Finish; in 2017 he illustrated a book of Doctor Who poetry titled Now We Are Six Hundred: A Collection of Time Lord Verse; and in 2018, he wrote a novelisation of "Rose" for Target Books.

During the COVID-19 lockdowns in 2020, Davies engaged with Doctor Who fans on social media by writing short stories and drawing sketches. For the "Rose" watch party, Davies released a short story originally written in 2013 for the show's fiftieth anniversary—the story was written for Doctor Who Magazine and stylised as the final pages of a Target novelisation, but was not included in the magazine due to continuity conflicts with the anniversary special "The Day of the Doctor"; for the "New Earth" and "Gridlock" watch party, he wrote the script for an animated sequel, "The Secret of Novice Hame", with Tennant and Anna Hope reprising their roles as the Doctor and Hame respectively; and for "The Runaway Bride" watch party, Davies shared excerpts of his 1986 spec script, Mind of the Hodiac, which was later optioned by Big Finish for its The Lost Stories audio play range and was released on 30 March 2022.

On 24 September 2021, three weeks before filming had wrapped on Chris Chibnall's BBC Centenary special "The Power of the Doctor", the BBC announced Davies would return as Doctor Who showrunner, succeeding Chibnall for the show's 60th anniversary in 2023 and beyond. Davies is joined by the Bad Wolf production company, which was founded by Gardner and Tranter. In May 2022, the BBC announced that Davies had cast Rwandan–Scottish actor Ncuti Gatwa in the role of the Doctor; Gatwa is the first black actor to portray the series' lead role. A week later, the BBC further announced that David Tennant and Catherine Tate would reprise their roles of the Doctor and Donna Noble in the show's 2023 specials, which had already started filming. On 23 October 2022, during the broadcast of "The Power of the Doctor", Tennant's character was revealed to be the Fourteenth Doctor, which followed Jodie Whittaker's Thirteenth Doctor and would precede Ncuti Gatwa's Fifteenth Doctor, who took over in the last of the specials with Tennant, "The Giggle". Tennant's scene at the end of "The Power of the Doctor" was also filmed in May 2022. In November 2022, it was announced that Millie Gibson would join the cast as Ruby Sunday, the companion of the Fifteenth Doctor.

Shooting on Gatwa and Gibson's first recording block began in December 2022, initially overlapping with Gatwa's schedule on the fourth season of Sex Education. Gibson remained a cast member in the next series, and appeared alongside Varada Sethu as the new companion Belinda Chandra. Shooting for the 2025 series began in October 2023, before the first full episode with the Fourteenth or the Fifteenth Doctor, or Sethu's appearance in "Boom" as Belinda's distant descendant Mundy Flynn, had aired. Gatwa portrayed the Doctor for two series and left the series at the end of "The Reality War", broadcast in May 2025; his successor in the show's lead role was Billie Piper, whose specific role in the show was left ambiguous. Davies intended to do a further special without Gatwa to bridge a gap, but plans were changed and he exited the series when the BBC continued to commit to the show's future. Davies said he had never written a script after Gatwa's era, while composer Murray Gold said Davies wrote "multiple versions" of the unmade 2026 Christmas episode. The Guardian and Bleeding Cool both compared Davies's second run as showrunner unfavourably to his first.

On 26 July 2024, during San Diego Comic-Con, the BBC and Disney Branded Television announced Davies would write a new Doctor Who spin-off, The War Between the Land and the Sea, and Jemma Redgrave would reprise her role as UNIT commander Kate Lethbridge-Stewart in the series. It was filmed between August and December 2024. The series aired on BBC One in December 2025 and will air on Disney+ in 2026.

== Second Post–Doctor Who career (2025–present) ==
=== Adult television career after It's a Sin (2023–present) ===
In 2021, Nolly, a miniseries written by Davies about the Crossroads star Noele Gordon, was the first drama commission for Nicola Shindler's newly created production company, the ITV Studios division Quay Street Productions, after Shindler left Red Production Company at the end of 2020. The series aired in 2023, and won Davies Best Writer at the 2023 BAFTA Cymru Awards. Davies also produced and was a script consultant for 2023's Three Little Birds, a fictionalisation of Lenny Henry's mother's experiences arriving in Britain as part of the Windrush generation.

In February 2025, Channel 4 commissioned a new miniseries, Tip Toe, to be written by Davies and produced by him and Shindler's Quay Street for broadcast in 2026. The series stars Alan Cumming as a Canal Street bar owner and David Morrissey as his electrician neighbour, amidst a backdrop of increasing anti-LGBTQ rhetoric in the United Kingdom.

In the 2010s, Davies announced plans to write a series about sextortion, drawing inspiration from real-life incidents of blackmail which resulted in suicide, and to adapt Charles Dickens' The Old Curiosity Shop for television; neither project has yet been realised.

== Writing style ==
Davies is a self-admitted procrastinator and often waits hours or days for concepts to form before he commits them to the script. In The Writer's Tale, he describes his procrastination by discussing his early career: at the time, his method of dealing with the pressures of delivering a script was to "go out drinking" instead. On one occasion in the mid-1990s, he was at the Manchester gay club Cruz 101 when he thought of the climax to the first series of The Grand. As his career progressed, he instead spent entire nights "just thinking of plot, character, pace, etc" and waited until 2:00 am, "when the clubs used to shut", to overcome the urge of procrastination. Davies described the sense of anxiety he experiences in an email to Cook in April 2007, in response to Cook's question of "how do you know when to start writing?":

I leave it till the last minute. And then I leave it some more. Eventually, I leave it till I'm desperate. ... I always think, I'm not ready to write it, I don't know what I'm doing, it's just a jumble of thoughts in a state of flux, there's no story, I don't know how A connects to B, I don't know anything! I get myself into a genuine state of panic. ... Normally, I'll leave it till the deadline, and I haven't even started writing. This has become, over the years, a week beyond the deadline, or even more. It can be a week—or weeks—past the delivery date, and I haven't started writing. In fact, I don't have delivery dates any more. I go by the start-of-preproduction date. I consider that to be my real deadline. And then I miss that. It's a cycle that I cannot break. I simply can't help it. It makes my life miserable.

— Russell T Davies to Benjamin Cook, 3 April 2007

Davies expanded on his email two weeks later in response to Cook's query about the supposed link between major depressive disorder and creativity. He explained his anxiety and melancholy during the scriptwriting period still allowed him to keep on top of his work; on the other hand, he thought "Depression with a capital D [didn't provide] any such luxury".

Davies explained in length his writing process to Cook in The Writer's Tale. When he creates characters, he initially assigns a character a name and fits attributes around it. In the case of Rose Tyler (Billie Piper) in his inaugural series of Doctor Who, he chose the name because he considered it a "good luck charm" after he used it for Lesley Sharp's character in Bob & Rose. He presented his desire to make the show "essentially British" as another justification: he considered Rose to be "the most British name in the world" and feminine enough to subvert the then-current trend of female companions and their "boyish" names, such as Benny, Charley, and Ace. While he was writing for The Grand, the executive producer requested that he change the female lead character's name, a decision that led to the "character never [feeling] right from that moment on". The surname "Harkness", most notably given to Torchwood lead Captain Jack Harkness, is a similar charm, first used in 1993 for the Harkness family in Century Falls, and ultimately derived from the Marvel Universe supporting character Agatha Harkness, and the surname "Tyler" is similarly used because of his affection for how the surname is spelled and pronounced.

Davies also attempts to channel his writing by using music that fits the theme of the series as a source of inspiration: Doctor Who was typically written while he listened to action-adventure film scores; Queer as Folk was written to Hi-NRG music "to catch [the] sheer clubland drive"; Bob & Rose was written to the Moby album Play, because the two works shared an "urban, sexy, full of lonely hearts at night" image; and The Second Coming shared the concepts of "experimental[ity], anguish, dark[ness], [and] pain" of Radiohead albums. More specifically, he wrote the early drafts of the fourth series Doctor Who episode "Partners in Crime" while he was listening to Mika's Life in Cartoon Motion, and singled out the song "Any Other World" as a "Doctor Who companion song" with lyrics that matched Penny, the planned companion for the fourth series.

When he creates new scripts, Davies considers the dénouement of a story to be representative of the work. He often formulates both the scene and its emotional impact early in the process, but writes the scenes last due to his belief that "[later scenes] can't exist if they aren't informed by where they've come from". Davies is a strong advocate for the continued use of the cliffhanger ending and opposes advertising that sacrifices the impact of storytelling. In pursuit of his quest, he instructs editors to remove scenes from press copies of episodes he writes; cliffhangers were removed from the review copies of the Doctor Who episodes "Army of Ghosts", "The Stolen Earth", and the first part of "The End of Time", and Rose Tyler's unadvertised appearance in "Partners in Crime" was excised. In an interview with BBC News shortly after the transmission of episode "The Stolen Earth", he argued that the success of a popular television series is linked to how well producers can keep secrets and create a "live experience":

It's exciting when you get kids in playground talking about your story, about who's going to live or die, then I consider that a job well done, because that's interactive television, that's what it's all about: it's debate and fun and chat. It's playing a game with the country and I think that's wonderful.

— Russell T Davies, "Struggle to keep Who secret", BBC News Online

Davies attempts to both create imagery and to provide a social commentary in his scripts; for example, he uses camera directions in his scripts more frequently than newer screenwriters to ensure that anyone who reads the script, especially the director, is able to "feel... the pace, the speed, the atmosphere, the mood, the gags, [and] the dread". His stage directions also create an atmosphere by their formatting and avoidance of the first person. Although the basis of several of his scripts derive from previous concepts, he claims most concepts for storytelling have been already used, and instead tries to tell a relatively new and entertaining plot; for example, the Doctor Who episode "Turn Left" shares its concept most notably with the 1998 film Sliding Doors. Like how Sliding Doors examines two timelines based on whether Helen Quilley (Gwyneth Paltrow) catches a London Underground train, Davies uses the choice of the Doctor's companion to turn left or right at a road intersection to depict either a world with the Doctor, as seen throughout the rest of the fourth series, or an alternate world without the Doctor, examined in its entirety within the episode. The world without the Doctor creates a dystopia which he uses to provide a commentary on Nazi-esque fascism. Davies generally tries to make his scripts "quite detailed, but very succinct", and eschews the long character and set descriptions; instead, he limits himself to only three adjectives to describe a character and two lines to describe a set to allow the dialogue to describe the story instead.

Davies also uses his scripts to examine and debate on large issues such as sexuality and religion, especially from a homosexual or atheist perspective. He refrains from a dependence on "cheap, easy lines" which provide little deeper insight; his mantra during his early adult drama career was "no boring issues". As of 2008, Queer as Folk was the primary vehicle for his social commentary of homosexuality and advocation of greater acceptance. He used the series to challenge the "primal ... gut instinct" of homophobia by introducing homosexual imagery in contrast to the heterosexual "fundamental image of life, of family, of childhood, [and] of survival". His next series, Bob & Rose, examined the issue of a gay man who falls in love with a woman, and the reaction of the couple's respective social circles. Torchwood, in Davies's own words, is "a very bisexual programme", and demonstrates a fluid approach to both gender and sexuality "almost from its opening moments": for example, the lead character Captain Jack Harkness nonchalantly mentions he was once pregnant; and later, the other lead characters discuss Jack's sexuality. The culture website AfterElton opined that Torchwood's biggest breakthrough could be "queer representation" by showing Captain Jack as a character whose bisexuality is explored but not his only character trait. It's a Sin reflected on 1980s and 1990s gay history, while Tip Toe looked at the fears, horror, and joy experienced by queer people at the time it was broadcast in 2026.

Davies's most notable commentaries on religion and atheism are The Second Coming and his 2007 Doctor Who episode "Gridlock". The Second Coming's depiction of a contemporary and realistic Second Coming of Jesus Christ eschews the use of religious iconography in favour of a love story underlined by the male lead's "awakening as the Son of God". In contrast, "Gridlock" takes a more pro-active role in debating religion: the episode depicts the unity of the supporting cast in singing the Christian hymns "Abide with Me" and "The Old Rugged Cross" as a positive aspect of faith, but depicts the Doctor as an atheistic hero which shows the faith as misguided because "there is no higher authority". He also includes his commentary as an undertone in other stories; he described the sub-plot of the differing belief systems of the Doctor and Queen Victoria in "Tooth and Claw" as a conflict between "Rational Man versus Head of the Church".

Like other script writers during Doctor Who's original tenure, several of Davies's scripts are influenced by his personal politics. Marc Edward DiPaolo of Oklahoma City University observes that Davies usually espouses a "left-leaning" view through his scripts. Beyond religion and sexuality, Davies most notably satirises the United States under George W. Bush on Doctor Who: the Slitheen in "Aliens of London" and "World War Three" and Henry van Statten in "Dalek" were portrayed as sociopathic capitalists; the Daleks under his tenure echoed contemporary American conservatives in their appearances, from religious fundamentalists in "The Parting of the Ways" to imperialists in "Daleks in Manhattan" and "Evolution of the Daleks"; and in "The Sound of Drums", a parody of Bush is murdered by the Master (John Simm), who was presented in the story as a Prime Minister reminiscent of Tony Blair. Other targets of satire in his Doctor Who scripts include Fox News, News Corporation, and the 24-hour news cycle in "The Long Game", plastic surgery and consumer culture in "The End of the World", obesity and alternative medicine in "Partners in Crime", and racism and paranoia in "Midnight".

As well as Doctor Who, Davies wrote political messaging into his adult dramas. He decided to write Years and Years after Donald Trump won the 2016 United States presidential election. He has said that before the 2019 Conservative Party leadership election made him Prime Minister, Boris Johnson "does exactly what Viv Rook does: He spent many years appearing on panel shows on television, on comedy shows, and saying outrageous things to get a laugh".

== Recognition ==
Saving it from extinction.

— Frank Cottrell-Boyce, when asked his opinion on Davies's greatest contribution to British television drama.

Davies has received recognition for his work since his career as a children's television writer. Davies's first BAFTA award nominations came in 1993 when he was nominated for the "Children's Programme (Fiction or Entertainment)" British Academy Television Award for his work on Children's Ward. Children's Ward was nominated for the "Drama" British Academy Children's Award in 1996 and won the same award in 1997. His next critically successful series was Bob & Rose; it was nominated for a Television Award for Best Drama Serial and won two British Comedy Awards for Best Comedy Drama and Writer of the Year. The Second Coming was nominated for the same Television Award in 2004. His work on The Second Coming earned him a nomination for a Royal Television Society Programme Award.

Much of Davies's recognition came as a result of his work on Doctor Who. In 2006, Doctor Who won two Television Awards—Best Drama Series and the Pioneer Audience Award—and he was awarded the honorary Dennis Potter Award for writing. He also received that year's BAFTA Cymru Siân Phillips Award for Outstanding Contribution to Network Television. At the Edinburgh International Television Festival, he was awarded the accolade of "Industry Player of the Year" in 2006. In 2007, Davies won the "Best Soap/Series" Writers' Guild of Great Britain Award—along with Chris Chibnall, Paul Cornell, Stephen Greenhorn, Steven Moffat, Helen Raynor, and Gareth Roberts—for their work on the third series of Doctor Who. He was again nominated for two BAFTA Awards in 2009: a Television Award for his work on Doctor Who, and the Television Craft Award for Best Writer, for the episode "Midnight". Davies was nominated four times for competitive BAFTA Cymru awards due to his work on Doctor Who: in 2006, he was nominated for Best Screenwriter for the whole series; in 2007, he won the same award for "Doomsday"; in 2009, he won the award again for "Midnight"; and he was nominated again for Best Writer in 2024.

Under his tenure, Doctor Who won five consecutive National Television Awards between 2005 and 2010. Davies has also been nominated for five Hugo Awards for his Doctor Who scripts in 2007, 2009, 2010, 2024, and 2025, all in the category of "Best Dramatic Presentation, Short Form": in 2007, the story comprising "Army of Ghosts" and "Doomsday" was defeated by Steven Moffat's "The Girl in the Fireplace"; in 2009, the episode "Turn Left" was defeated by Joss Whedon's Dr. Horrible's Sing-Along Blog; and in 2010, all three of his scripts which were eligible for the award, "The Next Doctor", the Davies–Roberts collaboration "Planet of the Dead", and the Davies–Ford collaboration "The Waters of Mars", were nominated: the award was won by "The Waters of Mars" and the other episodes took second and third place. In 2024, his episodes "The Giggle" and "Wild Blue Yonder" lost to The Last of Us episode "Long, Long Time", directed by Peter Hoar, a director of It's a Sin, Nolly, and Doctor Who series 15 for Davies, and a prior nominee for the same award for series 6's "A Good Man Goes to War". Davies's episodes "73 Yards" and "Dot and Bubble" were nominated for the award in 2025.

The first episode of Torchwood: Children of Earth was nominated for a BAFTA Cymru Award for Best Screenwriter in 2010, and in 2011 The Sarah Jane Adventures was nominated by BAFTA for the Best Children's Drama award.

During Davies's first tenure as executive producer (2005–2010), only Steven Moffat's "Silence in the Library", which was scheduled against the final of the second series of Britain's Got Talent, failed to win in its time slot. The show's viewing figures were consistently high enough that the only broadcasts to have consistently rivalled Doctor Who for viewers in the Broadcasters' Audience Research Board's weekly charts were EastEnders, Coronation Street, Britain's Got Talent, and international football matches. His first episode "Rose" was seen by 10.81 million viewers within seven days, and was the seventh most watched programme of the week. Two of his scripts, "Voyage of the Damned" and "The Stolen Earth", broke audience records for the show by being declared the second most viewed broadcasts of their respective weeks, and "Journey's End" became the first episode to be the most viewed broadcast of the week. Within seven days of the transmission of Davies's returning episode "The Star Beast" (2023), the episode was the most watched Doctor Who broadcast in the UK since 2018's "The Tsuranga Conundrum", and the ninth most watched drama programme in the whole of 2023, beaten only by episodes of Happy Valley (2014–2023) and Death in Paradise (premiered 2011). All three of the 60th anniversary specials ranked as the top ten most watched broadcast of their respective weeks, although these episodes were behind multiple episodes of just two shows: Strictly Come Dancing and I'm a Celebrity...Get Me Out of Here! His second era also had enough viewers for the 2023 and 2024 Christmas specials—his own script for "The Church on Ruby Road" and Moffat's "Joy to the World"—to surpass EastEnders and Coronation Street's episodes on Christmas Day and have comparative ratings with Call the Midwife (premiered 2012). Every episode of series 14 except for "Dot and Bubble" was in the top 20 most watched broadcasts of the week in the UK, with the first five episodes averaging a position of 16th place, comparable with series 1 in 2005. The season premiere "Space Babies" placed 10th after seven days and 9th after 28 days. The episode immediately following it and released the same day, "The Devil's Chord", (Note: Both "Space Babies" and "The Devil's Chord" debuted on BBC iPlayer at midnight on 11 May, and on Disney+ in timezones west of British Summer Time on 10 May.) placed 12th after seven days and 6th after 28 days. The season's main competition was against the Netflix UK broadcast of Bridgerton (premiered 2020), coverage of the 2024 general election, soap operas, and football. The show enjoyed consistent Appreciation Index ratings during both eras Davies worked as executive producer: "Love & Monsters", regarded by Doctor Who fans as the worst of Davies's scripts during his first era, gained a rating of 76, just short of the 2006 average rating of 77; and the episodes "The Stolen Earth" and "Journey's End" share the highest rating Doctor Who has received, at 91. During the second Davies era, ratings ranged from "Space Babies" having 75.4 to "The Giggle" having 84.9.

Among Doctor Who fans, his contribution to the show ranks as high as the show's first producer Verity Lambert: in a 2009 poll of 6,700 Doctor Who Magazine readers, he won the "Greatest Contribution" award with 22.62% of the votes against Lambert's 22.49% share, in addition to winning the magazine's 2005, 2006, and 2008 awards for the best writer of each series. Ian Farrington, who commented on the 2009 "Greatest Contribution" poll, attributed Davies's popularity to his range of writing styles, from the epic "Doomsday" to the minimalistic "Midnight", and his ability to market the show to appeal to a wide audience.

Davies's work on Doctor Who has led to accolades out of the television industry. He features in the Pinc List of leading Welsh LGBT figures. Between 2005 and 2008, he was included in The Guardian's "Media 100": in 2005, he was ranked the 14th most influential man in the media; in 2006, the 28th; in 2007, the 15th; and in 2008, the 31st. In 2008 he was ranked the 42nd most influential person in British culture by The Telegraph. The Independent on Sunday recognised his contributions to the public by including him on seven consecutive Pink Lists, which chronicle the achievements of gay and lesbian personalities: in 2005, he was ranked the 73rd most influential gay person; in 2006, the 18th; in 2007, the most influential gay person; in 2008, the 2nd; in 2009, the 14th; in 2010, the 64th; in 2011, the 47th; in 2012, the 56th; and in 2013, was listed as a permanent member of the List's "national treasures". Davies was appointed Officer of the Order of the British Empire in the 2008 Birthday Honours for services to drama, and an honorary fellowship by Cardiff University in July 2008.

Since his initial departure from Doctor Who, Davies has continued to receive recognition for his work: in 2016, Davies won a British Academy Craft Award in the category of "Best Writer: Drama" for Cucumber; in 2017, A Midsummer Night's Dream was nominated for BAFTA Cymru's "Best Feature/Television Film Award"; in 2019, Davies was nominated for seven awards for A Very English Scandal—a British Academy Television Award for "Best Mini-Series", a British Academy Craft Award and a Royal Television Society Award for "Best Writer: Drama", a British Academy Cymru Award for "Best Writer", a Primetime Emmy Award for Outstanding Writing for a Limited Series, Movie, or Dramatic Special, a USC Scripter Award for Television, and a Writers' Guild of Great Britain Award for Best Short Form TV Drama—and won the Cymru Award, USC Scripter Award, and the Writers' Guild Award; in 2020, Years and Years was nominated for the British Academy Cymru Award for "Best Writer"; in 2021, It's a Sin was nominated for three BAFTA Cymru Awards, with Davies winning the award for writing; and in 2022, It's a Sin received six British Academy Television Award nominations and five British Academy Craft Award nominations, with Davies being nominated for the British Academy Craft Award for Best Writing: Drama. The same year, Davies also won the Writers' Guild Award for Best Long Form TV Drama. In July 2022, Davies was elected as a Fellow of the Royal Society of Literature for his contributions to television. In 2016 he won the award for Outstanding Contribution to Writing at the Writers' Guild Awards, and in 2017 and 2021 he was the recipient of the Outstanding Achievement Award at the Edinburgh International Television Festival and Royal Television Society Programme Awards, respectively.

== Personal life ==
Davies was in a relationship with Andrew Smith, a customs officer, between 1999 and Smith's death in 2018. They entered into a civil partnership on 1 December 2012, after Smith was diagnosed with a brain tumour from which he was given only a 3% chance of recovering. Following Smith's diagnosis in 2011, the couple relocated back to the United Kingdom, having moved to Los Angeles in 2009. Smith died on 29 September 2018. Years and Years ends with a title card which dedicates the series to Smith. Since 2025, Davies has been in a relationship with Australian model Oliver Cole, who is 36 years his junior.

In an interview with the Royal Television Society in 2019, Davies described himself as "absolutely happily left wing". While being interviewed about It's a Sin on ITV Wales in 2021, Davies was asked if he was "indy-curious" about Welsh independence. He replied that he was not sure the current Senedd was worthy, but that the government at Whitehall did not care about Welsh issues and that Wales should start looking into fending for itself.

In May 2025, Davies was among more than 400 authors and organisations who signed an open letter calling for an immediate ceasefire in Gaza, unrestricted humanitarian aid, and sanctions against Israel. The letter referred to Israel's actions in the 2023–ongoing Gaza war as "genocidal".

Davies's memoir, The Queerest of Folk: A Life in Television, was published on 8 October 2026.

== Production credits ==
Series	Channels	Years	Credited as				Note(s)
Series	Channels	Years	Writer	Producer	Executive producer	Other roles	Note(s)
Why Don't You?	BBC1	1985–90	Yes	Yes		Director, assistant floor manager, and publicist	Various episodes
Play School	BBC1	1987				Presenter	One episode
On the Waterfront	BBC1	1988–89				Sketch writer and script editor	
DEF II	BBC2	1989				Sketch writer	Various episodes, uncredited
Breakfast Serials	BBC1	1990	Yes	Yes			
Dark Season	BBC1	1991	Yes			Creator	Also wrote the novelisation
Children's Ward	ITV	1992–96	Yes	Yes			
Families	ITV	1992–93				Storyliner	
ChuckleVision	BBC1	1992	Yes				Three episodes
Century Falls	BBC1	1993	Yes			Creator	
Cluedo	ITV	1993	Yes				One episode
Do the Right Thing	BBC1	1994–95				Scriptwriter	Uncredited
The House of Windsor	ITV	1994	Yes				Various episodes, several uncredited
Revelations	ITV	1994–95	Yes			Co-creator	Various episodes. Created with Brian B. Thompson and Tony Wood.
Coronation Street	ITV	1996				Storyliner	Two weeks; cover for permanent storyliner.
Springhill	Channel 4/Sky One	1996–97	Yes			Co-creator and storyliner	Seven episodes. Created with Paul Abbott and Frank Cottrell Boyce.
Coronation Street: Viva Las Vegas!	Straight-to-video	1997	Yes				
Touching Evil	BBC1	1997	Yes				One episode
The Grand	ITV	1997–98	Yes				18 episodes, several uncredited
Queer as Folk	Channel 4	1999–2000	Yes	Yes		Creator	Scripts published as Queen as Folk: The Scripts (1999)
Bob & Rose	ITV	2001	Yes	Yes		Creator	
Linda Green	BBC One	2001	Yes				One episode
The Second Coming	ITV	2003	Yes		Yes	Creator	
Mine All Mine	ITV	2004	Yes		Yes	Creator	
Casanova	BBC Three	2005	Yes		Yes	Creator	
Doctor Who	BBC One (2005–10, 2023–2025); Disney+ (2023–2025)	2005–10; 2023–2025	Yes		Yes	Showrunner; head writer	46 episodes (Note: "The End of Time" makes up two episodes. Davies also performed uncredited work on "The Power of the Doctor".) and six mini-episodes (Note: five shown on BBC One, one shown on CBeebies) (writer); Unproduced spec script written in the 1980s; 71 episodes (executive producer and showrunner)
Doctor Who Confidential	BBC Three	2005–10			Yes		
Tardisodes	BBC.co.uk	2006			Yes		
Torchwood	BBC Three (2006–07); BBC Two (2007); BBC One (2009); BBC HD (2006–09); BBC One (HD)/Starz (2011)	2006–11	Yes		Yes	Creator	Six episodes (written by); 41 episodes (creator and executive producer)
Torchwood Declassified	BBC Three	2006–11			Yes		
The Sarah Jane Adventures	CBBC/BBC One	2007–11	Yes		Yes	Creator	Three episodes (written by) (Note: Death of the Doctor makes up two episodes); 53 episodes (creator and executive producer); Webcast written for Doctor Who: Lockdown in 2020
Baker Boys	BBC One Wales	2011				Creative consultant	
Wizards vs Aliens	CBBC	2012–13	Yes		Yes	Co-creator	Created with Phil Ford
Old Jack's Boat	CBeebies	2013	Yes				Two episodes
The Five(ish) Doctors Reboot	BBC Red Button	2013				Actor	Played a caricature of himself
Cucumber	Channel 4	2015	Yes		Yes	Creator	Cucumber, Banana, and Tofu share a fictional universe
Banana	E4	2015	Yes		Yes	Creator	Cucumber, Banana, and Tofu share a fictional universe
Tofu	All 4	2015			Yes	Creator	Cucumber, Banana, and Tofu share a fictional universe
A Midsummer Night's Dream	BBC One	2016	Yes		Yes		
A Very English Scandal	BBC One	2018	Yes		Yes		Adaptation of the 2016 book A Very English Scandal
Years and Years	BBC One	2019	Yes		Yes	Creator	
It's a Sin	Channel 4	2021	Yes		Yes	Creator	
Nolly	ITV	2023	Yes		Yes	Creator	
Three Little Birds	ITV	2023			Yes	Script consultant	
Tales of the TARDIS	BBC iPlayer	2023–2024	Yes		Yes	Creator	
The War Between the Land and the Sea	BBC One/Disney+	2025	Yes		Yes	Creator	Two episodes (written by); Five episodes (creator and executive producer)
Tip Toe	Channel 4	2026	Yes		Yes	Creator	

=== Doctor Who franchise writing credits ===
Doctor Who credits
Year	Episode	Notes
Doctor Who credits (2005–2010)
2005	"Rose"	Series 1
2005	"The End of the World"	Series 1
2005	"Aliens of London" / "World War Three"	Series 1
2005	"The Long Game"	Series 1
2005	"Boom Town"	Series 1
2005	"Bad Wolf" / "The Parting of the Ways"	Series 1
2005	"The Christmas Invasion"	Christmas special
2006	"New Earth"	Series 2
2006	"Tooth and Claw"	Series 2
2006	"Love & Monsters"	Series 2
2006	"Army of Ghosts" / "Doomsday"	Series 2
2006	"The Runaway Bride"	Christmas special
2007	"Smith and Jones"	Series 3
2007	"Gridlock"	Series 3
2007	"Utopia" / "The Sound of Drums" / "Last of the Time Lords"	Series 3
2007	"Voyage of the Damned"	Christmas special
2008	"Partners in Crime"	Series 4
2008	"Midnight"	Series 4
2008	"Turn Left"	Series 4
2008	"The Stolen Earth" / "Journey's End"	Series 4
2008	"The Next Doctor"	2008–2010 specials: "Planet of the Dead" co-written with Gareth Roberts; "The Waters of Mars" co-written with Phil Ford
2009	"Planet of the Dead"	2008–2010 specials: "Planet of the Dead" co-written with Gareth Roberts; "The Waters of Mars" co-written with Phil Ford
2009	"The Waters of Mars"	2008–2010 specials: "Planet of the Dead" co-written with Gareth Roberts; "The Waters of Mars" co-written with Phil Ford
2009–2010	"The End of Time"	2008–2010 specials: "Planet of the Dead" co-written with Gareth Roberts; "The Waters of Mars" co-written with Phil Ford
Doctor Who credits (2022–2025)
2022	"The Power of the Doctor"	BBC Centenary special, uncredited, 1 scene
2023	"The Star Beast"	2023 specials
2023	"Wild Blue Yonder"	2023 specials
2023	"The Giggle"	2023 specials
2023	"The Church on Ruby Road"	Christmas special
2024	"Space Babies"	Series 14 (Note: Also known as Season 1)
2024	"The Devil's Chord"	Series 14
2024	"73 Yards"	Series 14
2024	"Dot and Bubble"	Series 14
2024	"The Legend of Ruby Sunday" / "Empire of Death"	Series 14
2025	"The Robot Revolution"	Series 15 (Note: Also known as Season 2): "The Well" co-written with Sharma Angel-Walfall
2025	"Lux"	Series 15: "The Well" co-written with Sharma Angel-Walfall
2025	"The Well"	Series 15: "The Well" co-written with Sharma Angel-Walfall
2025	"Wish World" / "The Reality War"	Series 15: "The Well" co-written with Sharma Angel-Walfall
Torchwood credits
2006	"Everything Changes"	Series 1
2009	"Day One"	Children of Earth: "Day Three" co-written with James Moran
2009	"Day Three"	Children of Earth: "Day Three" co-written with James Moran
2009	"Day Five"	Children of Earth: "Day Three" co-written with James Moran
2011	"The New World"	Miracle Day: "The Blood Line" co-written with Jane Espenson
2011	"The Blood Line"	Miracle Day: "The Blood Line" co-written with Jane Espenson
The Sarah Jane Adventures credits
2007	"Invasion of the Bane"	New Year's Day special. Co-written with Gareth Roberts
2010	Death of the Doctor	Series 4
Tales of the TARDIS credits
2023	"Earthshock"	Additional material only; original story by Eric Saward
2024	"Pyramids of Mars"	Additional material only; original story by Stephen Harris
The War Between the Land and the Sea credits
2025	"Homo Aqua"	Miniseries
2025	"The End of the War"	Miniseries
Minisodes credits
2005	"Doctor Who: Children in Need"	Mini-episode and part of Children in Need 2005. Also known as "Born Again".
2008	"Music of the Spheres"	Mini-episode and part of the 2008 Doctor Who Prom
2009	Untitled Tonight's the Night sketch	Mini-episode and part of Tonight's the Night
2009	"The Doctor and the Reindeer"	A BBC One "Circle" ident; David Tennant portrays the Doctor in a set of scenes aired to promote Christmas on BBC One in 2009.
2023	"Destination: Skaro"	Mini-episode and part of Children in Need 2023
2023	"Doctor Who: The Bedtime Story"	Mini-episode. Broadcast on CBeebies.
2024	"Bad Music"	Mini-episode and part of the 2024 Doctor Who Prom
Doctor Who novel credits
1996	Damaged Goods	Adapted into audio in 2015 by Jonathan Morris
2018	Rose	Novelisation of the 2005 episode
Doctor Who short fiction credits
2020	"Revenge of the Nestene"	Doctor Who: Adventures in Lockdown
2020	"Doctor Who and the Time War"	Doctor Who: Adventures in Lockdown
2020	"The Secret of Novice Hame"	Doctor Who: Adventures in Lockdown
Doctor Who non-fiction book credits
2008	The Writer's Tale	With Benjamin Cook
2010	The Writer's Tale: The Final Chapter	With Benjamin Cook. Expanded edition of The Writer's Tale.
Doctor Who illustrator credits
2017	Now We Are Six Hundred: A Collection of Time Lord Verse	Written by James Goss
Unbroadcast credits
1986	Mind of the Hodiac	Unbroadcast spec script, later written as an audio drama by Davies and Scott Handcock for Big Finish Productions in 2022

== Awards and nominations ==
Year	Award	Work	Category	Result	Note(s)	Ref.
1993	British Academy Television Awards	Children's Ward	Children's Programme – Fiction or Entertainment	Nominated		
1996	British Academy Children's Awards	Children's Ward	Drama	Nominated	With Kieran Roberts and Beryl Richards	
1997	British Academy Children's Awards	Children's Ward	Drama	Won	With Kieran Roberts and Beryl Richards	
2001	British Comedy Awards	Bob & Rose	Writer of the Year	Won		
2002	British Academy Television Awards	Bob & Rose	Drama Serial	Nominated	With Ann Harrison-Baxter, Julian Farino, and Joe Wright	
2004	British Academy Television Awards	The Second Coming	Drama Serial	Nominated	With Ann Harrison-Baxter and Adrian Shergold	
2004	Royal Television Society Programme Awards	The Second Coming	Writing	Nominated		
2006	Edinburgh International Television Festival	—N/a	Industry Player of the Year	Won		
2006	British Academy Television Awards	—N/a	Dennis Potter Award	Won		
2006	British Academy Television Awards	Doctor Who	Drama Series	Won	With Phil Collinson and Julie Gardner	
2006	British Academy Television Craft Awards	Doctor Who	Writer	Nominated		
2006	BAFTA Cymru	Doctor Who	Screenwriter	Nominated		
2006	BAFTA Cymru	—N/a	Siân Phillips Award	Won		
2007	BAFTA Cymru	Doctor Who: "Doomsday"	Screenwriter	Won		
2007	Writers' Guild of Great Britain Awards	Doctor Who series 3	Best Soap/Series (TV)	Won	With Chris Chibnall, Paul Cornell, Stephen Greenhorn, Steven Moffat, Helen Raynor, and Gareth Roberts	
2007	Hugo Award	Doctor Who: "Army of Ghosts"/"Doomsday"	Best Dramatic Presentation, Short Form	Nominated	With Graeme Harper	
2008	SFX Awards					
2008	SFX Awards	—N/a	Hall of Fame	Nominated		
2008	SFX Awards	Doctor Who	Best TV Series	Won		
2008	SFX Awards	Doctor Who: "The Stolen Earth"/"Journey's End"	Best TV Episode	Won		
2008	SFX Awards	Doctor Who: "Midnight"	Best TV Episode	Nominated		
2008	SFX Awards	Doctor Who: "Turn Left"	Best TV Episode	Nominated		
2009	Hugo Award	Doctor Who: "Turn Left"	Best Dramatic Presentation, Short Form	Nominated	With Graeme Harper	
2009	British Academy Television Craft Awards	Doctor Who: "Midnight"	Writer	Nominated		
2009	BAFTA Cymru	Doctor Who: "Midnight"	Screenwriter	Won		
2009	British Academy Television Awards	Doctor Who	Drama Series	Nominated	With Phil Collinson, Julie Gardner, and Susie Liggat	
2009	British Fantasy Awards	Doctor Who	Television	Won		
2010	British Fantasy Awards	Doctor Who	Television	Won		
2010	BAFTA Cymru	Torchwood: Children of Earth: "Day One"	Screenwriter	Nominated		
2010	SFX Awards	Torchwood: Children of Earth: "Day Five"	Best TV Episode	Won		
2010	SFX Awards	Doctor Who: "The Next Doctor"	Best TV Episode	Nominated		
2010	Hugo Award	Doctor Who: "The Next Doctor"	Best Dramatic Presentation, Short Form	Nominated	With Andy Goddard	
2010	Hugo Award	Doctor Who: "Planet of the Dead"	Best Dramatic Presentation, Short Form	Nominated	With Gareth Roberts and James Strong	
2010	SFX Awards	Doctor Who: "Planet of the Dead"	Best TV Episode	Nominated	With Gareth Roberts	
2010	Hugo Award	Doctor Who: "The Waters of Mars"	Best Dramatic Presentation, Short Form	Won	With Phil Ford and Graeme Harper	
2011	British Academy Children's Awards	The Sarah Jane Adventures	Drama	Nominated	With Brian Minchin and Ashley Way	
2016	British Academy Television Craft Awards	Cucumber	Writer: Drama	Won		
2016	Royal Television Society Programme Awards	Cucumber	Writer: Drama	Nominated		
2016	Writers' Guild of Great Britain Awards	—N/a	Outstanding Contribution to Writing	Won		
2017	Edinburgh International Television Festival	—N/a	Outstanding Achievement Award	Won		
2019	British Academy Television Craft Awards	A Very English Scandal	Writer: Drama	Nominated		
2019	Royal Television Society Programme Awards	A Very English Scandal	Writer: Drama	Nominated		
2019	British Academy Television Awards	A Very English Scandal	Mini-Series	Nominated	With Stephen Frears, Dominic Treadwell-Collins, and Dan Winch	
2019	Primetime Emmy Awards	A Very English Scandal	Outstanding Writing for a Limited or Anthology Series or Movie	Nominated		
2019	USC Scripter Awards	A Very English Scandal	Television	Won		
2019	Writers' Guild of Great Britain Awards	A Very English Scandal	Best Short Form TV Drama	Won		
2019	BAFTA Cymru	A Very English Scandal	Writer	Won		
2020	BAFTA Cymru	Years and Years	Writer	Nominated		
2021	BAFTA Cymru	It's a Sin	Writer	Won		
2021	Seoul International Drama Awards	It's a Sin	Writer	Won		
2021	Royal Television Society Programme Awards	—N/a	Outstanding Achievement Award	Won		
2022	Royal Television Society Programme Awards	It's a Sin	Writer: Drama	Won		
2022	British Academy Television Craft Awards	It's a Sin	Writer: Drama	Nominated		
2022	Broadcasting Press Guild Awards	It's a Sin	Best Writer	Won		
2022	British Academy Television Awards	It's a Sin	Mini-Series	Nominated	With Nicola Shindler, Peter Hoar, and Phil Collinson	
2022	Writers' Guild of Great Britain Awards	It's a Sin	Best Long Form TV Drama	Won		
2023	BAFTA Cymru	Nolly	Writer	Won		
2024	BAFTA Cymru	Doctor Who	Writer	Nominated		
2024	Hugo Award	Doctor Who: "Wild Blue Yonder"	Best Dramatic Presentation, Short Form	Nominated	With Tom Kingsley	
2024	Hugo Award	Doctor Who: "The Giggle"	Best Dramatic Presentation, Short Form	Nominated	With Chanya Button	
2025	Hugo Award	Doctor Who: "73 Yards"	Best Dramatic Presentation, Short Form	Nominated	With Dylan Holmes Williams	
2025	Hugo Award	Doctor Who: "Dot and Bubble"	Best Dramatic Presentation, Short Form	Nominated	With Dylan Holmes Williams	
2025	Nebula Award	Doctor Who: "Dot and Bubble"	Ray Bradbury Nebula Award for Outstanding Dramatic Presentation	Nominated		
2025	BAFTA Cymru	—N/a	Outstanding Contribution to Television	Won		

== See also ==
- List of atheists in film, radio, television and theater

== Bibliography ==
- Ainsworth, John, ed. (2015). Doctor Who: The Complete History. Vol. 51. Panini Comics/Hachette.
- Ainsworth, John, ed. (2016). Doctor Who: The Complete History. Vol. 48. Panini Comics/Hachette.
- Aldridge, Mark; Murray, Andy (30 November 2008). T is for Television: The Small Screen Adventures of Russell T Davies. Reynolds & Hearn Ltd. ISBN 978-1-905287-84-0.
- Bradley, Dave, ed. (17 December 2008). "SFX Reader Awards 2008". SFX. No. 178. Bath, Somerset: Future Publishing. pp. 93–100.
- Bradley, Dave, ed. (February 2010). "SFX Sci-Fi Awards 2010 in association with Play.com". SFX. No. 193. Bath, Somerset: Future Publishing. pp. 95–101.
- Davies, Russell T; Cook, Benjamin (25 September 2008). Doctor Who: The Writer's Tale (1st ed.). BBC Books. ISBN 978-1-84607-571-1.
- Davies, Russell T; Cook, Benjamin (14 January 2010). Doctor Who: The Writer's Tale: The Final Chapter (2nd ed.). BBC Books. ISBN 978-1-84607-861-3.
