= Yanto Jones =

Yanto Jones may refer to:

- Yanto Jones, fictional character in the TV series Mine All Mine
- A common misspelling of Ianto Jones, a character in the TV series Torchwood
