= Breakfast Serials =

1990 British children's television series

- Genre: Children's anthology
- Written by: Russell T Davies; The Salad Pig (David Green, Stuart Smith, Andrew Wilcott, Martin Raynor, Darren Bradley)

Production
- Producer: Russell T Davies

Original release
- Network: BBC1
- Release: 22 September – 29 December 1990

Breakfast Serials is a twenty-five-minute anthology series for children that aired on BBC1 for one series in 1990.

== Format ==
The series comprised various shorts that were based on a variety of genres such as dialogue comedy (Cheapo TV), drama (Runners and NiceChap), stand-up comedy (Zounds) and narrative (Single Tales).

Each serial would be prefaced by a conversation between a puppet Teapot, a Tin can, and a Tomato (known as The Kitchen Crew). On occasion, they would interact with the serial characters. The final discussion of the overall episode would lead to a song performed by all three that would play over the end credits.

All voices and acting roles/guises in the series were performed by Caroline Berry, John Biggins, Lucy Jenkins and William Petrie.

== Nice Chap ==
One segment of the show was Nice Chap, an adventure/drama about a cartoon strip character that is brought to life. The serial comprised three "series", each connected in continuity, but could also be viewed as stand-alone storylines

Nice Chap: "Nice Chap", a permanently positive, curious man-child who speaks in rhyme, is the creation of a depressed and lonesome female illustrator (Suzie, creator of Cozicomix). Suzie's only friends are plants, one of which is a yucca named Peter. Nice Chap is brought to life when a bolt of lightning strikes Suzie's drawing board. The two are placed in mortal danger by a rival comics company (Megacomix), managed by Joyce (nicknamed "Clench") and Norris and manned by a megalomaniacal supercomputer (It) and at least one other computer (Chuck). Clench and Norris become friends with Suzie at the end.

Nice Chap 2: Six months later the Supercomputer takes control of Norris and lays siege to a television station which is known as 'Norris Vision'. Nice Chap and Suzie foil its plans and all returns to normal.

Nice Chap 3: Another six months later on the anniversary of his first coming to life Nice Chap himself is turned evil when his creator, in a fit of anger, draws dark eyebrows on him. At the serial's conclusion, The renegade Nice Chap is killed by a doppelganger and his creator gives in to her despair, using a device called a Crash Machine to send herself into Nice Chap's dimension to be with a positive version of him forever.

== Critical reaction ==
TV Cream was critical, calling Cheapo TV "unfunny TV parodies" and Zounds "terrible drama school style surrealism", and criticising other strands for boredom or lack of originality.
