= Mine All Mine =

- Written by: Russell T Davies
- Starring: Griff Rhys Jones; Matthew Barry; Debbie Chazen; Ruth Madoc; Jo Stone-Fewings; Jason Hughes; Rhian Morgan; Siwan Morris; Joanna Page; Ri Richards; Gareth David-Lloyd; Sharon Morgan
- Composer: Murray Gold
- Country of origin: United Kingdom
- Original language: English
- No. of series: 1
- No. of episodes: 6

Production
- Executive producer: Nicola Shindler
- Producer: Ann Harrison-Baxter
- Production locations: Swansea, Wales
- Running time: 60 min (including adverts)
- Production company: Red Production Company

Original release
- Network: ITV
- Release: 25 November – 23 December 2004

Mine All Mine is a British television drama series produced by Red Production Company for ITV. It was written by Russell T Davies and starred Griff Rhys Jones. The story takes place in Swansea, Wales.

== Overview ==
Rhys Jones plays Max Vivaldi, an eccentric taxi driver and family man who has gone through life believing that the land upon which the Welsh city of Swansea was built belonged to an ancestor of his and therefore Swansea technically belongs to him. This was based on the tale of the Welsh pirate Robert Edwards and his descendants' claim to real estate in Lower Manhattan, New York City.

He possesses a document that he claims proves this to be the case, although nobody believes him. When an antiquities expert from London is dispatched to the Vivaldi home to appraise an antique telephone, the document proving Max's inheritance is authenticated as real and thus begins the process of Vivaldi attempting to exercise control over the city that is rightly his.

Mine All Mine consisted of four forty-five-minute episodes and one 90 minute finale. However, this was edited down from a longer six-part version, the full content of which is available on the DVD release. On the commentary track for the DVD, writer Russell T Davies explains that most of episode five was cut to make it the right length for broadcast.

The series aired in the United States on BBC America and in Asia on BBC Entertainment.
