= Robert Edwards (pirate) =

Welsh buccaneer

Robert Edwards (supposedly died c.1738) was a Welsh buccaneer who descendants claim was given 77 acres (310,000 m^{2}) of largely unsettled Manhattan by Queen Anne of the Kingdom of Great Britain for his services in disrupting Spanish sea lanes. Edwards is said to have leased his New York property to the brothers John and George Cruger for 99 years, with the understanding that it would revert to his heirs after the lease expired in 1877. No distribution to Edwards' heirs of the land was ever made. It is alleged that the Crugers were wardens of Trinity Church, an Episcopal Church—today, one of New York City's biggest land owners. Maybe everything was tangled in a muddle of colonial Manhattan land giveaways. But, according to the alleged lease document, the whole tract wound up in Trinity's hands.

Trinity indeed holds a large slice of the land that seems to be described in the Edwards family account. But the church got the last of the ground in 1705, all of it directly from Queen Anne, according to a church pamphlet published in 1955, at a time when Trinity was bedeviled by Edwards family claims.

The legend has since proved persistent, and indeed some high-profile claims of rightful ownership to the fortune, now estimated to be worth around 650 billion dollars. The most recent of these was a claim from Cleoma Foore, whose research led to the foundation of the Pennsylvania Association of Edwards Heirs, a body funded by donations in a bid to finally prove that they were entitled to the vast fortune through direct ancestry. In 1994, the association claimed that the profits from Edwards' lease were held in an account at Chase Manhattan Bank and were estimated to be valued at $27 billion; however, a spokesman for the bank stated that there was no such account; the bank's total American deposits were $40 billion, making it "preposterous" that a single account held $27 billion; and the bank had not even been founded until 1799, 19 years after Edwards' supposed death. The association's fund attracted around $1.5 million at its peak, but no firm evidence was forthcoming. Indeed, the end result was an embezzlement case tried at the federal court in Pittsburgh before Chief Judge Donald E. Ziegler in 1999.

More recently, this ancient claim has been the subject of many multimedia productions including books, TV shows and radio reports and a 1998 primetime UK TV show called "Find a Fortune" and hosted by Carol Vorderman among others, attempting to shed new light on the topic.

A document held at the Glamorgan Record Office in Cardiff, Wales, entitled "The Edwards Millions" outlines the case as it stood in 2002, with claims and counter claims further muddying the issue. Tales of unscrupulous lawyers and fraudulent claims have also hampered attempts by amateur researchers to get to the truth. Finally, the statute of limitations in New York, which sets a time limit for all claims to be commenced within fifteen years of the expiration of a lease, appears to have all but buried the claim many years ago. The only document that could prove the matter would be the original of the 99-year lease signed over to the brothers Cruger, but that would now be statute barred.

According to Paul Collins, the lease was likely a practical joke forged in 1880 by E.F. Williamson, a lifelong hoaxer. Williamson owned a pew in Trinity Church and was eventually imprisoned for harassing its rector Morgan Dix with a weeks-long prank.
