= List of Scott & Bailey episodes =

Scott & Bailey is a British television programme detailing the personal and professional lives of Detectives Janet Scott (Lesley Sharp) and Rachel Bailey (Suranne Jones), both of whom work for the Syndicate 9 Major Incident Team of the fictional Manchester Metropolitan Police, a murder investigation squad headed by successive senior investigators DCI Gill Murray (Amelia Bullmore) and DSI Julie Dodson (Pippa Haywood). The series debuted on 29 May 2011 and concluded on 27 April 2016.

== Series overview ==
Series	Episodes	Originally released		Average viewers (millions)
Series	Episodes	First released	Last released	Average viewers (millions)
1	6	29 May 2011	3 July 2011	7.74 (Note: Based from the consolidated ratings from the first series for ITV, including the ITV HD simulcast and ITV+1)
2	8	12 March 2012	30 April 2012	6.94 (Note: Based from the consolidated ratings from the second series for ITV, including the ITV HD simulcast and ITV+1)
3	8	3 April 2013	23 May 2013	6.86 (Note: Based from the consolidated ratings from the third series for ITV, including the ITV HD simulcast and ITV+1)
4	8	10 September 2014	29 October 2014	5.73 (Note: Based from the consolidated ratings from the fourth series for ITV, including the ITV HD simulcast (for Ep 5–8) and ITV+1)
5	3	13 April 2016	27 April 2016	6.09 (Note: Based from the consolidated ratings from the fifth series for ITV, including the ITV HD simulcast (for Ep 3) and ITV+1)

== Episodes ==
=== Series 1 (2011) ===
No. overall	No. in series	Title	Directed by	Written by	Original release date	UK viewers (millions)
1	1	"Congratulations"	Sarah Pia Anderson	Sally Wainwright	29 May 2011	9.42 (Note: 8.31 million on ITV1, 801,000 on the ITV1 HD simulcast, and 310,000 on ITV1+1.)
The team are tasked with investigating the murder of 18-year-old Emel Yilmaz, a pregnant girl from Turkey whose death was made to resemble all the hallmarks of a suicide. The team initially suspect her husband, but after discovering a long-term affair with a jealous co-worker, Rachel's intuition and memory provides the final clue to nailing Emel's killer. Meanwhile, Rachel is angry at being dumped by married lover Nick, and Janet is approached by an old schoolfriend, Geoff, to reopen a cold case: the murder of his six-year-old sister more than twenty years ago.
2	2	"Surprise"	Sarah Pia Anderson	Sally Wainwright	5 June 2011	8.05 (Note: 6.99 million on ITV1, 640,000 on the ITV1 HD simulcast, and 417,000 on ITV1+1.)
The team are tasked with investigating the murder of housewife Susan Metcalfe, who was followed home from the theatre, brutally raped and then dumped in the boot of her own car in the middle of nowhere. House-to-house enquiries throw up a possible lead when one of Rachel's interviewees tries to run from her questioning. A search of his house also discovers bloody clothes that are soon linked to another murder. Meanwhile, Rachel discovers she is carrying Nick's child, and Janet, dreading her wedding anniversary party, presses on with the cold case of her slain schoolfriend.
3	3	"Personal"	Syd Macartney	Sally Wainwright	12 June 2011	6.95 (Note: 6.11 million on ITV1, 485,000 on the ITV1 HD simulcast, and 353,000 on ITV1+1.)
The team are in court for the trial of Georgios Stelikos, a man accused of the murder of one woman and the rape and torture of another. Many of the team were certain that Stelikos would be found guilty on a sole murder charge, but doubt DCI Murray's actions to throw a rape charge into the mix. When Nick is revealed to be the defending barrister, he uses unofficial information given to him by Rachel, and Rachel is horrified when Stelikos escapes conviction. Stelikos is later found dead, and it is up to the team to find his killer. Meanwhile, Rachel suffers a miscarriage.
4	4	"Execution"	Syd Macartney	Sally Wainwright	19 June 2011	7.24 (Note: 6.11 million on ITV1, 620,000 on the ITV1 HD simulcast, and 513,000 on ITV1+1.)
The team investigate the disappearance and possible murder of Gary Birkinshaw, after one of his colleagues reports him missing. His wife, well-known porn star Vicky Birkinshaw, is arrested on suspicion of her husband's murder – but the evidence fails to implicate her in any way, and instead points towards her shady new boyfriend and a paedophile who has been abusing her daughter. Meanwhile, Rachel's professional life hangs in the balance when DCI Murray finds out that her relationship with Nick Savage could have put the Stelikos case at risk.
5	5	"Faultlines"	Ben Caron	Sally Wainwright	26 June 2011	7.28 (Note: 6.35 million on ITV1, 589,000 on the ITV1 HD simulcast, and 343,000 on ITV1+1.)
The team are tasked with investigating the murder of Lynn Stott, a 46-year-old mother who was murdered after attending a swimming club. As the team fail to crack the case, the review squad are brought in to take over. But after noticing that Lynn's murder bears a number of similarities to Veronica Hasting's murder, Janet is given two days leave to move closer to tracking down the killer. When Rachel discovers the killer's identity, Janet is put in grave danger, which results in her being stabbed and critically injured. Rachel finds out about an affair Nick had with a juror.
6	6	"Vendetta"	Ben Caron	Sally Wainwright	3 July 2011	7.49 (Note: 6.44 million on ITV1, 727,000 on the ITV1 HD simulcast, and 327,000 on ITV1+1.)
Janet returns to work after her recovery, and she is immediately thrown in at the deep end, investigating the shooting of 14-year-old Dylan Holwell who is found with half of his skull blown off in his own living room. As Rachel investigates a possible lead, she is narrowly missed by a fast-moving car, which veers past her, knocking down an innocent girl and crashing into a parked vehicle on the side of the road. She discovers that the driver was an associate of Carl Norris, and that the incident was unquestionably linked to the discovery of Nick's affair with a member of the jury.

=== Series 2 (2012) ===
No. overall	No. in series	Title	Directed by	Written by	Original release date	UK viewers (millions)
7	1	"Loyalty"	China Moo-Young	Sally Wainwright	12 March 2012	8.03 (Note: 6.96 million on ITV1, 651,000 on the ITV1 HD simulcast, and 413,000 on ITV1+1.)
The badly burnt body of disabled man Darren Rigby turns up in a remote part of Manchester, and a few days later, the corpse of businessman Keith Fleming is discovered. The team start to realise the victims were not just murdered, but tortured too – stabbed through the feet with a Phillips screwdriver. As the team make an arrest, it becomes clear their investigation has just scratched the surface. Meanwhile, Janet throws her husband, Ade, out of the house following a row with her mother, and Rachel's estranged brother, Dominic, turns up on her doorstep. The police arrest a woman, Nadia, who was seen on CCTV with Keith Fleming. A phonebox caller informs the police that Nadia isn't to blame before he's attacked.
8	2	"Secrets"	China Moo-Young	Sally Wainwright	19 March 2012	7.74 (Note: 6.74 million on ITV1, 647,000 on the ITV1 HD simulcast, and 355,000 on ITV1+1.)
The body found beside the phone box is none-other than Nadia's brother, Aaron. Using Aaron's death as leverage, the team finally break down the wall of silence maintained by their four murder suspects and uncover the shockingly banal truth behind the killings. But without cast-iron evidence to identify the actual murderers, Gill is forced to charge all four suspects. Meanwhile, Rachel cannot fight her attraction to Sean, but will she regret her actions? Janet tries to keep her private life secret, but Taisie spills the beans to Andy at Rachel's birthday celebrations.
9	3	"Pipe Dreams"	China Moo-Young	Sally Wainwright	26 March 2012	7.02 (Note: 6.13 million on ITV1, 546,000 on the ITV1 HD simulcast, and 345,000 on ITV1+1.)
Gill and Rachel go to Bristol to advise on a rape-and-murder case that bears striking similarities to an infamous case from thirteen years ago. At the time of the original investigation, Gill helped catch the perpetrator, Jeremy Leach. Leach was convicted for the rape and murder of four women, but now he is claiming that he is innocent. Another woman has been raped and killed using Leach's exact MO – could the real murderer still be out there? Meanwhile, Rachel catches her brother Dom in a compromising position with another man and advises him to go for an HIV test.
10	4	"Sacred Trust"	Paul Walker	Screenplay: Sally Wainwright; Idea: Nicole Taylor	2 April 2012	6.43
The team investigate when the body of eight-year-old Dylan Nichols is discovered in a wheelie bin, four days after his initial disappearance. But, as they search for the paedophile killer, they are unaware that the culprit has placed himself at the heart of the child's grieving family. Meanwhile, Dom's HIV test result is negative, but in his relief, he does something stupid which results in Rachel missing her sergeant's exam. Sean thinks that he and Rachel are destined to be together, while Janet is persuaded to give things a go with Andy, but finds herself having doubts over their future.
11	5	"Graves"	Paul Walker	Sally Wainwright	9 April 2012	6.70 (Note: 5.33 million on ITV1, 634,000 on the ITV1 HD simulcast, and 741,000 on ITV1+1.)
The team investigate the brutal, racially motivated murder of a 21-year-old taxi driver, who was killed after picking up fare outside a nearby public house. The trail leads to Darren Walcott, whose mobile phone records show that he telephoned several taxi companies before choosing his victim. Meanwhile, in an interview with Geoff Hastings, Janet learns much more than she bargained for, leaving Rachel to believe that the diaries containing information of his victims are buried in his mother's grave. Meanwhile, Sean pre-books his and Rachel's wedding without her consent.
12	6	"Mould"	Paul Walker	Sally Wainwright	16 April 2012	6.59
The team investigate the murder of teaching assistant Susan Bishop, whose body is found clothed in a policewoman's fancy dress outfit, and her face completely covered in green mould, indicating that she has been dead for some time – despite the fact that the pathologist gives a time of death only two-to-three days previously. Gill suspects that Susan's lover may be responsible for her death, but there is no shortage of suspects. Meanwhile, Rachel struggles with Sean's latest surprise.
13	7	"Sidelines"	Morag Fullarton	Amelia Bullmore	23 April 2012	6.55 (Note: 5.46 million on ITV1, 512,000 on the ITV1 HD simulcast, and 575,000 on ITV1+1.)
The team investigate the murder of 18-year-old student Leon Foster, whose death looks like a typical gang killing at first glance – but the discovery that he was sexually mutilated raises suspicions that his murder could be domestic. Investigating a tight-knit group of friends from his estate, the team discover that the motive behind the murder may be a 'Line-Up' involving a twelve-year-old boy. Andy punishes Janet by sidelining her on the investigation into Leon's death. Meanwhile, Janet confides in Gill about Andy's behaviour after a public outburst in front of the team, and Sean surprises Rachel when he tells her that he has been in contact with her estranged mother.
14	8	"Divided Loyalties"	Morag Fullarton	Sally Wainwright	30 April 2012	6.44 (Note: 5.25 million on ITV1, 528,000 on the ITV1 HD simulcast, and 669,000 on ITV1+1.)
Superintendent Dodson of Syndicate 3 is tasked with investigating the brutal assault of Nick Savage. Scared and unable to remember what happened, Rachel struggles to convince herself that she did not do it, and at the top of the list of suspects, finds herself desperately scrambling to clear her name. Meanwhile, thinking that she has made peace with Andy, Janet is shocked to discover that he has given her misinformation which causes Gill to miss an appointment. Unable to find out who is responsible, Gill tells Janet and Andy that one of them will have to leave the syndicate.

=== Series 3 (2013) ===
No. overall	No. in series	Title	Directed by	Written by	Original release date	UK viewers (millions)
15	1	"Vulnerable"	Morag Fullarton	Sally Wainwright	3 April 2013	7.74 (Note: 6.53 million on ITV1, 757,000 on the ITV1 HD simulcast, and 456,000 on ITV1+1.)
Janet and the team investigate the gruesome murder of elderly Eunice Bevan, who died in squalor with her bed-ridden husband languishing nearby. Digging deep into the family history, they discover that out of Eunice's four children, they can only locate Helen Bartlett, who changed her name after leaving the family home thirty years previously. As a tangled web of sustained abuse begins to rise to the surface, Janet discovers that Eunice's bed-ridden husband is not as ill as he makes out. Meanwhile, Janet ponders her next move following the breakdown of her marriage.
16	2	"Things We Do For Love"	Morag Fullarton	Sally Wainwright	10 April 2013	6.85 (Note: 5.71 million on ITV1, 694,000 on the ITV1 HD simulcast, and 446,000 on ITV1+1.)
We return to the events of twelve months ago, where, following her brother's escape from custody, Rachel finds herself under fire. After clearing her name, the police manage to locate Dom, who claims that Rachel incited him to murder Nick Savage – and she is again arrested on suspicion of murder. With her impending marriage to Sean, Rachel tries to assess how the situation became so bad. Meanwhile, in the present day, Rachel and Janet are on the tail of businessman Adam Armitage, who is accused of the death of a homeless man with whom he brawled.
17	3	"Thin Ice"	Morag Fullarton	Sally Wainwright	17 April 2013	6.05 (Note: 5.44 million on ITV1, and 611,000 on the ITV1 HD simulcast,)
The team investigate the murder of Edward Gallagher, who is found on his kitchen floor with his throat cut. The victim having a passion for rent boys and a fiery relationship with his family, Janet and Rachel find many motives for murder – but are already treading on thin ice. Pete's eye-witness account from a neighbour is called into question when his statement doesn't match how Pete initially announced his evidence. Meanwhile, Rachel's infidelity nearly catches her out, Janet asks Dorothy to move in with her, and Gill is shocked when her son announces he is marrying his fiancée.
18	4	"Cradle"	Juliet May	Sally Wainwright	24 April 2013	6.83 (Note: 5.69 million on ITV1, 686,000 on the ITV1 HD simulcast, and 453,000 on ITV1+1.)
The team investigate when the vulnerable Helen Bartlett approaches Janet, only to reveal that the body of her long-lost brother is buried in the cellar of the family home. As her revelation sparks spiraling consequences for all involved, an excavation of the site reveals the remains of a total of seven bodies. DSI Julie Dodson of Syndicate 3 is brought in to head up the investigation, but immediately suspects a mole when information is leaked to the press. Meanwhile, new DS Rob Waddington is thrown in at the deep end, making Janet regret not going for the sergeant's job.
19	5	"Witness"	Juliet May	Sally Wainwright	1 May 2013	6.63 (Note: 5.37 million on ITV1, 621,000 on the ITV1 HD simulcast, and 643,000 on ITV1+1.)
The team manage to identify one of the skeletons found in the cellar as Steven Norgove, an 18-year-old hitchhiker who stayed with the Bevan family for a short period in the 1970s. A further search of the house uncovers the remains of a young female in the floorboards of the master bedroom, who is later identified as Sheila Bevan, Joe and Eunice's eldest daughter. As the identification of the skeletons found beneath the Bevan home spirals into a shocking tale from thirty-five years ago, Janet is forced to comfort Pete after his wife leaves him, and Rachel calls time on her marriage.
20	6	"Undermined"	Juliet May	Amelia Bullmore	8 May 2013	6.99 (Note: 5.68 million on ITV1, 704,000 on the ITV1 HD simulcast, and 601,000 on ITV1+1.)
The team investigate allegations of abuse in a retirement home when elderly resident Gerald French is found dead in his bedroom, with signs pointing towards the possibility that he has been murdered. As the team dig deeper, they discover that senior care assistant Craig Wyatt has framed vulnerable junior assistant Rosie Clarke, and Janet and Rachel set out to prove his guilt. Meanwhile, Dorothy is beginning to tire of having Rachel stay overnight, but Janet turns a blind eye to it all until she catches Rachel and Kevin having sex in the bedroom after a night out.
21	7	"Wrong Place, Wrong Time"	Morag Fullarton	Amelia Bullmore	22 May 2013	6.65 (Note: 5.37 million on ITV1, 706,000 on the ITV1 HD simulcast, and 570,000 on ITV1+1.)
The team investigate the death of Kenneth Valentine, who is found at the bottom of a flight of stairs at the rear of business premises in the town centre. When it is established that he could not have fallen due to the incorrect positioning of the body, the team investigate who could be responsible for murder. Syndicate 9 is left reeling when the mole who has been leaking information to the press is uncovered, but Janet and Rachel have bigger problems to deal with following Janet's discovery the previous night, which threatens their friendship and their working relationship.
22	8	"Futures"	Morag Fullarton	Sally Wainwright	23 May 2013	7.10 (Note: 5.76 million on ITV1, 724,000 on the ITV1 HD simulcast, and 615,000 on ITV1+1.)
The team are placed on standby when it emerges that Gill has been kidnapped by Helen Bartlett at knifepoint, and her plans are to commit suicide – and take Gill with her. Gill uses all her powers of persuasion to brave out the situation, trying to gauge exactly what Helen's motives for murder are, and exactly where they are headed. At the station, Rachel and Janet's fall-out results in every small task becoming problematic, but they have to unite when they hear what Gill is going through.

=== Series 4 (2014) ===
No. overall	No. in series	Title	Directed by	Written by	Original release date	UK viewers (millions)
23	1	"Superficial"	Simon Delaney	Amelia Bullmore	10 September 2014	5.70 (Note: 4.95 million on ITV1, and 750,000 on ITV1+1.)
A pub landlord reports one of his young employees missing when he fails to turn up for work. When a photo of him bound and gagged in the boot of a car appears on Facebook, the team suspect that he might be dead. A car they think the victim drove turns up in a quarry, and a search there uncovers a decomposing corpse, which Gill believes to be that of a missing person from several years back. Meanwhile, with Rob's departure imminent, Gill has to choose either Janet or Rachel for the position of sergeant within Syndicate 9.
24	2	"Tough Love"	Simon Delaney	Amelia Bullmore	17 September 2014	5.45 (Note: 4.74 million on ITV1, and 706,000 on ITV1+1.)
The corpse found during the quarry search is identified as the missing person Gill had in mind, Mandy Sweeting. It is Rob's last week at Syndicate 9, but he finds himself particularly on edge because his father had investigated Mandy's disappearance, and the file suggests that the investigation was handled badly. Although the victim's husband had been the only suspect, Rachel suspects that there is more to the case than meets the eye. Rachel adjusts to the role of sergeant. Janet confides in her that she is tired of being single.
25	3	"Damaged"	Simon Delaney	Lee Warburton	24 September 2014	5.28 (Note: 4.80 million on ITV1, and 484,000 on ITV1+1.)
The team investigates the murder of a gay man, Rich Hutchings, who was found in the flat he shared with his husband. The couple's homophobic neighbour becomes the prime suspect, but evidence uncovered not long thereafter suggests that it may not have been a hate crime; soon another suspect is in the frame. Rachel's mother shows up, asking for her help again, because her current boyfriend is violent with her. Rachel is torn between her professional responsibilities. Janet's first date goes less than swimmingly.
26	4	"A Matter of Rank"	Noreen Kershaw	Emily Ballou	1 October 2014	5.25 (Note: 4.68 million on ITV1, and 570,000 on ITV1+1.)
The team investigates the murder of Lola Lake, who was found in a hotel known to be frequented by prostitutes. They soon learn that she was there to meet a man who had contacted her via a personal-ad website, but the man in question had given a false name. When an earlier victim comes forward to make a statement, Rachel pieces together the clues and a prime suspect is identified. Janet later witnesses the suspect's confession as he is brought into custody. A drunken Gill reveals to Rachel that she was second choice for sergeant.
27	5	"Neglect"	Noreen Kershaw	Lee Warburton	8 October 2014	5.91 (Note: 4.77 million on ITV1, 590,000 on ITV HD simulcast and 602,000 on ITV1+1.)
The team investigate the death of a young baby, who was admitted to A&E with injuries which do not match his parents' explanation of events. It soon transpires that at the time the injuries occurred, the baby was not in the care of his parents but with two childminders of whom the parents have less than fruitful opinions. When it is discovered that cocaine may be related to the baby's injuries, the mother comes under investigation. Meanwhile, Rachel's relationship with Will Pemberton heats up as he uses his powers to get her on a Vice initiative.
28	6	"Professional Divide"	Noreen Kershaw	Emily Ballou	15 October 2014	5.84 (Note: 4.64 million on ITV1, 670,000 on ITV HD simulcast and 530,000 on ITV1+1.)
The team investigate the double murder of a pub landlord and his wife, who were both savagely attacked in what appears to be a robbery gone wrong. The discovery of the couple's long-lost daughter throws up more than a few motives when she is seen entering a crack den and conversing with a known drug dealer. Her drug-induced state leaves her unfit for interview, but when her parents' car is found, it looks like her fate has been sealed. Meanwhile, Janet's daughter fights a crush for her step-brother and Will Pemberton ends his relationship with Rachel.
29	7	"Fatal Error"	Neasa Hardiman	Amelia Bullmore	22 October 2014	5.93 (Note: 4.70 million on ITV1, 630,000 on ITV HD simulcast and 604,000 on ITV1+1.)
The body of a man who disappeared 15 years previously is found on the moors adjacent to a local farm, and the farm and its employees immediately come under suspicion. Rachel's inexperience as sergeant comes to a head when she makes a fatal error, leaving both Janet and Chris in grave danger. Gill announces that she has just 30 days until her retirement, but a concerned Janet reports Gill's booze problem to Superintendent Dodson of Syndicate 3, and when Gill finds out, she is livid.
30	8	"Lost Loyalty"	Neasa Hardiman	Amelia Bullmore	29 October 2014	6.47 (Note: 5.09 million on ITV1, 780,00 on ITV HD simulcast and 597,000 on ITV1+1.)
The discovery of slaves on the Pritchards' farm brings the investigation into completely new territory. Janet is under internal investigation following the fatal collision and is left unable to speak to the dead man's widow, but finds solace with Chris. Gill is accused of being drunk on the job, Superintendent Dodson is forced to try and prevent the case from being discredited and has to put her friendship with Gill on the line in order to assess Gill's capability as the senior officer of Syndicate 9.

=== Series 5 (2016) ===
No. overall	No. in series	Title	Directed by	Written by	Original release date	UK viewers (millions)
31	1	"Ghost"	Alex Kalymnios	Lee Warburton	13 April 2016	6.18 (Note: 28 day data: 5.69 million on ITV, and 489,000 on ITV+1.)
Rachel returns from her secondment to Vice to head up the investigation into a serial killer who is leaving clues at every crime scene. Aware that her new role as SIO is causing friction within the team, Rachel looks to Janet for guidance, but with her daughter having been arrested for possession of indecent images of a child, her mind is elsewhere. As tech manage to break down the firewall and access a website where videos and images of the victims are being placed, Rachel realises that two offenders are baiting one another to kill – and that another potential victim has been highlighted, and the team must find her before she comes to any harm. When a leak offers up information about the case, it leads to a series of hoax postings on the website, leading the team to miss vital clues to another potential victim which has been highlighted by one of the killers.
32	2	"Nobody's Fool"	Alex Kalymnios	Lee Warburton	20 April 2016	5.45 (Note: 28 day data: 4.98 million on ITV, and 474,000 on ITV+1.)
Rachel realises that the team are slowly running out of evidence to hold either of their prime suspects in custody. The mother of the latest victim berates the team for missing the signs that led to her son's death, leading Mitch to reveal to Rachel that the loss of his daybook may have resulted in the press leak. Meanwhile, Janet acts as an appropriate adult as the Sex Crimes unit continue to interrogate her daughter. Tech manage to pinpoint the address where the latest victim was posted on the website, but it turns out that the homeowner is nothing more than an internet troll, who posted the picture on someone else's instruction. Meanwhile, when Rachel orders Janet and Mitch to re-arrest Kenny Medford on the grounds of further evidence, she unwittingly sets in motion a chain of events which threatens to change the dynamic of the team forever.
33	3	"Change"	Alex Kalymnios	Lee Warburton	27 April 2016	6.65 (Note: 28 day data: 5.05 million on ITV, 1.15 million on ITV HD simulcast and 447,000 on ITV+1.)
Rachel's dogged pursuit of Steve Dench leads him to finally open up in interview. Credit card information on Dench's possible accomplice leads the team to a coffee shop, where they lie in wait to capture their prey during his morning routine stop. Although he confirms he was present at the scene of the first tagging, he denies being involved. Meanwhile, Alison telephones Rachel in a blind panic after finding one of the killer's white stars on the wall outside their house. Dodson is also furious to discover that Rachel is pregnant and has not declared it. As Dench continues to open up to Janet, Rachel receives a distress call from Jenna Mawson, leading her to a tense meeting at Victoria Station, where she comes face-to-face with the killer. Will Rachel manage to evade capture until backup arrives? Or is the fate of her and her unborn baby in jeopardy?

== Home video releases ==
Series	Episodes	DVD release dates			
Series	Episodes	Region 2 (United Kingdom)	Region 1 (United States)	Region 4 (Australia)	Discs
1	6	4 July 2011	17 June 2014	3 November 2011	2
2	8	4 June 2012	16 September 2014	7 November 2012	2
3	8	1 July 2013	5 May 2015	4 December 2013	2
4	8	10 November 2014	15 March 2016	25 February 2015	2
5	3	2 May 2016	11 October 2016	14 September 2016	1
1–5	33	TBA	2 May 2016	9 November 2016	9
