= Carla Henry =

British actress

Carla Henry is a British actress, most famous for her role as Donna Clarke in Queer as Folk. She trained at Bretton Hall College.

Her performances in stage productions such as Storm (Contact Theatre) and Habitat (Royal Exchange) and On the Shore of the Wide World have seen her tackle a wide variety of roles. She played Kristin in the 2012 production of Miss Julie alongside Maxine Peake, Joe Armstrong and Liam Gerrard at the Royal Exchange Theatre in Manchester and was nominated for a best supporting actress award in the Manchester Theatre Awards

She played Castiza in Alex Cox's film Revengers Tragedy and also appeared in his television film I'm A Juvenile Delinquent - Jail Me!. In 2013 she appeared in the BBC One drama series Frankie.

== Selected theatre credits ==
- Romeo & Juliet (Birmingham Rep)
- On the Shore of the Wide World (Manchester Royal Exchange/National Theatre) (2005)
- Wedding Cane (Manchester Royal Exchange)
- Habitat (Manchester Royal Exchange)
- Thérèse Raquin (Glasgow Citizens)
- The Storm (Contact Theatre)
- Hansel and Gretel (Lyric Hammersmith)
- The Pleasure Man (Glasgow Citizens)
- Miss Julie (Manchester Royal Exchange) (2012)
- Our Town (Royal Exchange, Manchester) (2017)
- Birth (Royal Exchange, Manchester) (2017)

== Selected television and film credits ==
- Moving On
- Scott and Bailey
- Home Front
- Frankie
- Revenger's Tragedy
- I'm A juvenile delinquent jail me
- Black Work
