= Frankie (TV series) =

- Genre: Drama
- Created by: Lucy Gannon
- Starring: Eve Myles; Dean Lennox Kelly; Derek Riddell; Julia Ford; Carla Henry; Leila Mimmack; Jemma Redgrave
- Country of origin: United Kingdom
- Original language: English
- No. of series: 1
- No. of episodes: 6

Production
- Executive producer: Hilary Salmon
- Running time: 60 minutes
- Production company: BBC

Original release
- Network: BBC One
- Release: 14 May – 18 June 2013

Frankie is a British six-part television drama series created by Lucy Gannon. The series stars Eve Myles as Frankie Maddox, a district nurse more emotionally involved with her job than her personal life. The series is both set and filmed in the English city of Bristol.

== Overview ==
The series was first announced in May 2012 alongside three other new commissions for BBC One and BBC Three. Kate Harwood, the controller of drama series and serials for the corporation described the new drama commissions as "a tribute to the huge range of creativity and talent within the in-house drama teams in both London and Salford". An initial synopsis described the series as "a modern and redemptive" introspection of the life of a district nurse "whose patients matter more to her than her personal life". Further information was released in September in a BBC press release that described the aim of the series as "to build up a portrayal of the challenging, complex and ultimately life affirming world of district nursing". Writer and creator Lucy Gannon wrote that she was "thrilled to be writing about strong modern people [...] who all - whatever their flaws, are determined to make a difference, to make life better". The series is executive produced by Hilary Salmon, produced by Erika Hossington and directed by Mark Everest. It consists of six sixty-minute episodes, both set and filmed in the English city of Bristol. In July 2013, Gannon confirmed that the show would not be returning for a second series.

== Cast ==
- Eve Myles as Frankie Maddox the lead district nurse at the Community Nurse's Office
- Dean Lennox Kelly as Ian Hargrave, Frankie's long-term boyfriend
- Derek Riddell as Andy Peat
- Jemma Redgrave as Doctor Zoe Evans, a partner in the Community Nurse's Office
- Julia Ford as Mary McCloud
- Leila Mimmack as Paula Simms
- Noma Dumezweni as Angie Rascoe
- Carla Henry as Karen Freestone
- Ben Owen-Jones as Matthew Seren, the schedule coordinator

Eve Myles' casting in the titular role was announced in September 2012. Myles described Frankie as "a vibrant woman trying to live life in the fast lane and juggle a job" who is "an infectious character" insofar as she is "electric" and "quirky". Dean Lennox Kelly stars as Ian Hargrave, Frankie's long-term boyfriend, while Derek Riddell plays Andy Peat, a colleague and confidant. The cast also includes Jemma Redgrave as Dr Zoe Evans, Julia Ford as Mary McCloud, Leila Mimmack as Paula Simms, Noma Dumezweni as Angie Rascoe, and Carla Henry as Karen Freestone.

== Episodes ==
No.	Episode	Directed by	Written by	Original release date	UK viewers (millions)
1	"Episode 1"	Mark Everest	Lucy Gannon	14 May 2013	5.32
Frankie is concerned that Jean is unable to look after her mentally declining father as well as caring for her terminally ill husband and ruins her own birthday party as well as Ian's plans, when she places the welfare of a young girl and her expecting mother above her own. Out of anger, Ian then does something he lives to regret.
2	"Episode 2"	Mark Everest	Lucy Gannon	21 May 2013	4.76
Ian's reconciliation with Frankie seems unlikely when she discovers that he was unfaithful the night of her birthday party. However, she has even bigger problems when Dr Evans starts up a vendetta against her, believing that Frankie's actions assisted a husband in helping his wife commit suicide. Also, Paula feels guilty about being Ian's one night stand, especially when Karen blurts out that she was with someone after Frankie's party.
3	"Episode 3"	Alice Troughton	Lucy Gannon	29 May 2013	4.11
The team welcome the new team leader, Matt, causes a few raised eyebrows as he comes with unorthodox methods to motivating the nurses. Frankie has been suspended until Dr Evans' allegations have been investigated, but she fights back and returns to work when one of her patients' family suffers a crisis. However, it worsens Frankie's case when a load of drugs go missing and she looks responsible for leaving them lying about. Andy tries to help a wife reconnect with her husband after she receives major surgery.
4	"Episode 4"	Alice Troughton	Lucy Catherine	4 June 2013	4.71
Frankie treats a woman undergoing IVF and considers taking Ian back if he can prove his commitment to her. Paula, however, has shocking news in store. Meanwhile, Andy is forced to intervene in the domestic crisis of his patient and her teenage daughter.
5	"Episode 5"	Ashley Way	Peter McKenna	11 June 2013	4.85
Someone is watching Frankie, but who - and why? At work, Frankie finds herself caught between her patient and his wife. A dying patient puts things into perspective for Paula.
6	"Episode 6"	Ashley Way	Lucy Gannon	18 June 2013	4.98
Frankie's stalker behaves ever more strangely, deeply unsettling her. It has gone beyond a joke. Andy and Ian are thrown together as a result of a vicious dog attack, and they cement their rivalry for Frankie's heart. Who will Frankie choose?
