= Insiders (British TV series) =

British television series

- Genre: Drama
- Written by: Lucy Gannon
- Directed by: Danny Hiller
- Starring: Julia Ford; Robert Cavanah; Adrian Rawlins; Nick Bagnall; Idris Elba; Ron Emslie; James Warrior
- Composer: Stewart Copeland
- Country of origin: United Kingdom
- Original language: English
- No. of series: 1
- No. of episodes: 6

Production
- Producer: Nicholas Brown
- Cinematography: Chris Howard; Rory Taylor
- Editor: John Richards
- Running time: 50 minutes
- Production company: BBC Worldwide

Original release
- Network: BBC1
- Release: 19 February – 26 March 1997

Insiders is a six-part British television drama series, created and written by playwright Lucy Gannon, that first broadcast on BBC1 on 19 February 1997. The series stars Julia Ford, Robert Cavanah and Adrian Rawlins, and follows life inside an open prison in London. The series was directed entirely by Danny Hiller.

The series broadcast over six consecutive weeks, with the concluding episode on 26 March 1997. The series is yet to be released on DVD.

== Cast ==
- Julia Ford as Annie Whitby
- Robert Cavanah as Gerry Cosmo
- Adrian Rawlins as Woody Pine
- Nick Bagnall as Pat Symcox
- Idris Elba as Robinson Bennett
- Ron Emslie as Phillip Kennedy
- James Warrior as Colin Figgs
- Graham Turner as Binny Edwards
- Race Davies as Emma Davies
- Kaylee Anne Price as Baby Girl

== Production ==
The series was described by the BBC as "touching", with the premise listed as "a series that follows a number of inmates, contrasting their chequered life and predicament with those of the staff."

== Episodes ==
No.	Title	Directed by	Written by	Original release date
1	"The VAT Man"	Danny Hiller	Lucy Gannon	19 February 1997
As two new arrivals try to come to terms with their new environment, dislike develops into open hostility.
2	"Soft Touch"	Danny Hiller	Lucy Gannon	26 February 1997
A new prisoner's pursuit of freedom threatens both Annie's career and his chances of staying out of closed prison.
3	"Guilty"	Danny Hiller	Lucy Gannon	5 March 1997
Driving to give the last rites to a dying woman, a Roman Catholic priest knocks down and kills a young boy. Sentenced to four years, he is consumed with guilt, while the boy's father confronts his own anger.
4	"Offending Behaviour"	Danny Hiller	Lucy Gannon	12 March 1997
The politics and relationships of the dormitory are overturned by the arrival of a new inmate.
5	"Good Behaviour"	Danny Hiller	Lucy Gannon	19 March 1997
Binny Edwards is on the eve of his release when his mother dies. Ignored by his welfare officer, he is unprepared for life on the outside.
6	"Exposure"	Danny Hiller	Lucy Gannon	26 March 1997
Woody gets his promotion, but the revelation of a family secret threatens his career. Meanwhile, the publication of a government white paper leads to unwelcome press coverage of Vernemoor.
