= Hope and Glory (TV series) =

British television drama series

- DVD cover
- Genre: Drama
- Created by: Lucy Gannon
- Directed by: Juliet May and others
- Starring: Lenny Henry; Amanda Redman; Clive Russell; Gillian Kearney
- Theme music composer: Nick Bicât
- Country of origin: United Kingdom
- Original language: English
- No. of series: 3
- No. of episodes: 16

Production
- Executive producers: Mal Young and Lucy Gannon
- Producer: Nicolas Brown
- Running time: 50 minutes

Original release
- Network: BBC One
- Release: 22 June 1999 – 5 November 2000

Hope and Glory is a BBC television drama about a comprehensive school struggling with financial, staffing and disciplinary problems, and faced with closure. It starred Lenny Henry as maverick "Superhead" Ian George, enlisted to turn around the school's fortunes.

It was created by Lucy Gannon, who had previously created Soldier Soldier, and was inspired by a real head teacher named William Atkinson, who had turned around a secondary school in London which had been placed into special measures.

== Plot ==
Ian George, the head of an exclusive school, is asked to take a look at Hope Park Comprehensive School, which is in special measures, and asked to confirm its closure. When he visits the school, he's greeted by disaffected students and teachers alike. The sixth form centre lies derelict after being torched a few years previously, while the music room is full of untouched expensive equipment, because the school could not attract a music teacher. The outgoing head (Peter Davison) breaks down during his farewell speech and delivers an emotional rant against the students, telling them how worthless they are.

After meeting staff and pupils, in particular pupil Keeley Porter and Deputy Head Debbie "Debs" Bryan (Redman), George believes there is some hope for the school. He is offered help by the chair of governors, Derek, whose son died young and would have been at the school. Ian turns down a government job to take over as the new Head.

With the help of "Debs", George is able to fix the school's issues. He identifies the talents of rebellious students, and the music equipment is finally used.

Romances developed between Ian and Debs, and Tony (Lee Warburton) and Sally (Sara Stephens).

Philip Whitchurch played the chair of governors, who was desperate to save the school. The refurbished and replenished library was subsequently dedicated to his deceased son. The Chief Education Officer was played by Richard Griffiths.

== Cast ==
- Lenny Henry as Ian George, headteacher
- Amanda Redman as Debbie "Debs" Bryan (series 1- 2), Maths teacher (series 1), Deputy Headteacher (Series 1-2)
- Sara Stephens as Sally Bell, Drama teacher (Series 1-3), Head of Sixth Form (Series 3)
- Philip Whitchurch as Dennis Hill (Series 1), Chair of Governors
- Clive Russell (series 1- 2) as Phil Jakes, Technology teacher and Deputy Head
- Ben Price (series 1) as Mark Jakes, Phil's oldest son
- Pippa Guard as Jan Woolley (series 1), Geography teacher
- Lee Warburton as Tony Elliott, PE teacher
- Gillian Kearney as Kitty Burton (series 2 and 3), English teacher.
- Gresby Nash as Matt Bennett (series 3), Music teacher and Deputy Headteacher
- Phyllis Logan as Annie Gilbert (series 3), Computing teacher and Deputy Headteacher
- Richard Griffiths as Leo Wheeldon (Series 2-3), LEA Chief Education Officer.
- Valerie Lilley as Elaine Rawlings, Ian George’s PA.
- Martin Trenaman as Mike Waters, Site Manager and Ian’s confidant.
- William Gaminara as Colin Ryan (Series 1), Ian’s best friend and Deputy Head at his former school. Series 1 ends with Ian announcing that Colin has accepted a 1-year secondment to Hope Park, but this does not happen on-screen.

== Production ==
Bushey Hall School in Watford, Francis Combe School in Watford and Langleybury School in Three Rivers, Hertfordshire, were used as locations for the school.

Classical music featured throughout the first series, and a compilation CD was released. An animated title sequence was introduced in series 2, with theme music composed by Nick Bicât and performed by the London Chamber Orchestra.

Gannon wrote the series with the intention that it would be transmitted at 8.00pm, before the watershed; however, the BBC instead scheduled it at 9.30pm.

== Episode guide ==
=== Series 1 ===
Episode number	Original airdate	Writer	#
1	22 June 1999	Lucy Gannon	1
Ian George (Lenny Henry), the head teacher of a successful private school, delivers a speech at a conference attacking government intervention in schools. Ian is tasked with inspecting Hope Park, an under-performing inner-city comprehensive school which has been recommended for closure. After spending time with staff and pupils, George also recommends closure; the chair of governors (Philip Whitchurch) offers George the headship, which he initially declines. However, when he witnesses the outgoing head teacher (Peter Davison) have a breakdown in a farewell assembly, Ian declares to the staff and pupils that he is their new head teacher.
2	29 June 1999	Lucy Gannon	2
With the new term approaching, Ian George and his team work to install new equipment and desks, the latter without the governors' permission. Deputy head Phil Jakes (Clive Russell) takes charge of installing a computer network, but is too proud to admit that he lacks the required technical knowledge. Having been impressed with her attitude and teaching, Ian appoints Debbie Bryan (Amanda Redman) as acting deputy head.
3	6 July 1999	Lucy Gannon	3
Ian George undergoes cardiac therapy to treat his heart condition. Geography teacher Jan Wooley's (Pippa Guard) timekeeping and attitude towards students is causing problems. In particular, she clashes with pupil Keely Porter (Sarah French), who requests to be moved to a different form group. When Debbie Bryan approves this transfer, Ian George protests that procedure had not been followed and insists the decision is reversed, even though Keely has been engaging well with drama teacher Sally Bell (Sara Stephens). A concert is held for parents, which Keely eventually plays a part in.
4	13 July 1999	Lucy Gannon	4
The romance between teachers Tony Elliott (Lee Warburton) and Sally develops. However, as they discuss their relationship in a storage room, commotion develops on a staircase, resulting in a child being injured. The incident coincides with Phil Jakes being in charge of the school while Ian George is off site. In transpires that Jakes had taught the father (Rob Jarvis) of the child who was injured, and had been responsible for his exclusion from school, leading to limitations in opportunities.
5	20 July 1999	Lucy Gannon	5
Jan Wooley's personal life continues to affect her performance at work. While invigilating an exam, she leaves the candidates unattended; Ian George invokes disciplinary procedures. Jan is delighted to discover that she pregnant; however, her husband (Peter Sullivan) is less enthusiastic and suggests not only abortion but also their separation. By mutual agreement, Jan leaves Hope Park. Following a staff social night, Ian and Debs kiss; the next day they agree that it would not damage their working relationship.
6	27 July 1999	Lucy Gannon	6
With Hope Park School still in special measures, the staff prepare for an inspection. Ian's plan to refurbish the school's unused library perturbs governor Dennis, since the current library was dedicated to his deceased son. When realising this, Ian arranges for the new study centre to retain the dedication. Meanwhile, Ian bumps into his ex-fiancé, Di (Cathy Tyson), who is now unemployed following poor career decisions that had been influenced by Ian. The inspectors conclude that the school is making good progress.

=== Series 2 ===
The four episodes of the second season were transmitted before the summer holidays (27 June – 18 July 2000), with the third series and final six episodes transmitted in the autumn of the same year (4 October – 5 November).

Episode number	Original airdate	Writer	#
1	27 June 2000	Lucy Gannon	7
New English teacher Kitty Burton (Gillian Kearney) is proving popular with staff and pupils, to the extent that a pupil, Liana Andrews (Senya Roberts), from her previous school applies to transfer to Hope Park. Ian and Debs revise the school's timetable to accommodate Liana's mobility issues. However, LEA officer Leo Wheeldon (Richard Griffiths) challenges Ian's decision to accept Liana, who is black, when he previously rejected applicants who happened to be white. Ian resents the accusations of racism.
2	4 July 2000	Ann Marie Di Mambro	8
Staff become concerned about the welfare of pupils Gary (Russell Tovey) and Stephen Bailey (Ben Brazier); it is discovered that their stepfather has left home, leaving Gary to look after his younger brother and sister. Phil Jakes continues his search for another teaching job, and receives a series of rejection letters. Following a stressful day, Ian and Debs kiss.
3	11 July 2000	Lisa Hunt	9
Pupil Martin McConnell (Peter Morton) is causing problems with his poor attitude, which is agitated by his more academic sister, Chloe (Jade Williams). Phil engages Martin, encouraging him to do mechanical work on the teacher's old Mini. The pupil is enthused, but later illegally drives the car on public roads. At home, Phil's wife, Jude (Julia Deakin), raises concerns about their marriage.
4	18 July 2000	Lucy Gannon	10
It's exam season, and Leo is not impressed that Phil has taken his eye off the ball following his marriage breakup. Ian suggests to Debs that they take the next step in their relationship, by moving in together. Debs suggests a "mock appraisal" process, which causes friction amongst the staff. Later, Phil discovers that he has mislaid a packet of examination papers due to be posted for marking. Phil, who has been left in charge whilst Ian is away, confides in Debs, who pressures him to reveal the truth to Ian. Phil then discovers a student has taken them as a result of clashing with Phil earlier in the day, and there is almost a violent confrontation, until Mike and Kitty intervene. Kitty, who has felt undermined and picked on by Phil since her arrival, reports his negligence to Ian. Phil is forced to resign, and accidentally reveals that Debs knew about the missing exam papers. Ian is angry that Debs had not informed him earlier about the incident, and she resigns as Deputy to spare Ian any embarrassment. However, Ian decides that he cannot trust Debs, and ends their relationship. Debs, who is disgusted at Ian for ending their relationship at the first sign of trouble, gives him some home truths, before resigning completely from Hope Park.

=== Series 3 ===
Episode number	Original airdate	Writer	#
1	4 October 2000	Lucy Gannon	11
New deputy heads Matt Bennett (Gresby Nash) and Annie Gilbert (Phyllis Logan) clash over funding for their relevant departments. After work, Ian and Matt have a heated argument in a pub, resulting in their arrests. Matt has identified that his pupils have been having substandard private music tuition from Mrs Watson (Menna Trussler); only after he distributes letters to parents advising against this tuition, he learns that the tutor is on the committee which is due to decide whether to grant his department additional funding.
2	5 October 2000	Lucy Gannon	12
Pupil Gemma Wilson (Lesley-Ann Garland), who is the daughter of Annie's partner, exhibits behavioural problems both at home and at school. When Gemma causes problems at school with fellow pupil Paul Jenson (Jamie Luke), his mother Clare (Suzette Llewellyn) visits the school and herself begins a relationship with Ian George. Meanwhile, Leo Wheeldon's introduction of an electronic registration system does not go according to plan.
3	11 October 2000		13
Ian offers Kitty the Head of Sixth Form role, without consulting Annie or Matt. They both agree that Ian should not have appointed someone so informally, without advertising the job. So, he backtracks and advertises the job internally, much to Kitty’s dismay, so Sally also applies. Who will come out on top? Meanwhile, a new Sixth Former arrives, and there’s an immediate spark between him and Kitty. But will she give into temptation and compromise her position? And how will Ian react?
4	18 October 2000		14
Sally and Tony’s relationship reaches the next level, when Tony moves in. However, the fractured relationship between Sean, a troublesome Year 11 pupil whose behaviour regularly lands hims in the Social Unit (dubbed “the Sin Bin”), and Amanda, a promising A-Level student, publicly derails Sally’s Sixth Form Conference, when Sean bitterly announces Amanda’s pregnancy, in front of a horrified Ian and Leo. When Tony offers Sean, who is planning on leaving school to join marines at the first opportunity, some support, Sean lashes out and attacks Tony. Tony tells Sally and the rest of the staff that he was mugged, but when Amanda, who witnessed the attack, tells Sally the truth, she is horrified, especially as Tony refuses to report it to Ian. When the truth does come out, Ian is disgusted that Tony allowed Sean to go unpunished, when he was a threat to staff and students. Ian suspends Sean, and Tony and Sally’s relationship is left in tatters.
5	2 November 2000		15
Exams, a missing hamster and a OFSTED inspection brings chaos to Hope Park. Matt is especially shocked, as his former Head of Department and old flame Shelia Haynes (Sally Dexter) is the lead inspector. Annie warns Matt about his connection with Shelia, and tells him that Ian does not need any extra stress. Matt, feeling guilty, relays this to Shelia. When Ian finds out, he accuses Matt of trying to undermine him. Sally discovers she is pregnant, and spends most of the morning throwing up, so Kitty offers to cover her class. During the lesson, an inspector walks in, and assumes Kitty is Sally, which leads to the two teachers swapping identities in order to cover for each other. Tony offers Sally his support in bringing up their baby, and they decide to give their relationship another go. The pressure gets too much for Ian who snaps at Keeley Porter, in front of Annie, a group of Year 11s and Clare, who Ian had proposed to the day before.
6	5 November 2000		16
Preparations are in full swing for Ian and Clare’s wedding. But, when Gerry Byrne (Daniel Hill (actor), a failing teacher with a hidden drinking problem, returns from being off sick, he clashes with Ian, Annie and Matt, while Leo is keen for Ian to sack him. Leo also drops the bombshell that he is retiring from his role as LEA Chief Education Officer, to Ian’s disappointment. Gerry faces further scrutiny when it is revealed that he has failed to send a child’s dyslexia report to the LEA, incurring the wrath of the parents, Leo and Ian. The staff are also fed up with Gerry’s constant incompetence, but Gerry decides to speak to Ian and make a formal grievance against Annie and Matt, which Ian dismisses completely. During Sports Day, Gerry has a breakdown, lashes out at a pupil, and ends up holding Kitty and a class of students hostage until George talks him round. But then, they both find themselves having a rooftop showdown…

== Reception ==
The series attracted mixed reviews. Writing in New Statesman David Jays says that Lucy Gannon's characters are sharpened by indignation, and "sorrow rounds them in the Dickensian manner". He also praises the show's use of classical music, rather than "second guessing youthful tunes and getting it cringingly wrong". The Observer's Caroline Boucher praised Gannon's "speedy character establishment" and Henry's "convincing" portrayal. Adam Sweeting in The Guardian was more critical, suggesting it is "old-fashioned melodrama", unfavorably contrasting Gannon with celebrated writers such as Jimmy McGovern and Alan Bleasdale. The use of classical music was "disorienting", and Sweeting suggests that "maybe education is too pressing and prickly an issue to be liquidised into soap opera, with its inevitable clichés and illogicalities." Writing in the Financial Times, Christopher Dunkley says the drama has "moments of interest", although Joe Joseph in The Times was very critical of the first series.

== Home media ==
All three series were released on DVD (Region 2 and 4) on 15 May 2006. A compilation audio CD featuring some of the classical music used in the first series was released on 1 October 1999.
