= Cheeky (2003 film) =

- Directed by: David Thewlis
- Written by: David Thewlis
- Produced by: Trudie Styler; Travis Swords
- Starring: David Thewlis; Lesley Sharp; Ian Hart; Trudie Styler; Johnny Vegas; Mark Benton; Eddie Marsan
- Cinematography: Oliver Stapleton
- Edited by: John Wilson
- Music by: Dario Marianelli
- Release date: September 2003 (Toronto)
- Running time: 94 minutes 95 minutes
- Countries: United Kingdom; France
- Language: English

Cheeky is a 2003 comedy-drama film written and directed by David Thewlis and starring Thewlis, Lesley Sharp, Ian Hart, Trudie Styler, Johnny Vegas, Mark Benton and Eddie Marsan. Luc Besson served as a co-producer.

== Cast ==
- David Thewlis as Harry Sankey
- Trudie Styler as Nancy Grey
- Sean Ward as Sam Sankey
- Lesley Sharp as Aunty Kath
- Ian Hart as Uncle Alan
- Johnny Vegas as Al Price
- Ruth Sheen as Tamara
- Lisa Gorman as Nancy Sankey
- Mark Benton as Big Mick
- Eddie Marsan as Reg

== Release ==
The film premiered at the 2003 Toronto International Film Festival.

== Reception ==
David Rooney of Variety gave the film a negative review and wrote, “Sappy, sentimental and lacking bite even in its satire of something as lampoonable as television gameshows, this toothless comedy-drama about a bereaved father and son's difficult path toward reconciliation is utterly vanilla tube fodder.”

Allan Hunter of Screen International gave the film a mixed review and wrote, “An uneasy mixture of broad comedy and sticky sentiment, it is more likely to charm general audiences than please critics.”
