= Lesley Sharp =

British actress

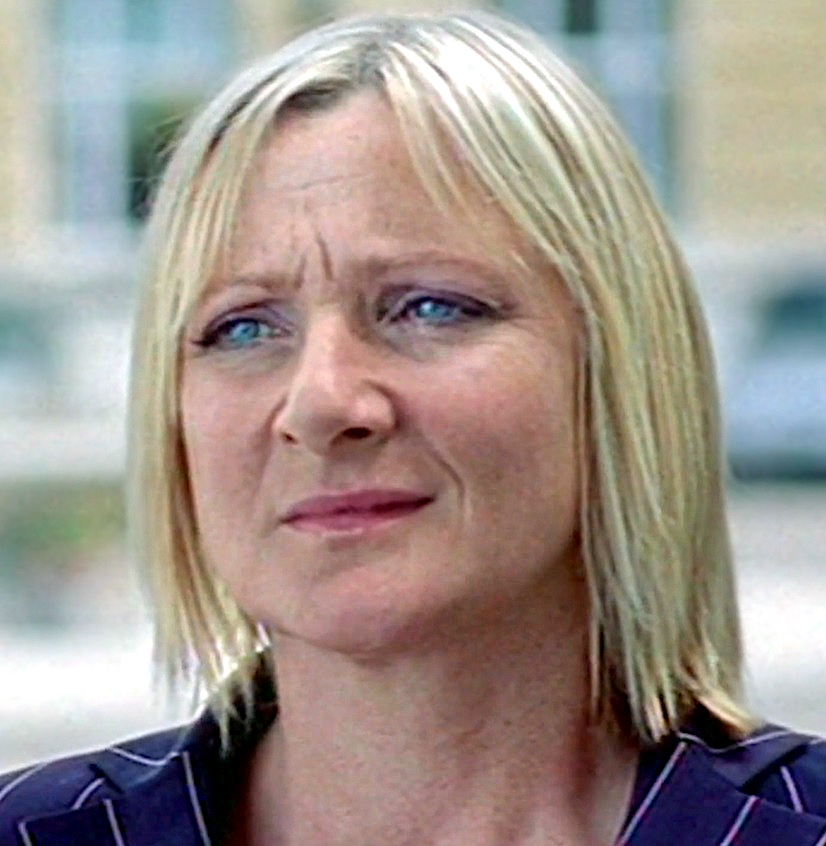
- Sharp in Carla (2003)
- Born: Karen Makinson; Manchester, England
- Occupation: Actress
- Years active: 1983–present
- Spouse: Nicholas Gleaves (m. 1994)
- Children: 2

Lesley Sharp is a British actress. She became widely known for her role as Detective Constable Janet Scott in the ITV crime series Scott & Bailey (2011–2016). Her other credits include Rita, Sue and Bob Too (1987), The Rachel Papers (1989), Naked (1993), Priest (1994), The Moonstone (1996), Great Expectations (1999), Daylight Robbery (1999), Clocking Off (2000–2001), From Hell (2001), Vera Drake (2004), Afterlife (2005–2006), Help (2021), This Cop Life (2022), The Full Monty (2023) and Pillion (2025).

She was nominated for the BAFTA Award for Best Actress in a Supporting Role for her part in the film The Full Monty (1997), and for the British Academy Television Award for Best Actress in 2002 for her role in Bob & Rose (2001).

== Early life and education ==
Sharp was born as Karen Makinson in Manchester, England, to Elsie Makinson and Norman Patient, a married tram driver. The two were carrying on an extramarital affair. She was adopted at six weeks old by Roberta and William Henry John Sharp, a tax inspector. Sharp grew up in Merseyside.

Sharp has stated that she started acting because, as a child, she felt "invisible" and did not "quite fit in". She has said that her inspiration to act came from watching Dick Emery on television.

Sharp attended the Guildhall School of Music and Drama in the class of 1982.

== Career ==
Sharp's screen debut was in Alan Clarke's Rita, Sue and Bob Too (1987), playing Bob's wife, Michelle. Further film appearances included supporting roles in The Rachel Papers (1989), and Stephen Poliakoff's Close My Eyes, with Clive Owen and Alan Rickman. Sharp starred in Mike Leigh's Naked (1993), and the Jimmy McGovern-penned Priest (1994). She made appearances in Prime Suspect 4: The Lost Child (1995), and The Full Monty (1997).

She had leading roles in Common As Muck (1997), followed by Playing the Field (1998–2002), a drama about a female football team which ran for five series. Sharp had supporting parts in Great Expectations (1999), as Mrs Joe, and in Nature Boy (2000), as Martha Tyler, before landing the role of Trudy Graham in Paul Abbott's BAFTA-award-winning Clocking Off (2000–2003), Russell T. Davies then cast her opposite Alan Davies in Bob & Rose, which resulted in a British Academy Television Award for Best Actress nomination in 2002.

Further film roles in From Hell, starring Johnny Depp, and Cheeky (1993), which was directed by Naked co-star David Thewlis, preceded another television drama written by Russell T. Davies. She starred in The Second Coming (2003).

Sharp again worked with Mike Leigh in Vera Drake (2004), which was followed by the television drama Planespotting, The same year, she played the clairvoyant lead role of Alison Mundy opposite Andrew Lincoln's sceptical Robert Bridge in ITV's supernatural drama series Afterlife.

After a ten-year break from stagework, in October 2005 Sharp returned to the theatre as Emma in Sam Shepard's The God of Hell at the Donmar Warehouse. In 2008, she starred in the three-part Lucy Gannon-penned drama The Children. Later in 2008, she worked with Russell T. Davies for a third time when she played Sky Silvestry in the Doctor Who episode "Midnight". Davies later tipped Sharp to become the first woman to play the Doctor.

In early 2009 Sharp played Petronella van Daan in the BBC's new version of The Diary of Anne Frank. She subsequently played Paddy Considine's wife in Channel 4's acclaimed drama series Red Riding. Sharp starred in a 2009 revival of The Rise and Fall of Little Voice at the Vaudeville Theatre with Marc Warren and Diana Vickers, which ran from October to the following January.

Between 2011 and 2016, Sharp co-starred with Suranne Jones, playing Janet Scott for the five series comprising ITV1's crime drama series Scott & Bailey. In May 2012 she starred in the Sky1 comedy series Starlings as Jan Starling.

In 2015, Sharp played the part of Mary, the daughter of Petunia Howe, in the three-part BBC series Capital based on John Lanchester's novel of the same name.

She appeared in several episodes of the 2021 Netflix original Fate: The Winx Saga as Rosalind but was replaced in this role with Miranda Richardson after the first season. In 2021 she took the lead role in Kae Tempest’s Philoctetes at the National Theatre.

In 2022 she narrated the police documentary This Cop Life.

In 2025, she appeared in the movie Pillion as Colin's mother Peggy. In the movie, Colin (Harry Melling) enters a relationship with Ray (Alexander Skarsgård). Peggy, who is dying of cancer, is distrustful of Ray and believes that Colin's relationship with Ray is not healthy.

== Personal life ==
Sharp married Nicholas Gleaves in 1994, and they have two children.

== Filmography ==
Film
Year	Title	Role	Notes
1987	Rita, Sue and Bob Too	Michelle	
1987	The Love Child	Bernadette	
1989	The Rachel Papers	Jenny	
1991	Close My Eyes	Jessica	
1993	Naked	Louise	
1994	Syrup	Miss James	Short
1994	Priest	Mrs. Unsworth	
1997	The Full Monty	Jean	
2001	From Hell	Kate Eddowes	
2002	Spyhole	Angela Miller	Short
2003	Cheeky	Kath	
2004	Vera Drake	Jessica Barnes	
2008	Inkheart	Mortola	
2009	In Passing	Fay Travers	Short
2012	Peekaboo	Emily	Short
2015	The Holocaust: A Story of Remembrance	Narrator	Short
2016	Dusty and Me	Lil	
2017	All That You Love Will Be Carried Away	Alice	Short
2018	Spoon Fed	Ellie	Short
2019	Brighton	Doreen	
2022	Catherine Called Birdy	Morwenna	
2025	Pillion	Peggy	

Television
Year	Title	Role	Notes
1983	Tartuffe, or the Impostor	Mariane	TV film
1987	ScreenPlay	Valerie	"Road"
1989	ScreenPlay	Marion Parkin	"Night Voice"
1989	ScreenPlay	Woman	"Wedded"
1991	Josie		1 episode
1991	Performance	Dull Gret / Angie	"Top Girls"
1992	She-Play		"First Night"
1993	Nights	Carol	
1993–94	Frank Stubbs Promotes	Petra Dillon	Main (13 episodes)
1994	The All New Alexei Sayle Show	Various	2 episodes
1994	Stages	Susan	"Speaking in Tongues"
1994	Dandelion Dead	Constance 'Connie' Martin, née Davies	Mini-series
1995	Prime Suspect	Anne Sutherland	"The Lost Child"
1995	The Peter Principle	Susan Harvey	"Pilot"
1996	The Moonstone	Rosanna Spearman	TV film
1997	Common As Muck	Christine Stranks	Main (6 episodes)
1997	Lloyds Bank Channel 4 Film Challenge	Pet Warmley	"Nurse Ajax"
1998–2000	Playing the Field	Theresa Mullen	Main (20 episodes)
1999	Great Expectations	Mrs. Joe	TV film
1999	Daylight Robbery	Carol Murphy	Main (4 episodes)
2000	Nature Boy	Martha	Mini-series
2000–01	Clocking Off	Trudy Graham	Main (11 episodes)
2001	Bob & Rose	Rose Cooper	Main (6 episodes)
2003	The Second Coming	Judith Roach	Mini-series
2003	Carla	Helen North	TV film
2004	Carrie's War	Louisa Evans	TV film
2005	Planespotting	Lesley Coppin	TV film
2005	Born with Two Mothers	Laura Mayfield	TV film
2005	Days of Darkness	Jerri Nielsen	TV film
2005–06	Afterlife	Alison Mundy	Main (14 episodes)
2005	Our Hidden Lives	Edie Rutherford	TV film
2006	The True Voice of Murder		TV film
2006	The True Voice of Prostitution		TV film
2008	Doctor Who	Sky Silvestry	"Midnight"
2008	The Children	Anne	Mini-series (3 episodes)
2009	The Diary of Anne Frank	Petronella van Daan	Mini-series (5 episodes)
2009	Red Riding	Joan Hunter	"1980"
2009	Moving On	Sylvie	"Butterfly Effect"
2009	Cranford	Mrs. Bell	Specials
2009	Poirot	Miss Martindale	"The Clocks"
2010	Whistle and I'll Come to You	Hetty	TV film
2011	Leah's Story	Narrator	Documentary
2011	The Shadow Line	Julie Bede	Mini-series (6 episodes)
2011–16	Scott & Bailey	DC Janet Scott	Main (33 episodes)
2011	The Walton Sextuplets: Moving On	Narrator	TV film
2011	Shirley	Eliza Bassey	TV film
2012	Protecting Our Children	Narrator	Mini-series (3 episodes)
2012–13	Starlings	Jan	Main (16 episodes)
2012	Corfu: a Tale of Two Islands	Narrator	Documentary
2013	Homeboys	Eileen	TV film
2013	Who Do You Think You Are?	Herself	1 episode (S10E4)
2014	Shirley	Charlotte Brontë	
2015	Capital	Mary	Mini-series (3 episodes)
2015	Tom Daley: Diving for Gold	Narrator	Documentary
2016	Paranoid	Lucy Cannonbury	Main (8 episodes)
2017	Three Girls	DC Margaret Oliver	Mini-series (3 episodes)
2017–19	Living the Dream	Jen Pemberton	Main (12 episodes)
2021	Fate: The Winx Saga	Rosalind	3 episodes
2021–	Before We Die	Hannah Laing	Main
2021	Help	Gaynor	TV film
2021	Heaven Made	Narrator	Documentary
2023	The Full Monty	Jean	Mini-series
2024 -	Red Eye	DG Madeline Delaney	Drama
2026	Bergerac	Monica	Upcoming

=== Theatre ===
In October 2005, Sharp starred in her first theatre role for a decade in the play The God of Hell at the Donmar Warehouse, London.

In 2008, she played the lead character in the play Harper Regan at Royal National Theatre.

In 2014, she played the character Helen in the play A Taste of Honey at Royal National Theatre.

== Awards and nominations ==
Year	Award	Category	Work	Result	Ref.
1988	Olivier Awards	Best Comedy Performance	A Family Affair	Nominated	
1992	Olivier Awards	Best Supporting Actress	Uncle Vanya	Nominated	
1998	BAFTA Film Awards	Best Supporting Actress	The Full Monty	Nominated	
1998	Screen Actors Guild Awards	Outstanding Cast in a Film	The Full Monty	Won	
2002	BAFTA TV Awards	Best Actress	Bob and Rose	Nominated	
2002	Royal Television Society	Best Female Actor	Bob and Rose	Nominated	
2006	Royal Television Society	Best Female Actor	Afterlife	Won	
