= Carla (film) =

2003 TV film directed by Diarmuid Lawrence

- Genre: Crime drama
- Created by: Joanna Hines
- Written by: Barbara Machin
- Directed by: Diarmuid Lawrence
- Starring: Lesley Sharp; Helen McCrory; Iain Glen; Shaun Dingwall; Michael Fassbender; Henry Ian Cusick
- Composer: John Lunn
- Country of origin: United Kingdom
- Original language: English
- No. of episodes: 1

Production
- Executive producers: Debbie Shewell; Murray Smith
- Producer: Alison Jackson
- Cinematography: Simon Richards
- Editor: Justin Krish
- Running time: 90 minutes
- Production companies: West End Films; RDF Media

Original release
- Network: ITV
- Release: 15 September 2003

Carla is a British television crime drama film, based upon the novel Improvising Carla by Joanna Hines, first broadcast on ITV on 15 September 2003. The film, adapted for television by writer Barbara Machin and director Diarmuid Lawrence, stars Lesley Sharp and Helen McCrory as Helen North and Carla French, two women who become friends after meeting on holiday on the Greek Islands. But when Carla is later found dead on an isolated Island road, with only Helen by her side, the subsequent investigation reveals that from the start, their alliance was based on fantasy and lies.

Filming took place on the island of Kythira, Greece. The Guardian were critical of the adaptation, writing; "The précis doesn't quite transmit the subtler nuances of the plot, which was a cracking one, deftly realised by a trio of fine actors and some sterling support. But of course, spelling it all out doesn't work, not even in the justifiable context of TV criticism". The film drew 7.25 million viewers on its debut broadcast. The film was uploaded in its entirety to YouTube on 8 July 2011, having never received an official home video release.

== Cast ==
- Lesley Sharp as Helen North
- Helen McCrory as Carla French
- Iain Glen as Daniel French
- Shaun Dingwall as Paul
- Michael Fassbender as Rob
- Henry Ian Cusick as Matt
- Eve Polycarpou as Sevasti
- Dimitri Andreas as Manoli
- Su Elliot as Mrs. Bryant
- Albert Welling as Mr. Bryant
- Philip Fox as Mr. Carter
- Melanie Kilburn as Mrs. Carter
- Vaggelis Kloufetos as Detective Sireus
- Michael Bertenshaw as Coroner
- Lucy Robinson as Pathologist
