= Julia Ford =

British actress, voice actress, and director

Julia Ford is a British actress, voice actress, and director.

== Career ==
=== Acting ===
Ford's acting work includes theatre, film, radio, and television productions.

She played the lead role of Agnes in Molière's School For Wives at the National Theatre, aged 23. In 2015 and 2016 she played Lydia Lambert in Husbands and Sons at the National Theatre.

=== Directing ===
In 2017 Ford directed In His Kiss for BBC Radio 4.

In 2018 she directed Harlan Coben's Safe for Netflix, and in 2019 she directed a new three-part series for ITV, Sticks and Stones. In 2022 Ford directed the last three episodes of the BBC series Everything I Know About Love.

Ford directed the 2024 true crime drama TV miniseries Until I Kill You, written by Nick Stevens and produced by Ken Horn for World Productions.

== Filmography ==
=== Film ===
Year	Title	Role	Notes
1987	The Continental	Carol	TV film
1994	The Healer	Dr. Martha Fairbrass	TV film
1997	Eight Hours from Paris	Janet	TV film
1998	Soft Sand, Blue Sea	Sarah	
1999	A Room for Romeo Brass	Sandra Woolley	
2000	Anchor Me	Jackie Carter	TV film
2002	Shadow Man		Short film
2002	Birthday Girl	Karen	TV film
2002	The Life Class	Vanessa	
2003	Wondrous Oblivion	Mrs. Bryce	
2003	Butterfly World	Liz	Short film
2004	Moth	Angela	Short film
2007	The Good Samaritan	Hannah Farrell	TV film
2007	Coming Down the Mountain	Shelia Philips	TV film
2007	To Build a Home		Short film
2008	Hughie Green, Most Sincerly	June Laverick	TV film
2008	Summer	Anne	
2009	Red Riding: The Year of Our Lord 1980	Elizabeth Hall	TV film
2009	The Park	Tony's Mum	Short film
2010	I'll Tell You	Maureen	Short film
2011	Macbeth	Lady Macbeth	Unknown film
2012	Vinyl	Jules	
2012	Now Is Good	Sally	
2014	Radiator	Jean	
2015	Don't Take My Baby	Laura	TV film
2017	Babs	Julie Deeks	TV film

=== Television ===
Year	Title	Role	Notes
1985	The Practice	Janis Jones	Recurring role, 11 episodes
1987	The Ritz	Carol	Series regular, 6 episodes
1990	Bergerac	Suzy Burchet	Episode: "All the Sad Songs"
1992	A Fatal Inversion	Vivien	Mini-series, 2 episodes
1993	The Bill	Jean Ashmore	Episode: "Tangled Webs"
1993	ScreenPlay	Fiona Clarke	Episode: "The Merrihill Millionaires
1993	Casualty	Susie	Episode: "Good Friends"
1994	In Suspicious Circumstances	Alice Hewitt	Episode: "Absence of Mercy"
1994	A Skirt Through History	Anne Lister	Episode: "A Marriage"
1994	The Bill	Sheena Jackman	Episode: "War of Nerves"
1995	Ghosts	Joanne	Episode: "The Chemistry Lesson"
1995	Medics	Liz Seymour	Recurring role, 3 episodes
1995	Peak Practice	Liz Thurston	Episode: "Family Ties"
1996	Accused	Carol Tyler	Episode: "Carol"
1996	The Bill	W.P.C. Sampson	Episode: "Happy Birthday"
1997	Insiders	Annie Whitby	Series regular, 6 episodes
1998	Where the Heart Is	Sue Bradley	Episode: "Ice Pops"
1999	City Central	DSI Gagan	Recurring role, 2 episodes
2000	Heartbeat	Sandra Wilson	Episode: "The Fool on the Hill"
2000	Peak Practice	Sandra Jordan	Episode: "Playing God"
2001	In a Land of Plenty	Sonia	Recurring role, 5 episodes
2002	Fergus's Wedding	Penny Kent	Series regular, 6 episodes
2002	Always and Everyone	Claire Hampel	Episode: "Warrior's Heart"
2002	Dinotopia	Iridia	Episode: "The Matriarch"
2004	Island at War	Kathleen Jones	Series regular, 6 episodes
2004	Silent Witness	Louise Dryden	Episode: "Nowhere Fast"
2004	Best Friends	Liz	Series regular, 5 episodes
2005	Midsomer Murders	Joanna Craxton	Episode: "Bantling Boy"
2005	All About George	Annie Kinsey	Series regular, 6 episodes
2006	Director's Debut	Debbie	Episode: "The Lightning Kid"
2007	The Street	Roz Morgan	Recurring role, 5 episodes
2008	Waking the Dead	Lucy Dearden	Episode: "Wounds"
2008	Holby City	Louise Turner	Episode: "This Be the Verse"
2009	Jonathan Creek	Delia Gunning	Episode: "The Grinning Man"
2009	Being Human	Fleur	Episode: "Another Fine Mess"
2009	Doctors	Sally Hamilton	Episode: "Lucky"
2009	Shameless	Maureen	Recurring role, 5 episodes
2009	Moving On	Jean	Episode: "Bully"
2009	Inspector George Gently	Mrs. Fuller	Episode: "Gently Through the Mill"
2009	The Bill	Debbie Readshaw	Episode: "Live by the Sword"
2010	Law & Order: UK	Judy Johnson	Episode: "Hounded"
2011	New Tricks	Jean	Episode: "Setting Out Your Stall"
2012	Room at the Top	Mrs. Thompson	Mini-series, 2 episodes
2012	The Secret of Crickley Hall	Irene Judd	Mini-series, 2 episodes
2013	Frankie	Mary McCloud	Series regular, 6 episodes
2013	Misfits	Pat	Series 5, episode 2
2013	The Paradise	Ruby	Episode: "Series 2, Episode 4"
2014	Happy Valley	Jenny Weatherill	Recurring role, 5 episodes
2016	Vera	Morven	Episode: "Tuesday's Child"
2017	Love, Lies and Records	Frances	Recurring role, 2 episodes
