= Dad (2005 film) =

- Written by: Lucy Gannon
- Directed by: Sarah Harding
- Starring: Richard Briers; Kevin Whately; Jean Heywood; Sinéad Cusack; Hannah Daniels
- Music by: Nicholas Hooper
- Country of origin: United Kingdom
- Original language: English

Production
- Executive producer: Julie Gardner
- Producer: Hilary Bevan Jones
- Running time: 83 minutes
- Production company: BBC Wales

Original release
- Network: BBC Wales
- Release: 24 February 2005

Dad is a 2005 British television film made by BBC Wales. It stars Richard Briers, Kevin Whately, Jean Heywood, Sinéad Cusack and Hannah Daniels. It is written by Lucy Gannon, produced by Hilary Bevan Jones and directed by Sarah Harding.

== Synopsis ==
The film explores elder abuse issues. Larry James (Richard Briers) is an 80-year-old elderly man who lives happily with his wife Jeannie (Jean Heywood). One day, Larry has an accident by falling down the stairs and injuring his leg. Soon after he has been released from hospital, Jeannie begins to suffer from Alzheimer's disease and completely forgets who Larry is. Once she has been taken to care, Larry goes to live with his family; his son Oliver (Kevin Whately), his daughter-in-law Sandy (Sinéad Cusack) and his granddaughter Millie (Hannah Daniels). But whilst Larry and Oliver are spending time together, things start to take a turn for the worse in their father and son relationship.

== Soundtrack ==
The score was composed by Nicholas Hooper.
