= Sue Gibson (cinematographer) =

British cinematographer

- Born: 8 November 1952; Derbyshire, England
- Died: 27 July 2016 (aged 63)
- Education: National Film and Television School
- Occupation: Cinematographer

Sue Gibson (8 November 1952 – 27 July 2016) was a British cinematographer known for the film Mrs. Dalloway (1997). She was the first female member of the British Society of Cinematographers, and later became the first female president of the society in 2008.

== Early life and biography ==
Sue Gibson was born in Derbyshire, England. She left Derbyshire at the age of 18, in 1970 after school and followed her passion, taking up photography at the Newport College of Art.

Gibson's experience with photography started after she was given her first camera at the age of fourteen. Her studies at Newport College of Art influenced her interest in film, thus leading her to attend the National Film and Television School, graduating in 1981.

== Career ==
After graduating in 1981 from the National Film and Television School, Gibson started her career in the film industry as a clapper loader. She worked as a clapper loader for only two years until she started her position as Director of Photography for commercials, television shows, and films.

Gibson progressed from working on television commercials to television productions after 10 years: her first being Hear My Song (1991), which then started her work with major films and television series. As Gibson was one of the rare females working in photography and behind the camera in her day, she built her experience based on the help and teachings of those on set around her. When her first production came around, her feelings on working on Hear My Song (1991) were stated as: “It was fantastic and a great film to work on. Being your first feature you put your heart and soul into it” Sue Gibson, quoted from In Conversation with Cinematographers, by David A. Ellis.

Gibson went on to work on various television productions and series, and major film productions, including Mrs. Dalloway (1997), Resident Evil (2002), Alien vs. Predator (film) (2004), and more. She also worked on the British television series Agatha Raisin: The Quiche of Death (2014). The last thing she worked on before her death was 4 episodes of 'Death In Paradise' and was posthumously awarded The Philips Vari-Lite Award for Drama at The Knight of Illumination Awards 2016 for 2 of the episodes.

== Legacy ==
Sue Gibson has the legacy of holding the first female member of the British Society of Cinematographers, invited to the group in 1992. Her awards and work landed her an offer to be elected as a member on the board of governors for the society in 2004, and later to become the first female president of the British Society of Cinematographers between the years of 2008–2010.

Her legacy as the first female member of the British Society of Cinematographers allowed co-worker, director Marleen Gorris, to speak highly of Gibson in an interview on the film Mrs. Dalloway, claiming she was: "the most important and only woman".

== Filmography ==
Taken from Sue Gibson on the Internet Movie Database:

Year	Title	Credit Listing
1983	The Ploughman’s Lunch	Clapper Loader
1983	Birth of a Nation, T.V. movie	Assistant Camera
1983	John Love, short	
1991	A Room of One’s Own, T.V. movie	
1991	The New Look	
1991	Secret Friends	
1991	Hear My Song	
1997	Mrs Dalloway	Director of Photography
1997	Bright Hair, T.V. movie	
1998	Amongst Women, T.V. mini series	
1998	Lights, short	
1999	Pure Wickedness, T.V. series	
1999	Tube Tales	
2000	Saving Grace	Director of Photography; 2nd Unit
2001	Moving on Up	
2001	Fourplay	
2001	The Search for John Gissing	
2002	Resident Evil	Director of photography; 2nd Unit
2002	Mrs Caldicot’s Cabbage War	Director of photography
2002	The Forsyte Saga, mini T.V. series	Director of photography
2002-2003	Spooks, T.V. series	Director of photography
2004	AVP: Alien vs. Preditor	Director of photography
2005	Lights 2, short	
2005	55 Degrees North, T.V. series	Director of photography
2005	Jericho, T.V. series	Director of photography
2005	Riot at the Right, T.V. movie	
2006	Agatha Christie: Poirot, T.V. series (episode 1)	Director of photography
2006	A Sense of Carol Reed, video documentary short	Camera operator
2006	The Holiday	Director of photography; 2nd Unit
2005/2007	Agatha Christie’s Marple, T.V. series, 2 episodes	Director of photography
2007	Confessions of a Diary Secretary, T.V. movie	Director of photography
2007	Women Behind the Camera	Self
2008	Shooting Women	Self
2009	Diamonds, T.V. movie	Lighting cameraman
2009	31 North 62 East	
2010	Looking for the Lone Star	Assistant camera
2011	The Mapmaker, short	
2012	Inspector Lewis, T.V. series, 1 episode	Director of photography
2014	Agatha Raisin: The Quiche of Death, T.V. movie	Director of photography

== Awards and nominations ==
- In 1988, Sue Gibson won the award Lion D'Or at the Cannes Film Festival for a "K shoes" commercial
- In 1993, Sue Gibson won the Evening Standard Award for Best Technical/Artistic Achievement on Hear My Song (1991) and Secret Friends(1991).
- In 1995, she was awarded for her contribution to the medium
- In 1999, The Irish Film and Television Award for best craft contributing in television for Amongst Women (1998).
- In 2010, Gibson was given an award for her cinematography by the International Women's Foundation.
