= Jean Heywood =

English actress (1921–2019)

- Publicity photograph of Heywood
- Born: Jean Murray; 15 July 1921; Blyth, Northumberland, England
- Died: 14 September 2019 (aged 98); East Sussex, England
- Occupation: Actress
- Years active: 1968–2010
- Spouse: Roland Heywood (m. 1945; died 1996)
- Children: 3

Jean Heywood (born Jean Murray; 15 July 1921 – 14 September 2019) was an English actress.

== Career ==
Heywood appeared in many roles, mainly in television but also in films such as Billy Elliot. Her television work included roles in When the Boat Comes In, Our Day Out, All Creatures Great and Small, Boys from the Blackstuff, Family Affairs, The Bill and Casualty. Heywood had a main role in the sitcom Leave it to Charlie. In 2005, she starred alongside Richard Briers and Kevin Whately in a drama called Dad on BBC One as part of Comic Relief's Elder Abuse campaign. In 2010 Heywood made a guest appearance in the ITV series Married Single Other.

== Personal life and death ==
Heywood was born in Blyth, Northumberland on 15 July 1921. At age six, she moved with her parents, Jack and Elsie, to New Zealand. Her mother died less than six months later, and the family returned to the UK.

Heywood died on 14 September 2019, at the age of 98. Her husband, Roland, had died in 1996. They had two children together, and Heywood had another from an earlier relationship.

== Filmography ==
- When the Boat Comes In (1976–77) as Bella Seaton
- Our Day Out (1977) as Mrs Kay
- Emmerdale Farm (1978) as Phyllis Acaster
- Leave it to Charlie (1978-1980) as Florence McGee
- Boys from the Blackstuff (1982) E5 "George’s Last Ride" as Mary Malone
- No Place Like Home (1984) as Lillian (Beryl's mother)
- Dalgliesh (TV series) Cover Her Face (1985) as Martha
- A Very Peculiar Practice (1986) as Lillian Hubbard
- Miss Marple: Sleeping Murder (1987) as Edie Pagett
- All Creatures Great and Small (1990) as Mrs Alton
- Spender (1992) S2:E6 "At the End of the Day" as Sarah Ellis
- The Glass Virgin (1995) as Amy
- Heartbeat (1995) S5:E6 "We're All Allies Really" as Hilda Openshaw
- Kavanagh QC (1995) S1:E1 "Nothing but the truth" as Marjorie Kavanagh
- Kavanagh QC (1996) S2:E6 "Job Satisfaction" as Marjorie Kavanagh
- A Touch of Frost (1997) S5:E4 "No Other Love" as Olive Walters
- Hetty Wainthropp Investigates (1998) S4:E3 "Digging for Dirt" as Enid Weston
- Billy Elliot (2000) as Grandma
- Brookside (2000) as Kitty Hilton
- Dad (2005) as Jeannie James

== Radio ==
The Secret Life of Rosewood Avenue (1991) – Miss. Tapp
