= Ben Owen-Jones =

British actor

Ben Owen-Jones is a British actor.

His first television appearance was as a child when he appeared in the BBC children's programme Grange Hill.

In 1995, he had an accident which resulted in a spinal injury, leaving him paraplegic, and since then he uses a wheelchair for mobility. Following rehabilitation he studied interactive art at undergraduate level and went on to take an M.A. in multimedia. His work was shown at an art festival in Germany.

In 2005, he applied for and was selected to take part in the Talent Fund for Disabled Actors – a bursary scheme organised by the BBC, Channel 4 and the Actors Centre. The scheme was designed to increase the pool of disabled acting talent available to TV casting directors and provided BBC masterclasses delivered by leading TV directors, and Actors Centre training. Following this he was cast in the new BBC drama, New Street Law where he played Chris Quick; a semi-regular character who was also paraplegic. Since then he has gone on to appear in several TV dramas.
In 2012 he played the part of a wounded soldier in the dramatisation of the story of Dr. Ludwig Guttmann written by Lucy Gannon.

Since becoming disabled he has worked with charities in England and Wales to offer support to other people who have sustained spinal injuries.
