= Protecting Our Children =

- Genre: Documentary
- Narrated by: Lesley Sharp
- Country of origin: United Kingdom
- Original language: English
- No. of series: 1
- No. of episodes: 3 (list of episodes)

Original release
- Network: BBC Two
- Release: 30 January – 13 February 2012

Protecting Our Children is a British documentary television series about social workers in the child protection department in Bristol. Lesley Sharp narrates the series, which was shown on BBC Two from 30 January – 13 February 2012.

== Episode list ==
No.	Title	Original release date
1	"Damned If They Do, Damned If They Don't"	30 January 2012
A couple who are neglecting their three-year-old son are investigated. The couple do not provide a reasonable life for him and the father is hostile and passive-aggressive towards the team. The father hits the mother, soon after which the couple separate. The son and the couple's newborn baby are taken into care permanently, the course of action that the mother decided upon. She is allowed to send a letters to her children twice a year, but not permitted to see them. The father did not make any further contact with the services.
2	"Expecting Trouble"	6 February 2012
A couple who have had their children removed by the authorities at birth are expecting another baby. The father is violent. Both parents drink alcohol to excess, self-harm and have been homeless. Other children the father has had have also been taken into care. The baby, a daughter, is born and is later taken into care.
3	"I Want My Baby Back"	13 February 2012
