= The Secret Life of Rosewood Avenue =

British radio comedy series

The Secret Life of Rosewood Avenue is a British radio comedy series, first broadcast on BBC Radio 4 in 1991. Written by Stephen Sheridan, it starred James Grout, Margaret Courtenay, Jean Heywood and Christopher Good. The show was produced by Lissa Evans.

The series has been repeated on BBC Radio 7 and BBC Radio 4 Extra.

== Cast ==
- James Grout as Reverend Timothy Carswell
- Margaret Courtenay as Miss Tilling
- Jean Heywood as Miss Tapp
- Christopher Good as Dr Warlock
- Patricia Hayes as Miss. Willow
- Rosemary Martin as Mrs. Garland

== Plot ==
The show concerns the Reverend Timothy Carswell, a timid and somewhat naive vicar who is assigned to an apparently respectable suburban parish. However, the area is actually a hotbed of (among other things) gossip, passion, geriatric prostitution and murder, all of which is going on under Reverend Carswell's unsuspecting nose.

== Episodes ==
No. overall	No. in series	Title	Original release date
1	1	"Moving In"	26 February 1991
2	2	"Entertaining Edwin"	5 March 1991
3	3	"Raising the Dead"	12 March 1991
4	4	"Miss Willow and the One-Eyed Gentleman"	19 March 1991
5	5	"Mrs Garland's Good Deeds"	26 March 1991
6	6	"The Resurrection of Reverend Carswell"	2 April 1991
