= Pure Wickedness =

British television drama mini-series

- Genre: Drama
- Created by: Lucy Gannon
- Written by: Lucy Gannon
- Directed by: Harry Hook
- Starring: Orla Brady; Kevin Whately; David Morrissey; Bhasker Patel; Linda Spurrier; Lesley Dunlop; Pip Torrens; Danielle McCormack; Rachel Ambler; Sarah Rice; Lizzie Hopley
- Composer: John E. Keane
- Country of origin: United Kingdom
- Original language: English
- No. of series: 1
- No. of episodes: 4

Production
- Executive producer: Jane Tranter
- Producer: Joy Spink
- Production locations: Derbyshire, England, UK
- Cinematography: Sue Gibson
- Editor: Liz Webber
- Running time: 50 minutes
- Production company: BBC Productions

Original release
- Network: BBC One
- Release: 14 September – 5 October 1999

Pure Wickedness is a four-part British television drama miniseries, created and written by Lucy Gannon and directed by Harry Hook, that first broadcast on BBC One between 14 September and 5 October 1999.

The series was broadcast on Tuesdays at 21:30, and was also repeated on Saturdays and Tuesdays on BBC Choice.

== Premise ==
Set in the heart of rural Derbyshire, the series deals with the aftermath of adultery. It is centred Jenny (Orla Brady) and Geoff Meadows' (Kevin Whately) marriage, which is disrupted when Jenny begins an affair with window-cleaner Frank Healy (David Morrissey).

== Cast ==
- Orla Brady as Jenny Meadows
- Kevin Whately as Geoff Meadows
- David Morrissey as Frank Healy
- Bhasker Patel as Dr. Raju Patel
- Linda Spurrier as Dr. Anna Faulkner
- Lesley Dunlop as Mo Healy
- Pip Torrens as Dr. Phil Gold
- Danielle McCormack as Ellen Meadows
- Rachel Ambler as Elieen
- Sarah Rice as Sue
- Lizzie Hopley as DI.

== Episodes ==
List of episodes
No. in series	Title	Directed by	Written by	Original release date
1	"Episode 1"	Harry Hook	Lucy Gannon	14 September 1999
After 14 years of a happy marriage, Jenny meets the handsome Frank and is immediately attracted to him. Frank, a window cleaner, is married with four children.
2	"Episode 2"	Harry Hook	Lucy Gannon	21 September 1999
Jenny throws herself headlong into the affair.
3	"Episode 3"	Harry Hook	Lucy Gannon	28 September 1999
Jenny faces an emotional tug of war.
4	"Episode 4"	Harry Hook	Lucy Gannon	5 October 1999
Eighteen months after her affair, Jenny decides to leave her family.

== Production ==
Principal photography took place in Derbyshire, Kent and London in 1998. On-location filming locations included Matlock, Thorpe Cloud, Chesterfield and Belper, while indoor scenes were filmed in London. This coincided with showrunner Lucy Gannon's move back to Derbyshire, where she chose to set the series.

== Reception ==
Peter Salmon of The Guardian gave the series a mixed review, writing; "It's not about poaching stars; it's not about imitating innovative formats. It [the BBC 1 schedule] is about ambition, quality, commitment and talent." Fiona Looney of the Sunday Tribune wrote suggested the relationship between Jenny and Frank lacked "an undercurrent of passion". Sean Day-Lewis of Country Life gave a more positive review, praising Gannon's "unfailingly true" characters and dialogue.

== Home media ==
The series has yet to be released on DVD or VHS.
