= Scott & Bailey =

British police procedural crime drama TV series (2011–2016)

- Genre: Crime drama Police procedural
- Created by: Diane Taylor; Sally Wainwright
- Developed by: Suranne Jones; Sally Lindsay
- Written by: Sally Wainwright; Amelia Bullmore; Lee Warburton; Emily Ballou
- Directed by: Various
- Starring: Suranne Jones; Lesley Sharp; Amelia Bullmore; Nicholas Gleaves; Danny Miller; Pippa Haywood
- Country of origin: United Kingdom
- Original language: English
- No. of series: 5
- No. of episodes: 33 (list of episodes)

Production
- Executive producers: Nicola Shindler; Sally Wainwright; Tom Sherry; Suranne Jones
- Producers: Yvonne Francas; Juliet Charlesworth
- Production locations: Greater Manchester, England, United Kingdom
- Editor: 3SixtyMedia
- Camera setup: 3SixtyMedia
- Running time: 45 minutes
- Production company: Red Production Company

Original release
- Network: ITV
- Release: 29 May 2011 – 27 April 2016

Scott & Bailey is a British police procedural series that debuted on ITV on 29 May 2011 and concluded on 27 April 2016. The series stars Suranne Jones, Lesley Sharp, Amelia Bullmore, Nicholas Gleaves, Danny Miller and Pippa Haywood. The show, mainly written by Sally Wainwright, revolves around the personal and professional lives of detectives Janet Scott (played by Sharp) and Rachel Bailey (played by Jones). Both characters are members of the Syndicate Nine Major Incident Team (MIT) of the fictional Manchester Metropolitan Police.

Despite continued good reception and strong viewership, the series was cancelled after an abbreviated fifth series in 2016 for creative reasons. In March 2018, Canadian TV remade the series as The Detail but the show was cancelled after one season.

== Episodes ==
| Series | Episodes | Originally released | | Average viewers (millions) |
| Series | Episodes | First released | Last released | Average viewers (millions) |
|---|---|---|---|---|
| 1 | 6 | 29 May 2011 | 3 July 2011 | 7.74 (Note: Based from the consolidated ratings from the first series for ITV, including the ITV HD simulcast and ITV+1) |
| 2 | 8 | 12 March 2012 | 30 April 2012 | 6.94 (Note: Based from the consolidated ratings from the second series for ITV, including the ITV HD simulcast and ITV+1) |
| 3 | 8 | 3 April 2013 | 23 May 2013 | 6.86 (Note: Based from the consolidated ratings from the third series for ITV, including the ITV HD simulcast and ITV+1) |
| 4 | 8 | 10 September 2014 | 29 October 2014 | 5.73 (Note: Based from the consolidated ratings from the fourth series for ITV, including the ITV HD simulcast (for Ep 5–8) and ITV+1) |
| 5 | 3 | 13 April 2016 | 27 April 2016 | 6.09 (Note: Based from the consolidated ratings from the fifth series for ITV, including the ITV HD simulcast (for Ep 3) and ITV+1) |

== Cast and characters ==
=== Starring ===
- Lesley Sharp as Detective Constable Janet Scott, a Detective Constable within Syndicate 9 who also briefly acts as Detective Sergeant during Series 3.
- Suranne Jones as Acting Detective Inspector Rachel Bailey, an officer within Syndicate 9 who serves as a Detective Constable from Series 1 to Series 3 before being promoted to Detective Sergeant and Deputy Senior Investigating Officer of Syndicate 9 in Series 4. She is later promoted to Acting Detective Inspector in Series 5 and concurrently serves as the Senior Investigating Officer of Syndicate 9.
- Amelia Bullmore as Detective Chief Inspector Gill Murray (Series 1–4), the Senior Investigating Officer of Syndicate 9.
- Nicholas Gleaves as Detective Sergeant Andy Roper (Series 1–2), a Detective Sergeant and the Deputy Senior Investigating Officer of Syndicate 9.
- Danny Miller as Detective Sergeant Rob Waddington (Series 3–4), a Detective Sergeant and the Deputy Senior Investigating Officer of Syndicate 9.
- Pippa Haywood as Detective Superintendent Julie Dodson (Series 5; supporting, Series 2–4), an officer who serves as a Detective Chief Inspector and Senior Investigating Officer of Syndicate 3 in Series 2. She is later promoted to Detective Superintendent by Series 3 and gains oversight of multiple syndicates, including Syndicate 9, within the Murder Investigation Department.

=== Also starring ===
- David Prosho as Detective Constable Ian "Mitch" Mitchell, a Detective Constable within Syndicate 9.
- Delroy Brown as Detective Constable Lee Broadhurst, a Detective Constable within Syndicate 9.
- Tony Mooney as Detective Constable Pete Readyough, a Detective Constable within Syndicate 9.
- Ben Batt as Detective Constable Kevin Lumb (Series 1–3), a Detective Constable within Syndicate 9.
- Rupert Graves as Nick Savage (Series 1), a CPS barrister.
- Sean Maguire as Police Constable Sean McCartney (Series 2–3), a Police Constable within Manchester Metropolitan Police and later boyfriend/husband of Rachel Bailey.
- Steve Toussaint as Detective Superintendent Will Pemberton (Series 4), a Detective Superintendent within the Vice Unit and boyfriend of Rachel Bailey.
- Danny Webb as Detective Constable Chris Crowley (Series 4), a Detective Constable within Syndicate 9 and later boyfriend of Janet Scott.
- Jing Lusi as Detective Constable Anna Ram (Series 5), a Detective Constable within Syndicate 9.

=== Recurring ===
- Sally Lindsay as Alison Bailey, the daughter of Sharon Bailey and sister of Rachel and Dominic Bailey.
- Harriet Waters as Taisie Scott, the daughter of Adrian and Janet Scott.
- Tony Pitts as Adrian Scott (Series 1–3), the husband of Janet Scott and father of Taisie and Elise Scott.
- Vincent Regan as Detective Chief Superintendent Dave Murray (Series 1–2), the Head of the Review Unit whose team are occasionally called in to review the progress of Syndicate 9 in murder enquiries. He is also the ex-husband of Gill Murray.
- Kevin Doyle as Geoff Hastings (Series 1–2), an old school friend of Janet Scott who brings a cold case to her attention.
- Julia Deakin (Series 2) and Judy Holt (Series 3–5) as "Scary" Mary Jackson, a Home Office pathologist.
- Judith Barker as Dorothy Parsons (Series 2–5), the mother of Janet Scott.
- Shannon Flynn (Series 1) and Olivia Fenton (Series 2–4) as Elise Scott, the daughter of Adrian and Janet Scott.
- Liam Boyle as Dominic Bailey (Series 2), the son of Sharon Bailey and brother of Rachel and Alison Bailey.
- Tracie Bennett as Sharon Bailey (Series 3-4), the mother of Rachel, Alison and Dominic Bailey.
- Nicola Walker as Helen Bartlett (Series 3), a person of interest in an investigation surrounding her parents, Joe and Eunice Bevan.
- George Costigan as Joe Bevan (Series 3), a person of interest to Syndicate 9 following the death of his wife Eunice Bevan.
- Gabrielle Reidy as Assistant Chief Constable Karen Zelinski (Series 3), a senior ranking officer within the Manchester Metropolitan Police.
- Ellie Haddington as Evie Pritchard (Series 4), a person of interest to Syndicate 9 following the death of a missing man near her farm.
- Gregg Chillin as Detective Sergeant Neil Simpson (Series 5), an officer within the Serious Crime Unit.

== Production ==
Scott & Bailey was commissioned after the concept was introduced to executive producer Nicola Shindler, who brought it to writer Sally Wainwright. The series is produced by Manchester-based Red Production Company and is largely filmed in the Greater Manchester area.

=== Concept ===
Scott & Bailey is based on an original idea by Suranne Jones and Sally Lindsay, with Jones commenting that there needed to be more roles for women "that weren't wife-of, sidekick-to, mother-of, mistress-to, etc." Jones remarked, "We were just chatting away over a bottle of wine in a pub" when the idea came to fruition. Lindsay, a fan of television programmes such as Cagney & Lacey, was interested in the concept of a programme detailing the lives of two professional women. Jones later spoke of the programme, saying it is "the Cagney & Lacey of Manchester", though she acknowledged that Scott & Bailey as a drama was more "gritty" and "real".

Upon taking the idea to Nicola Shindler of Red Productions, Shindler contacted Sally Wainwright, who wrote a script for an episode and, according to Jones, they "loved it". Despite the positive reaction, the project "kind of got a bit lost" until ITV discovered it and requested that Wainwright rewrite the script.

Subsequently, Wainwright paired up with Diane Taylor, a former Detective Inspector from Greater Manchester Police, to create the programme, and the production expanded from Jones and Lindsay's original concept. From Taylor's perspective, police procedurals were often filled with not only technical inaccuracies, but what she felt were inaccuracies of how officers behaved, saying: "that's what really irritates me in other dramas – detectives crying over dead bodies and getting drunk senseless. You'd last about two weeks". She said, of her time as a police officer in comparison to portrayals on television, that "reality is much more interesting. I could pull a thousand cases out of my head people would say would never happen. People need drama because they would not believe the reality".

=== Production team ===
Scott & Bailey is produced by Manchester-based Red Production Company, which itself is majority owned by StudioCanal following an acquisition estimated at £30 million in December 2013. Nicola Shindler, who founded the company in 1998, is the programme's executive producer alongside writer Sally Wainwright and Tom Sherry. When speaking of Shindler, Wainwright said: "Nicola is just a genius. She makes you raise your game. So if you're good, she'll make you better".

The role of producer was undertaken by Yvonne Francas for Series 1, and from Series 2 to Series 3, Tom Sherry. Sherry, who has worked for Red Productions for over 15 years, described his job as "the opportunity to meddle in all departments – it's about being able to have a passable stab at everyone's job and to be able to empathise with what they're trying to achieve". For the production of Series 4, Sherry undertook the role of executive producer alongside Wainwright and Shindler, while the position of producer is staffed by Juliet Charlesworth. For the fifth series, filmed in 2015, Suranne Jones became an executive producer alongside Shindler.

The involvement of Diane Taylor as a consultant producer is credited with maintaining Scott & Bailey's "rigorous authenticity". According to Jessamy Calkin of The Telegraph, "the attention to detail is more extreme on this series, say many of the crew, than others they have worked on". During the filming of Unforgiven in 2008 (written by Wainwright and also starring Suranne Jones), Wainwright was told to meet Taylor by Grant Montgomery, the show's designer. After meeting, the production was given the green light by ITV and the script was largely re-written, with Wainwright commenting: "I wasn't writing a single line of dialogue that Diane hadn't influenced". Wainwright is responsible for writing the majority of episodes.

Amelia Bullmore, who plays Gill Murray, wrote three episodes; Wainwright had wanted to get other writers involved in the process. For her first episode as writer, "Bullmore was given a brief – that everything must be from Scott and Bailey's point of view – and she was given a murder". Though she had been a professional writer for almost two decades, Scott and Bailey marked the first instance of Bullmore writing and starring in the same production. Due to Wainwright's increased workload on her other drama series Last Tango in Halifax and Happy Valley, Bullmore was chosen to be the head writer for Scott and Bailey's fourth series in 2014. She was joined on the writing team by Lee Warburton, who wrote two episodes of the fourth series. and returned to write Scott & Bailey's fifth series in 2015.

The directing of Scott & Bailey is undertaken in a method whereby "each director directs a 'block' of two or three episodes, dictated by the schedule – when each episode has finished shooting, the director goes into the edit and a new director takes over for the next block", according to Calkin. The most prolific director of Scott & Bailey is Morag Fullerton, who directed seven episodes.

=== Casting ===
Jones, who had always envisaged herself playing Rachel Bailey when the idea of the project came in to mind, was given the role, though at the programme's pre-production stages the character had a different first name, Cathy. It was originally intended that Lindsay would star with Jones in Scott & Bailey, but she became pregnant with twins, so the role of Janet was given to Lesley Sharp instead; Lindsay received the smaller role of Rachel's sister, Alison. Lindsay approved of Sharp playing the role; Jones also felt pleased at the prospect of working with Sharp, saying "I was really excited on the day of the read-through". Regarding the casting of her husband Nicholas Gleaves as Scott's lover DS Andy Roper, Sharp stated that it was not a contributing factor in his casting, stating: "Nick's an actor and I'm an actress — we don't have the same agent. There's a script with a role in it that was right for him and it so happened that there was a role that was right for me and we both got cast, but it wasn't a conversation that we had that it would be a good idea if we did a television series together because that's not the way life works".

Both Rachel and Janet are Detective Constables in the Major Incident Team of the fictional Manchester Metropolitan Police Service, with the team headed by DCI Gill Murray (Amelia Bullmore), who is loosely based on Diane Taylor. Producers were undecided on what age DCI Murray would be, but had originally pictured an actress older than Bullmore. After auditioning, Bullmore returned a month later, intent on playing Murray "tough", however, when meeting casting director Beverley Keogh in the toilets beforehand, Bullmore recounted that Keogh said to her: "That's not what we've got you back for. We were interested in seeing a warmer side".

Danny Miller joined the cast as series regular Rob Waddington in series 3 and Tracie Bennett also appeared in the third series as DC Bailey's estranged mother, Sharon. In a continuing story arc for the third series, Nicola Walker was cast in the role of Helen Bartlett, a character driven to emotional instability by past events unearthed by the Manchester Metropolitan Police. In preparation for the role Walker visited a psychologist in order to build upon her characterisation.

=== Filming ===
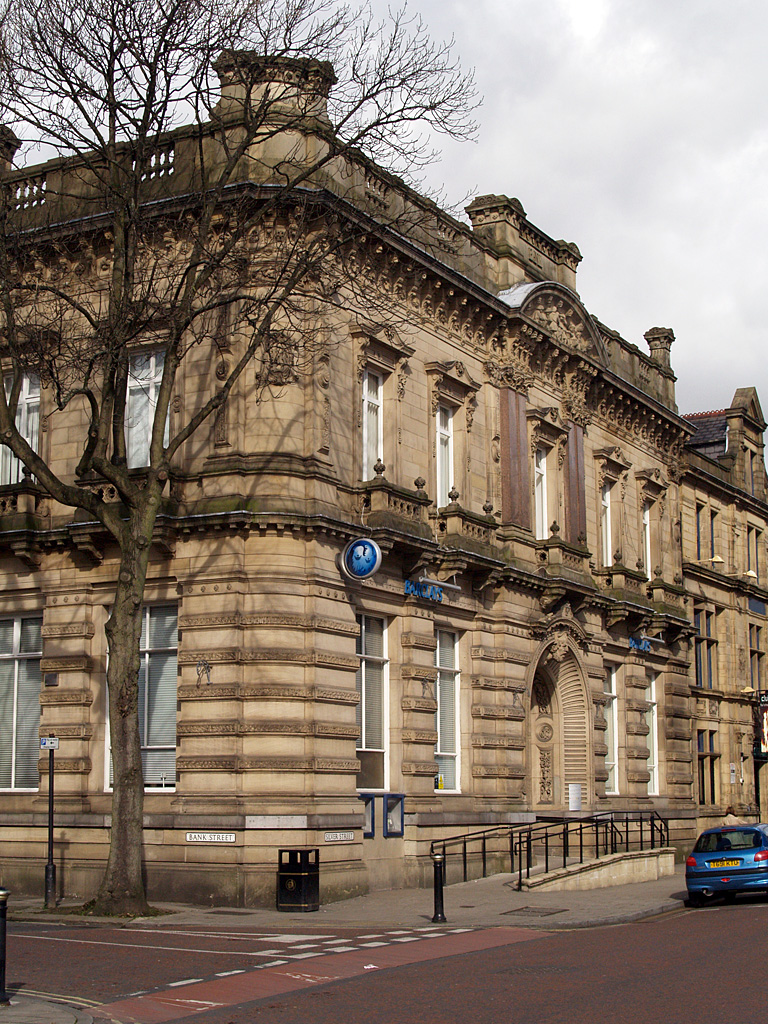
A former Barclays branch in Bury served as the police station exterior in the first three series

Principal photography for the first series took place in a twelve-week window from November 2010 onwards, it was reported by Female First. The series was filmed on location in and around Greater Manchester. Jones mentioned that "On the first day of filming [she and Sharp] were stuck in a car on the moors". Oldham was another location chosen for filming, with local press reporting that Beal Lane in Shaw was used for filming. The Oldham Evening Chronicle supplied specially mocked-up newspapers to be used as props in filming. Other locations such as Manchester Crown Court were used for filming. The Major Incident Team's headquarters for the first three series were filmed in an old Barclays branch on Silver Street, Bury. The filming location used the team's new station, the fictional Oldham Road police station, took place at former Greater Manchester Police Grey Mare Lane police station in Beswick. A local mortuary was also used for filming scenes. The programme was also granted permission to film in HM Prison Risley in Cheshire, where locations manager James Muirhead and a crew of 35 filmed for a day.

When discussing the filming of Scott & Bailey, Jones said "I can't pretend it wasn't a tough shoot, both emotionally and physically, because it was", before adding that on the last day of filming she had to shoot a gruelling scene involving her chasing a suspect from a crime scene, while Sharp and Bullmore "were having massages and facials ready for the wrap party".

When Scott & Bailey was recommissioned for a second series it was announced that production on the series would commence at the end of October 2011, to be aired in 2012. In November it was reported that while filming on Hamilton Road, Whitefield—the set of DC Scott's home—that an emergency call was made after a member of the television crew, a lighting technician, became stranded on top of a "cherry-picker style platform" 12 metres (39 ft) above the ground. Fearing the mechanism could fail and cause the crew member to fall to the ground, they sought assistance from firefighters, who safely brought the technician to the ground.

Filming for series 3 began in November 2012, with an airing date scheduled for May 2013. As the fourth series had a different air date (its television broadcast began in September, unlike May for the three previous series) it became the first series not to be filmed in the winter months. A longer break in production between series 3 and 4 was the reason that the fourth series was instead filmed in summer.

== Home media ==
| Series | Episodes | DVD release dates | | | |
| Series | Episodes | Region 2 (United Kingdom) | Region 1 (United States) | Region 4 (Australia) | Discs |
|---|---|---|---|---|---|
| 1 | 6 | 4 July 2011 | 17 June 2014 | 3 November 2011 | 2 |
| 2 | 8 | 4 June 2012 | 16 September 2014 | 7 November 2012 | 2 |
| 3 | 8 | 1 July 2013 | 5 May 2015 | 4 December 2013 | 2 |
| 4 | 8 | 10 November 2014 | 15 March 2016 | 25 February 2015 | 2 |
| 5 | 3 | 2 May 2016 | 11 October 2016 | 14 September 2016 | 1 |

=== Region 1 (U.S. and Canada) ===
Scott & Bailey: Season 1, 279 (270 + 9 bonus) minutes; 17 June 2014
Scott & Bailey: Season 2, 370 (359 + 11bonus) minutes; 16 September 2014
Scott & Bailey: Season 3, 382 (364 + 15 bonus) minutes; 6 October 2015
Scott & Bailey: Season 4, 359 (363 + 17 bonus) minutes; 15 March 2016
Scott & Bailey: Season 5, 130/135 (135 + 0 bonus) minutes; 11 October 2016

== Reception ==
=== Critical reception ===
This series promises so much more than the usual oft-time lazy ITV Sunday cop drama.

— Euan Ferguson, The Observer

Scott & Bailey has received generally good reviews. Tom Sutcliffe of The Independent remarked that although it was a "less-than-courageous decision" for ITV to commission a detective drama for Sunday nights, Scott & Bailey had "genuine signs of life in the thing". Sam Wollaston of The Guardian, however, questioned the plausibility of the idea that the character of Rachel would not realise her partner of two years was already married, considering she was a detective, and described the series as "Lewis with skirts on". However, Grace Dent, also of The Guardian, described it as "of great televisual comfort". Alexandra Heminsley, another writer for The Guardian, described it as "a genuinely gripping crime series" and added: "what about a second series?" Euan Ferguson of The Observer stated that it was "actually rather gripping". Horatia Harrod, reviewing the third series for The Daily Telegraph, praised the programme's script and its likeness to reality in portraying the professional conduct of modern policing, stating: "this is a beautifully engineered programme: it's both pleasingly sudsy and deliciously grisly, but manages to transcend both the soap and detective genres [...] Somehow Sally Wainwright, the show's creator and writer, has made the traditionally dull quality of professional competence seem positively thrilling".

John Preston of The Daily Telegraph gave a mixed review: though he commended the acting of Sharp and Jones, he stated that "it badly needs some shape and tension". The Metro took a decidedly critical stance, with its reviews getting progressively worse with each new episode; first describing it as "comforting but could have been so much better", then later quipping that "Scott & Bailey will never be compelling TV", and that the programme was "a mediocre crime drama amidst a saturated market of mediocre crime dramas".

One of the more persistent criticisms of the show (especially its first two series) has been its indifferent or decidedly negative depiction of male characters. Dianne Butler, who reviewed the programme upon its airing in Australia, made a similar point, questioning the relevance of the show's male characters: "there are some men in this but they're fairly incidental". The Guardian's John Crace expressed his belief that most of the programme's male characters are deficient in some way, writing: "surely it must be possible to make a show with women lead characters without having to make every male a complete dork? From Janet's useless husband and Rachel's idiot brother who can't boil an egg without burning down the kitchen".

The performances of Amelia Bullmore and Nicola Walker in the Series 3 finale were highly praised. Julia Raeside of The Guardian commented that both "give an incredible acting masterclass that will take your breath away. Truly gripping and the jewel in ITV's increasingly impressive drama crown. Splendid stuff." The series was nominated for the BAFTA TV award for Best Drama Series in both 2012 and 2013.

=== Television ratings ===
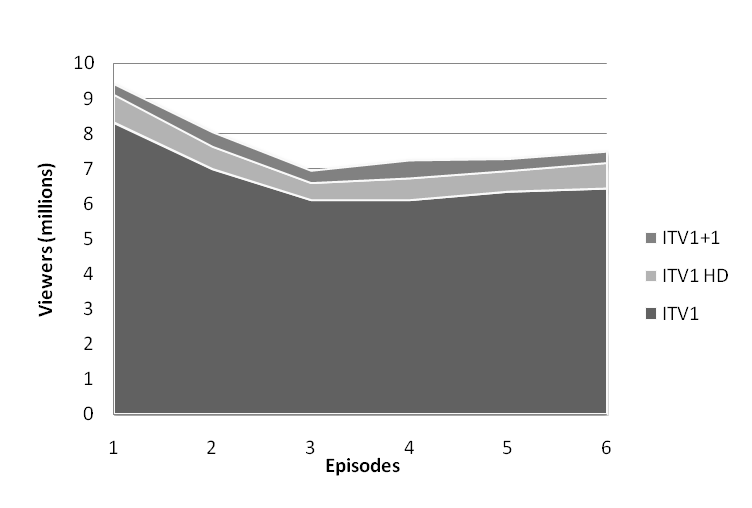
A breakdown of the ratings the show received from its three airing channels, ITV, ITV HD, and ITV+1, for Series 1

Since Scott & Bailey's debut it has fared well in the ratings. The programme's closest rival was a broadcast of the film Pirates of the Caribbean: Dead Man's Chest, which received 20.9% of the audience share. Scott and Bailey aired as the follow-on programme from Britain's Got Talent, which had received 9.86 million viewers and a 40.4% audience share in its timeslot.

The Broadcasters' Audience Research Board (BARB) later released consolidated information stating that the first episode had received 8.31 million viewers on ITV, with a further 801,000 tuning in on ITV HD, and 310,000 on ITV1+1, totalling the viewing figures to 9.42 for the first episode. The episode was 2011's fourth highest-rating drama broadcast, as well as the highest-rating broadcast for a new drama. By episode two it was reported that Scott & Bailey had dropped nearly 1.8 million viewers from episode one, with overnight figures suggesting 6.14 million (23.6%) tuned in, though it was still the number-one-rated programme in its timeslot. The programme continued to outperform its competitors in its timeslot until the end of its first series, beating competition including BBC One dramas Case Histories and Stolen.

== Novel ==
Random House published a novel based on the characters of Scott & Bailey in 2012.

== See also ==
- Cagney & Lacey, an American TV series with a similar premise
- Rizzoli & Isles
