= Lee Warburton =

British actor (born 1971)

Lee Warburton (born 27 June 1971, Cheshire, England) is a British actor, known for several ongoing television roles.

He appeared in Coronation Street from 1995 to 1998 as Tony Horrocks, Natalie Barnes' drug addict son; played gay healthcare assistant Tony Vincent in Casualty and its spin-off Holby City from 2001 to 2003; and played Melanie Costello's violent boyfriend Graham Harker in Family Affairs in 2004–2005.

Warburton's most recent television role was in Hollyoaks: In the City in 2006.

He is also a scriptwriter credited with several episodes of Scott & Bailey.
