= Lucy Gannon =

British playwright, television writer and producer

Lucy Gannon MBE
- Born: 1948 (age 77–78); UK
- Occupations: Playwright, television writer, and producer
- Writing career
- Period: 1987–
- Genre: Drama
- Notable awards: The Eileen Anderson Award, the Richard Burton Drama Award, the 1989–90 Susan Smith Blackburn Prize, the BAFTA Cymru

Lucy Gannon (born 1948) is a British playwright, television writer and producer. She is best known for creating series such as Soldier Soldier, Bramwell and Peak Practice.

== Early life ==
Gannon was born to a military father. Gannon once worked as a military policewoman, a residential social worker and a nurse, and lived in a concrete council house with no central heating. Her late husband George worked as an engineer. She later moved to a converted barn in Derbyshire, and now lives near Cardigan, Wales.

== Career ==
Gannon's career started, in 1987, when she entered the Richard Burton Award for New Playwrights. Her play, Keeping Tom Nice, about a disabled boy whose father commits suicide, earned her the award and a six-month writer-in-residence post at the Royal Shakespeare Company. In 1988, Keeping Tom Nice was shown at the Almeida Theatre in London, and, in 1989, it was shown as a BBC TV Screenplay starring Linus Roache.

As well as creating longer series, including Peak Practice, Gannon has written several single or short run dramas for television, including Dad, Tender Loving Care, Trip Trap, The Gift, Big Cat, Pure Wickedness and The Children. In 2012, Gannon wrote the one-off BBC Two drama The Best of Men, which told the story of the first Paralympic Games, and starred Eddie Marsan and Rob Brydon. She was the lead writer and creator of the 2013 BBC One drama series Frankie.

In 2008 Gannon, criticised the BBC, saying that delays in commissioning programmes threaten writers and producers.

In 2020, Gannon published her memoir, The Amazingly Astonishing Story. It was shortlisted for Wales Book of the Year 2021. In 2022, Gannon published a writing guide, Do Drama: How to stop watching TV drama. And start writing it.

== Awards ==
In 1996, Gannon was appointed an MBE for services to Drama. Among her other recognitions are the Eileen Anderson Award, the Richard Burton Drama Award, the 1989–90 Susan Smith Blackburn Prize, the BAFTA Cymru, the Contribution to the Media Award (Women in Film and Television) and, most recently, the RTS Award (South West England) for Best Writer for The Best of Men.

== Works ==
=== Plays ===
- Broken Hearted, 2010
- Keeping Tom Nice. Josef Weinberger Plays. 15 June 1990. ISBN 978-0-85676-146-1.
- Tender Loving Care
- Dancing Attendance, 1990
- A Dog Barking, 1988
- Janet And John, 1988
- Raping The Gold, 1988
- Wicked Old Nellie, 1987

=== Television ===
- Frankie (2013), creator & writer
- The Best of Men (2012), TV film
- The Children (2008), TV mini-series, writer
- Wild at Heart (1 episode, 2007), writer
- Dad (2005), TV series, writer
- Blue Dove (2003), TV mini-series, creator & writer
- Servants (2003), TV series, writer
- Plain Jane (2002), writer
- Hope and Glory (1999–2000), TV series, creator & writer
- Pure Wickedness (1999), writer
- Big Cat (1998), writer
- The Gift (1998), writer
- Bramwell (17 episodes, 1995–1998), creator
- Trip Trap (1996), writer
- Peak Practice (15 episodes, 1993–1994), creator
- Screen One (1 episode, 1993)
- Soldier Soldier (11 episodes, 1991-1997), creator & writer
- A Small Dance (1991), writer
- Testimony of a Child (1989)
